= Hadsel =

Hadsel may refer to:

== Places ==
- Hadsel Municipality, a municipality in Nordland county, Norway
- Hadsel (village), a village in Hadsel Municipality in Nordland county, Norway
- Hadsel Bridge, a road bridge in Hadsel Municipality in Nordland county, Norway
- Hadsel Church, a church in Hadsel Municipality in Nordland county, Norway
- Hadsel Island, or Hadseløya, an island in Hadsel Municipality in Nordland county, Norway

== People ==
- Fred L. Hadsel (1916-2010), an American diplomat

== Other ==
- Hadsel (album), the sixth studio album by indie folk band Beirut
