= Brottøya =

Island in Nordland, Norway

Brottøya Brottøy
- Interactive map of Brottøya; Brottøy

Geography
- Location: Nordland, Norway
- Coordinates: 68.4828°N 15.1720°E
- Archipelago: Vesterålen
- Area: 2.8 km^{2} (1.1 sq mi)
- Length: 3 km (1.9 mi)
- Width: 1.5 km (0.93 mi)
- Highest elevation: 64 m (210 ft)
- Highest point: Durmålshaugen

Administration
- Norway
- County: Nordland
- Municipality: Hadsel Municipality

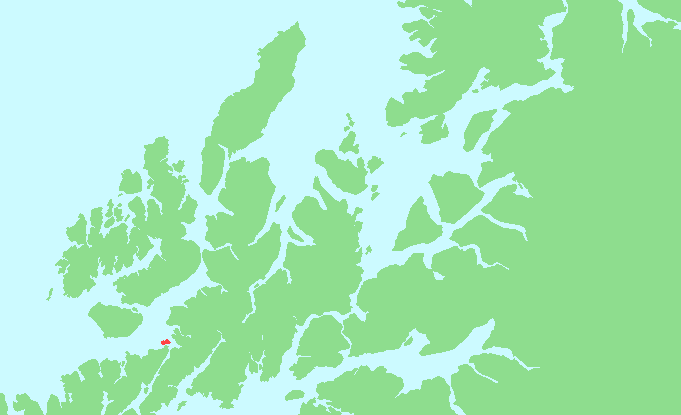
Map of Brottøya within Nordland

Brottøya is an island in Hadsel Municipality in Nordland county, Norway. The island lies in the Hadselfjorden, on the west side of the northern entrance to the Raftsundet strait. Brottøya has an area of approximately 2.8 square kilometres (1.1 sq mi) and the highest point is the 64-metre (210 ft) tall mountain Durmålshaugen.

Brottøya has a ferry connection to the nearby town of Stokmarknes on the island of Hadseløya, to the village of Kaljord on the island of Hinnøya and to the village of Hanøyvika on the island of Austvågøya.

During the planning of Lofoten's mainland connection (Lofast) there was an option to add the road over Brottøya to Helgenes and Lonkan and further toward Hennes, Blokken and Sigerfjorden. The alternative was rejected, and Lofast was instead built to the south of Gullesfjorden and by bridge over Raftsundet.

== See also ==
- List of islands of Norway
