= Møysalen =

Mountain in Nordland, Norway

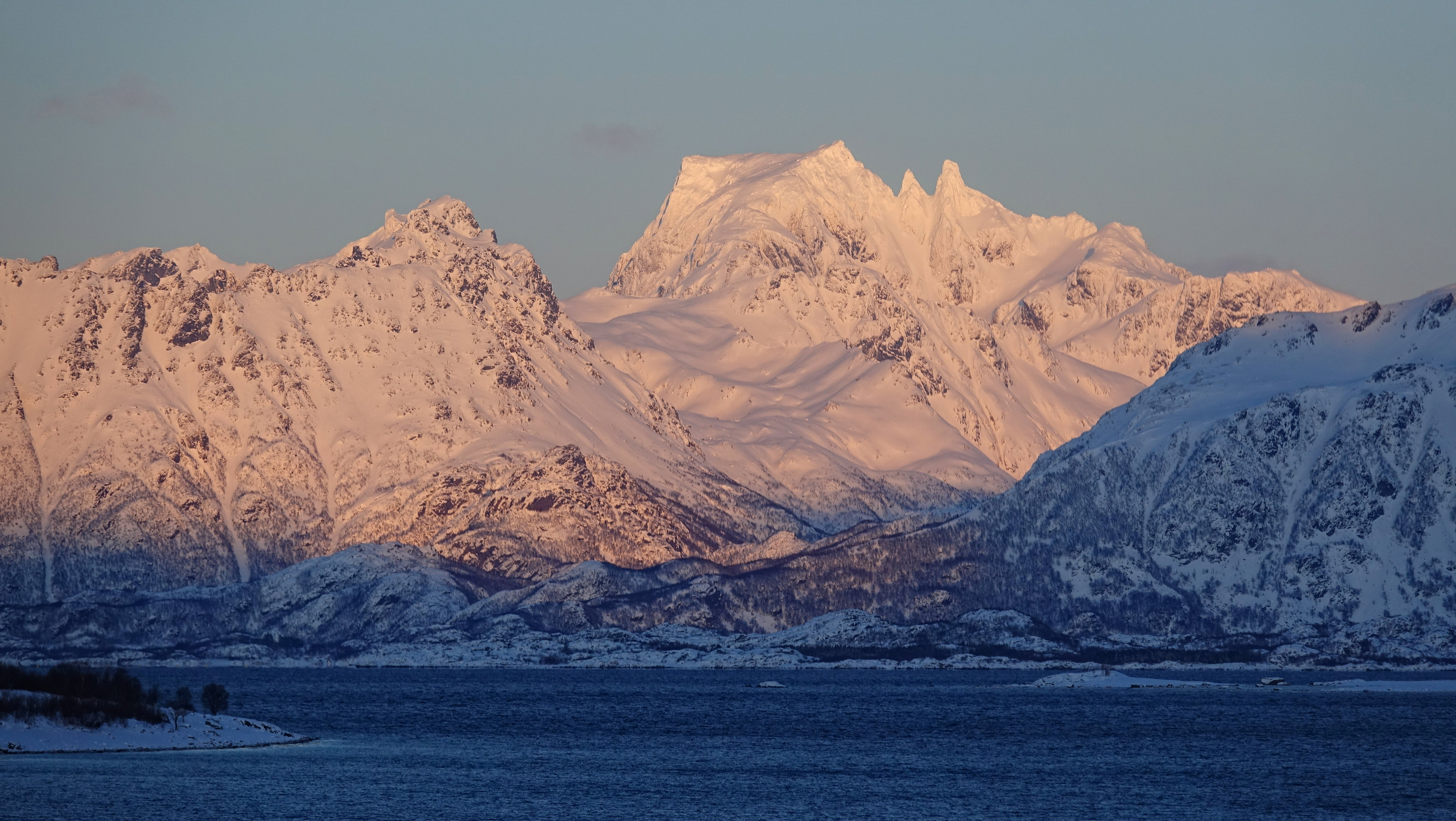
- Møysalen seen from south-west

Highest point
- Elevation: 1,262 m (4,140 ft)
- Prominence: 1,262 m (4,140 ft)
- Isolation: 61.4 to 61.6 km (38.2 to 38.3 mi)
- Listing: #17 in Norway by prominence
- Coordinates: 68.5260°N 15.4521°E

Naming
- English translation: "The Maidens' Hall" or "The Maidens' Saddle"

Geography
- Interactive map of the mountain
- Location: Nordland, Norway
- Topo map(s): 1231 IV Raftsundet and 1232 III Sortland

Møysalen is a mountain in Nordland county, Norway. It is located on the border of Sortland Municipality and Lødingen Municipality. At 1,262 metres (4,140 ft) tall, it is the highest mountain on the island of Hinnøya and the second highest mountain on any island in Norway. The mountain is located within Møysalen National Park, about 10 kilometres (6.2 mi) straight east of the villages of Hennes and Kaldjorda in Hadsel Municipality.

== Name ==
The name derives from the Norwegian words møy, which translates to maiden, and sal, which can be translated into either saddle or hall. South of the peak is two smaller peaks, named Lille Møya (The Small Maiden) and Store Møya (The Big Maiden), which according to local folklore were two troll maidens that were turned into stone. Møysalen is either the saddle or the roof of the hall of these two maidens.

== See also ==
- List of mountains in Norway by prominence
