= Norwegian County Road 82 =

Road in Nordland county, Norway

County Road 82

Major junctions
- North end: Fv86 at Andenes
- South end: E10 at Melbu

Location
- Country: Norway
- Counties: Nordland
- Major cities: Stokmarknes, Sortland, Andenes

Highway system
- Roads in Norway; National Roads; County Roads

County Road 82 (Norwegian: Fylkesvei 82) is a road in Nordland county, Norway. It runs between the village of Fiskebøl (in Hadsel Municipality) and the town of Andenes (in Andøy Municipality). The road runs through the municipalities of Hadsel, Sortland, and Andøy. At Fiskebøl, the road intersects with the European route E10 highway before crossing the Hadselfjorden on the Fiskebøl–Melbu Ferry. Bridges on the road include Andøy Bridge, Sortland Bridge, Hadsel Bridge, and Børøy Bridge. Two sections are designated as part of two National Tourist Routes in Norway: the section from the intersection with E10 to Fiskebøl is part of Lofoten National Tourist Route, and the section through Andenes is part of Andenes National Tourist Route. During summer, the Andenes–Gryllefjord Ferry connects to County Road 86 at Gryllefjord on the island of Senja. Before 1 January 2010, the road was called National Road 82 (Norwegian: Riksvei 82), but due to reforms that went into effect on that day, the county took over the ownership and maintenance of the road.

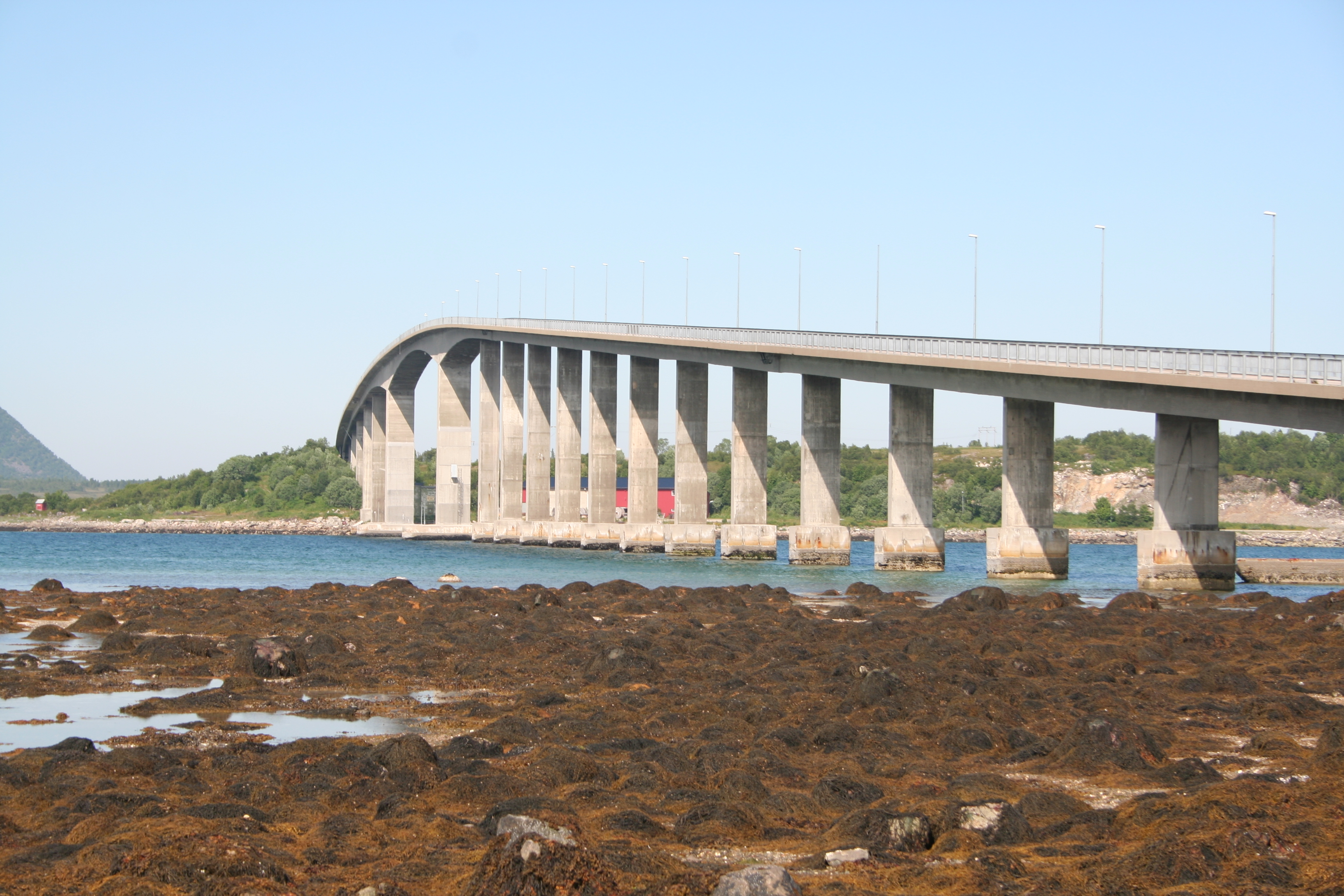
Andøy Bridge

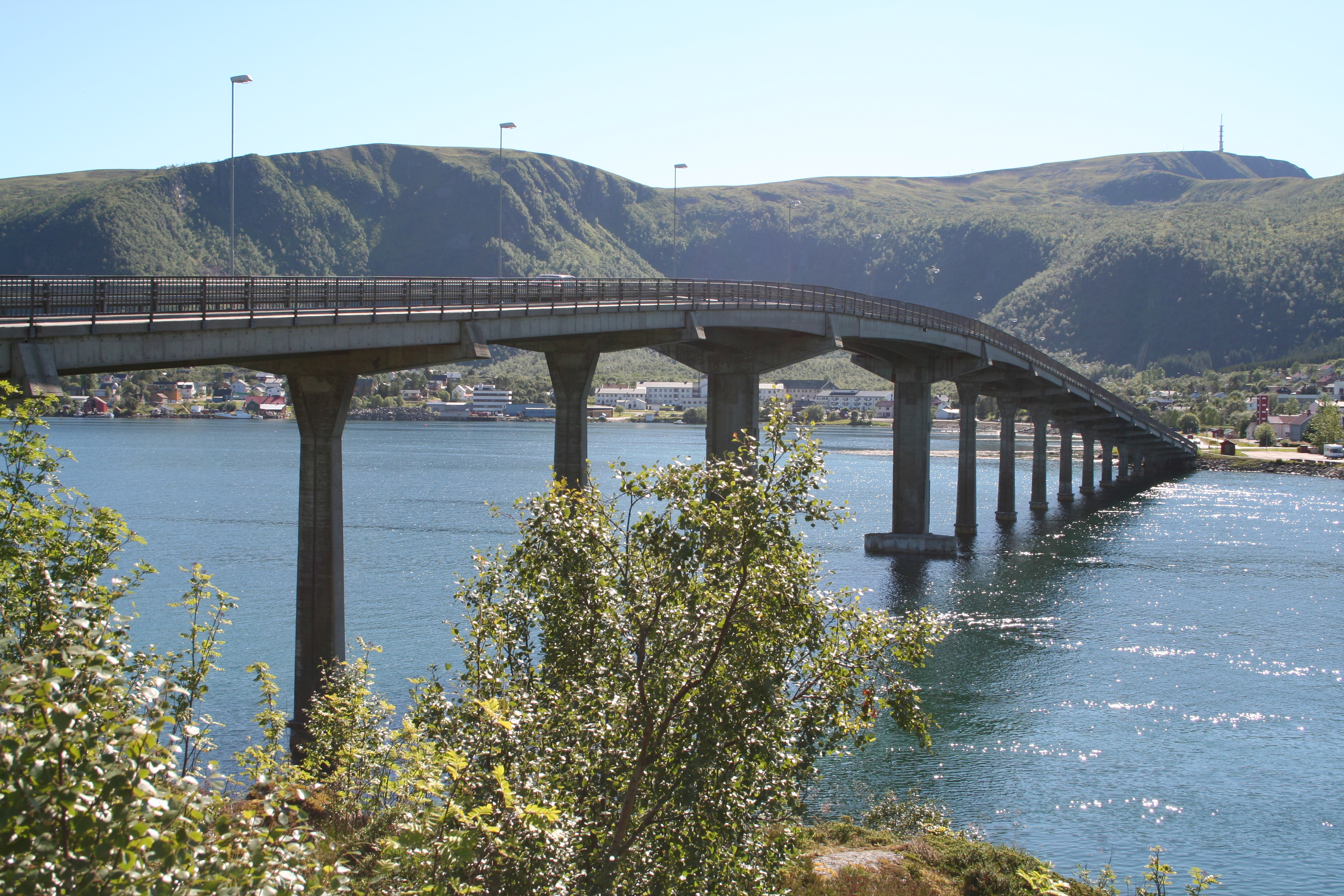
Børøy Bridge

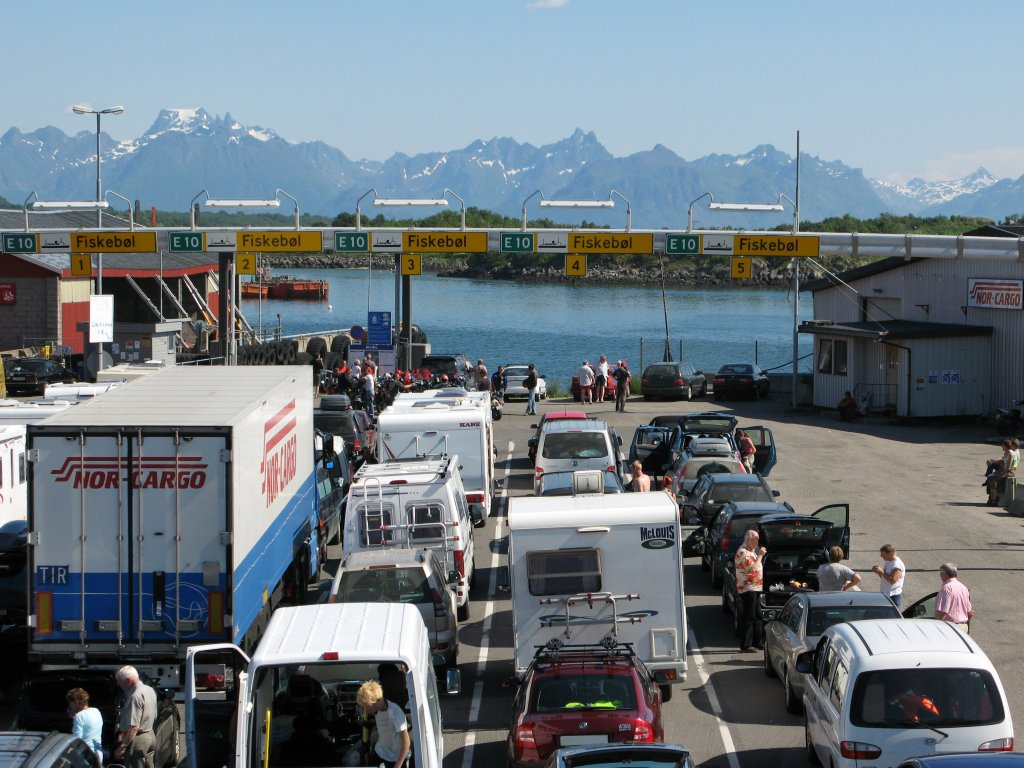
The ferry quay at Melbu
