= Børøy Bridge =

Børøy Bridge Børøybrua
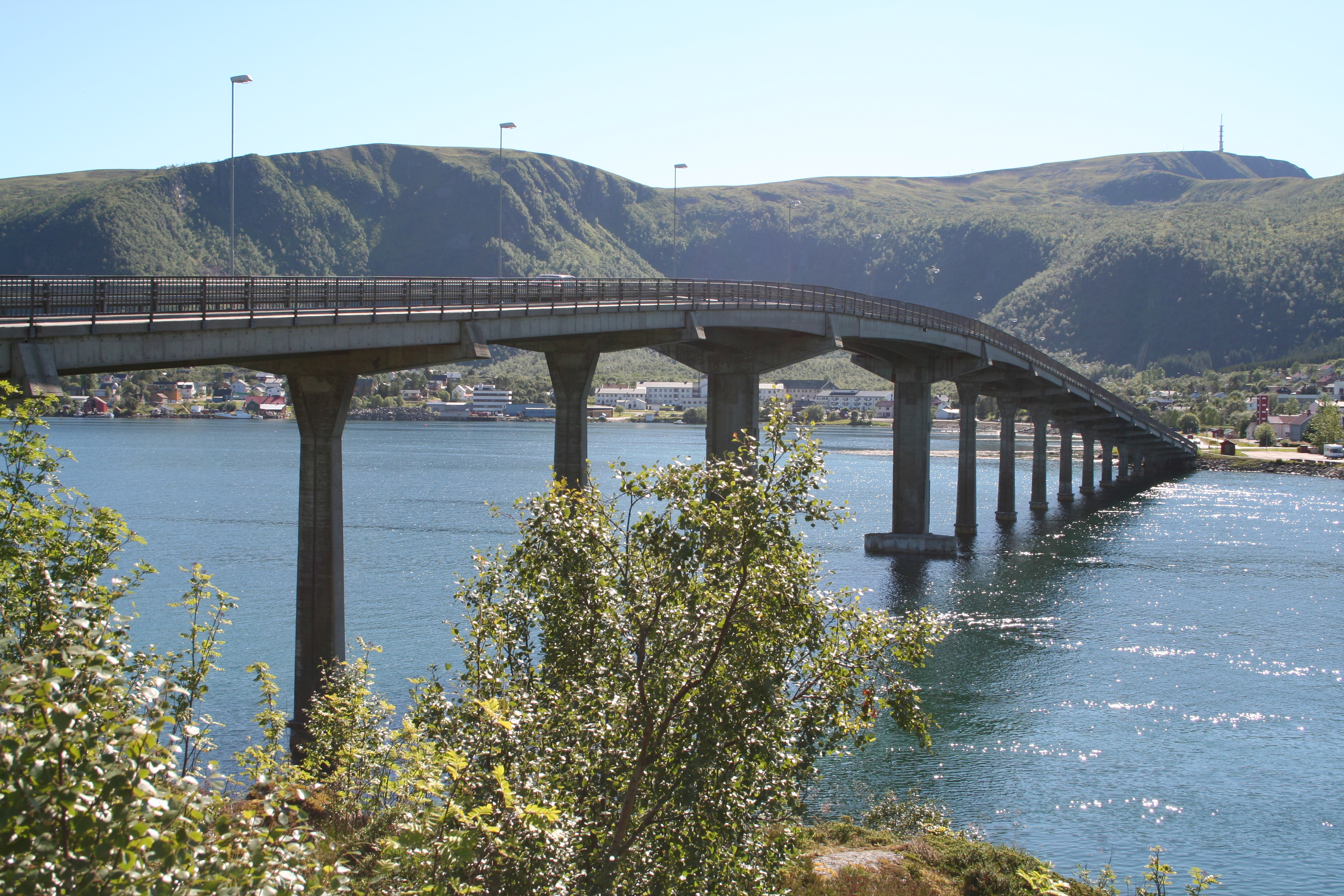
- View of the bridge
- Coordinates: 68°34′02″N 14°55′08″E
- Carries: Fv82
- Crosses: Langøysundet
- Locale: Hadsel, Norway

Characteristics
- Total length: 336 metres (1,102 ft)
- Longest span: 15 metres (49 ft)

History
- Opened: 1967

The Børøy Bridge (Norwegian: Børøybrua) is a bridge in Hadsel Municipality in Nordland county, Norway. The bridge carries Norwegian County Road 82 between the town of Stokmarknes on the island of Hadseløya to the nearby island of Børøya. Together with the Hadsel Bridge it connects the islands of Hadseløya and Langøya. The bridge is 336 metres (1,102 ft) long and its maximum clearing to the sea is 15 metres (49 ft). The Børøy Bridge was built in 1967, and was the first of the main bridges in the Vesterålen islands. The municipality of Hadsel financed the building of the bridge after the municipality bought the island of Børøya in 1963.

== See also ==
- List of bridges in Norway
- List of bridges in Norway by length
- List of bridges
- List of bridges by length
