= Maren-Sofie Røstvig =

Norwegian literary historian (1920–2014)

- Born: 27 March 1920; Melbu, Norway
- Died: 24 January 2014 (aged 93)
- Education: University of California
- Occupation: Literary historian

Maren-Sofie Røstvig (27 March 1920 – 24 January 2014) was a Norwegian literary historian. Her doctoral thesis from 1950 treated English poetry from the 17th century.

== Early life and World War II ==
She was born in Melbu in Hadsel Municipality, a daughter of Olaf Røstvig and Sigrid Elise Larsen. Røstvig was a student during the German occupation of Norway, and took part in the civil resistance. She was arrested in October 1943, and was incarcerated in Bredtveit Prison for about six weeks. From August 1944 to May 1945 she published the illegal weekly newspaper Frihet og fred (34 issues), along with two other women.

== Career ==
Røstvig obtained a doctorate in historical treatise on English poetry in the 17th-century from the University of California. Her treatise was later expanded and published as the first volume of The Happy Man (1954). The second volume, which covers the 1700s, was published in 1958. Røstvig has also conducted research on text structures in Renaissance literature and identifying their literature theoretical background. In her book Configurations (1994), she explored the formal elements of European poetry, with special focus on the works of Edmund Spenser to John Dryden. She was appointed professor of English literature at the University of Oslo from 1968 to 1987. She was a member of the Norwegian Academy of Science and Letters from 1963.

She resided at Huk in Oslo, where she survived an all-consuming fire in 1999. She died in January 2014.
