= Sanden, Nordland =

Village in Hadsel Municipality, Norway

Sanden Hadselsand (historic name)
- Village
- Interactive map of Sanden
- Location within Nordland Location within Norway
- Coordinates: 68.4327°N 14.6211°E
- Country: Norway
- Region: Northern Norway
- County: Nordland
- District: Vesterålen
- Municipality: Hadsel Municipality
- Elevation: 9 m (30 ft)
- Time zone: UTC+01:00 (CET)
  - Summer (DST): UTC+02:00 (CEST)
- Post Code: 8315 Laukvik

Sanden is a village in Hadsel Municipality in Nordland county, Norway. The village is located along the Hadselfjorden on the northern part of the island of Austvågøya, not far from the border with Vågan Municipality and about 10 kilometres (6.2 mi) west of the village of Fiskebøl. Sand Church is located in Sanden.
