= Sand Church (Nordland) =

Church in Nordland, Norway

- Sand kirke
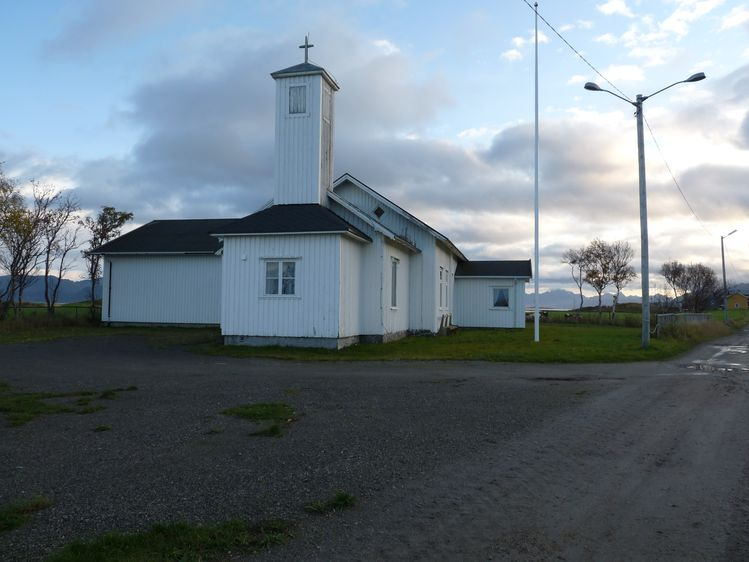
- View of the church
- Sand Church
- 68.4336236°N 14.6138607°E
- Location: Hadsel, Nordland
- Country: Norway
- Denomination: Church of Norway
- Churchmanship: Evangelical Lutheran

History
- Status: Chapel
- Founded: 13th century
- Consecrated: 1914

Architecture
- Functional status: Active
- Architectural type: Long church
- Completed: 1914 (112 years ago)

Specifications
- Capacity: 100
- Materials: Wood

Administration
- Diocese: Sør-Hålogaland
- Deanery: Vesterålen prosti
- Parish: Melbu
- Norwegian Cultural Heritage Site
- Type: Church
- Status: Not protected
- ID: 85372

Sand Church (Norwegian: Sand kirke) is a chapel of the Church of Norway in Hadsel Municipality in Nordland county, Norway. It is located in the village of Sanden on the island of Austvågøya. It is an annex chapel for the Melbu parish which is part of the Vesterålen prosti (deanery) in the Diocese of Sør-Hålogaland. The white, wooden chapel was built in a long church style in 1914 to serve the southern part of Hadsel (on Austvågøya island). The chapel seats about 100 people. The building was also used as a school for many years, but the school closed in 1990.

== History ==
The earliest existing historical records of the church date back to the year 1589, but the church was not new that year. There is some evidence that the church was founded in the 13th century. It was an annex chapel for the main Hadsel Church through the Middle Ages, and the priest would hold services there every third Sunday. The church stood about 100 metres (330 ft) west of the present church site. After centuries standing on that site, the church was closed and torn down in 1810. About 100 years later, in 1914, the parish built a new chapel about 100 metres (330 ft) east of the old church site and cemetery.

== See also ==
- List of churches in Sør-Hålogaland
