= Melbu Church =

Church in Nordland, Norway

- Melbu kirke
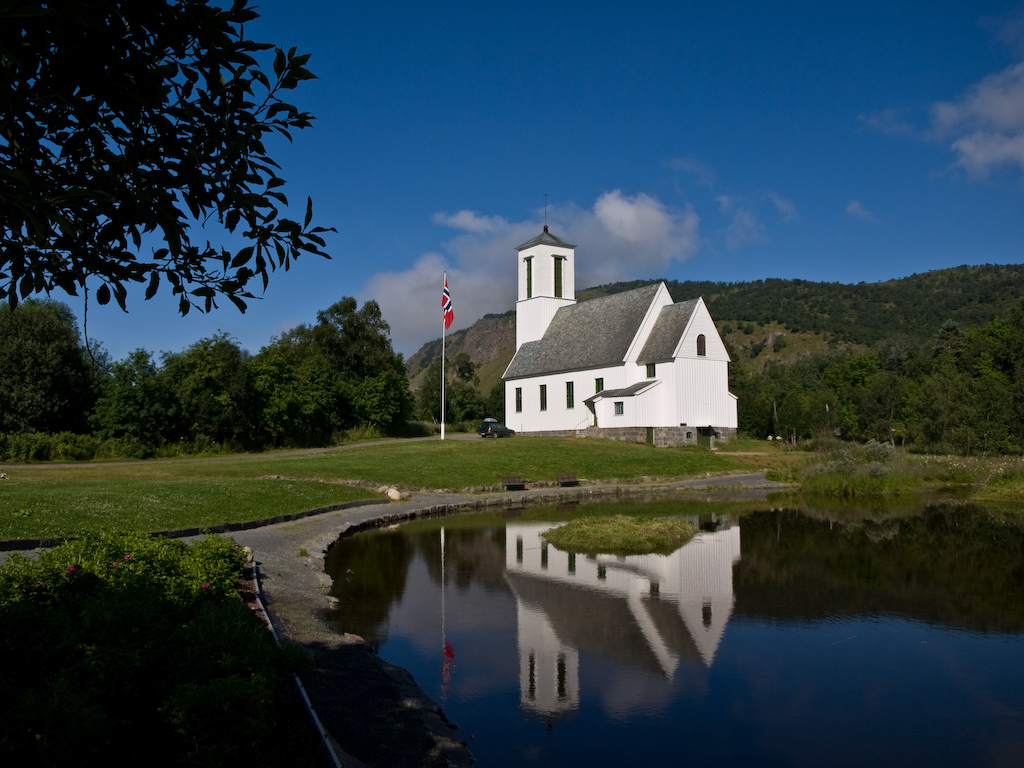
- View of the church
- Melbu Church
- 68.50297125°N 14.79703366°E
- Location: Hadsel, Nordland
- Country: Norway
- Denomination: Church of Norway
- Churchmanship: Evangelical Lutheran

History
- Status: Parish church

Architecture
- Functional status: Active
- Architect: Harald Sund
- Architectural type: Long church
- Completed: 1938 (88 years ago)

Specifications
- Capacity: 250
- Materials: Wood

Administration
- Diocese: Sør-Hålogaland
- Deanery: Vesterålen prosti
- Parish: Melbu
- Norwegian Cultural Heritage Site
- Type: Church
- Status: Automatically protected

Melbu Church (Norwegian: Melbu kirke) is a parish church of the Church of Norway in Hadsel Municipality in Nordland county, Norway. It is located in the village of Melbu on the island of Hadseløya. It is one of the churches for the Melbu parish which is part of the Vesterålen prosti (deanery) in the Diocese of Sør-Hålogaland. The white, wooden church was built in a long church style in 1938 using plans drawn up by the architect Harald Sund. The church seats about 250 people.

== History ==
There was a medieval church in Melbu, but the old stave church became run down and in poor condition, so there were no more worship services held after 1694. The church remained standing until at least 1750, but it was in "fragile" condition by then. The exact location of the old church is unknown. In 1919, Mrs. Maren Fredriksen from the Melbu farm sought to have a church located in the Melbu area to serve the people in that area. She donated land south of the farm in 1932 for the church and a surrounding graveyard with room for about 160 graves. The church was completed in 1938.

== Media gallery ==
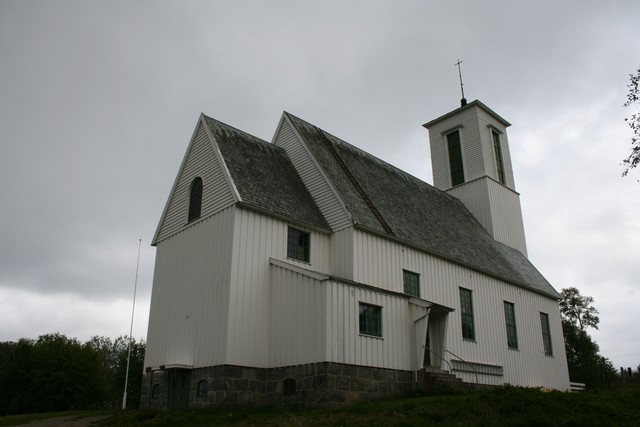

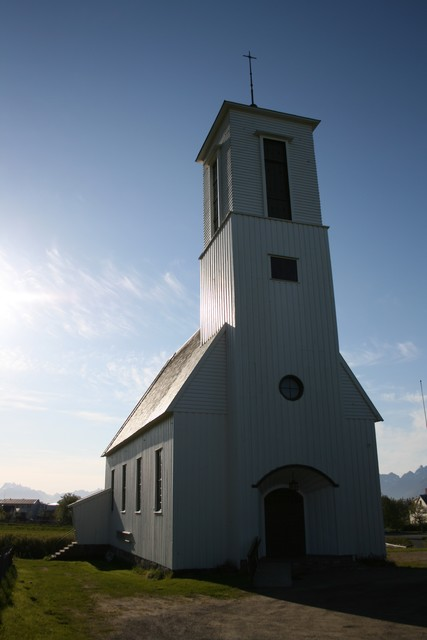

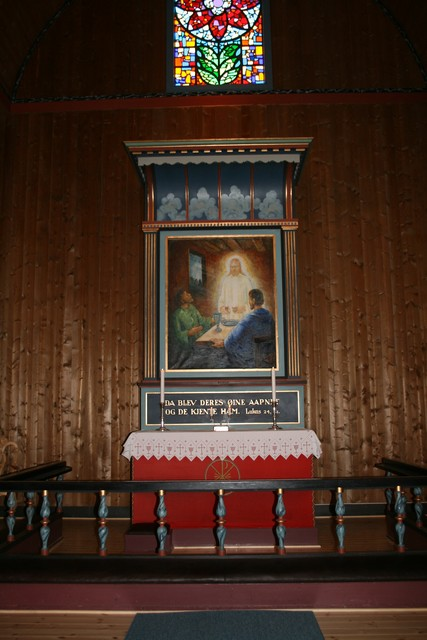

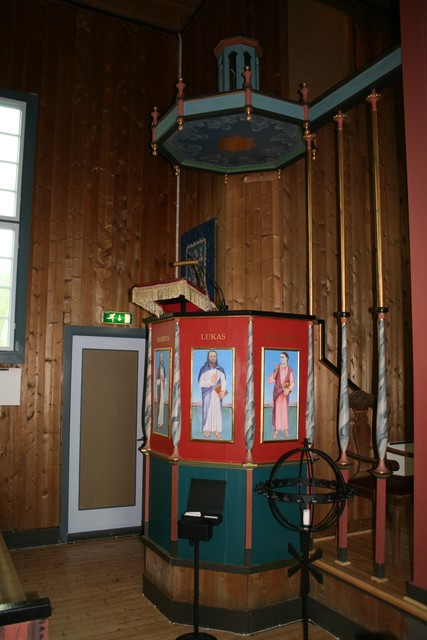

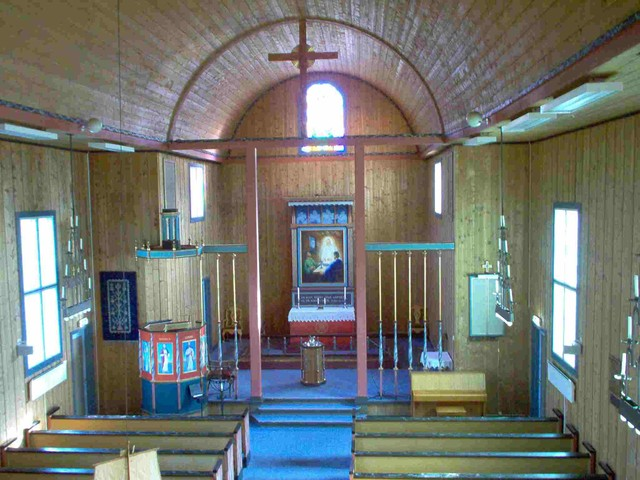

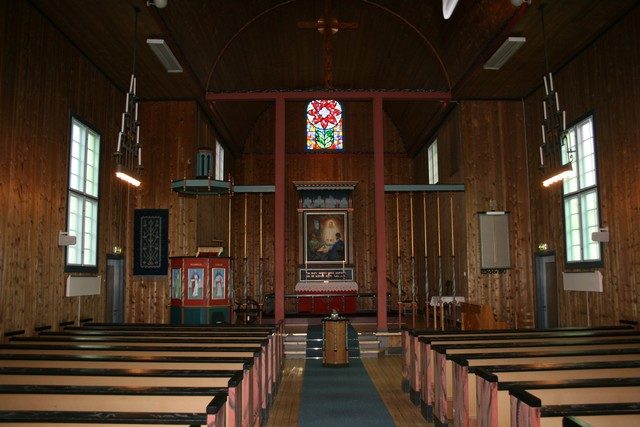

== See also ==
- List of churches in Sør-Hålogaland
