= Grønning =

Village in Hadsel Municipality, Norway

Grønning: Grønning (Norwegian); Gronnegak (Northern Sami)
- Village
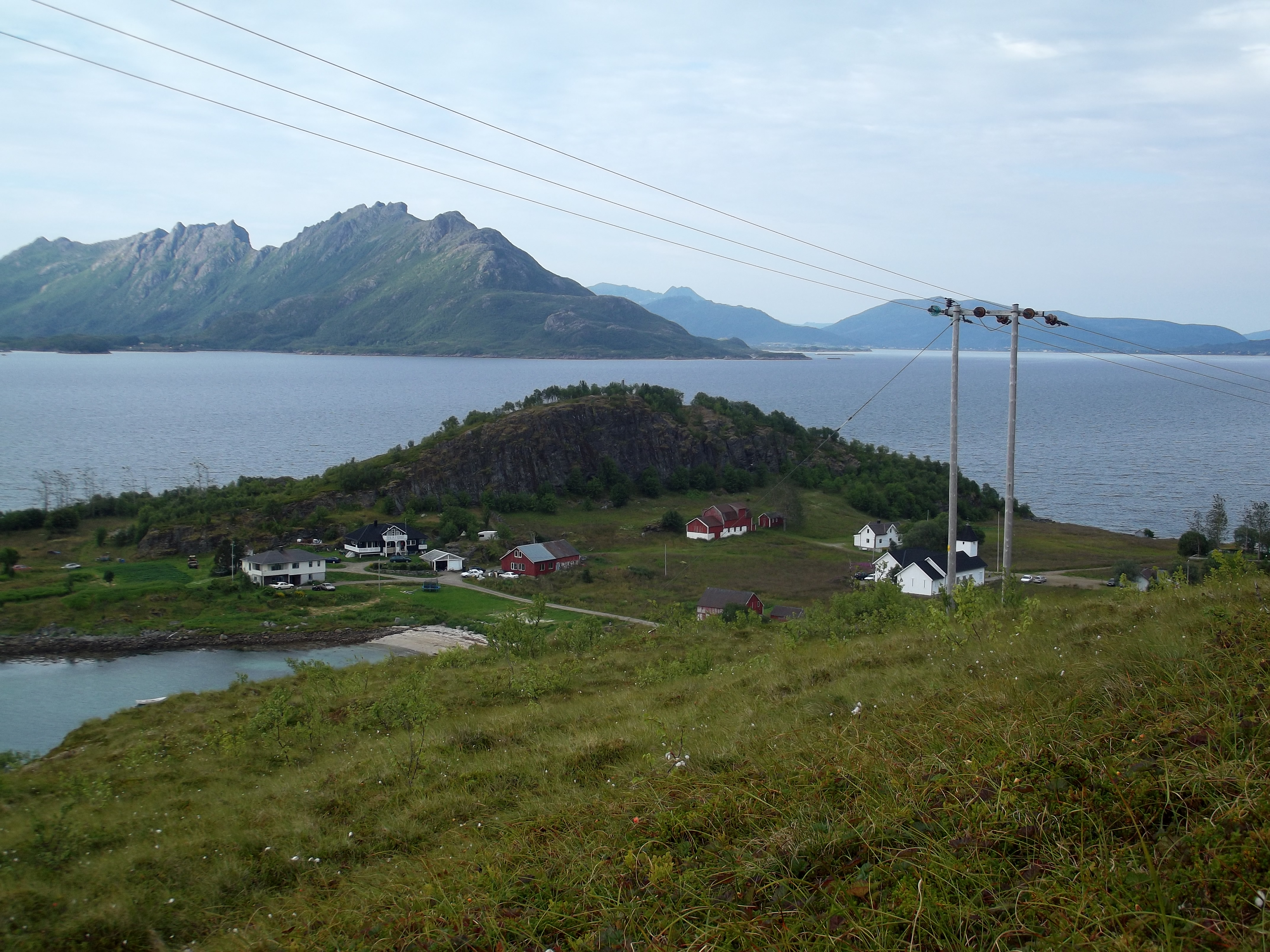
- View of the village
- Interactive map of Grønning
- Location within Nordland Location within Norway
- Coordinates: 68.6667°N 14.9469°E
- Country: Norway
- Region: Northern Norway
- County: Nordland
- District: Vesterålen
- Municipality: Hadsel Municipality
- Elevation: 9 m (30 ft)
- Time zone: UTC+01:00 (CET)
  - Summer (DST): UTC+02:00 (CEST)
- Post Code: 8450 Stokmarknes

Grønning (Norwegian) or Gronnegak (Northern Sami) is a small village in Hadsel Municipality in Nordland county, Norway. The village is located along the Eidsfjorden on the island of Langøya, about 15 kilometres (9.3 mi) north of the village of Sandnes. The tiny village area is home to Grønning Church, which serves the northern part of Hadsel Municipality.
