= Hadsel Bridge =

Hadsel Bridge Hadselbrua
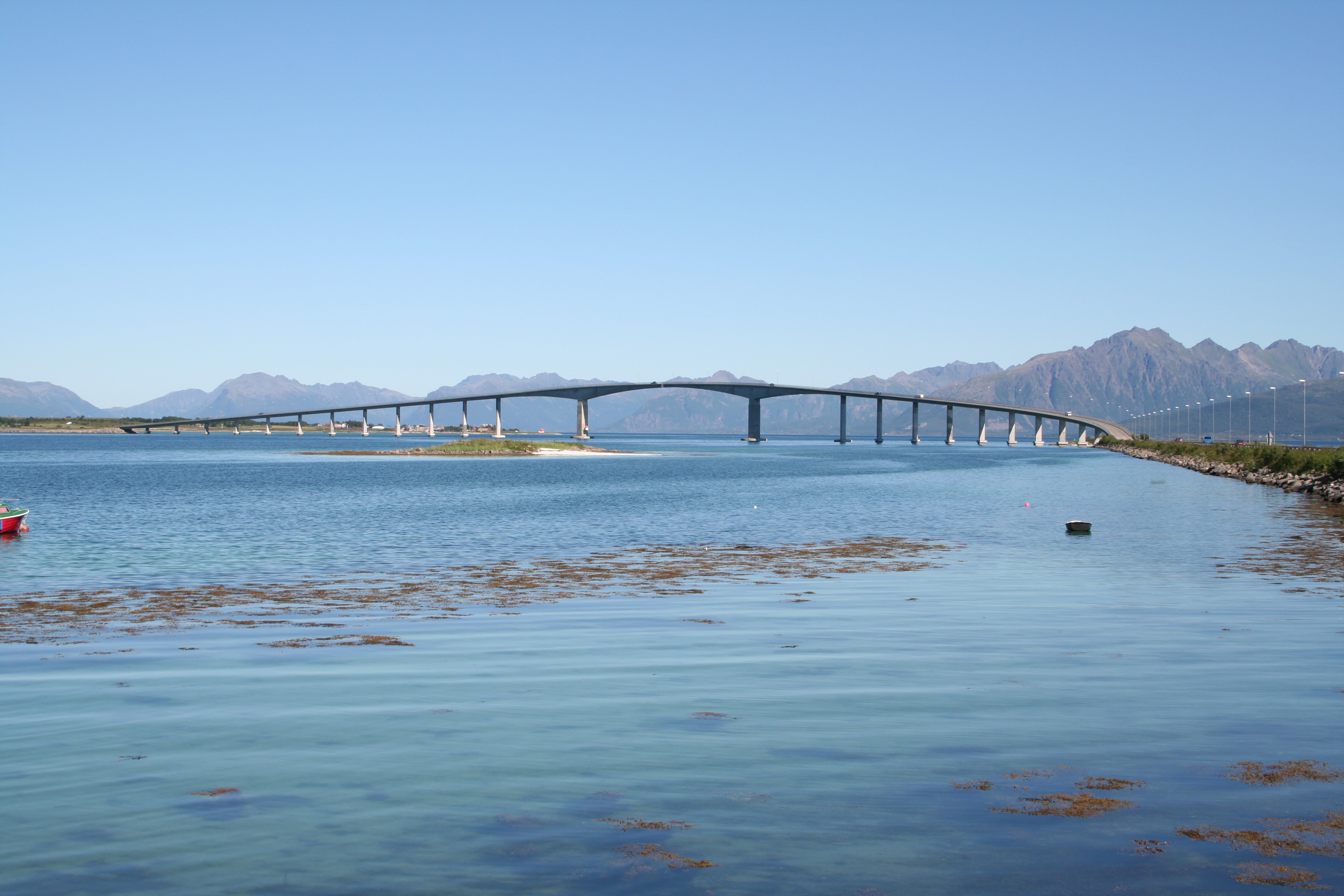
- View of the bridge
- Coordinates: 68°34′29″N 14°59′51″E
- Carries: Fv82
- Crosses: Langøysundet
- Locale: Hadsel, Norway

Characteristics
- Material: Concrete
- Total length: 1,011 metres (3,317 ft)
- Longest span: 150 metres (490 ft)
- No. of spans: 27
- Clearance below: 30 metres (98 ft)

History
- Construction start: 1976
- Construction end: 1978

The Hadsel Bridge (Norwegian: Hadselbrua) is a cantilever road bridge in Hadsel Municipality in Nordland county, Norway. The bridge carries Norwegian County Road 82 and it crosses the Langøysundet strait between the islands of Langøya and Børøya. Together with the Børøy Bridge it connects the island of Hadseløya and the town of Stokmarknes to the neighboring island of Langøya. The Hadsel Bridge is 1,011 metres (3,317 ft) long, the main span is 150 metres (490 ft), and the maximum clearance to the sea is 30 metres (98 ft). The bridge has a total of 27 spans.

The Hadsel Bridge was opened in 1978. It was one of 4 bridges that were built in the 1970s to connect the islands of Vesterålen to each other. The other bridges that were built during that period are the Sortland Bridge, Andøy Bridge, and Kvalsaukan Bridge. Together with the Tjeldsund Bridge near the town of Harstad, these bridges connect the islands of Vesterålen to the mainland.

Before the bridge was built, a ferry carried passengers across the sound between Sandnes on Langøya and the town of Stokmarknes on Hadseløya. When the bridge was first opened, it was a toll bridge, but it is not anymore.

== See also ==
- List of bridges in Norway
- List of bridges in Norway by length
- List of bridges
- List of bridges by length
