= Innlandet Church =

Church in Nordland, Norway

- Innlandet kirke
- Innlandet Church
- 68.53344229°N 15.1983685°E
- Location: Hadsel, Nordland
- Country: Norway
- Denomination: Church of Norway
- Churchmanship: Evangelical Lutheran

History
- Former name: Hennes kapell
- Status: Parish church
- Founded: 1992
- Consecrated: 1992

Architecture
- Functional status: Active
- Architectural type: Long church
- Completed: 1992 (34 years ago)

Specifications
- Capacity: 100
- Materials: Wood

Administration
- Diocese: Sør-Hålogaland
- Deanery: Vesterålen prosti
- Parish: Hadsel

Innlandet Church (Norwegian: Innlandet kirke) is a parish church of the Church of Norway in Hadsel Municipality in Nordland county, Norway. It is located in the village of Hennes on the island of Hinnøya. It is one of the churches for the Hadsel parish which is part of the Vesterålen prosti (deanery) in the Diocese of Sør-Hålogaland. The white, wooden church was built in a long church style in 1992 to serve the part of Hadsel municipality on the island of Hinnøya. The church seats about 100 people. The church was historically called Hennes kapell (chapel).

== See also ==
- List of churches in Sør-Hålogaland
