= Sommer-Melbu =

Summer festival in Melbu, Norway

Sommer-Melbu is an annual summer festival in Melbu, Norway, usually with seminars on literature and philosophy. Concerts, art exhibitions, organized leisure trips with sightseeing (often by boat/car or on foot), and activities for adults and children are usually on the program. The festival has been held yearly since the mid-1980s.

== See also ==
- www.sommermelbu.no
- www.nordland-akademi.no
