= Oddbjørn Knutsen =

Norwegian political scientist (1953–2019)

Oddbjørn Knutsen (23 July 1953 – 11 August 2019) was a Norwegian political scientist.

He was born in Hadsel Municipality. After taking the dr.philos. degree in 1985 with the thesis Politiske verdier, konfliktlinjer og ideologi – den norske politiske kulturen i komparativt perspektiv he worked at the Institute for Social Research from 1986 to 1992. From 1993 he was a professor at the University of Oslo, serving until his death at age 66 in 2019.

He was a member of the Norwegian Academy of Science and Letters, He chaired the Norwegian Political Science Association from 2010 to 2017 and the Nordic Political Science Association from 2011 to 2014, and was a board member of the European Consortium for Political Research from 2018 to his death.
