= Børøya =

Island in Nordland, Norway

Børøya (Norwegian); Bierák (Northern Sami)
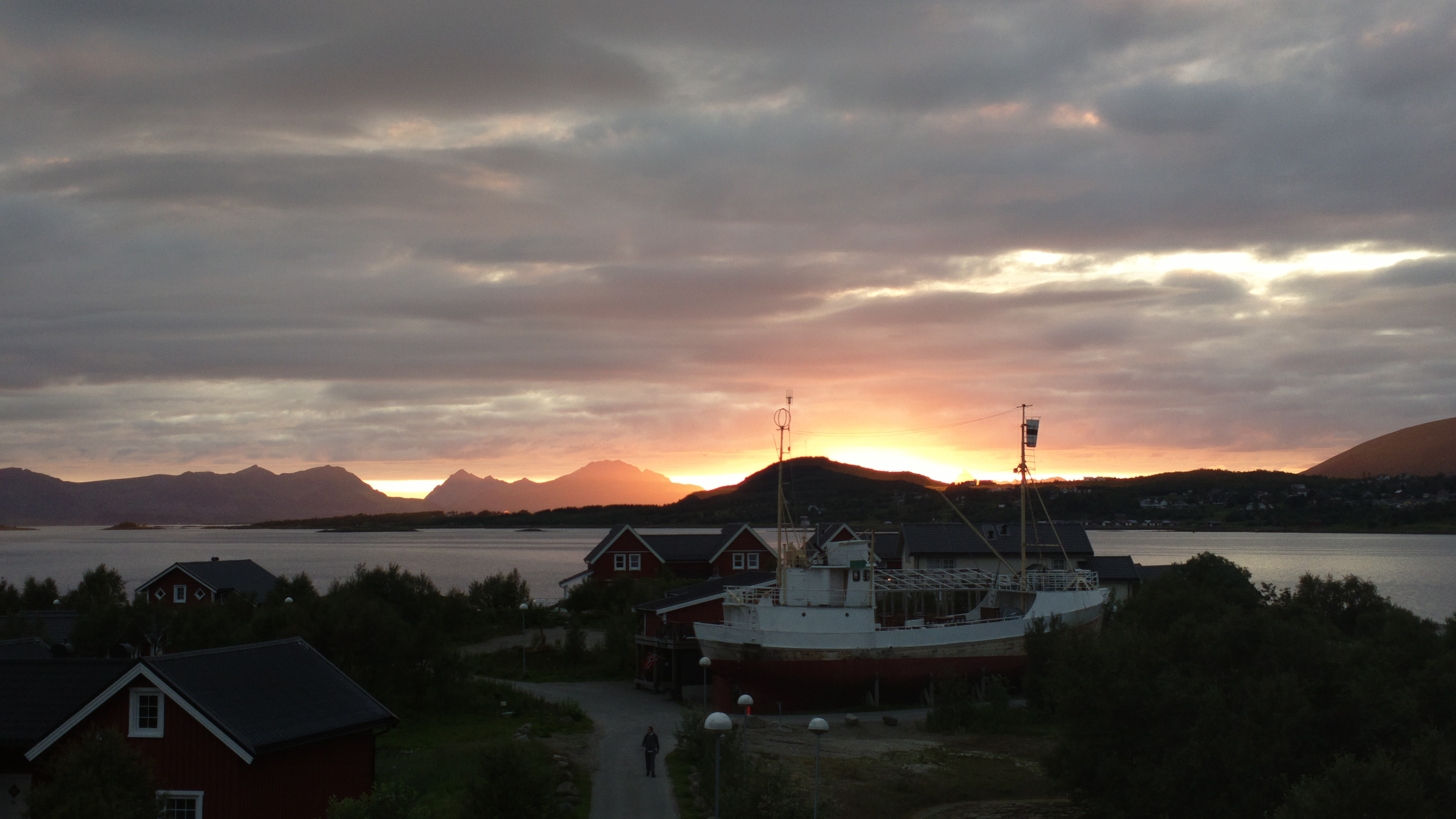
- Interactive map of: Børøya (Norwegian); Bierák (Northern Sami)

Geography
- Location: Nordland, Norway
- Coordinates: 68.5705°N 14.9305°E
- Archipelago: Vesterålen
- Area: 1.4 km^{2} (0.54 sq mi)
- Length: 1.9 km (1.18 mi)
- Width: 1.2 km (0.75 mi)
- Highest elevation: 52 m (171 ft)

Administration
- Norway
- County: Nordland
- Municipality: Hadsel Municipality

Børøya (Norwegian) or Bierák (Northern Sami) is a small island in Hadsel Municipality in Nordlandcounty, Norway. The island is located in the Langøysundet strait between the island of Langøya and the town of Stokmarknes on the island of Hadseløya. Børøya has an area of 1.4 square kilometres (0.54 sq mi) and the highest point on the island is 52 metres (171 ft) above sea level. Norwegian County Road 82 runs across the island connecting it to Langøya and Hadseløya. In the east, the Hadsel Bridge connects with Langøya. In the west, a short bridge connects the island to Stokmarknes.

On Børøya, there is a large residential area and several businesses. For many years there was a mall on Børøya, but the building is now used by NorEngros Health Service Wholesale.

== History ==
Hadsel Municipality purchased Børøya in 1963 and planned to build residential and industrial areas on the island. The municipality funded and built the bridge over to the island; it was officially opened on 1 July 1967. A grocery center was established on Børøya in 1971.

== See also ==
- List of islands of Norway
