= Norwegian Fishing Industry Museum =

Fishing museum in Melbu, Norway

Coordinates: 68°29′43″N 14°48′27″E

The Norwegian Fishing Industry Museum (Norwegian: Norsk fiskeindustrimuseum) is a national museum in Melbu in Vesterålen, Norway. The museum was established in the spring of 1991 and is housed in the building of the former Neptune Herring Oil Factory (Neptun sildeoljefabrikk). The museum has collected some technical equipment and other cultural history material from the fishing industry in the museum, but the primary activity offered at the premises is experience and presentation of information.

Through exhibitions, films, and multimedia, the museum informs visitors about the history of the Norwegian fishing industry, focusing on the relationship between industry and the local community. The Norwegian Fishing Industry Museum offers nationwide coverage of its field and has a national function. The museum is one of 21 units in Museum Nord.
