= Kaldjorda =

Village in Hadsel Municipality, Norway

Kaldjorda Kaldjord / Kaljord (historic spelling)
- Village
- Interactive map of Kaldjorda
- Location within Nordland Location within Norway
- Coordinates: 68.5256°N 15.2733°E
- Country: Norway
- Region: Northern Norway
- County: Nordland
- District: Vesterålen
- Municipality: Hadsel Municipality
- Elevation: 7 m (23 ft)
- Time zone: UTC+01:00 (CET)
  - Summer (DST): UTC+02:00 (CEST)
- Post Code: 8414 Hennes

Kaldjorda is a village in Hadsel Municipality in Nordland county, Norway. The village is located along the Hadselfjorden on the island of Hinnøya. The area surrounding Kaldjorda is known as Innlandet or Hadsel Innland and it includes the neighboring villages of Hennes, Kvitnes, Kvantoelv, and Fiskfjord.

There are approximately 600 people that live in the area. Kaldjorda lies at the east end of the main road, with shops, petrol stations, a quay, and a ferry terminal (with connections to Lonkan and Hanøyvika, along the E10 highway). There used to also be farms and a boat company in and around Kaldjorda. Møysalen National Park is located a short distance to the east.
