= Neptune Herring Oil Factory =

Former factory in Melbu, Vesterålen, Norway

Coordinates: 68°29′43″N 14°48′27″E

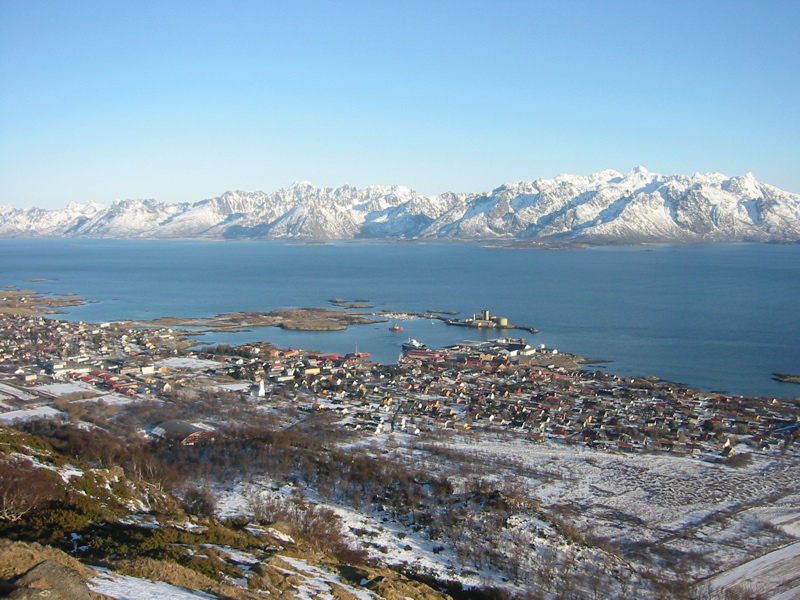
The Neptune Herring Oil Factory is located on an island in the harbor outside Melbu.

The Neptune Herring Oil Factory (Norwegian: Neptun sildeoljefabrikk) is a former industry in the town of Melbu in Norway's Vesterålen district. It has been given cultural heritage status.

The factory was set up in 1910. For a long time, production was based on herring. When herring was no longer available as raw material, the factory switched to using capelin. In the 1980s, the supply of this fish as raw material also failed, and the factory shut down in 1987. All of its equipment was sold to Morocco.

During the 1900s there were many factories of this type in the Norwegian fisheries, and few of them are preserved today. Many of them, like the Neptune factory, were established at the beginning of the century and were shut down in the 1980s. The Neptune Herring Oil Factory was added to the list of priority technical and industrial cultural heritage by the Norwegian Directorate for Cultural Heritage. This list comprises several facilities of different types, and it is based on extensive registration work. The conservation of the factory in Melbu focuses on preserving herring oil factories.

Starting in 1991, the buildings were managed as part of the Norwegian Fishing Industry Museum, which was established in the spring of 1991. The Norwegian Fishing Industry Museum offers nationwide coverage of its field and has a national function.
