= Møysalen National Park =

National park in Nordland, Norway

- IUCN category II (national park)

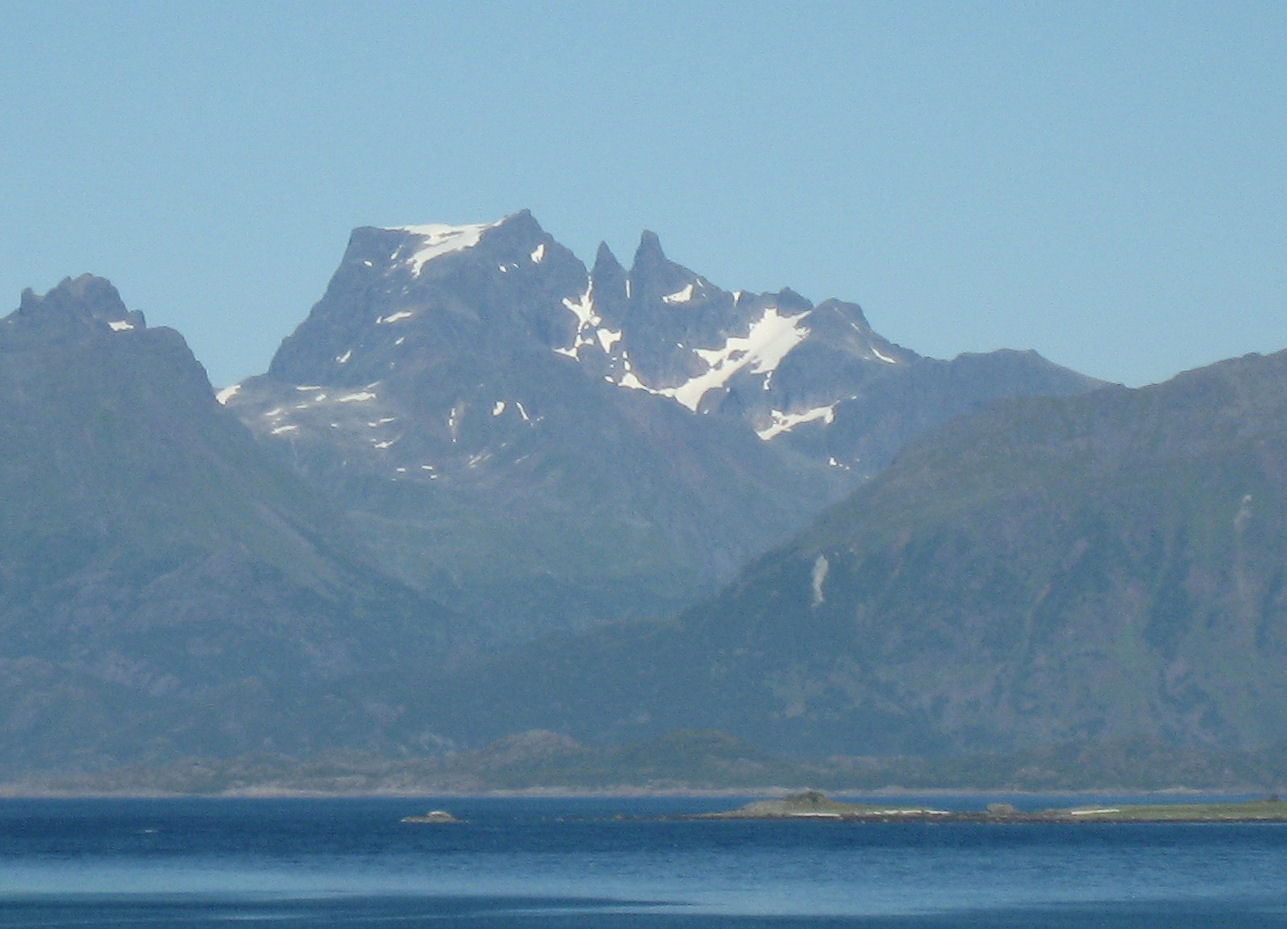
- Interactive map of Møysalen National Park
- Location: Nordland, Norway
- Nearest city: Sortland
- Coordinates: 68°31′N 15°30′E
- Area: 51 km^{2} (20 sq mi)
- Established: 2003
- Governing body: Directorate for Nature Management

Møysalen National Park (Norwegian: Møysalen nasjonalpark) is a national park located on the island of Hinnøya in Nordland county, Norway. The park was established in 2003 to preserve undisturbed coastal alpine landscape. The scenery is characterized by peaks jutting out of the ocean and fjords, the highest point is the 1,262-metre (4,140 ft) tall Møysalen mountain. The park mostly lies in Lødingen Municipality, but the far northern part crosses over into Sortland Municipality.

The park is largely undisturbed from its natural state. This is one of very few national parks in Norway that goes all the way down to sea level; the Vestpollen fjord branch of the Øksfjorden is included inside the national park. The park thus also includes areas with undisturbed birch forest in addition to the mountains. There are many fens and bogs in the park, but most are not large.

The steep mountains and rich seashores nearby with many seabirds, as well as populations of rodents, provide good hunting areas for several species of predatory birds including white tailed eagle, golden eagle, gyrfalcon, and peregrine falcon. A number of other rare and endangered birds of prey breed in the park, including kestrels, merlins, and rough-legged buzzards. The animal life is typical for this part of Nordland county. The Eurasian otter, regarded as a vulnerable species in Norway as a whole, is common here. The area around the Øksfjorden is a core area for moose on Hinnøya island. Other common species are hares, red foxes, stoats and American mink.
