= Hennes, Norway =

Village in Hadsel Municipality, Norway

Hennes
- Village
- Interactive map of Hennes
- Location within Nordland Location within Norway
- Coordinates: 68.5316°N 15.2284°E
- Country: Norway
- Region: Northern Norway
- County: Nordland
- District: Vesterålen
- Municipality: Hadsel Municipality
- Elevation: 6 m (20 ft)
- Time zone: UTC+01:00 (CET)
  - Summer (DST): UTC+02:00 (CEST)
- Post Code: 8414 Hennes

Hennes is a small village in Hadsel Municipality in Nordland county, Norway. The village is located just west of the village of Kaldjorda along the Hadselfjorden on the island of Hinnøya, about 12 kilometres (7.5 mi) east of the town of Stokmarknes. The village is home to Innlandet Church, which serves the eastern part of the municipality.
