= Hadsel Church =

Church in Nordland, Norway

- Hadsel kirke
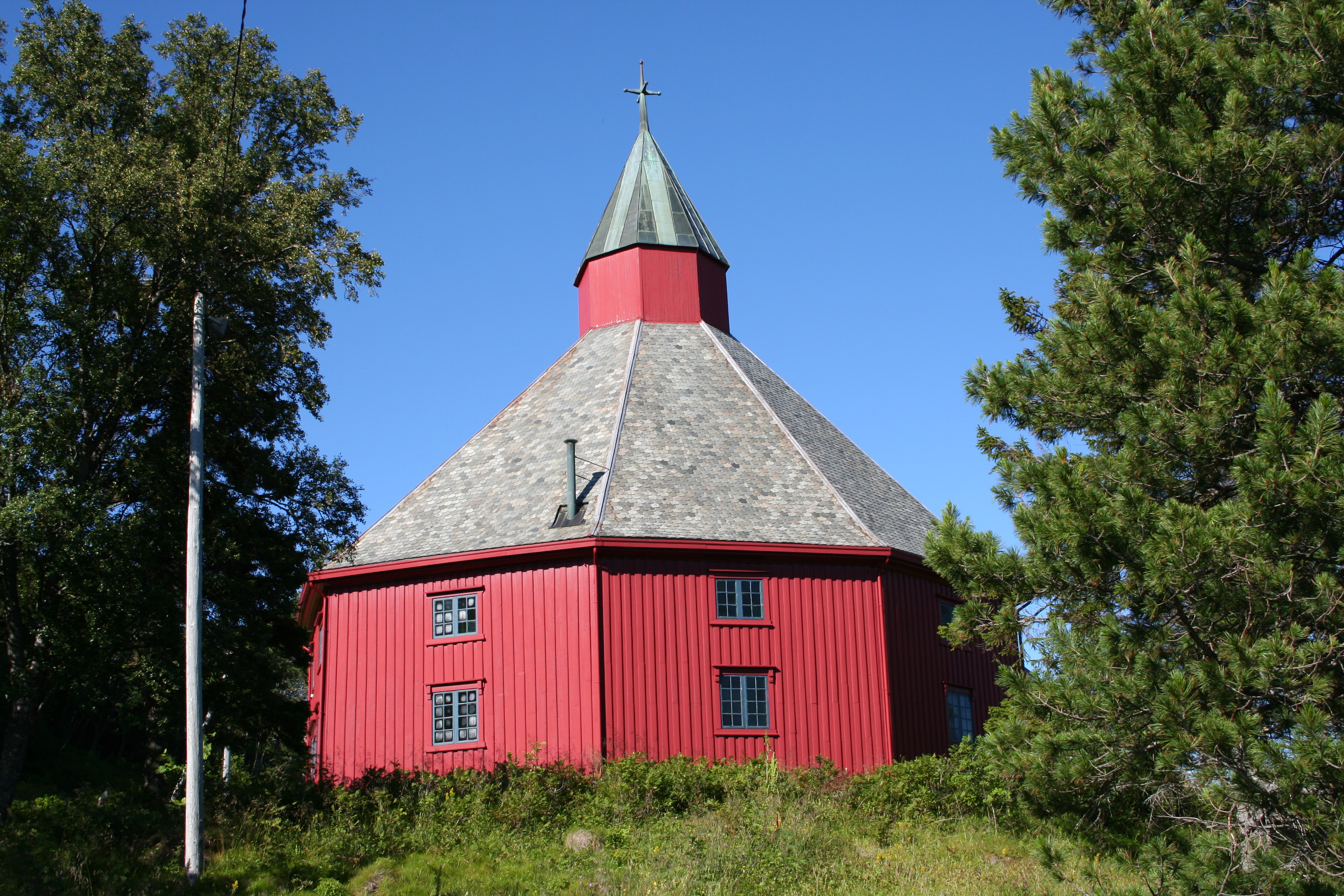
- View of the church
- Hadsel Church
- 68.5407543°N 14.99039679°E
- Location: Hadsel, Nordland
- Country: Norway
- Denomination: Church of Norway
- Churchmanship: Evangelical Lutheran

History
- Status: Parish church
- Founded: 1300s
- Dedication: St. Stephen
- Consecrated: 1824

Architecture
- Functional status: Active
- Architectural type: Octagonal
- Completed: 1824 (202 years ago)

Specifications
- Capacity: 500
- Materials: Wood

Administration
- Diocese: Sør-Hålogaland
- Deanery: Vesterålen prosti
- Parish: Hadsel
- Norwegian Cultural Heritage Site
- Type: Church
- Status: Listed
- ID: 84458

Hadsel Church (Norwegian: Hadsel kirke) is a parish church of the Church of Norway in Hadsel Municipality in Nordland county, Norway. It is located in the village of Hadsel, just east of the town of Stokmarknes on the island of Hadseløya. It is one of the churches for the Hadsel parish which is part of the Vesterålen prosti (deanery) in the Diocese of Sør-Hålogaland. The red, wooden church was built in an octagonal style in 1824 by an unknown architect. The church seats about 500 people.

== History ==
The earliest mention of this church in existing historical records was in 1381, but there are additional records that talk about the priest of Hadsel dating back to 1321. Not much is known about the church before the 1600s, but in 1639 an old church was demolished and a new log building in a cruciform design was built on the same location. The church is dedicated to St. Stephen.

In 1814, this church served as an election church (Norwegian: valgkirke). Together with more than 300 other parish churches across Norway, it was a polling station for elections to the 1814 Norwegian Constituent Assembly which wrote the Constitution of Norway. This was Norway's first national elections. Each church parish was a constituency that elected people called "electors" who later met together in each county to elect the representatives for the assembly that was to meet at Eidsvoll Manor later that year.

In 1824, a new church building was completed, about 100 metres (330 ft) west of the site of the old church. Two years later, in 1826, the old church building was torn down. This newest church is likely the fourth building on this site serving Hadsel.

== Media gallery ==
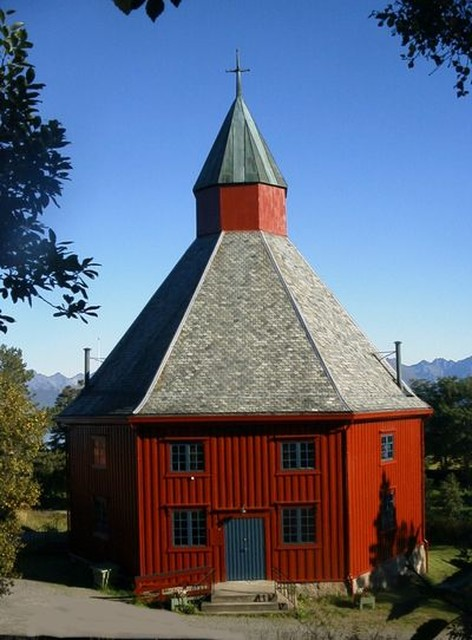

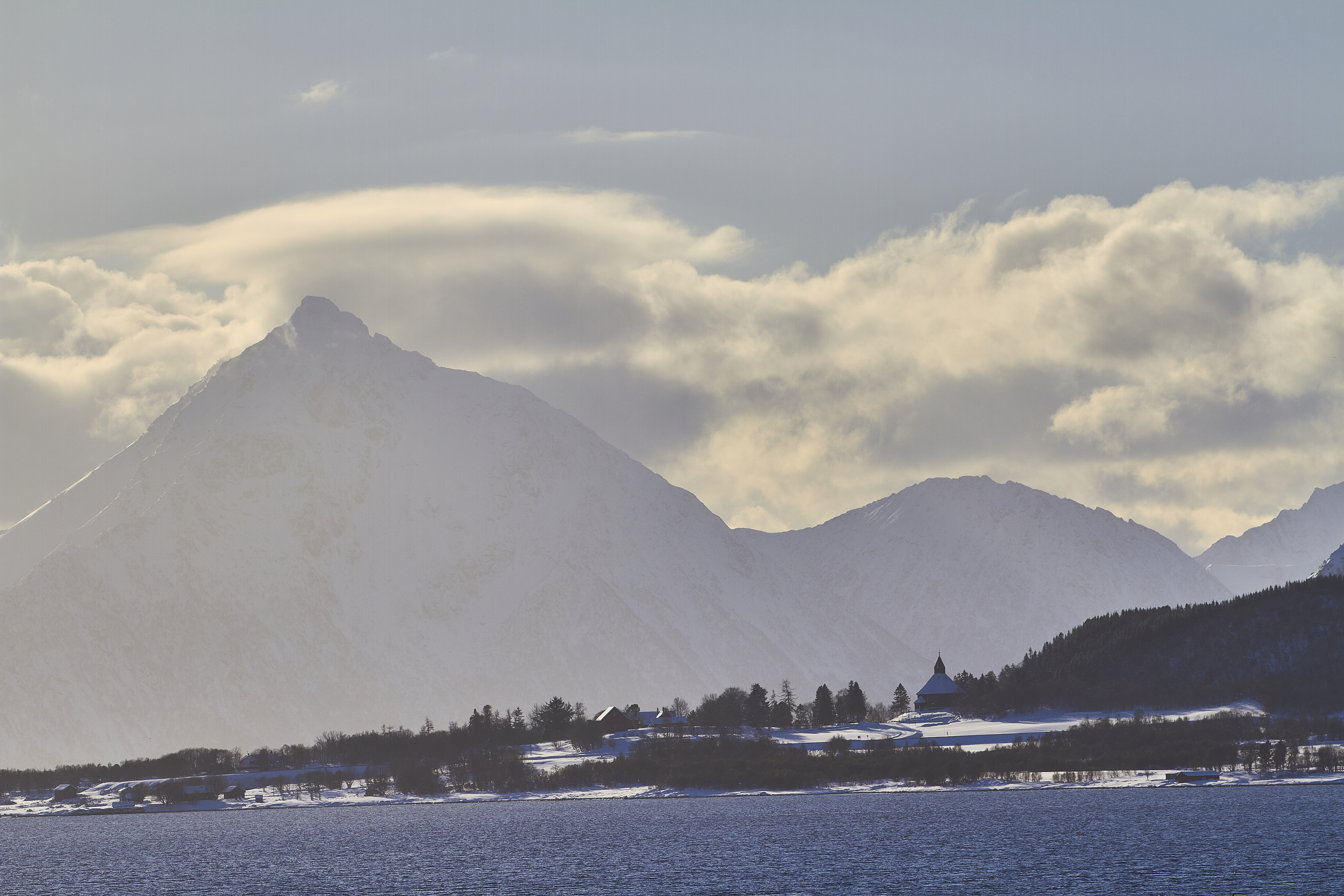

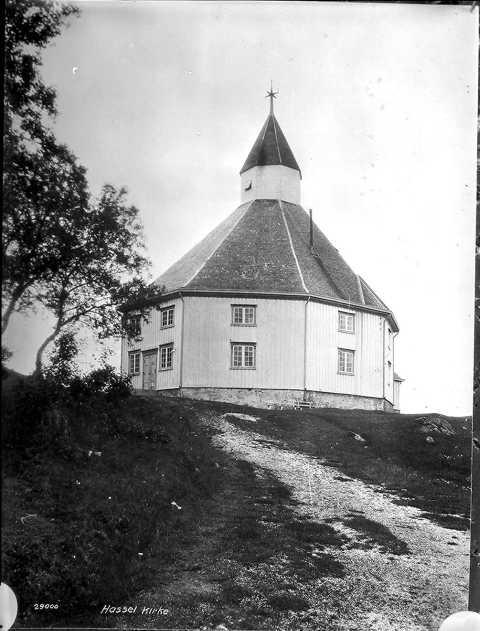
c. 1926

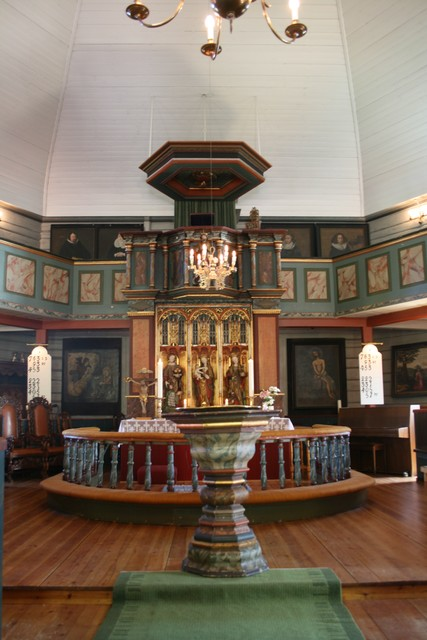

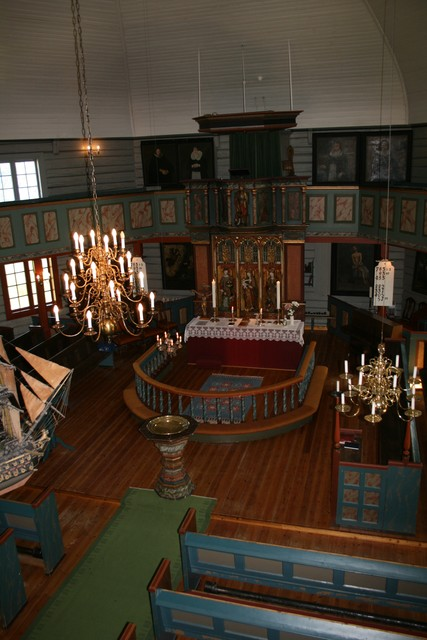

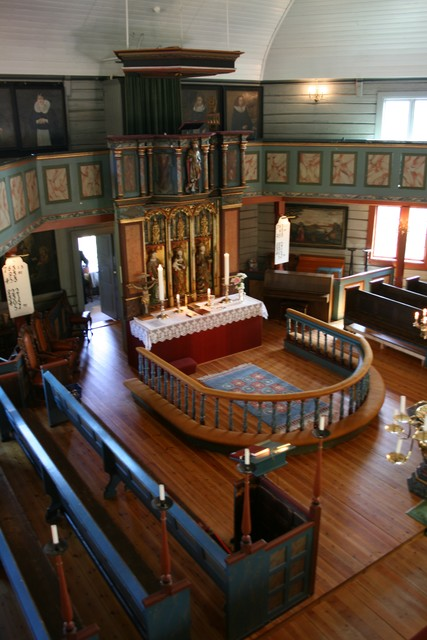

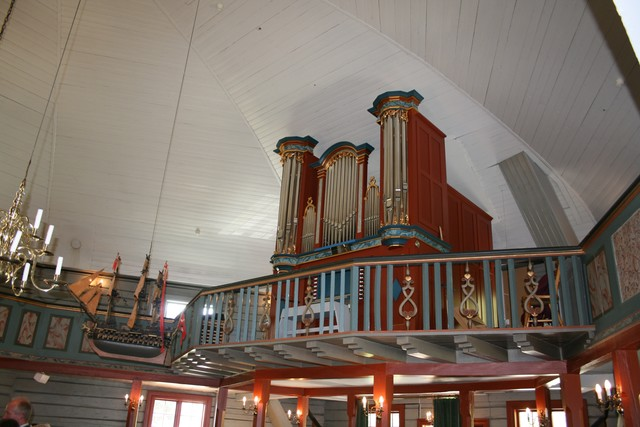

== See also ==
- List of churches in Sør-Hålogaland
- Octagonal churches in Norway
