= Sandnes, Nordland =

Village in Hadsel Municipality, Norway

Sandnes
- Village
- Interactive map of Sandnes
- Location within Nordland Location within Norway
- Coordinates: 68.5892°N 14.8990°E
- Country: Norway
- Region: Northern Norway
- County: Nordland
- District: Vesterålen
- Municipality: Hadsel Municipality

Area
  - Total: 0.46 km^{2} (0.18 sq mi)
- Elevation: 37 m (121 ft)

Population (2012)
  - Total: 322
  - Density: 700/km^{2} (1,800/sq mi)
- Time zone: UTC+01:00 (CET)
  - Summer (DST): UTC+02:00 (CEST)
- Post Code: 8450 Stokmarknes

Sandnes is a village in Hadsel Municipality in Nordland county, Norway. The village is located on the island of Langøya on the northern shore of the Langøysundet strait, across from the town of Stokmarknes.

The 0.46-square-kilometre (110-acre) village had a population (2012) of 322 and a population density of 700 inhabitants per square kilometre (1,800/sq mi). Since 2012, the population and area data for this village area has not been separately tracked by Statistics Norway.
