= Melbu =

Village in Hadsel Municipality, Norway

- Village
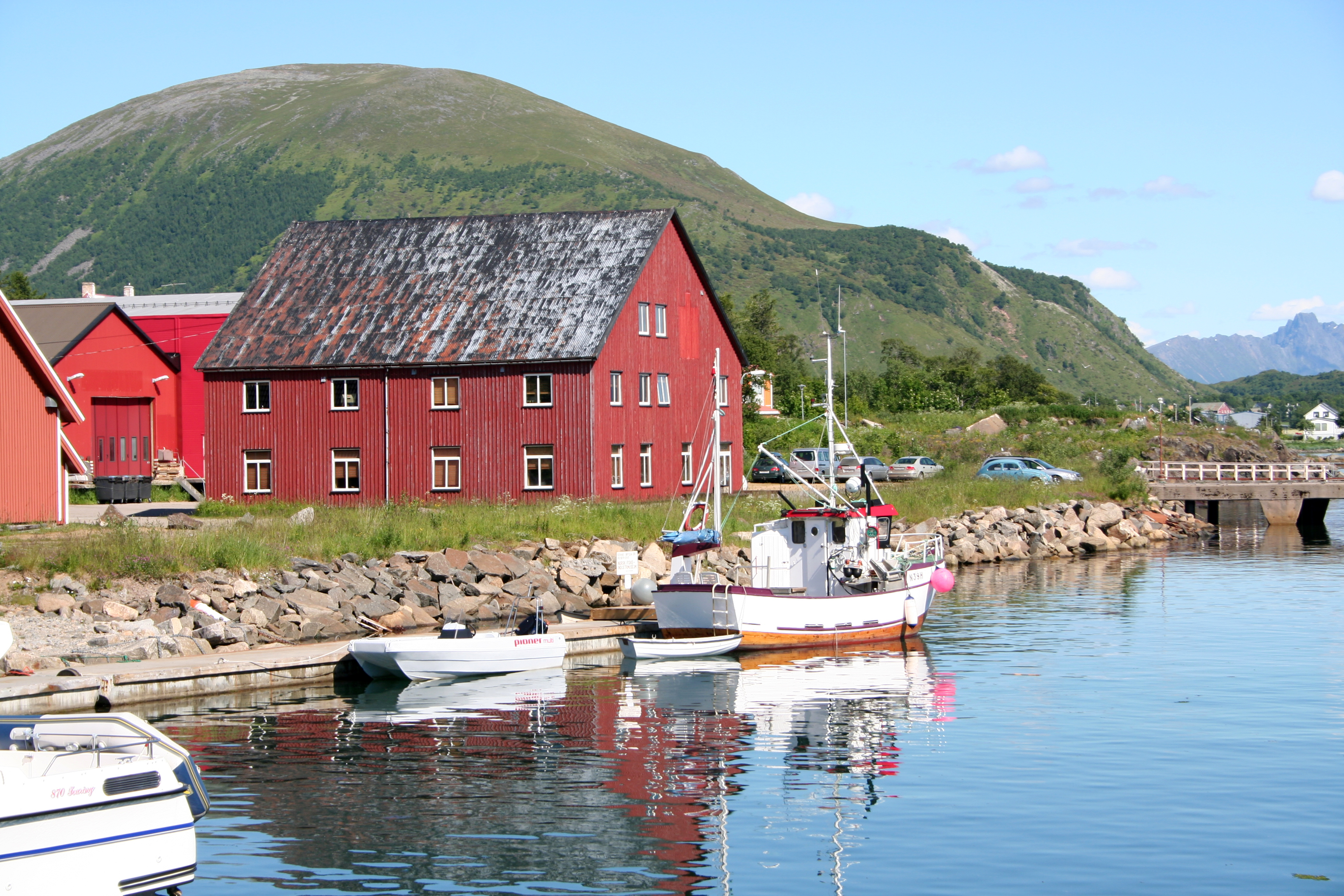
- View of the village
- Interactive map of Melbu
- Location within Nordland Location within Norway
- Coordinates: 68.5025°N 14.7996°E
- Country: Norway
- Region: Northern Norway
- County: Nordland
- District: Vesterålen
- Municipality: Hadsel Municipality

Area
  - Total: 1.68 km^{2} (0.65 sq mi)
- Elevation: 8 m (26 ft)

Population (2023)
  - Total: 2,257
  - Density: 1,343/km^{2} (3,480/sq mi)
- Time zone: UTC+01:00 (CET)
  - Summer (DST): UTC+02:00 (CEST)
- Post Code: 8445 Melbu

Melbu is a village in Hadsel Municipality in Nordland county, Norway. The village is located on the island of Hadseløya on the northern shore of the Hadselfjorden. Melbu is one of the two main population centres on the island of Hadseløya, and it is called "The Pearl of Vesteraalen". The other population centre is the town of Stokmarknes in the north. Melbu is host to the annual Sommer-Melbu festival. Its economy heavily relies on the fishing industry.

The 1.68-square-kilometre (420-acre) village has a population (2023) of 2,257 and a population density of 1,343 inhabitants per square kilometre (3,480/sq mi).

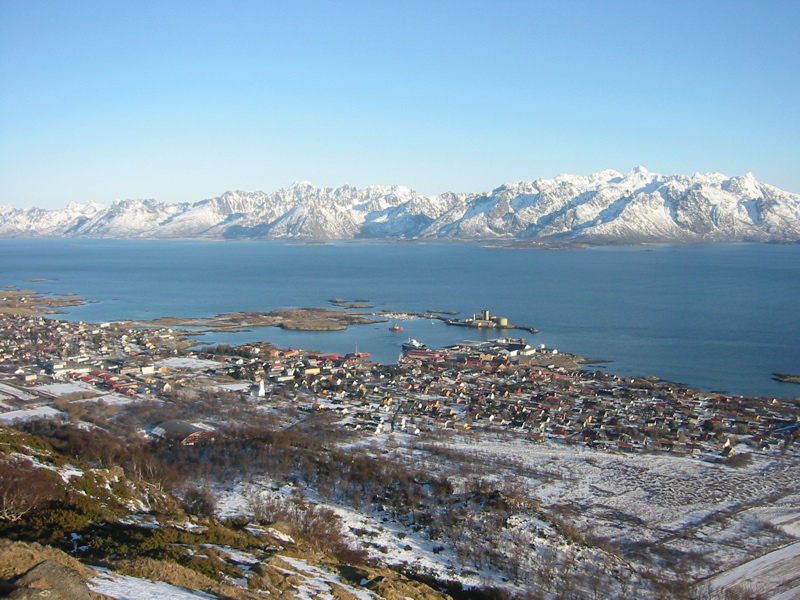
Melbu seen from the hill Haugnyken

Melbu Church is located in this village. Melbu is also a school centre in Vesterålen, and has a ferry connection to the village of Fiskebøl on the island of Austvågøya to the south via the Melbu-Fiskebøl Ferry. The nearest airport, Stokmarknes Airport, Skagen, is about 25 kilometres (16 mi) to the north.

The local sports team is Melbo IL.

== Economy ==
Melbu has one of the biggest fish processing facilities of Norway Seafoods/Aker Seafoods in Northern Norway. Several main factory trawler licenses are permanently related to the factory facilities in Melbu. There are also other industry facilities connected to fish processing, aquaculture, and other marine industry in Melbu. The Norwegian Fishing Industry Museum is located in the town's former Neptune Herring Oil Factory.
