= Hadselfjord =

Fjord in Nordland, Norway

- Hadselfjorden (Bokmål)
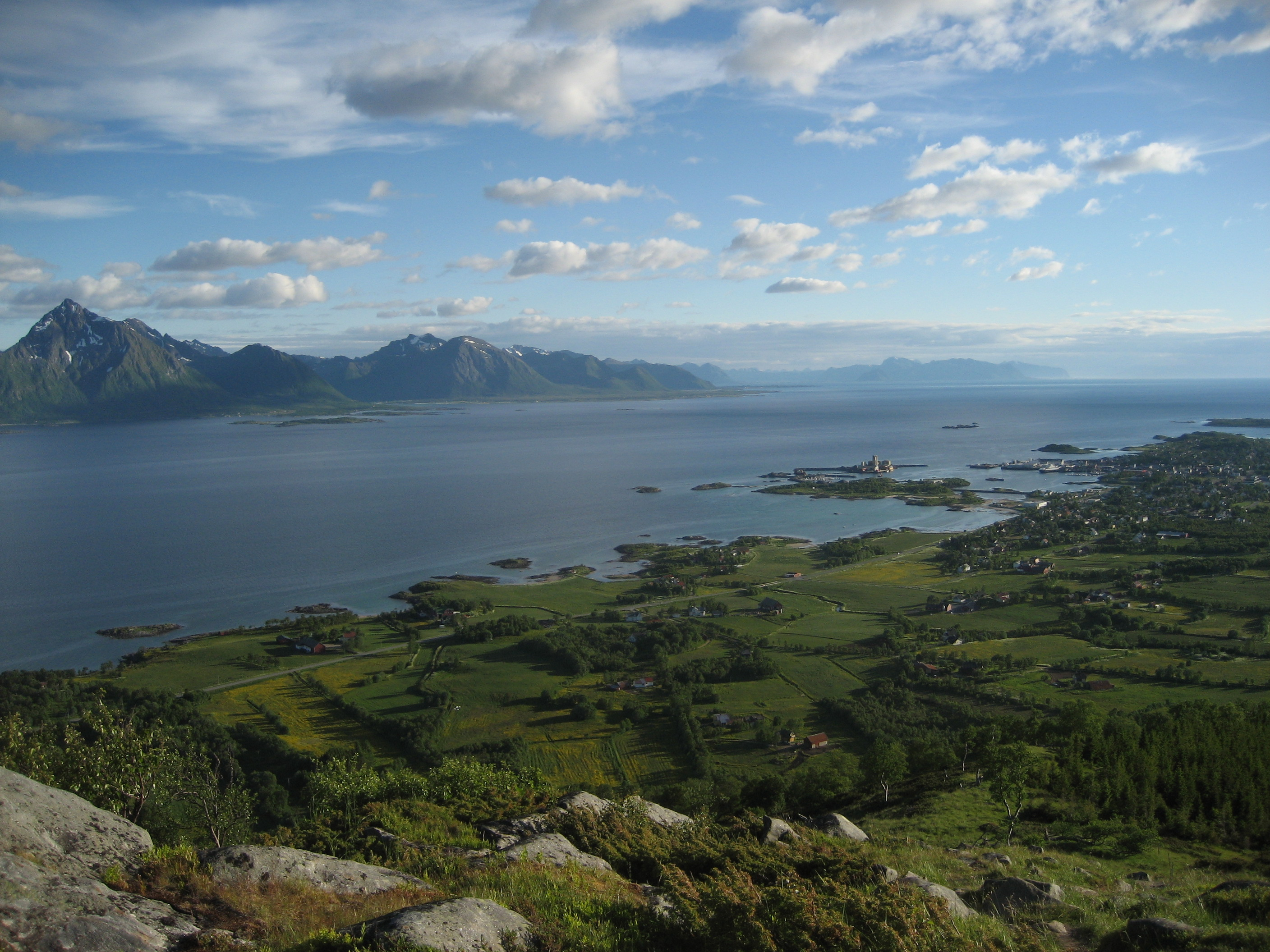
- View across the fjord (with Melbu village in the foreground)
- Interactive map of the fjord
- Location: Nordland county, Norway
- Coordinates: 68.4729°N 14.7655°E
- Type: Fjord
- Ocean/sea sources: Norwegian Sea
- Basin countries: Norway
- Max. length: 30 kilometres (19 mi)
- Max. width: 8 kilometres (5.0 mi)
- Settlements: Fiskebøl, Hennes, Melbu

Hadselfjorden or Hadselfjord is a fjord in Hadsel Municipality in Nordland county, Norway. The fjord lies in the Vesterålen region, separating the island of Hadseløya (on the north and west side of the fjord) from the islands of Austvågøya and Hinnøya island (on the south and east side of the fjord). In the northeast, the Hadselfjorden connects with Sortlandssund strait, which separates the islands of Langøya and Hinnøya. In the southwest the fjord empties into the Norwegian Sea.

A ferry crosses the fjord between the villages of Melbu and Fiskebøl.

== See also ==
- List of Norwegian fjords
