= Hadsel Municipality =

Municipality in Nordland, Norway

Hadsel Municipality Hadsel kommune
- Municipality
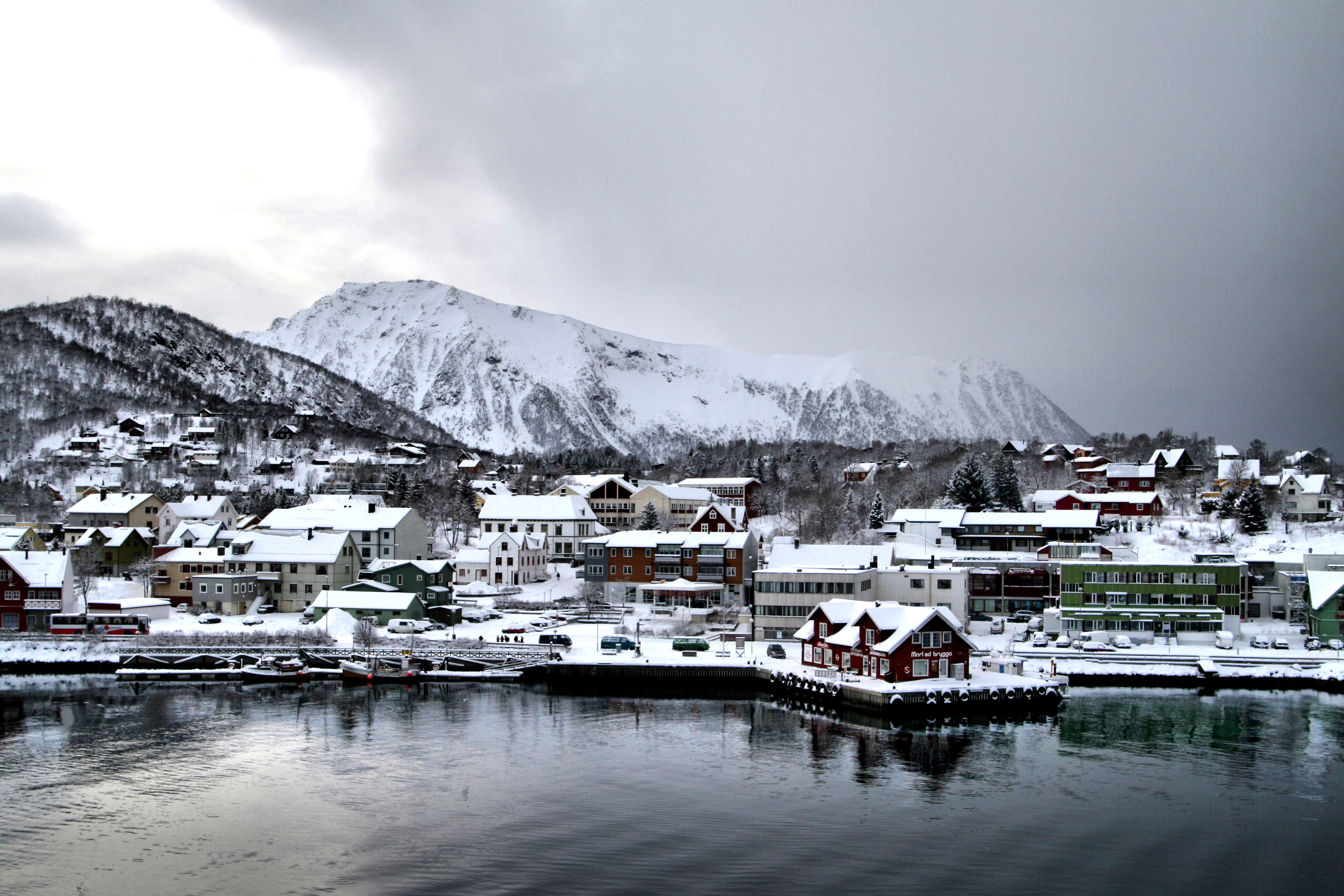
- View of Stokmarknes during the winter

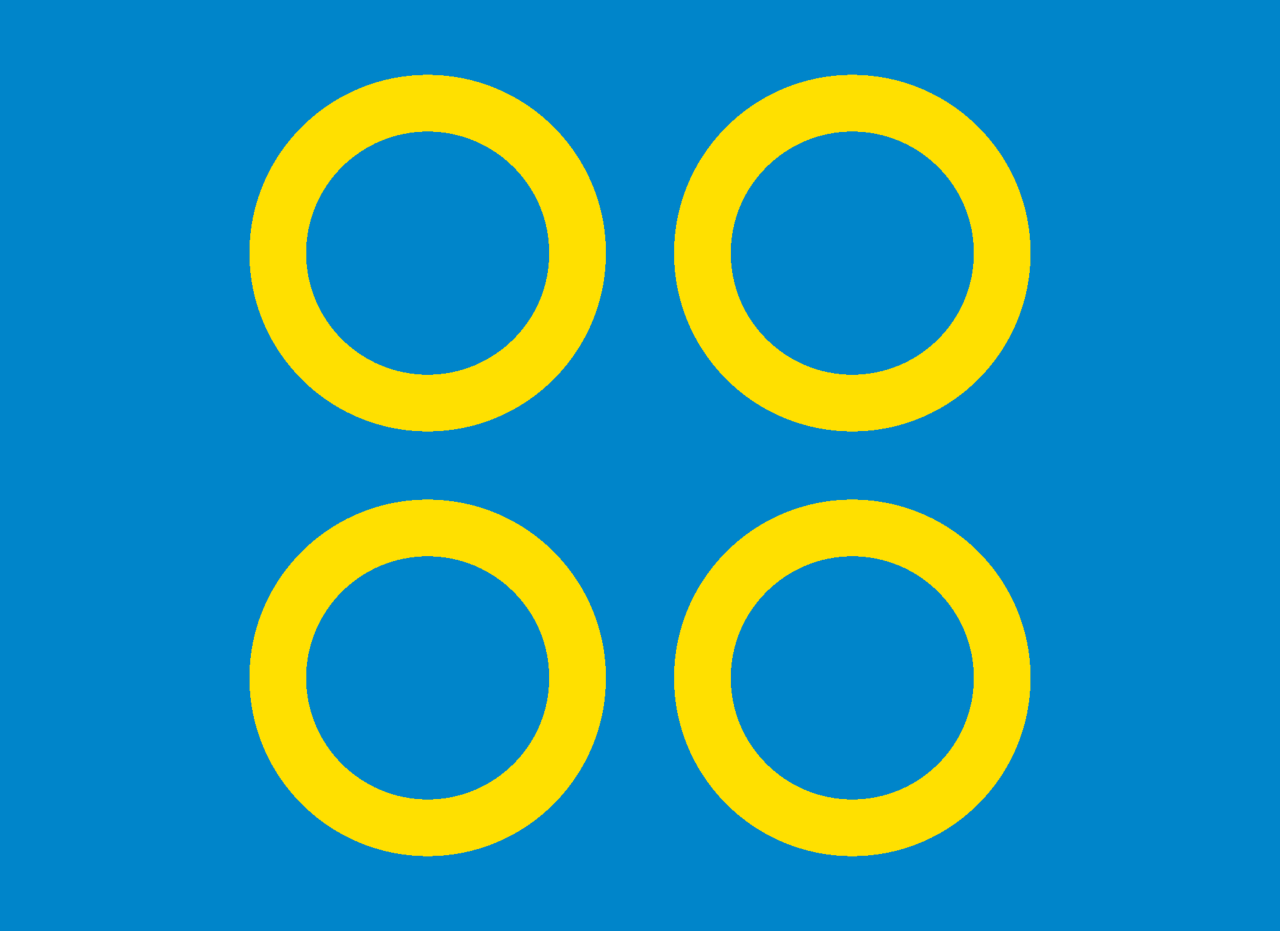
- Flag Coat of arms

- Nordland within Norway

- Hadsel within Nordland
- Coordinates: 68°32′06″N 14°49′30″E
- Country: Norway
- County: Nordland
- District: Vesterålen
- Established: 1 Jan 1838
  - Created as: Formannskapsdistrikt
- Administrative centre: Stokmarknes

Government
  - Mayor (2023): Kjell-Børge Freiberg (H)

Area
  - Total: 566.61 km^{2} (218.77 sq mi)
  - Land: 550.73 km^{2} (212.64 sq mi)
  - Water: 15.88 km^{2} (6.13 sq mi) 2.8%
  - Rank: #191 in Norway
- Highest elevation: 1,135.85 m (3,726.5 ft)

Population (2024)
  - Total: 8,236
  - Rank: #130 in Norway
  - Density: 14.5/km^{2} (38/sq mi)
  - Change (10 years): ▲ +1.5%
- Demonym: Hadselværing

Official language
  - Norwegian form: Bokmål
- Time zone: UTC+01:00 (CET)
  - Summer (DST): UTC+02:00 (CEST)
- ISO 3166 code: NO-1866
- Website: Official website

Hadsel (Northern Sami: Ulbi) is a municipality in Nordland county, Norway. It is part of the traditional district of Vesterålen. The administrative centre of the municipality is the town of Stokmarknes. Some of the main villages in Hadsel include Fiskebøl, Jarstad, Grønning, Grytting, Hanøyvika, Hennes, Kaldjorda, Melbu, Sanden, and Sandnes.

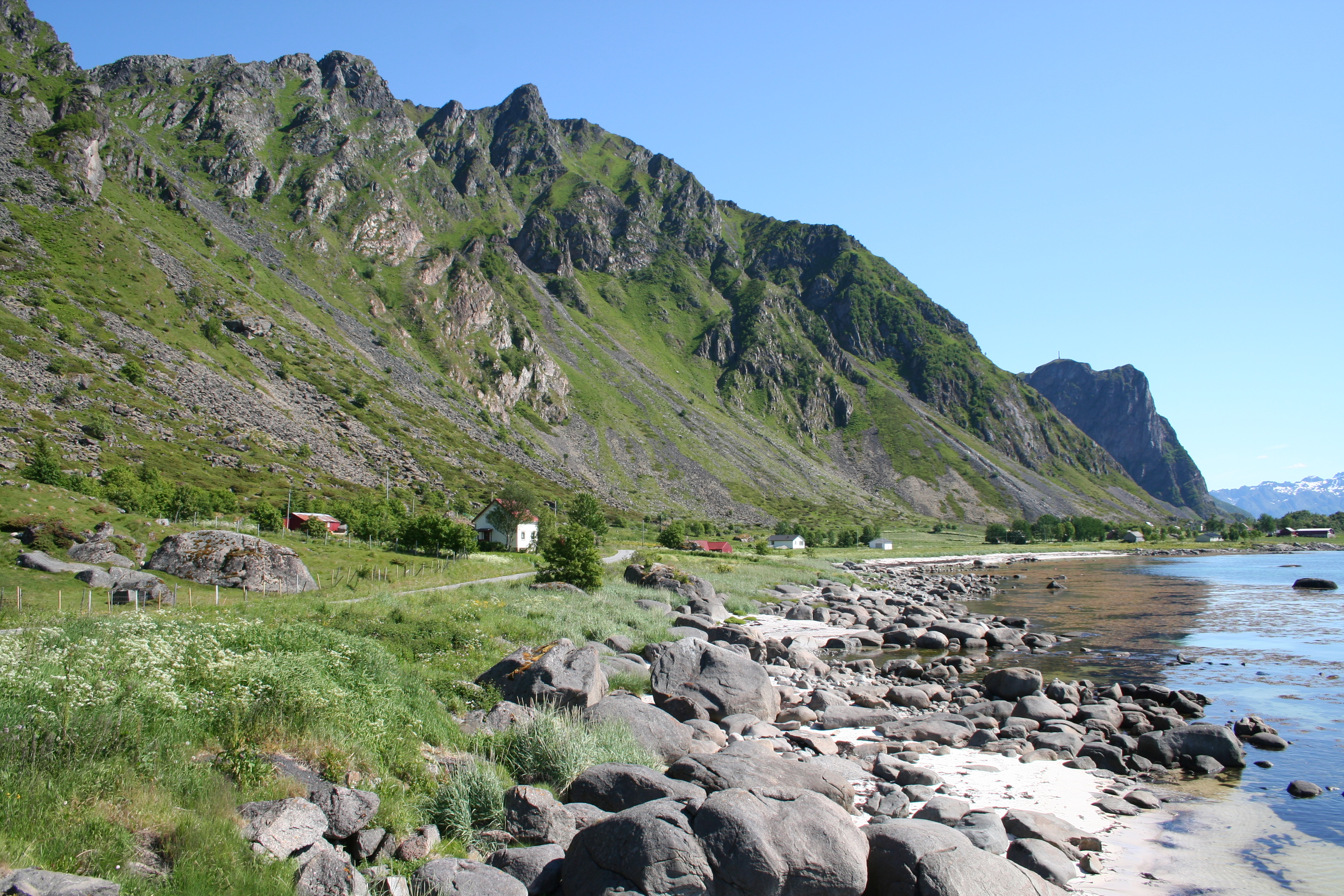
Taen, Hadseløya.

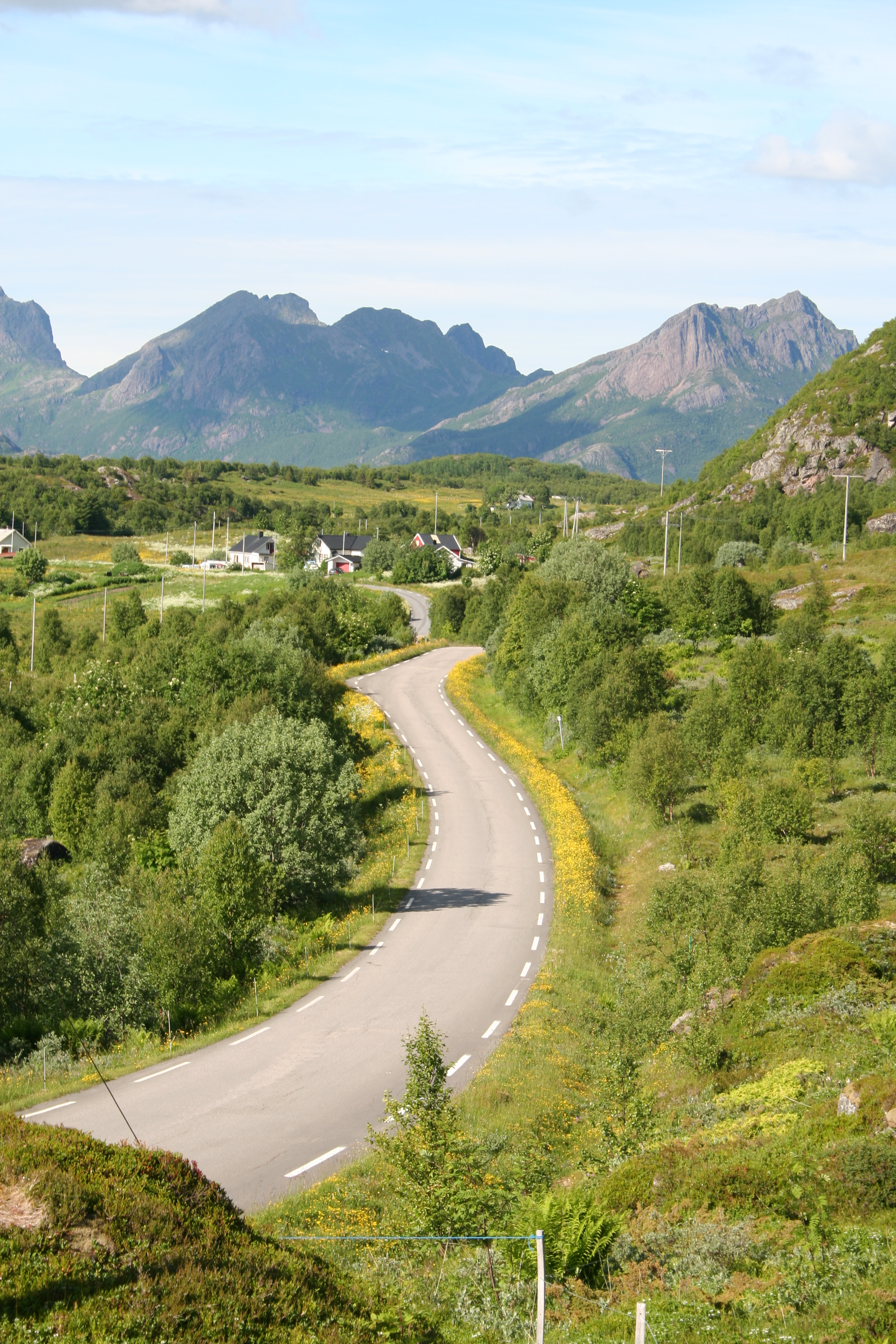
Road 885 in Hadsel

The municipality is the southernmost municipality in the Vesterålen region. It is spread over several main islands: Hadseløya, Børøya, Hinnøya, Langøya, and Austvågøya. About 70% of the population live on Hadseløya island. Hadseløya island is connected to Langøya by the Hadsel Bridge and Børøy Bridge. Also, the Stokmarknes Airport, Skagen, is located nearby. It is the busiest small aircraft airport in Norway, serving 100,000 passengers annually (1997).

The 567-square-kilometre (219 sq mi) municipality is the 191st largest by area out of the 357 municipalities in Norway. Hadsel Municipality is the 130th most populous municipality in Norway with a population of 8,236. The municipality's population density is 14.5 inhabitants per square kilometre (38/sq mi) and its population has increased by 1.5% over the previous 10-year period.

== History ==
Hadsel was established as a municipality on 1 January 1838 (see formannskapsdistrikt law). The northern district of Hadsel was separated in 1841 to form the new Sortland Municipality. During the 1960s, there were many municipal mergers across Norway due to the work of the Schei Committee. On 1 January 1963, the Indre Eidsfjord district of Hadsel (population: 1,360) was transferred to Sortland Municipality.

=== Name ===
The municipality (originally the parish) is named after the old Hadsel farm (Old Norse: Hǫfðasegl) since the first Hadsel Church was built there. The first element is the genitive case of hǫfði which means "high and steep cliff" or "head". The last element is segl which means "sail". (A cliff near the farm has been compared in form to a sail.)

=== Coat of arms ===
The coat of arms was granted on 11 March 1976. The official blazon is "Azure, four annulets Or, two and two" (Norwegian: I blått fire gull ringer - 2,2). This means the arms have a blue field (background) and the charge is four rings (two over two). The charge has a tincture of Or which means it is commonly colored yellow, but if it is made out of metal, then gold is used. The blue color in the field symbolizes the importance of sea for this island municipality. The four rings represent the four main islands of that make up Hadsel: Hadseløya, Austvågøya, Hinnøya, and Langøya. The arms were designed by Øystein Bottolfsen.

== Churches ==
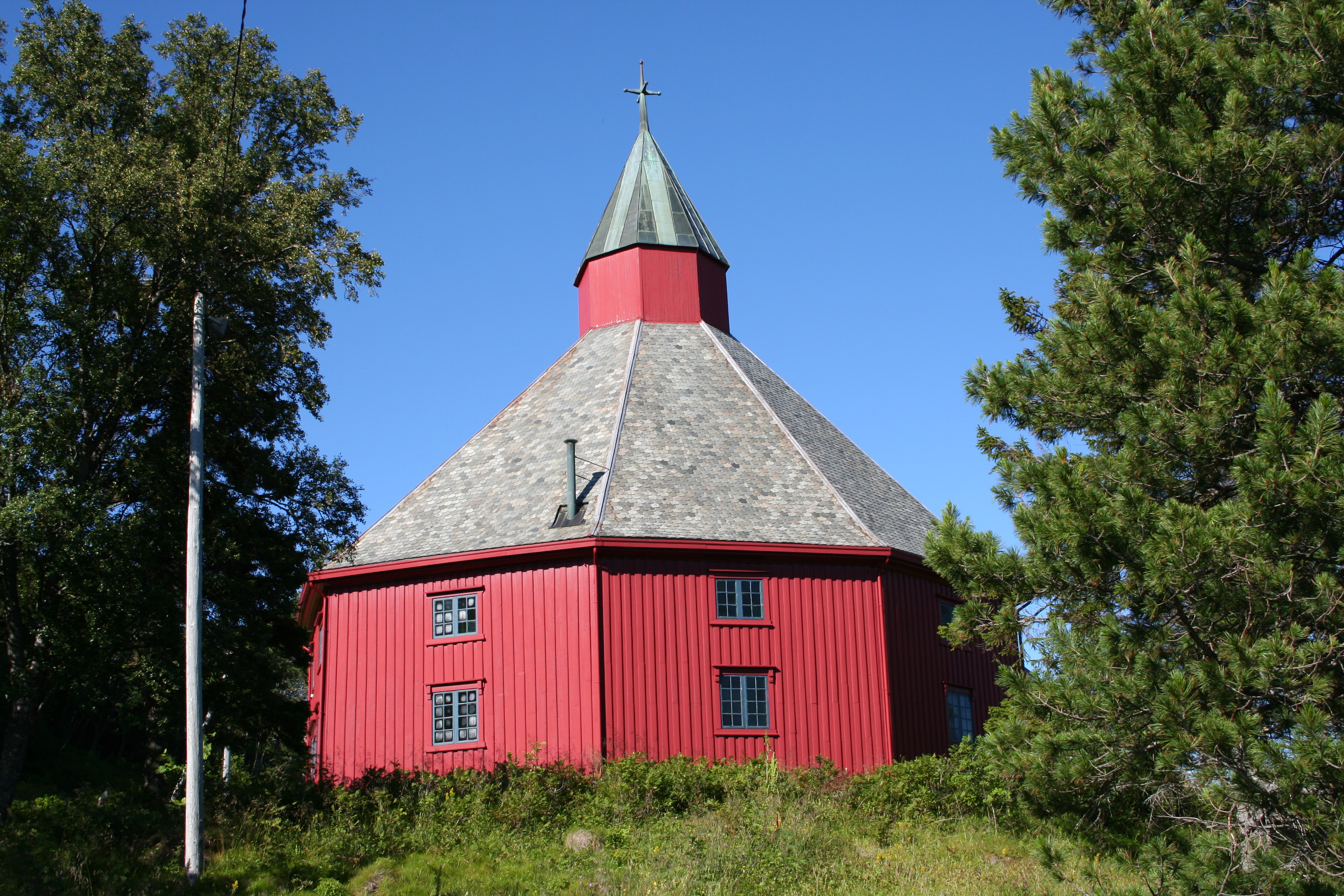
Hadsel Church

The Church of Norway has three parishes (sokn) within Hadsel Municipality. It is part of the Vesterålen prosti (deanery) in the Diocese of Sør-Hålogaland.

Churches in Hadsel Municipality
Parish (sokn)	Church name	Location of the church	Year built
Hadsel	Hadsel Church	Hadseløya	1824
Hadsel	Innlandet Church	Hennes	1992
Melbu	Melbu Church	Melbu	1938
Melbu	Sand Church	Sanden	1914
Ytre Eidsfjord	Grønning Church	Grønning	1968

== Geography ==
The municipality is located upon four main islands in the Vesterålen archipelago: Hinnøya, Langøya, Hadseløya, and Austvågøya, plus the small islands of Børøya and Brottøya. The 1,135.8-metre (3,726 ft) tall mountain Higravtindan is the highest point in the municipality. It is located on the border with Vågan Municipality and it is one of the tallest mountains in the whole region. Sortland Municipality lies to the north, Bø Municipality lies to the west, Vågan Municipality lies to the south, and Lødingen Municipality lies to the east.

Part of the municipality is called Innlandet (lit. 'the inland'), and this area includes the villages of Kaldjorda, Hennes, Kvitnes, Kvantoelv, and Fiskfjord.

=== Climate ===
Hadsel has a subpolar oceanic climate (Cfc). The warmest temperature recorded is 29 °C (84 °F) in July 2014. The coldest temperature recorded is −14.4 °C (6.1 °F) in March 2019. Stokmarknes Airport, Skagen in Hadsel has recorded temperature since June 1972. Data for extremes available since 2004, there might be warmer or colder temperatures recorded before 2004.

Climate data for Stokmarknes Airport Skagen 1991-2020 (3 m, precipitation 1961-90, extremes 2004-2025)
Month	Jan	Feb	Mar	Apr	May	Jun	Jul	Aug	Sep	Oct	Nov	Dec	Year
Record high °C (°F)	10 (50)	9.2 (48.6)	9.4 (48.9)	17.3 (63.1)	26.4 (79.5)	28.9 (84.0)	29 (84)	27.8 (82.0)	22.2 (72.0)	16.9 (62.4)	12.3 (54.1)	10.3 (50.5)	29 (84.0)
Mean daily maximum °C (°F)	1 (34)	1 (34)	2 (36)	6 (43)	10 (50)	13 (55)	16 (61)	15 (59)	12 (54)	7 (45)	4 (39)	3 (37)	8 (46)
Daily mean °C (°F)	−0.1 (31.8)	−0.7 (30.7)	−0.1 (31.8)	2.5 (36.5)	6.4 (43.5)	9.7 (49.5)	12.8 (55.0)	12.2 (54.0)	9.2 (48.6)	4.9 (40.8)	2.7 (36.9)	0.9 (33.6)	5.0 (41.1)
Mean daily minimum °C (°F)	−2 (28)	−2 (28)	−3 (27)	0 (32)	4 (39)	7 (45)	10 (50)	9 (48)	7 (45)	3 (37)	1 (34)	−1 (30)	3 (37)
Record low °C (°F)	−13.9 (7.0)	−13.9 (7.0)	−14.6 (5.7)	−10.5 (13.1)	−5.6 (21.9)	−0.1 (31.8)	3.2 (37.8)	1.2 (34.2)	−2.9 (26.8)	−7.6 (18.3)	−13 (9)	−11.1 (12.0)	−14.6 (5.7)
Average precipitation mm (inches)	110 (4.3)	95 (3.7)	83 (3.3)	69 (2.7)	49 (1.9)	50 (2.0)	65 (2.6)	68 (2.7)	107 (4.2)	155 (6.1)	123 (4.8)	126 (5.0)	1,100 (43.3)
Source 1: Norwegian Meteorological Institute
Source 2: weatheronline climate robot

== Economy ==
In Spring 2022, a company started mining of cryptocurrency at the company's facility in Stokmarknes; however, that activity had ended by Q3 2024. The facility [was using] around 40% of the power consumed in the whole municipality, heavily impacting the local electric grid.

== Government ==
Hadsel Municipality is responsible for primary education (through 10th grade), outpatient health services, senior citizen services, welfare and other social services, zoning, economic development, and municipal roads and utilities. The municipality is governed by a municipal council of directly elected representatives. The mayor is indirectly elected by a vote of the municipal council. The municipality is under the jurisdiction of the Midtre Hålogaland District Court and the Hålogaland Court of Appeal.

=== Municipal council ===
The municipal council (Kommunestyre) of Hadsel Municipality is made up of 25 representatives that are elected to four year terms. The tables below show the current and historical composition of the council by political party.

Hadsel kommunestyre 2023–2027
Party name (in Norwegian)	Number of representatives
Labour Party (Arbeiderpartiet)	3
Progress Party (Fremskrittspartiet)	1
Green Party (Miljøpartiet De Grønne)	1
Conservative Party (Høyre)	5
Industry and Business Party (Industri‑ og Næringspartiet)	1
Red Party (Rødt)	1
Centre Party (Senterpartiet)	3
Socialist Left Party (Sosialistisk Venstreparti)	2
Liberal Party (Venstre)	3
Melbu Area Cooperative List (Melbu og omegn samarbeidsliste)	5
Total number of members:	25

Hadsel kommunestyre 2019–2023
Party name (in Norwegian)	Number of representatives
Labour Party (Arbeiderpartiet)	4
Progress Party (Fremskrittspartiet)	1
Green Party (Miljøpartiet De Grønne)	1
Conservative Party (Høyre)	3
Red Party (Rødt)	2
Centre Party (Senterpartiet)	6
Socialist Left Party (Sosialistisk Venstreparti)	1
Liberal Party (Venstre)	3
Melbu Area Cooperative List (Melbu og omegn samarbeidsliste)	4
Total number of members:	25

Hadsel kommunestyre 2015–2019
Party name (in Norwegian)	Number of representatives
Labour Party (Arbeiderpartiet)	11
Progress Party (Fremskrittspartiet)	5
Conservative Party (Høyre)	2
Red Party (Rødt)	1
Centre Party (Senterpartiet)	3
Socialist Left Party (Sosialistisk Venstreparti)	1
Liberal Party (Venstre)	1
Melbu Area Cooperative List (Melbu og omegn samarbeidsliste)	1
Total number of members:	25

Hadsel kommunestyre 2011–2015
Party name (in Norwegian)	Number of representatives
Labour Party (Arbeiderpartiet)	5
Progress Party (Fremskrittspartiet)	9
Conservative Party (Høyre)	3
Christian Democratic Party (Kristelig Folkeparti)	1
Centre Party (Senterpartiet)	1
Socialist Left Party (Sosialistisk Venstreparti)	1
Liberal Party (Venstre)	1
Hadsel Common List (Hadsel Fellesliste)	3
Melbu Area Cooperative List (Melbu og omegn samarbeidsliste)	1
Total number of members:	25

Hadsel kommunestyre 2007–2011
Party name (in Norwegian)	Number of representatives
Labour Party (Arbeiderpartiet)	7
Progress Party (Fremskrittspartiet)	4
Conservative Party (Høyre)	2
Christian Democratic Party (Kristelig Folkeparti)	1
Centre Party (Senterpartiet)	3
Socialist Left Party (Sosialistisk Venstreparti)	1
Liberal Party (Venstre)	1
Hadsel common list (Hadsel fellesliste)	6
Total number of members:	25

Hadsel kommunestyre 2003–2007
Party name (in Norwegian)	Number of representatives
Labour Party (Arbeiderpartiet)	11
Progress Party (Fremskrittspartiet)	5
Conservative Party (Høyre)	3
Christian Democratic Party (Kristelig Folkeparti)	2
Pensioners' Party (Pensjonistpartiet)	1
Centre Party (Senterpartiet)	4
Socialist Left Party (Sosialistisk Venstreparti)	4
Hadsel common list (Hadsel Fellesliste)	7
Total number of members:	37

Hadsel kommunestyre 1999–2003
Party name (in Norwegian)	Number of representatives
Labour Party (Arbeiderpartiet)	17
Progress Party (Fremskrittspartiet)	4
Conservative Party (Høyre)	4
Christian Democratic Party (Kristelig Folkeparti)	3
Pensioners' Party (Pensjonistpartiet)	1
Centre Party (Senterpartiet)	4
Socialist Left Party (Sosialistisk Venstreparti)	3
Liberal Party (Venstre)	1
Total number of members:	37

Hadsel kommunestyre 1995–1999
Party name (in Norwegian)	Number of representatives
Labour Party (Arbeiderpartiet)	13
Progress Party (Fremskrittspartiet)	3
Conservative Party (Høyre)	5
Christian Democratic Party (Kristelig Folkeparti)	2
Pensioners' Party (Pensjonistpartiet)	1
Centre Party (Senterpartiet)	7
Socialist Left Party (Sosialistisk Venstreparti)	4
Liberal Party (Venstre)	2
Total number of members:	37

Hadsel kommunestyre 1991–1995
Party name (in Norwegian)	Number of representatives
Labour Party (Arbeiderpartiet)	14
Progress Party (Fremskrittspartiet)	1
Conservative Party (Høyre)	7
Christian Democratic Party (Kristelig Folkeparti)	2
Centre Party (Senterpartiet)	6
Socialist Left Party (Sosialistisk Venstreparti)	6
Liberal Party (Venstre)	1
Total number of members:	37

Hadsel kommunestyre 1987–1991
Party name (in Norwegian)	Number of representatives
Labour Party (Arbeiderpartiet)	13
Progress Party (Fremskrittspartiet)	3
Conservative Party (Høyre)	8
Christian Democratic Party (Kristelig Folkeparti)	2
Pensioners' Party (Pensjonistpartiet)	1
Centre Party (Senterpartiet)	3
Socialist Left Party (Sosialistisk Venstreparti)	4
Liberal Party (Venstre)	3
Total number of members:	37

Hadsel kommunestyre 1983–1987
Party name (in Norwegian)	Number of representatives
Labour Party (Arbeiderpartiet)	15
Conservative Party (Høyre)	9
Christian Democratic Party (Kristelig Folkeparti)	5
Centre Party (Senterpartiet)	2
Socialist Left Party (Sosialistisk Venstreparti)	3
Liberal Party (Venstre)	3
Total number of members:	37

Hadsel kommunestyre 1979–1983
Party name (in Norwegian)	Number of representatives
Labour Party (Arbeiderpartiet)	14
Conservative Party (Høyre)	9
Christian Democratic Party (Kristelig Folkeparti)	4
Centre Party (Senterpartiet)	3
Socialist Left Party (Sosialistisk Venstreparti)	2
Liberal Party (Venstre)	3
Melbu area non-party list (Melbu og Omegn upolitiske liste)	2
Total number of members:	37

Hadsel kommunestyre 1975–1979
Party name (in Norwegian)	Number of representatives
Labour Party (Arbeiderpartiet)	15
Conservative Party (Høyre)	5
Christian Democratic Party (Kristelig Folkeparti)	5
Centre Party (Senterpartiet)	5
Socialist Left Party (Sosialistisk Venstreparti)	3
Liberal Party (Venstre)	3
Common List Innlandet and Indre Stranland (Fellesliste Innlandet og Indre Stranland)	1
Total number of members:	37

Hadsel kommunestyre 1971–1975
Party name (in Norwegian)	Number of representatives
Labour Party (Arbeiderpartiet)	17
Conservative Party (Høyre)	4
Christian Democratic Party (Kristelig Folkeparti)	5
Centre Party (Senterpartiet)	5
Socialist People's Party (Sosialistisk Folkeparti)	3
Liberal Party (Venstre)	3
Total number of members:	37

Hadsel kommunestyre 1967–1971
Party name (in Norwegian)	Number of representatives
Labour Party (Arbeiderpartiet)	20
Conservative Party (Høyre)	4
Christian Democratic Party (Kristelig Folkeparti)	5
Centre Party (Senterpartiet)	3
Socialist People's Party (Sosialistisk Folkeparti)	2
Liberal Party (Venstre)	3
Total number of members:	37

Hadsel kommunestyre 1963–1967
Party name (in Norwegian)	Number of representatives
Labour Party (Arbeiderpartiet)	16
Conservative Party (Høyre)	5
Communist Party (Kommunistiske Parti)	1
Christian Democratic Party (Kristelig Folkeparti)	5
Centre Party (Senterpartiet)	3
Socialist People's Party (Sosialistisk Folkeparti)	2
List of workers, fishermen, and small farmholders (Arbeidere, fiskere, småbrukere liste)	2
Local List(s) (Lokale lister)	3
Total number of members:	37

Hadsel herredsstyre 1959–1963
Party name (in Norwegian)	Number of representatives
Labour Party (Arbeiderpartiet)	17
Conservative Party (Høyre)	5
Communist Party (Kommunistiske Parti)	1
Christian Democratic Party (Kristelig Folkeparti)	6
Centre Party (Senterpartiet)	4
Local List(s) (Lokale lister)	8
Total number of members:	41

Hadsel herredsstyre 1955–1959
Party name (in Norwegian)	Number of representatives
Labour Party (Arbeiderpartiet)	25
Communist Party (Kommunistiske Parti)	2
Joint List(s) of Non-Socialist Parties (Borgerlige Felleslister)	11
Local List(s) (Lokale lister)	3
Total number of members:	41

Hadsel herredsstyre 1951–1955
Party name (in Norwegian)	Number of representatives
Labour Party (Arbeiderpartiet)	18
Communist Party (Kommunistiske Parti)	3
Joint List(s) of Non-Socialist Parties (Borgerlige Felleslister)	13
Local List(s) (Lokale lister)	2
Total number of members:	36

Hadsel herredsstyre 1947–1951
Party name (in Norwegian)	Number of representatives
Labour Party (Arbeiderpartiet)	19
Communist Party (Kommunistiske Parti)	3
Joint List(s) of Non-Socialist Parties (Borgerlige Felleslister)	12
Local List(s) (Lokale lister)	2
Total number of members:	36

Hadsel herredsstyre 1945–1947
Party name (in Norwegian)	Number of representatives
Labour Party (Arbeiderpartiet)	18
Communist Party (Kommunistiske Parti)	3
List of workers, fishermen, and small farmholders (Arbeidere, fiskere, småbrukere liste)	6
Joint List(s) of Non-Socialist Parties (Borgerlige Felleslister)	3
Local List(s) (Lokale lister)	6
Total number of members:	36

Hadsel herredsstyre 1937–1941*
Party name (in Norwegian)	Number of representatives
Labour Party (Arbeiderpartiet)	17
Communist Party (Kommunistiske Parti)	1
List of workers, fishermen, and small farmholders (Arbeidere, fiskere, småbrukere liste)	6
Joint List(s) of Non-Socialist Parties (Borgerlige Felleslister)	10
Local List(s) (Lokale lister)	2
Total number of members:	36
Note: Due to the German occupation of Norway during World War II, no elections were held for new municipal councils until after the war ended in 1945.

=== Mayors ===
The mayor (Norwegian: ordfører) of Hadsel Municipality is the political leader of the municipality and the chairperson of the municipal council. Here is a list of people who have held this position:

- 1838–1840: Erich Leganger Coldevin
- 1840–1842: Villatz Bing Dreyer
- 1842–1847: Johan Bjerch
- 1847–1847: Erich Leganger Coldevin
- 1847–1848: Mons Krey
- 1848–1850: Lars Olai Næss
- 1850–1852: Nikolai Castus Berner
- 1852–1852: Lars Olai Næss
- 1852–1865: Jørgen Meldal Arentz
- 1865–1867: Wilhelm Dahl Hals
- 1867–1869: Martin Bertzius Heggelund
- 1870–1872: Wilhelm Dahl Hals
- 1873–1874: Martin Bertzius Heggelund
- 1875–1880: Sofus Anton Birger Arctander
- 1881–1882: Jens O. Dahl
- 1883–1884: Ditlef Efraim Jæger
- 1885–1898: Martin Larsen Hennes
- 1898–1902: Daniel Baltzazar Kildal
- 1903–1905: Kristian August Fosse
- 1905–1914: Johan Jakobsen Hanøy
- 1914–1919: Johan Johnsen Skagen
- 1919–1928: Knut Larsen Leknes (V)
- 1928–1934: Håvard Nikolai Hanssen (Bp)
- 1934–1937: Olaus Fjellstad (Ap)
- 1941–1942: Mr. Nøstvik (NS)
- 1942–1945: Olav Dahl (NS)
- 1946–1959: Olaus Fjellstad (Ap)
- 1959–1967: Edmund Fjærvoll (KrF)
- 1968–1971: Bjarne Bendiksen (Ap)
- 1972–1972: Egil Karlsen (V)
- 1972–1973: Trygve Pettersen (Ap)
- 1974–1975: Elnar Bårdsen (Ap)
- 1975–1979: John Kristiansen (H)
- 1979–1985: Dag Jostein Fjærvoll (KrF)
- 1985–1987: Ingegjerd Solum (Ap)
- 1987–1999: Hugo Olsen (Ap)
- 1999–2003: Ørjan Robertsen (Ap)
- 2003–2007: Reidar Johnsen (Sp)
- 2007–2015: Kjell-Børge Freiberg (FrP)
- 2015–2019: Siv Dagny Aasvik (Ap)
- 2019–2020: Kurt Eirik Jenssen (Sp)
- 2020–2023: Aina Johanne Nilsen (Sp)
- 2023–present: Kjell-Børge Freiberg (H)

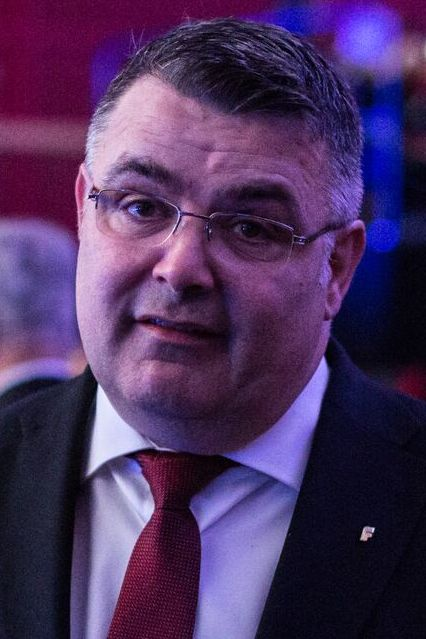
Kjell-Børge Freiberg, 2019

== Notable people ==
- Øyvinn Øi (1901 in Hadsel – 1940), a Norwegian military officer killed at the outbreak of WWII
- Asbjørn Herteig (1919 in Hadsel – 2006), an archeologist who was the first curator at the Bryggen Museum
- Maren-Sofie Røstvig (1920 in Melbu – 2014), a literary historian
- Henry Valen (1924 in Hadsel – 2007), a political scientist and academic
- Lars Andreas Larssen (1935 in Melbu – 2014), a stage, film, and television actor
- Oddbjørn Knutsen (1953 in Hadsel – 2019), a political scientist and academic
- Kjell-Børge Freiberg (born 1971 In Hadsel), a Norwegian politician, government minister, and mayor of Hadsel from 2007 to 2015
