= Hadseløya =

Island in Nordland, Norway

Hadseløya (Norwegian); Ulbi (Northern Sami)
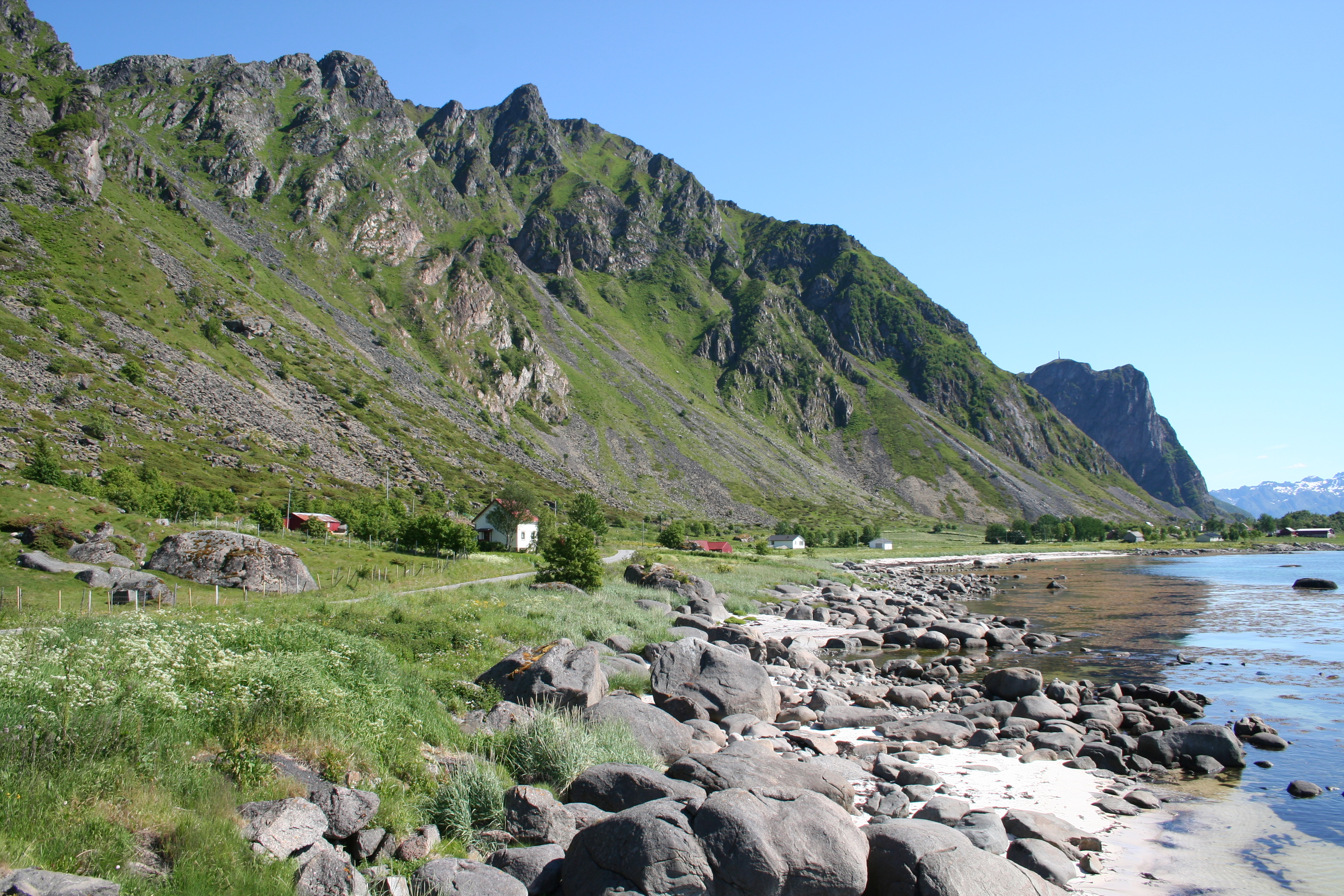
- Interactive map of: Hadseløya (Norwegian); Ulbi (Northern Sami)

Geography
- Location: Nordland, Norway
- Coordinates: 68.5455°N 14.7009°E
- Archipelago: Vesterålen
- Area: 102 km^{2} (39 sq mi)
- Length: 16 km (9.9 mi)
- Width: 10 km (6 mi)
- Highest elevation: 657 m (2156 ft)
- Highest point: Lamlitinden

Administration
- Norway
- County: Nordland
- Municipality: Hadsel Municipality

Hadseløya (Norwegian) or Ulbi (Northern Sami) is an island in Hadsel Municipality in Nordland county, Norway. It is located in the Vesterålen region on the north side of the Hadselfjorden. The town of Stokmarknes is situated on the northern shore of the island and the village of Melbu is on the southern coast.

The island has an area of 102 square kilometres (39 sq mi). The 657-metre (2,156 ft) tall mountain Lamlitinden is the highest point on the island. Hadseløya is connected to the neighboring islands of Langøya and Børøya by the Hadsel Bridge. There is also a ferry connection from the village of Melbu to the village of Fiskebøl on Austvågøya island to the south.

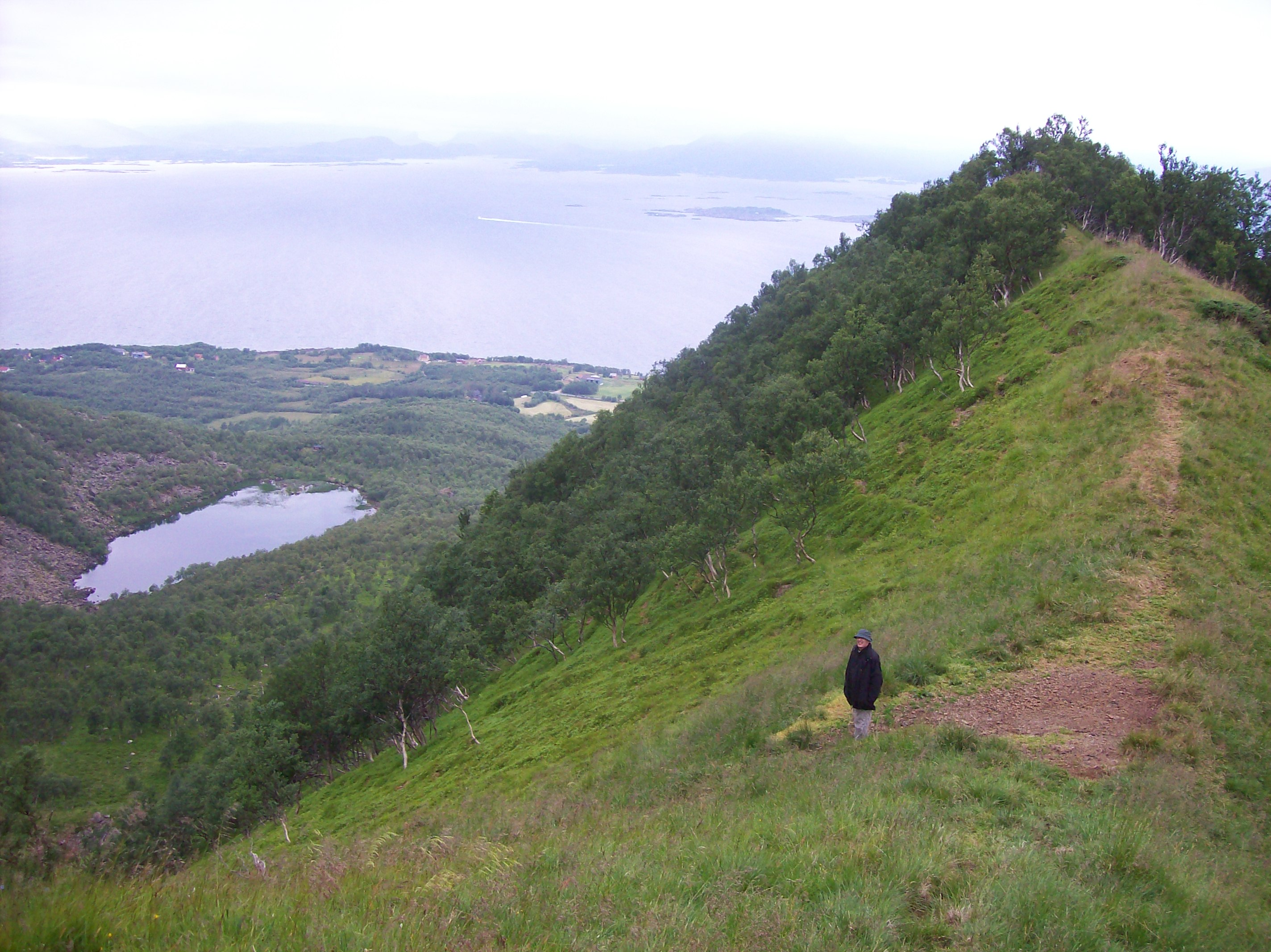
View from mountain on Hadseløya

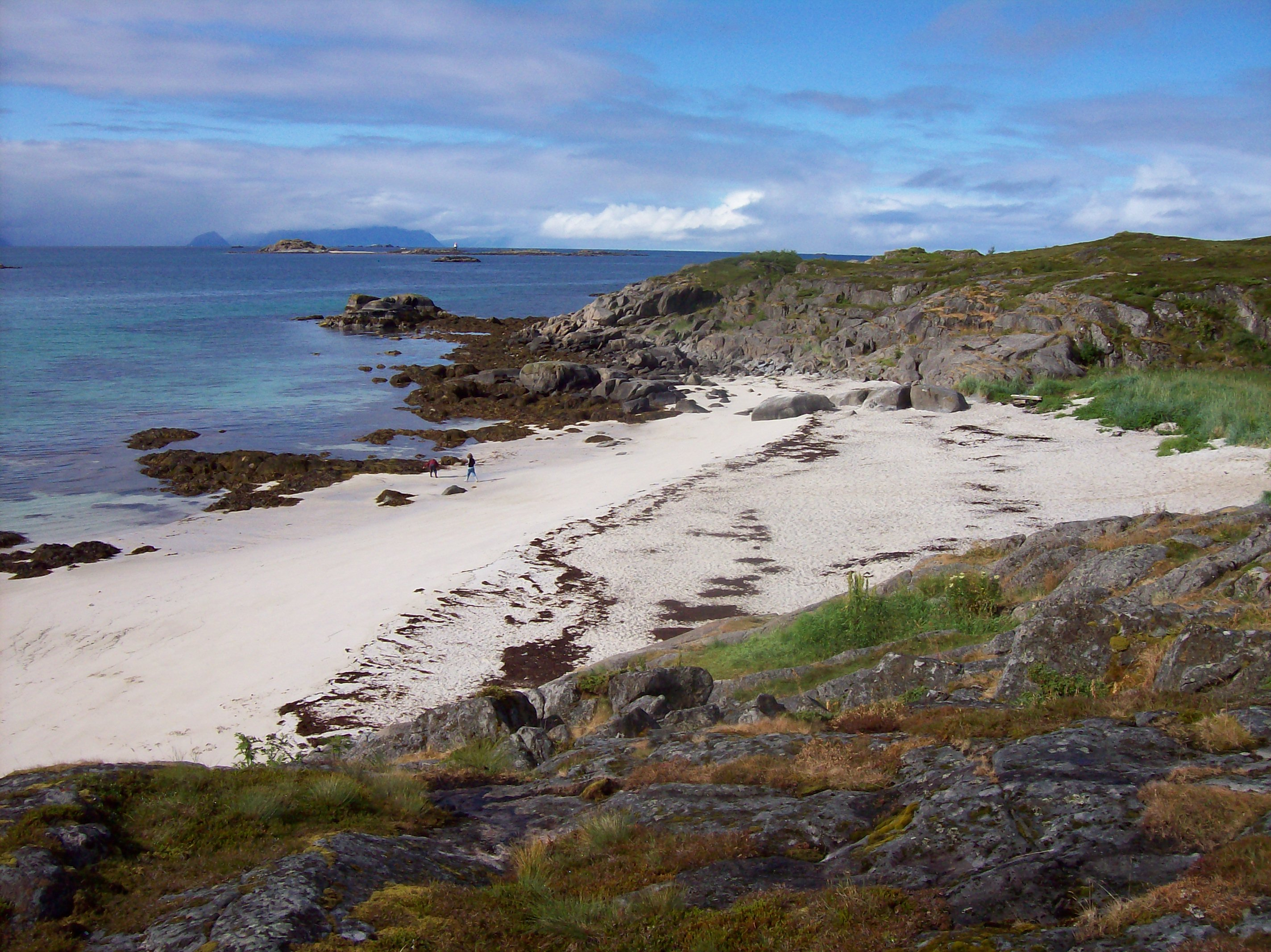
Taen beach on Hadseløya

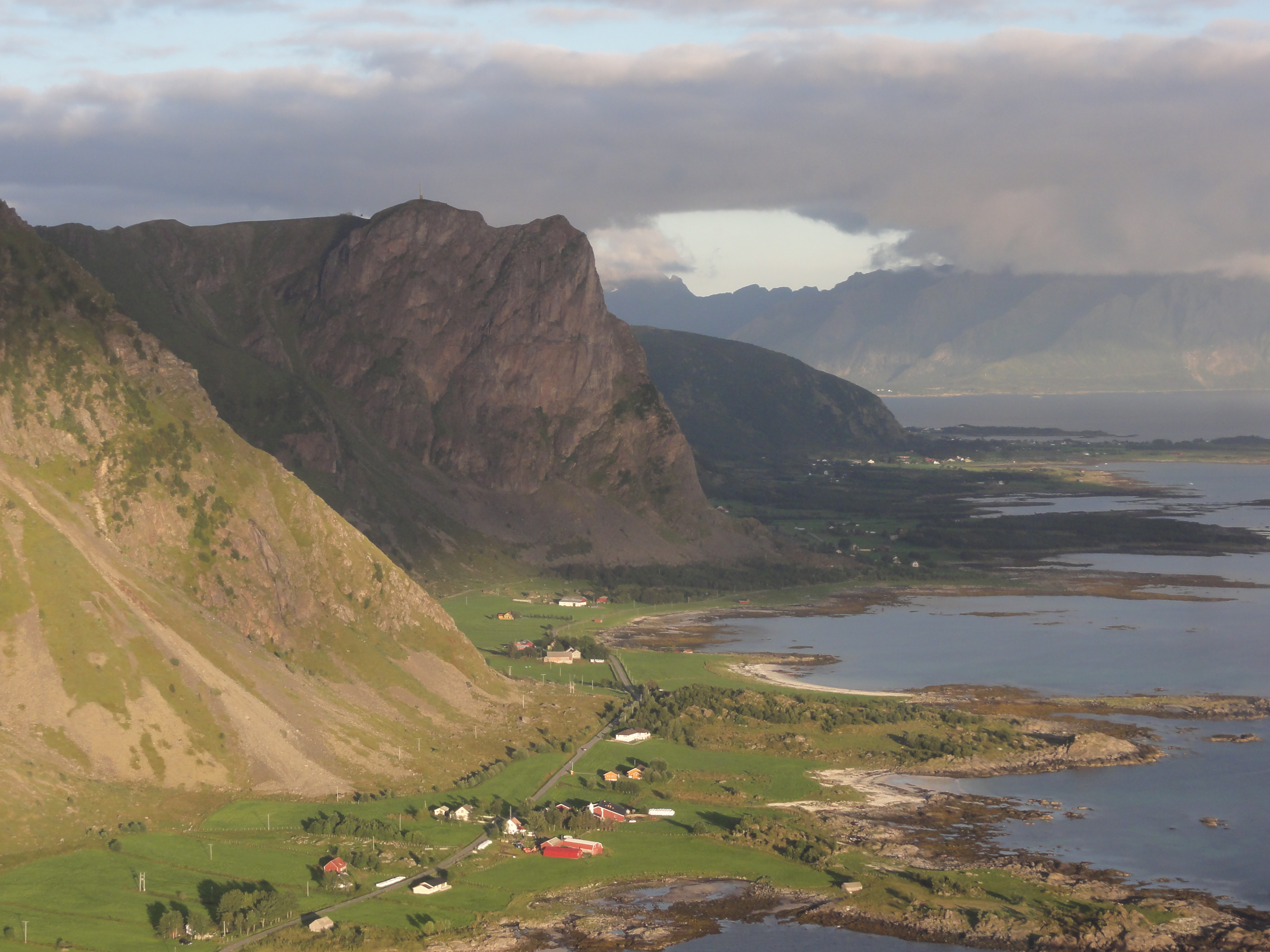
Aerial view of the western coast of the island

== See also ==
- List of islands of Norway
