= Petter Carl Reinsnes =

Norwegian politician

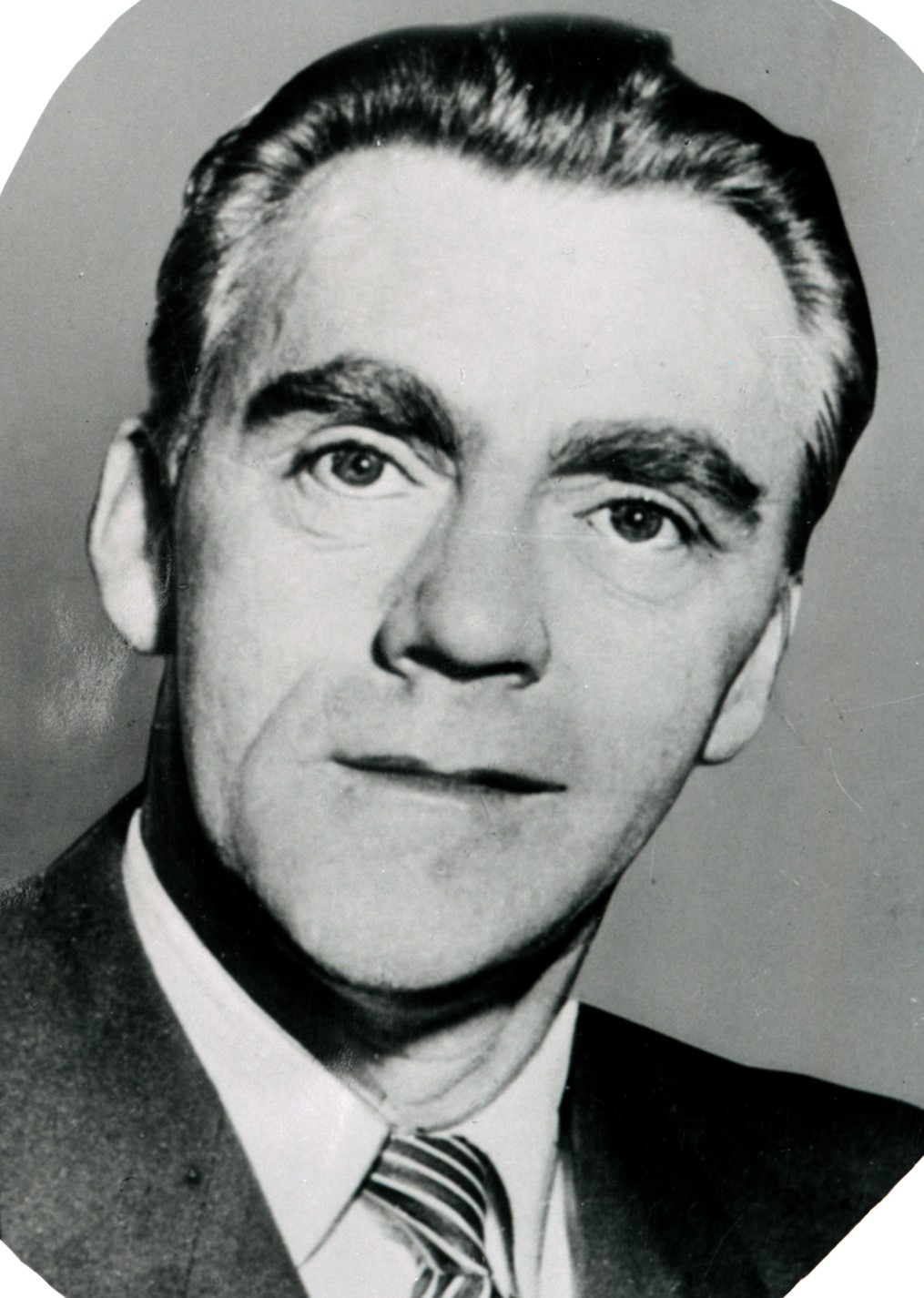
Petter Carl Reinsnes

Petter Carl Reinsnes (usually called P.C. Reinsnes; 4 October 1904 – 12 March 1976) was a Norwegian politician (Norwegian Labour Party), mayor of the Sortland Municipality, county mayor of Nordland, and a member of the Storting.

Petter Ovald Karlsen (later Petter Carl Reinsnes) was born in the Reinsnes district of Sortland Municipality. He was elected to the municipal council for Sortland Municipality in the fall of 1931, and became mayor there in 1935. He was removed from office by the Nazis in 1941, during the German occupation of Norway, and in 1944 he was forced to escape to Sweden.

When the war was over, he returned to Sortland Municipality, and worked as mayor there until 1959. His party, the Norwegian Labour Party, lost the municipal election in 1959, and Reinsnes consequently lost his position as mayor. Reinsnes retained his position on the municipal council. After the election in 1963, he was chosen to become the mayor again, and kept this position until 1975. He was also chairman of Nordland county council from 1945 to 1960, deputy county mayor from 1966 to 1970 and county mayor of Nordland in 1971.

From 1954–1957 Reinsnes served as a deputy representative to the Parliament of Norway. He was then voted into Parliament in 1957 and remained there for two periods (eight years). During both terms, Reinsnes was a member of the Standing Committee on Foreign and Constitutional Affairs and the Enlarged Committee on Foreign and Constitutional Affairs. He campaigned for the construction of an agriculture school in Vesterålen, and he was a chairman for Vesterålens power group from the start in 1939 until his death in 1976.

In the 1960s, he took the initiative to connect the islands in Vesterålen by a bridge. The Andøy and Kvalsaukan Bridges were opened in 1974, and Sortland Bridge was opened in 1975. Hadsel Bridge was opened in 1978, after his death. He was a chairman in Vesterålsbruene A/S from 1970 until his death. Reinsnes was also engaged in work to obtain an airport for Vesterålen. Stokmarknes Airport was opened in 1972.

Reinsnes was awarded th King's Medal of Merit in gold a short time before his death. He died 12 March 1976 of cancer.

On 26 August 1978, a bust of Reinsnes, made by Nils Aas, was unveiled outside the Sortland Municipality municipal hall, the same day that the Vesterålen bridges were officially opened by King Olav V.

He was biographed in P. C. Reinsnes - samfunnsbyggeren, by Alf Oxem 2006. ISBN 978-82-991889-2-0
