= Strand, Nordland =

Village in Sortland Municipality, Norway

Strand
- Village
- Interactive map of Strand
- Location within Nordland Location within Norway
- Coordinates: 68.6972°N 15.4495°E
- Country: Norway
- Region: Northern Norway
- County: Nordland
- District: Vesterålen
- Municipality: Sortland Municipality

Area
  - Total: 0.47 km^{2} (0.18 sq mi)
- Elevation: 6 m (20 ft)

Population (2023)
  - Total: 781
  - Density: 1,662/km^{2} (4,300/sq mi)
- Time zone: UTC+01:00 (CET)
  - Summer (DST): UTC+02:00 (CEST)
- Post Code: 8400 Sortland

Strand is a village in Sortland Municipality in Nordland county, Norway. The village is located on the island of Hinnøya at the eastern end of the Sortland Bridge which crosses the Sortlandsundet strait and connects to the town of Sortland on Langøya island. It is located about 5 kilometres (3.1 mi) north of the village of Sigerfjord.

The 0.47-square-kilometre (120-acre) village has a population (2023) of 781 which gives the village a population density of 1,662 inhabitants per square kilometre (4,300/sq mi).
