= Holand, Sortland =

Village in Sortland Municipality, Norway

Holand
- Village
- Interactive map of Holand
- Location within Nordland Location within Norway
- Coordinates: 68.6425°N 15.2686°E
- Country: Norway
- Region: Northern Norway
- County: Nordland
- District: Vesterålen
- Municipality: Sortland Municipality
- Elevation: 13 m (43 ft)
- Time zone: UTC+01:00 (CET)
  - Summer (DST): UTC+02:00 (CEST)
- Post Code: 8404 Sortland

Holand is a village in Sortland Municipality in Nordland county, Norway. The village is located on the island of Langøya along the Sortlandssundet strait, about 10 kilometres (6.2 mi) southwest of the town of Sortland and about 4 kilometres (2.5 mi) southwest of the village of Bø.
