= Bø, Sortland =

Village in Sortland Municipality, Norway

Bø
- Village
- Interactive map of Bø
- Location within Nordland Location within Norway
- Coordinates: 68.6561°N 15.3193°E
- Country: Norway
- Region: Northern Norway
- County: Nordland
- District: Vesterålen
- Municipality: Sortland Municipality
- Elevation: 17 m (56 ft)
- Time zone: UTC+01:00 (CET)
  - Summer (DST): UTC+02:00 (CEST)
- Post Code: 8400 Sortland

Bø is a village in Sortland Municipality in Nordland county, Norway. The village is located on the island of Langøya along the Sortlandssundet strait, about 6 kilometres (3.7 mi) southwest of the town of Sortland and about 4 kilometres (2.5 mi) northeast of the village of Holand.
