= Liland, Sortland =

Village in Sortland Municipality, Norway

Liland, Sortland: Liland (Norwegian); Lidaláddi (Northern Sami)
- Village
- Interactive map of Liland, Sortland
- Location within Nordland Location within Norway
- Coordinates: 68.7457°N 15.5050°E
- Country: Norway
- Region: Northern Norway
- County: Nordland
- District: Vesterålen
- Municipality: Sortland Municipality
- Elevation: 11 m (36 ft)
- Time zone: UTC+01:00 (CET)
  - Summer (DST): UTC+02:00 (CEST)
- Post Code: 8407 Sortland

Liland (Norwegian) or Lidaláddi (Northern Sami) is a village located in the Sortland Municipality of Nordland county, Norway. The village is located on the island of Hinnøya along the Sortlandssundet strait, about 10 kilometres (6.2 mi) northeast of the town of Sortland, and just north of the Kvalsaukan Bridge.
