= Risøysundet =

Strait in Nordland, Norway

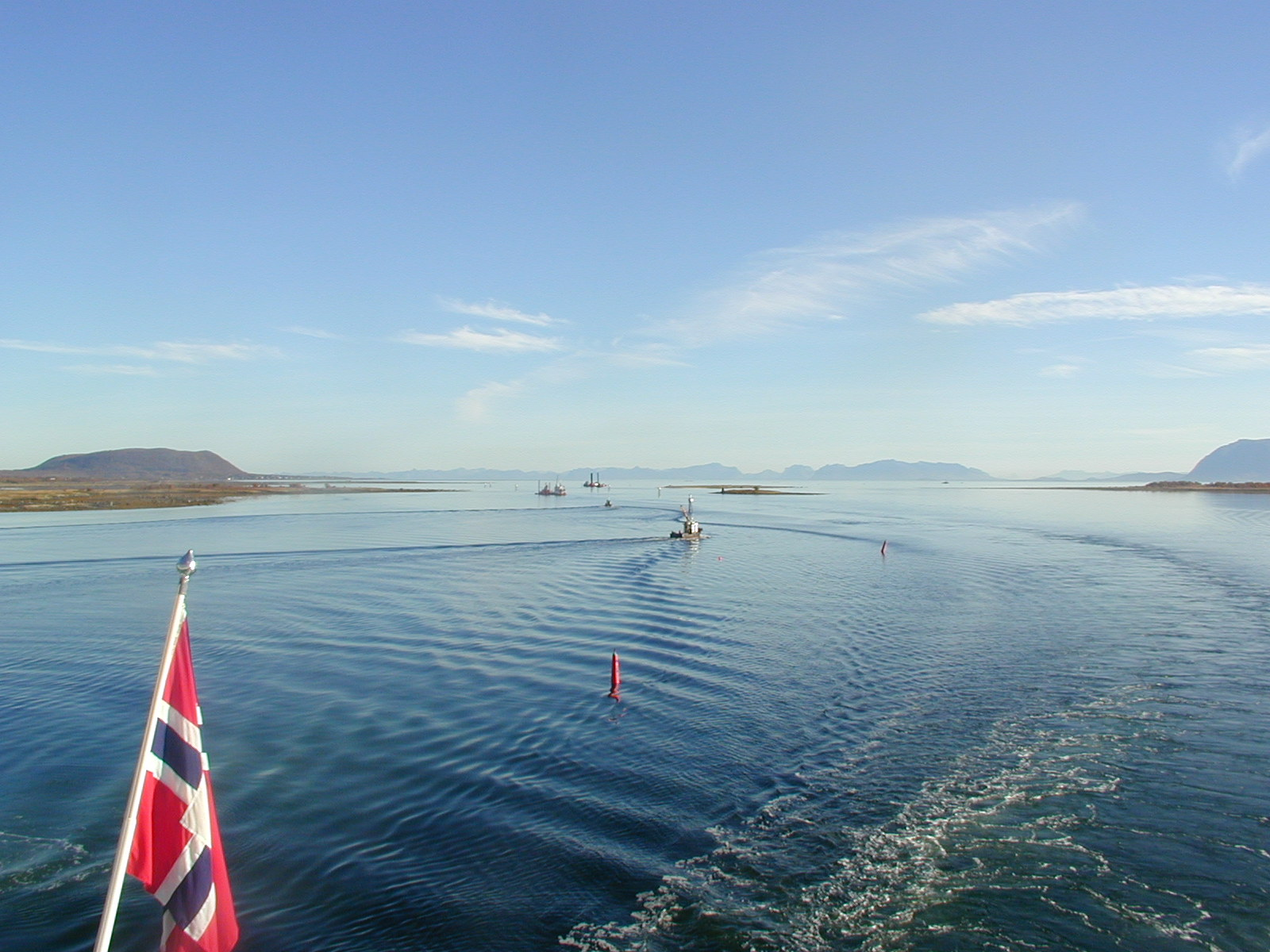
- View of the fjord
- Interactive map of the fjord
- Location: Nordland county, Norway
- Coordinates: 68.9199°N 15.5912°E
- Type: Fjord
- Basin countries: Norway
- Max. length: 24 kilometres (15 mi)
- Max. width: 6 kilometres (3.7 mi)
- Settlements: Risøyhamn

Ramsar Wetland
- Designated: 27 May 2013
- Reference no.: 2163

Risøysundet is a strait between the islands of Andøya and Hinnøya in the Vesterålen archipelago in Norway. It is located in Andøy Municipality in Nordland county. The 24-kilometre (15 mi) long strait has only one road crossing: the Andøy Bridge as part of the Norwegian County Road 82 connecting the villages of Risøyhamn and Dragnes.

The strait flows between the Gavlfjorden/Sortlandssundet in the southwest and the Andfjorden in the northeast. The northeastern end of the strait is naturally very shallow and in low tide the sand bars can be above water. In the 1870s work began to dredge a channel through the strait to allow larger boats to pass. In 1922, a 4.5 kilometres (2.8 mi) long channel was completed, enabling the Hurtigruten to pass through the strait.
