= Liland =

Liland may refer to

== Places ==
=== Norway ===
- Liland, Bergen, a village in Bergen municipality, Hordaland county
- Liland, Evenes, a village in Evenes municipality, Nordland county
- Liland, Sortland, a village in Sortland municipality, Nordland county
- Liland, Troms, a village in Nordreisa municipality, Troms county
- Liland, Vestvågøy, a village in Vestvågøy municipality, Nordland county
- Liland, Vågan, a village in Vågan municipality, Nordland county

== People ==
- Asbjørn Liland, a Norwegian politician
- Hanne Liland, a retired racewalker from Norway

== Other ==
- Liland Affair, a famous Norwegian murder trial
