= Sigerfjord =

Village in Sortland Municipality, Norway

- Village
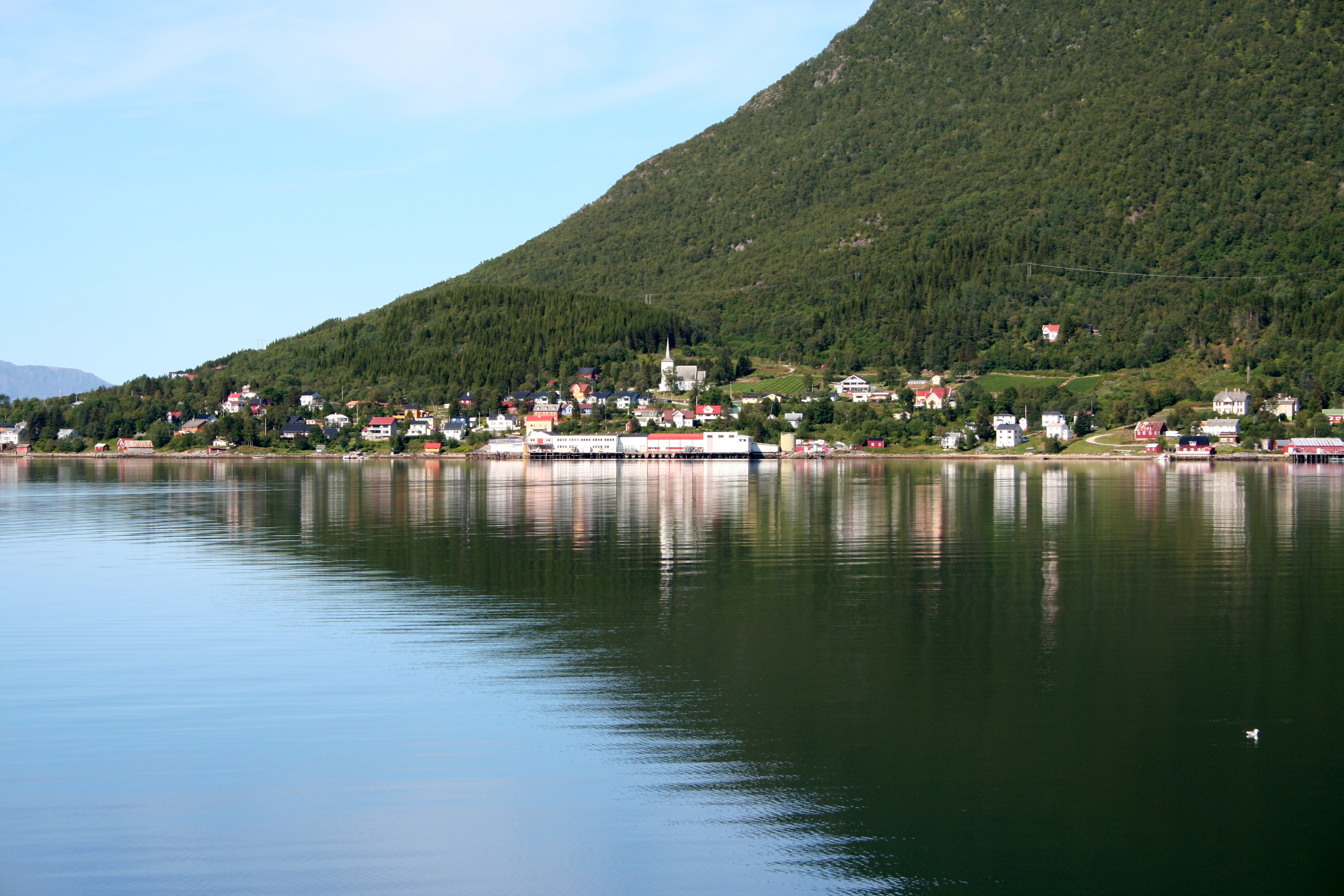
- View of the village
- Interactive map of Sigerfjord
- Location within Nordland Location within Norway
- Coordinates: 68.6437°N 15.5116°E
- Country: Norway
- Region: Northern Norway
- County: Nordland
- District: Vesterålen
- Municipality: Sortland Municipality

Area
  - Total: 0.77 km^{2} (0.30 sq mi)
- Elevation: 12 m (39 ft)

Population (2023)
  - Total: 818
  - Density: 1,062/km^{2} (2,750/sq mi)
- Time zone: UTC+01:00 (CET)
  - Summer (DST): UTC+02:00 (CEST)
- Post Code: 8406 Sortland

Sigerfjord is a village in Sortland Municipality in Nordland county, Norway. The village is located on the island of Hinnøya by the entrance to the Sigerfjorden. The village of Strand and the Sortland Bridge are located about 6 kilometres (3.7 mi) to the north. Sigerfjord Church is located in this village.

The 0.77-square-kilometre (190-acre) village has a population (2023) of 818 which gives the village a population density of 1,062 inhabitants per square kilometre (2,750/sq mi).
