= Djupfjordstraumen Bridge =

Djupfjordstraumen Bridge Djupfjordstraumen bru
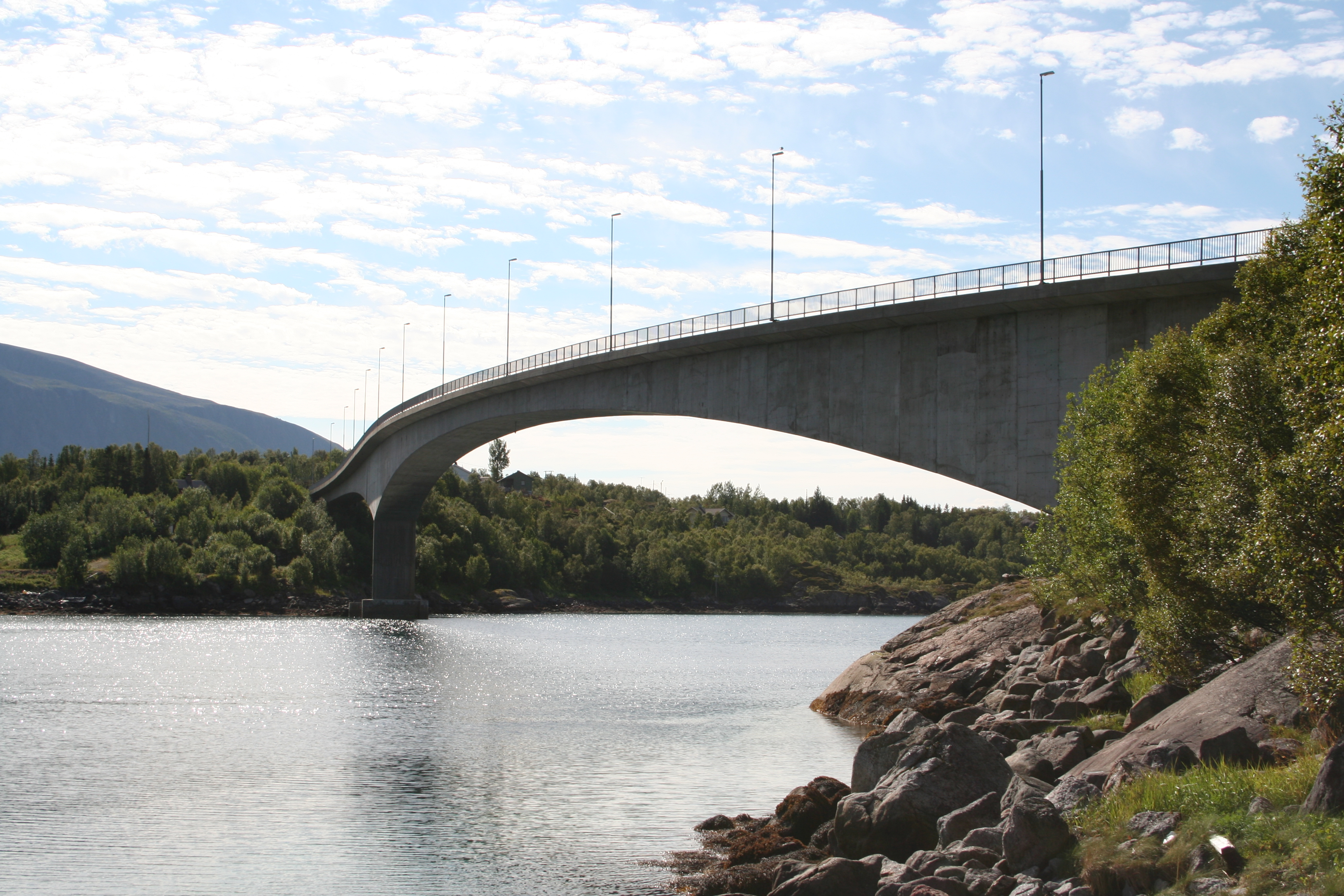
- View of the bridge
- Coordinates: 68°37′13″N 15°25′55″E
- Carries: Fv822
- Crosses: Djupfjorden
- Locale: Sortland Municipality, Norway

Characteristics
- Total length: 346 metres (1,135 ft)
- Longest span: 190 metres (620 ft)

History
- Opened: 1983

The Djupfjordstraumen Bridge (Norwegian: Djupfjordstraumen bru or Djupfjordbrua) is a cantilever road bridge that crosses the Djupfjorden in Sortland Municipality in Nordland county, Norway. The bridge is 346 metres (1,135 ft) long and the main span stretches 190 metres (620 ft). The bridge was opened in 1983. It is located on the west coast of the island of Hinnøya.

== See also ==
- List of bridges in Norway
- List of bridges in Norway by length
- List of bridges
- List of bridges by length
