= Sortland Municipality =

Municipality in Nordland, Norway

Sortland Municipality Sortland kommune Suorttá suohkan
- Municipality
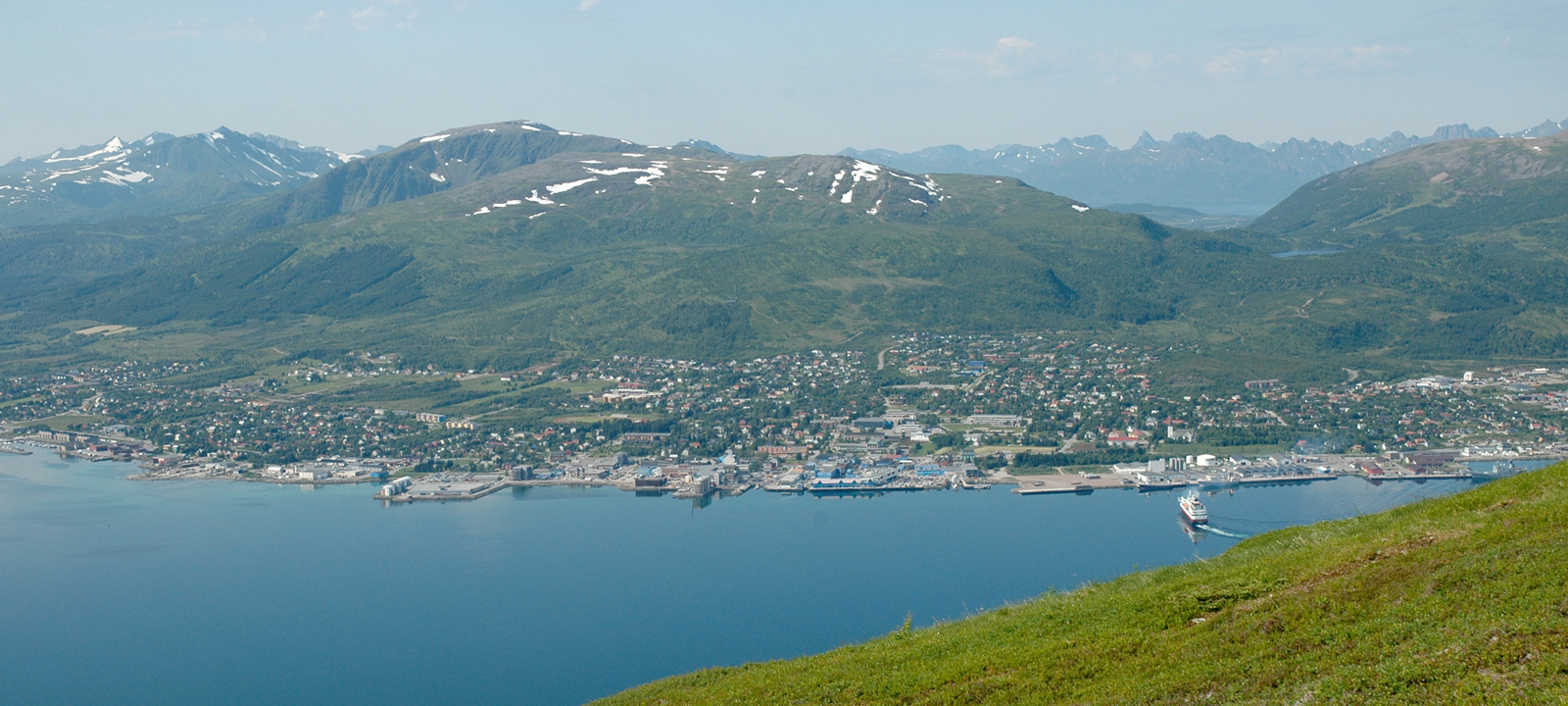
- View of Sortland from Strandheia mountain

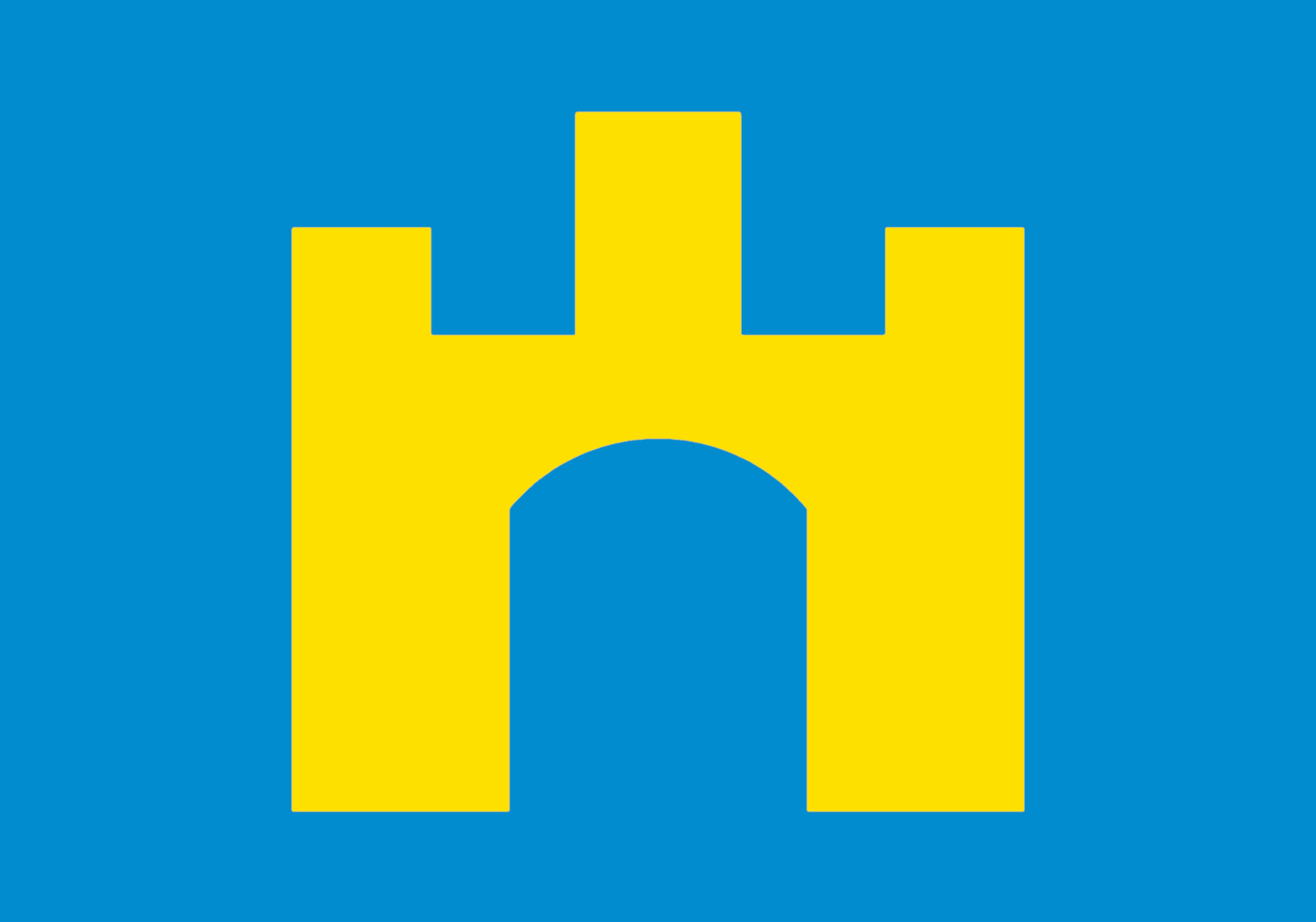
- Flag Coat of arms

- Nordland within Norway

- Sortland within Nordland
- Coordinates: 68°42′31″N 15°16′51″E
- Country: Norway
- County: Nordland
- District: Vesterålen
- Established: 1841
  - Preceded by: Hadsel Municipality
- Administrative centre: Sortland

Government
  - Mayor (2023): Grete Ellingsen (H)

Area
  - Total: 721.94 km^{2} (278.74 sq mi)
  - Land: 697.34 km^{2} (269.24 sq mi)
  - Water: 24.60 km^{2} (9.50 sq mi) 3.4%
  - Rank: #159 in Norway
- Highest elevation: 1,261.76 m (4,139.6 ft)

Population (2024)
  - Total: 10,618
  - Rank: #109 in Norway
  - Density: 14.7/km^{2} (38/sq mi)
  - Change (10 years): ▲ +4.8%
- Demonym: Sortlending

Official language
  - Norwegian form: Neutral
- Time zone: UTC+01:00 (CET)
  - Summer (DST): UTC+02:00 (CEST)
- ISO 3166 code: NO-1870
- Website: Official website

Sortland (Norwegian) or Suortá (Northern Sami) is a municipality in Nordland county, Norway. It is part of the traditional region of Vesterålen. The administrative centre of the municipality is the town of Sortland. Other population centres in Sortland include the villages of Bø, Holand, Holmstad, Liland, Sigerfjord, Strand, and Vik. The Norwegian Coast Guard has its northern base in Sortland, called Kystvaktskvadron Nord.

In 1997, the municipal council declared "town status" for the urban area of Sortland. Sortland is the largest town and commercial centre in Vesterålen. The town of Sortland is located close to the Sortland Bridge which crosses the Sortlandsundet strait and connects the two large islands of Langøya and Hinnøya by road. Since a lot of houses in the town are painted blue, Sortland is sometimes referred to as "the blue city".

The 722-square-kilometre (279 sq mi) municipality is the 159th largest by area out of the 357 municipalities in Norway. Sortland is the 109th most populous municipality in Norway with a population of 10,618. The municipality's population density is 14.7 inhabitants per square kilometre (38/sq mi) and its population has increased by 4.8% over the previous 10-year period. In January 2012, the number of citizens in Sortland reached 10,000 for the first time.

== General information ==
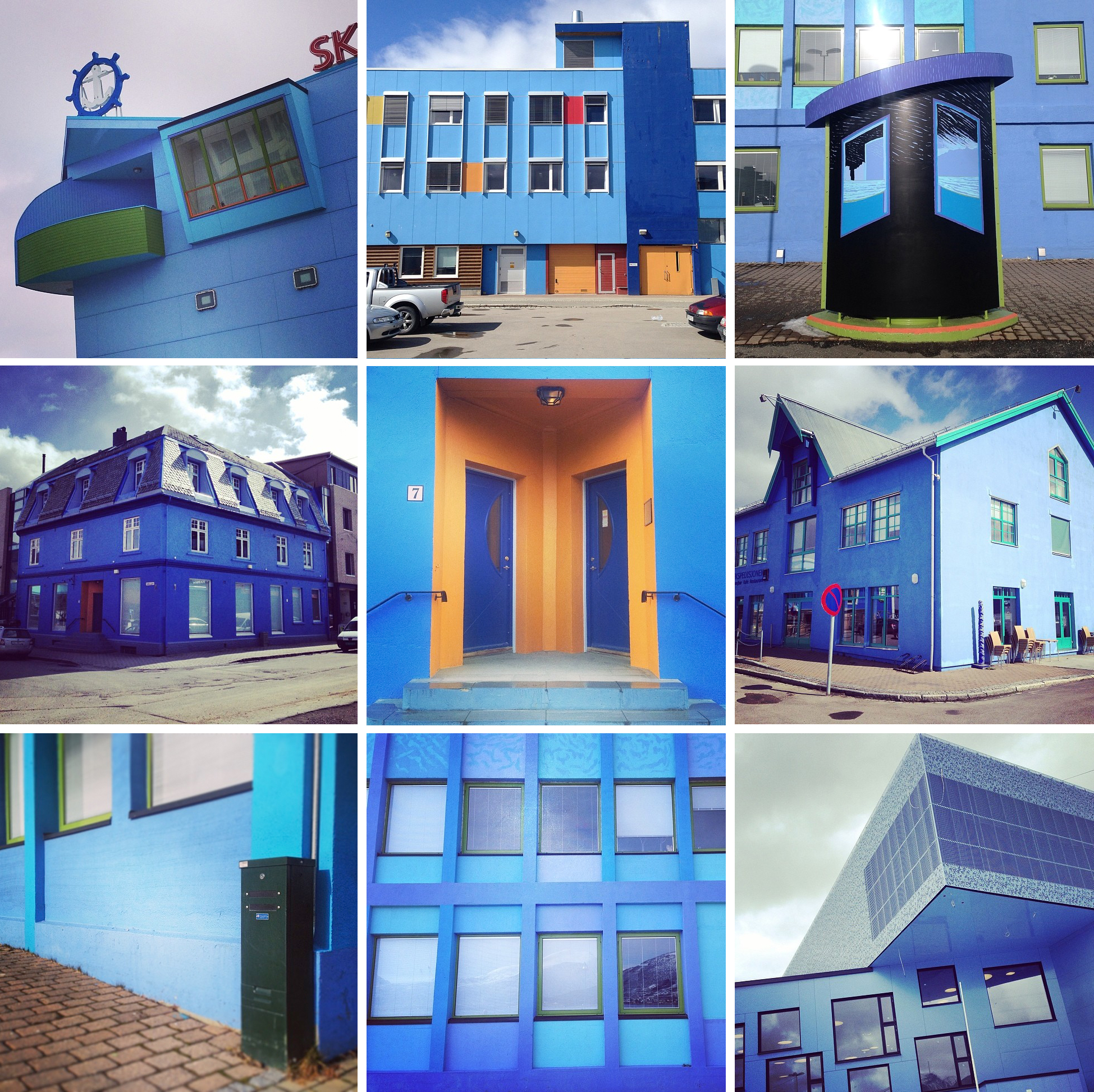
The "blue city" of Sortland.

The municipality of Sortland was established in 1841 when it was separated from the large Hadsel Municipality.

During the 1960s, there were many municipal mergers across Norway due to the work of the Schei Committee. On 1 January 1963, the Holm area (population: 65) along the Gavlfjorden was transferred from Langenes Municipality to Sortland Municipality. Also on that date, the area around the inner and western part of the Eidsfjorden (population: 1,360) was transferred from Hadsel Municipality to Sortland Municipality.

On 1 January 2000, the area surrounding the Godfjorden was transferred from Kvæfjord Municipality (and Troms county) to Sortland Municipality (and Nordland county).

=== Name and etymology ===
The municipality (originally the parish) is named after the old Sortland farm (Old Norse: Svortuland) since the first Sortland Church was built there. The first element is Svort which is the genitive case of the local river name Svorta. The river name is derived from svartr which means "black" or "dark". The last element is land which means "land" or "farm".

There are several theories as to the origin of the name, one of the most popular is that it named from the black fertile soil. Some deny that the first element of the name "Sort" is derived from the color black and instead insist on the origin coming from the native Sami place name "Soarta", which is a theory favored by the local historian Johan Borgos. Another theory is that the name came from the viking age, where it is thought to have meant "Land of the black birds" referring to the area people would hunt and catch small black birds like the Common blackbird (Svarttrost). This is a theory proposed by author and newspaper editor Ronny Jarl Jensen who points to Svortland in Bømlo Municipality, Vestland county as having a similar etymology.

On 2 May 2017, the national government approved a resolution to add a co-equal, official Sami language name for the municipality: Suortá. The spelling of the Sami language name changes depending on how it is used. It is called Suortá when it is spelled alone, but it is Suorttá suohkan when using the Sami language equivalent to "Sortland municipality".

=== Coat of arms ===
The coat of arms was granted on 15 March 1985. The official blazon is "Azure, a castle with three towers without crenelation Or" (Norwegian: I blått en gull borg med tre tårn uten krenelering). This means the arms have a blue field (background) and the charge is a castle with a gate and three towers without crenelation. The castle has a tincture of Or which means it is commonly colored yellow, but if it is made out of metal, then gold is used. The blue color in the field symbolizes the importance of sea and the castle is an updated version of an old coat of arms for Sortland. The castle gate symbolizes Sortland as the gateway to the Vesterålen region and that it is the commercial centre of the region as well. The arms were designed by Kurt Myrland.

The old coat of arms was in use from the 1950s until 1985 when the new arms were granted. The arms showed a castle (very similar to the one in the current arms) in a stylized landscape, including waves and sun rays. The arms included a golden border with three black-white-black piles issuing from both flanks of the white castle. Also, there were four red sun rays issuing from behind the castle (four piles issuant from chief and flanks conjoined in heart), and in the base there were waves of red, black, and white. In the white chief inscribed the word "Sortland". A mural crown with four embattlements was on the top.

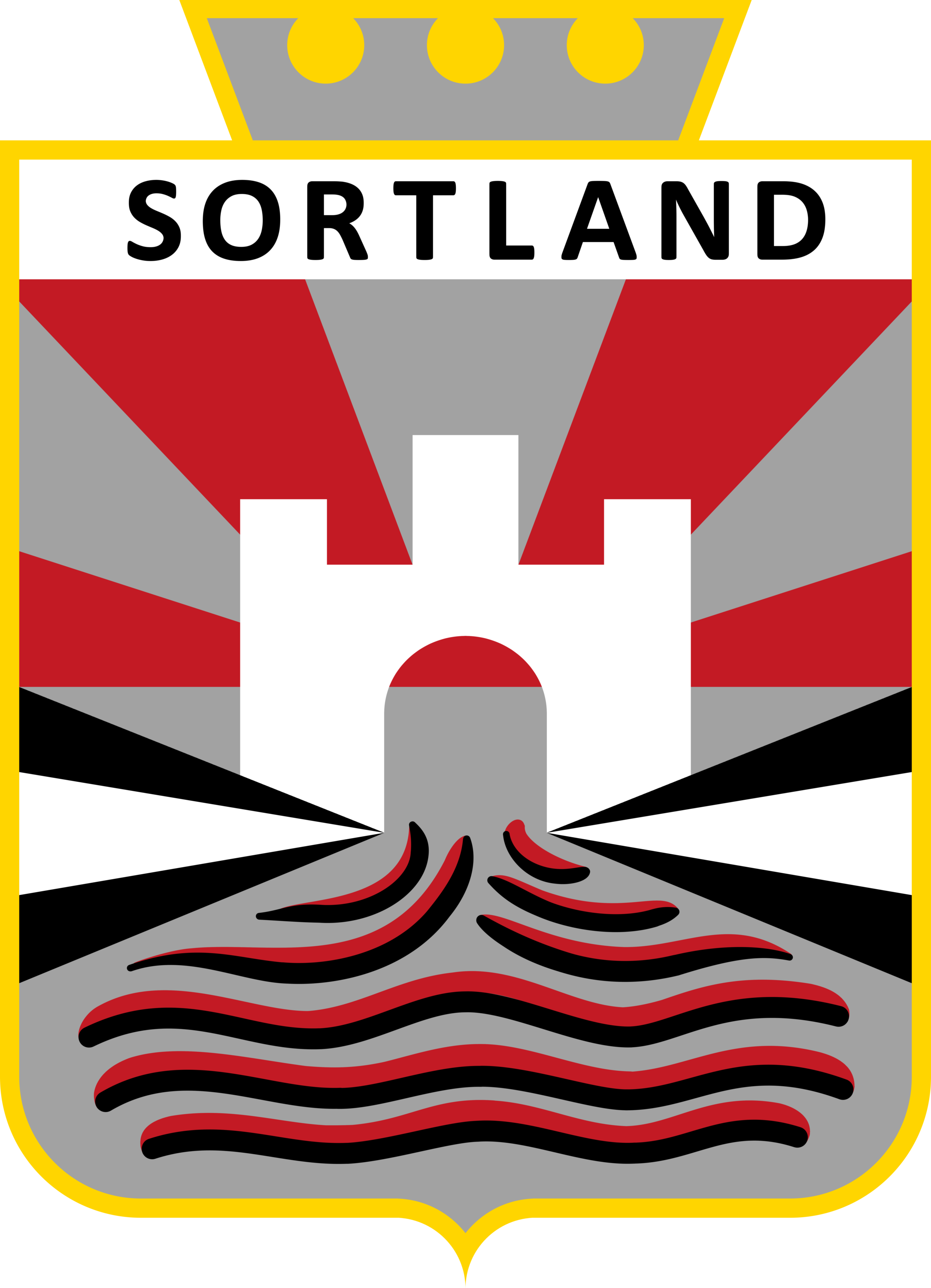
Former coat of arms of Sortland (1950s-1985)

Current arms (since 1985)

=== Churches ===
The Church of Norway has one parish (sokn) within Sortland Municipality. It is part of the Vesterålen prosti (deanery) in the Diocese of Sør-Hålogaland.

Churches in Sortland Municipality
Parish (sokn)	Church name	Location of the church	Year built
Sortland	Indre Eidsfjord Church	Holmstad	1970
Sortland	Sigerfjord Church	Sigerfjord	1933
Sortland	Sortland Church	Sortland	1901

== Geography ==
The municipality of Sortland is located on the islands of Langøya and Hinnøya in the Vesterålen archipelago. The municipality surrounds the inner part of the Eidsfjorden and the Sortlandssundet strait. There are several bridges in the municipality including Djupfjordstraumen Bridge, Kvalsaukan Bridge, and Sortland Bridge. The Sortland Bridge is located just north of the town of Sortland. One of the main roads through the municipality is Norwegian County Road 82. The highest point in the municipality is the 1,261.76-metre (4,139.6 ft) tall mountain Møysalen. Møysalen is located on the southern border with Lødingen Municipality and it is within Møysalen National Park.

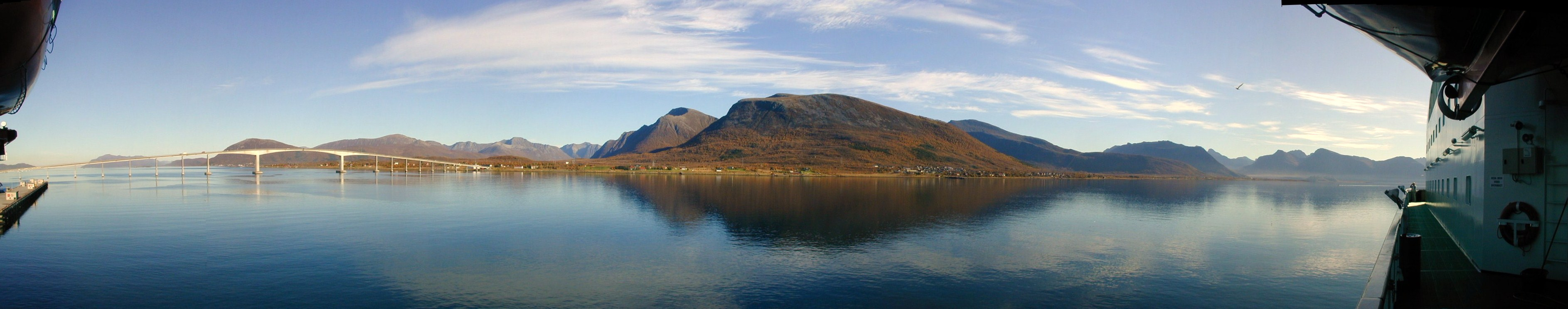
Sortlandsbrua bridge with Strand at Hinnøya island, from Hurtigruten in Sortland

=== Midnight Sun and Aurora Borealis ===
The midnight sun occurs from 23 May to 23 July. Areas to observe the midnight sun includes the Sortland Bridge, Ramnflauget, Godfjorden, Holm, and Skytterhaugen in the Vestmarka residential area. Because of Sortland's high latitude, there is no real darkness between late April and mid-August.

Polar night occurs in Sortland from 30 November to 12 January when the sun remains below the horizon and is not visible at all. The return of the sun is an occasion for celebration in Northern Norway, known as "Soldagen" (lit. 'Day of the sun') which is commonly celebrated with children getting the day off from school. The polar night does not mean that it becomes totally dark, typically daylight is visible for a few hours around noon.

Sortland and the Vesterålen region are known as regions for observing the Aurora Borealis (Northern Lights) phenomenon. Pictures taken here have been presented in National Geographic Magazine.

=== Climate ===
Sortland has a subpolar oceanic climate. The weather station (Sortland-Kleiva) has been recording since January 1956. The record high of 31 °C (88 °F) was set on 29 July 2018. The record low −13.5 °C (7.7 °F) was set in January 2016 (extremes available since 2004). The average date for the last overnight freeze (low below 0 °C (32.0 °F)) in spring is 7 May and average date for first freeze in autumn is 14 October giving a frost-free season of 159 days (1981-2010 average).

Climate data for Sortland 1991–2020 (3 m)
Month	Jan	Feb	Mar	Apr	May	Jun	Jul	Aug	Sep	Oct	Nov	Dec	Year
Mean daily maximum °C (°F)	1.8 (35.2)	1.4 (34.5)	2.5 (36.5)	5.5 (41.9)	9.8 (49.6)	12.6 (54.7)	15.7 (60.3)	15.4 (59.7)	12.1 (53.8)	7.3 (45.1)	4.4 (39.9)	2.7 (36.9)	7.7 (45.9)
Daily mean °C (°F)	−0.8 (30.6)	−1.1 (30.0)	−0.2 (31.6)	2.7 (36.9)	6.6 (43.9)	9.7 (49.5)	12.5 (54.5)	12.3 (54.1)	9.3 (48.7)	5.0 (41.0)	2.1 (35.8)	0.2 (32.4)	4.8 (40.6)
Mean daily minimum °C (°F)	−3.4 (25.9)	−3.7 (25.3)	−2.8 (27.0)	−0.1 (31.8)	3.8 (38.8)	7.4 (45.3)	10.2 (50.4)	9.8 (49.6)	6.8 (44.2)	2.6 (36.7)	−0.4 (31.3)	−2.3 (27.9)	2.4 (36.3)
Average precipitation mm (inches)	152.2 (5.99)	138.6 (5.46)	141.2 (5.56)	88.9 (3.50)	65.6 (2.58)	59.1 (2.33)	62.2 (2.45)	76.4 (3.01)	129.2 (5.09)	168.7 (6.64)	139.9 (5.51)	174.2 (6.86)	1,396.2 (54.97)
Source 1: eklima/Norwegian Meteorological Institute
Source 2: NOAA

Climate data for Sortland - Kleiva 1991–2020 (14 m, extremes 2004–2025)
Month	Jan	Feb	Mar	Apr	May	Jun	Jul	Aug	Sep	Oct	Nov	Dec	Year
Record high °C (°F)	9.7 (49.5)	8.2 (46.8)	9.5 (49.1)	17.6 (63.7)	22.5 (72.5)	29.3 (84.7)	31 (88)	30.8 (87.4)	22.6 (72.7)	18.2 (64.8)	12 (54)	10.1 (50.2)	31 (88)
Daily mean °C (°F)	−0.8 (30.6)	−1.3 (29.7)	−0.3 (31.5)	2.3 (36.1)	6.4 (43.5)	10 (50)	13.1 (55.6)	12.4 (54.3)	9.1 (48.4)	4.6 (40.3)	1.9 (35.4)	0.1 (32.2)	4.8 (40.6)
Record low °C (°F)	−13.5 (7.7)	−11.1 (12.0)	−12.1 (10.2)	−7.3 (18.9)	−4.4 (24.1)	1.1 (34.0)	5.1 (41.2)	3 (37)	−1.2 (29.8)	−3.3 (26.1)	−9.2 (15.4)	−10.1 (13.8)	−13.5 (7.7)
Average precipitation mm (inches)	160 (6.3)	174 (6.9)	150 (5.9)	110 (4.3)	82 (3.2)	78 (3.1)	60 (2.4)	90 (3.5)	116 (4.6)	168 (6.6)	139 (5.5)	171 (6.7)	1,498 (59)
Source: eklima/Norwegian Meteorological Institute

== Government ==
Sortland Municipality is responsible for primary education (through 10th grade), outpatient health services, senior citizen services, welfare and other social services, zoning, economic development, and municipal roads and utilities. The municipality is governed by a municipal council of directly elected representatives. The mayor is indirectly elected by a vote of the municipal council. The municipality is under the jurisdiction of the Midtre Hålogaland District Court and the Hålogaland Court of Appeal.

=== Municipal council ===
The municipal council (Kommunestyre) of Sortland Municipality is made up of 27 representatives that are elected to four year terms. The tables below show the current and historical composition of the council by political party.

Sortland kommunestyre 2023–2027
Party name (in Norwegian)	Number of representatives
Labour Party (Arbeiderpartiet)	4
Progress Party (Fremskrittspartiet)	2
Green Party (Miljøpartiet De Grønne)	1
Conservative Party (Høyre)	12
Industry and Business Party (Industri‑ og Næringspartiet)	1
Red Party (Rødt)	2
Centre Party (Senterpartiet)	2
Socialist Left Party (Sosialistisk Venstreparti)	2
Liberal Party (Venstre)	1
Total number of members:	27

Sortland kommunestyre 2019–2023
Party name (in Norwegian)	Number of representatives
Labour Party (Arbeiderpartiet)	5
Progress Party (Fremskrittspartiet)	2
Green Party (Miljøpartiet De Grønne)	1
Conservative Party (Høyre)	7
Red Party (Rødt)	3
Centre Party (Senterpartiet)	7
Socialist Left Party (Sosialistisk Venstreparti)	2
Total number of members:	27

Sortland kommunestyre 2015–2019
Party name (in Norwegian)	Number of representatives
Labour Party (Arbeiderpartiet)	8
Progress Party (Fremskrittspartiet)	2
Conservative Party (Høyre)	11
Red Party (Rødt)	3
Centre Party (Senterpartiet)	2
Socialist Left Party (Sosialistisk Venstreparti)	1
Total number of members:	27

Sortland kommunestyre 2011–2015
Party name (in Norwegian)	Number of representatives
Labour Party (Arbeiderpartiet)	9
Progress Party (Fremskrittspartiet)	4
Conservative Party (Høyre)	10
Red Party (Rødt)	2
Centre Party (Senterpartiet)	1
Socialist Left Party (Sosialistisk Venstreparti)	1
Total number of members:	27

Sortland kommunestyre 2007–2011
Party name (in Norwegian)	Number of representatives
Labour Party (Arbeiderpartiet)	12
Progress Party (Fremskrittspartiet)	7
Conservative Party (Høyre)	7
Christian Democratic Party (Kristelig Folkeparti)	1
Red Electoral Alliance (Rød Valgallianse)	2
Centre Party (Senterpartiet)	3
Socialist Left Party (Sosialistisk Venstreparti)	3
Total number of members:	35

Sortland kommunestyre 2003–2007
Party name (in Norwegian)	Number of representatives
Labour Party (Arbeiderpartiet)	9
Progress Party (Fremskrittspartiet)	5
Conservative Party (Høyre)	8
Christian Democratic Party (Kristelig Folkeparti)	1
Red Electoral Alliance (Rød Valgallianse)	1
Centre Party (Senterpartiet)	4
Socialist Left Party (Sosialistisk Venstreparti)	6
Liberal Party (Venstre)	1
Total number of members:	35

Sortland kommunestyre 1999–2003
Party name (in Norwegian)	Number of representatives
Labour Party (Arbeiderpartiet)	9
Progress Party (Fremskrittspartiet)	3
Conservative Party (Høyre)	10
Christian Democratic Party (Kristelig Folkeparti)	2
Red Electoral Alliance (Rød Valgallianse)	2
Centre Party (Senterpartiet)	4
Socialist Left Party (Sosialistisk Venstreparti)	4
Liberal Party (Venstre)	1
Total number of members:	35

Sortland kommunestyre 1995–1999
Party name (in Norwegian)	Number of representatives
Labour Party (Arbeiderpartiet)	8
Progress Party (Fremskrittspartiet)	2
Conservative Party (Høyre)	8
Christian Democratic Party (Kristelig Folkeparti)	2
Red Electoral Alliance (Rød Valgallianse)	2
Centre Party (Senterpartiet)	7
Socialist Left Party (Sosialistisk Venstreparti)	3
Joint list of the Liberals and Independent voters (Venstre og Uavhengige Velgere)	3
Total number of members:	35

Sortland kommunestyre 1991–1995
Party name (in Norwegian)	Number of representatives
Labour Party (Arbeiderpartiet)	13
Progress Party (Fremskrittspartiet)	2
Conservative Party (Høyre)	8
Christian Democratic Party (Kristelig Folkeparti)	2
Centre Party (Senterpartiet)	4
Socialist Left Party (Sosialistisk Venstreparti)	5
Liberal Party (Venstre)	1
Total number of members:	35

Sortland kommunestyre 1987–1991
Party name (in Norwegian)	Number of representatives
Labour Party (Arbeiderpartiet)	13
Progress Party (Fremskrittspartiet)	3
Conservative Party (Høyre)	10
Christian Democratic Party (Kristelig Folkeparti)	2
Centre Party (Senterpartiet)	2
Socialist Left Party (Sosialistisk Venstreparti)	3
Liberal Party (Venstre)	2
Total number of members:	35

Sortland kommunestyre 1983–1987
Party name (in Norwegian)	Number of representatives
Labour Party (Arbeiderpartiet)	13
Progress Party (Fremskrittspartiet)	1
Conservative Party (Høyre)	8
Christian Democratic Party (Kristelig Folkeparti)	2
Centre Party (Senterpartiet)	2
Socialist Left Party (Sosialistisk Venstreparti)	4
Liberal Party (Venstre)	2
Sigerfjord Area Non-party List (Sigerfjord og Omlands upolitiske liste)	2
Indre Eidsfjord List (Indre Eidsfjord Liste)	1
Total number of members:	35

Sortland kommunestyre 1979–1983
Party name (in Norwegian)	Number of representatives
Labour Party (Arbeiderpartiet)	11
Conservative Party (Høyre)	9
Christian Democratic Party (Kristelig Folkeparti)	3
Centre Party (Senterpartiet)	3
Socialist Left Party (Sosialistisk Venstreparti)	3
Liberal Party (Venstre)	2
Sigerfjord Area Non-party List (Sigerfjord og Omlands upolitiske liste)	2
Indre Eidsfjord List (Indre Eidsfjord Liste)	2
Total number of members:	35

Sortland kommunestyre 1975–1979
Party name (in Norwegian)	Number of representatives
Labour Party (Arbeiderpartiet)	12
Conservative Party (Høyre)	5
Christian Democratic Party (Kristelig Folkeparti)	3
Centre Party (Senterpartiet)	6
Socialist Left Party (Sosialistisk Venstreparti)	3
Liberal Party (Venstre)	2
Sigerfjord Area List (Sigerfjord og Omlands Liste)	4
Total number of members:	35

Sortland kommunestyre 1971–1975
Party name (in Norwegian)	Number of representatives
Labour Party (Arbeiderpartiet)	15
Conservative Party (Høyre)	3
Christian Democratic Party (Kristelig Folkeparti)	3
Centre Party (Senterpartiet)	5
Socialist People's Party (Sosialistisk Folkeparti)	3
Liberal Party (Venstre)	2
Local List(s) (Lokale lister)	4
Total number of members:	35

Sortland kommunestyre 1967–1971
Party name (in Norwegian)	Number of representatives
Labour Party (Arbeiderpartiet)	16
Conservative Party (Høyre)	4
Christian Democratic Party (Kristelig Folkeparti)	3
Centre Party (Senterpartiet)	3
Socialist People's Party (Sosialistisk Folkeparti)	3
Liberal Party (Venstre)	3
Local List(s) (Lokale lister)	3
Total number of members:	35

Sortland kommunestyre 1963–1967
Party name (in Norwegian)	Number of representatives
Labour Party (Arbeiderpartiet)	17
Conservative Party (Høyre)	4
Christian Democratic Party (Kristelig Folkeparti)	3
Centre Party (Senterpartiet)	2
Socialist People's Party (Sosialistisk Folkeparti)	2
Liberal Party (Venstre)	4
Local List(s) (Lokale lister)	3
Total number of members:	35

Sortland herredsstyre 1959–1963
Party name (in Norwegian)	Number of representatives
Labour Party (Arbeiderpartiet)	10
Conservative Party (Høyre)	3
Christian Democratic Party (Kristelig Folkeparti)	2
Centre Party (Senterpartiet)	2
Liberal Party (Venstre)	3
Local List(s) (Lokale lister)	3
Total number of members:	23

Sortland herredsstyre 1955–1959
Party name (in Norwegian)	Number of representatives
Labour Party (Arbeiderpartiet)	11
Conservative Party (Høyre)	1
Christian Democratic Party (Kristelig Folkeparti)	2
Farmers' Party (Bondepartiet)	1
Liberal Party (Venstre)	4
Local List(s) (Lokale lister)	4
Total number of members:	23

Sortland herredsstyre 1951–1955
Party name (in Norwegian)	Number of representatives
Labour Party (Arbeiderpartiet)	11
Conservative Party (Høyre)	1
Farmers' Party (Bondepartiet)	1
Liberal Party (Venstre)	6
Local List(s) (Lokale lister)	1
Total number of members:	20

Sortland herredsstyre 1947–1951
Party name (in Norwegian)	Number of representatives
Labour Party (Arbeiderpartiet)	11
Conservative Party (Høyre)	3
Communist Party (Kommunistiske Parti)	1
Liberal Party (Venstre)	5
Total number of members:	20

Sortland herredsstyre 1945–1947
Party name (in Norwegian)	Number of representatives
Labour Party (Arbeiderpartiet)	14
Christian Democratic Party (Kristelig Folkeparti)	1
Liberal Party (Venstre)	3
Joint List(s) of Non-Socialist Parties (Borgerlige Felleslister)	1
Local List(s) (Lokale lister)	1
Total number of members:	20

Sortland herredsstyre 1937–1941*
Party name (in Norwegian)	Number of representatives
Labour Party (Arbeiderpartiet)	11
Liberal Party (Venstre)	4
List of workers, fishermen, and small farmholders (Arbeidere, fiskere, småbrukere liste)	3
Local List(s) (Lokale lister)	2
Total number of members:	20
Note: Due to the German occupation of Norway during World War II, no elections were held for new municipal councils until after the war ended in 1945.

=== Mayors ===
The mayor (Norwegian: ordfører) of Sortland Municipality is the political leader of the municipality and the chairperson of the municipal council. Here is a list of people who have held this position:

- 1841–1841: Abel Ellingsen
- 1842–1843: Jørgen Ottesen
- 1844–1852: Abel Ellingsen
- 1853–1856: C.H. Schanche
- 1857–1868: Abel Ellingsen
- 1869–1870: Laurits Ottesen
- 1871–1874: Anton Holst
- 1875–1876: Kristoffer Johnsen
- 1877–1880: Laurits Ottesen
- 1881–1882: E. Dietrichen
- 1883–1884: Laurits Ottesen
- 1885–1892: H. Knudsen
- 1893–1894: H.M. Stoltz
- 1895–1896: Jens N.A. Ellingsen
- 1897–1901: H. Knudsen
- 1902–1904: H.M. Stoltz
- 1905–1907: H. Knudsen
- 1908–1910: H.M. Stoltz
- 1911–1913: Georg Ellingsen
- 1914–1916: Olaf Holm
- 1917–1919: J.D. Hammer
- 1920–1922: Bernhard J. Steiro
- 1923–1925: Dag Ellingsen
- 1926–1926: Per Lunde
- 1927–1928: Andreas Thomassen
- 1929–1931: Anton J. Myhre
- 1932–1934: Ottar Lunde
- 1935–1936: Halvdan Bygdnes
- 1937–1940: P.C. Reinsnes (Ap)
- 1946–1959: P.C. Reinsnes (Ap)
- 1960–1962: Ottar Wik
- 1963–1975: P.C. Reinsnes (Ap)
- 1976–1979: Thormod Olsen (H)
- 1980–1981: Terje Johanssen
- 1982–1987: Anton Pettersen
- 1988–1994: Hill-Marta Solberg (Ap)
- 1994–1995: Ronald Steen
- 1995–2003: Ingolf Markussen (H)
- 2003–2011: Svein Roar Jacobsen (Ap)
- 2011–2015: Grete Ellingsen (H)
- 2015–2019: Tove Mette Bjørkmo (Ap)
- 2019–2023: Karl-Erling Nordlund (Sp)
- 2023–present: Grete Ellingsen (H)

== Music and culture ==
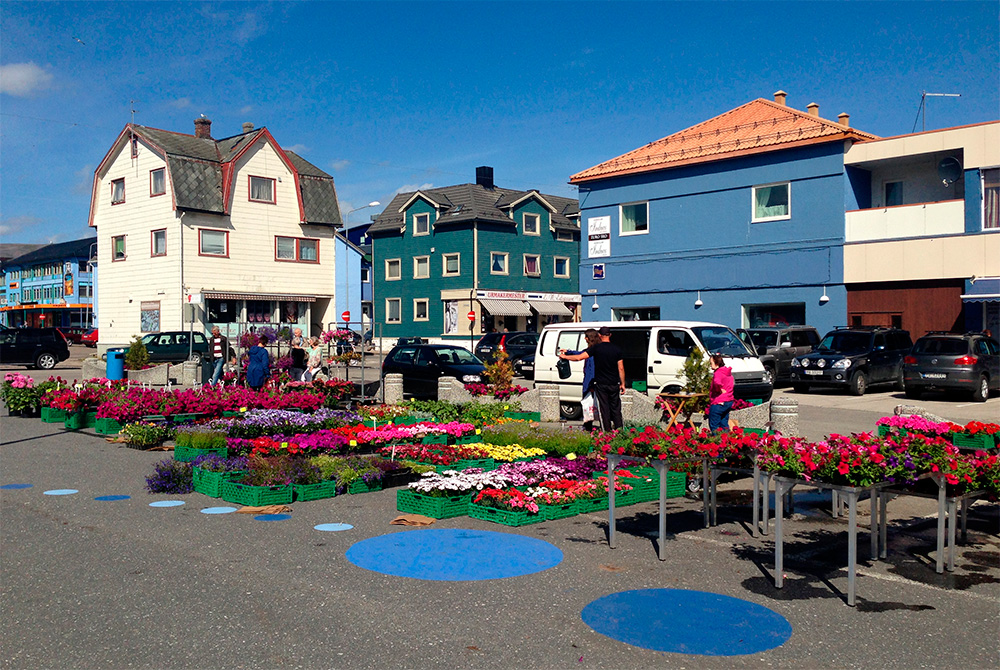
The market square in downtown Sortland a day in June 2013.

Sortland has been regarded as one of the best music communities in Norway, and the local band Madrugada has been one of the best ones in the nation. Sortland Jazz Festival is an event organized by Sortland Jazz and Music Club, which takes place every autumn. Some of the world's leading jazz musicians have been participating.

== Shopping ==
Sortland is the largest commercial centre in Vesterålen with several indoors shopping centers and many small businesses. The retail turnover per inhabitant in Sortland is greater than in any other town in North Norway. Sortland is one of the few North Norwegian towns that have grown annually since the 1970s.

== Notable people ==
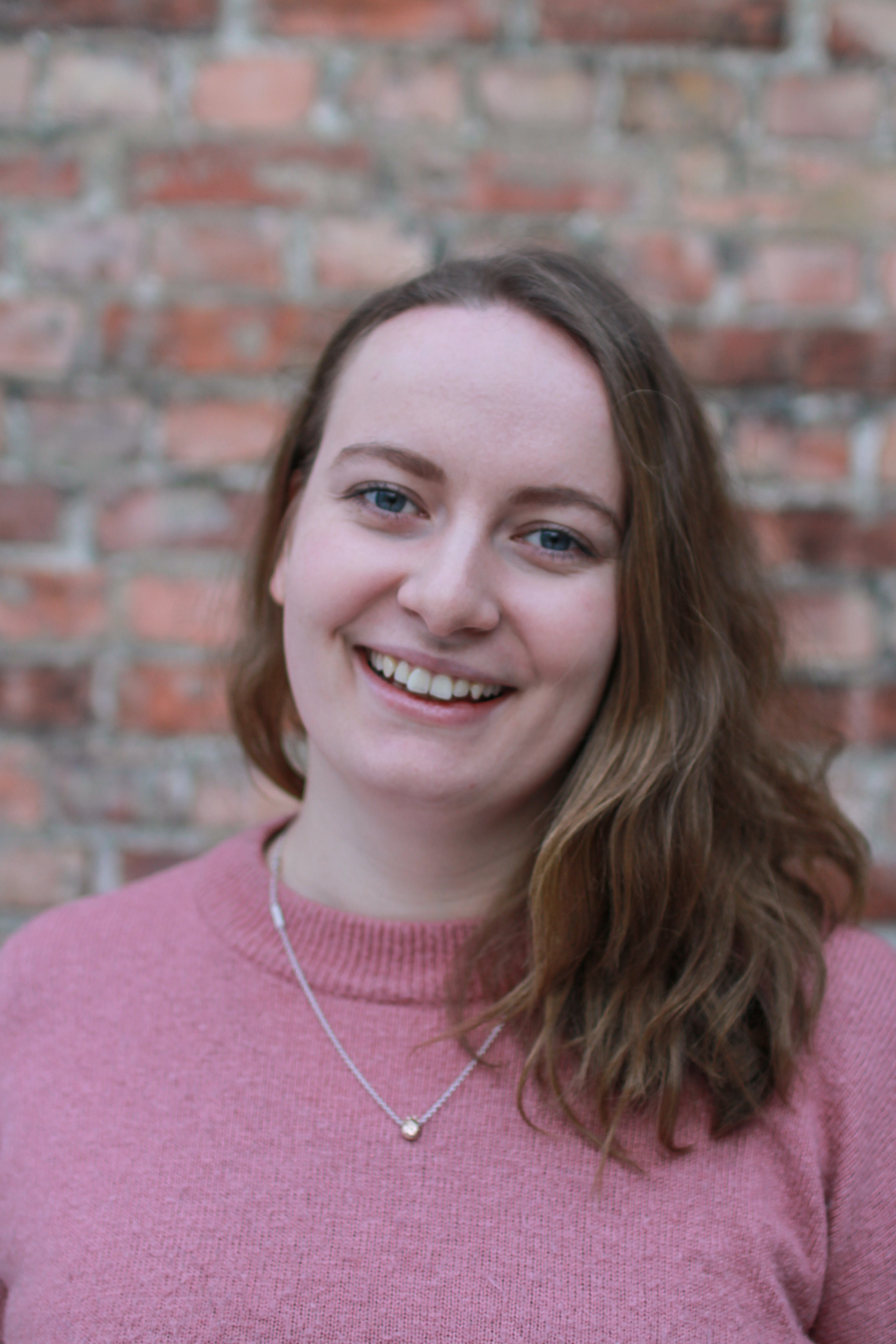
Ingrid Skjoldvær, 2016

- Knut Hamsun (1859–1952), the Nobel Prize–winning author wrote his novel Den Sidste Glæde (The Last Joy) in Sortland Hotel in 1911/12
- Petter Carl Reinsnes (1904 in Reinsnes – 1976), a politician and long-time Mayor of Sortland
- Hill-Marta Solberg (born 1951 in Sortland), a politician and County Governor of Nordland
- Lars Saabye Christensen (born 1953,) a Norwegian/Danish author who lived in Sortland
- Olav Christopher Jenssen (born 1954 in Sortland), an artist and academic
- Oddmund Finnseth (born 1957 in Sortland), a jazz musician, composer and music teacher
- Sivert Høyem (born 1976 in Kleiva), a singer with the rock band Madrugada
- Krister Wemberg (born 1992 in Sortland), a footballer with over 200 club caps
- Ingrid Skjoldvær (born 1993), an environmentalist with Nature and Youth

== Gallery ==
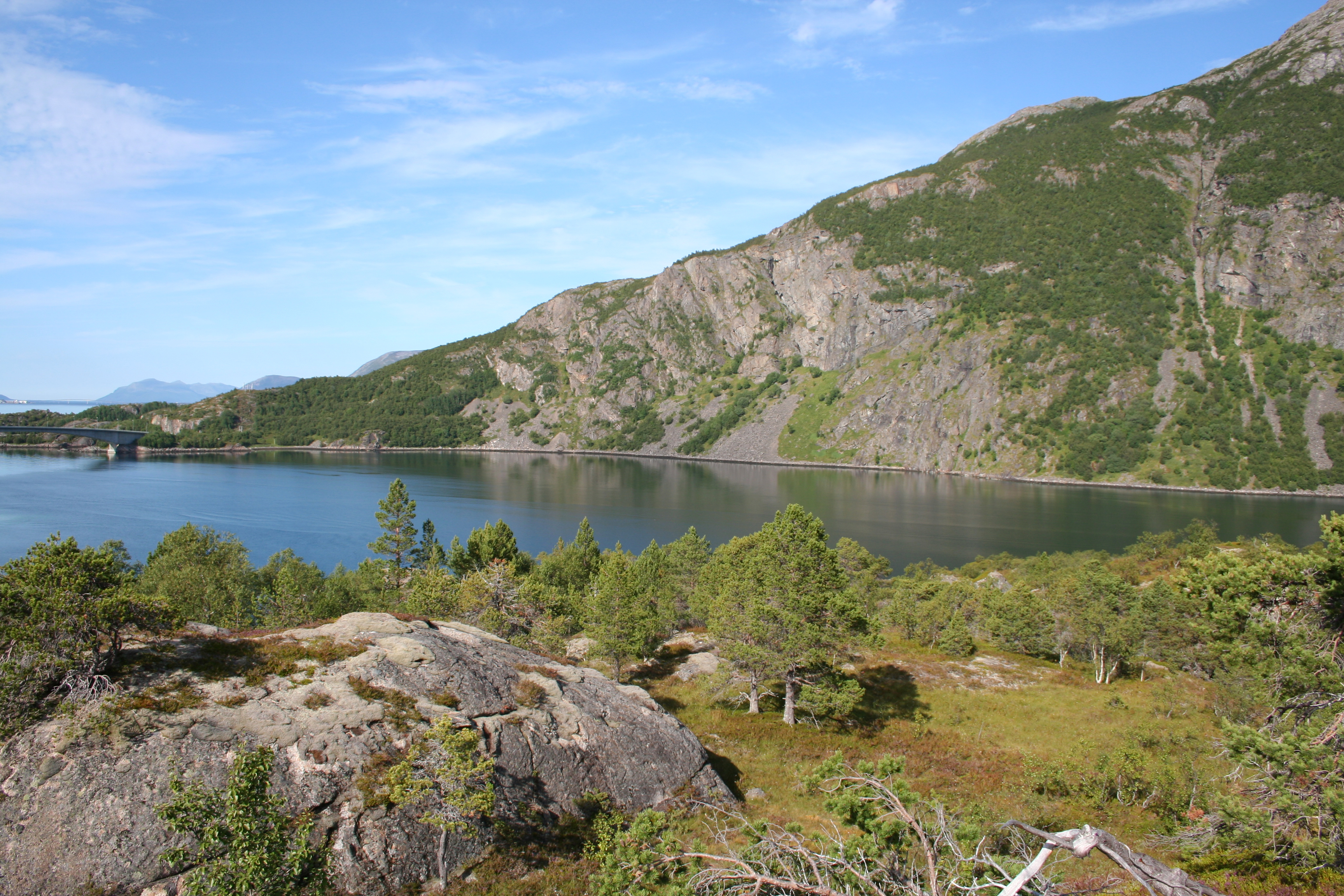
Djupfjorden in Sortland

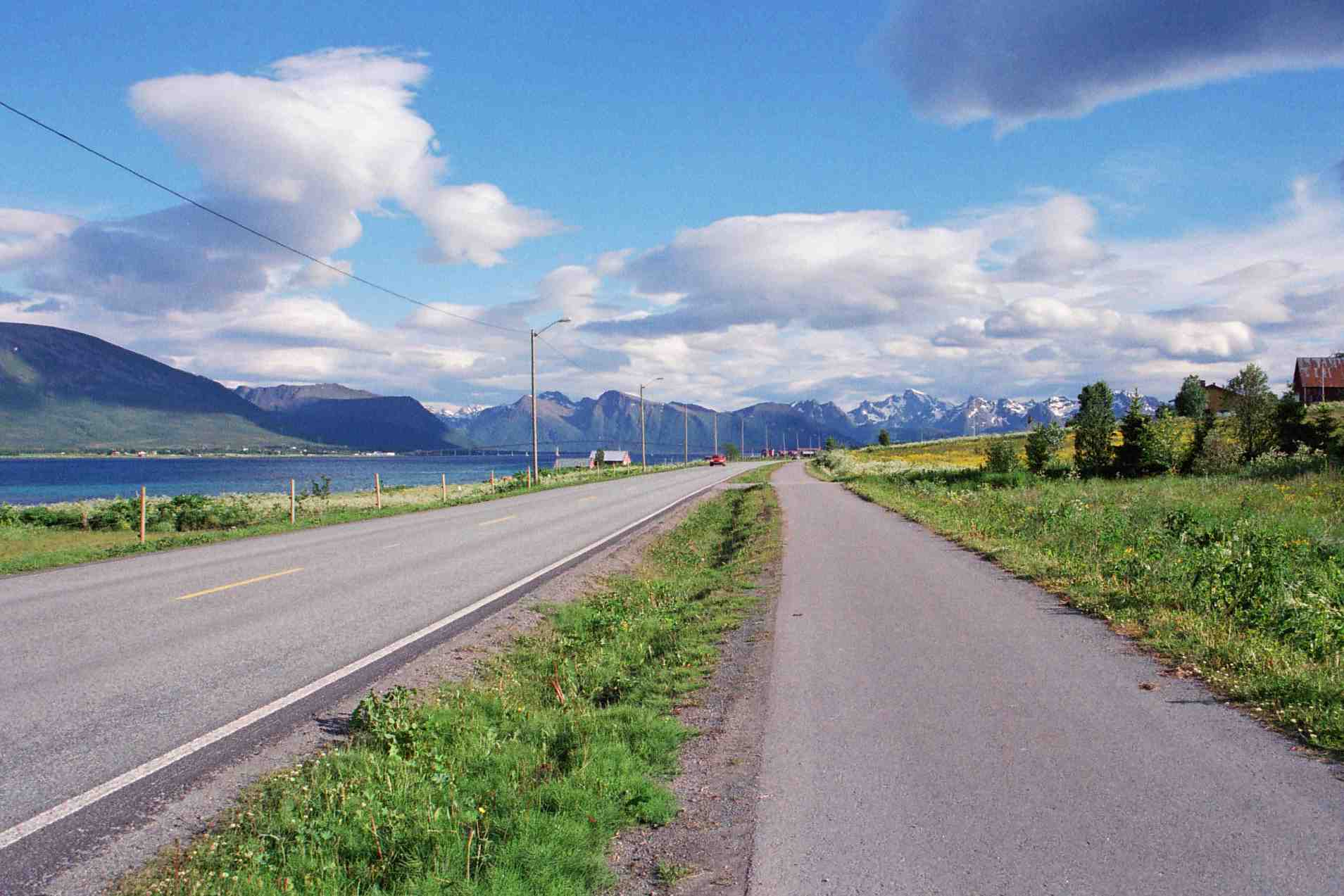
View from Sortland looking south

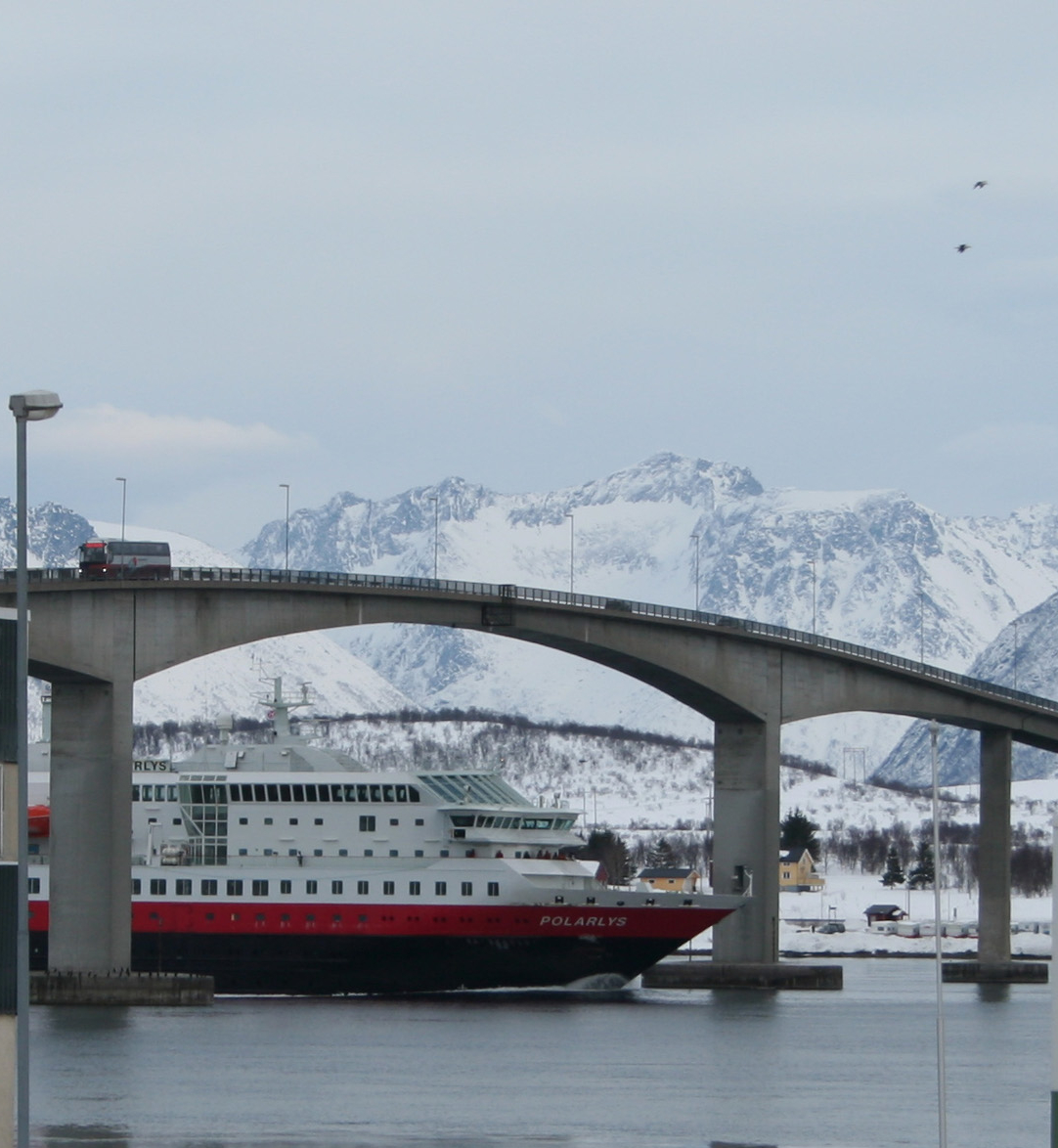
Sortland Bridge and Hurtigruta, February 2007.

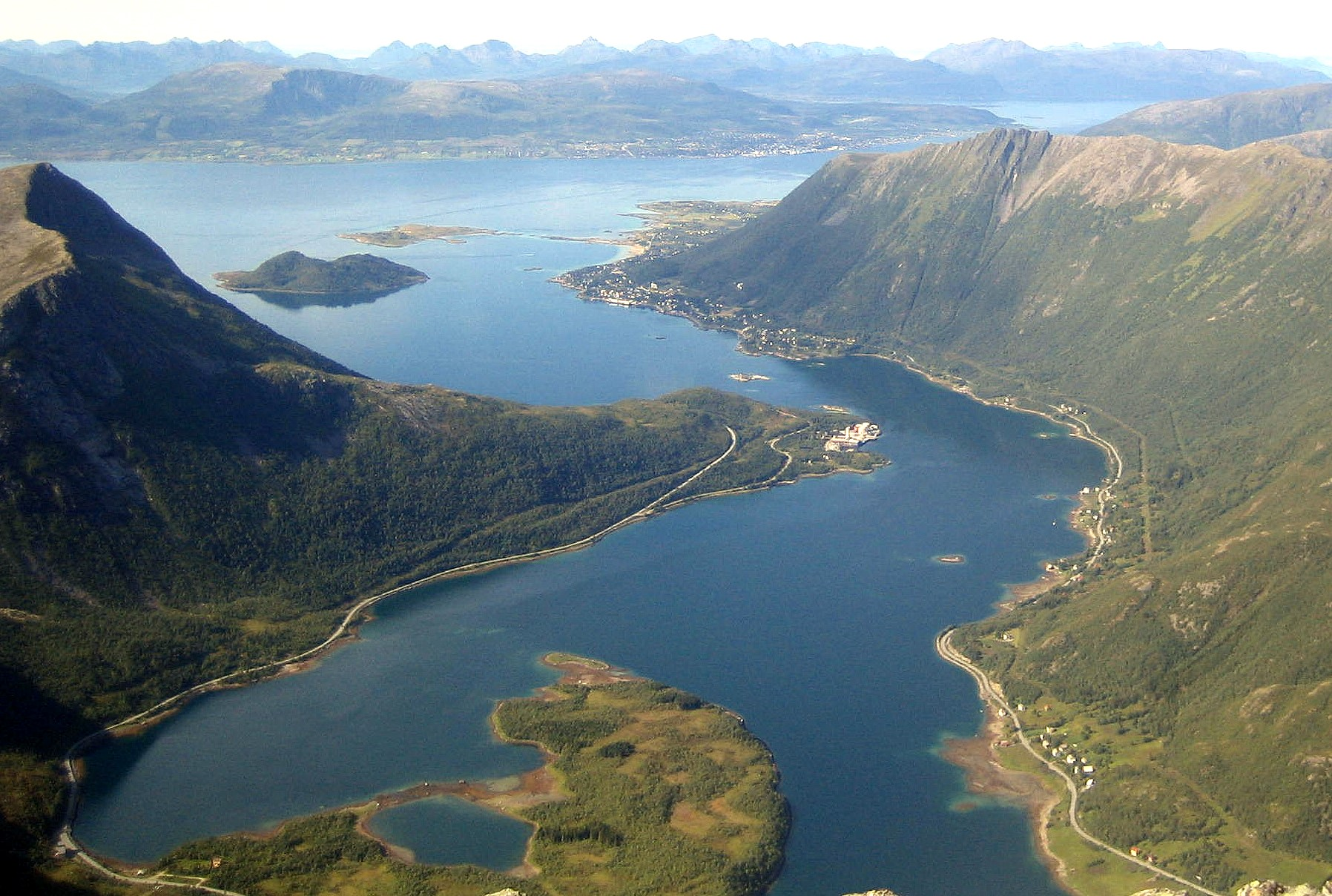
View of the Sigerfjorden. The village closest is Sigerfjord, and across the sound in the background is Sortland town.
