= Grete Ellingsen =

Norwegian politician

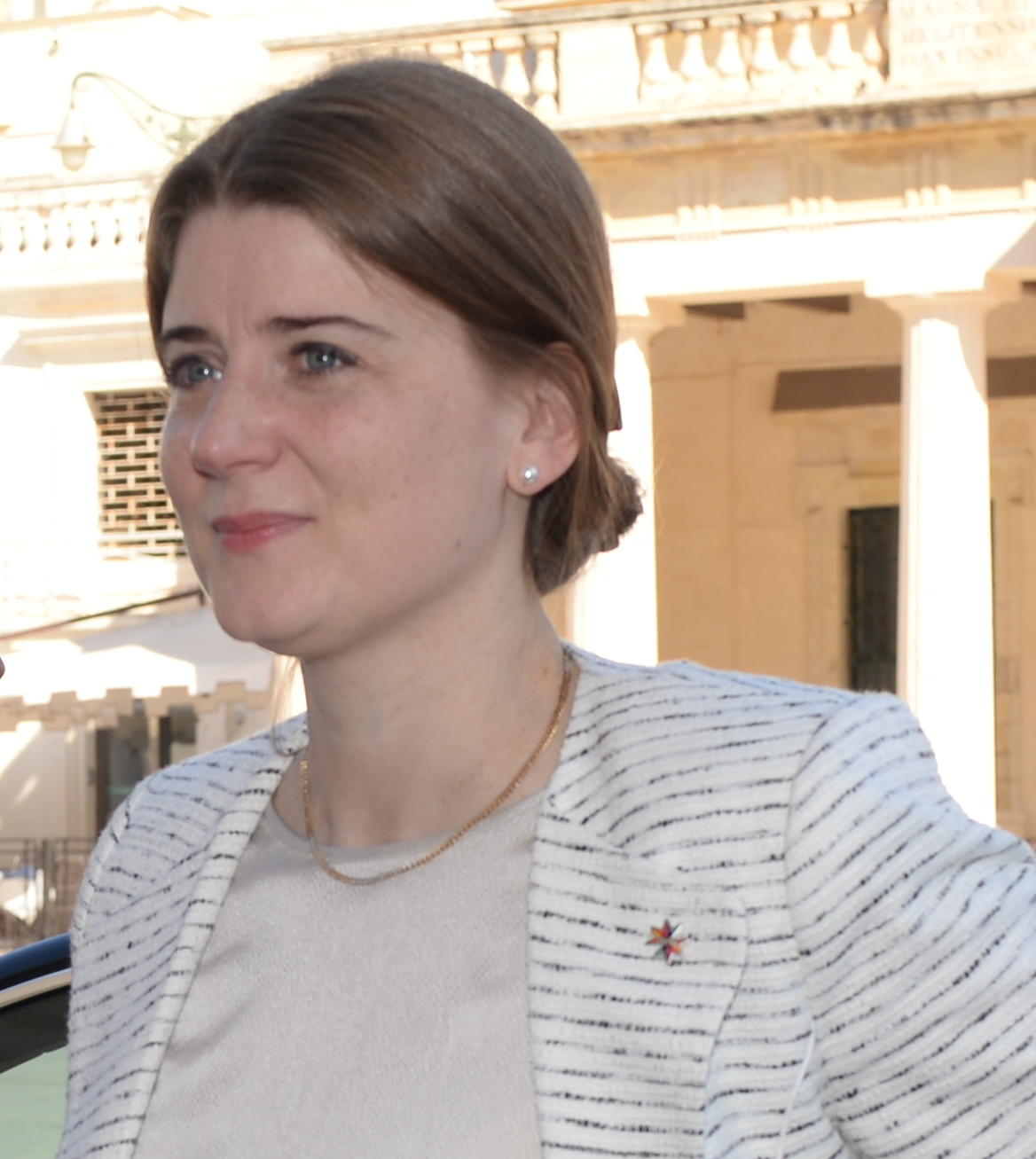
Grete Ellingsen in 2017.

Grete Ellingsen (born 20 January 1976) is a Norwegian politician for the Conservative Party.

She was a State Secretary in the Ministry of Local Government and Modernisation from 2015 to 2017, serving in Solberg's Cabinet. She had served as a deputy representative to the Parliament of Norway from Nordland during the term 2009–2013, albeit without meeting in parliamentary session. She was also mayor of Sortland Municipality from 2011 to 2015.

She is educated as a jurist. Her board memberships include being chair of Sykehusapotek Nord and Nordnorsk Kunstmuseum.
