= Sigerfjord Church =

Church in Nordland, Norway

- Sigerfjord kirke
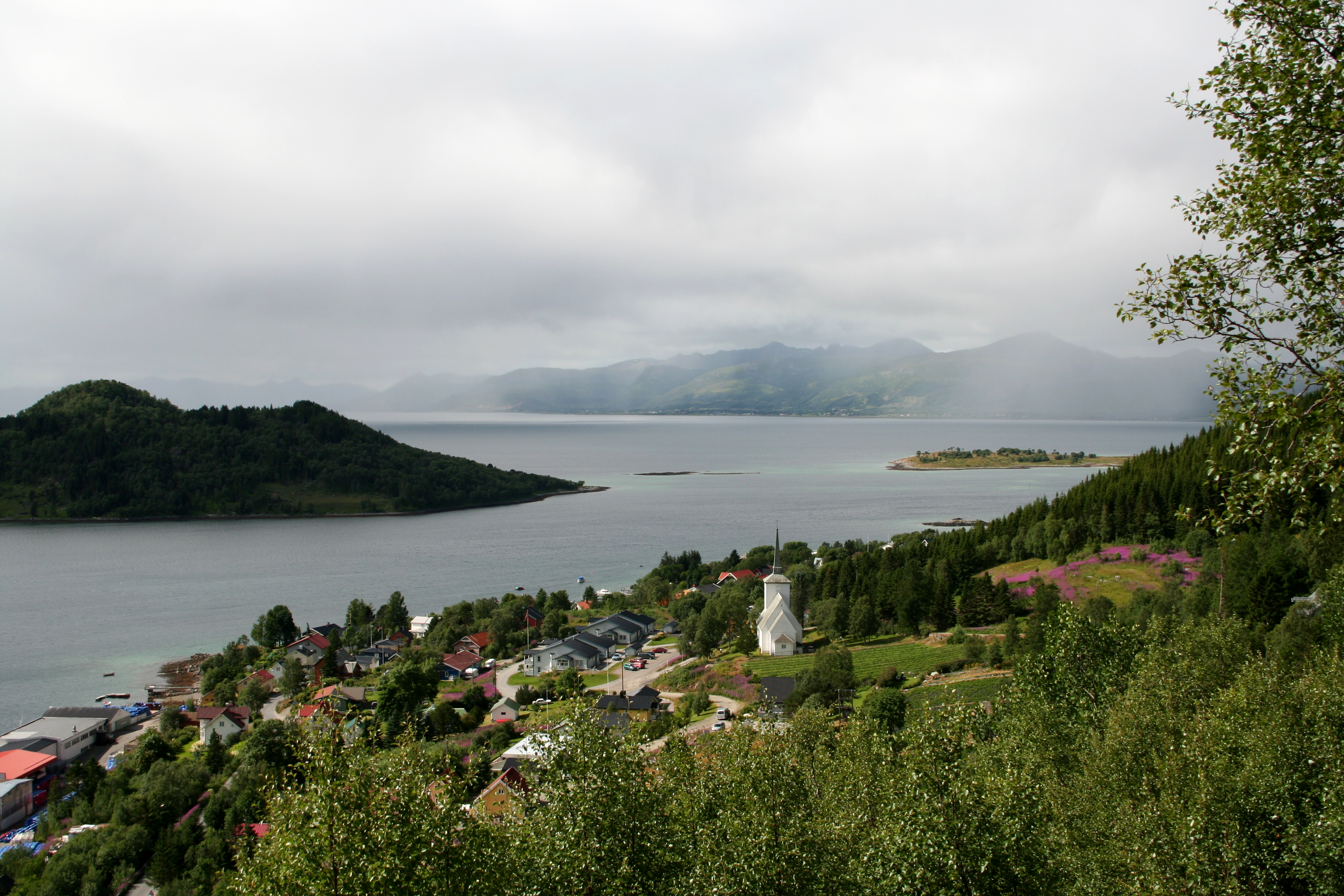
- View of the church
- Sigerfjord Church
- 68.64401791°N 15.51916882°E
- Location: Sortland Municipality, Nordland
- Country: Norway
- Denomination: Church of Norway
- Churchmanship: Evangelical Lutheran

History
- Status: Parish church
- Founded: 1933
- Consecrated: 17 May 1933

Architecture
- Functional status: Active
- Architect: Harald Sund
- Architectural type: Long church
- Completed: 1933 (93 years ago)

Specifications
- Capacity: 280
- Materials: Wood

Administration
- Diocese: Sør-Hålogaland
- Deanery: Vesterålen prosti
- Parish: Sortland
- Norwegian Cultural Heritage Site
- Type: Church
- Status: Listed
- ID: 85427

Sigerfjord Church (Norwegian: Sigerfjord kirke) is a parish church of the Church of Norway in Sortland Municipality in Nordland county, Norway. It is located in the village of Sigerfjord on the island of Hinnøya. It is one of the three churches for the Sortland parish which is part of the Vesterålen prosti (deanery) in the Diocese of Sør-Hålogaland. The white, wooden church was built in a long church style in 1933 using plans drawn up by the architect Harald Sund. The church seats about 280 people. The church was consecrated on 17 May 1933.

== See also ==
- List of churches in Sør-Hålogaland
