= Kvalsaukan Bridge =

Kvalsaukan Bridge Kvalsaukan bru
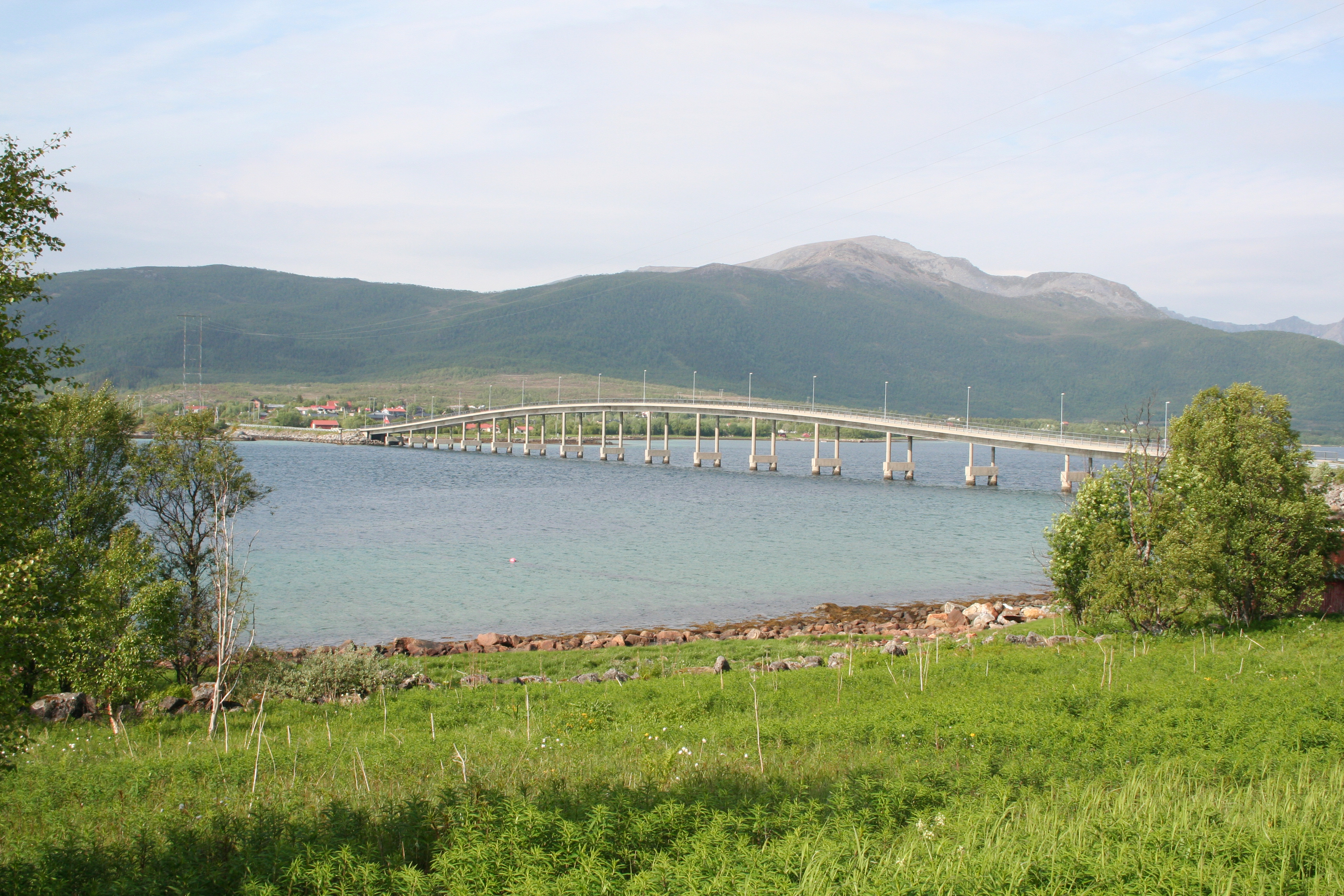
- View of the bridge
- Coordinates: 68°43′32″N 15°31′23″E
- Carries: Fv82
- Crosses: Hognfjorden
- Locale: Sortland Municipality, Norway

Characteristics
- Total length: 425 metres (1,394 ft)
- Clearance below: 8 metres (26 ft)

History
- Opened: 1975

The Kvalsaukan Bridge (Norwegian: Kvalsaukan bru) is a bridge that crosses the Hognfjorden in Sortland Municipality in Nordland county, Norway. It is part of the Norwegian County Road 82 between the town of Sortland and the neighboring Andøy Municipality. The bridge is 425 metres (1,394 ft) long and the maximum clearance to the sea is 8 metres (26 ft).

The Kvalsaukan Bridge was opened in 1975. It was one of four bridges that were built in the 1970s to connect the islands of Vesterålen to each other. The other bridges that were built during that period are the Sortland Bridge, Andøy Bridge, and Hadsel Bridge. Together with the Tjeldsund Bridge near Harstad, these bridges connect the islands of Vesterålen to the mainland. The Kvalsaukan Bridge is the only one of these four bridges that was never a toll bridge.

== See also ==
- List of bridges in Norway
- List of bridges in Norway by length
- List of bridges
- List of bridges by length
