= Andøy Bridge =

Andøy Bridge Andøybrua
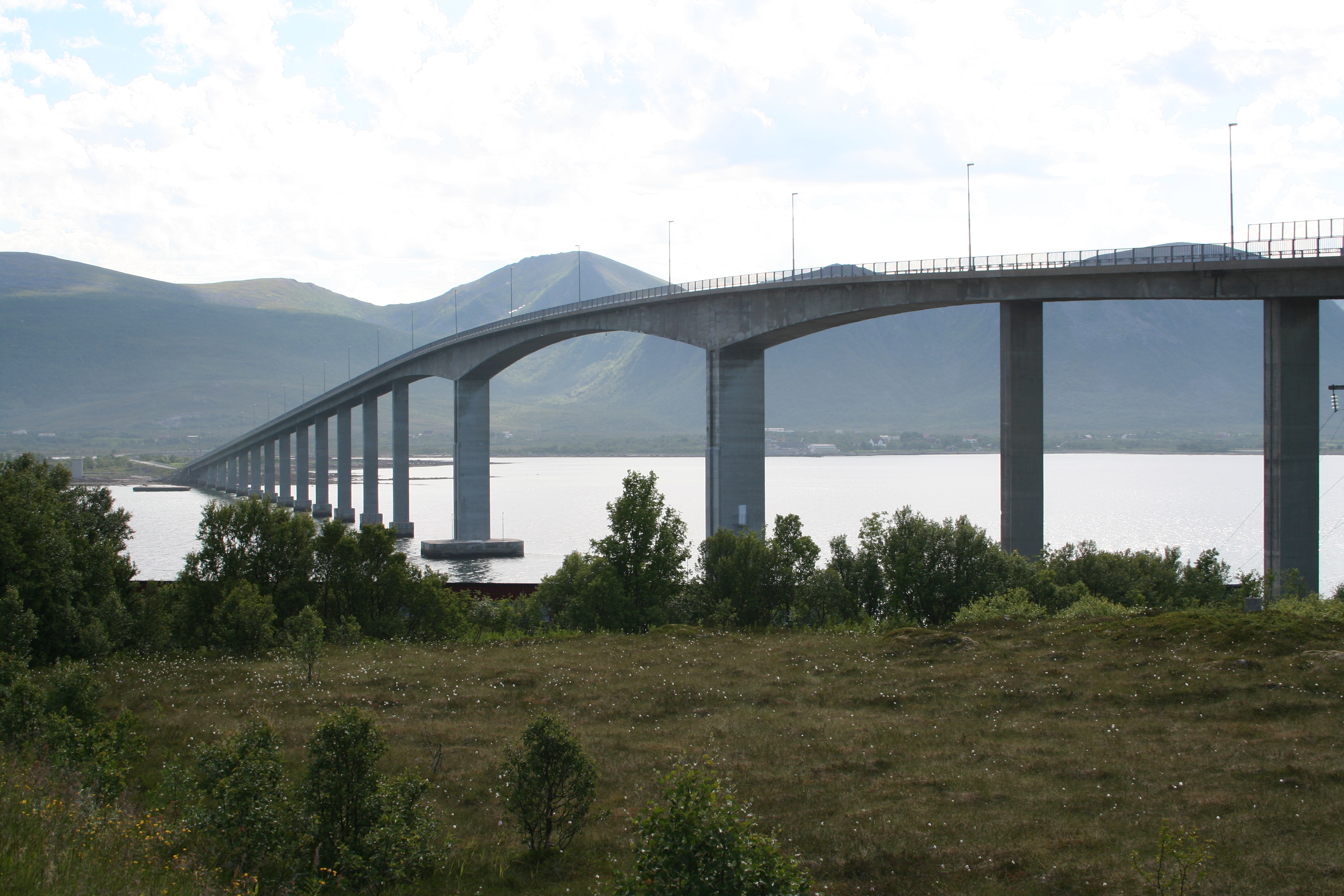
- View of the bridge
- Coordinates: 68°57′52″N 15°38′19″E
- Carries: Fv82
- Crosses: Risøysundet
- Locale: Andøy Municipality, Norway

Characteristics
- Total length: 750 metres (2,460 ft)
- Longest span: 110 metres (360 ft)
- No. of spans: 21
- Clearance below: 30 metres (98 ft)

History
- Opened: 1974

The Andøy Bridge (Norwegian: Andøybrua) is a cantilever road bridge that crosses the Risøysundet strait between the islands of Andøya and Hinnøya in Andøy Municipality in Nordland county, Norway. The northern end of the bridge is located in the village of Risøyhamn. The bridge is 750 metres (2,460 ft) long, the main span is 110 metres (360 ft), and the maximum clearance to the sea is 30 metres (98 ft). The bridge has 21 spans.

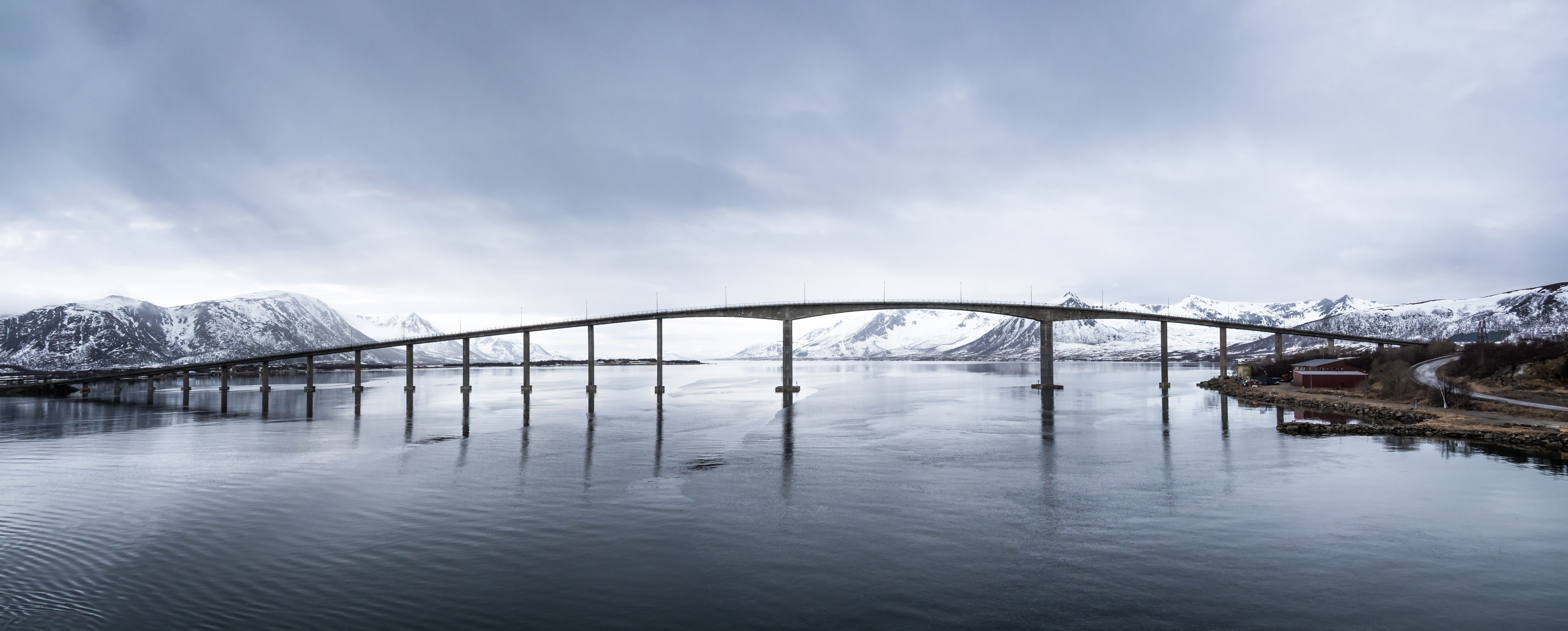

The Andøy Bridge was opened in 1974. It was one of four bridges that were built in the 1970s to connect the islands of Vesterålen to each other. The other bridges that were built during that period are the Hadsel Bridge, Sortland Bridge, and Kvalsaukan Bridge. Together with the Tjeldsund Bridge in Harstad Municipality, these bridges connect the islands of Vesterålen to the mainland. The Andøy Bridge was a toll bridge for many years after its opening.

== See also ==
- List of bridges in Norway
- List of bridges in Norway by length
- List of bridges
- List of bridges by length
