= Sortland Bridge =

Sortland Bridge Sortlandsbrua
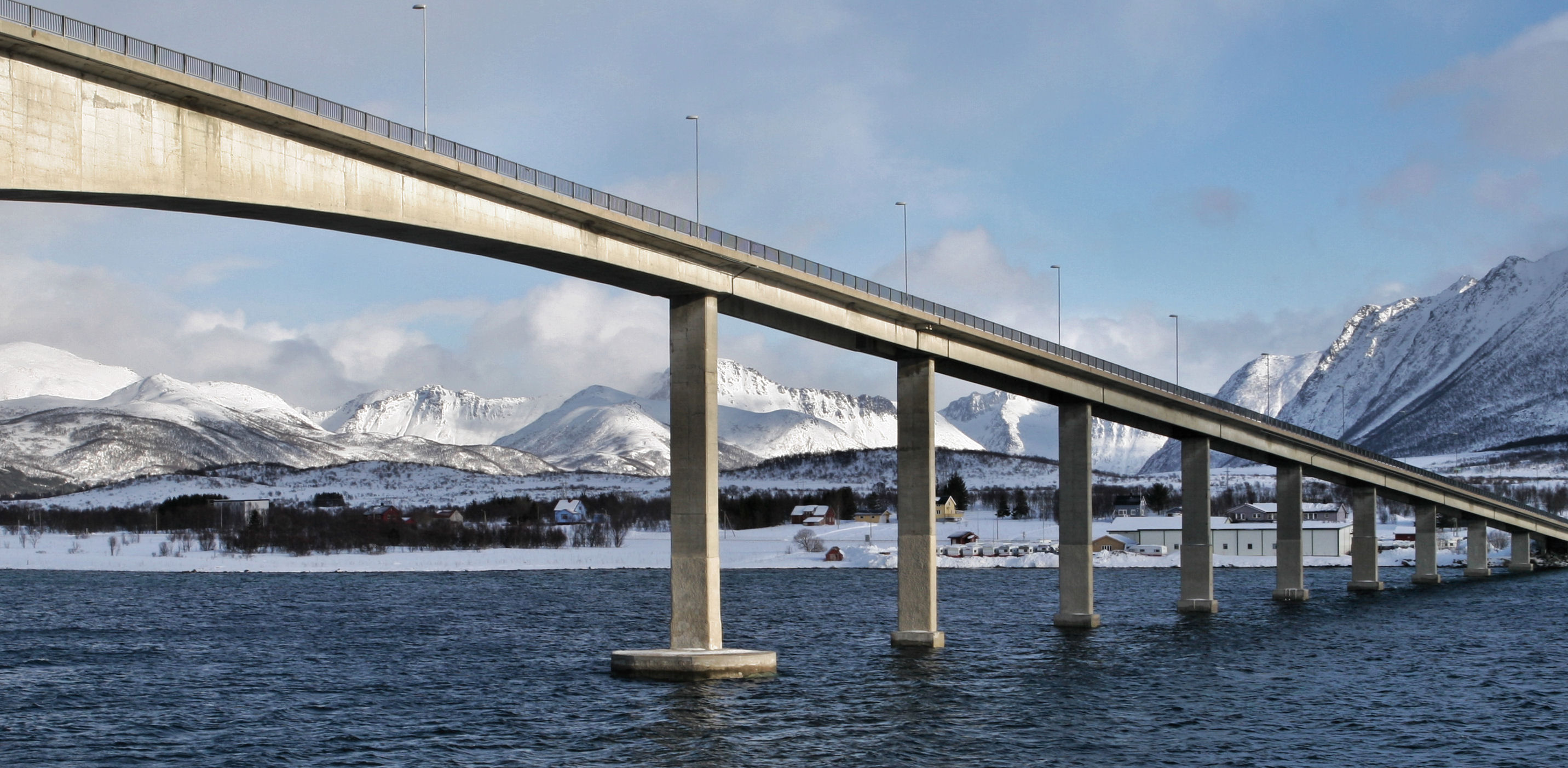
- View of the bridge (winter 2006-2007)
- Coordinates: 68°42′24″N 15°25′40″E
- Carries: Fv82
- Crosses: Sortlandssundet
- Locale: Sortland Municipality, Norway

Characteristics
- Design: Cantilever
- Total length: 948 metres (3,110 ft)
- Longest span: 150 metres (490 ft)
- No. of spans: 21
- Clearance above: 30 metres (98 ft)

History
- Opened: 1975

The Sortland Bridge (Norwegian: Sortlandsbrua) is a cantilever road bridge that crosses the Sortlandssundet strait between the village of Strand on Hinnøya island and the town of Sortland on Langøya island. It is located within Sortland Municipality in Nordland county, Norway. The bridge is 948 metres (3,110 ft) long, the main span is 150 metres (490 ft), and the maximum clearance to the sea is 30 metres (98 ft). The bridge has 21 spans.

The Sortland Bridge was opened in 1975. It was one of four bridges that were built in the 1970s to connect the islands of Vesterålen to each other. The other bridges that were built during that period are the Hadsel Bridge, Andøy Bridge, and Kvalsaukan Bridge. Together with the Tjeldsund Bridge near Harstad, these bridges connect the islands of Vesterålen to the mainland. The Sortland Bridge was a toll bridge for many years after its opening. Before the bridge was built, a ferry carried passengers across the strait. The ferry crossing was one of the busiest in Norway.

== See also ==
- List of bridges in Norway
- List of bridges in Norway by length
- List of bridges
- List of bridges by length
