= Sortlandssundet =

Strait in Nordland, Norway

Sortlandssundet (Norwegian); Suorttánuorri (Northern Sami)
- Sortlandsundet (Norwegian)
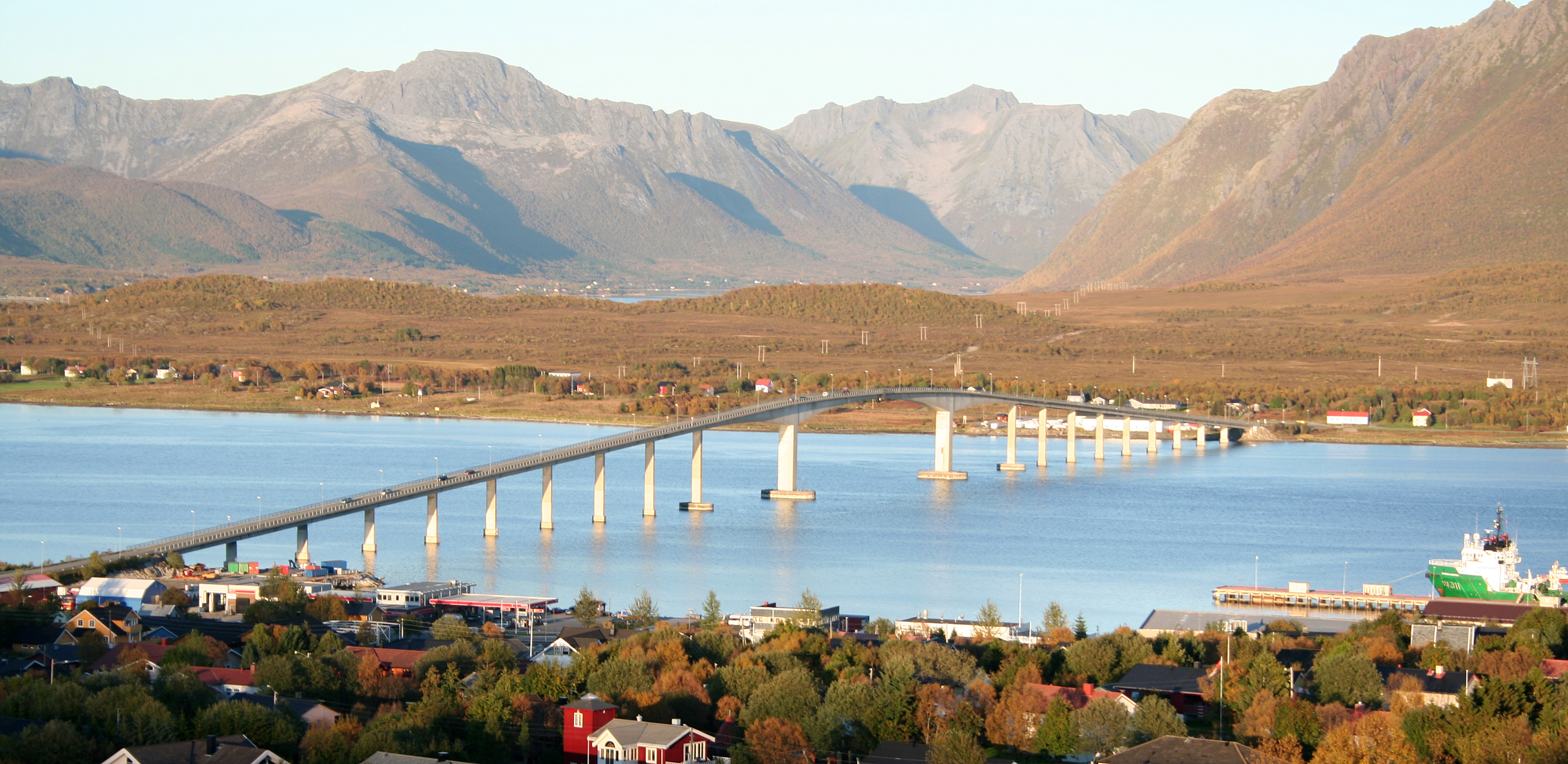
- View of the fjord
- Interactive map of the fjord
- Location: Nordland county, Norway
- Coordinates: 68.8047°N 15.4172°E
- Type: Strait
- Primary inflows: Gavlfjorden
- Primary outflows: Hadselfjorden
- Basin countries: Norway
- Max. length: 30 kilometres (19 mi)
- Settlements: Sortland

Sortlandssundet (Norwegian) or Suorttánuorri (Northern Sami) (lit. 'Sortland Sound') is a strait or sound in Sortland Municipality in Nordland county, Norway. It separates the islands of Langøya and Hinnøya and it connects the Hadselfjorden in the south and the Gavlfjorden in the north. The Sortland Bridge is the only bridge that crosses the 30-kilometre (19 mi) long strait.
