= Sortland (town) =

Town in Sortland Municipality, Norway

Sortland: Sortland (Norwegian); Suortá (Northern Sami)
- Town/City
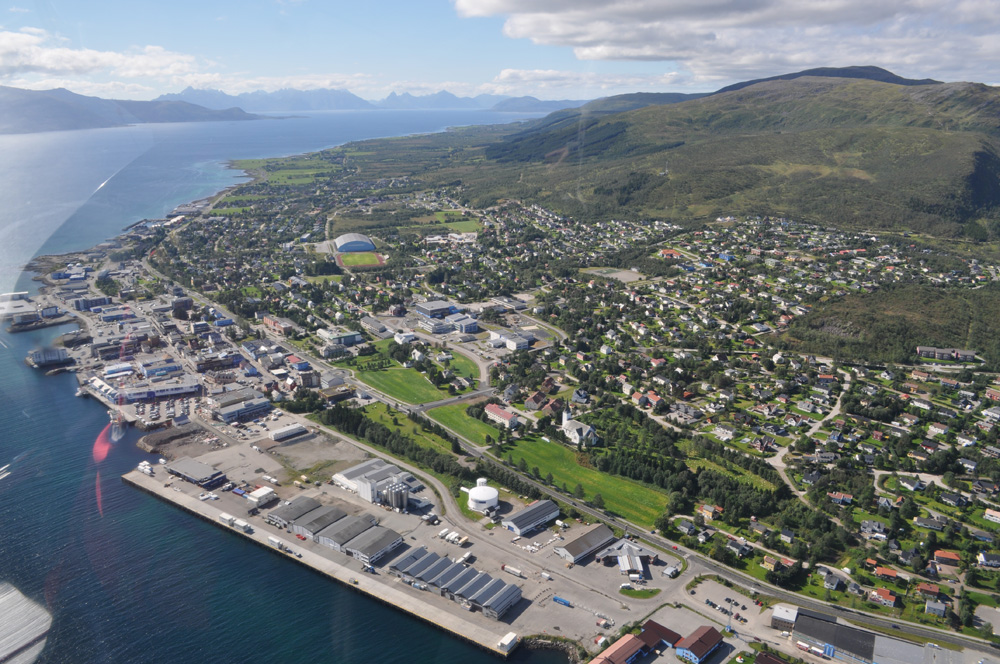
- View of the town
- Interactive map of Sortland
- Location within Nordland Location within Norway
- Coordinates: 68.6982°N 15.4138°E
- Country: Norway
- Region: Northern Norway
- County: Nordland
- District: Vesterålen
- Municipality: Sortland Municipality
- Established as
- Town (By): 1997

Area
  - Total: 3.79 km^{2} (1.46 sq mi)
- Elevation: 12 m (39 ft)

Population (2023)
  - Total: 5,609
  - Density: 1,480/km^{2} (3,800/sq mi)
- Demonym(s): Sortlending; Sortlandssunding
- Time zone: UTC+01:00 (CET)
  - Summer (DST): UTC+02:00 (CEST)
- Post Code: 8400 Sortland

Sortland (Norwegian) or Suortá (Northern Sami) is a town and the administrative centre of Sortland Municipality in Nordland county, Norway. The town is located on the east coast of the island of Langøya, along the Sortlandsundet strait. In 1997, the municipality decided to declare "town status" for the urban area of Sortland. Sortland is the largest town and commercial centre in the whole Vesterålen region and is often referred to as "the blue town by the strait" (den blå byen ved sundet) since many of the buildings are painted blue.

The 3.79-square-kilometre (940-acre) town has a population (2023) of 5,609 and a population density of 1,480 inhabitants per square kilometre (3,800/sq mi).

The Norwegian National Road 85 highway begins at Sortland and crosses the Sortland Bridge to connect the town to the nearby European route E10 highway on the neighboring island of Hinnøya.

The town has a regional high school, a cultural centre, library, cinema, Sortland Museum, and Sortland Church. The town is also a regular stop of the Hurtigruten boats.

== Etymology ==
The town (and municipality) is named after the old Sortland farm (Old Norse: Svortuland) since the first Sortland Church was built there. The first element is Svort which is the genitive case of the local river name Svorta. The river name is derived from svartr which means "black" or "dark". The last element is land which means "land" or "farm".

== Media gallery ==
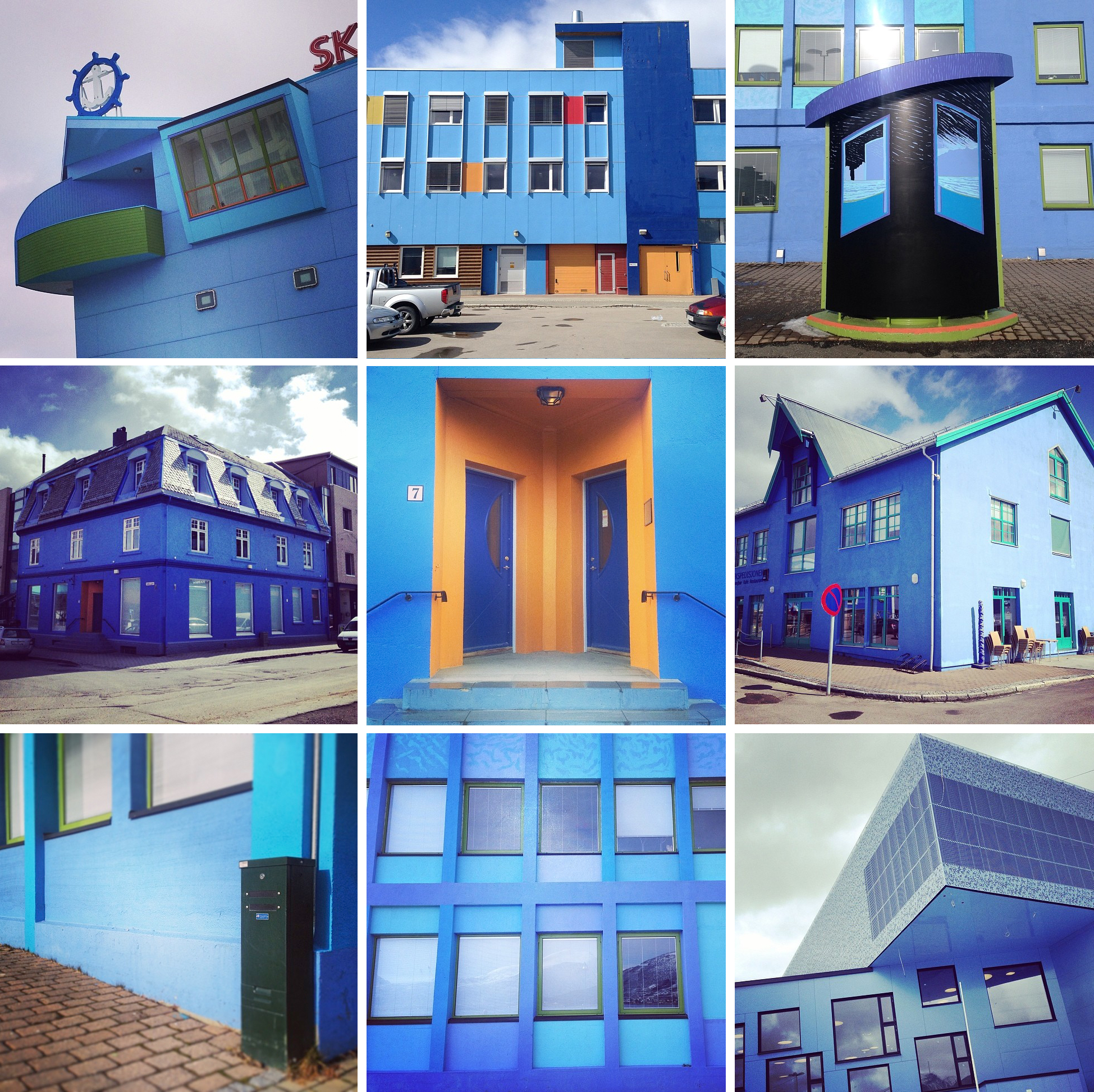

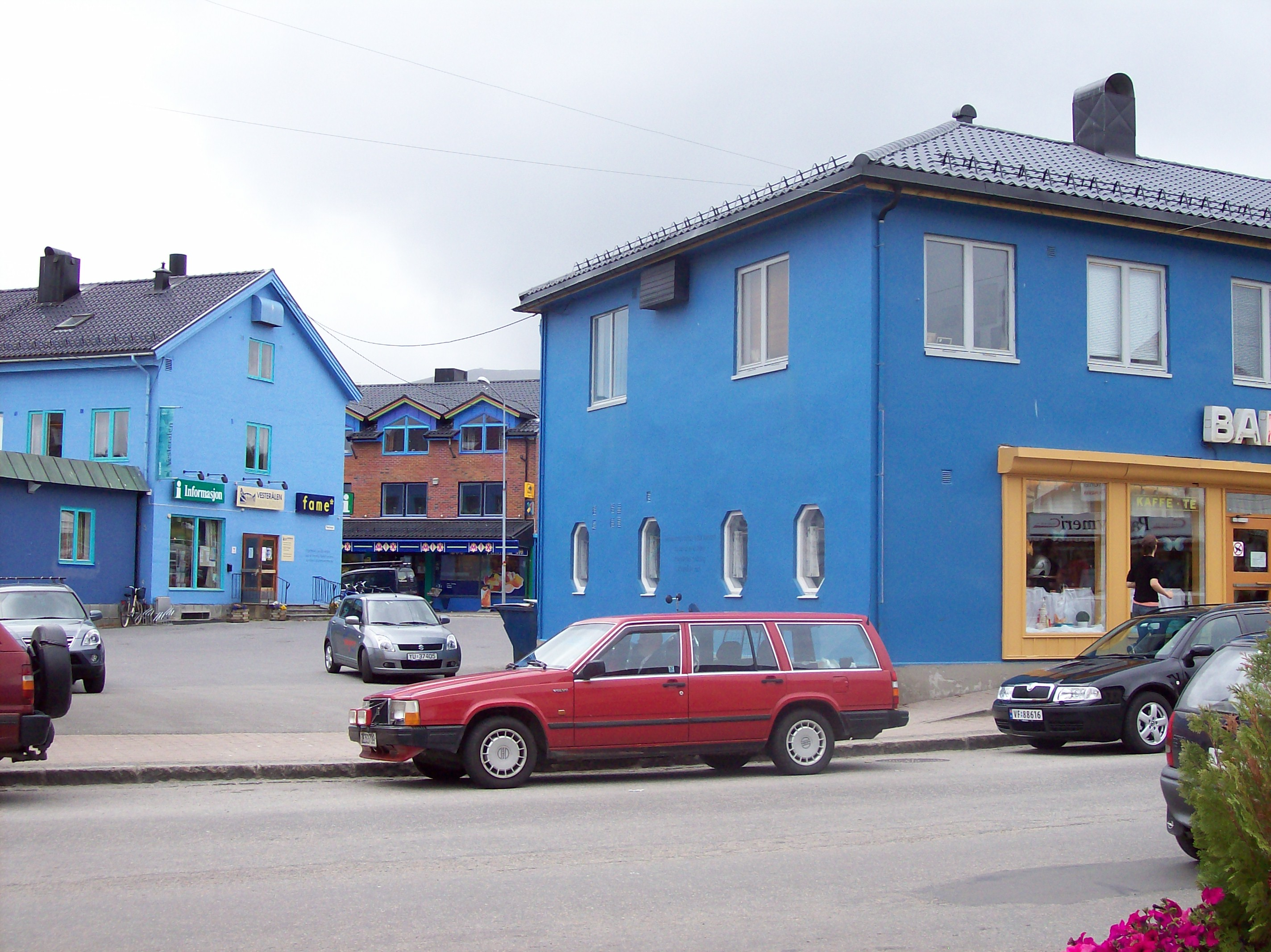

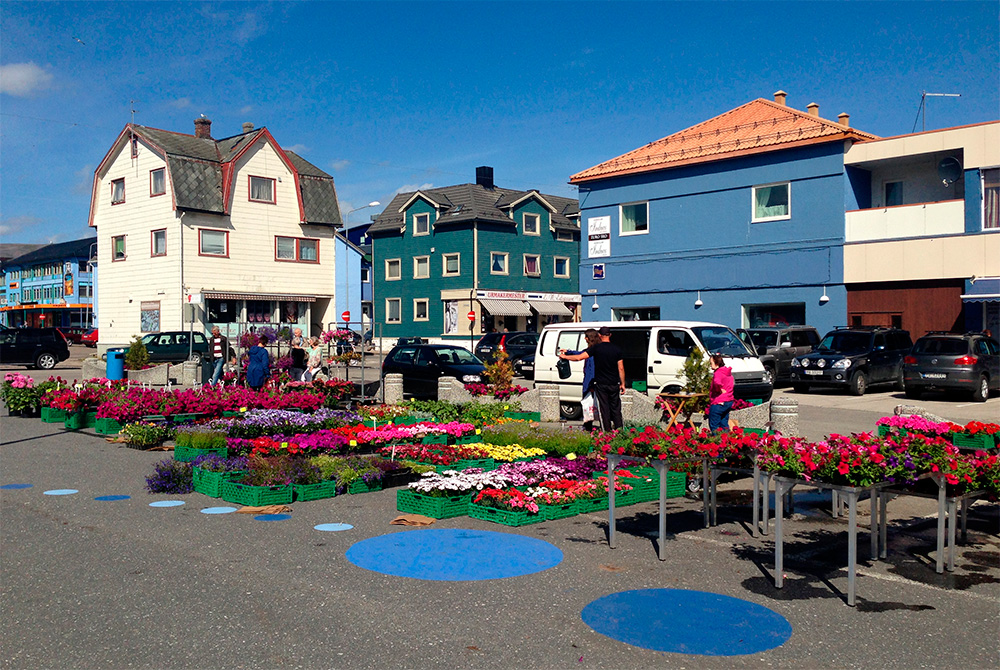

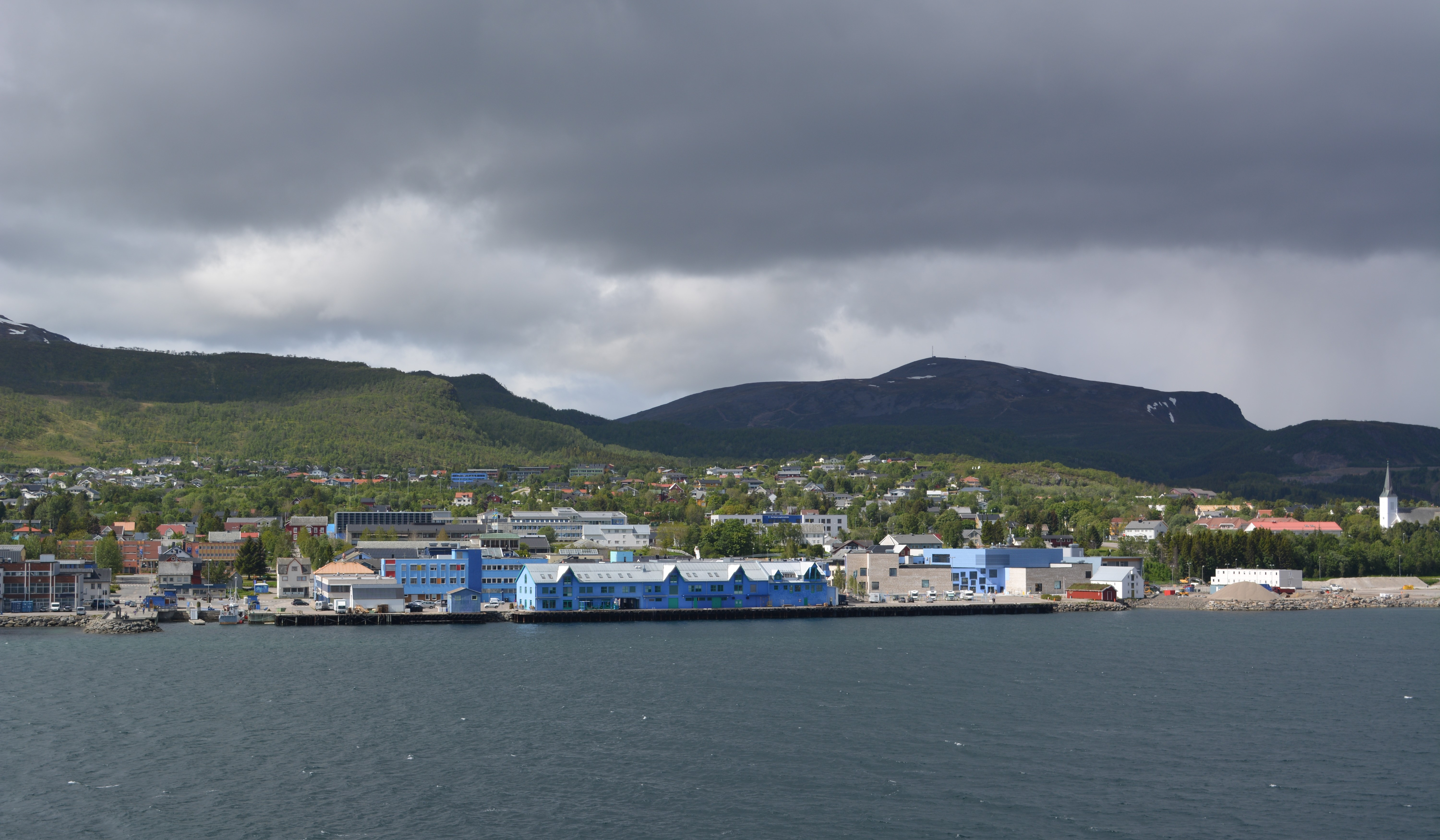

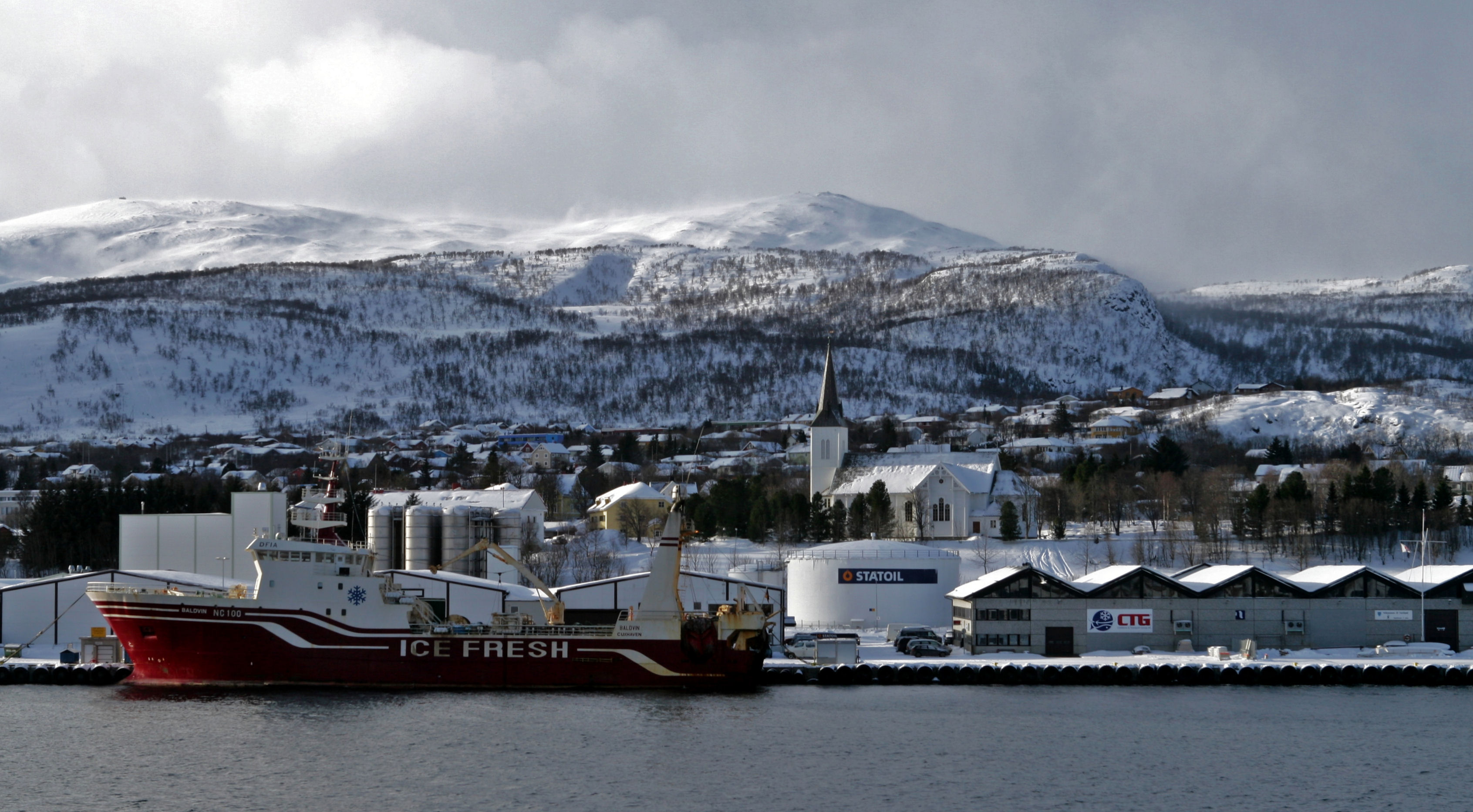

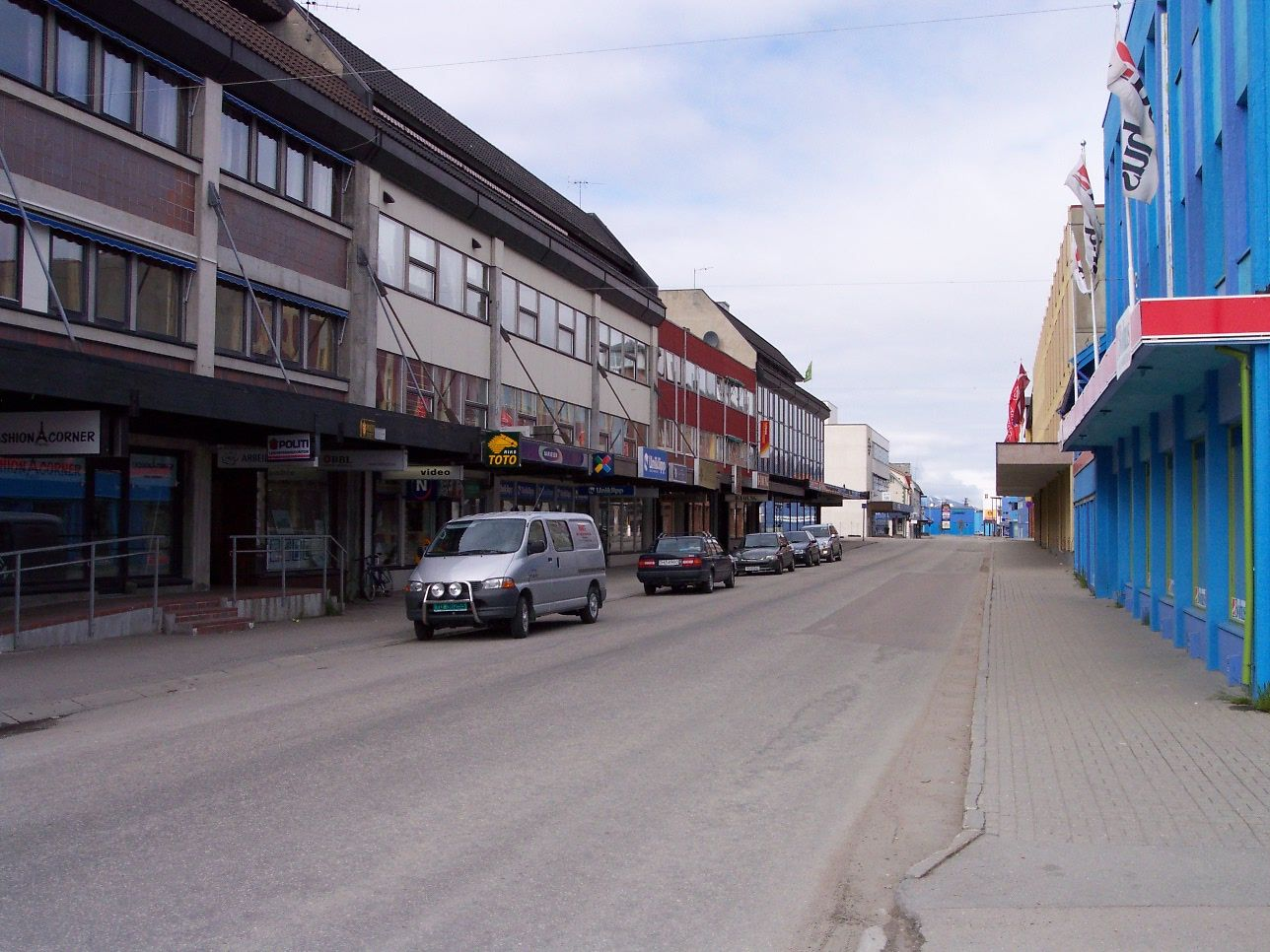

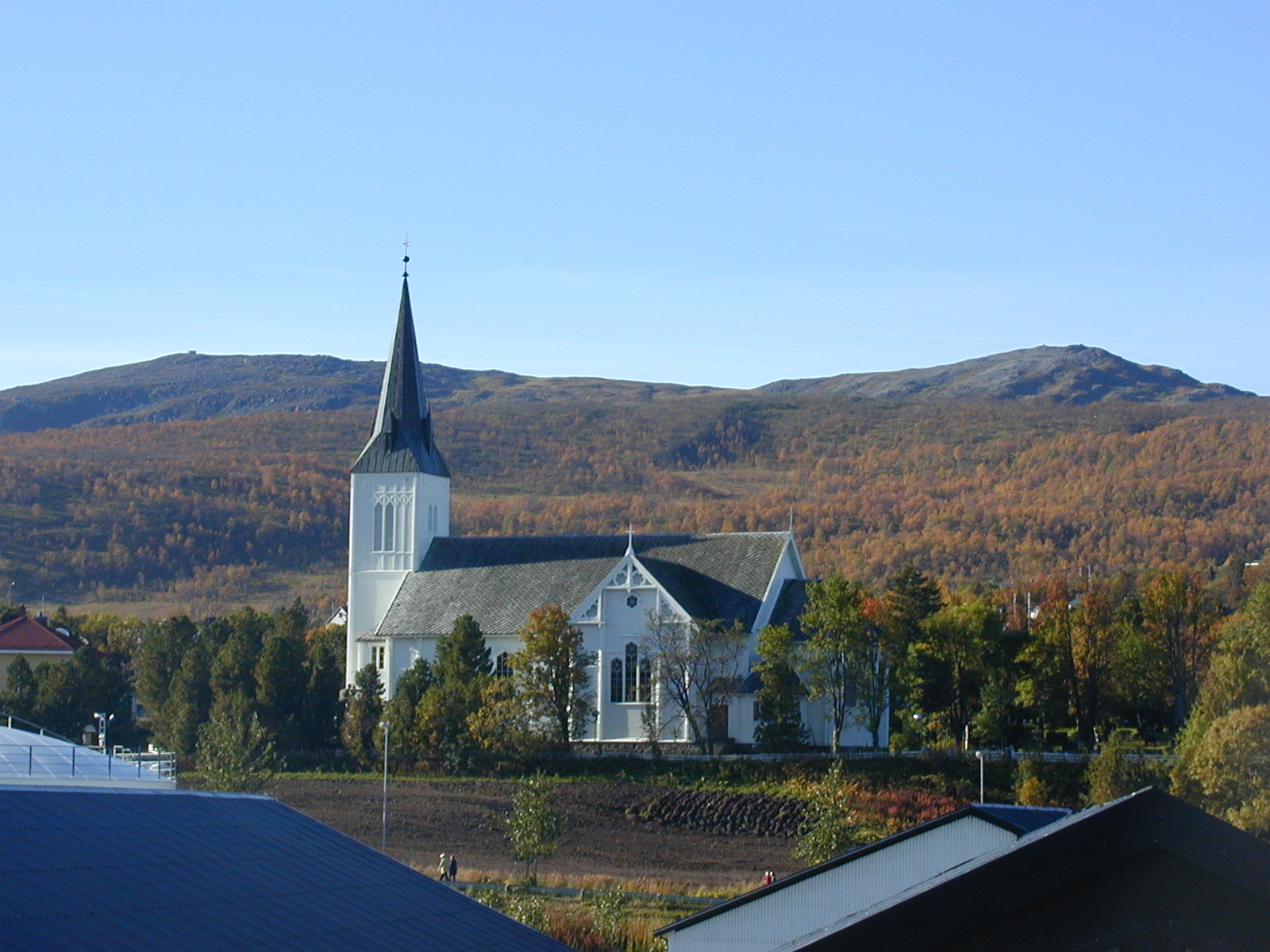

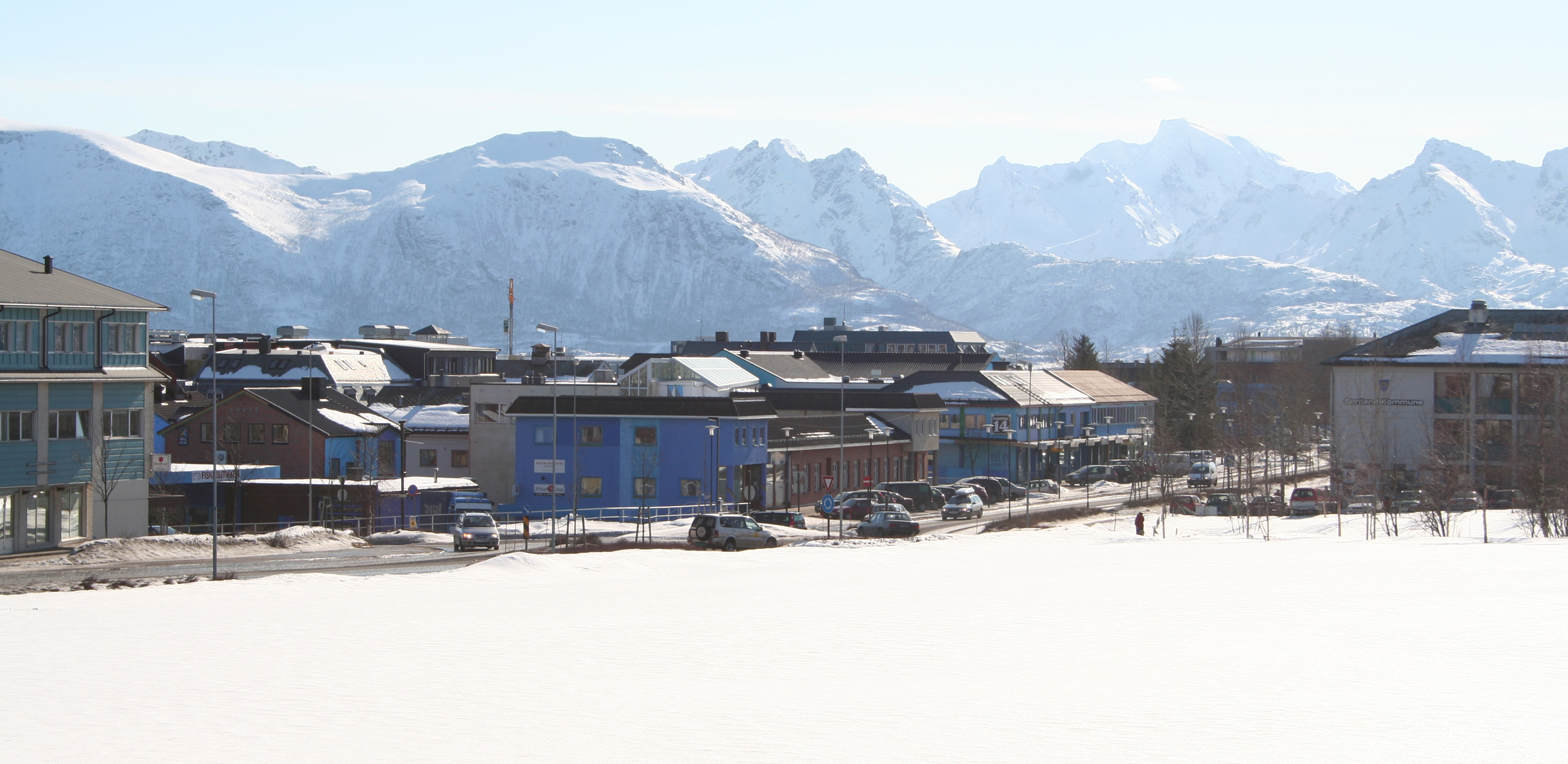

== Climate ==
Climate data for Sortland 1991–2020 (3 m)
Month	Jan	Feb	Mar	Apr	May	Jun	Jul	Aug	Sep	Oct	Nov	Dec	Year
Mean daily maximum °C (°F)	1.8 (35.2)	1.4 (34.5)	2.5 (36.5)	5.5 (41.9)	9.8 (49.6)	12.6 (54.7)	15.7 (60.3)	15.4 (59.7)	12.1 (53.8)	7.3 (45.1)	4.4 (39.9)	2.7 (36.9)	7.7 (45.9)
Daily mean °C (°F)	−0.8 (30.6)	−1.1 (30.0)	−0.2 (31.6)	2.7 (36.9)	6.6 (43.9)	9.7 (49.5)	12.5 (54.5)	12.3 (54.1)	9.3 (48.7)	5.0 (41.0)	2.1 (35.8)	0.2 (32.4)	4.8 (40.6)
Mean daily minimum °C (°F)	−3.4 (25.9)	−3.7 (25.3)	−2.8 (27.0)	−0.1 (31.8)	3.8 (38.8)	7.4 (45.3)	10.2 (50.4)	9.8 (49.6)	6.8 (44.2)	2.6 (36.7)	−0.4 (31.3)	−2.3 (27.9)	2.4 (36.3)
Average precipitation mm (inches)	152.2 (5.99)	138.6 (5.46)	141.2 (5.56)	88.9 (3.50)	65.6 (2.58)	59.1 (2.33)	62.2 (2.45)	76.4 (3.01)	129.2 (5.09)	168.7 (6.64)	139.9 (5.51)	174.2 (6.86)	1,396.2 (54.97)
Source 1: eklima/Norwegian Meteorological Institute
Source 2: NOAA

== See also ==
- List of towns and cities in Norway
