= Kveøya =

Island in Troms, Norway

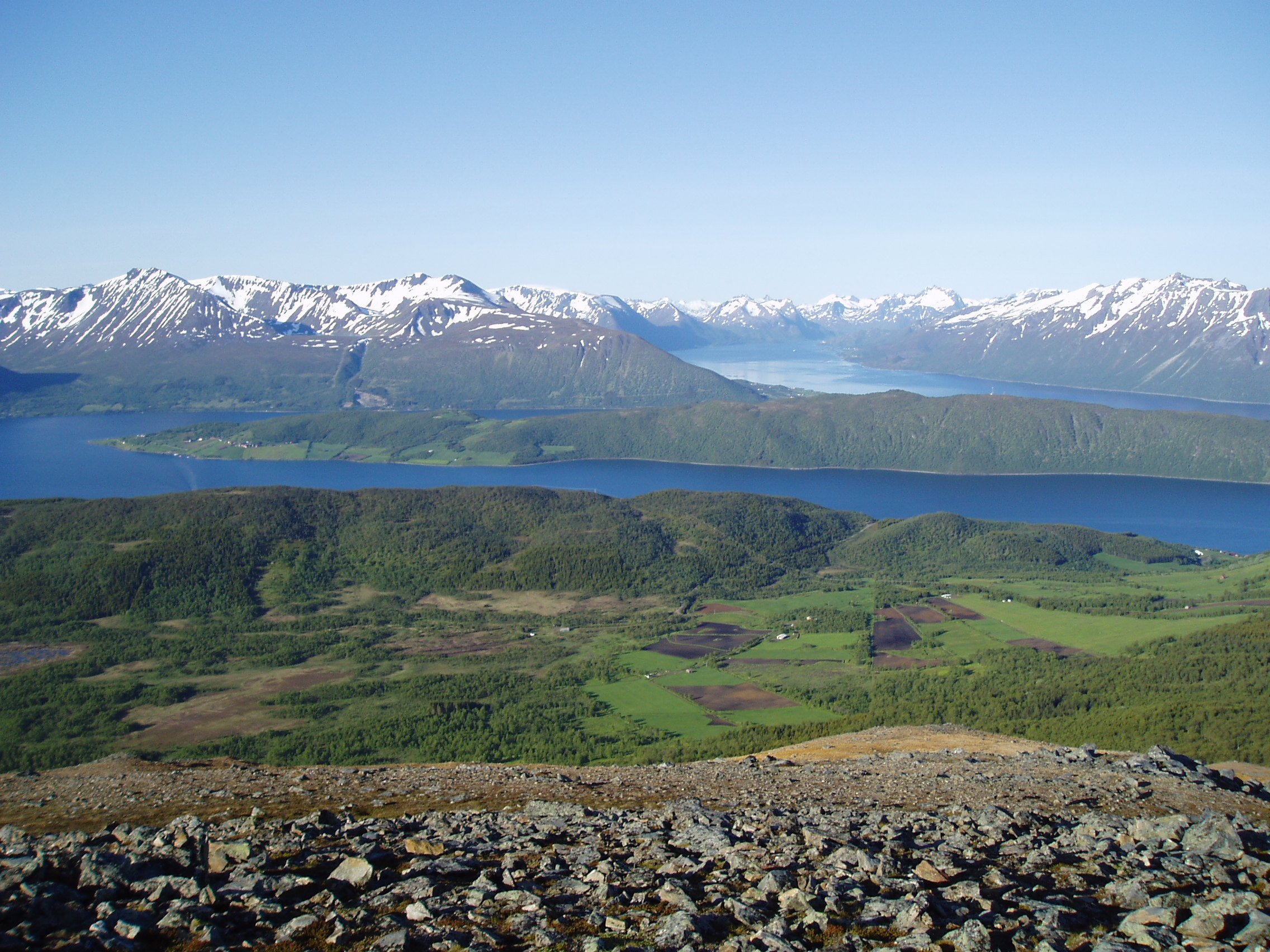
- View of the Kvæfjorden, Kveøya, and Gullesfjorden from the mountain Raudmoldheia
- Interactive map of Kveøya

Geography
- Location: Troms, Norway
- Coordinates: 68.7640°N 16.1096°E
- Area: 7 km^{2} (2.7 sq mi)
- Length: 6 km (3.7 mi)
- Width: 1.5 km (0.93 mi)
- Highest elevation: 267 m (876 ft)
- Highest point: Hilderkleiva

Administration
- Norway
- County: Troms
- Municipality: Kvæfjord Municipality

Kveøya is an island in Kvæfjord Municipality in Troms county, Norway. It is located in the Kvæfjorden, an arm of the Gullesfjorden. The island sits about 1.5 kilometres (0.93 mi) southwest of the village of Borkenes. In 2010, the Kveøy Bridge was completed, connecting the village of Hundstad on the island to a point just west of the village of Straumen on the main island of Hinnøya.

The island is considered as very favorable to farming, with large farms located on southern and western sides. The northern and eastern sides of the island are steep and mountainous. There are no buildings or fertile ground on that part of the island. The highest point on the island is the 267-metre (876 ft) tall Hilderkleiva.

Historically, the island's name was spelled Kvæøya, but in 2017, Kartverket formally changed the spelling to Kveøya.

== See also ==
- List of islands of Norway
