= Langvassbukta =

Village in Kvæfjord Municipality, Norway

- Village
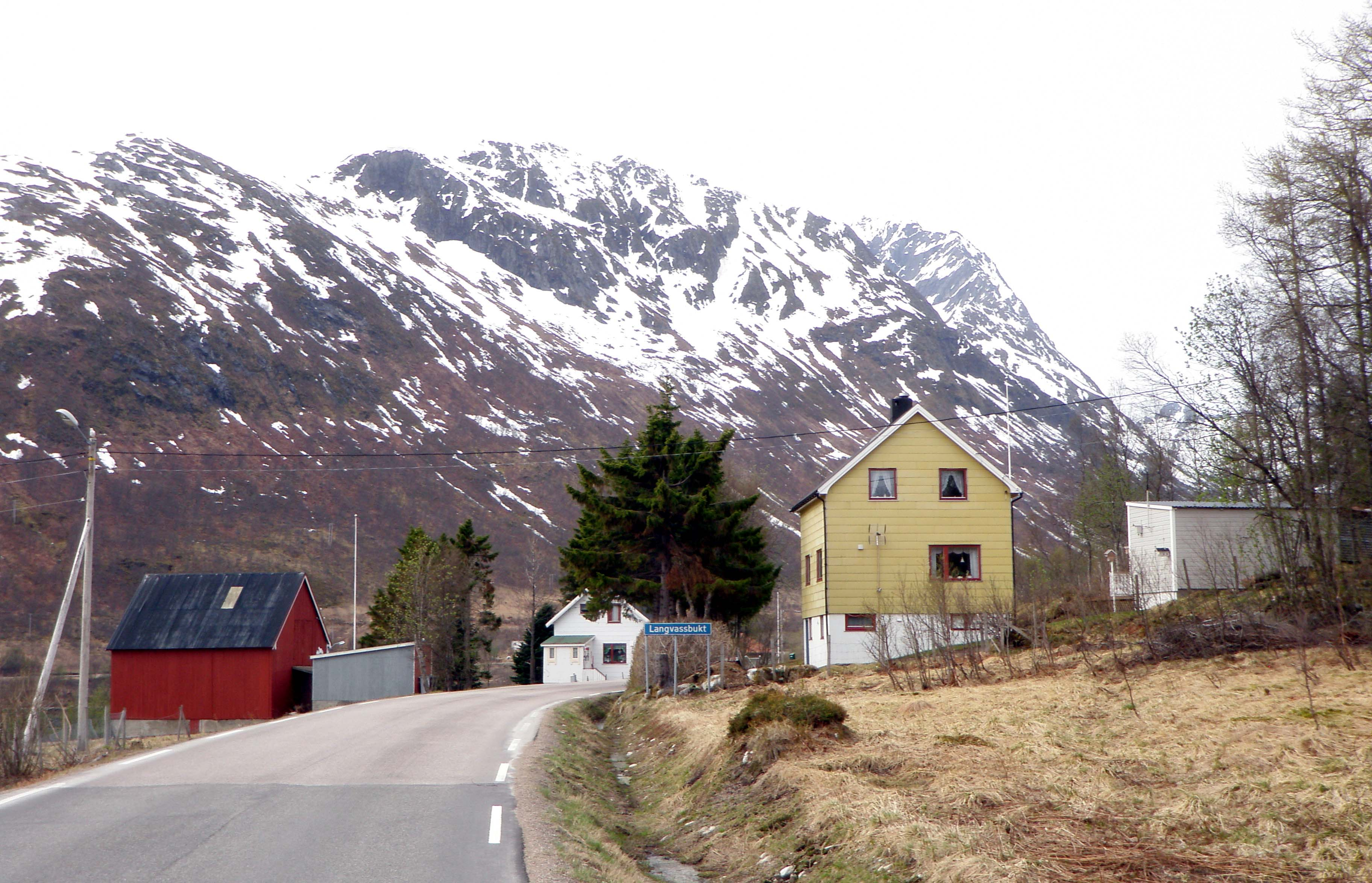
- View of the village
- Interactive map of Langvassbukta
- Location within Troms Location within Norway
- Coordinates: 68°37′04″N 15°45′37″E
- Country: Norway
- Region: Northern Norway
- County: Troms
- District: Central Hålogaland
- Municipality: Kvæfjord Municipality
- Elevation: 26 m (85 ft)
- Time zone: UTC+01:00 (CET)
  - Summer (DST): UTC+02:00 (CEST)
- Post Code: 8409 Gullesfjord

Langvassbukta is a village in Kvæfjord Municipality in Troms county, Norway. The village is located on the west coast of the Gullesfjorden on the large island of Hinnøya. It is located about 20 kilometres (12 mi) southwest of the town of Sortland. Langvassbukt Chapel is located in the village.
