= Langvassbukt Chapel =

- Langvassbukt kapell
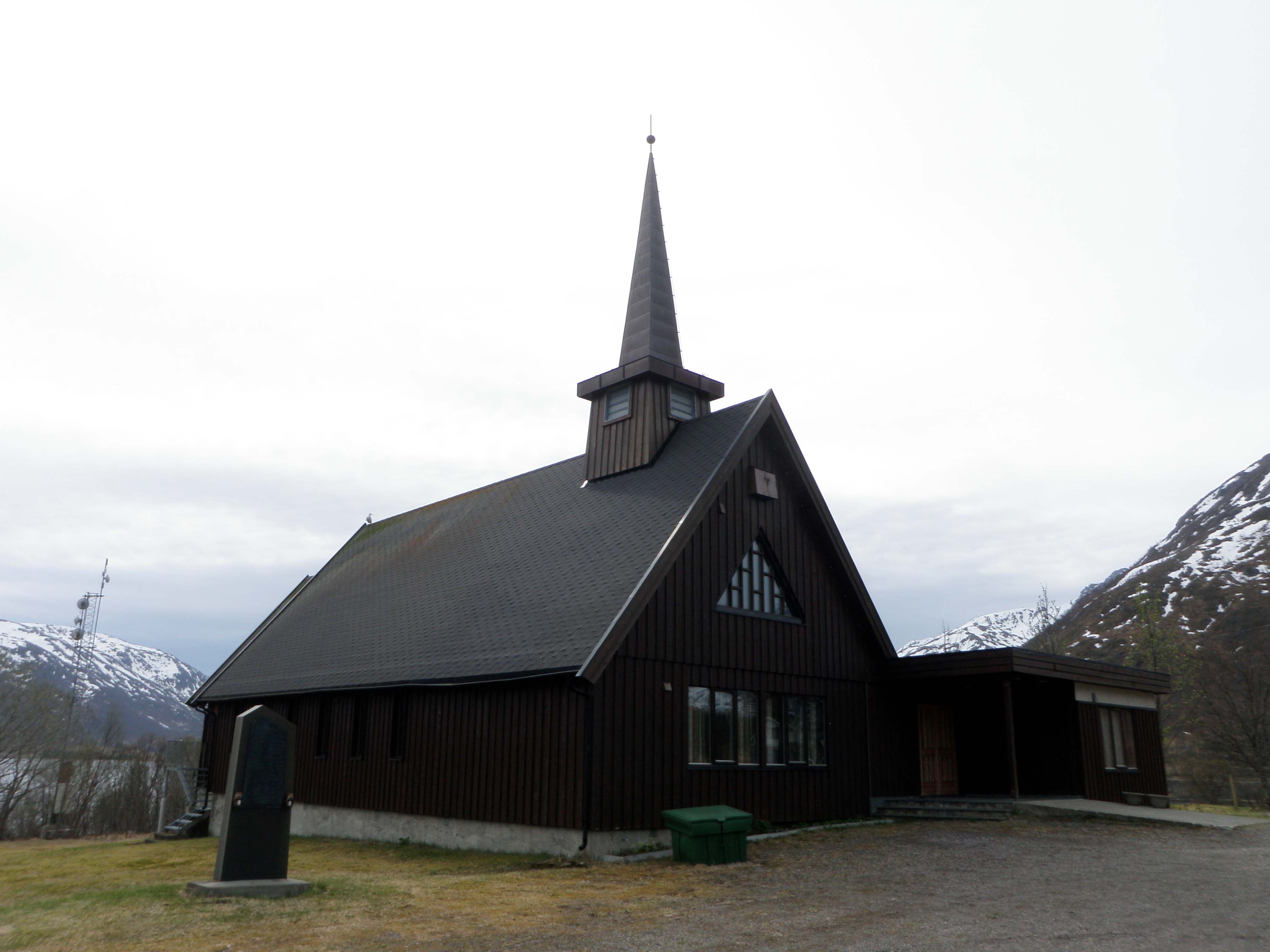
- View of the chapel
- Langvassbukt Chapel
- 68.61945327°N 15.77337437°E
- Location: Kvæfjord Municipality, Troms
- Country: Norway
- Denomination: Church of Norway
- Churchmanship: Evangelical Lutheran

History
- Status: Parish church
- Founded: 1981
- Consecrated: 1981

Architecture
- Functional status: Active
- Completed: 1981 (45 years ago)

Specifications
- Materials: Wood

Administration
- Diocese: Nord-Hålogaland
- Deanery: Trondenes prosti
- Parish: Kvæfjord
- Norwegian Cultural Heritage Site
- Type: Church
- Status: Not protected
- ID: 84906

Langvassbukt Chapel (Norwegian: Langvassbukt kapell) is a chapel of the Church of Norway in Kvæfjord Municipality in Troms county, Norway. It is located in the village of Langvassbukta, along the Gullesfjorden on the island of Hinnøya. It is an annex chapel for the Kvæfjord parish which is part of the Trondenes prosti (deanery) in the Diocese of Nord-Hålogaland. The brown, wooden chapel was built in a long church style in 1981.

== See also ==
- List of churches in Nord-Hålogaland
