= Frederik Christian Winsløw =

Danish surgeon

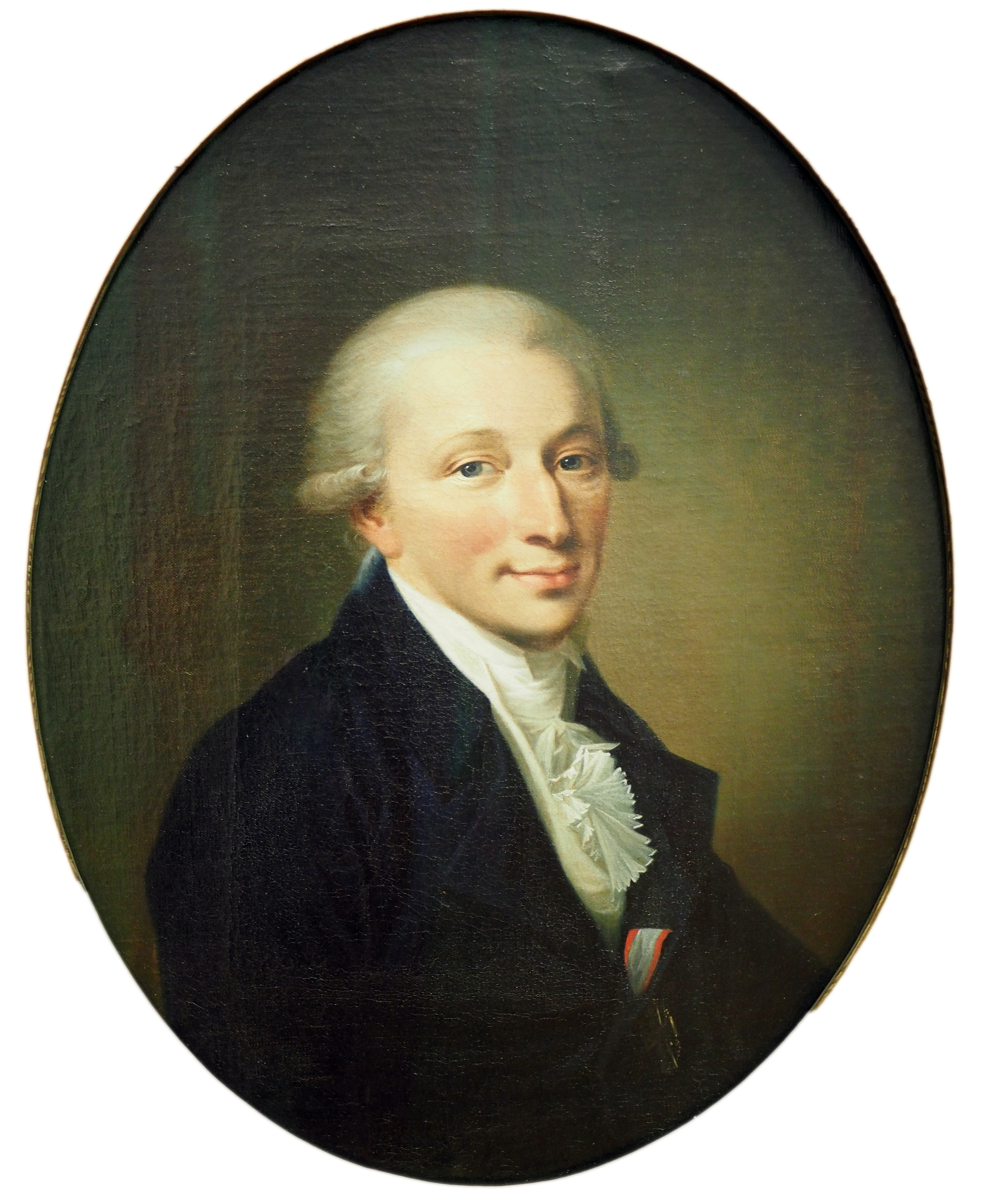
- Winsløw painted by C. A. Lorentzen
- Born: 12 March 1752; Copenhagen, Denmark
- Died: 24 June 1811 (aged 59); Copenhagen, Denmark
- Scientific career
- Fields: Anatomist; Surgeon

Frederik (Friderich) Christian Winsløw (12 March 1752 – 24 June 1811) was a Danish surgeon. He was chief surgeon at Frederick's Hospital from 1781 to 1795, professor of anatomy and surgery at the Royal Danish Academy of Surgery from its foundation in 1785 and was appointed as court surgeon in 1802. He died unmarried and granted most of his estate to the hospital as well as to the associated Fødselsstiftelsen.

== Early life and career ==
Winsløw was born in Copenhagen, the son of medal engraver Peter Christian Winsløw and Anna Dorothea Siewers. In 1756, his father brought him along when he left the country to pursuit a new life in Russia, but left him in Stockholm from where he was returned to his mother in Copenhagen. He served in the household of a maternal uncle from an early age. The uncle, a barber from Christianshavn, taught him the trade of surgery. At the age of 14 he also began to receive training at Frederick's Hospital where chief surgeon Alexander Kølpin "accustomed his ear, heart and hand to the surgical profession." He also began to follow Heinrich Callisen's lectures at the Theatrum Anatomico-chirurgicum and was trained in dissection by Georg Heuermann. He also followed the lectures of V. Hennings and Johan Clemens Tode.

In 1769, the anatomist and botanist Christen Friis Rottbøll made the hard-working and ambitious seventeen-year-old student his prosector and later that same year he was appointed to army company surgeon. Callisen now saw to his further education at the Theatrum Anatomico-chirurgicum and after his return to Denmark from a journey abroad in 1771 secured him a position as assistant surgeon at the søkvæsthuset. That same year he also enrolled at the University of Copenhagen where he, in 1773, became prosector and began to lecture.

From 1774 to 1777, Winsløw served as surgeon at Frederick's Hospital, first under Kølpin, and then under J. E. Behrens.

== Travels ==
In 1777, assisted by royal physician J. C. J. v. Berger, who was a member of the hospital's board of directors, Winsløw obtained a royal travel stipend. He initially went to Paris where the memory of his relative, the anatomist Jacob B. Winslow, was still alive and opened all doors. He mainly studied under Pierre-Joseph Desault but also under Raphaël Bienvenu Sabatier and Jean-Louis Baudelocque. From Paris he continued to London where he mainly studied under William and John Hunter.

== Chief surgeon and professor ==
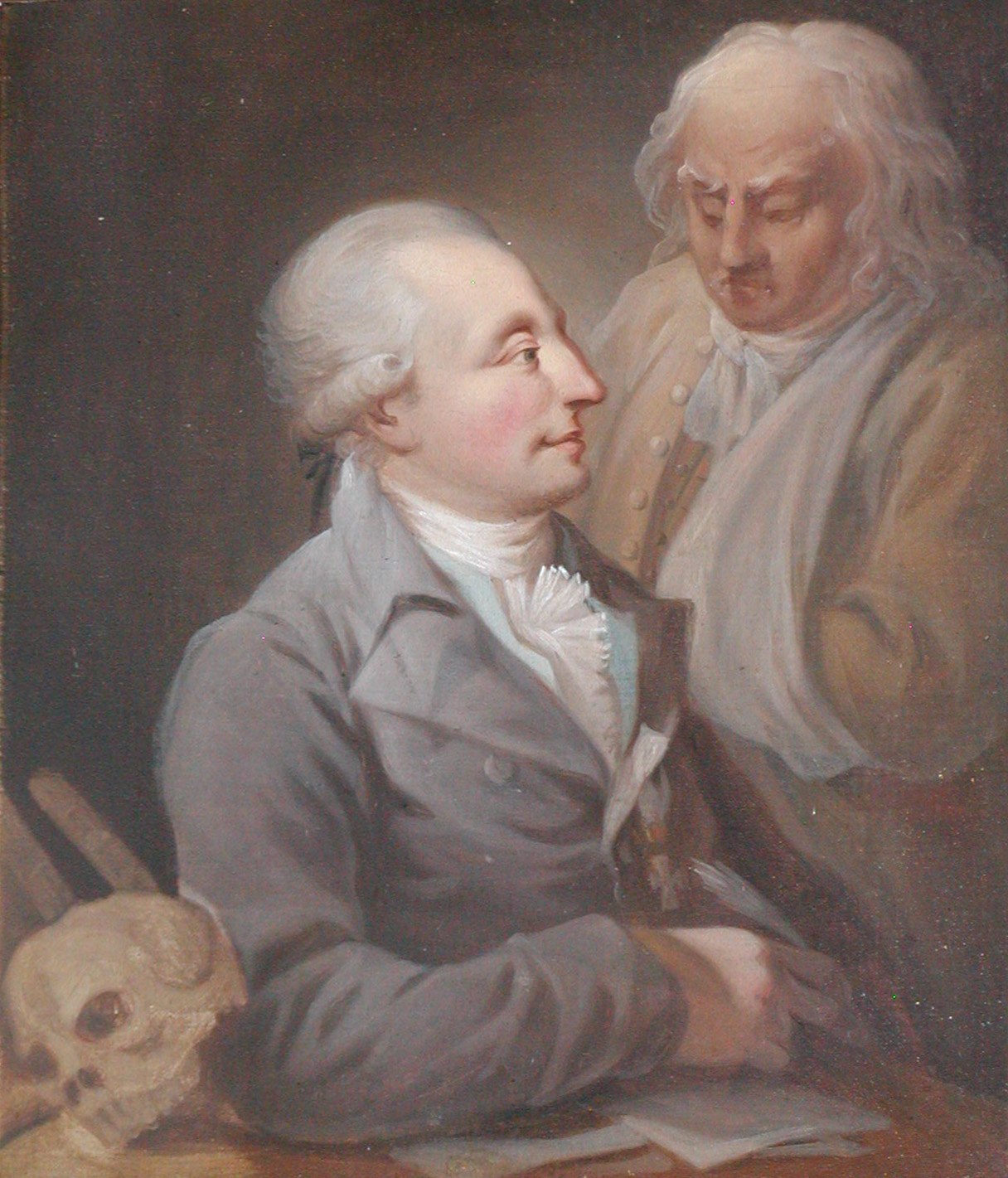
Frederik Christian Winsløw

Winsløw returned to Denmark in 1780 and succeeded Behrens as head surgeon at Frederick's Hospital the following year. He represented the surgeons in the gfeud against the physicians with Callisen as his direct opponent. He was appointed to professor of anatomy and surgery when the Royal Danish Academy of Surgery was founded in the 1785. He also operated a lucrative private practice.

He was succeeded by H. C. F. Schumacher in 1795 but remained active at the Royal Danish Academy of Surgery. He was the first in the country to hold weekly clinical-surgical lectures.

== Work ==
Winsløw's few written works from his early career are insignificant. His observations during the dissection of cats and dog of respiratory movements of fetuses intra ovum enabled P. Scheels to write his thesis on this subject. Inspired by his time in London, he was active in the debate on vaccinations. In 1801 he made the first successful Cowpox vaccinations in the country, using lymph acquired directly from Edward Jenner. He was later an active member of the Vaccination Commission.

During the siege and bombardment of Copenhagen, Winsløw was responsible for organizing the lazarets and personally acted as head surgeon at one of them. He was appointed as court surgeon in 1801. He became a member of the new sundhedskollegium as well as of the Royal Medical Society in 1803.

== Personal life ==
Winsløw never married. His ability to work was inhibited by increasing problems with dropsy during the lat years of his life which ultimately caused his death. He left most of his estate to Frederick's Hospital and Fødselsstiftelsen. One of the apartments in Gammel kloster was named F. C.Winsløw's Apartment after him.
