= Kvæfjord =

Kvæfjord may refer to:

== Places ==
- Kvæfjord Municipality, a municipality in Troms county, Norway
- Kvæfjorden, a fjord in Troms and Nordland counties in Norway
- Kvæfjord Church, a church in Kvæfjord Municipality in Troms county, Norway

== Other ==
- Kvæfjord cake, a Norwegian cake sometimes referred to as the national cake of Norway
