= Aagesen =

Aagesen (or Aggesen) is a Danish and Norwegian surname. Notable people with the surname include:

- Andreas Aagesen (1826–1879), Danish jurist and politician
- Astrid Aagesen (1883–1965), Danish-Swedish designer
- Fritz Aagesen (1935–1998), Norwegian writer
- Karin Ågesen, Danish orienteer
- Sara Aagesen (born 1976), Spanish politician and chemical engineer
- Sven Aggesen (c. 1140 to 1150 – ?), Danish historian
- Truid Aagesen (fl. 1593–1625), Danish composer
