= Borkenes =

Village in Kvæfjord Municipality, Norway

- Village
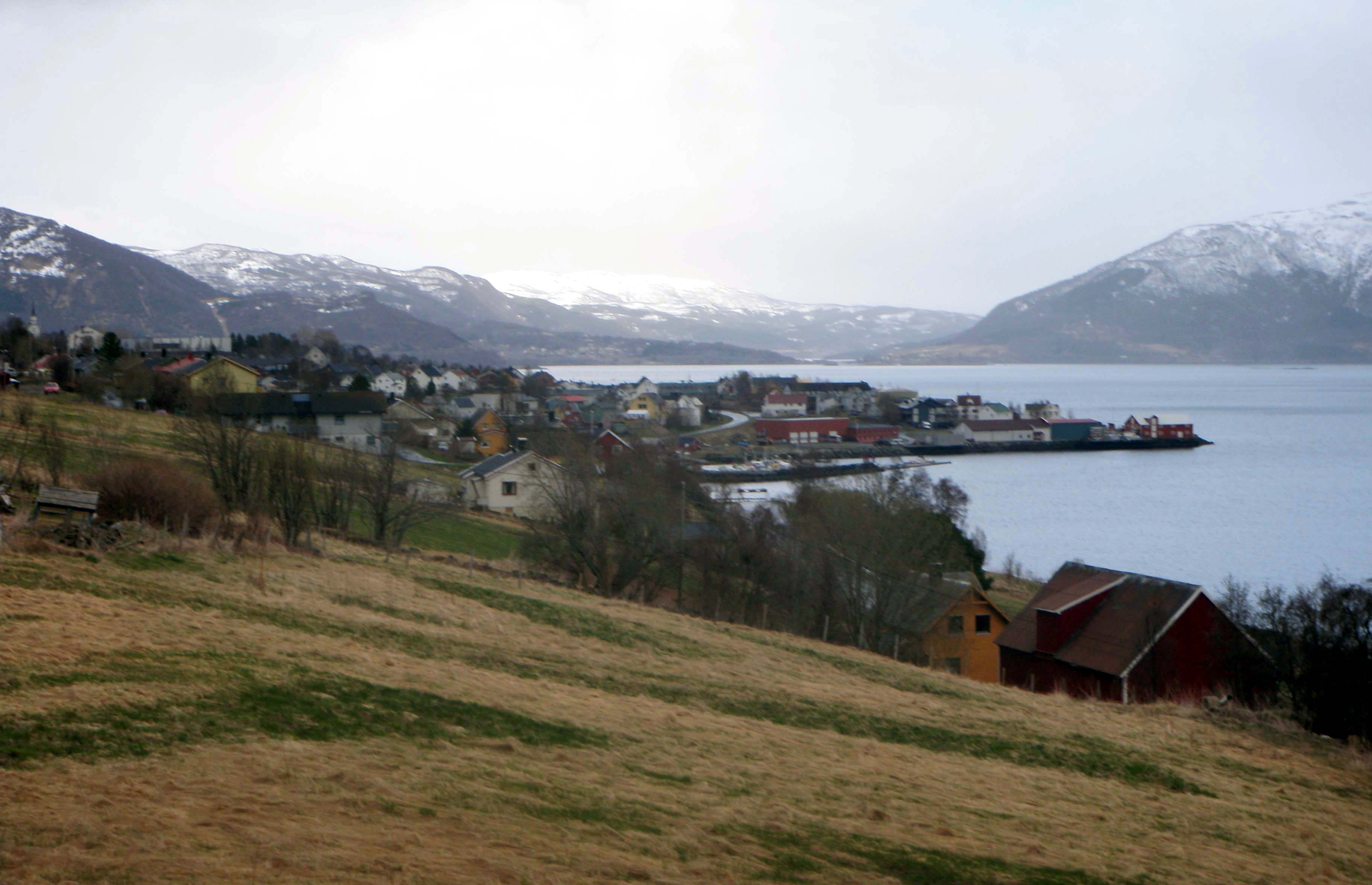
- View of the village in May
- Interactive map of Borkenes
- Location within Troms Location within Norway
- Coordinates: 68°46′26″N 16°10′26″E
- Country: Norway
- Region: Northern Norway
- County: Troms
- District: Central Hålogaland
- Municipality: Kvæfjord Municipality

Area
  - Total: 1.14 km^{2} (0.44 sq mi)
- Elevation: 29 m (95 ft)

Population (2023)
  - Total: 1,513
  - Density: 1,327/km^{2} (3,440/sq mi)
- Time zone: UTC+01:00 (CET)
  - Summer (DST): UTC+02:00 (CEST)
- Post Code: 9475 Borkenes

Borkenes is the administrative centre of Kvæfjord Municipality in Troms county, Norway. The farming village is located on the island of Hinnøya, about 18 kilometres (11 mi) west of the city of Harstad. It is located along the Kvæfjorden (an arm of the Gullesfjorden), looking across the fjord at the island of Kvæøya.

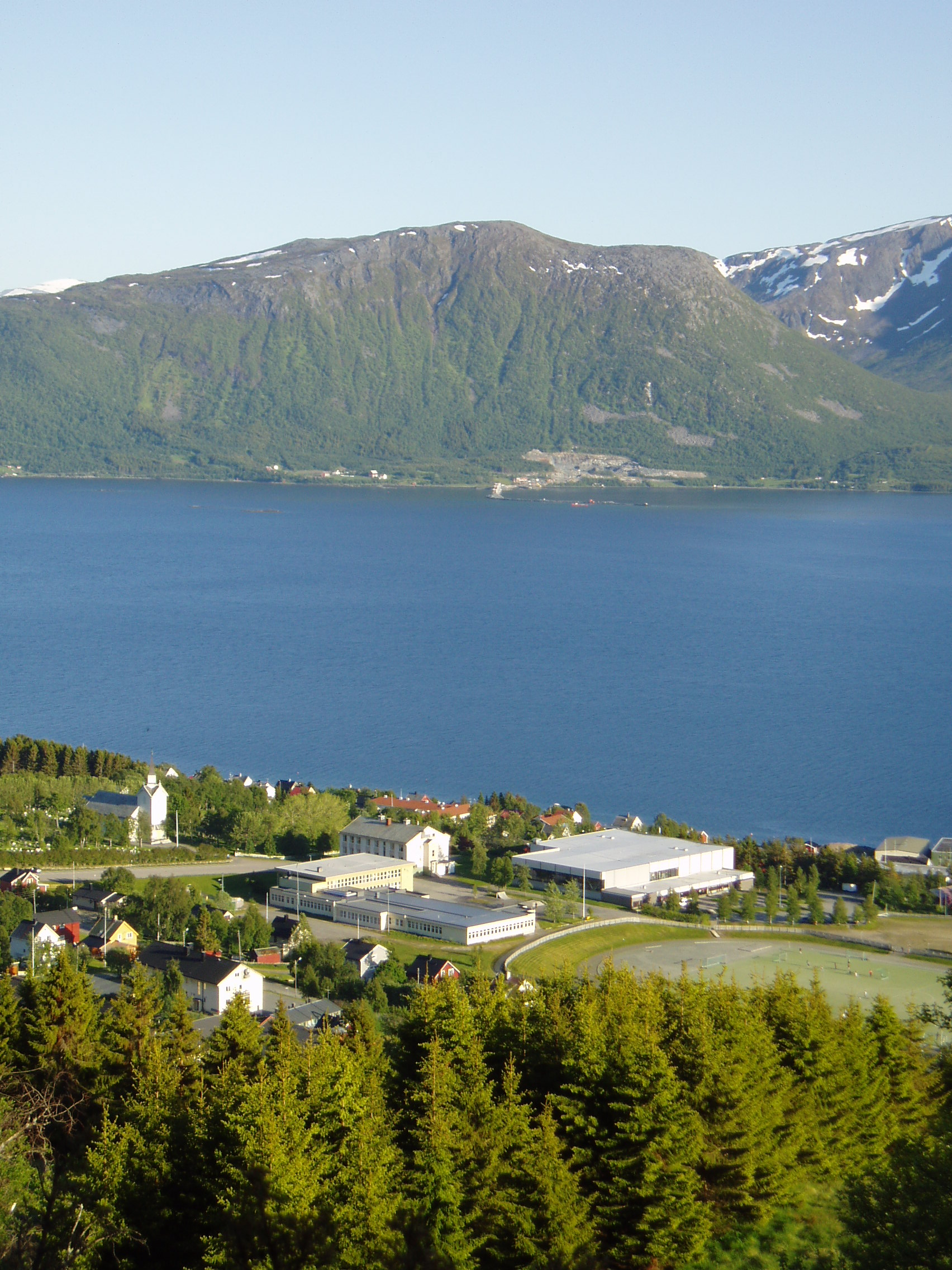
View of Borkenes

Kvæfjord Church is located in the village centre near the local school. The village is built along the small river Råelva. The 1.14-square-kilometre (280-acre) village has a population (2023) of 1,513 and a population density of 1,327 inhabitants per square kilometre (3,440/sq mi).

== Economy ==
Earlier, Borkenes was an industrial center with the production of herring oil as the main industry. Later the center for people with mental retardation at Trastad, in the northwestern part of Borkenes became a principal industry for the village. In the 1990s, the government decided to close all institutions of this scale. People who had been living there for many years could choose to move home or continue living in new housing at Borkenes. Many stayed on, and working with mentally disabled people continues to be a viable employment opportunity in the community.

Today, the village is home to a horticultural school which is part of the Rå videregående skole (high school). There is some agriculture in the area, where strawberries and potatoes are grown by local farmers. Wildlife and fishing are available in the mountains and lakes close to residential areas, and boats are available for sea excursions.
