= Kvæfjord Church =

- Kvæfjord kirke
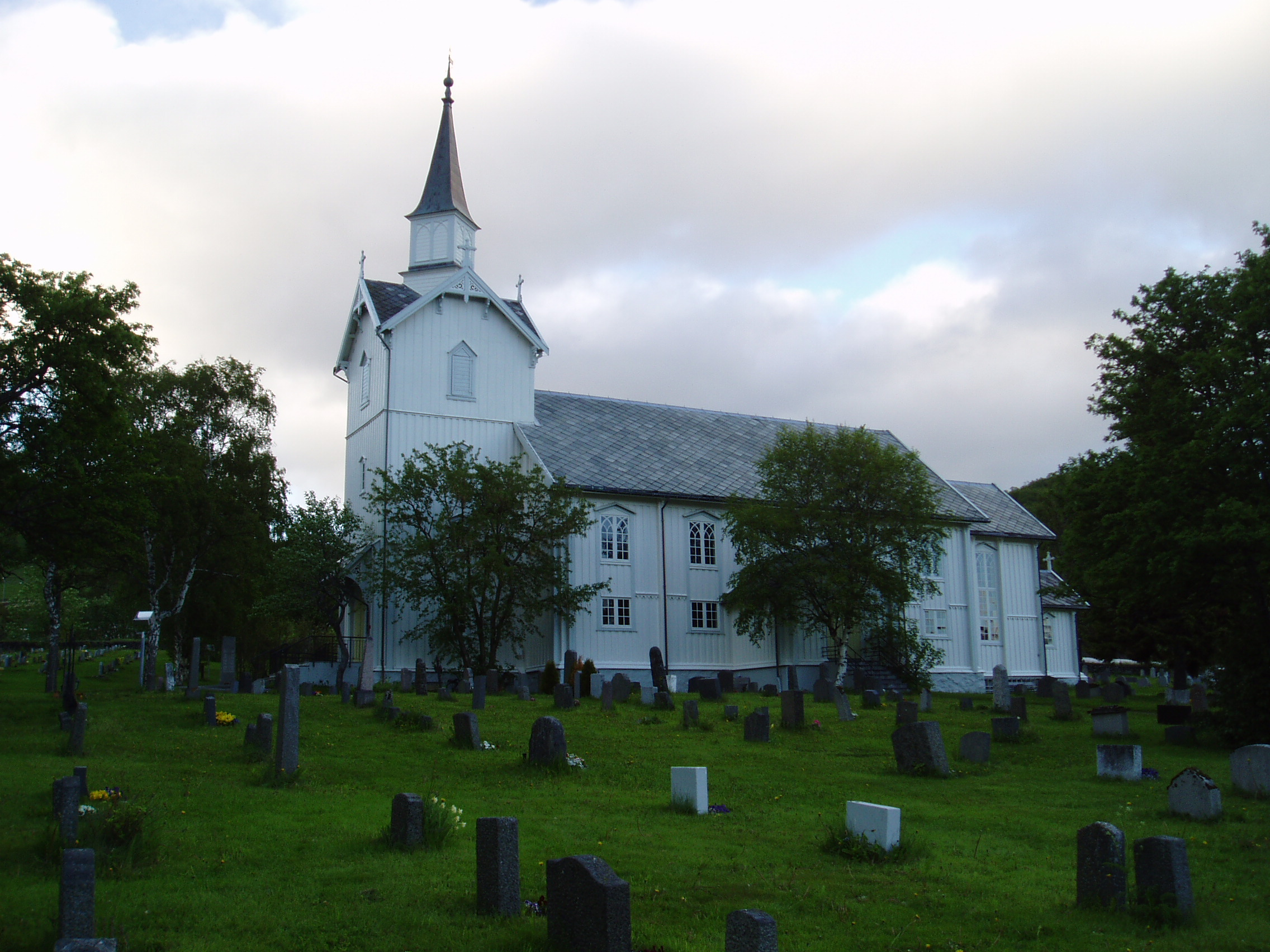
- View of the church
- Kvæfjord Church
- 68.7726745°N 16.1828881°E
- Location: Kvæfjord Municipality, Troms
- Country: Norway
- Denomination: Church of Norway
- Churchmanship: Evangelical Lutheran

History
- Status: Parish church
- Founded: 13th century
- Consecrated: 30 July 1867

Architecture
- Functional status: Active
- Architect: Jacob Wilhelm Nordan
- Architectural type: Long church
- Style: Neo-Gothic
- Completed: 1867 (159 years ago)

Specifications
- Capacity: 550
- Materials: Wood

Administration
- Diocese: Nord-Hålogaland
- Deanery: Trondenes prosti
- Parish: Kvæfjord
- Norwegian Cultural Heritage Site
- Type: Church
- Status: Listed
- ID: 84873

Kvæfjord Church (Norwegian: Kvæfjord kirke) is a parish church of the Church of Norway in Kvæfjord Municipality in Troms county, Norway. It is located in the village of Borkenes on the island of Hinnøya. It is the main church for the Kvæfjord parish which is part of the Trondenes prosti (deanery) in the Diocese of Nord-Hålogaland. The white, wooden, neo-Gothic church was built in a long church style in 1867 using plans drawn up by the architect Jacob Wilhelm Nordan. The church seats about 550 people. The building was consecrated on 30 July 1867.

== History ==
The earliest existing historical records of the church date back to the year 1350, but the church was likely built around the year 1250. It is not known how many buildings stood on the site over the centuries, but in 1750, the Bishop Frederik Nannestad wrote that the Kvæfjord Church was a red, wooden, cruciform church. In 1764-1765 the old church was torn down and a new church was built on the same site. It was a timber-framed church in a cruciform design. It had a small tower over the central part of the building with an extended choir and sacristy in the east.

In 1814, this church served as an election church (Norwegian: valgkirke). Together with more than 300 other parish churches across Norway, it was a polling station for elections to the 1814 Norwegian Constituent Assembly which wrote the Constitution of Norway. This was Norway's first national elections. Each church parish was a constituency that elected people called "electors" who later met together in each county to elect the representatives for the assembly that was to meet at Eidsvoll Manor later that year.

That church only lasted about 120 years before it was too small for the parish, so in 1866-1867 it was torn down and replaced with the present church. The cost for the new church was 5,565 speciedaler, 1 ort, and 10 skilling. The new building was a long church with a narrower, rectangular choir and sacristy built to the east, as well as a tower next to the nave to the west.

== See also ==
- List of churches in Nord-Hålogaland
