= Nupen =

Mountain in Troms, Norway

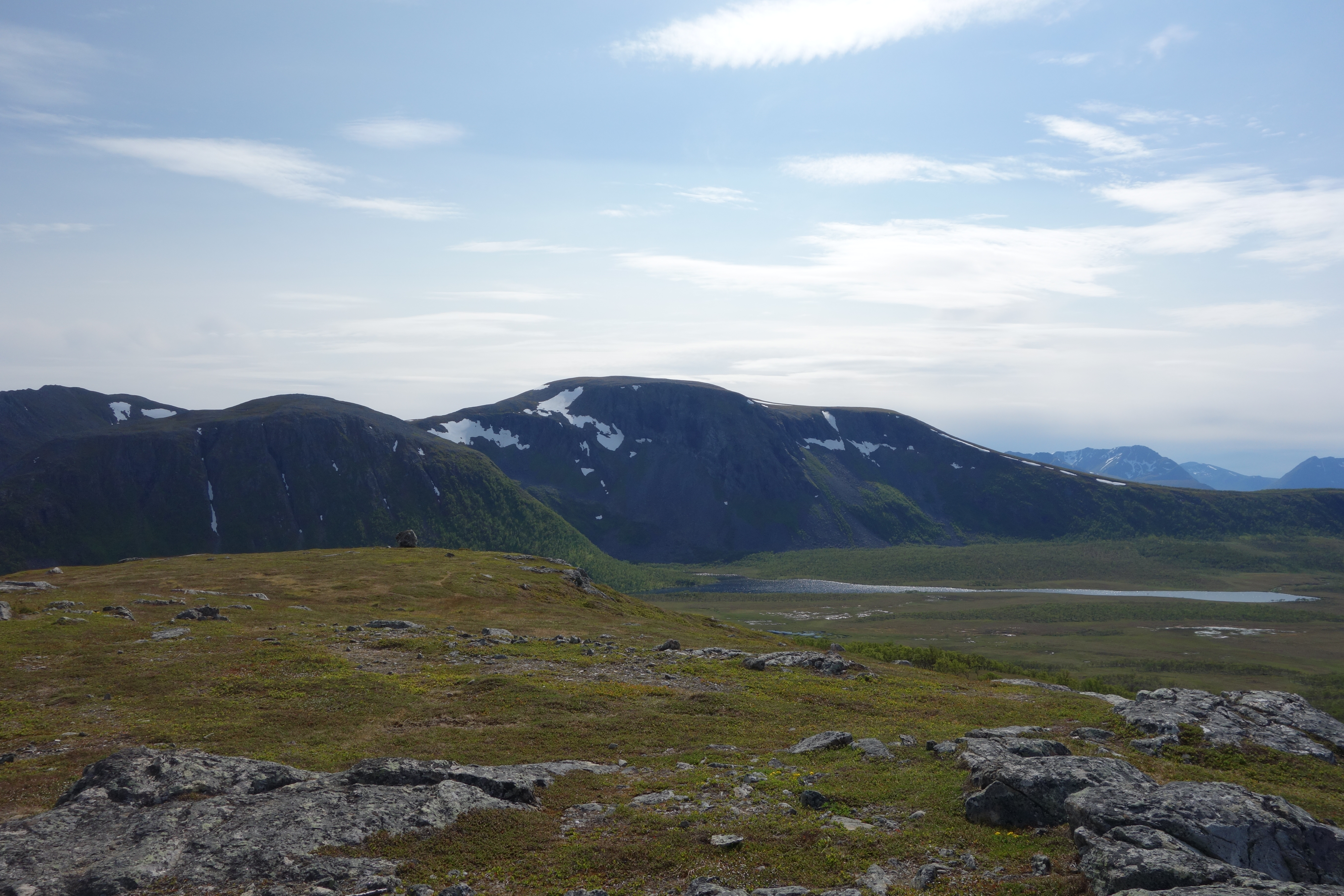
- View of mountain Storhornet from Nupen

Highest point
- Elevation: 412 m (1,352 ft)
- Prominence: 412 m (1,352 ft)
- Coordinates: 68.8522°N 16.2483°E

Geography
- Interactive map of the mountain
- Location: Troms, Norway

Nupen is a small mountain in Troms county, Norway. The 412-metre (1,352 ft) tall mountain lies on the border of Kvæfjord Municipality and Harstad Municipality, about 13 kilometres (8.1 mi) west of the town of Harstad. The peak of the mountain is in Harstad, but the mountain itself straddles the municipal border. The village of Bremnes lies just west of the mountain in Kvæfjord and the Andfjorden lies to the north. The mountain is known for its view of the midnight sun.
