= Hjorte Apotek (Copenhagen) =

Pharmacy in Copenhagen, Denmark

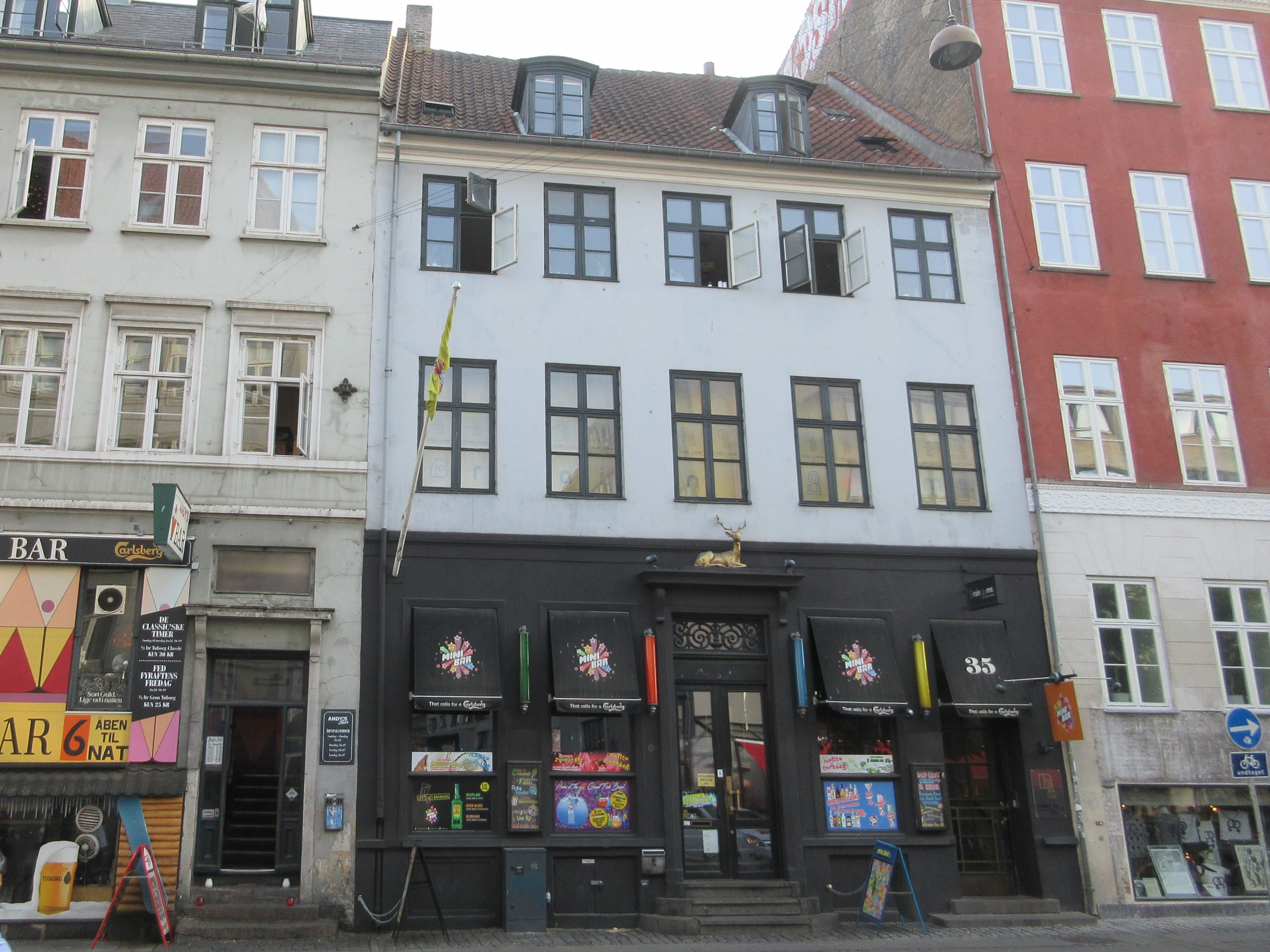
- Vesterbro Pharmacy

General information
- Architectural style: Neoclassical
- Location: Copenhagen, Denmark
- Coordinates: 55°40′55.85″N 12°33′55.76″E
- Completed: 1801

Hjorte Apotek was a pharmacy located at Gothersgade 35 in central Copenhagen, Denmark. It opened in 1800 and closed in 1967. The building was listed on the Danish registry of protected buildings and places in 1964.

== History ==
=== Site history, 1646–1800 ===
The first private owner of the site was Anne Bentzwinger, widow of master smith at Holmen Anders Bentzwinger. In 1646, she was granted a larger piece of land on the site as replacement for her "garden and demolished buildings outside the city's Northern City Gate". Six years later, she expanded the property eastwards through the acquisition of an extra strip of land when Ny Kongensgade (now Gothersgade) was constructed. The first buildings were constructed not long thereafter.

In the mid-1750s, the entire property was acquired by the three siblings Hans, Susanne and Wilchen Ribolt. Wilchen Ribolt was court painter. He had decorated part of nearby Rosenborg Castle and painted a number of portrait paintings of members of the royal family. He was already the owner of a property on the south side of Store Regnegade. The property was listed in Copenhagen's first cadastre of 1689 as No. 173 in the Købmager Quarter. Shortly after the turn of the century, Wilchen Ribolt divided the land into smaller properties. He kept a property in Gothersgade (FG). He had already constructed a house for his own use at the corner with Store Regnegade (litra F). Most of the building was let out to the widow Anne Maria Heidemann.

Wilchen Ribolt died during the 1711 outbreak of plague in Copenhagen. His widow married the surgeon Martin Labes. In 1825, he sold Litra G (later No. 138/1755 eller 336/1806) to stadsadjudant and captain Claus Barfoed.

Barfoed completed a house on the northern part of his new property in 1728. The southern part was left as garden. It house was a seven bays wide, two-storey brick building with a full basement. The facade was crowned by a three-bay gabled wall dormer. A six bays long, three-storey, half-timbered side wing projected from the rear side of the building. The facade of the side wing was also crowned by a three-bay gabled wall dormer. The ground floor contained stables. Finally, there was a nine-bay rear wing, also of half-timbered construction in three storeys with monopitched roof and also a three-bay gable. In total, there were nine iron stoves in the complex, and pumped water was installed.

He lived there with his wife, children, three male servants and three maids. The basement was let out to grocer (høker) Olluf Pedersen.

The building just escaped the Copenhagen Fire of 1728. This was only possible because the neighbouring houses were demolished. After the fire, fire insurance became mandatory for all property owners.

In 1746, Barfoed sold the property to one "ribbon manufacturer Perret". In 1752–1753, it was occupied by carpenter Jacob Larsen but it is not clear weather he owned it or merely lived there as a tenant.

In June 1753, the property was acquired by supercargo Lyder Schilderup. In 1758 the basement was let out to Johan Kegel. Schilderup's property was listed in the new cadastre of 1756 as No. 138 in Købmager Quarter.

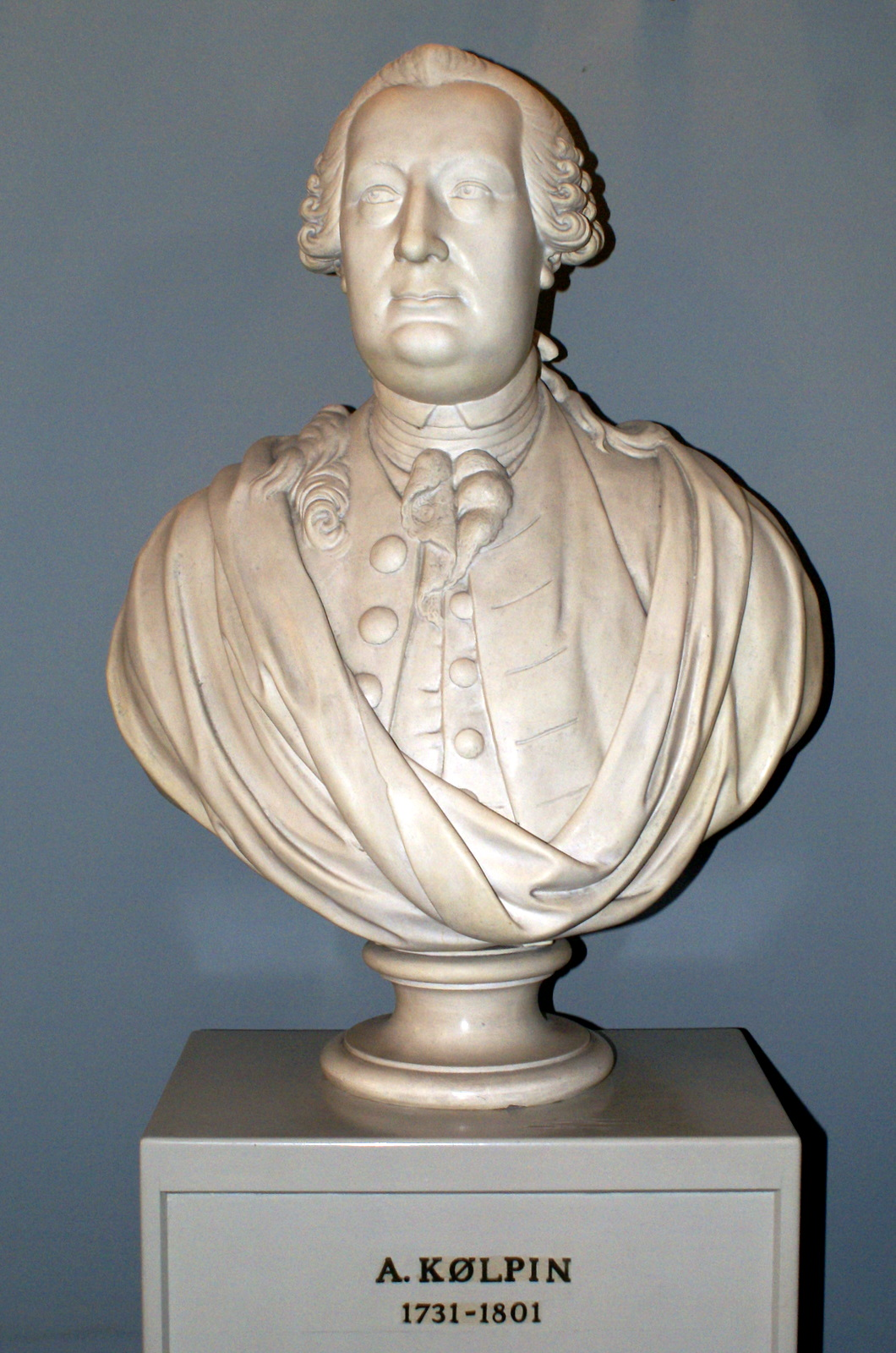
Alexander Kølpin, surgeon

At the time of the 1787 census, No. 138 was home to two households. Alexander Kølpin (1731–1801), a professor at the Royal Academy of Surgery, resided in the building with his housekeeper Anne Sotmann, the surgery amanuensis Johan Heinrich Christian Feldtman, the military surgeon Johan Friedrich Feldtman, a maid, a coachman and a caretaker. Jacob Friedrich Schlaffer, a tea merchant, resided in the building with his wife Elisabeth Magdalene NN, their nine-year-old foster son Peter Hofman, the maid Kirstine Jacobsdatter and the 71-year-old lodger Melchior Johan von Witten.

=== The pharmacy, 1800–1967 ===
On 27 December 1799, Nicolaj Tychsen (1751–804) was granted a royal license to open a pharmacy on Gothersgade in Copenhagen. His new building at No. 35 was not completed until 1801 but the pharmacy already opened in 1800.

At the time of the 1801 census, No. 138 was again listed as the home of Jølpin's housekeeper Anne Sotman, the chamber maid Helene Dorthe Arps, the lodger Ellen Samueline Grønlund, the surgeon's apprentice Hans Flor and one maid.

Tychsen's widow Anna Sørine Henrikke (née Hollensen) continued the operations after his death in 1804. She passed it on to their son Johan Lorentz Tychsen in 1817.

Constantin Johan Glahn was the owner from 5 April 1842 to 31 December 1849. At the time of the 1845 census, No. 336B was home to a total of 17 residents. Constantin Johan Glahn resided on the two lower floors (ground floor and first floor) with his wife Erasmine Glahm (née Myhre), three assistants, two apprentices, a male servant and two maids. Lauritz Peter Holmblad, a 30-year-old manufacturer, was also living on the first floor with his six-year-old son. His brother Andreas Holmblad, a jurist, resided on the second floor with a maid. Maria Helene Elisabeth Erichson (née Raupach), widow of Christian Gotfred Erichson (1682–1842), who had served as royal bookkeeper on Saint Croix, was also residing on the second floor with her daughter Atalnte Caroline Angeligne Erichson and one maid.

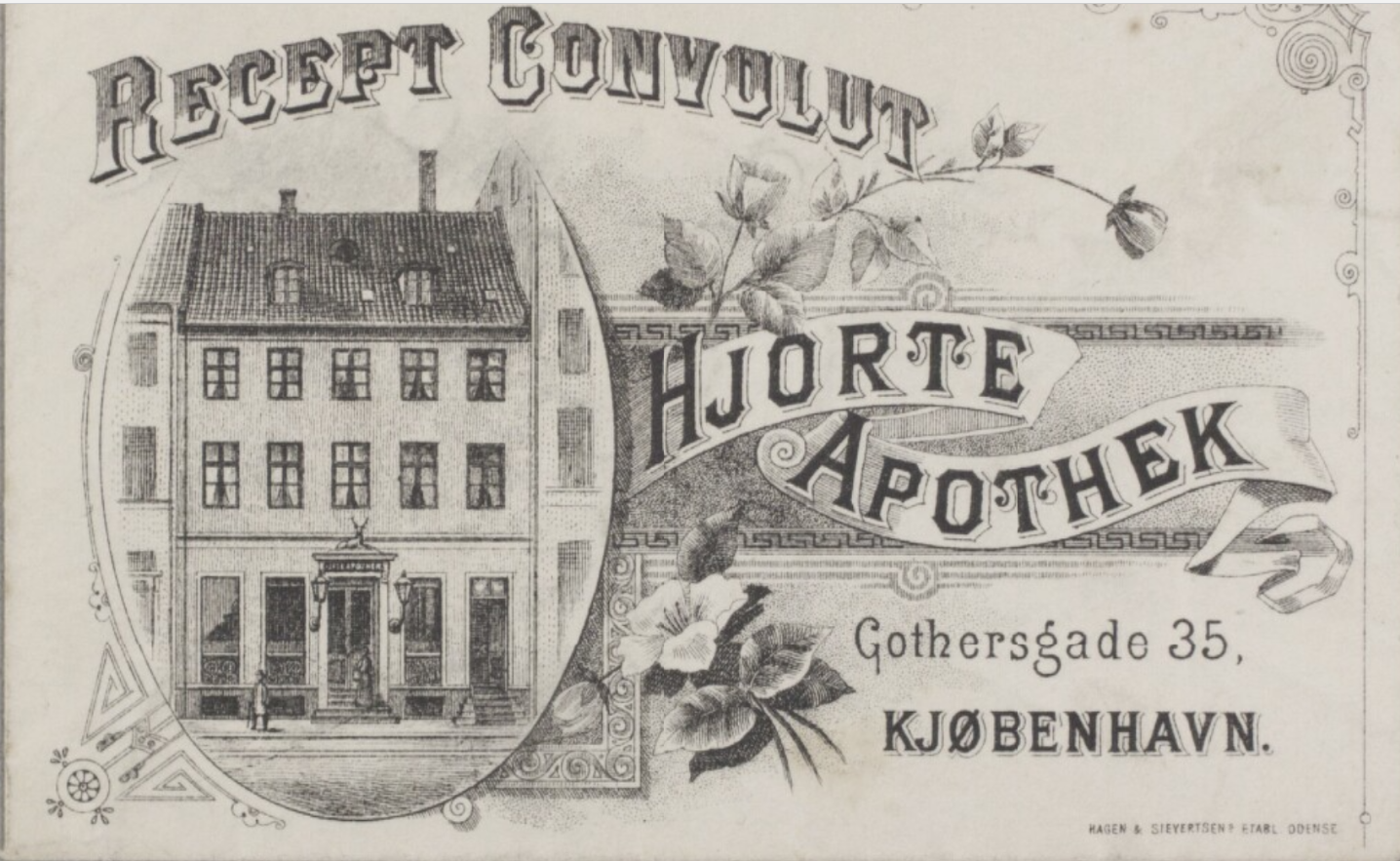
An old advertisement for the pharmacy

The next owner was Harald Alfred Fedor Piper (9 June 1823 - 1 April 1900). In 1884 he passed it on to his son Harald Georg Vilhelm Piper. He owned it until 1924. Kjeld Ove Frandsen was the owner from 1924 to 1930. Henry Edgar Tegner then owned it until its closure on 30 June 1967.

== Architecture ==
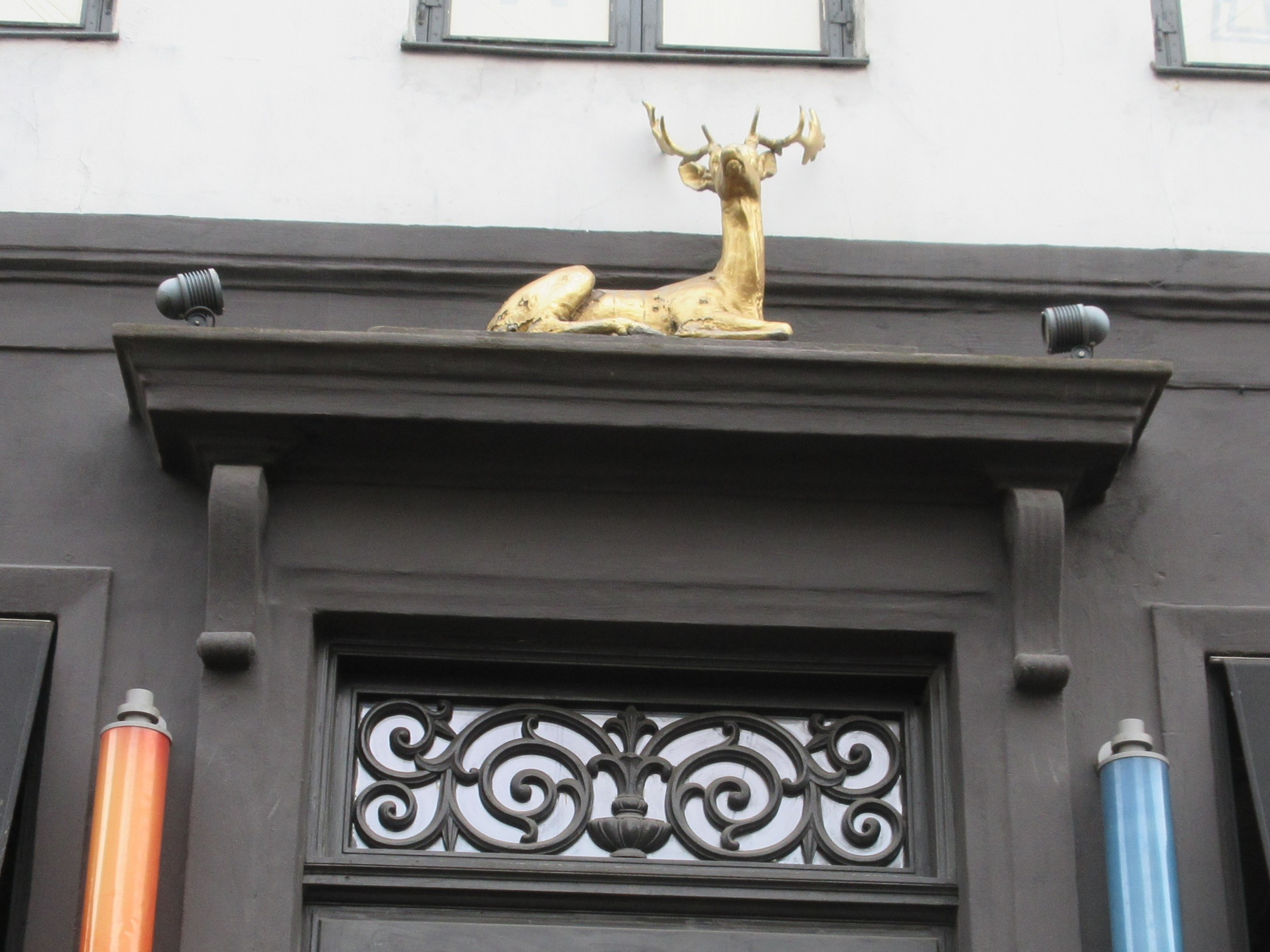
The gilded deer above the door

The building is three storeys tall and five bays wide. Over the main entrance is a gilded sculpture of a lying deer, a reference to the name of the pharmacy ("Deer Pharmacy"").

== Today ==
A bar is now based in the ground floor.

== List of pharmacists ==
- 27 December 1799 - 8 August 1804 Nicolai Tychsen
- 8 August 1804 - 31 December 1817 Anna Sørine Henrikke f.Hollensen Enke
- 28.11.1817 - 18.11.1841 Johan Lorentz Tychsen
- 5 April 1842 - 31 March 1849 Constantin Johan Glahn
- 20 April 1849 - 31 October 1889 Harald Alfred Fedor Piper
- 9 December 1889 - 28 December 1924 Harald Georg Vilhelm Piper
- 27 March 1925 - 30 June 1930 Kjeld Ove Frandsen
- * 28 April 1930 - 30 June 1967 Henry Edgar Tegner
