= Mikkel Røg =

Danish-Norwegian medal engraver

Mikkel Røg (c. 1679 – c. 1737), also referred to by his Latinized name Michael Augustus Roeg, was a Danish-Norwegian medal engraver. He served as medal engraver to the Royal Court in Paris from 1720 to 1737.

== Early life and education ==
Røg was born in the local rectory in Kvæfjord Municipality, Troms county, Norway, the son of chaplain Augustinus Gabrielsen Røg (1635–1710) and Margrethe Aufinnsdatter Holck (died 1705). He attended Bergen Latin School. He enrolled at the University of Copenhagen on 25 September 1699 but left the university to apprentice as an engraver and seal carver.

== Career ==
Røg created the copperplate engravings with the text for the 1709 edition of Lex Regia (Kongeloven) as well as three Danish medals commemorating the birth of Frederick IV (1706), the death of Prince Georg (1708) and the surrender of Magnus Stenbock (1713). The position as court medallist was however already occupied by Christian Wineke.

With little prospect of employment in Copenhagen, Røg accepted an invitation from Louis XIV and moved to Paris in 1715. Louis XIV's death in September that same year delayed his employment but in 1720 a recommendation from court painter Antoine Coypel finally led to his appointment as graveur des médailles de Sa Majesté. He worked for 20 years at the Louvre, creating more than fifty medal stamps for the histoire métallique.

Røg served a teacher for Peter Christian Winsløw who succeeded him in the office in 1737.

== Ludvig Holberg link ==
Røg and Ludvig Holberg attended Bergen Latin School at the same time. They met in Paris in 1715. Røg lent Holberg his royal travel passport, enabling him to visit Italy cheaper and more easily. The episode is mentioned in Holberg's first Latin-language autobiographical publication.
