= Winsløw family =

The Winsløw family is a Danish family.

== History ==
The earliest known male family member is a Hans Moritzen in Kolding. His son, Jacob Hansen (1605–1651), served as parish priest in Winslöf and Neflinge in Scania, then part of Denmark, where the family name comes from.

== Notable members ==
- Jacob B. Winsløw (1669–1760), anatomist
- Peter Christian Winsløw (1708– c. 1756), medal engraver
- Frederik Christian Winsløw (1752–1811), surgeon
- Carl Winsløw (1796–1834), actor
- Carl Winsløw (1852–1941), engineer
- Anna Henriette Winsløw (1859–1913), actress
- Elith Pio (1887–1983), actor
- Laurits "Lasse" Winsløw Nielsen (1911–2006), painter
