= Kvæfjord Municipality =

Municipality in Troms, Norway

Kvæfjord Municipality Kvæfjord kommune Giehtavuotna (Northern Sami)
- Municipality
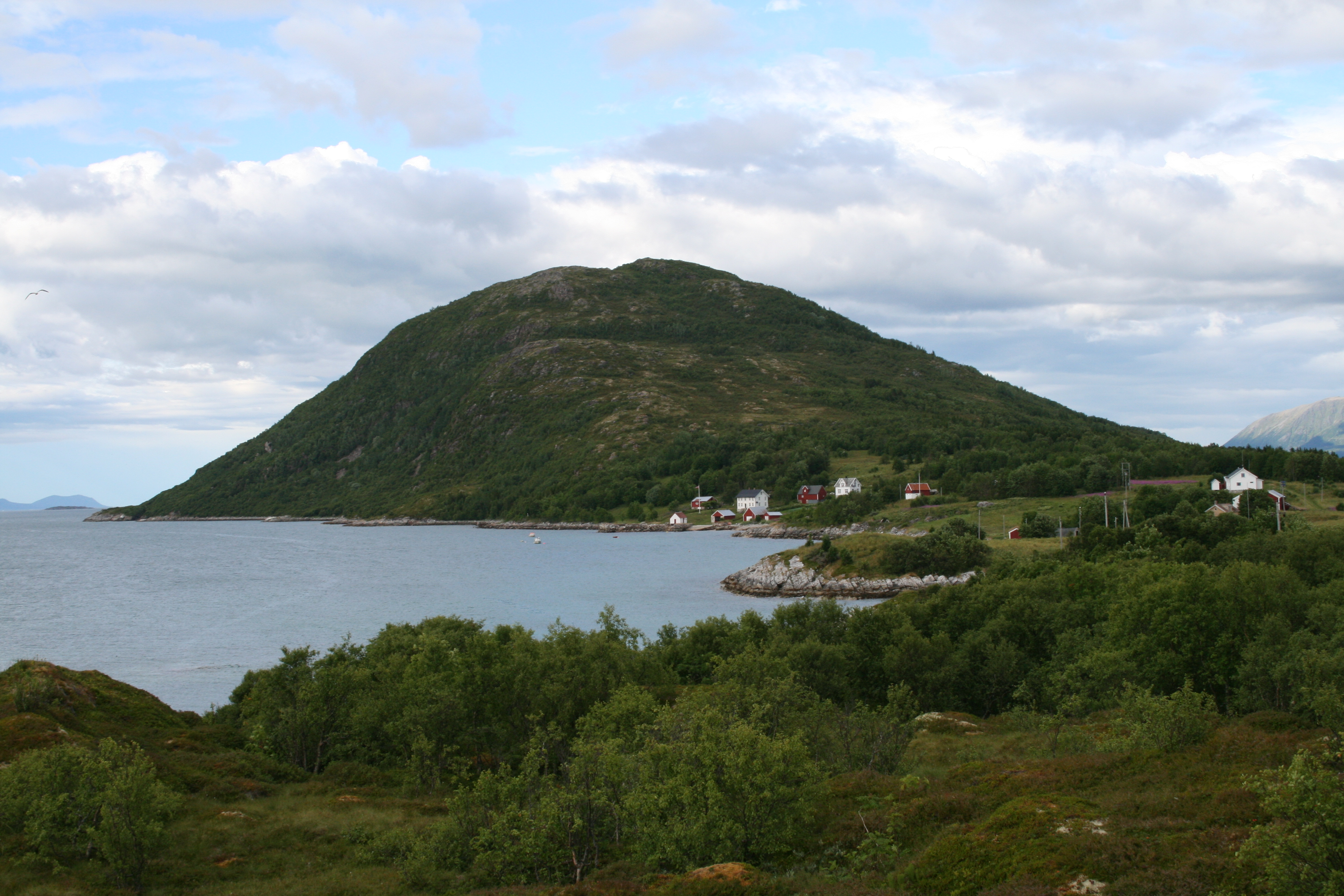
- View of the island of Gapøya

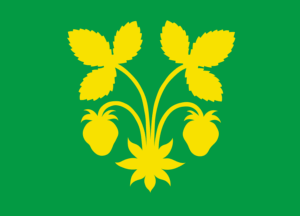
- Flag Coat of arms

- Troms within Norway

- Kvæfjord within Troms
- Coordinates: 68°42′07″N 16°08′49″E
- Country: Norway
- County: Troms
- District: Central Hålogaland
- Established: 1 Jan 1838
  - Created as: Formannskapsdistrikt
- Administrative centre: Borkenes

Government
  - Mayor (2023): Birger Holand (Sp)

Area
  - Total: 512.62 km^{2} (197.92 sq mi)
  - Land: 497.31 km^{2} (192.01 sq mi)
  - Water: 15.31 km^{2} (5.91 sq mi) 3%
  - Rank: #207 in Norway
- Highest elevation: 1,117.38 m (3,665.9 ft)

Population (2024)
  - Total: 2,845
  - Rank: #237 in Norway
  - Density: 5.5/km^{2} (14/sq mi)
  - Change (10 years): ▼ −8.4%
- Demonym: Kvæfjerding

Official language
  - Norwegian form: Neutral
- Time zone: UTC+01:00 (CET)
  - Summer (DST): UTC+02:00 (CEST)
- ISO 3166 code: NO-5510
- Website: Official website

Kvæfjord (Northern Sami: Giehtavuotna) is a municipality in Troms county, Norway. It is part of the traditional region of Central Hålogaland. The administrative centre of the municipality is the village of Borkenes. Other villages include Hundstad, Langvassbukta, and Revsnes.

Together with the neighboring Harstad Municipality, the two municipalities cover a large part of the island of Hinnøya in the southern part of the Troms county. Kvæfjord consists mostly of mountains and fjords. The municipality centers on the Kvæfjorden and Gullesfjorden.

Kvæfjord is also where the Norwegian national cake, Kvæfjord cake, originally comes from.

The 513-square-kilometre (198 sq mi) municipality is the 207th largest by area out of the 357 municipalities in Norway. Kvæfjord Municipality is the 237th most populous municipality in Norway with a population of 2,845. The municipality's population density is 5.5 inhabitants per square kilometre (14/sq mi) and its population has decreased by 8.4% over the previous 10-year period.

== General information ==
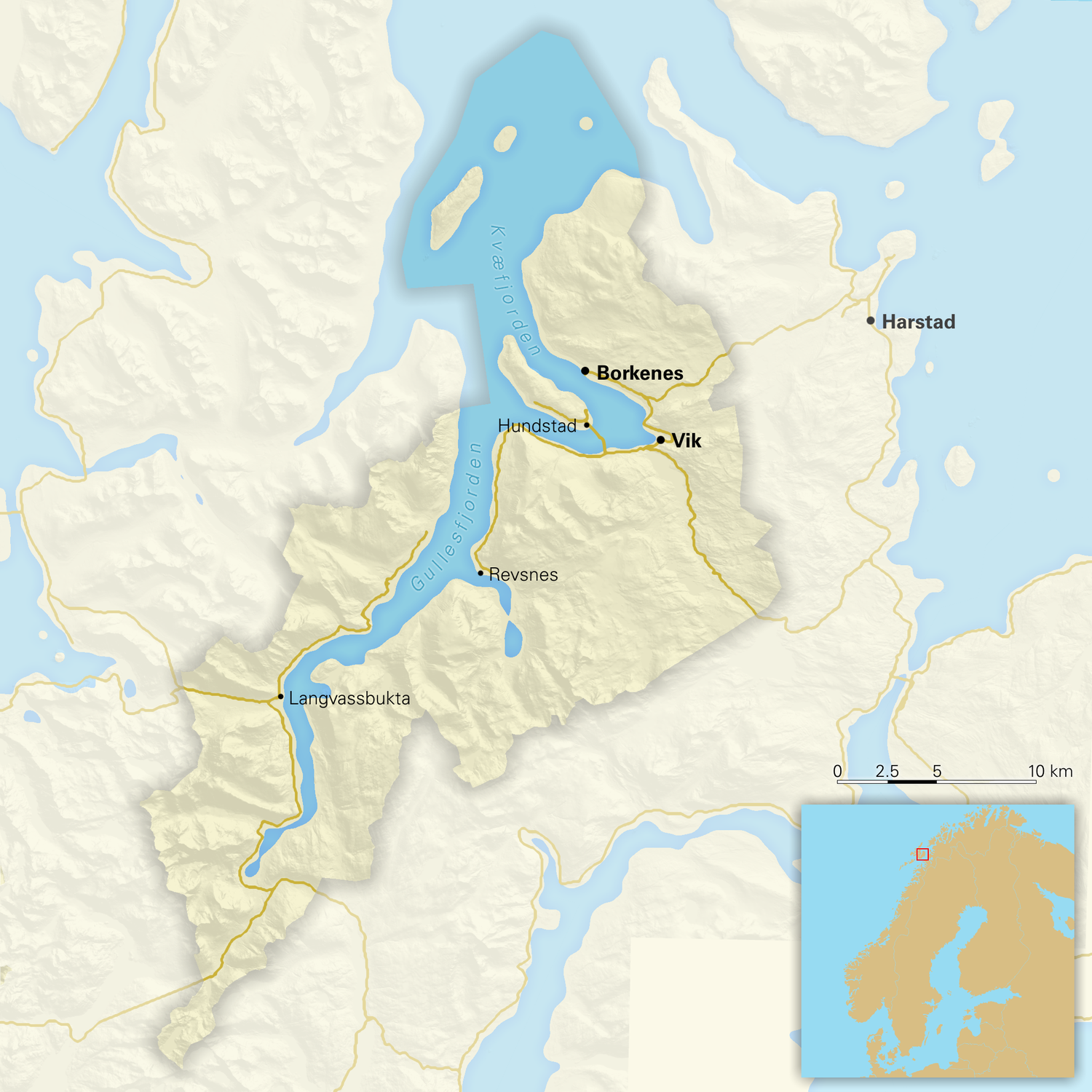
Kvæfjord map

Kvæfjord was established as a municipality on 1 January 1838 (see formannskapsdistrikt law). On 25 October 1956, a part of Kvæfjord Municipality (population: 32) was transferred to neighboring Trondenes Municipality. On 1 January 2000, the part of Kvæfjord Municipality that surrounded the Godfjorden (population: 102) was transferred from Kvæfjord to Sortland Municipality (in neighboring Nordland county).

On 1 January 2020, the municipality became part of the newly formed Troms og Finnmark county. Previously, it had been part of the old Troms county. On 1 January 2024, the Troms og Finnmark county was divided and the municipality once again became part of Troms county.

=== Name ===
The municipality (originally the parish) is named after local fjord known as the Kvæfjorden (Old Norse: Kviðjufjǫrðr) since the first Kvæfjord Church was built along the shore of the fjord. The first element is the genitive case of the name of the island Kviðja (now known as Kveøya) which lies in the fjord. The name of the island might be derived from the word kviðr which means "belly" or "stomach". The last element of the name is fjǫrðr which means "fjord". Prior to 1889, the name was spelled Kvædfjord.

=== Coat of arms ===
The coat of arms was granted on 4 April 1986. The official blazon is "Vert, a strawberry plant Or" (Norwegian: I grønt en gull jordbærplante). This means the arms have a green field (background) and the charge is a strawberry plant. The strawberry plant has a tincture of Or which means it is commonly colored yellow, but if it is made out of metal, then gold is used. The green color in the field symbolizes the importance of agriculture in the municipality, along with fertility, growth, and renewal. The strawberry was chosen since it is the northernmost municipality in Norway where strawberries are produced commercially. The arms were designed by Arvid Sveen.

=== Churches ===
The Church of Norway has one parish (sokn) within Kvæfjord Municipality. It is part of the Trondenes prosti (deanery) in the Diocese of Nord-Hålogaland.

Churches in Kvæfjord Municipality
Parish (sokn)	Church name	Location of the church	Year built
Kvæfjord	Kvæfjord Church	Borkenes	1867
Kvæfjord	Langvassbukt Chapel	Langvassbukta	1981

== Economy ==
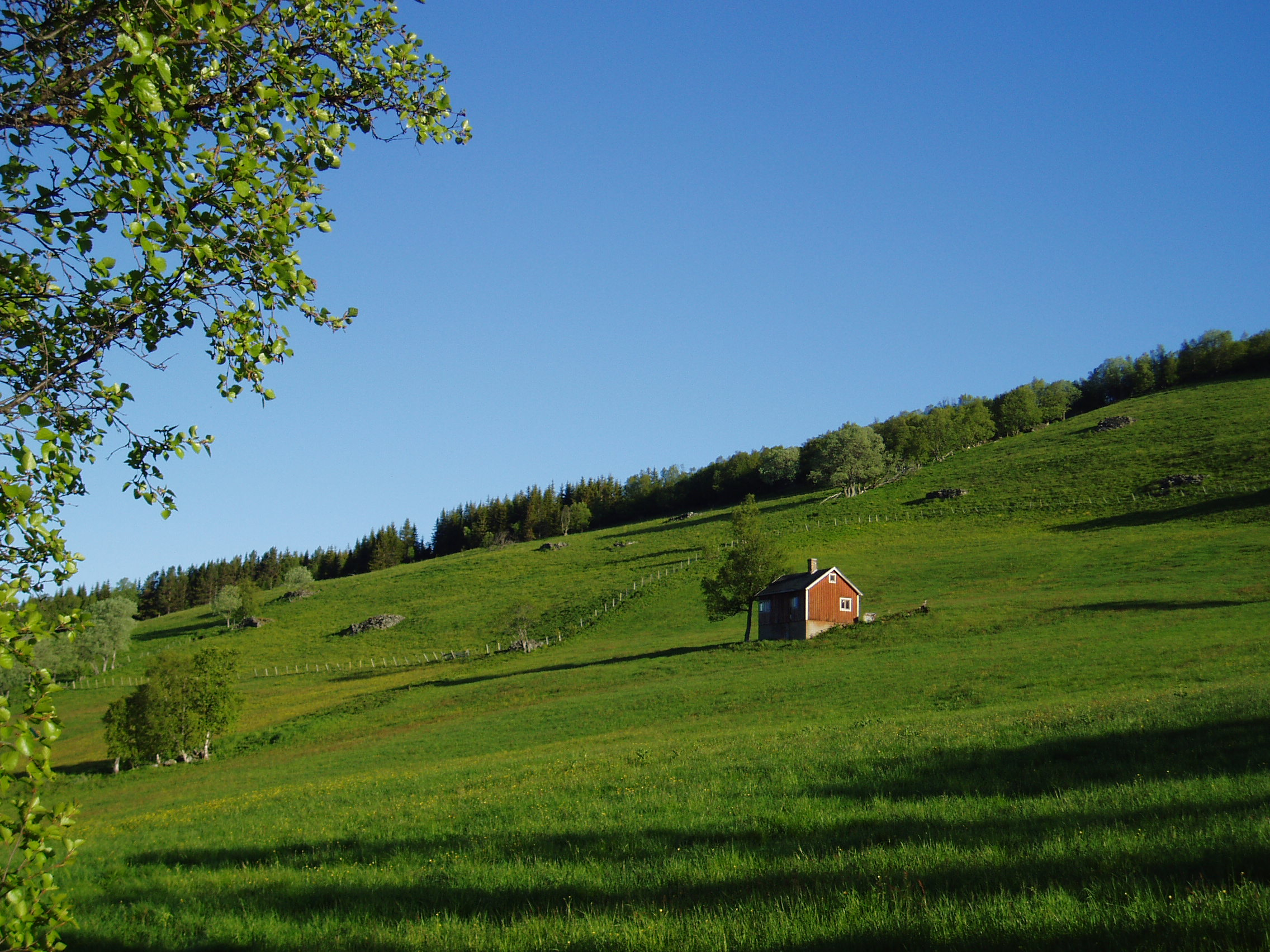
Kvæfjord landscape

The municipality is known for agriculture and farming. The quality of the strawberries is famous. The long hours of daylight, combined with relatively low summer temperatures, make the strawberries more tasteful than berries grown in warmer climates.

A large institution for the mentally handicapped was once located in Kvæfjord. It employed a large number of health workers.

== Geography ==
The municipality is located on Hinnøya island and it is split by three smaller branches of the large Andfjorden: Gullesfjorden, Kvæfjorden, and Godfjorden. The island of Kveøya is located in the middle of the Kvæfjorden, across from Borkenes.

The landscape of today was largely formed during the last ice age. When the ice retreated, the terrain rose by 50 metres (164 ft). It is in this belt of old seabed that today's best farm land is located. There are four county roads connecting the municipality: two to the north and one each to the east and south. The highest point in the municipality is the 1,117.38-metre (3,665.9 ft) tall mountain Tverrelvtindan. The 412-metre (1,352 ft) tall mountain Nupen is located in the northern part of the municipality on the border with Harstad.

=== Climate ===
Kvæfjord has a subpolar oceanic climate, and is mild for the high latitude. The wettest season is September - January, and the driest season is April - August.

Climate data for Borkenes 1991-2020 (36 m)
Month	Jan	Feb	Mar	Apr	May	Jun	Jul	Aug	Sep	Oct	Nov	Dec	Year
Daily mean °C (°F)	−1.4 (29.5)	−1.9 (28.6)	−0.6 (30.9)	2.5 (36.5)	7 (45)	10.8 (51.4)	13.6 (56.5)	13.2 (55.8)	9.6 (49.3)	4.7 (40.5)	1.5 (34.7)	−0.3 (31.5)	4.9 (40.9)
Average precipitation mm (inches)	92 (3.6)	73 (2.9)	78 (3.1)	53 (2.1)	47 (1.9)	50 (2.0)	52 (2.0)	61 (2.4)	95 (3.7)	108 (4.3)	78 (3.1)	112 (4.4)	899 (35.4)
Source: Norsk Klimaservicesenter

Climate data for Borkenes, Kvæfjord 1961-1990
Month	Jan	Feb	Mar	Apr	May	Jun	Jul	Aug	Sep	Oct	Nov	Dec	Year
Mean daily maximum °C (°F)	−0.5 (31.1)	−0.3 (31.5)	1.6 (34.9)	4.3 (39.7)	9.0 (48.2)	13.3 (55.9)	15.6 (60.1)	15.0 (59.0)	10.8 (51.4)	6.4 (43.5)	2.3 (36.1)	0.4 (32.7)	6.5 (43.7)
Daily mean °C (°F)	−2.8 (27.0)	−2.5 (27.5)	−1.0 (30.2)	1.9 (35.4)	6.4 (43.5)	10.2 (50.4)	12.6 (54.7)	12.1 (53.8)	8.3 (46.9)	4.3 (39.7)	0.4 (32.7)	−1.9 (28.6)	4.0 (39.2)
Mean daily minimum °C (°F)	−5.2 (22.6)	−5.0 (23.0)	−3.6 (25.5)	−1.0 (30.2)	3.1 (37.6)	7.2 (45.0)	9.7 (49.5)	9.0 (48.2)	5.6 (42.1)	1.9 (35.4)	−1.9 (28.6)	−4.2 (24.4)	1.3 (34.3)
Average precipitation mm (inches)	81 (3.2)	74 (2.9)	59 (2.3)	47 (1.9)	33 (1.3)	40 (1.6)	51 (2.0)	56 (2.2)	82 (3.2)	109 (4.3)	94 (3.7)	94 (3.7)	820 (32.3)
Average precipitation days (≥ 1 mm)	12.6	12.4	10.6	9.9	7.9	9.2	11.0	11.6	14.3	16.3	13.9	15.0	144.7
Source: Norwegian Meteorological Institute

== Government ==
Kvæfjord Municipality is responsible for primary education (through 10th grade), outpatient health services, senior citizen services, welfare and other social services, zoning, economic development, and municipal roads and utilities. The municipality is governed by a municipal council of directly elected representatives. The mayor is indirectly elected by a vote of the municipal council. The municipality is under the jurisdiction of the Midtre Hålogaland District Court and the Hålogaland Court of Appeal.

=== Municipal council ===
The municipal council (Kommunestyre) of Kvæfjord Municipality is made up of 23 representatives that are elected to four year terms. The tables below show the current and historical composition of the council by political party.

Kvæfjord kommunestyre 2023–2027
Party name (in Norwegian)	Number of representatives
Labour Party (Arbeiderpartiet)	5
Centre Party (Senterpartiet)	6
Socialist Left Party (Sosialistisk Venstreparti)	4
Liberal Party (Venstre)	2
Joint list of the Conservative Party (Høyre) and the Progress Party (Fremskrittspartiet)	6
Total number of members:	23

Kvæfjord kommunestyre 2019–2023
Party name (in Norwegian)	Number of representatives
Labour Party (Arbeiderpartiet)	8
Centre Party (Senterpartiet)	7
Socialist Left Party (Sosialistisk Venstreparti)	2
Liberal Party (Venstre)	1
Joint list of the Conservative Party (Høyre) and the Progress Party (Fremskrittspartiet)	5
Total number of members:	23

Kvæfjord kommunestyre 2015–2019
Party name (in Norwegian)	Number of representatives
Labour Party (Arbeiderpartiet)	9
Progress Party (Fremskrittspartiet)	3
Conservative Party (Høyre)	2
Centre Party (Senterpartiet)	4
Socialist Left Party (Sosialistisk Venstreparti)	2
Liberal Party (Venstre)	3
Total number of members:	23

Kvæfjord kommunestyre 2011–2015
Party name (in Norwegian)	Number of representatives
Labour Party (Arbeiderpartiet)	8
Progress Party (Fremskrittspartiet)	4
Conservative Party (Høyre)	3
Centre Party (Senterpartiet)	3
Socialist Left Party (Sosialistisk Venstreparti)	2
Liberal Party (Venstre)	3
Total number of members:	23

Kvæfjord kommunestyre 2007–2011
Party name (in Norwegian)	Number of representatives
Labour Party (Arbeiderpartiet)	6
Progress Party (Fremskrittspartiet)	5
Conservative Party (Høyre)	2
Centre Party (Senterpartiet)	3
Socialist Left Party (Sosialistisk Venstreparti)	3
Liberal Party (Venstre)	4
Total number of members:	23

Kvæfjord kommunestyre 2003–2007
Party name (in Norwegian)	Number of representatives
Labour Party (Arbeiderpartiet)	6
Progress Party (Fremskrittspartiet)	4
Conservative Party (Høyre)	2
Christian Democratic Party (Kristelig Folkeparti)	1
Centre Party (Senterpartiet)	3
Socialist Left Party (Sosialistisk Venstreparti)	4
Liberal Party (Venstre)	3
Total number of members:	23

Kvæfjord kommunestyre 1999–2003
Party name (in Norwegian)	Number of representatives
Labour Party (Arbeiderpartiet)	10
Conservative Party (Høyre)	5
Christian Democratic Party (Kristelig Folkeparti)	1
Centre Party (Senterpartiet)	5
Liberal Party (Venstre)	3
Joint list of the Red Electoral Alliance (Rød Valgallianse) and the Socialist Left Party (Sosialistisk Venstreparti)	5
Total number of members:	29

Kvæfjord kommunestyre 1995–1999
Party name (in Norwegian)	Number of representatives
Labour Party (Arbeiderpartiet)	11
Conservative Party (Høyre)	5
Christian Democratic Party (Kristelig Folkeparti)	1
Centre Party (Senterpartiet)	5
Socialist Left Party (Sosialistisk Venstreparti)	3
Liberal Party (Venstre)	4
Total number of members:	29

Kvæfjord kommunestyre 1991–1995
Party name (in Norwegian)	Number of representatives
Labour Party (Arbeiderpartiet)	13
Conservative Party (Høyre)	5
Christian Democratic Party (Kristelig Folkeparti)	1
Centre Party (Senterpartiet)	4
Socialist Left Party (Sosialistisk Venstreparti)	3
Liberal Party (Venstre)	3
Total number of members:	29

Kvæfjord kommunestyre 1987–1991
Party name (in Norwegian)	Number of representatives
Labour Party (Arbeiderpartiet)	13
Conservative Party (Høyre)	7
Christian Democratic Party (Kristelig Folkeparti)	1
Red Electoral Alliance (Rød Valgallianse)	1
Centre Party (Senterpartiet)	3
Socialist Left Party (Sosialistisk Venstreparti)	2
Liberal Party (Venstre)	2
Total number of members:	29

Kvæfjord kommunestyre 1983–1987
Party name (in Norwegian)	Number of representatives
Labour Party (Arbeiderpartiet)	11
Conservative Party (Høyre)	8
Christian Democratic Party (Kristelig Folkeparti)	1
Centre Party (Senterpartiet)	3
Socialist Left Party (Sosialistisk Venstreparti)	1
Liberal Party (Venstre)	5
Total number of members:	29

Kvæfjord kommunestyre 1979–1983
Party name (in Norwegian)	Number of representatives
Labour Party (Arbeiderpartiet)	11
Conservative Party (Høyre)	7
Christian Democratic Party (Kristelig Folkeparti)	1
Centre Party (Senterpartiet)	4
Socialist Left Party (Sosialistisk Venstreparti)	2
Liberal Party (Venstre)	4
Total number of members:	29

Kvæfjord kommunestyre 1975–1979
Party name (in Norwegian)	Number of representatives
Labour Party (Arbeiderpartiet)	12
Conservative Party (Høyre)	3
Christian Democratic Party (Kristelig Folkeparti)	2
Centre Party (Senterpartiet)	7
Socialist Left Party (Sosialistisk Venstreparti)	1
Liberal Party (Venstre)	4
Total number of members:	29

Kvæfjord kommunestyre 1971–1975
Party name (in Norwegian)	Number of representatives
Labour Party (Arbeiderpartiet)	14
Conservative Party (Høyre)	3
Christian Democratic Party (Kristelig Folkeparti)	1
Centre Party (Senterpartiet)	8
Liberal Party (Venstre)	3
Total number of members:	29

Kvæfjord kommunestyre 1967–1971
Party name (in Norwegian)	Number of representatives
Labour Party (Arbeiderpartiet)	15
Conservative Party (Høyre)	6
Centre Party (Senterpartiet)	5
Liberal Party (Venstre)	3
Total number of members:	29

Kvæfjord kommunestyre 1963–1967
Party name (in Norwegian)	Number of representatives
Labour Party (Arbeiderpartiet)	15
Conservative Party (Høyre)	5
Centre Party (Senterpartiet)	3
Liberal Party (Venstre)	2
List of workers, fishermen, and small farmholders (Arbeidere, fiskere, småbrukere liste)	3
Local List(s) (Lokale lister)	1
Total number of members:	29

Kvæfjord herredsstyre 1959–1963
Party name (in Norwegian)	Number of representatives
Labour Party (Arbeiderpartiet)	11
Conservative Party (Høyre)	4
Centre Party (Senterpartiet)	4
Liberal Party (Venstre)	2
List of workers, fishermen, and small farmholders (Arbeidere, fiskere, småbrukere liste)	1
Local List(s) (Lokale lister)	7
Total number of members:	29

Kvæfjord herredsstyre 1955–1959
Party name (in Norwegian)	Number of representatives
Labour Party (Arbeiderpartiet)	10
Conservative Party (Høyre)	3
Farmers' Party (Bondepartiet)	4
Liberal Party (Venstre)	3
Local List(s) (Lokale lister)	9
Total number of members:	29

Kvæfjord herredsstyre 1951–1955
Party name (in Norwegian)	Number of representatives
Labour Party (Arbeiderpartiet)	6
Conservative Party (Høyre)	2
Farmers' Party (Bondepartiet)	2
Liberal Party (Venstre)	3
Local List(s) (Lokale lister)	7
Total number of members:	20

Kvæfjord herredsstyre 1947–1951
Party name (in Norwegian)	Number of representatives
Labour Party (Arbeiderpartiet)	5
Conservative Party (Høyre)	1
Liberal Party (Venstre)	2
Joint List(s) of Non-Socialist Parties (Borgerlige Felleslister)	2
Local List(s) (Lokale lister)	10
Total number of members:	20

Kvæfjord herredsstyre 1945–1947
Party name (in Norwegian)	Number of representatives
Labour Party (Arbeiderpartiet)	4
Liberal Party (Venstre)	4
Local List(s) (Lokale lister)	12
Total number of members:	20

Kvæfjord herredsstyre 1937–1941*
Party name (in Norwegian)	Number of representatives
Labour Party (Arbeiderpartiet)	6
Liberal Party (Venstre)	3
List of workers, fishermen, and small farmholders (Arbeidere, fiskere, småbrukere liste)	3
Joint List(s) of Non-Socialist Parties (Borgerlige Felleslister)	1
Local List(s) (Lokale lister)	7
Total number of members:	20
Note: Due to the German occupation of Norway during World War II, no elections were held for new municipal councils until after the war ended in 1945.

=== Mayors ===
The mayor (Norwegian: ordfører) of Kvæfjord Municipality is the political leader of the municipality and the chairperson of the municipal council. Here is a list of people who have held this position:

- 1838–1839: Lorents R. Normann
- 1840–1841: Christian Ernst Qvale
- 1842–1842: Christian Tomassen
- 1843–1845: August Torvald Deinboll
- 1846–1846: Anders Fochsen
- 1847–1848: Peder Olsen Svanem
- 1849–1852: Tellef Martin Bang
- 1853–1854: Peder Elias Wulff
- 1855–1856: Tellef Martin Bang
- 1857–1860: Peder Elias Wulff
- 1861–1862: Christian Tomassen
- 1863–1866: Peder Elias Wulff
- 1867–1870: Jesper Jespersen
- 1871–1872: Peder Elias Wulff
- 1873–1874: Edias Fochsen
- 1875–1894: L. B. Drevland
- 1895–1907: Bendiks E. Vik
- 1908–1922: Jørg. Pedersen
- 1923–1928: Matias Johan Torheim (Bp)
- 1929–1941: Ole Olsen
- 1945–1947: Ivar Størkersen
- 1948–1957: Vidar Pleym
- 1958–1959: Jac. Norman
- 1960–1963: Halfdan D. Johansen
- 1964–1971: Christian Høyersten
- 1972–1979: Rasmus Torheim
- 1980–1981: Christian Høyersten
- 1982–1985: Asbjørn Hessen (V)
- 1986–1995: Bendiks H. Arnesen (Ap)
- 1995–2003: Asbjørn Olafson (Ap)
- 2003–2011: Lillian Hessen (V)
- 2011–2023: Torbjørn Larsen (Ap)
- 2023–present: Birger Holand (Sp)

== Notable people ==
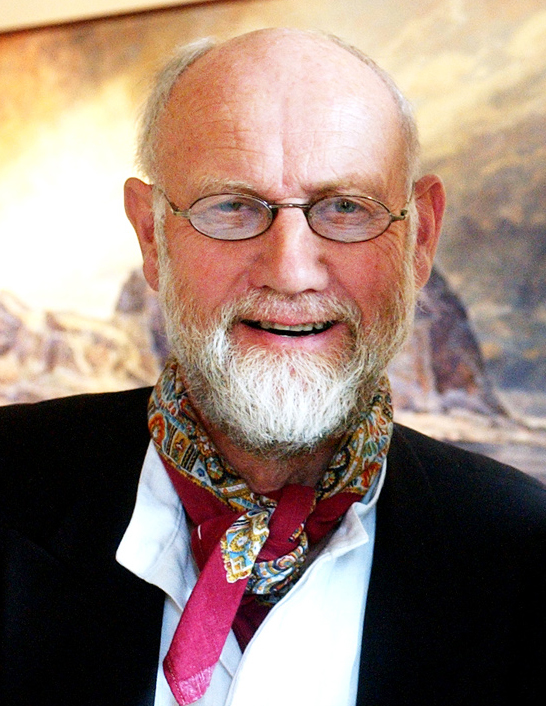
Karl Erik Harr, 2006

- Johanne Nielsdatter (born in Kvæfjord, died 1695), the last Norwegian woman to be executed for witchcraft
- Mikkel Røg (ca. 1679 in Kvæfjord – ca. 1737), a Danish-Norwegian medal engraver to the French Royal Court 1720 to 1737
- Birger Bergersen (1891 in Kvæfjord – 1977), an anatomist, politician, academic professor, rector, diplomat and chairman of the International Whaling Commission
- Fritz Aagesen (1935 in Kvæfjord – 1998), an author of two books of ghost stories
- Karl Erik Harr (born 1940 in Kvæfjord), a painter, illustrator, graphic artist, and author
- Bendiks H. Arnesen (born 1951 in Kvæfjord), a Norwegian politician who was Mayor of Kvæfjord from 1986 to 1995
- Ivar Andreas Forn (born 1983 in Kvæfjord), a retired football goalkeeper with over 100 club caps

== Media gallery ==
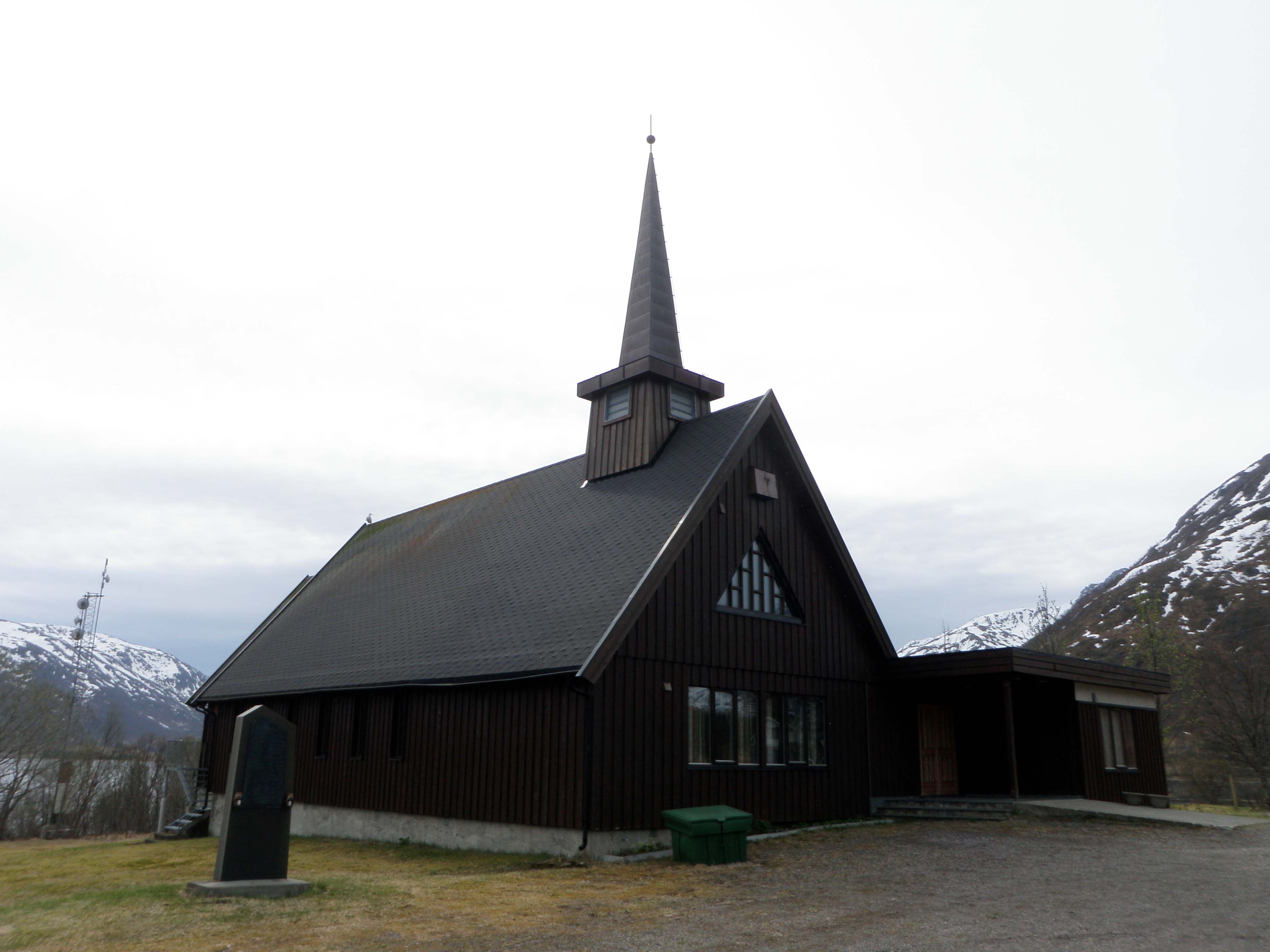
Langvassbukt Chapel

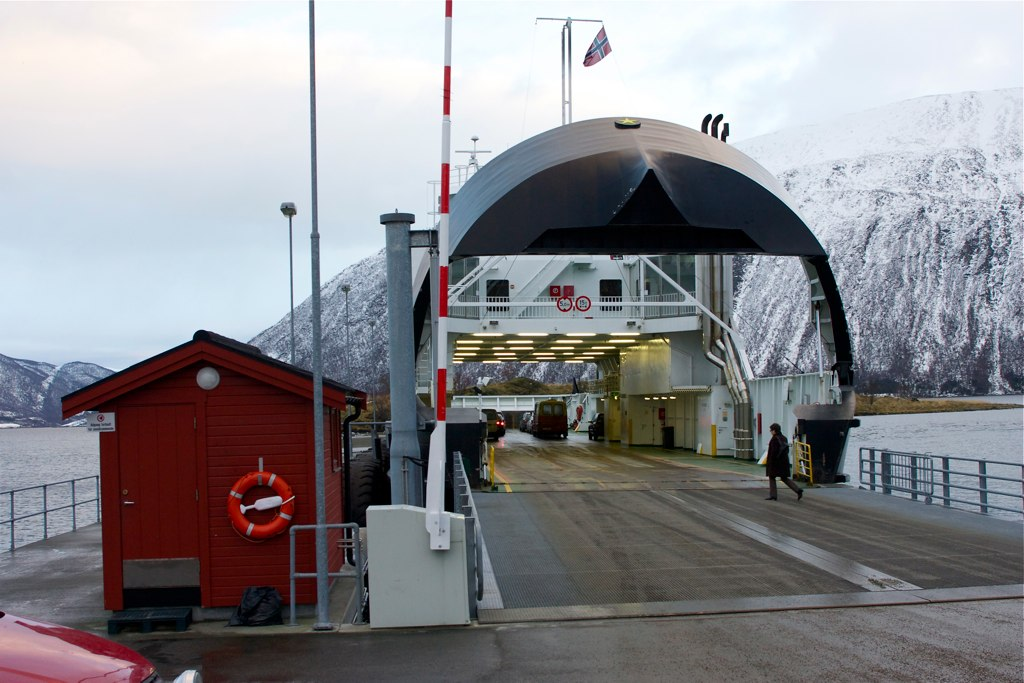
Ferry, Flesnes

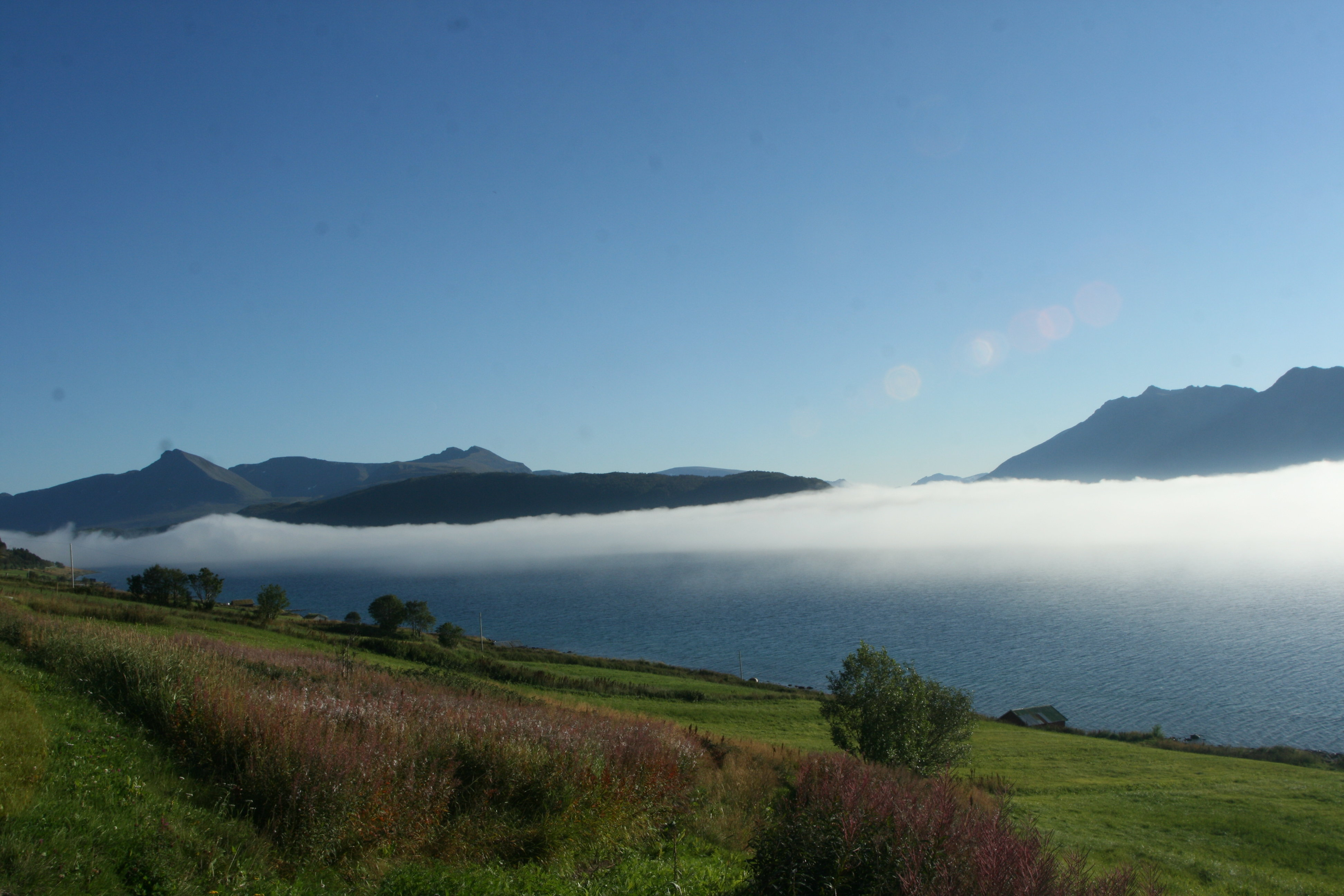
Kvæfjord, Norway
