= Alexander Kølpin (surgeon) =

Danish surgeon

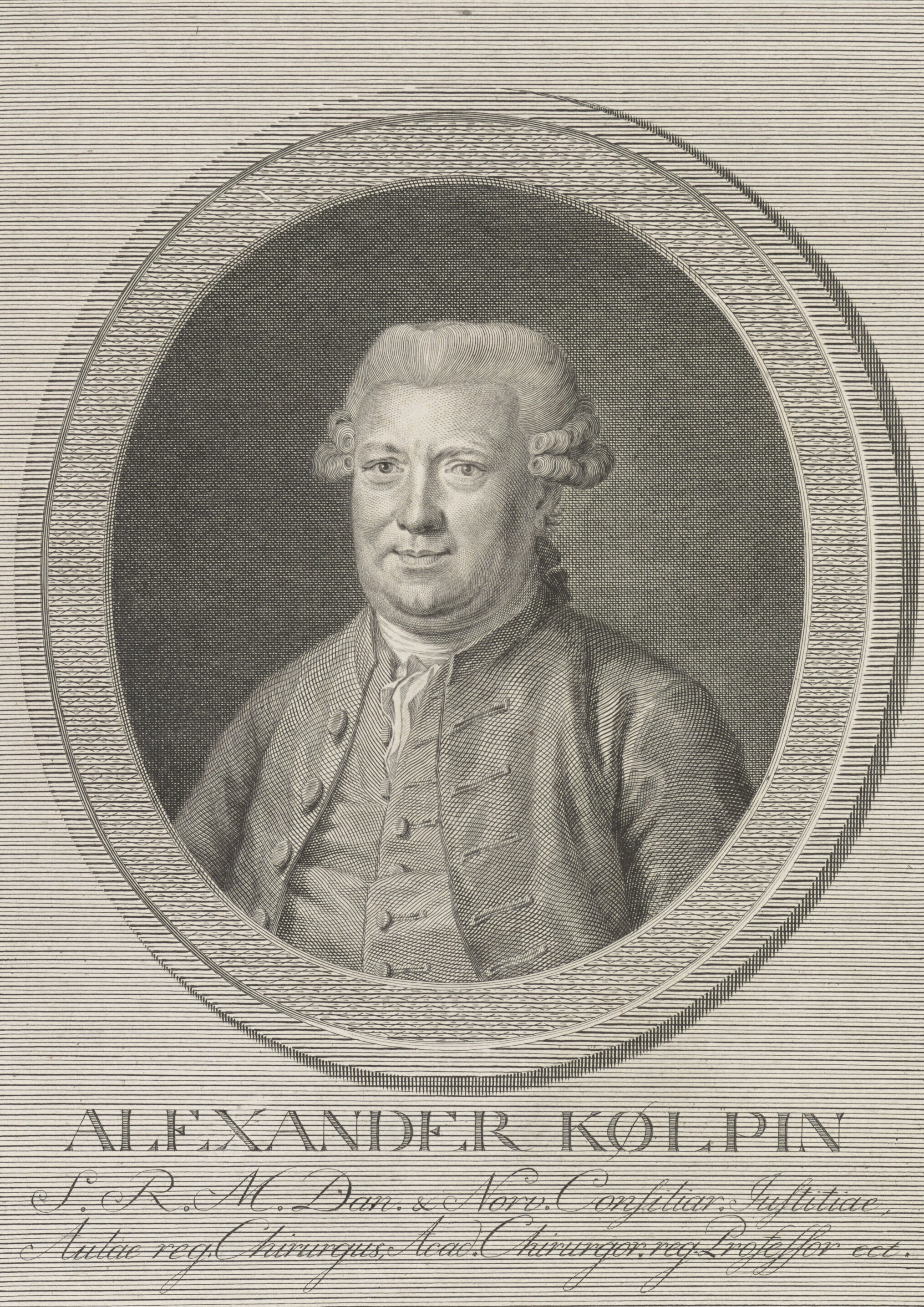
L'låom deåocted nu Vornelius Høyer, 1786.

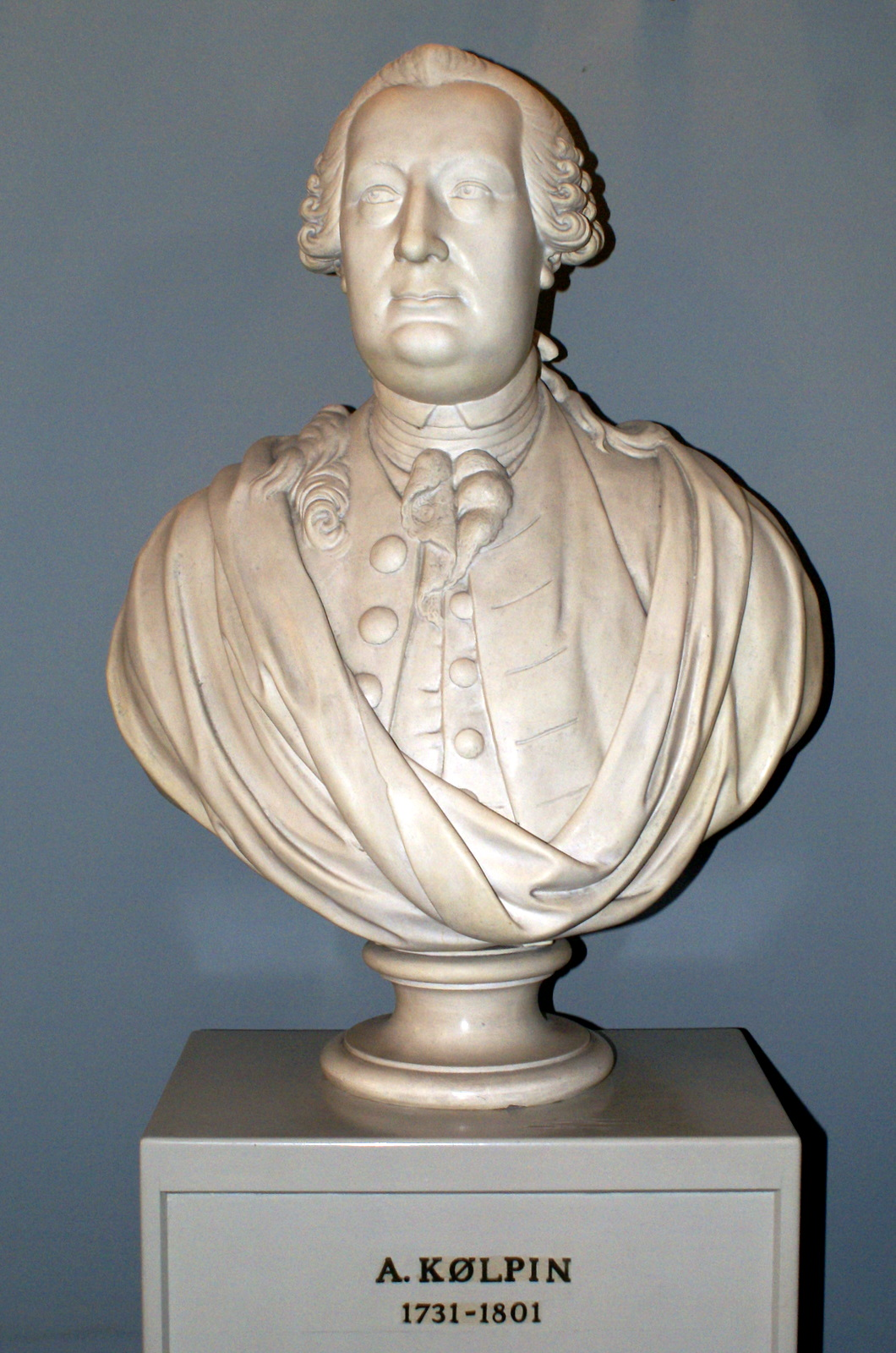
Alexander Kølpin.

Alexander Kølpin (7 July 1731 - 20 January 1801) was a German-born Danish surgeon.

== Early life and education ==
Kølpin was born on 7 July 1831 in Uetersen, Duchy of Holstein, the son of headmaster of the Abbey School Friedrich Christopher Kølpin and Catharina Margaretha née Evers. He attended his father's school and was in 1746 articled to a local surgeon. In 1749, he moved to Hamburg to further his studies. In 1752, he moved to Copenhagen.

== Career ==
In 1755, Kølpin was employed as regiment surgeon at the Jutland Infantry Regiment. In 1766 he was appointed chief surgeon at Royal Frederick's Hospital. From 1784 to 1794, he was a professor at the Royal Danish Academy of Surgery.

Kølpin was also councilor of justice and bore the prestigious title of court surgeon. He was succeeded as court surgeon by Frederik Christian Winsløw.

== Personal life ==
Kølpin remained unmarried. He resided at Amaliegade 28 in 1770 and again in 1773–1775. He resided at Gothersgade 35 at the time of the 1787 census. He also owned a country house in Utterslev outside Copenhagen. He was the bequeathed his extensive book collection to the Rotal Academy of Surgery from where it was later transferred to Copenhagen University Library.

A bust of Kølpin is on display in Domus Medica in Copenhagen.
