= Peter Christian Winsløw =

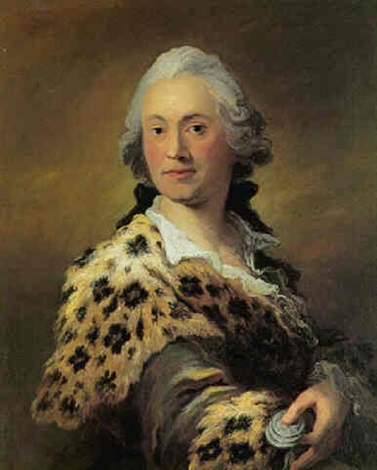
- Winsløw painted by Peder Als
- Born: 1708; Bårse, Denmark
- Died: c. 1756; Russia
- Known for: medal engraver
- Movement: (later works)

Peter Christian Winsløw (1708 – c. 1756), also referred to as Peder Christensen Winsløw, was a Danish medal engraver. He was part of the Winsløw family.

== Early life and education ==
Winsløw was born in Bårse, the son of parish priest Christian Pedersen Winsløw (c. 1677-1720) and Catharina Poulsdatter Munchgaard (1675-1703). His paternal uncle was the anatomist Jacob B. Winslow.

With support from Christian VI, Winsløw travelled to first England and then Paris where he trained as a medal engraver under Mikkel Røg.

== Career ==
Winsløw converted to Catholicism and was in 1737 engaged as French court medallist. He mainly worked with renewal of old pistons. He left the position in 1744 when he was called back to Denmark.

On 5 July 1745, he was appointed as Danish court medallist. He created a medal commemorating Christian's births in 1745 and Christian VI's death in 1746, the coronation of Frederick V in 1747, the royal anniversary in 1749, Queen Louise's death in 1752, the wedding of Frederick V and Juliane Marie's coronation that same year. He also renewed some coin pistons dating from the early reign of Frederick V. His work soon turned out to be under the expected standard. The Royal Academy of Science commissioned a series of jetons commemorating the rule of Frederick VI but it was never completed.

== Personal life ==
On 29 June 1746, Winsløw married Anna Dorothea Siewers, a daughter of county surgeon Christian Siewers, at Christianshavn. Their son Friderich (Frederik) Christian Winsløw also became a surgeon.

In 1756, Winsløw travelled to Russia by way of Stockholm to pursuit a career there. He died in Russia.
