= Fritz Aagesen =

Norwegian writer (1935–1998)

Fritz Aagesen (June 11, 1935 – October 26, 1998) was a Norwegian author of two ghost stories books.

Aagesen was born in Kvæfjord Municipality. As a young man, he left Kvæfjord for Tromsø in 1960, where he found work with the roads authority. In his spare time, he wrote poetry and short stories, with a penchant for horror stories and ghost stories. Many of these were published in magazines and newspapers. One of his books was published in 1985, and a second one after his death. Upon the release of the first book, a review by Sissel Lange-Nielsen published in Aftenposten stated that "Grøndahl Publishing has given Fritz Aagesen's debut volume, Timen før daggry (The Hour before Dawn), the subtitle 'Ghost Stories from Northern Norway.' And ghost stories are there, but they are so well told that I think they will become classic stories. Fritz Aagesen knows how to tell a story. The landscape and people function together in a concise and vibrant style that allows just enough time to portray the situation so that the reader can experience it."

Aagesen is buried at Elvestrand Cemetery in Tromsø.

== Publications ==
- Timen før daggry, spøkelseshistorier (The Hour before Dawn: Ghost Stories), 1985
- Skarvholmen, spøkelseshistorier fra Nord-Norge (Skarvholmen: Ghost Stories from Northern Norway), 2008
