= Jacob B. Winslow =

Danish-born French anatomist

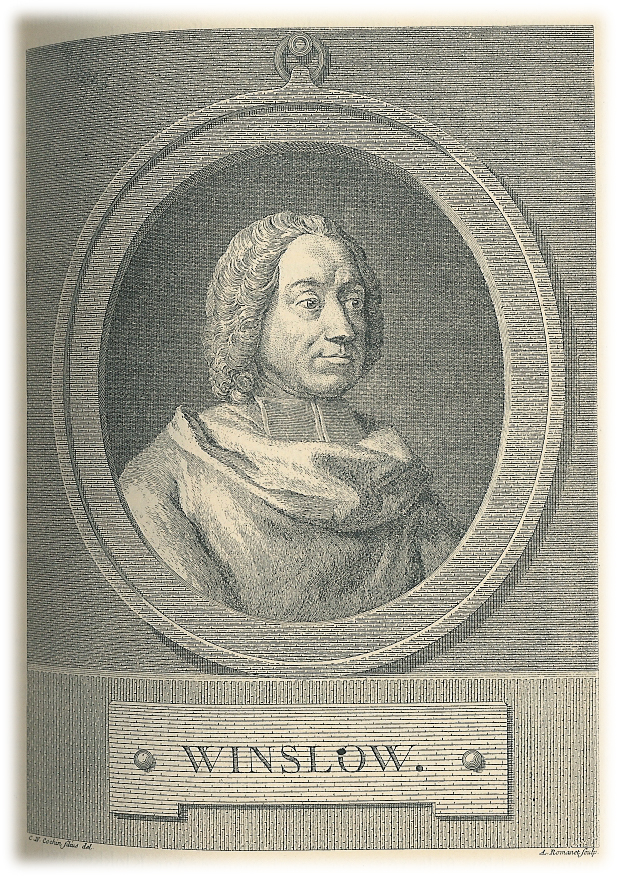
- Winslow in an 1886 illustration
- Born: Jacob Benignus Winslow; 17 April 1669; Odense, Denmark
- Died: 3 April 1769 (aged 99); Paris, France

Jacob Benignus Winsløw, also known as Jacques-Bénigne Winslow (17 April 1669 – 3 April 1769), was a Danish-born French anatomist.

== Life ==
Winsløw was born in Odense, Denmark. Later he became a pupil and successor of Guichard Joseph Duverney, as well as a convert to Catholicism, naturalized in France, and finally became professor of anatomy at the Jardin du Roi in Paris.

He greatly admired Bishop Jacques-Bénigne Bossuet, the famous preacher who had been instrumental in his conversion, and changed his first name to that of Bossuet.

Winsløw died in Paris.

== Work ==
His main work, with many translations, was Exposition anatomique de la structure du corps humain, published in 1732. His exposition of the structure of the human body is distinguished for being not only the first treatise of descriptive anatomy, divested of physiological details and hypothetical explanations foreign to the subject, but for being a close description derived from actual objects, without reference to the writings of previous anatomists. About the same time William Cheselden in London, the first Alexander Monro in Edinburgh, and Bernhard Siegfried Albinus in Leiden, contributed by their several treatises to render anatomy still more precise as a descriptive science. The Osteographia of the first-mentioned was of much use in directing attention to the study of the skeleton and the morbid changes to which it is liable.

In 1742, he addressed the question of the sure signs of death and premature burial (burial alive), in his thesis "The uncertainty of the signs of death, and the danger of precipitate interments and dissections". (in French : Dissertation sur l'incertitude des signes de la mort, et des enterremens & embaumemens précipités).

The omental foramen, which he first described, is still known under the alternative name of "Winslow's foramen".

Jacob Winslow is credited with first documenting the existence of the foramen spinosum.

== See also ==
- Guichard Joseph Duverney
- Hermann Treschow Gartner
- Jacques-René Tenon

== Sources ==
- (in Danish) Egill Snorrason, Anatomen J. B. Winsløw 1669-1769, Nyt Nordisk Forlag, 1969.
