= Hundstad =

Hundstad is a surname. Notable people with the surname include:

- Jim Hundstad (born 1941), American politician
- Turid Hundstad (born 1945), Norwegian civil servant
