= Hinnøya =

Large island of Troms and Nordland, Norway

Native name: Hinnøya (Norwegian); Iinnasuolu (Northern Sami)
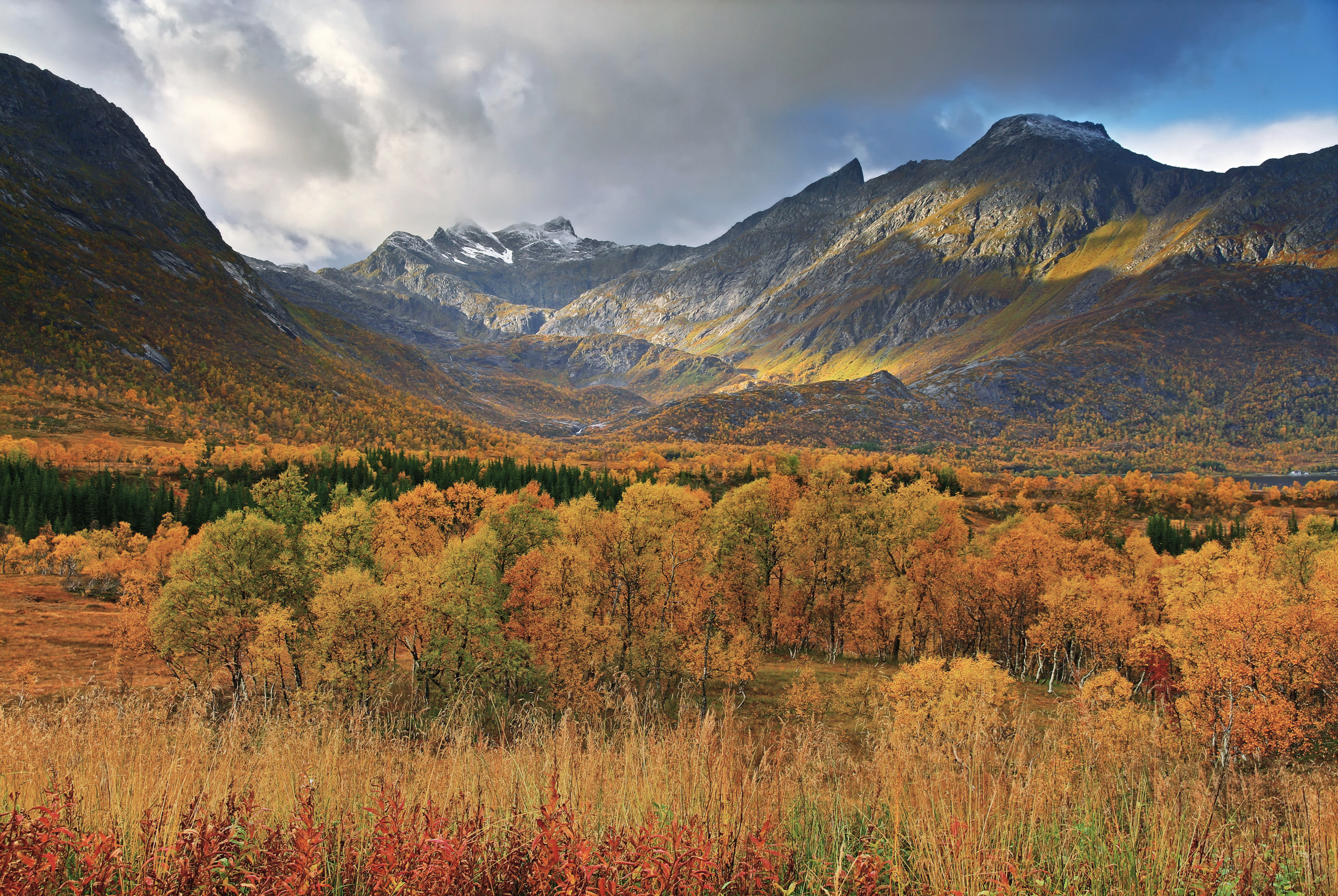
- View of Gullesfjordbotn, at the head of Gullesfjorden, partly a nature reserve
- Interactive map of Hinnøya

Geography
- Location: Northern Norway
- Coordinates: 68.3231°N 15.4039°E
- Area: 2,204.7 km^{2} (851.2 sq mi)
- Area rank: 4th in Norway (1st outside of Svalbard)
- Length: 80 km (50 mi)
- Width: 55 km (34.2 mi)
- Highest elevation: 1,262 m (4140 ft)
- Highest point: Møysalen

Administration
- Norway
- Counties: Troms and Nordland
- Municipalities: Harstad Municipality; Kvæfjord Municipality; Lødingen Municipality; Sortland Municipality; Andøy Municipality; Hadsel Municipality; Vågan Municipality; Tjeldsund Municipality
- Largest settlement: Harstad (pop. 23,242)
- Nordland county
- Area covered: 1,275 km^{2} (492 sq mi; 57.8%)
- Troms county
- Area covered: 930 km^{2} (360 sq mi; 42.2%)

Demographics
- Population: 32,688 (2017)
- Pop. density: 14.8/km^{2} (38.3/sq mi)

Hinnøya (Norwegian; Northern Sami: Iinnasuolu) is the fourth-largest island in Norway, and the largest outside the Svalbard archipelago. The 2,204.7-square-kilometre (851.2 sq mi) island lies just off the western coast of Northern Norway. The island sits on the border of Nordland and Troms counties. The western part of the island is in the district of Vesterålen, the southwestern part is in the Lofoten district, the southeastern part is in the Ofoten district, and the northeastern part is in Troms. As of 2017, Hinnøya had a population of 32,688. The only town on the island is the town of Harstad. Some of the larger villages include Borkenes, Lødingen, Sigerfjord, and Sørvik. The island is split between several municipalities: Harstad, Tjeldsund and Kvæfjord in Troms county, as well as Andøy, Hadsel, Lødingen, Sortland, and Vågan in Nordland county.

== Etymology ==
The Old Norse form of the name was just Hinn (the suffix -øya meaning "the island" was added later). The large island is almost divided in two parts by the Gullesfjorden and Øksfjorden, and the old name is probably derived from an old verb with the meaning "cleave", "split", or "cut".

== Transportation ==
Hinnøya is connected to the mainland by the Tjeldsund Bridge across the Tjeldsundet strait. To the west, it is connected to the island of Langøya by the Sortland Bridge, and to the northwest to the island of Andøya by the Andøy Bridge. It is connected to the Lofoten islands by the Lofoten mainland connection which opened on 1 December 2007. That connection is part of the European Route E10 highway. The highway runs near Møysalen National Park. There is also a ferry connection in the southeast between the village of Lødingen and the village of Bognes on the mainland, crossing the Vestfjorden.

== Geography ==
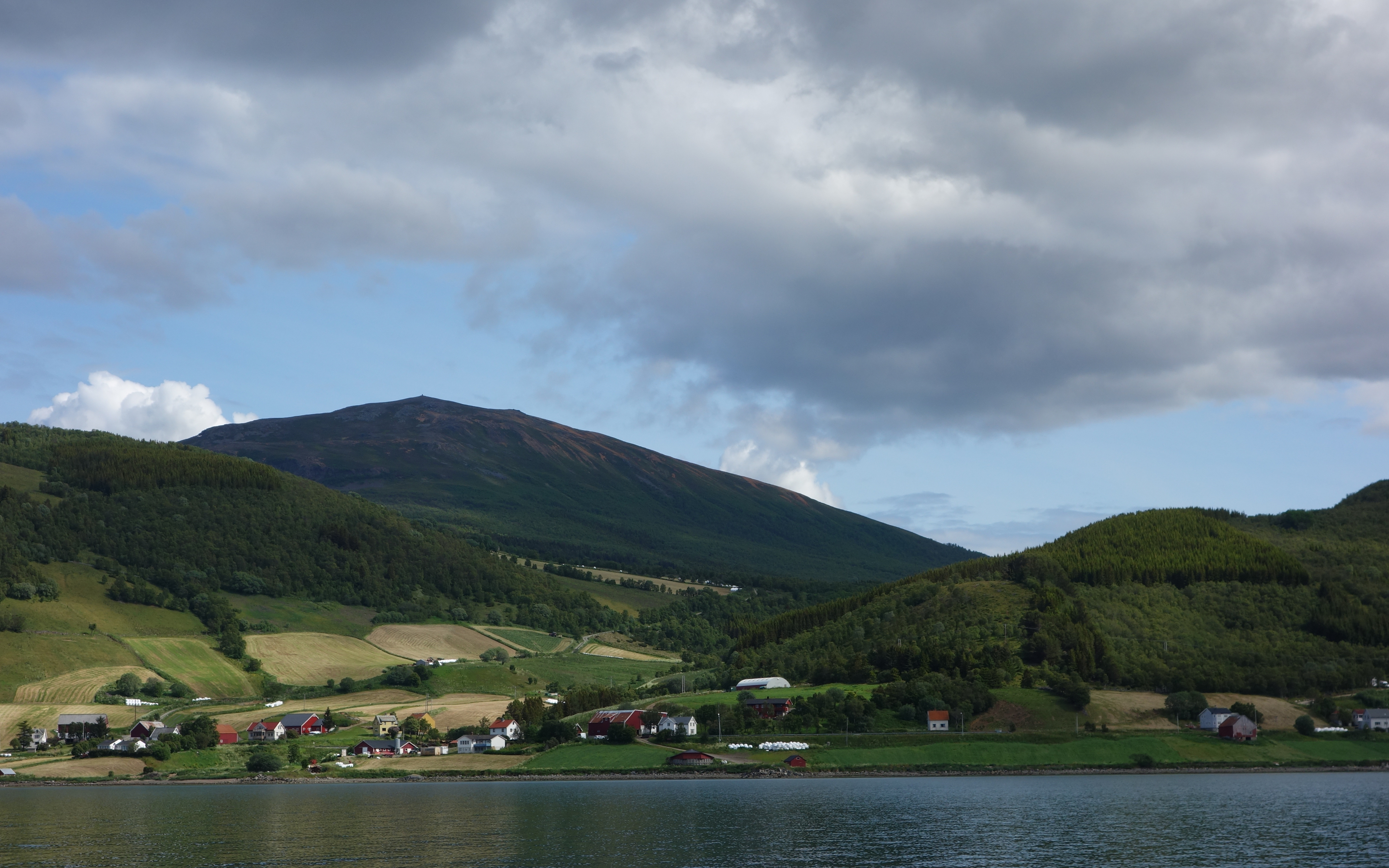
Dale, Kvæfjord, northern Hinnøya

Hinnøya is dissected by several fjords, and two very long ones, Gullesfjorden in the northeast and Øksfjorden in the southwest, almost sever the island in half. There is a five-kilometre-wide (3 mi) isthmus between innermost parts of the two fjords. Tjeldsundet sound divides Hinnøya from the mainland and from Tjeldøya; the narrow Raftsundet strait divides Hinnøya from Austvågøya and between Hinnøya and Andøya goes Risøyrenna strait. The island contains a mostly rugged and mountainous terrain, especially the southern part. There are also valleys and lakes, the largest lake is Storvatnet at 6,67 km^{2}. The treeline lies close to 400 m above sea level, but varies from 250 m to nearly 500 m above sea level.

The best agricultural area is in the northeast, in Harstad and Kvæfjord Municipalities. The southern part is the location of Møysalen National Park, which includes the highest mountain on the island, the 1,262-metre (4,140 ft) tall Møysalen. In the northwestern part of the island, near the village of Forfjord, there is a nature reserve containing a valley with forests and bogs, including the oldest pine trees in Norway, more than 700 years old.

County	Area km^{2} (sqmi)	Population (2016)
Nordland	1,275 (492)	5,938
Troms	930 (360)	26,750
Total	2,205 (851)	32,688

== Climate ==
The climate of the southern coast of the island is warmer and wetter in winter than the northern coast. Harstad, situated on the northern part of Hinnøya, has all-time high 31.7 °C (89 °F) recorded July 2014, and record low −16.1 °C (3 °F) recorded in February 2010.

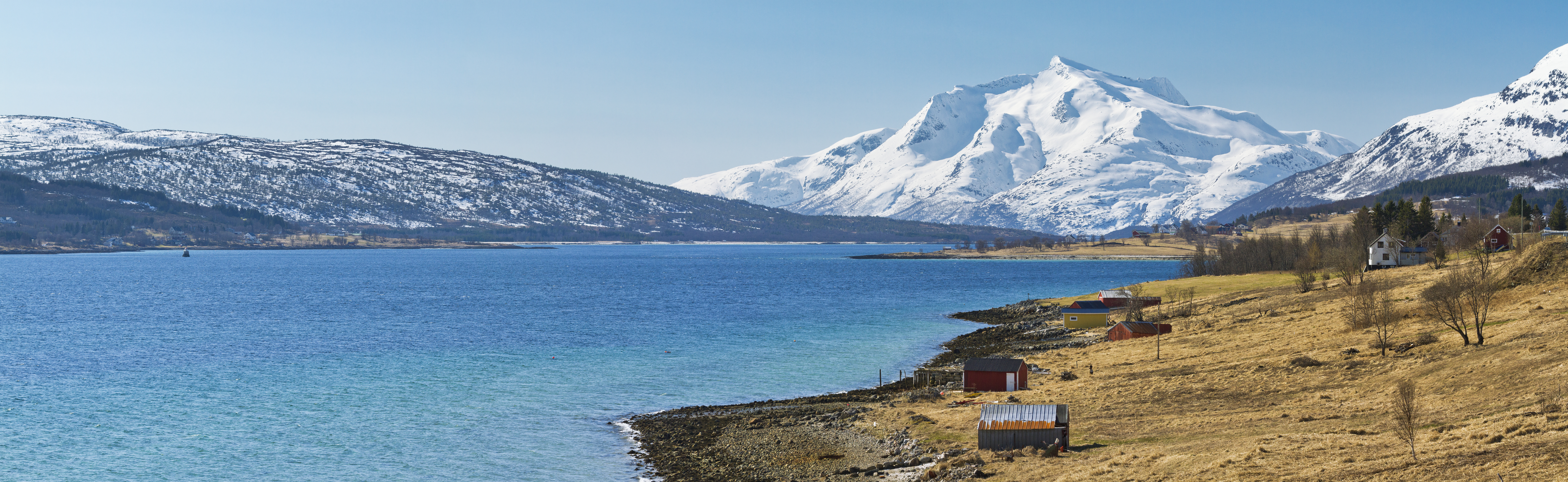
Eastern Hinnøya facing Tjeldsundet in April. The highest mountain is Strandtinden (1,076 m) on southeastern Hinnøya

Climate data for Harstad 1991-2020
Month	Jan	Feb	Mar	Apr	May	Jun	Jul	Aug	Sep	Oct	Nov	Dec	Year
Daily mean °C (°F)	−2 (28)	−2.2 (28.0)	−0.8 (30.6)	2.4 (36.3)	6.6 (43.9)	10.1 (50.2)	13.3 (55.9)	12.5 (54.5)	8.8 (47.8)	4.3 (39.7)	1.1 (34.0)	−0.8 (30.6)	4.4 (40.0)
Average precipitation mm (inches)	106 (4.2)	79 (3.1)	101 (4.0)	57 (2.2)	38 (1.5)	41 (1.6)	54 (2.1)	54 (2.1)	75 (3.0)	90 (3.5)	73 (2.9)	86 (3.4)	854 (33.6)
Source: Norwegian Meteorological Institute

== See also ==
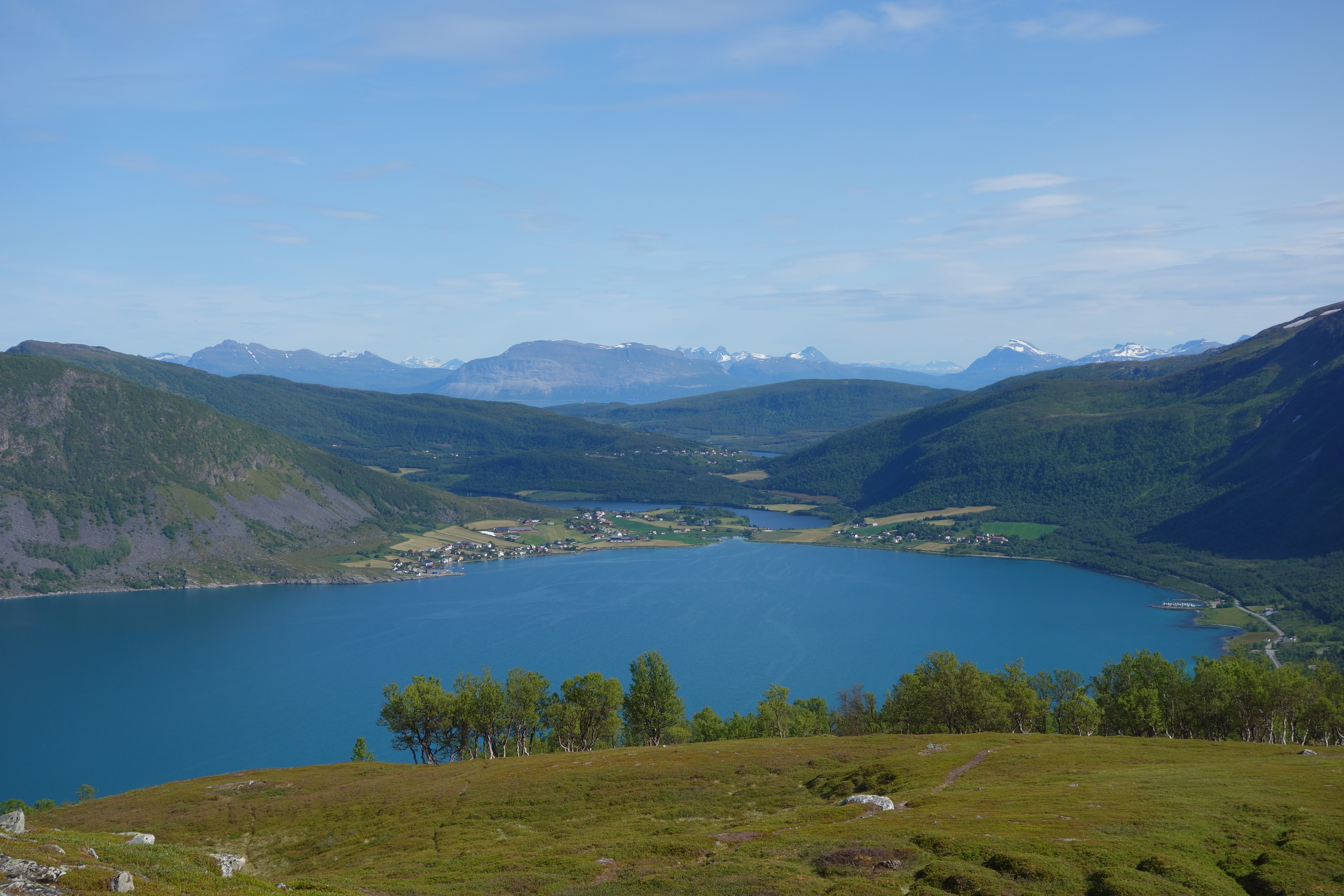
View towards Kasfjord, Harstad

- List of islands of Norway
