= Gullesfjorden =

Fjord in Troms, Norway

Gullesfjorden (Norwegian); Gollevuotna (Northern Sami)
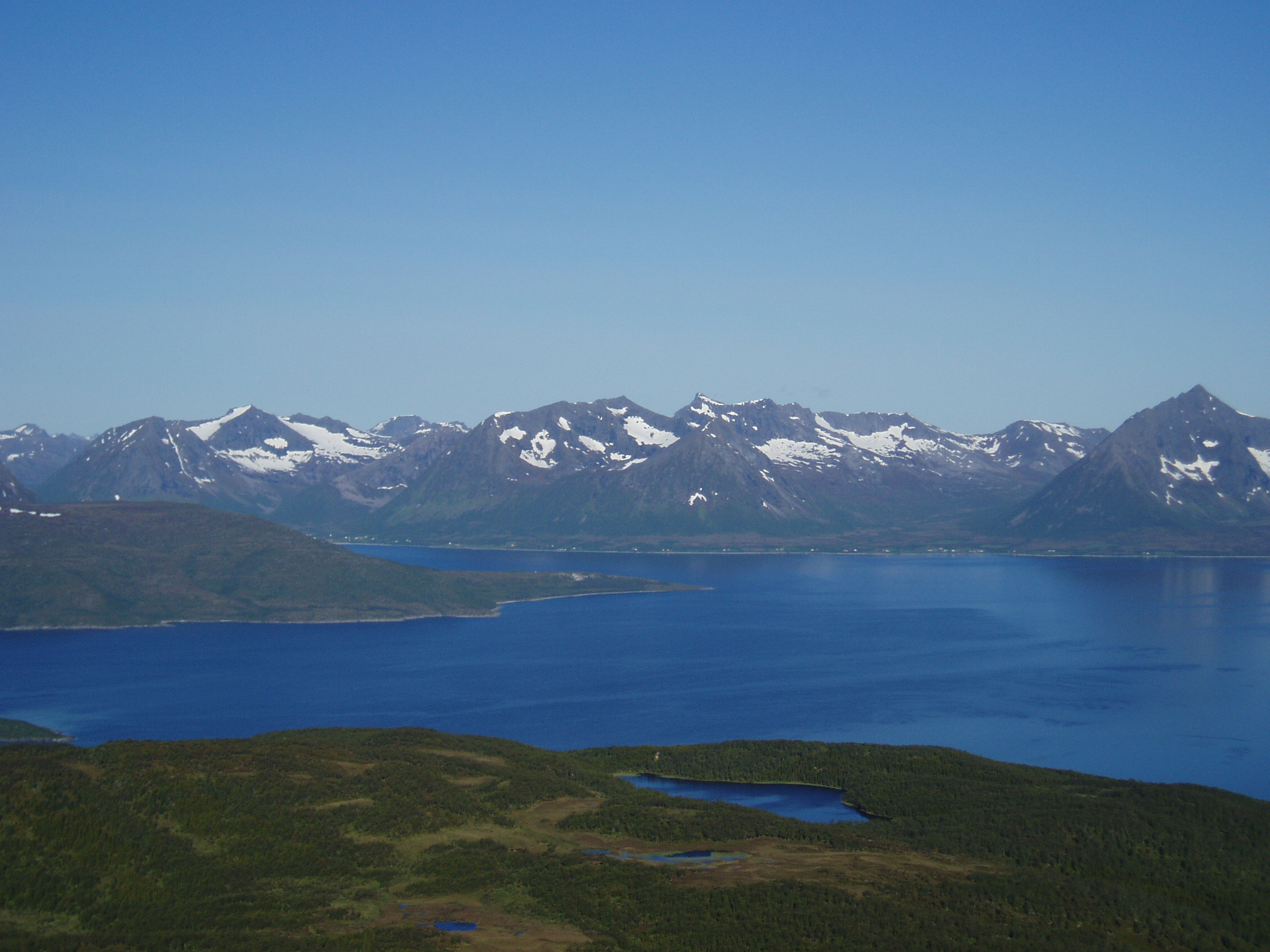
- View of the fjord (Godfjorden in back)
- Interactive map of the fjord
- Location: Troms county, Norway
- Coordinates: 68.6913°N 15.9933°E
- Type: Fjord
- Primary outflows: Andfjorden
- Basin countries: Norway
- Max. length: 35 kilometres (22 mi)

Gullesfjorden (Norwegian) or Gollevuotna (Northern Sami) is a fjord that cuts into the island of Hinnøya in Troms county, Norway. It is located mostly within Kvæfjord Municipality, although a small part in the northwestern part of the fjord lies in Sortland Municipality in Nordland county. The inner head of the fjord is known as Gullesfjordbotn.

The 35-kilometre (22 mi) long fjord is one of three which branch off of the main Andfjorden on the north side of Hinnøya. The other two branches are the Godfjorden and Kvæfjorden. The Gullesfjorden has a smaller feeder fjord entering from the southwest called Austerfjorden.
