= Langenes Municipality =

Former municipality in Nordland, Norway

Langenes Municipality Langenes herred
- Former municipality
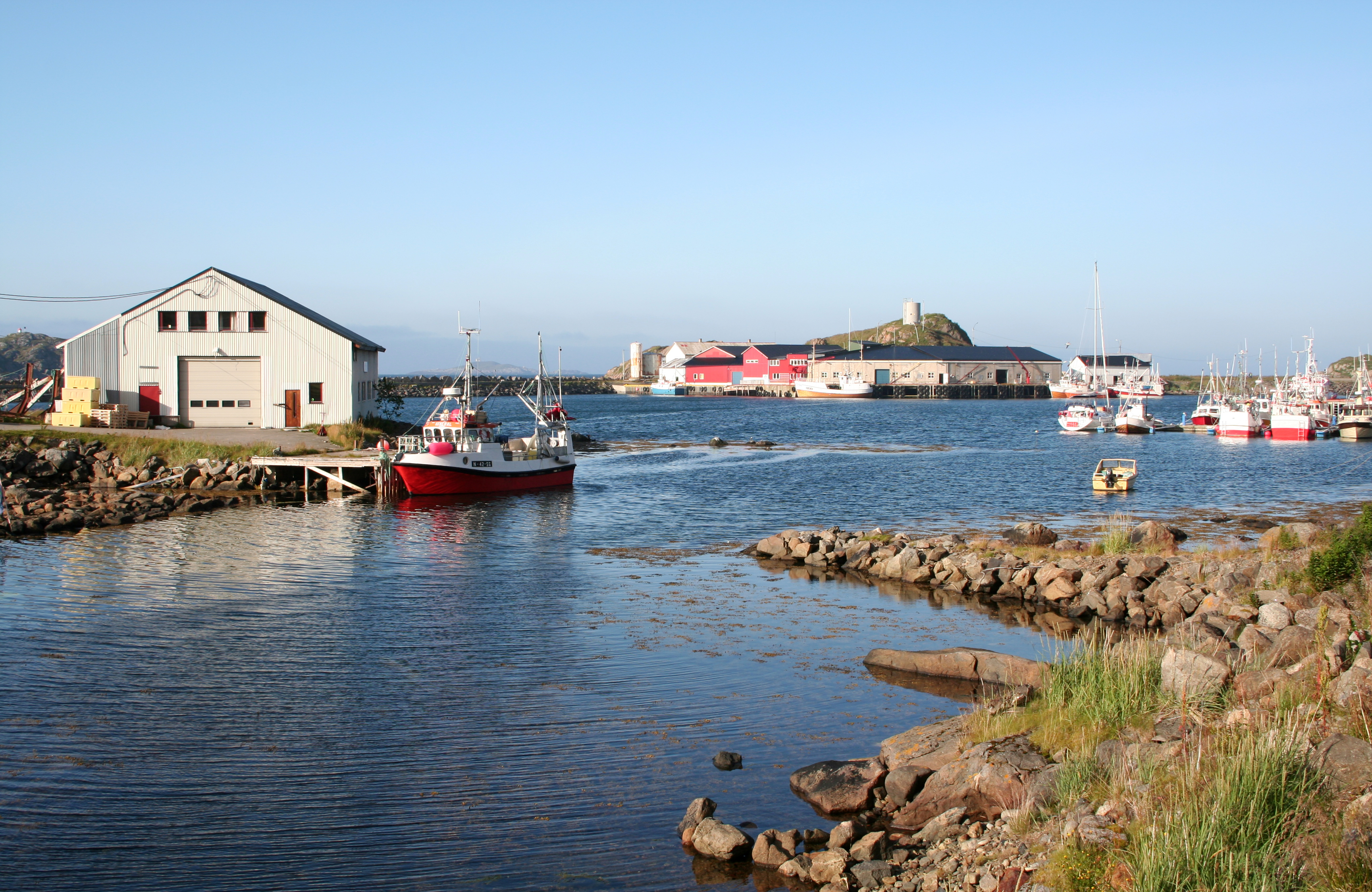
- View of the village harbour of Stø

- Nordland within Norway

- Langenes within Nordland
- Coordinates: 69°01′07″N 15°09′21″E
- Country: Norway
- County: Nordland
- District: Vesterålen
- Established: 1 Jan 1919
  - Preceded by: Øksnes Municipality
- Disestablished: 1 Jan 1964
  - Succeeded by: Øksnes Municipality
- Administrative centre: Stø

Government
  - Mayor (1955-1963): Otto Holm (Ap)

Area (upon dissolution)
  - Total: 103.4 km^{2} (39.9 sq mi)
  - Rank: #513 in Norway
- Highest elevation: 762.46 m (2,501.5 ft)

Population (1963)
  - Total: 2,040
  - Rank: #428 in Norway
  - Density: 19.7/km^{2} (51/sq mi)
  - Change (10 years): ▲ +5.8%
- Demonym(s): Langnesfjerding; Langenesfjerding

Official language
  - Norwegian form: Bokmål
- Time zone: UTC+01:00 (CET)
  - Summer (DST): UTC+02:00 (CEST)
- ISO 3166 code: NO-1869

Langenes is a former municipality in Nordland county, Norway. The municipality, which existed from 1919 until 1964, encompassed the western shore of the Gavlfjorden in what is now Øksnes Municipality. It is located on the northern end of the large island of Langøya in the Vesterålen archipelago. The administrative centre was in the village of Stø, just east of the Langenes Church in the northern part of the municipality.

== General information ==
The municipality of Langenes was established on 1 July 1919 when the northeastern part of Øksnes Municipality was split off from Øksnes to form the new municipality. Initially, Langenes had a population of 1,085. During the 1960s, there were many municipal mergers across Norway due to the work of the Schei Committee. On 1 January 1963, the Holm area along the Gavlfjorden (population: 65) was transferred from Langenes Municipality to Sortland Municipality. On 1 January 1964, the rest of Langenes (population: 2,037) was merged back together with Øksnes Municipality. Prior to the merger, Langenes had 2,037 residents.

=== Name ===
The municipality is named after the old Langenes farm (Old Norse: Langøyjarnes) since the first Langenes Church was built there. The first element is lang which means "long", here referring to the island, Langøya on which the municipality was located. The island's name, Langøya, is directly translated as "the long island". The last element is nes which means "headland". The municipality was located on the northernmost peninsula on the island thus the name Langenes means the "headland on Langøya".

=== Churches ===
The Church of Norway had one parish (sokn) within Langenes Municipality. At the time of the municipal dissolution, it was part of the Øksnes prestegjeld and the Vesterålen prosti (deanery) in the Diocese of Sør-Hålogaland.

Churches in Langenes Municipality
Parish (sokn)	Church name	Location of the church	Year built
Langenes	Langenes Church	Stø	1500s
Langenes	Alsvåg Church	Alsvåg	1923

== Geography ==
Langenes Municipality was located on the island of Langøya, along with many other smaller islets and skerries just off shore. Øksnes Municipality was located to the west, Sortland Municipality was located to the south, and Bjørnskinn Municipality was located to the east, across the Gavlfjorden, on the island of Andøya. The highest point in the municipality is the 762.46-metre (2,501.5 ft) tall mountain Snøkolla, located on the border with Øksnes Municipality.

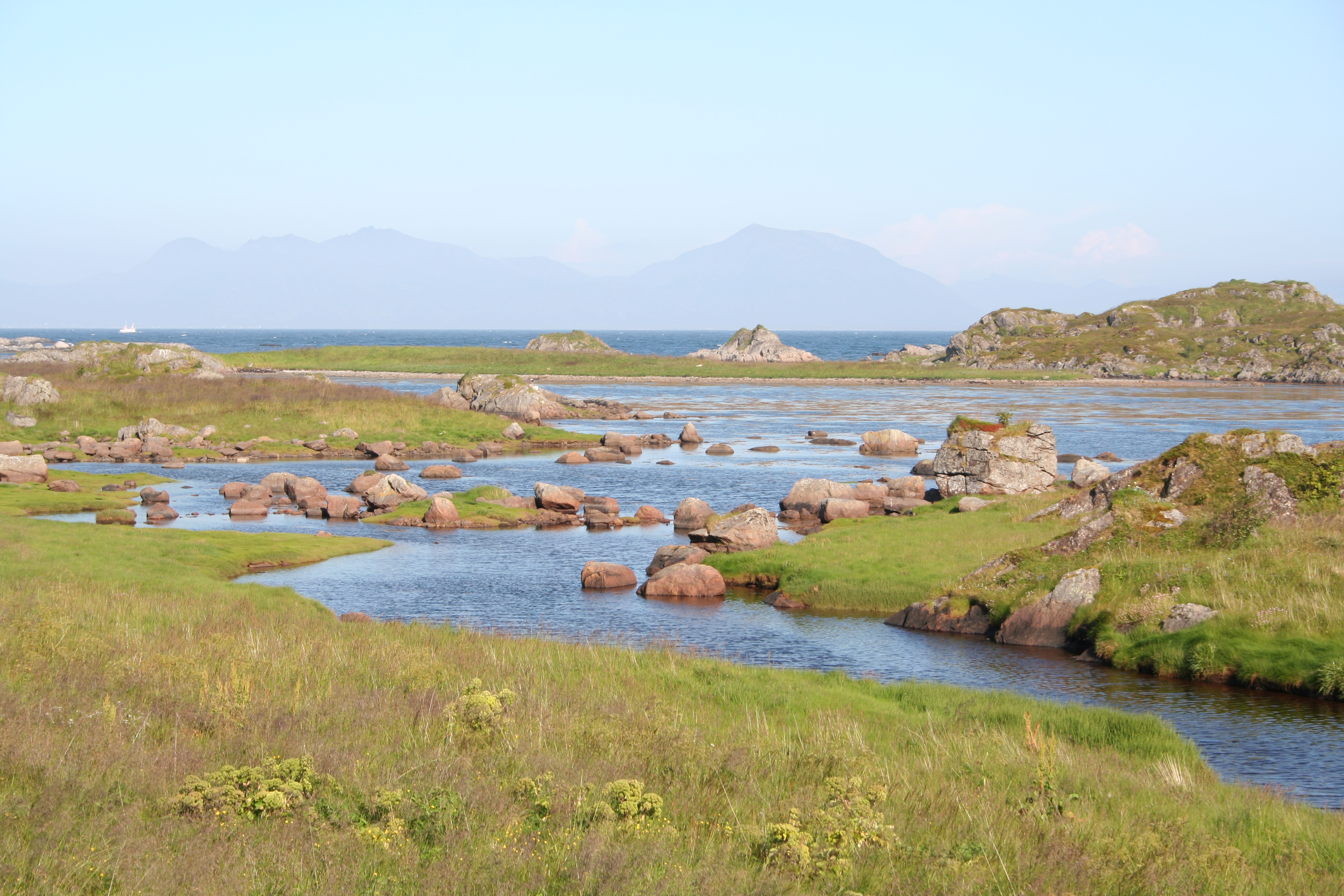
Area near Langenes Church

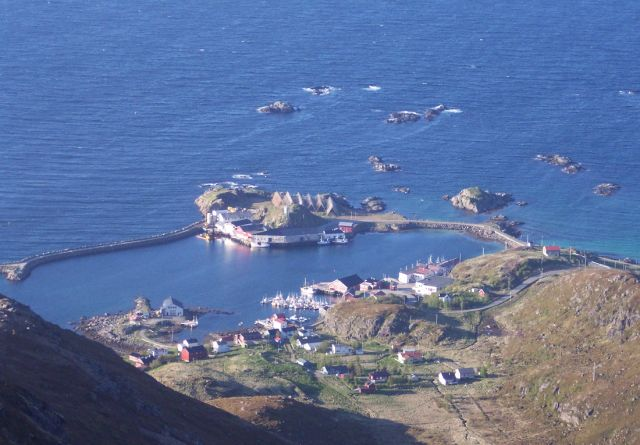
Harbour at Stø

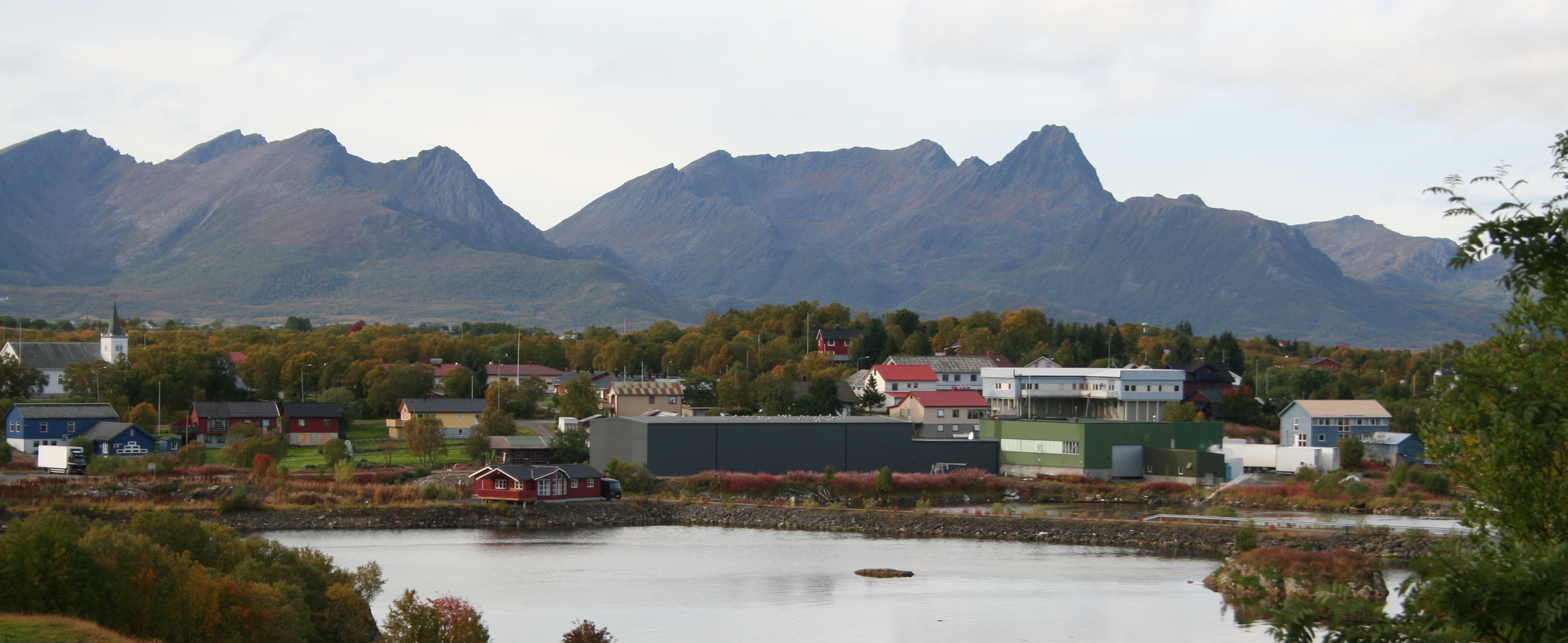
View of the village of Alsvåg

== Government ==
While it existed, Langenes Municipality was responsible for primary education (through 10th grade), outpatient health services, senior citizen services, welfare and other social services, zoning, economic development, and municipal roads and utilities. The municipality was governed by a municipal council of directly elected representatives. The mayor was indirectly elected by a vote of the municipal council. The municipality was under the jurisdiction of the Hålogaland Court of Appeal.

=== Municipal council ===
The municipal council (Herredsstyre) of Langenes Municipality was made up of representatives that were elected to four year terms. The party breakdown of the final municipal council was as follows:

Langenes herredsstyre 1959–1963
Party name (in Norwegian)	Number of representatives
Labour Party (Arbeiderpartiet)	5
Christian Democratic Party (Kristelig Folkeparti)	4
List of workers, fishermen, and small farmholders (Arbeidere, fiskere, småbrukere liste)	1
Joint List(s) of Non-Socialist Parties (Borgerlige Felleslister)	3
Total number of members:	13
Note: On 1 January 1964, Langenes Municipality became part of Øksnes Municipality.

Langenes herredsstyre 1955–1959
Party name (in Norwegian)	Number of representatives
Labour Party (Arbeiderpartiet)	7
Christian Democratic Party (Kristelig Folkeparti)	3
Joint List(s) of Non-Socialist Parties (Borgerlige Felleslister)	2
Local List(s) (Lokale lister)	1
Total number of members:	13

Langenes herredsstyre 1951–1955
Party name (in Norwegian)	Number of representatives
Labour Party (Arbeiderpartiet)	5
Conservative Party (Høyre)	2
Christian Democratic Party (Kristelig Folkeparti)	4
Liberal Party (Venstre)	1
Total number of members:	12

Langenes herredsstyre 1947–1951
Party name (in Norwegian)	Number of representatives
Local List(s) (Lokale lister)	12
Total number of members:	12

Langenes herredsstyre 1945–1947
Party name (in Norwegian)	Number of representatives
Local List(s) (Lokale lister)	12
Total number of members:	12

Langenes herredsstyre 1937–1941*
Party name (in Norwegian)	Number of representatives
Local List(s) (Lokale lister)	12
Total number of members:	12
Note: Due to the German occupation of Norway during World War II, no elections were held for new municipal councils until after the war ended in 1945.

=== Mayors ===
The mayor (Norwegian: ordfører) of Langenes Municipality was the political leader of the municipality and the chairperson of the municipal council. Here is a list of people who have held this position:

- 1919–1919: S. Skog
- 1920–1922: Lars Olson Standahl
- 1923–1925: Lorents Bendik Olsen Sæther
- 1925–1928: S. Skog
- 1928–1934: Lorents Bendik Olsen Sæther
- 1935–1943: L.H. Nielsen (H)
- 1943–1945: Olav Meløy
- 1945–1945: Kristian Holm
- 1946–1955: Julius Kristian Pettersen Meløy (KrF)
- 1955–1963: Otto Holm (Ap)

== See also ==
- List of former municipalities of Norway
