= Barkestad =

Village in Øksnes Municipality, Norway

- Village
- Interactive map of Barkestad
- Location within Nordland Location within Norway
- Coordinates: 68.8179°N 14.7993°E
- Country: Norway
- Region: Northern Norway
- County: Nordland
- District: Vesterålen
- Municipality: Øksnes Municipality
- Elevation: 8 m (26 ft)
- Time zone: UTC+01:00 (CET)
  - Summer (DST): UTC+02:00 (CEST)
- Post Code: 8426 Barkestad

Barkestad is a small fishing village in Øksnes Municipality in Nordland county, Norway. It is located on the southwest side of the island of Dyrøya in the Vesterålen archipelago. The village is located about 5 kilometres (3.1 mi) off the west coast of the main island of Langøya. There are regular ferry stops at Barkestad with connections to other nearby islands and to the municipal centre of Myre, located about 15 kilometres (9.3 mi) to the northeast. There are only four residents of the village (in 2017) after many years of population decline. They are the only permanent residents of the whole island.
