= Øksnes =

Øksnes may refer to:

== Places ==
- Øksnes Municipality, a municipality in Nordland county, Norway
- Øksnes Church, a church in Øksnes Municipality in Nordland county, Norway
- Øksnes, Trøndelag, a village in Steinkjer Municipality in Trøndelag county, Norway

== People ==
- Erik Øksnes (1930-1998), a Norwegian actor
- Oskar Øksnes (1921-1999), a Norwegian politician for the Labour Party
