= Skogsøya =

Island in Nordland, Norway

Skogsøya Skogsøy
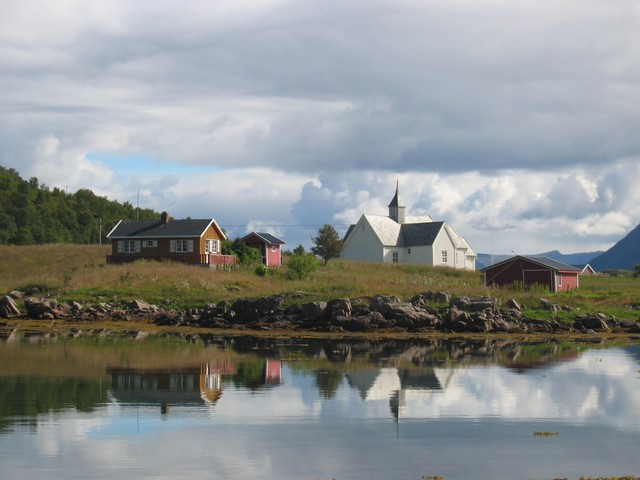
- Interactive map of Skogsøya; Skogsøy

Geography
- Location: Nordland, Norway
- Coordinates: 68.8996°N 14.9212°E
- Archipelago: Vesterålen
- Area: 32.5 km^{2} (12.5 sq mi)
- Length: 7.5 km (4.66 mi)
- Width: 6 km (3.7 mi)
- Highest elevation: 707 m (2320 ft)
- Highest point: Sørsandtinden

Administration
- Norway
- County: Nordland
- Municipality: Øksnes Municipality

Skogsøya is an island in Øksnes Municipality in Nordland county, Norway. The island lies off the west coast of the large island of Langøya, just 3 kilometres (1.9 mi) west of the village of Myre. The highest point on the island is the 707-metre (2,320 ft) tall mountain Sørsandtinden.

The 32.5-square-kilometre (12.5 sq mi) island has just 26 residents on it (in 2017), down from a high of several hundred residents in the 1930s. Most of the population lives along the southern coast of the island, where the historic Øksnes Church is located. The municipal administration for Øksnes Municipality was historically located on this island, but it was moved to the village of Myre on the main island of Langøya during the 20th century.

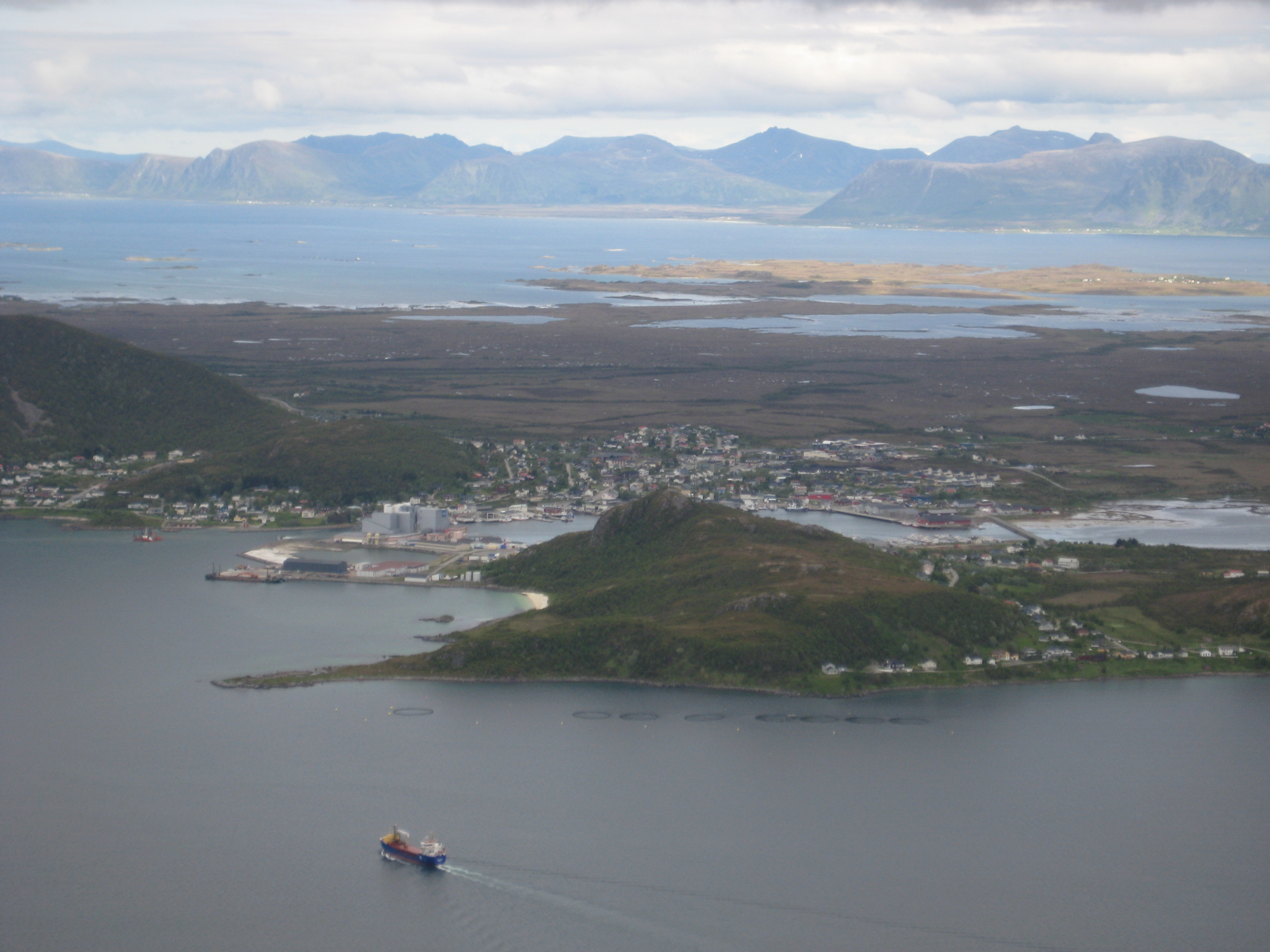
Looking at Myre from Øksnesheia (on Skogsøya).

== See also ==
- List of islands of Norway
