= Alsvågvatnet =

Lake in Nordland, Norway

- Interactive map of Alsvågvatnet
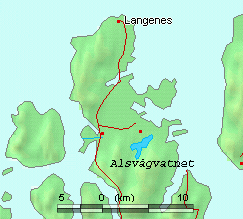
- Map of Alsvågvatnet and surrounds
- Location: Nordland
- Coordinates: 68.8945°N 15.1904°E
- Type: Natural lake
- Basin countries: Norway
- Max. length: 4.3 kilometres (2.7 mi)
- Max. width: 1 kilometre (0.62 mi)
- Surface area: 2.36 km^{2} (0.91 sq mi)
- Shore length^{1}: 18 kilometres (11 mi)
- Surface elevation: 8 metres (26 ft)
- References: NVE
- ^{1} Shore length is not a well-defined measure.

Alsvågvatnet is a lake which lies in Øksnes Municipality in Nordland county, Norway. It is located on the island of Langøya in the Vesterålen archipelago. There is birch woodland and bogland nearby. The 2.36-square-kilometre (0.91 sq mi) lake sits at an elevation of 8 metres (26 ft) above sea level, about 1.3 kilometres (0.81 mi) west of the village of Alsvåg, along the road to Myre.
