= Nyksund =

Village in Øksnes Municipality, Norway

- Village
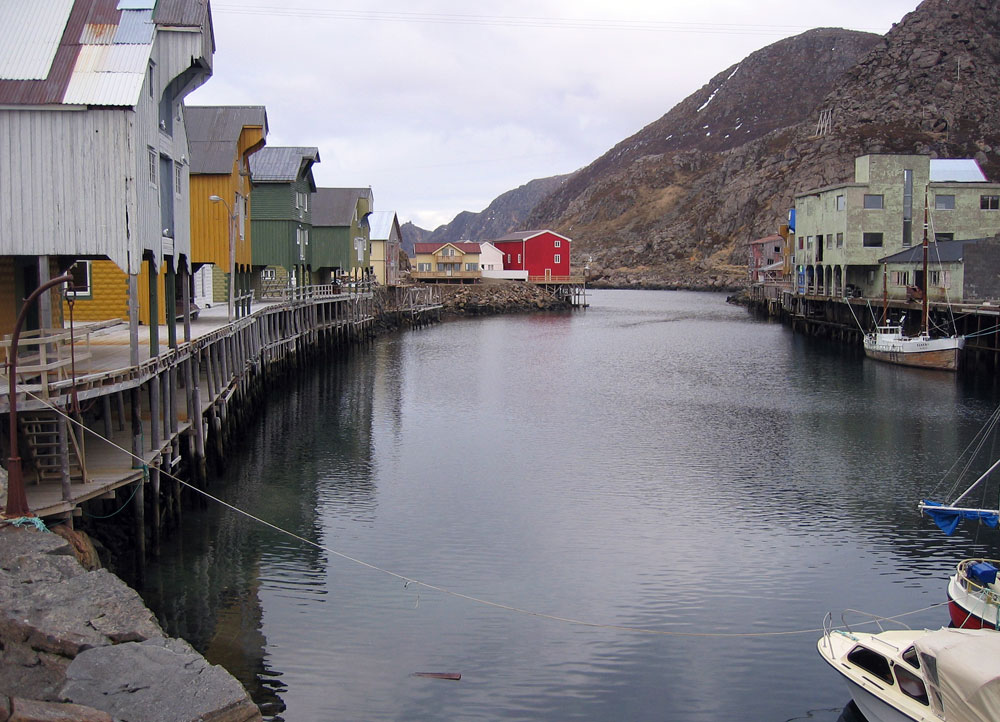
- View of the village harbour
- Interactive map of Nyksund
- Location within Nordland Location within Norway
- Coordinates: 68.9958°N 15.0135°E
- Country: Norway
- Region: Northern Norway
- County: Nordland
- District: Vesterålen
- Municipality: Øksnes Municipality
- Elevation: 6 m (20 ft)
- Time zone: UTC+01:00 (CET)
  - Summer (DST): UTC+02:00 (CEST)
- Post Code: 8430 Myre

Nyksund is a coastal fishing village in Øksnes Municipality in Nordland county, Norway. It is located on the northern part of the island of Langøya in the Vesterålen archipelago about 5 kilometres (3.1 mi) southeast of the village of Stø (although there is no direct road connection). The only road connection to the isolated village of Nyksund is from the south, coming from the village of Myre, about 10 kilometres (6.2 mi) away.

== History ==
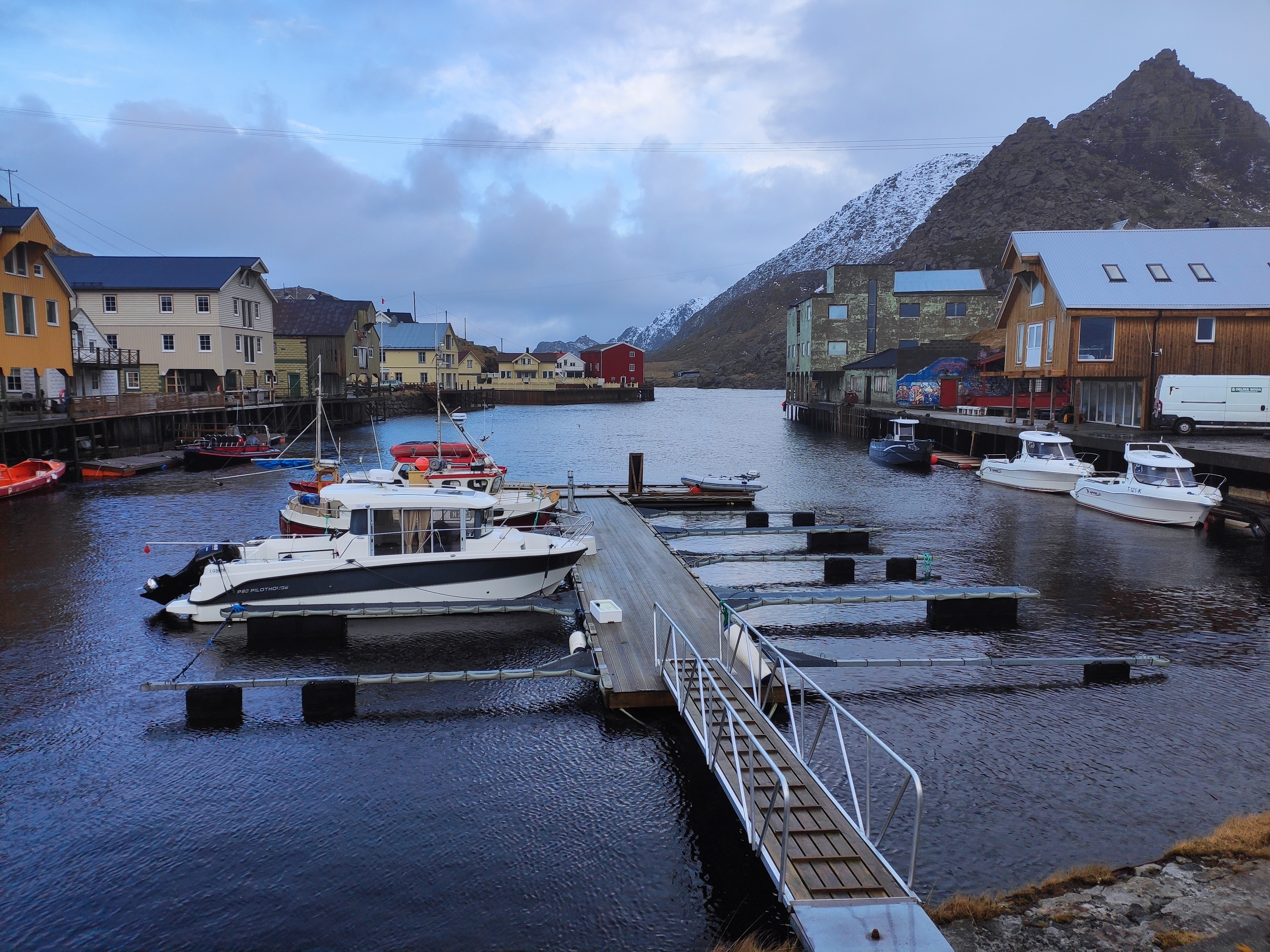
Nyksund in 2020

People have been living in Nyksund since before recorded history. Until the late 18th century, the population was scarce, but with the rise of commercial trade, Nyksund became an important centre for hundreds of fishermen coming to exploit the rich cod fisheries nearby.

As bigger vessels and road transportation rendered the port obsolete due to its shallow waters and poor road, Nyksund became an isolated outpost with a dwindling population. Finally, measures were made to shut the place down. During the 1970s, the city became a ghost town.

With the turn of the 21st century, after 30 years of erosion, the lights were turned back on in Nyksund. New citizens found the old houses worthwhile. In 2003, the main obstacle to new activity in Nyksund was inadequate infrastructure—be it roads, postal service, or utility services. Modern Nyksund boasts a summer population of 30 to 40 people and about a half-dozen hardy souls remain throughout the harsh winters.
