= Gavlfjorden =

Fjord in Nordland, Norway

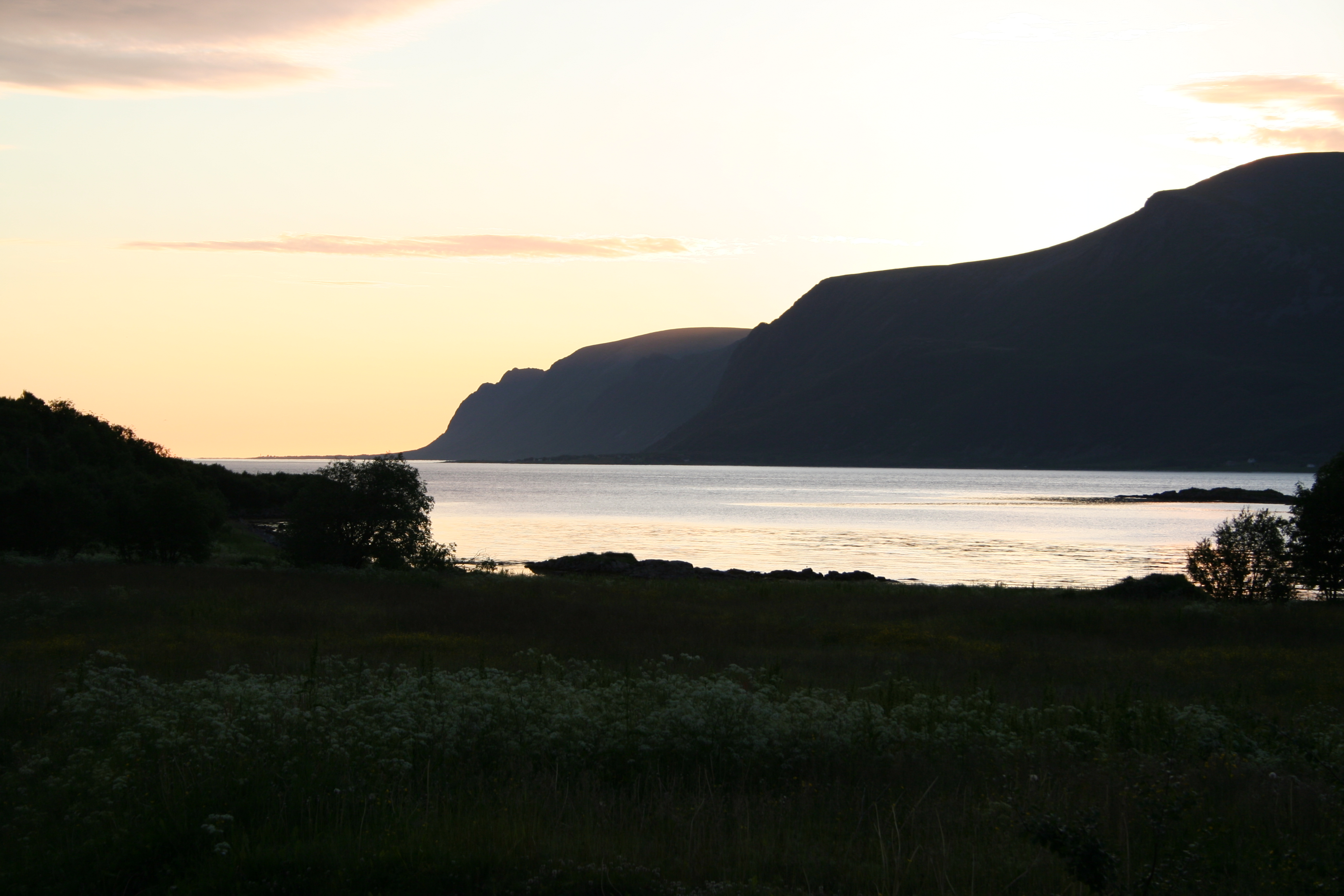
- View of the fjord (looking east towards Andøya)
- Interactive map of the fjord
- Location: Nordland county, Norway
- Coordinates: 68.9464°N 15.3850°E
- Type: Fjord
- Basin countries: Norway
- Max. length: 20 kilometres (12 mi)
- Max. width: 11 kilometres (6.8 mi)
- Settlements: Alsvåg

Gavlfjorden is a fjord (more accurately, a sound) in Nordland county, Norway. The 20-kilometre (12 mi) long fjord separates the large islands of Langøya and Andøya in the Vesterålen archipelago and it runs along the border of three municipalities: Øksnes, Andøy, and Sortland. In the north, the fjord flows out into the Norwegian Sea, and in the south, the fjord splits into the Sortlandssundet strait and the Risøysundet strait.

== See also ==
- List of Norwegian fjords
