= Finn Knutsen =

Norwegian politician (1932–2021)

- Born: 18 February 1932; Langenes, Norway
- Died: 14 February 2021 (aged 88)
- Occupation: Politician
- Political party: Labour Party of Norway
- Awards: King's Medal of Merit (2000)

Finn Knutsen (18 February 1932 – 14 February 2021) was a Norwegian politician.

== Career ==
Knutsen was born in Langenes Municipality to Ole and Unni Knudsen. He was elected representative to the Storting for Nordland for the period 1985–1989 for the Labour Party. He was a member of the municipal council of Øksnes Municipality from 1955 to 1987 (serving as mayor from 1967 to 1973) and 1991 to 1999 (again serving as mayor) and of Nordland county council from 1967 to 1979. He was awarded the King's Medal of Merit in 2000.

Knutsen died on 14 February 2021, four days short of his 89th birthday.
