= Øksnesavisa =

Norwegian newspaper

Øksnesavisa (lit. 'the Øksnes Gazette') is a local Norwegian newspaper published in Myre in Nordland county, covering events in Øksnes Municipality. The paper is edited by Hjalmar Martinussen. It was founded in 1991 and it is published every Friday. Øksnesavisa is printed by the company K. Nordahls Trykkeri in Sortland.

== Circulation ==
According to the Norwegian Audit Bureau of Circulations and National Association of Local Newspapers, Øksnesavisa has had the following annual circulation:

- 2004: 1,748
- 2005: 1,801
- 2006: 1,768
- 2007: 1,842
- 2008: 1,694
- 2009: 1,657
- 2010: 1,695
- 2011: 1,724
- 2012: 1,655
- 2013: 1,672
- 2014: 1,619
- 2015: 1,511
- 2016: 1,583
