= Alsvåg =

Village in Øksnes Municipality, Norway

- Village
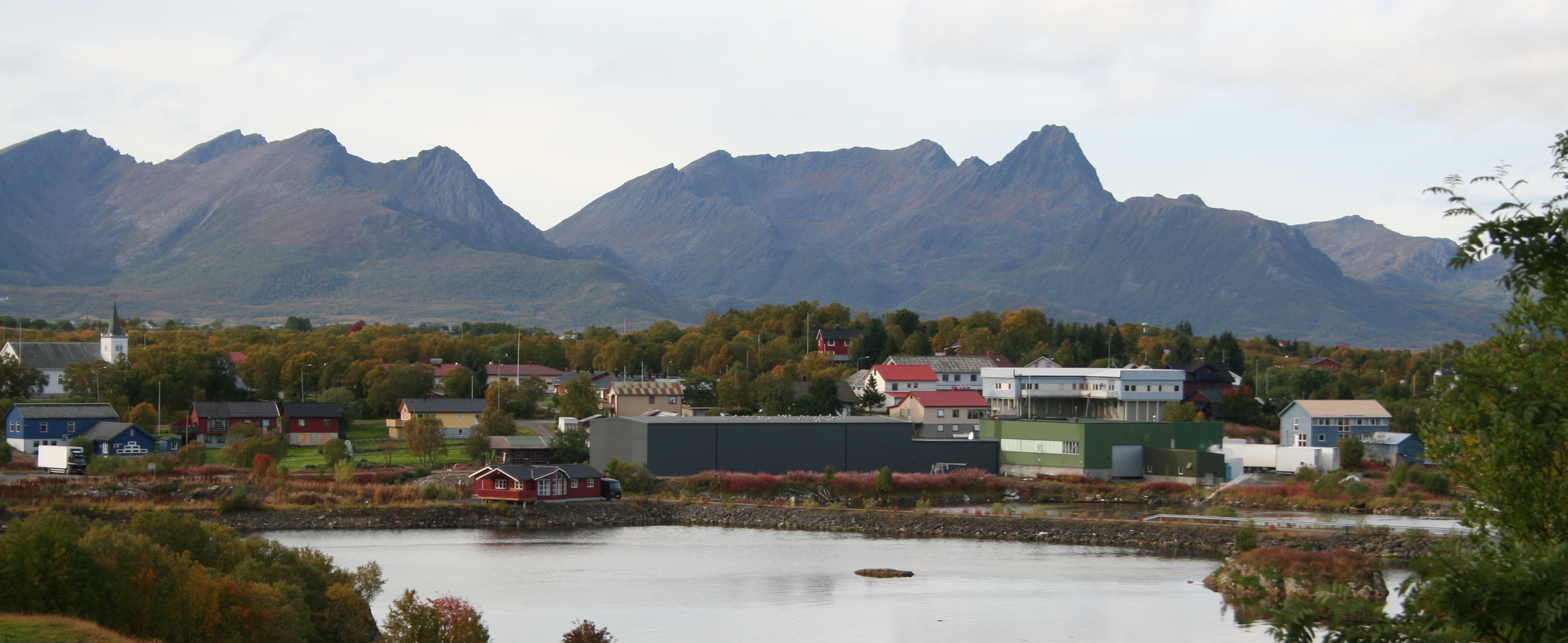
- View of the village
- Interactive map of Alsvåg
- Location within Nordland Location within Norway
- Coordinates: 68.9019°N 15.2797°E
- Country: Norway
- Region: Northern Norway
- County: Nordland
- District: Vesterålen
- Municipality: Øksnes Municipality

Area
  - Total: 0.34 km^{2} (0.13 sq mi)
- Elevation: 10 m (33 ft)

Population (2023)
  - Total: 301
  - Density: 885/km^{2} (2,290/sq mi)
- Time zone: UTC+01:00 (CET)
  - Summer (DST): UTC+02:00 (CEST)
- Post Code: 8432 Alsvåg
- Climate: Cfc

Alsvåg is a village in Øksnes Municipality in Nordland county, Norway. It is located on the western bank of the Gavlfjorden on the island of Langøya and about 8 kilometres (5.0 mi) east of the municipal centre of Myre. Alsvåg Church is located in this village.

The 0.34-square-kilometre (84-acre) village has a population (2023) of 301 and a population density of 885 inhabitants per square kilometre (2,290/sq mi).
