= Alsvåg Church =

- Alsvåg kirke
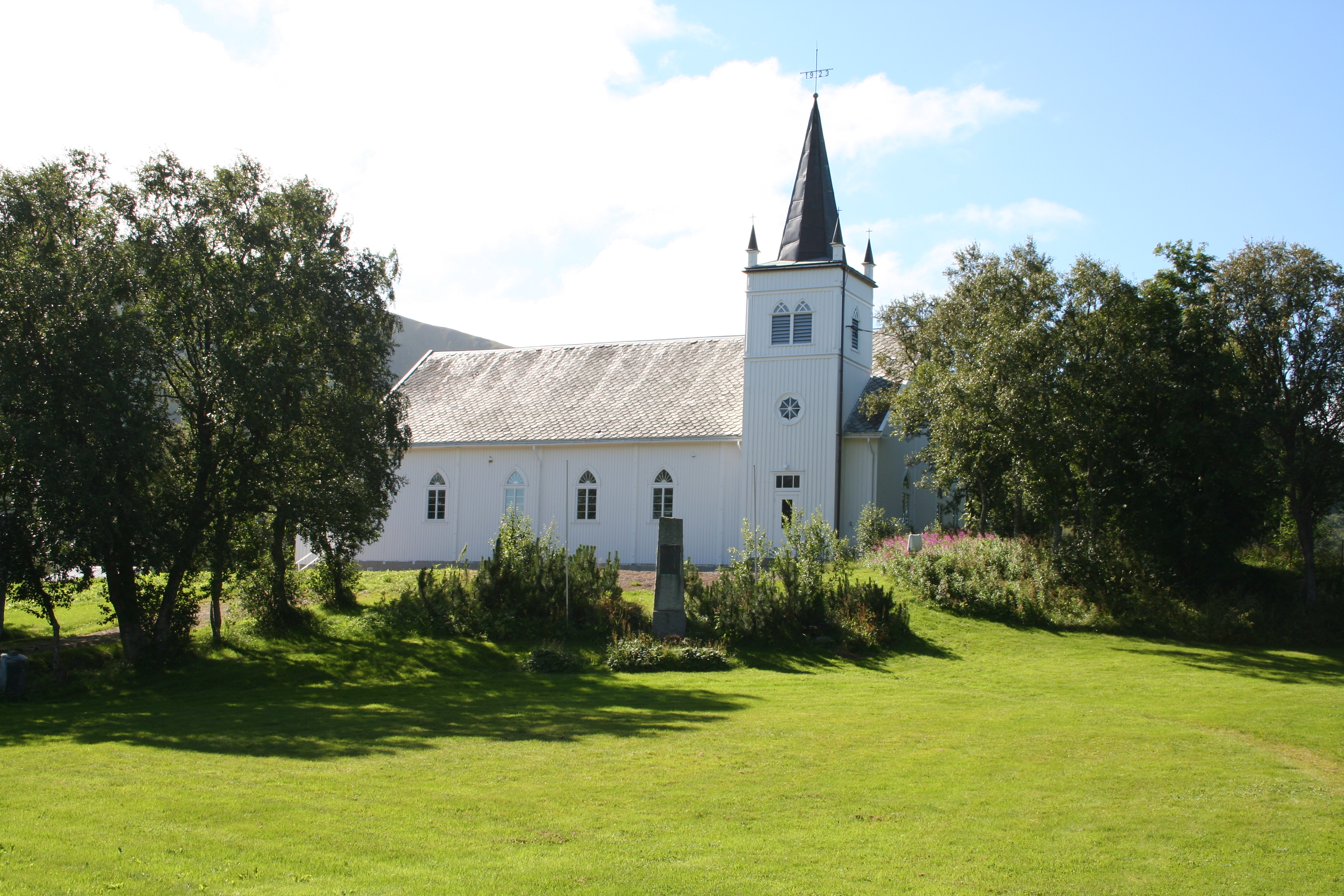
- View of the church
- Alsvåg Church
- 68.90021039°N 15.27687415°E
- Location: Øksnes Municipality, Nordland
- Country: Norway
- Denomination: Church of Norway
- Churchmanship: Evangelical Lutheran

History
- Status: Parish church
- Founded: 1923
- Consecrated: 1949

Architecture
- Functional status: Active
- Architect: R. Randulf
- Architectural type: Long church
- Completed: 1923 (103 years ago)

Specifications
- Capacity: 210
- Materials: Wood

Administration
- Diocese: Sør-Hålogaland
- Deanery: Vesterålen prosti
- Parish: Øksnes
- Norwegian Cultural Heritage Site
- Type: Church
- Status: Not protected
- ID: 83772

Alsvåg Church (Norwegian: Alsvåg kirke) is a parish church of the Church of Norway in Øksnes Municipality in Nordland county, Norway. It is located in the village of Alsvåg on the island of Langøya. It is one of the churches for the Øksnes parish which is part of the Vesterålen prosti (deanery) in the Diocese of Sør-Hålogaland. The white, wooden church was built in a long church style in 1923 using plans drawn up by the architect R. Randulf. The church seats about 300 people.

== History ==
The building was originally constructed in 1923 as an annex chapel. In 1949, the building was upgraded and renovated to gain parish church status. It was consecrated that same year. The church was renovated in 2009.

== Media gallery ==
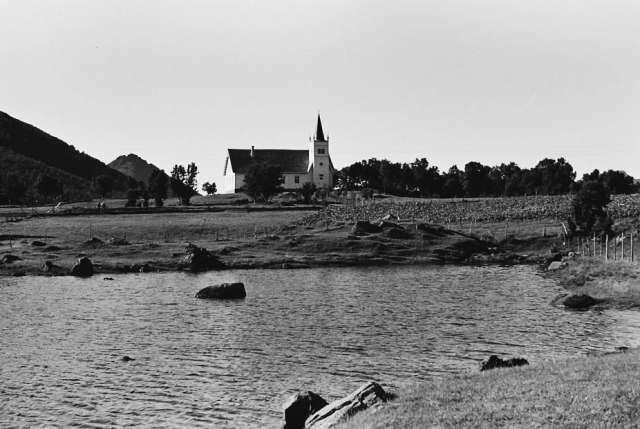

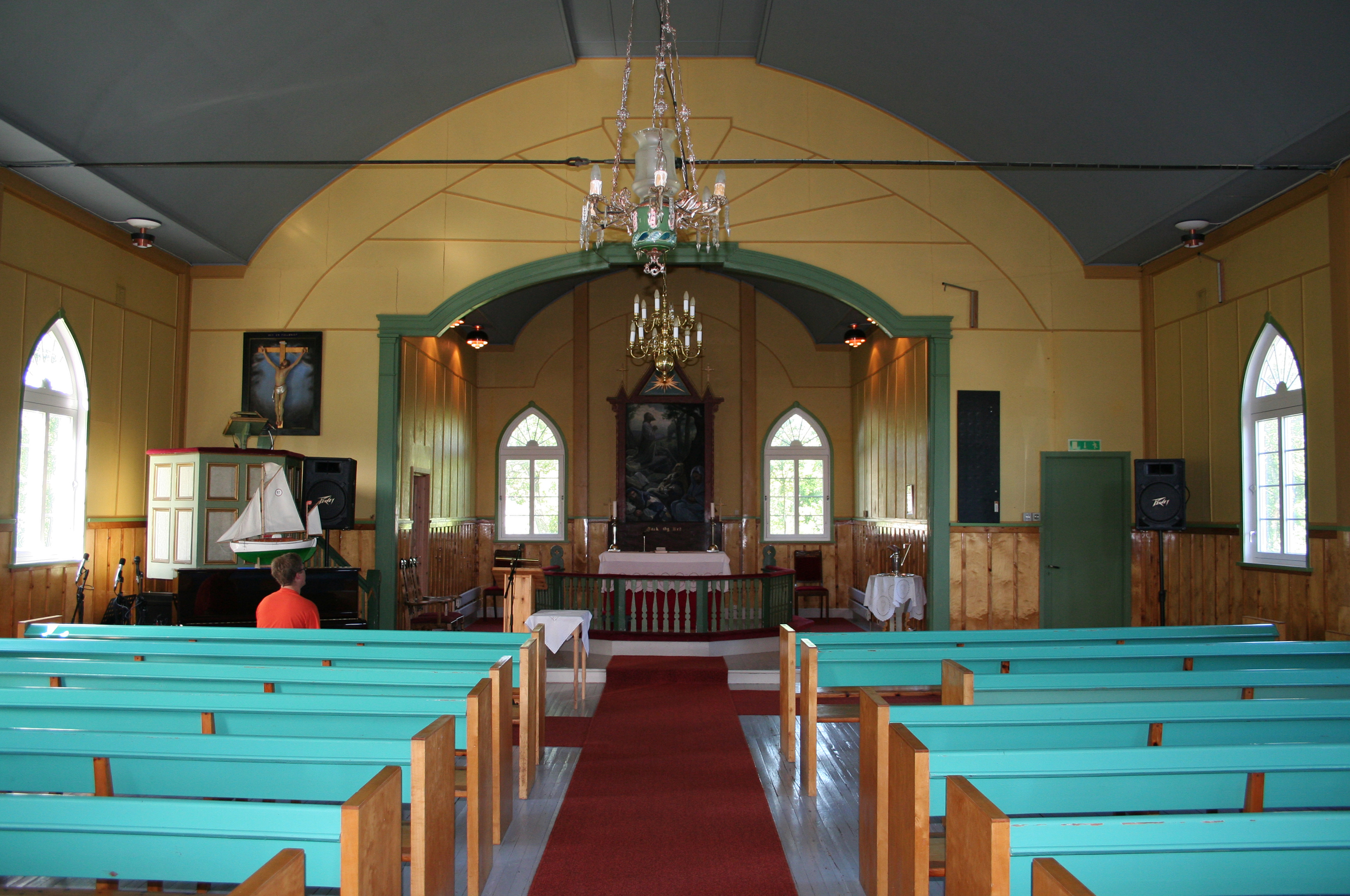

== See also ==
- List of churches in Sør-Hålogaland
