= Snøkolla =

Mountain in Nordland, Norway

- Snykolla
- Interactive map of the mountain

Highest point
- Elevation: 763 m (2,503 ft)
- Prominence: 763 m (2,503 ft)
- Coordinates: 68.8402°N 15.1926°E

Geography
- Location: Nordland, Norway

Snøkolla is the highest mountain on the island of Langøya (the third largest island on the mainland of Norway). The mountain is located in Øksnes Municipality in Nordland county. The 763-metre (2,503 ft) tall mountain sits about 10 kilometres (6.2 mi) southeast of the village of Myre.
