= Lydolf Lind Meløy =

Norwegian politician

Lydolf Lind Meløy (11 April 1908 – 25 May 1999) was a Norwegian educator, trade unionist, and politician for the Liberal Party.

He was born in Meløya (part of Øksnes Municipality) as a son of fisher-farmers. His mother died shortly after his birth, and his father became invalid in 1918. His father died in 1925, and Lydolf moved to Stranda Municipality where he worked at a furniture factory. He attended Fana Folk High School, Volda Teachers' College and the Norwegian College of Teaching in Trondheim from 1950 to 1951, and also took the examen artium in 1942.

In the 1930s he worked in Nordland and Finnmark; from 1937 to 1939 in Kautokeino and 1939 in Kirkenes, then Vadsø. Around the Petsamo–Kirkenes Offensive of 1944, Vadsø became uninhabitable until 1945. Meløy then returned and worked as a teacher in Vadsø until 1948, school inspector in Karasjok for twenty years and school director in Finnmark County Municipality from 1968 to 1978.

He was the mayor of Karasjok from 1956 to 1962. He represented the Liberal Party and was a deputy member of the Parliament of Norway from the constituency Finnmark during the term 1958–1961. He was present in 76 days of parliamentary session. He was a ballot candidate from the constituency Oslo in 1965. He chaired the trade union Norges Lærerlag from 1962 to 1968, having been a central board member since 1959. He became an honorary member in 1970 (when the organization had become Norsk Lærerlag). He was decorated with the King's Medal of Merit in gold in 1982.

He was the deputy chair of the Norwegian Broadcasting Corporation from 1968 to 1976. He was an active member of the temperance movement (IOGT), the Nynorsk movement and was a prominent and defender of Sami language and culture. In his later years he worked with writing, among others within teachers' history. In 1996 he published his memoirs Minne frå eit langt liv. He died in May 1999 in Sarpsborg.
