= Øksnes Church =

- Øksnes kirke
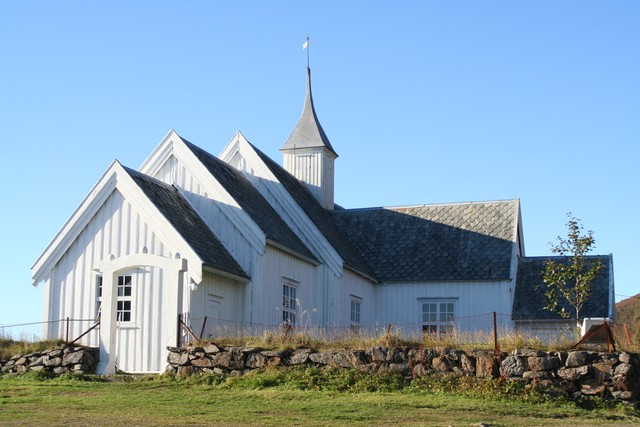
- View of the church
- Øksnes Church
- 68.87731146°N 14.9722905°E
- Location: Øksnes Municipality, Nordland
- Country: Norway
- Denomination: Church of Norway
- Churchmanship: Evangelical Lutheran

History
- Status: Parish church
- Founded: 13th century
- Consecrated: 1703

Architecture
- Functional status: Active
- Architectural type: Cruciform
- Completed: 1703 (323 years ago)

Specifications
- Capacity: 450
- Materials: Wood

Administration
- Diocese: Sør-Hålogaland
- Deanery: Vesterålen prosti
- Parish: Øksnes
- Norwegian Cultural Heritage Site
- Type: Church
- Status: Listed
- ID: 85901

Øksnes Church (Norwegian: Øksnes kirke) is a parish church of the Church of Norway in Øksnes Municipality in Nordland county, Norway. It is located on the southeastern tip of the island of Skogsøya. It is one of the churches for the Øksnes parish which is part of the Vesterålen prosti (deanery) in the Diocese of Sør-Hålogaland. The white, wooden church was built in a cruciform style in 1703 using plans drawn up by an unknown architect. The church seats about 450 people.

== History ==
The earliest existing historical records of the church date back to 1381, but it was not new that year. Not much is known about the medieval church or the buildings on the site over the centuries. The present church was possibly built in 1703. In 1716, it underwent some repair work and then again in 1754-1755 there was another renovation. By 1788, the church was in "fragile" condition so a massive renovation was planned. In 1794-1795, the church was totally renovated. The building was virtually rebuilt from the foundation up, reusing all of the materials that were still in good condition.

In 1814, this church served as an election church (Norwegian: valgkirke). Together with more than 300 other parish churches across Norway, it was a polling station for elections to the 1814 Norwegian Constituent Assembly which wrote the Constitution of Norway. This was Norway's first national elections. Each church parish was a constituency that elected people called "electors" who later met together in each county to elect the representatives for the assembly that was to meet at Eidsvoll Manor later that year.

In 1864, the roof of the church was taken off and rebuilt. It is quite possible that parts of the present-day church still include materials that were present in the church several hundred years ago.

=== Inventory ===
The altarpiece is a replica of a painting made by Gottfried Ezekiel (ca. 1719-1798) in 1759. The original is in the Bergen Museum. A native of Königsberg, Gottfried Ezekiel received a commission as a painter in Bergen during 1744. In 1751, he arrived in northern Norway, where he painted a number of church altarpieces.

== Media gallery ==
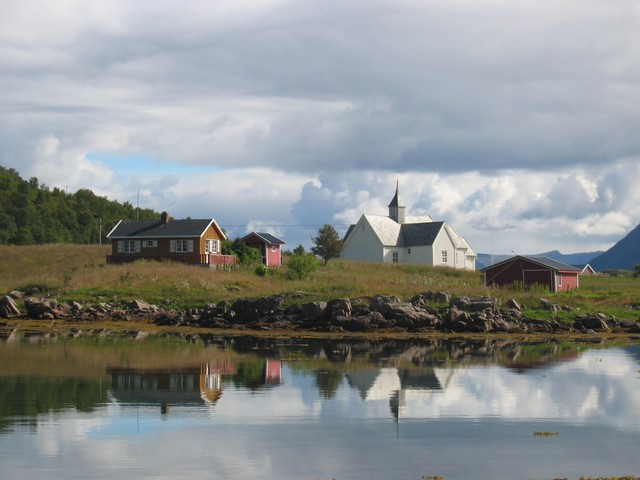

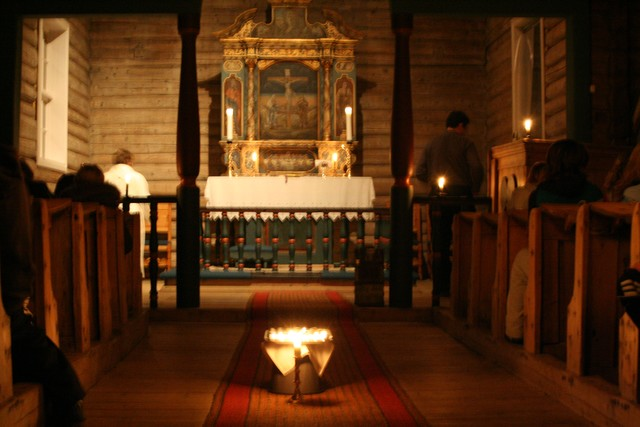

== See also ==
- List of churches in Sør-Hålogaland
