= Øksnes Municipality =

Municipality in Nordland, Norway

Øksnes Municipality Øksnes kommune
- Municipality
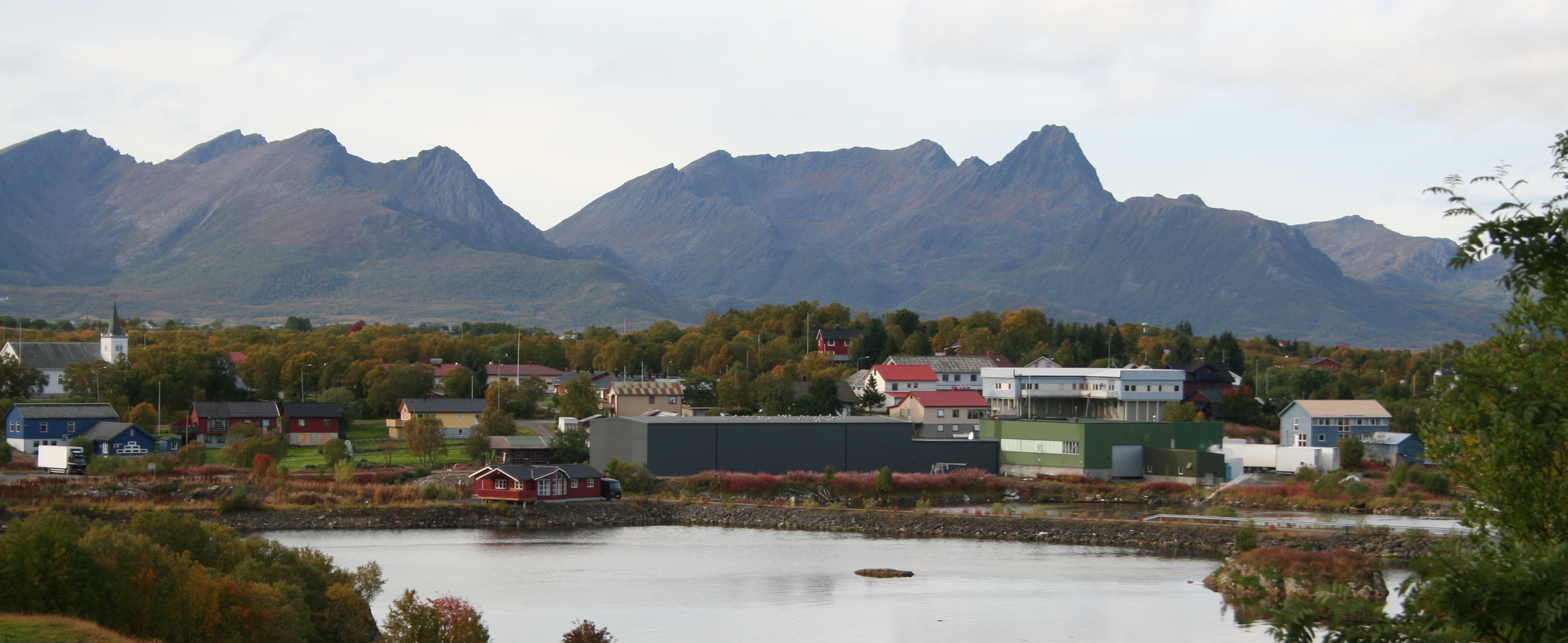
- View of Alsvåg in Øksnes

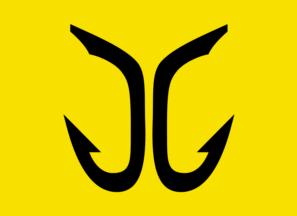
- Flag Coat of arms

- Nordland within Norway

- Øksnes within Nordland
- Coordinates: 68°53′18″N 15°11′00″E
- Country: Norway
- County: Nordland
- District: Vesterålen
- Established: 1 Jan 1838
  - Created as: Formannskapsdistrikt
- Administrative centre: Myre

Government
  - Mayor (2023): Elisabeth Sørdahl (H)

Area
  - Total: 319.60 km^{2} (123.40 sq mi)
  - Land: 310.73 km^{2} (119.97 sq mi)
  - Water: 8.87 km^{2} (3.42 sq mi) 2.8%
  - Rank: #257 in Norway
- Highest elevation: 762.46 m (2,501.5 ft)

Population (2024)
  - Total: 4,569
  - Rank: #190 in Norway
  - Density: 14.3/km^{2} (37/sq mi)
  - Change (10 years): ▲ +0.2%
- Demonym: Øksnesværing

Official language
  - Norwegian form: Neutral
- Time zone: UTC+01:00 (CET)
  - Summer (DST): UTC+02:00 (CEST)
- ISO 3166 code: NO-1868
- Website: Official website

Øksnes is a municipality in Nordland county, Norway. It is located on the northwestern part of the large island of Langøya, which is a part of the traditional region of Vesterålen. The administrative centre of the municipality is the village of Myre. Other villages in Øksnes include Alsvåg, Barkestad, Breidstrand, Nyksund, Strengelvåg, and Stø.

The 320-square-kilometre (120 sq mi) municipality is the 257th largest by area out of the 357 municipalities in Norway. Øksnes Municipality is the 190th most populous municipality in Norway with a population of 4,569. The municipality's population density is 14.3 inhabitants per square kilometre (37/sq mi) and its population has increased by 0.2% over the previous 10-year period.

== General information ==
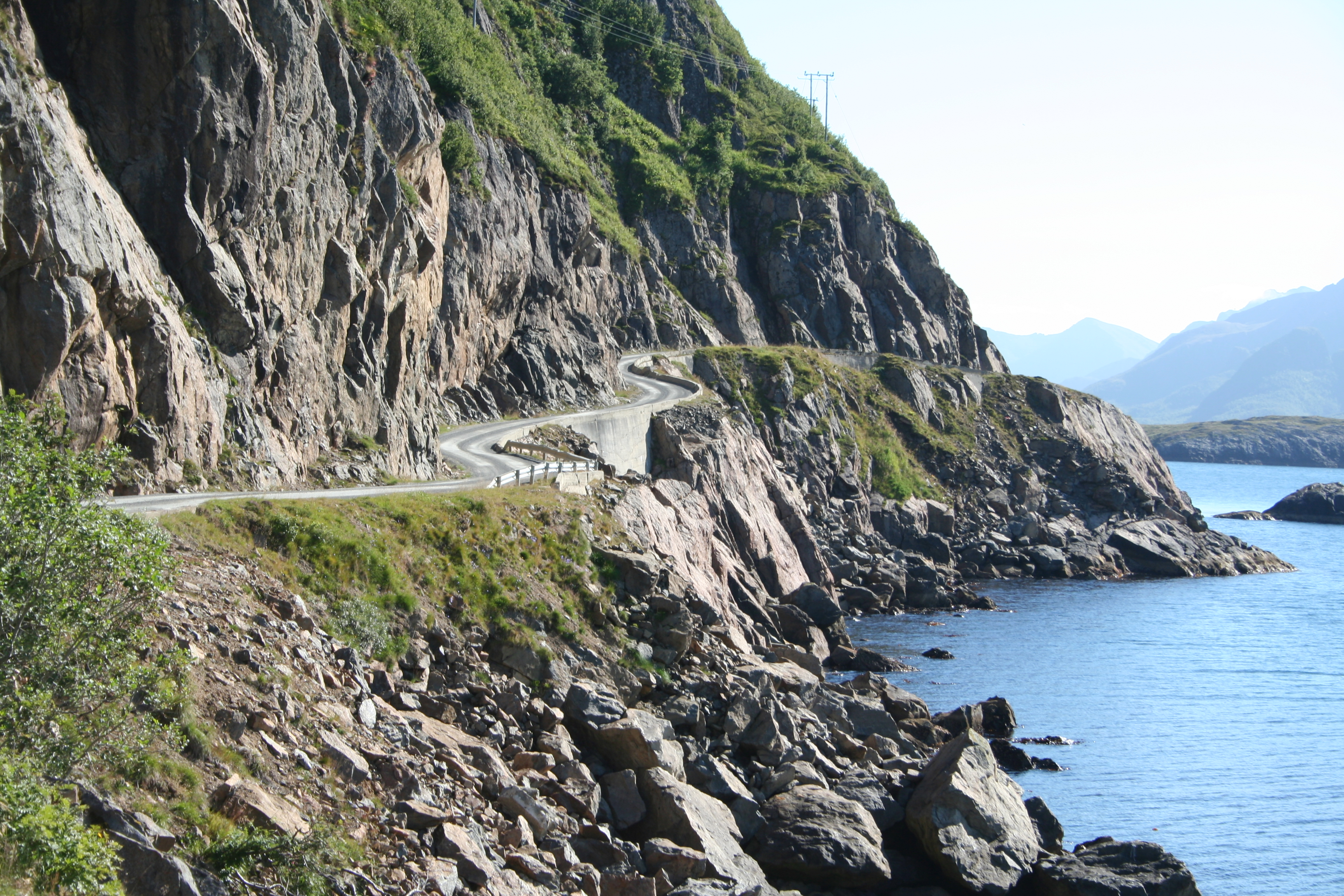
Part of the road to Nyksund.

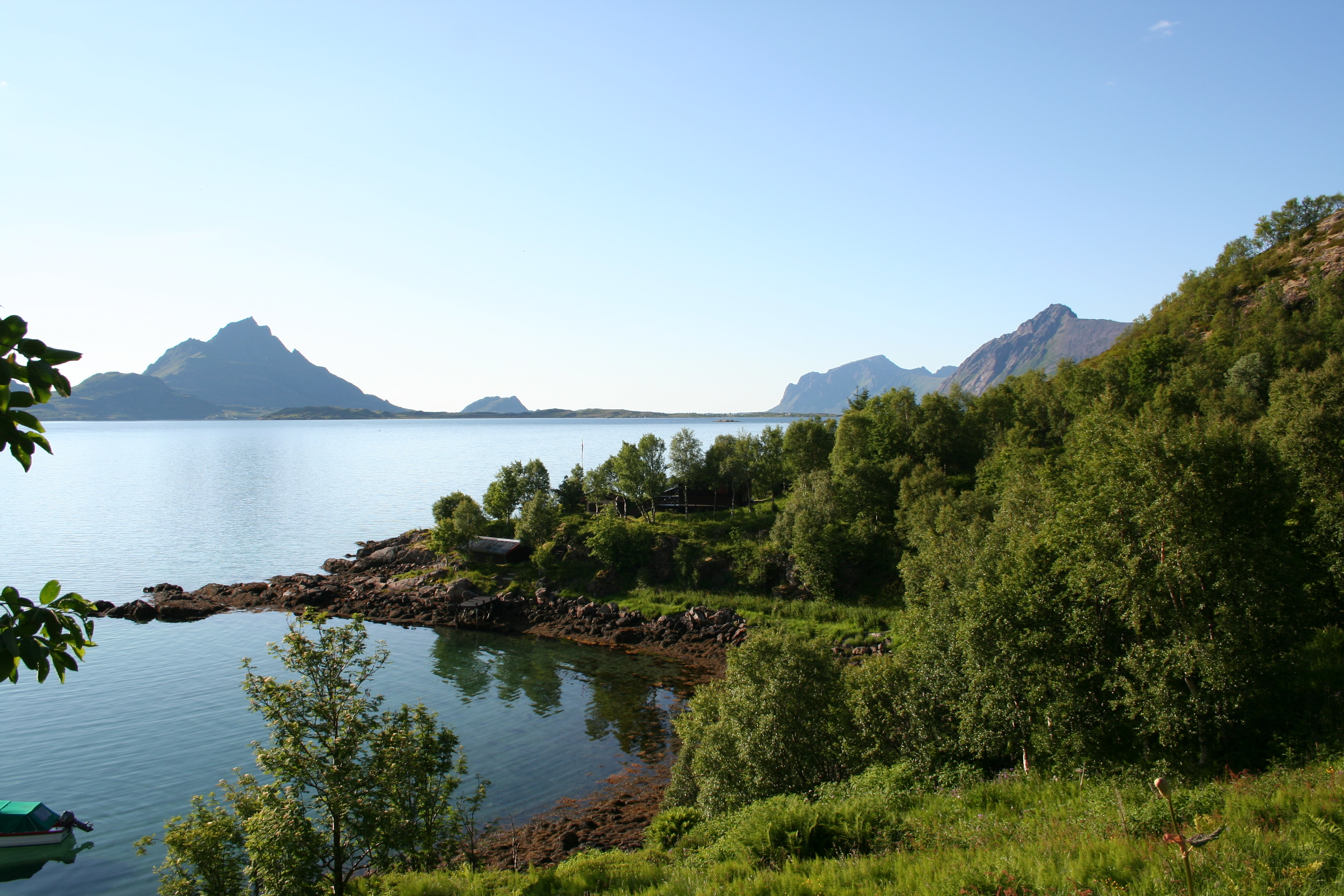
Auenfjorden, Øksnes

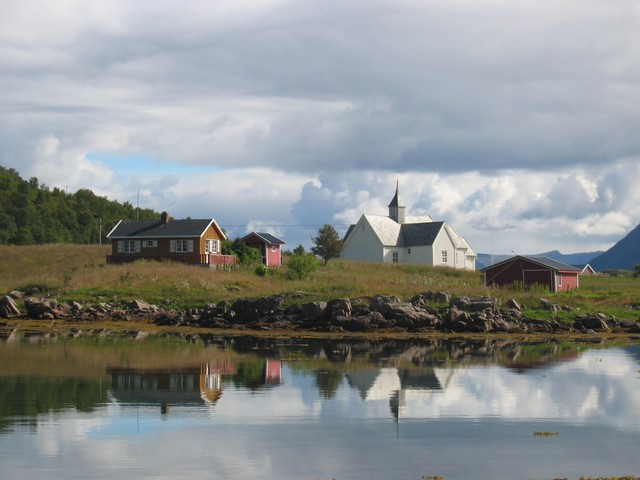
View of Øksnes Church on Skogsøya island

The municipality of Øksnes was established on 1 January 1838 (see formannskapsdistrikt law). On 1 January 1866, a small area of southern Øksnes (population: 40) was transferred to the neighboring Bø Municipality. On 1 July 1919, the northeastern part of Øksnes along the Gavlfjorden (population: 1,085) was separated to form the new Langenes Municipality. This left Øksnes with 2,296 residents.

During the 1960s, there were many municipal mergers across Norway due to the work of the Schei Committee. On 1 January 1964, the Krakberget area and the part of Øksnes on the peninsula north of Krakberget (population: 271) was transferred to the neighboring Bø Municipality. On the same date Langenes Municipality was merged with Øksnes. Prior to the merger, Øksnes had 3,112 residents and Langenes had 2,037 residents.

=== Name ===
The municipality (originally the parish) is named after the old Øksnes farm (Old Norse: Yxnes) since the first Øksnes Church was built there. The first element is probably an old name of Skogsøya island (Old Norse: Yxn). The old name of the island was identical with the word yxn which means "oxen". The mountains of the island have maybe been compared with a group of oxen. The last element is nes which means "headland".

=== Coat of arms ===
The coat of arms was granted on 22 August 1986. The official blazon is "Or two hooks addorsed sable" (Norwegian: I gull to adosserte svarte angler). This means the arms have a field (background) that has a tincture of Or which means it is commonly colored yellow, but if it is made out of metal, then gold is used. The charge is two black fishing hooks. The design was chosen to symbolize a municipality which is dependent on fishing and sailing. The hooks were based on the bone hooks that were used for fishing in this area prior to 17th century. The arms were designed by Arvid Sveen.

=== Churches ===
The Church of Norway has one parish (sokn) within Øksnes Municipality. It is part of the Vesterålen prosti (deanery) in the Diocese of Sør-Hålogaland.

Churches in Øksnes Municipality
Parish (sokn)	Church Name	Location of the Church	Year built
Øksnes	Alsvåg Church	Alsvåg	1923
Øksnes	Langenes Church	Stø	1500s
Øksnes	Myre Church	Myre	1979
Øksnes	Øksnes Church	Skogsøya	1703

== Environment ==
=== Geography ===
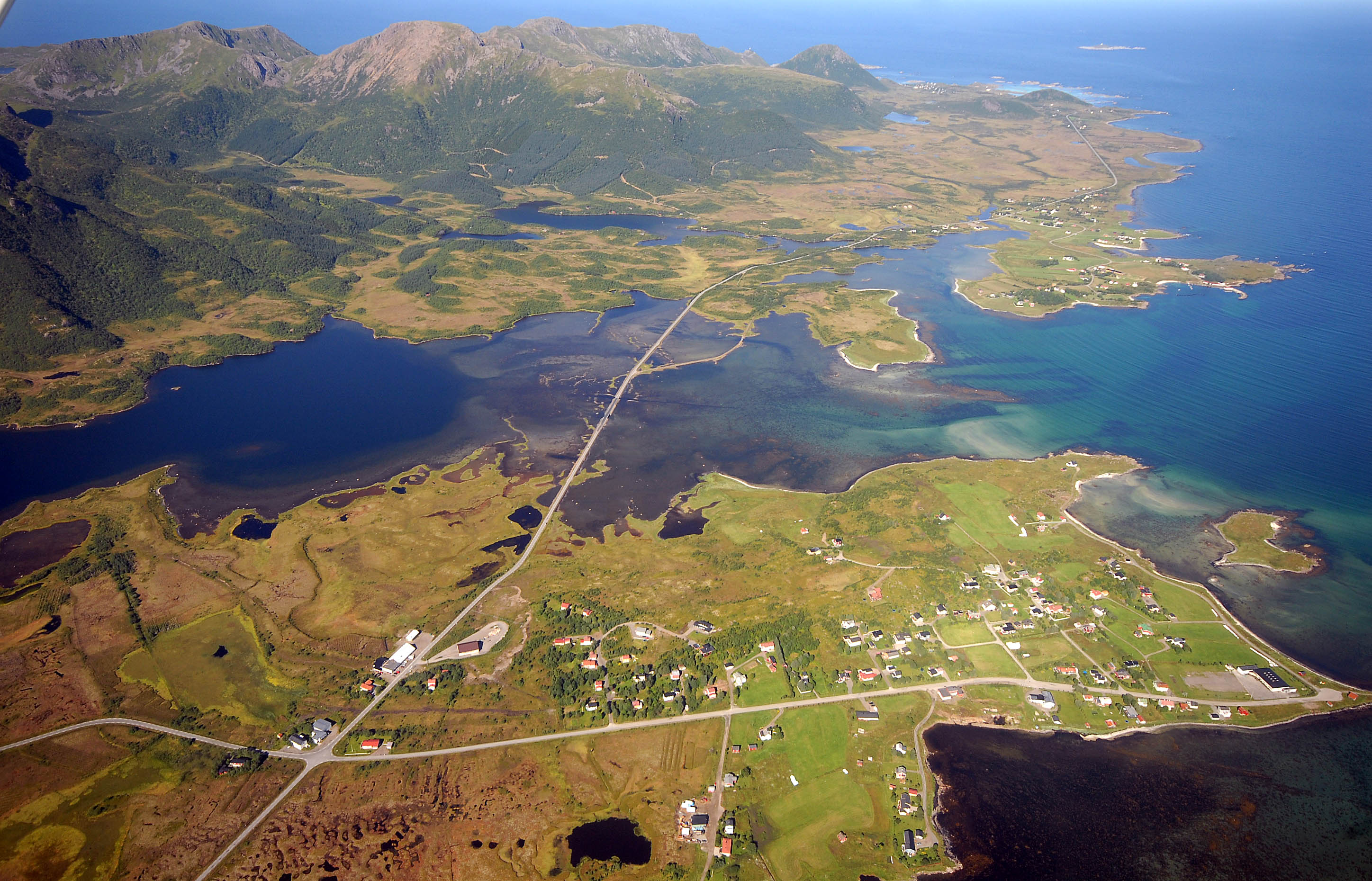
View of Strengelvag

Øksnes municipality encompasses the northwestern part of the island of Langøya in the Vesterålen archipelago. It also includes many small islands around there including the islands of Anden, Dyrøya, Nærøya, Skogsøya, and Tindsøya. The Gavlfjorden flows along the northeastern part of the boundary with Andøy Municipality on the other side. The southeastern part of Øksnes borders Sortland Municipality and the southwestern part borders Bø Municipality (both municipalities are also located on Langøya island). The rest of the municipality borders the Norwegian Sea.

The municipality is quite rugged with the exception of the area east of Myre which is very flat and marshy. The large lake Alsvågvatnet lies near this flat area, just east of the village of Alsvåg. This flat area lies just to the north of the 762.46-metre (2,501.5 ft) tall mountain Snøkolla, which is the highest point in the municipality. The Anda Lighthouse is located on the tiny island of Anden.

=== Important Bird Area ===
An area of about 6,000 hectares (15,000 acres) at the north-eastern end of the island, comprising coastal lagoons, fens, transition mires, springs and mudflats, including the Grunnfjorden nature reserve and Grunnfjorden Ramsar site as well as other wetlands, has been designated an Important Bird Area (IBA) by BirdLife International (BLI) because it supports populations of pink-footed and barnacle geese on passage migration.

=== Climate ===
Climate data for Myre, Øksnes
Month	Jan	Feb	Mar	Apr	May	Jun	Jul	Aug	Sep	Oct	Nov	Dec	Year
Daily mean °C (°F)	−2.0 (28.4)	−2.0 (28.4)	−1.0 (30.2)	1.5 (34.7)	5.8 (42.4)	9.1 (48.4)	11.6 (52.9)	11.5 (52.7)	8.1 (46.6)	4.5 (40.1)	1.2 (34.2)	−1.0 (30.2)	3.9 (39.0)
Average precipitation mm (inches)	130 (5.1)	121 (4.8)	105 (4.1)	91 (3.6)	64 (2.5)	69 (2.7)	82 (3.2)	86 (3.4)	141 (5.6)	195 (7.7)	146 (5.7)	150 (5.9)	1,380 (54.3)
Source: Norwegian Meteorological Institute

== Government ==
Øksnes Municipality is responsible for primary education (through 10th grade), outpatient health services, senior citizen services, welfare and other social services, zoning, economic development, and municipal roads and utilities. The municipality is governed by a municipal council of directly elected representatives. The mayor is indirectly elected by a vote of the municipal council. The municipality is under the jurisdiction of the Midtre Hålogaland District Court and the Hålogaland Court of Appeal.

=== Municipal council ===
The municipal council (Kommunestyre) of Øksnes Municipality is made up of 21 representatives that are elected to four year terms. The tables below show the current and historical composition of the council by political party.

Øksnes kommunestyre 2023–2027
Party name (in Norwegian)	Number of representatives
Labour Party (Arbeiderpartiet)	4
Progress Party (Fremskrittspartiet)	3
Conservative Party (Høyre)	6
Centre Party (Senterpartiet)	5
Socialist Left Party (Sosialistisk Venstreparti)	3
Total number of members:	21

Øksnes kommunestyre 2019–2023
Party name (in Norwegian)	Number of representatives
Labour Party (Arbeiderpartiet)	5
Progress Party (Fremskrittspartiet)	2
Conservative Party (Høyre)	2
Centre Party (Senterpartiet)	8
Socialist Left Party (Sosialistisk Venstreparti)	2
Liberal Party (Venstre)	2
Total number of members:	21

Øksnes kommunestyre 2015–2019
Party name (in Norwegian)	Number of representatives
Labour Party (Arbeiderpartiet)	6
Progress Party (Fremskrittspartiet)	2
Conservative Party (Høyre)	2
Christian Democratic Party (Kristelig Folkeparti)	1
Centre Party (Senterpartiet)	4
Socialist Left Party (Sosialistisk Venstreparti)	2
Øksnes cross-party list (Øksnes tverrpolitiske liste)	4
Total number of members:	21

Øksnes kommunestyre 2011–2015
Party name (in Norwegian)	Number of representatives
Labour Party (Arbeiderpartiet)	7
Progress Party (Fremskrittspartiet)	2
Conservative Party (Høyre)	3
Christian Democratic Party (Kristelig Folkeparti)	2
Centre Party (Senterpartiet)	1
Socialist Left Party (Sosialistisk Venstreparti)	1
Øksnes cross-party list (Øksnes tverrpolitiske liste)	5
Total number of members:	21

Øksnes kommunestyre 2007–2011
Party name (in Norwegian)	Number of representatives
Labour Party (Arbeiderpartiet)	5
Progress Party (Fremskrittspartiet)	4
Conservative Party (Høyre)	1
Christian Democratic Party (Kristelig Folkeparti)	2
Centre Party (Senterpartiet)	2
Øksnes cross-party list (Øksnes tverrpolitiske liste)	7
Total number of members:	21

Øksnes kommunestyre 2003–2007
Party name (in Norwegian)	Number of representatives
Labour Party (Arbeiderpartiet)	3
Progress Party (Fremskrittspartiet)	4
Conservative Party (Høyre)	3
Christian Democratic Party (Kristelig Folkeparti)	1
Centre Party (Senterpartiet)	4
Socialist Left Party (Sosialistisk Venstreparti)	2
Øksnes cross-party list (Øksnes Tverrpolitiske liste)	4
Total number of members:	21

Øksnes kommunestyre 1999–2003
Party name (in Norwegian)	Number of representatives
Labour Party (Arbeiderpartiet)	11
Conservative Party (Høyre)	8
Christian Democratic Party (Kristelig Folkeparti)	3
Centre Party (Senterpartiet)	5
Socialist Left Party (Sosialistisk Venstreparti)	3
Liberal Party (Venstre)	1
Total number of members:	31

Øksnes kommunestyre 1995–1999
Party name (in Norwegian)	Number of representatives
Labour Party (Arbeiderpartiet)	9
Conservative Party (Høyre)	6
Christian Democratic Party (Kristelig Folkeparti)	4
Pensioners' Party (Pensjonistpartiet)	1
Centre Party (Senterpartiet)	7
Socialist Left Party (Sosialistisk Venstreparti)	4
Total number of members:	31

Øksnes kommunestyre 1991–1995
Party name (in Norwegian)	Number of representatives
Labour Party (Arbeiderpartiet)	9
Progress Party (Fremskrittspartiet)	2
Conservative Party (Høyre)	6
Christian Democratic Party (Kristelig Folkeparti)	3
Pensioners' Party (Pensjonistpartiet)	2
Centre Party (Senterpartiet)	4
Socialist Left Party (Sosialistisk Venstreparti)	5
Total number of members:	31

Øksnes kommunestyre 1987–1991
Party name (in Norwegian)	Number of representatives
Labour Party (Arbeiderpartiet)	10
Progress Party (Fremskrittspartiet)	3
Conservative Party (Høyre)	8
Christian Democratic Party (Kristelig Folkeparti)	4
Centre Party (Senterpartiet)	2
Socialist Left Party (Sosialistisk Venstreparti)	3
Liberal Party (Venstre)	1
Total number of members:	31

Øksnes kommunestyre 1983–1987
Party name (in Norwegian)	Number of representatives
Labour Party (Arbeiderpartiet)	11
Conservative Party (Høyre)	9
Christian Democratic Party (Kristelig Folkeparti)	4
Centre Party (Senterpartiet)	2
Socialist Left Party (Sosialistisk Venstreparti)	3
Liberal Party (Venstre)	1
Free Voters (Frie Velgere)	1
Total number of members:	31

Øksnes kommunestyre 1979–1983
Party name (in Norwegian)	Number of representatives
Labour Party (Arbeiderpartiet)	8
Conservative Party (Høyre)	8
Christian Democratic Party (Kristelig Folkeparti)	5
Centre Party (Senterpartiet)	3
Socialist Left Party (Sosialistisk Venstreparti)	2
Liberal Party (Venstre)	1
Øksnes Free Voters' List (Øksnes Frie Velgeres Liste)	2
Øksnes West and Midtbygd's common list (Øksnes Vest- og Midtbygds fellesliste)	2
Total number of members:	31

Øksnes kommunestyre 1975–1979
Party name (in Norwegian)	Number of representatives
Labour Party (Arbeiderpartiet)	10
Conservative Party (Høyre)	5
Christian Democratic Party (Kristelig Folkeparti)	6
Centre Party (Senterpartiet)	4
Socialist Left Party (Sosialistisk Venstreparti)	1
Liberal Party (Venstre)	1
Øksnes Free Voters' List (Øksnes Frie Velgeres Liste)	4
Total number of members:	31

Øksnes kommunestyre 1971–1975
Party name (in Norwegian)	Number of representatives
Labour Party (Arbeiderpartiet)	13
Conservative Party (Høyre)	3
Christian Democratic Party (Kristelig Folkeparti)	4
Centre Party (Senterpartiet)	3
Liberal Party (Venstre)	2
Local List(s) (Lokale lister)	6
Total number of members:	31

Øksnes kommunestyre 1967–1971
Party name (in Norwegian)	Number of representatives
Labour Party (Arbeiderpartiet)	15
Conservative Party (Høyre)	5
Christian Democratic Party (Kristelig Folkeparti)	4
Centre Party (Senterpartiet)	1
Socialist People's Party (Sosialistisk Folkeparti)	3
Liberal Party (Venstre)	3
Total number of members:	31

Øksnes kommunestyre 1963–1967
Party name (in Norwegian)	Number of representatives
Labour Party (Arbeiderpartiet)	14
Conservative Party (Høyre)	4
Christian Democratic Party (Kristelig Folkeparti)	5
Socialist People's Party (Sosialistisk Folkeparti)	1
Local List(s) (Lokale lister)	7
Total number of members:	31
Note: On 1 January 1963, Langenes Municipality became part of Øksnes Municipality.

Øksnes herredsstyre 1959–1963
Party name (in Norwegian)	Number of representatives
Labour Party (Arbeiderpartiet)	5
Local List(s) (Lokale lister)	16
Total number of members:	21

Øksnes herredsstyre 1955–1959
Party name (in Norwegian)	Number of representatives
Local List(s) (Lokale lister)	21
Total number of members:	21

Øksnes herredsstyre 1951–1955
Party name (in Norwegian)	Number of representatives
Labour Party (Arbeiderpartiet)	8
Joint List(s) of Non-Socialist Parties (Borgerlige Felleslister)	8
Total number of members:	16

Øksnes herredsstyre 1947–1951
Party name (in Norwegian)	Number of representatives
Labour Party (Arbeiderpartiet)	7
Joint List(s) of Non-Socialist Parties (Borgerlige Felleslister)	9
Total number of members:	16

Øksnes herredsstyre 1945–1947
Party name (in Norwegian)	Number of representatives
Labour Party (Arbeiderpartiet)	11
Local List(s) (Lokale lister)	5
Total number of members:	16

Øksnes herredsstyre 1937–1941*
Party name (in Norwegian)	Number of representatives
Local List(s) (Lokale lister)	16
Total number of members:	16
Note: Due to the German occupation of Norway during World War II, no elections were held for new municipal councils until after the war ended in 1945.

=== Mayors ===
The mayor (Norwegian: ordfører) of Øksnes Municipality is the political leader of the municipality and the chairperson of the municipal council. Here is a list of people who have held this position:

- 1838–1846: Peter Andreas Berg
- 1847–1848: Johan Arnt Hoem
- 1849–1851: Unknown
- 1852–1856: Per Christophersen
- 1857–1858: Knut Celius
- 1859–1871: Ludvik Wiese
- 1871–1879: Halvor Rasmussen
- 1879–1882: Morten Stephansen
- 1883–1893: Kolbein Sjursen Haaheim
- 1894–1896: Carl Emil Nielsen
- 1897–1901: Richard Anton Hansen
- 1901–1904: Andreas Bernhard Nielsen
- 1905–1923: Gregus Bjørnstad (V)
- 1923–1931: Karl Renø
- 1931–1937: S.B. Berntsen (H)
- 1937–1941: Hildor Johan Øynes (Ap)
- 1941–1944: S.B. Berntsen (H)
- 1945–1945: Torstein Olsen
- 1945–1947: Reidar Hansen
- 1947–1963: Olaf Jakobsen (V)
- 1964–1967: Otto Herman Holm (Ap)
- 1967–1973: Finn Knutsen (Ap)
- 1973–1979: Arvid Falch (H)
- 1979–1991: Finn Steen (H)
- 1991–1999: Finn Knutsen (Ap)
- 1999–2003: Geir Hugo Rognan (Ap)
- 2003–2007: Per-Ole Larsen (Sp)
- 2007–2011: John H. Danielsen (Ap)
- 2011–2015: Jørn Martinussen (H)
- 2015–2019: Karianne Bråthen (Ap)
- 2019–2023: John H. Danielsen (Sp)
- 2023–present: Elisabeth Sørdahl (H)

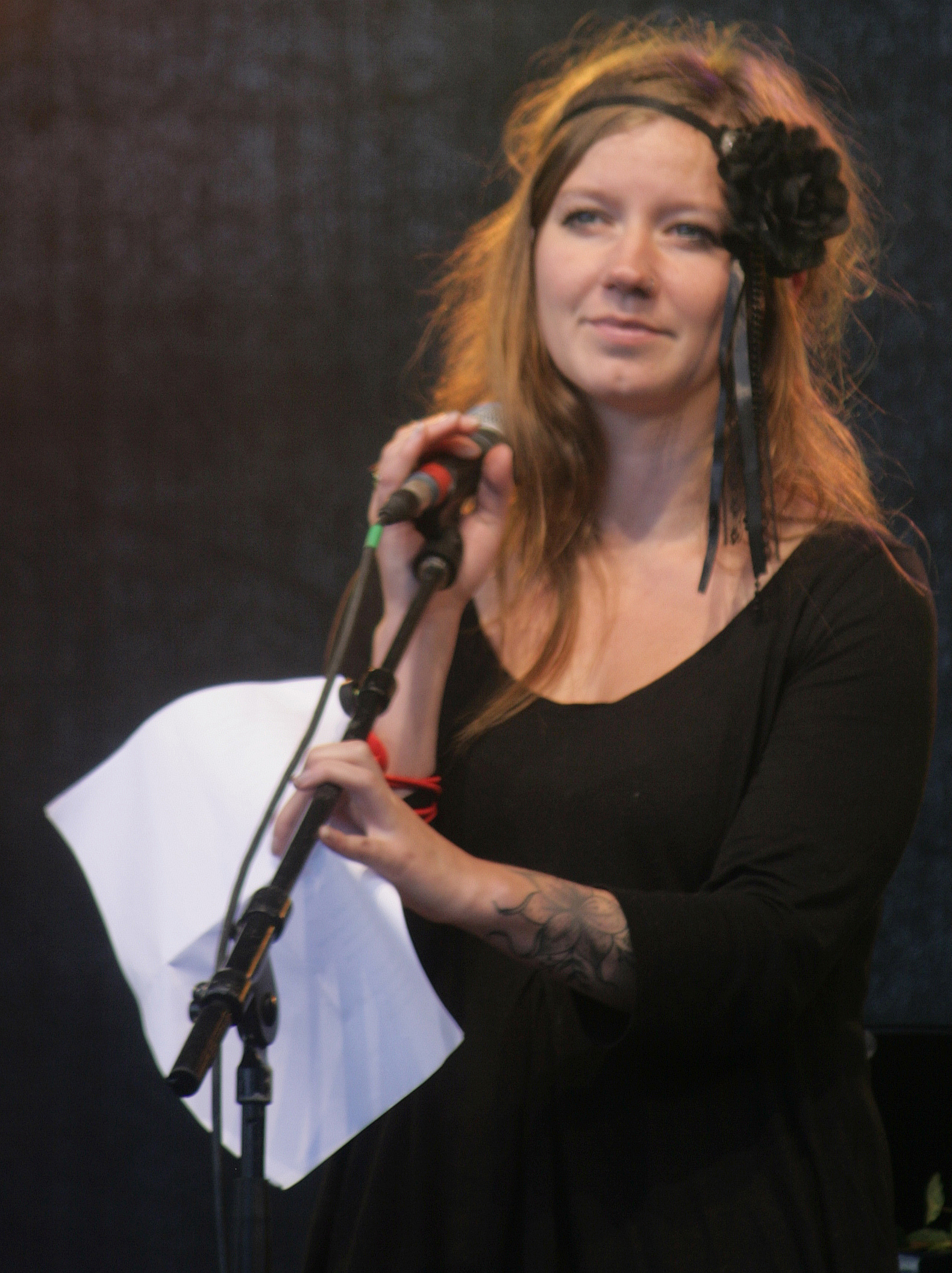
Maria Solheim 2011

== Notable people ==
- Oskar J. W. Hansen (1892 in Langenes – 1971), a naturalized American sculptor who worked at the Hoover Dam
- Lydolf Lind Meløy (1908 in Meløya – 1999), an educator, trade unionist, and politician
- Finn Knutsen (born 1932 in Langenes), a Norwegian politician and mayor of Øksnes
- Ove Kristian Sundberg (1932 in Øksnes – 2019), a church musician, musicologist, and historian of ideas
- Maria Solheim (born 1982 in Alsvåg), a singer-songwriter
