= Myre, Øksnes =

Village in Øksnes Municipality, Norway

Myre
- Village
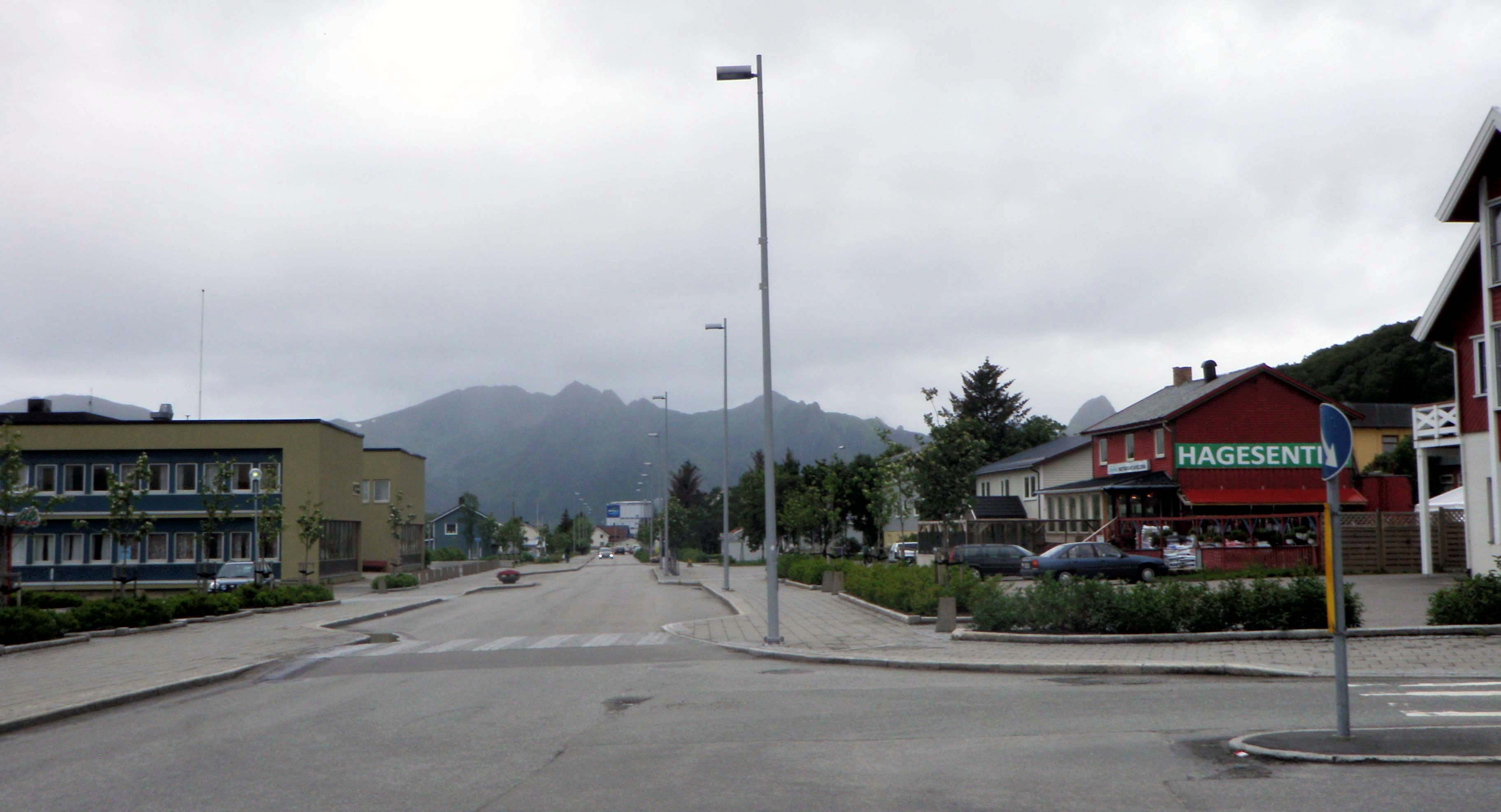
- Myre's main street
- Interactive map of Myre
- Location within Nordland Location within Norway
- Coordinates: 68.9140°N 15.0784°E
- Country: Norway
- Region: Northern Norway
- County: Nordland
- District: Vesterålen
- Municipality: Øksnes Municipality

Area
  - Total: 1.81 km^{2} (0.70 sq mi)
- Elevation: 11 m (36 ft)

Population (2023)
  - Total: 2,211
  - Density: 1,222/km^{2} (3,160/sq mi)
- Time zone: UTC+01:00 (CET)
  - Summer (DST): UTC+02:00 (CEST)
- Post Code: 8430 Myre

Myre is the administrative centre of Øksnes Municipality in Nordland county, Norway. It is located on the northwestern part of the island of Langøya in the Vesterålen archipelago. Myre is one of the largest fishing villages in the Vesterålen region. Myre Church is located in this village.

The 1.81-square-kilometre (450-acre) village has a population (2023) of 2,211 and a population density of 1,222 inhabitants per square kilometre (3,160/sq mi).

The newspaper Øksnesavisa is published in Myre.

== Etymology ==
The village's name stems from the Old Norse word mýrr, and is linked to the extensive amount of mires nearby.

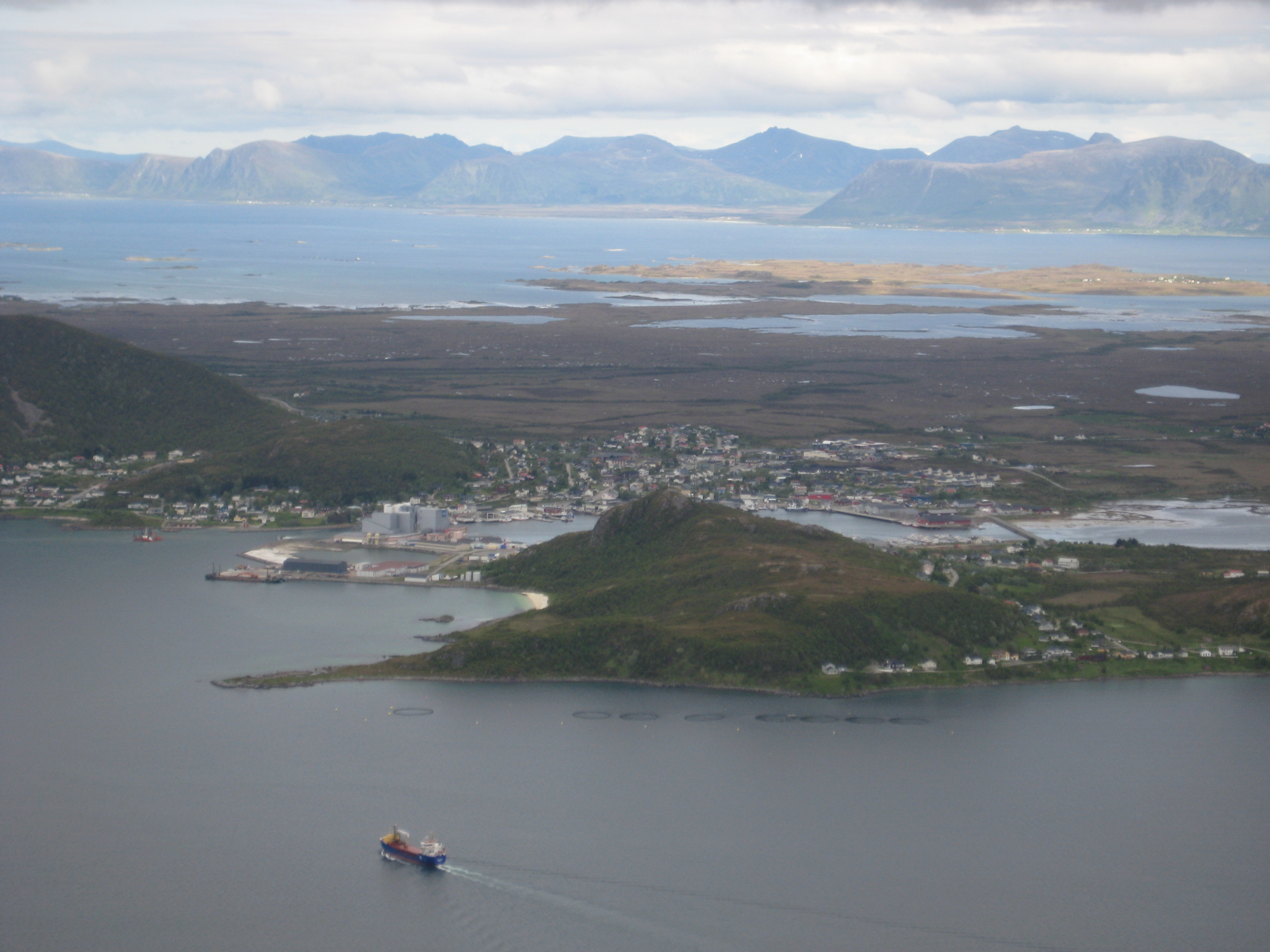
Part of Myre seen from Øksnesheia
