= Langøya =

Island in Nordland, Norway

Langøya Langøy
- Interactive map of Langøya; Langøy

Geography
- Location: Nordland, Norway
- Coordinates: 68.6220°N 14.9407°E
- Archipelago: Vesterålen
- Area: 850.2 km^{2} (328.3 sq mi)
- Area rank: 3rd largest in Norway
- Length: 50 km (31 mi)
- Width: 40 km (25 mi)
- Highest elevation: 763 m (2503 ft)
- Highest point: Snøkolla

Administration
- Norway
- County: Nordland
- Municipalities: Bø, Hadsel, Sortland, and Øksnes

Demographics
- Population: 15,791 (2016)
- Pop. density: 18.6/km^{2} (48.2/sq mi)

Langøya is the third largest island of Norway (outside of Svalbard), with an area of 850.2 square kilometres (328.3 sq mi). The island is a part of the Vesterålen archipelago in Nordland county, Norway. The island includes Bø Municipality and Øksnes Municipality as well as parts of Sortland Municipality and Hadsel Municipality.

== Geography ==
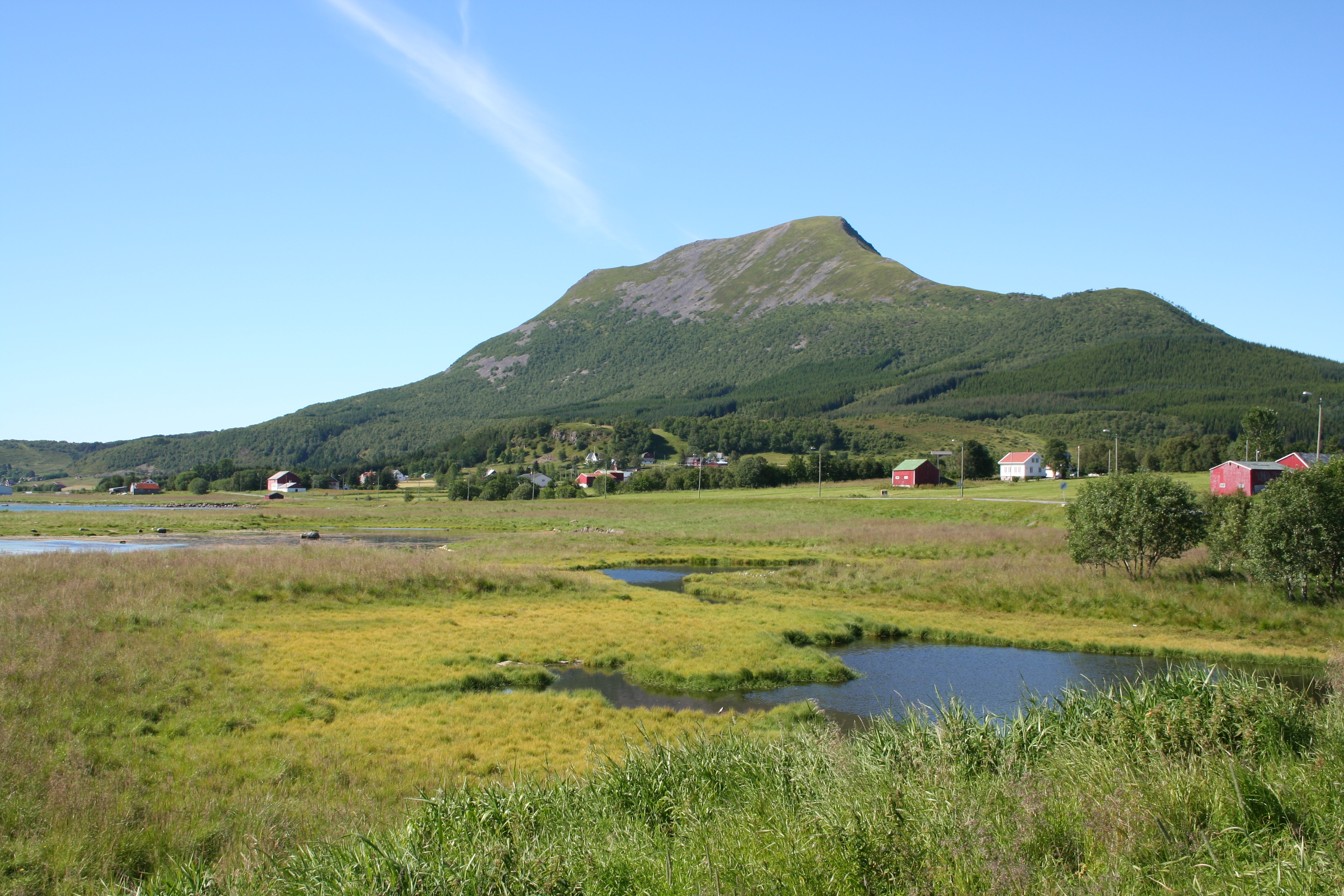
View towards Hallartinden, 530 m ASL, southern Langøya

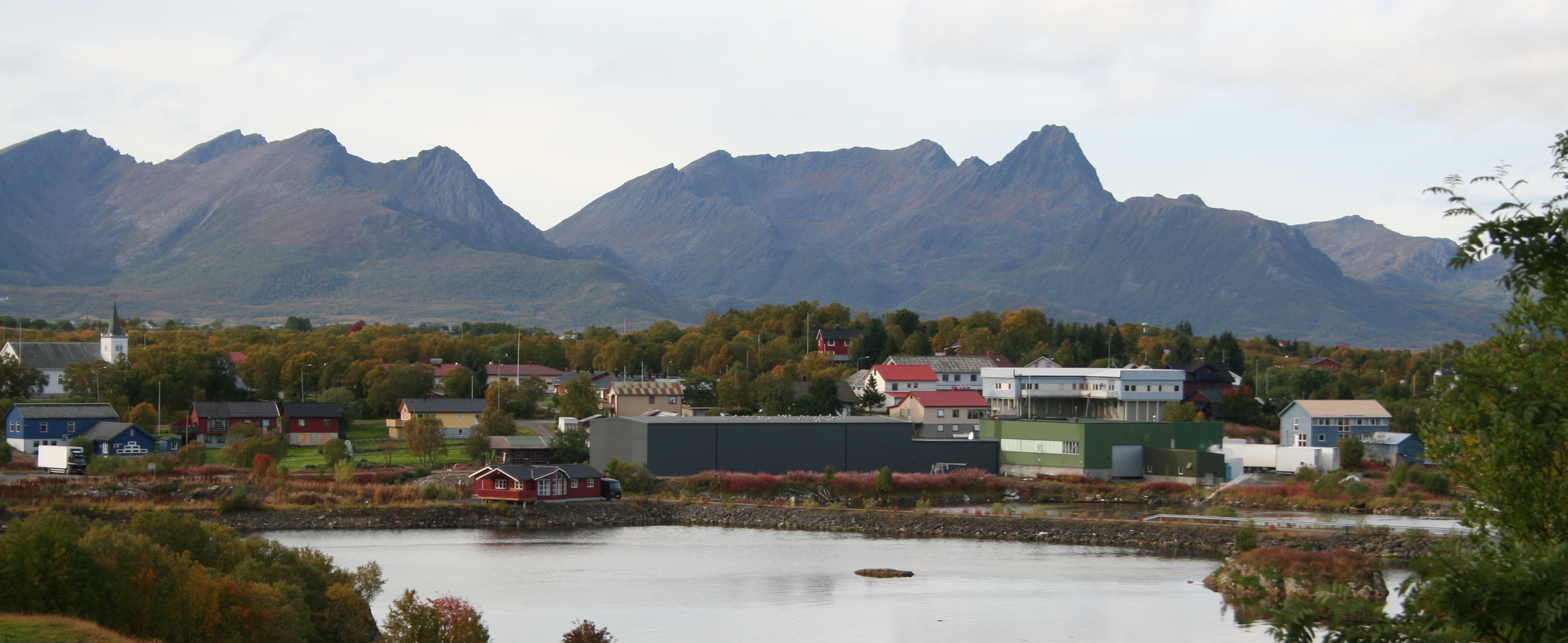
Alsvåg in Øksnes Municipality

Langøya is mountainous, with mountains reaching 400–700 metres (1,300–2,300 ft) above sea level, the highest is the 763-metre (2,503 ft) tall Snykolla. There are also lowland near the coasts around the island, and in some valleys, some of it is bogs. The treeline is around 300 metres (980 ft) above sea level on Langøya.

The total population on the island is about 15,600 and the largest population center is the town of Sortland (population: 5,600) and the next largest population centre is the village of Myre. Langøya has been settled since the stone age.

The larger island Hinnøya lies to the east (on the other side of the Sortlandssundet). The island of Andøya lies to the northeast. The small island of Skogsøya lies to the northwest. The island of Hadseløya lies to the south. The 69th parallel north crosses Langøya, as does the 15th meridian east.

There are several lakes on the island including Alsvågvatnet. The Eidsfjorden divides the island almost in half. The island has two road bridges connecting it to Hadseløya and Hinnøya via the Hadsel Bridge and Sortland Bridge.

== Important Bird Area ==
A tract of about 3,000 hectares (7,400 acres) of low-lying land in central and south-eastern coastal Langøya, consisting mainly of grassland and mudflats, and including the Vikosen nature reserve, has been designated an Important Bird Area (IBA) by BirdLife International (BLI) because it supports populations of several thousand pink-footed and barnacle geese on passage migration.

== Climate ==
Langøya has a subpolar oceanic climate (Cfc), with very mild winter for the location north of the Arctic Circle. The warmest temperature recorded on the island by an official weather station is 31 °C (88 °F) at Kleiva in Sortland municipality in July 2018. The weather station near Stokmarknes Airport, Skagen is located on the southern part of the island and has recorded temperature since June 1972. Data for extremes available since 2004, there might be warmer or colder temperatures recorded before 2004.

Climate data for Stokmarknes Airport Skagen 1991-2020 (3 m, precipitation 1961-90, extremes 2004-2020)
Month	Jan	Feb	Mar	Apr	May	Jun	Jul	Aug	Sep	Oct	Nov	Dec	Year
Record high °C (°F)	10 (50)	8.4 (47.1)	9.4 (48.9)	17.3 (63.1)	26.4 (79.5)	27.5 (81.5)	29 (84)	27.2 (81.0)	22.2 (72.0)	16.9 (62.4)	12.3 (54.1)	10.3 (50.5)	29 (84)
Mean daily maximum °C (°F)	1 (34)	1 (34)	2 (36)	6 (43)	10 (50)	13 (55)	16 (61)	15 (59)	12 (54)	7 (45)	4 (39)	3 (37)	8 (46)
Daily mean °C (°F)	−0.1 (31.8)	−0.7 (30.7)	−0.1 (31.8)	2.5 (36.5)	6.4 (43.5)	9.7 (49.5)	12.8 (55.0)	12.2 (54.0)	9.2 (48.6)	4.9 (40.8)	2.7 (36.9)	0.9 (33.6)	5.0 (41.1)
Mean daily minimum °C (°F)	−2 (28)	−2 (28)	−3 (27)	0 (32)	4 (39)	7 (45)	10 (50)	9 (48)	7 (45)	3 (37)	1 (34)	−1 (30)	3 (37)
Record low °C (°F)	−13.9 (7.0)	−13.9 (7.0)	−14.4 (6.1)	−10.5 (13.1)	−5.6 (21.9)	−0.1 (31.8)	3.2 (37.8)	1.2 (34.2)	−2.9 (26.8)	−7.6 (18.3)	−13 (9)	−11.1 (12.0)	−14.4 (6.1)
Average precipitation mm (inches)	110 (4.3)	95 (3.7)	83 (3.3)	69 (2.7)	49 (1.9)	50 (2.0)	65 (2.6)	68 (2.7)	107 (4.2)	155 (6.1)	123 (4.8)	126 (5.0)	1,100 (43.3)
Source 1: Norwegian Meteorological Institute
Source 2: weatheronline climate robot

== Media gallery ==
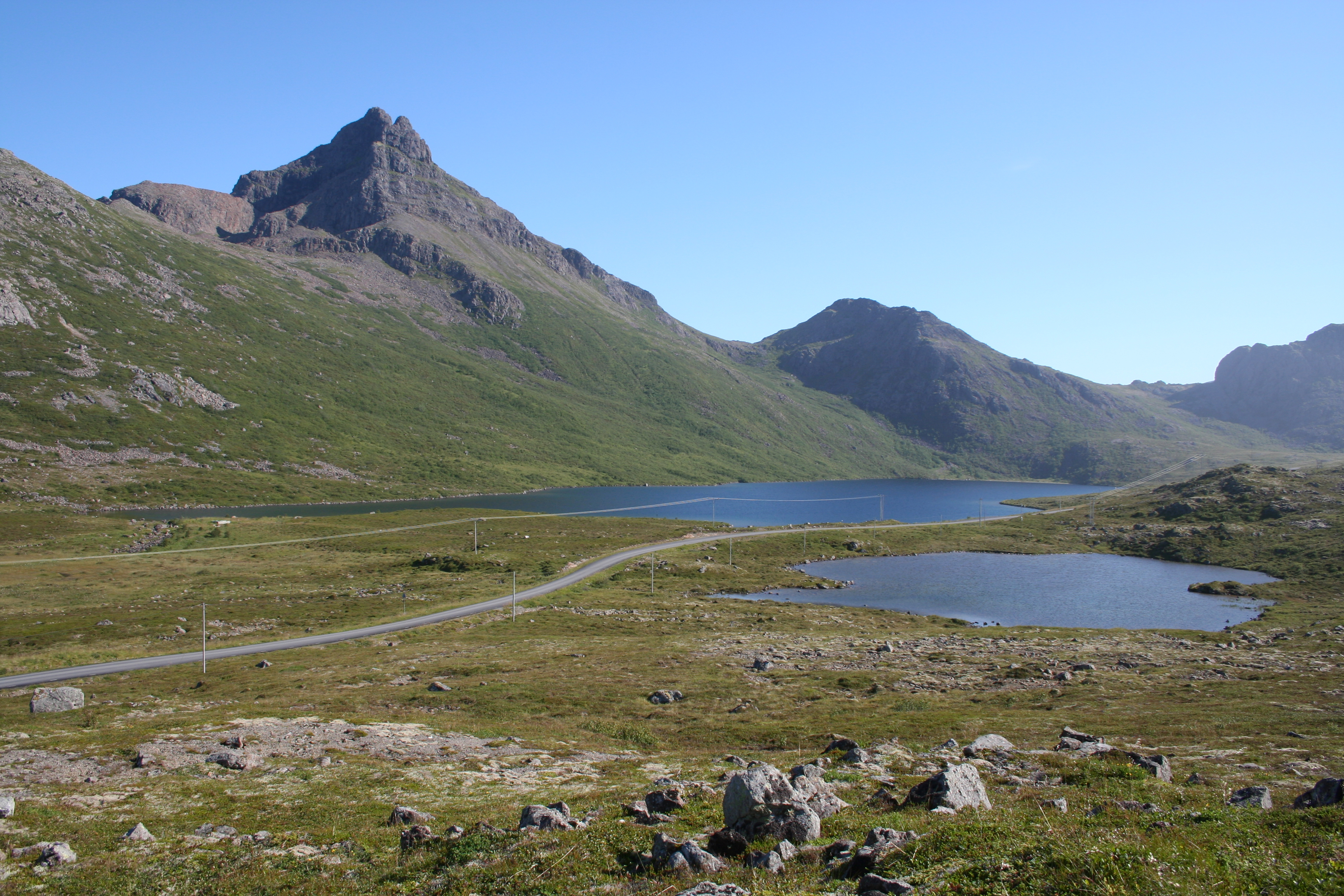
The rugged western part of Langøya near Nykvåg.

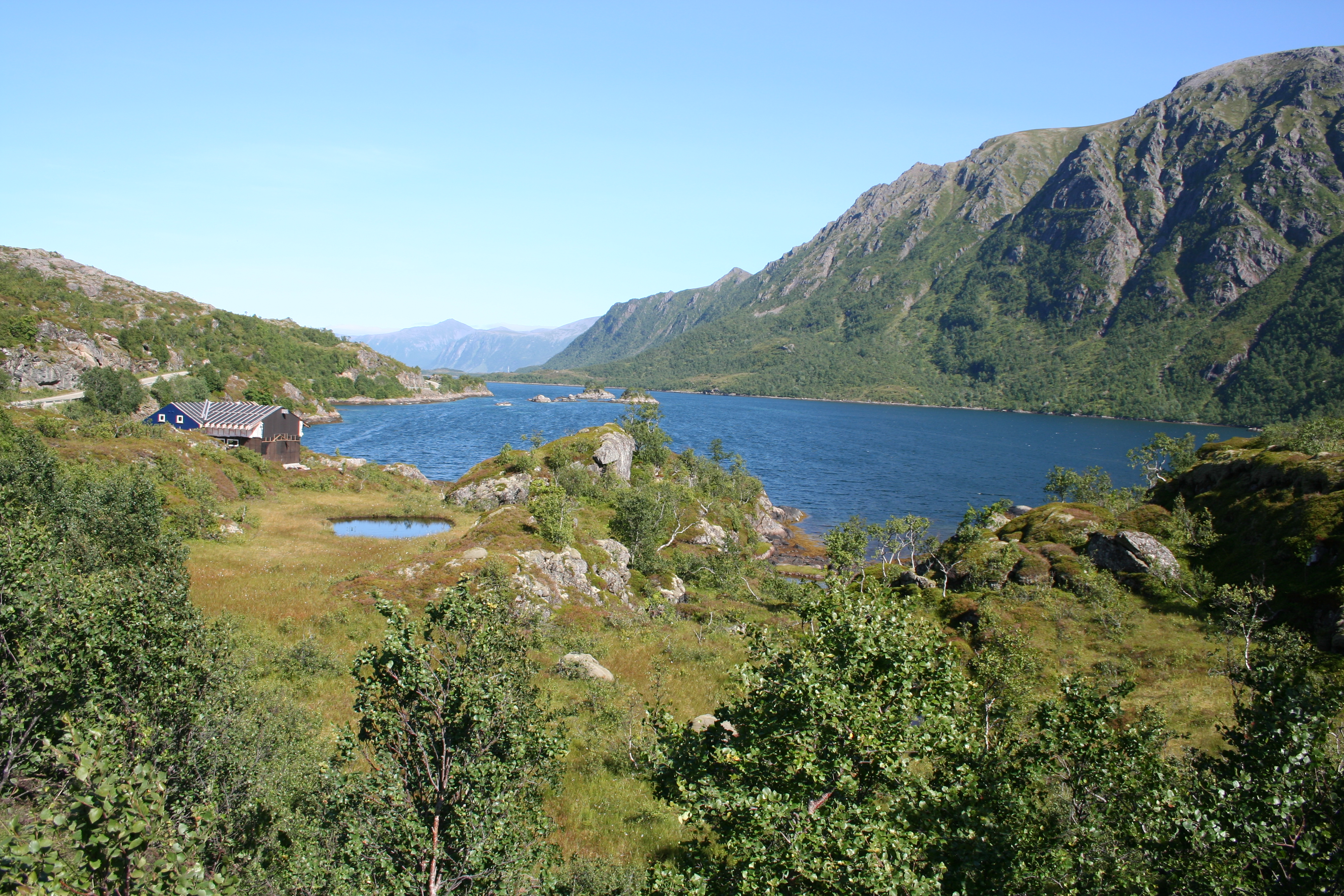
Lifjorden; many small fjords dissect Langøya

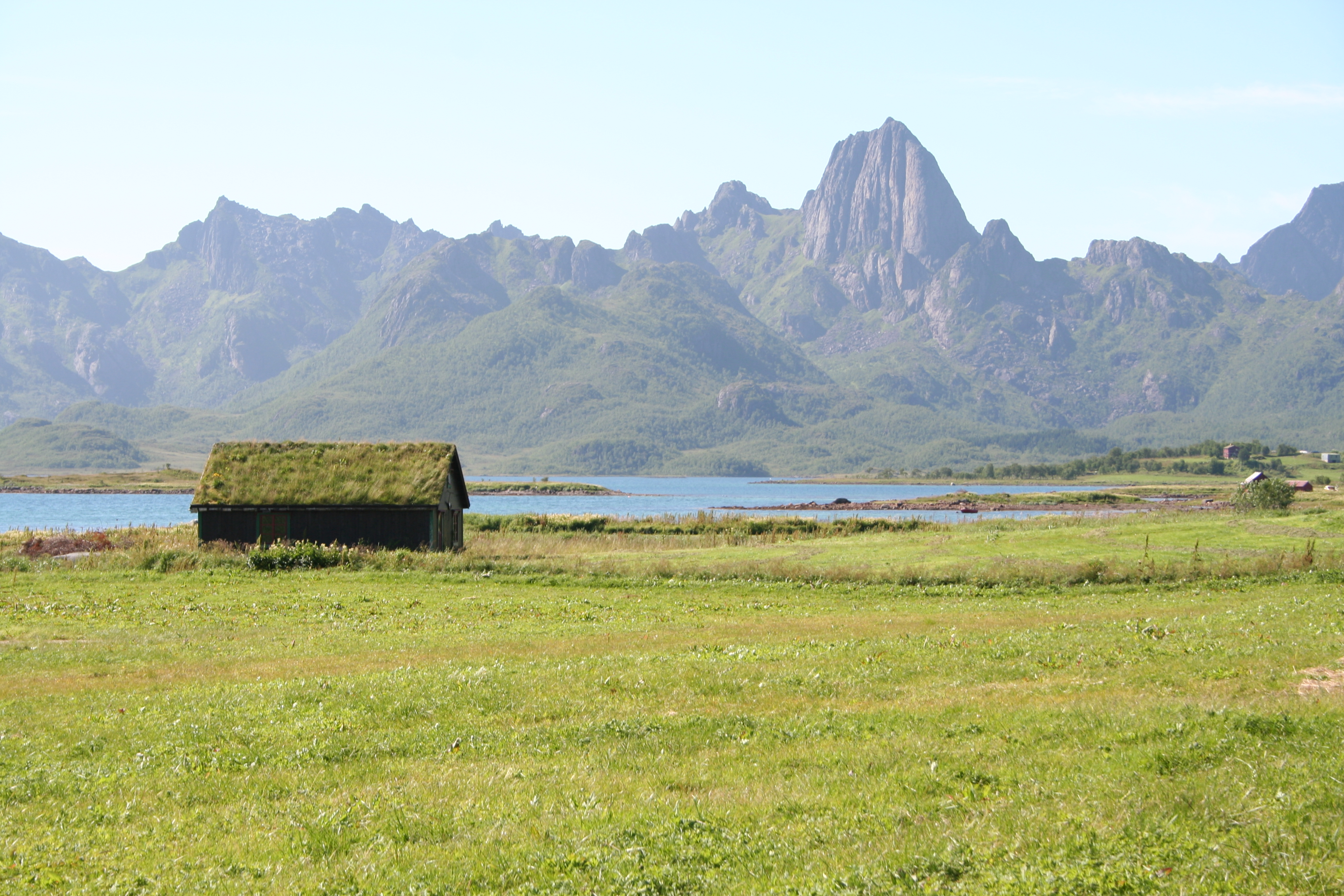
View near Frøskeland towards Ræka mt

Map of the area

== See also ==
- List of islands of Norway
