= Vesterålen =

Archipelago and district in Norway

Native name: Vesterålen (Norwegian); Viestterálas (Northern Sami)

- Location within Nordland Location within Norway

Geography
- Coordinates: 68.8364°N 14.5414°E
- Archipelago: Vesterålen archipelago
- Major islands: Langøya, Hinnøya, Andøya, Hadseløya
- Area: 2,511 km^{2} (970 sq mi)

Administration
- Norway

Demographics
- Population: 30,419

Vesterålen (English: /ˈvɛstərɔːlən/ VEST-ər-aw-lən, Norwegian: [ˈvɛ̂stəroːɫn̩]; Northern Sami: Viestterálas) is a district and archipelago in Nordland county, Norway. It is located just north of Lofoten and west of Harstad. It is the northernmost part of Nordland county. Sortland is the largest town, situated near the center of the archipelago. Vesterålen includes the municipalities of Andøy, Bø, Hadsel, Sortland, and Øksnes.

== Name ==
The Old Norse forms of the name were Vestráll and Vestrálar (plural). The first element is vestr which means "west" and the last element is áll which means "(deep and narrow) sound" or "strait". The name describes the seaway west of the island of Hinnøya. Similarly, the old name of the seaway east of Hinnøya (now called Tjeldsundet) might have been Austráll (meaning "the eastern sound/strait").

== Geography ==
Vesterålen consists of the municipalities of Andøy, Bø, Hadsel, Sortland, and Øksnes. According to some definitions, Lødingen Municipality is also included. Vesterålen is made up of several islands: Langøya, Andøya, Hadseløya, the western part of Hinnøya, the northern part of Austvågøya and several smaller islands.

The landscape is mountainous, but the mountains have a more rounded shape compared to the mountains in Lofoten. The towns and villages are situated on the strandflat (strandflaten) between the mountains and the fjords. There are also several lakes, such as Alsvågvatnet. Møysalen National Park is partly located in Vesterålen (website). The climate in Vesterålen is maritime, with mild winters considering this archipelago is well north of the Arctic Circle. Bø Municipality is the northernmost location in Norway with daily mean above 0 °C (32 °F) in all winter months.

== Transportation ==
Vesterålen is connected to the mainland and Evenes airport by bridges. It is connected to Lofoten by ferry, although since the opening of the Lofast road in December 2007, Lofoten can also be reached by road.

The coastal steamer Hurtigruten calls at the ports of Stokmarknes, Sortland, and Risøyhamn in Vesterålen. There are two regional airports: Stokmarknes Airport, Skagen for small aircraft, and Andenes Airport on Andøya.

== Economy ==
The population in Vesterålen as of 1 January 2004 was 30,648 according to Statistisk Sentralbyrå) The largest town is Sortland, but the regional hospital is in nearby Stokmarknes in Hadsel Municipality. The Royal Norwegian Air Force has based all its P-3 Orion maritime patrol aircraft at Andøya Air Station, and Andøya Rocket Range is also located at Andøya. The Norwegian Coast Guard has its northern base at Sortland (Kystvaktskvadron Nord).

Fishing, in particular cod fisheries, has always been important in Vesterålen. There is also fish farming, and some agriculture in Vesterålen.

== Media gallery ==
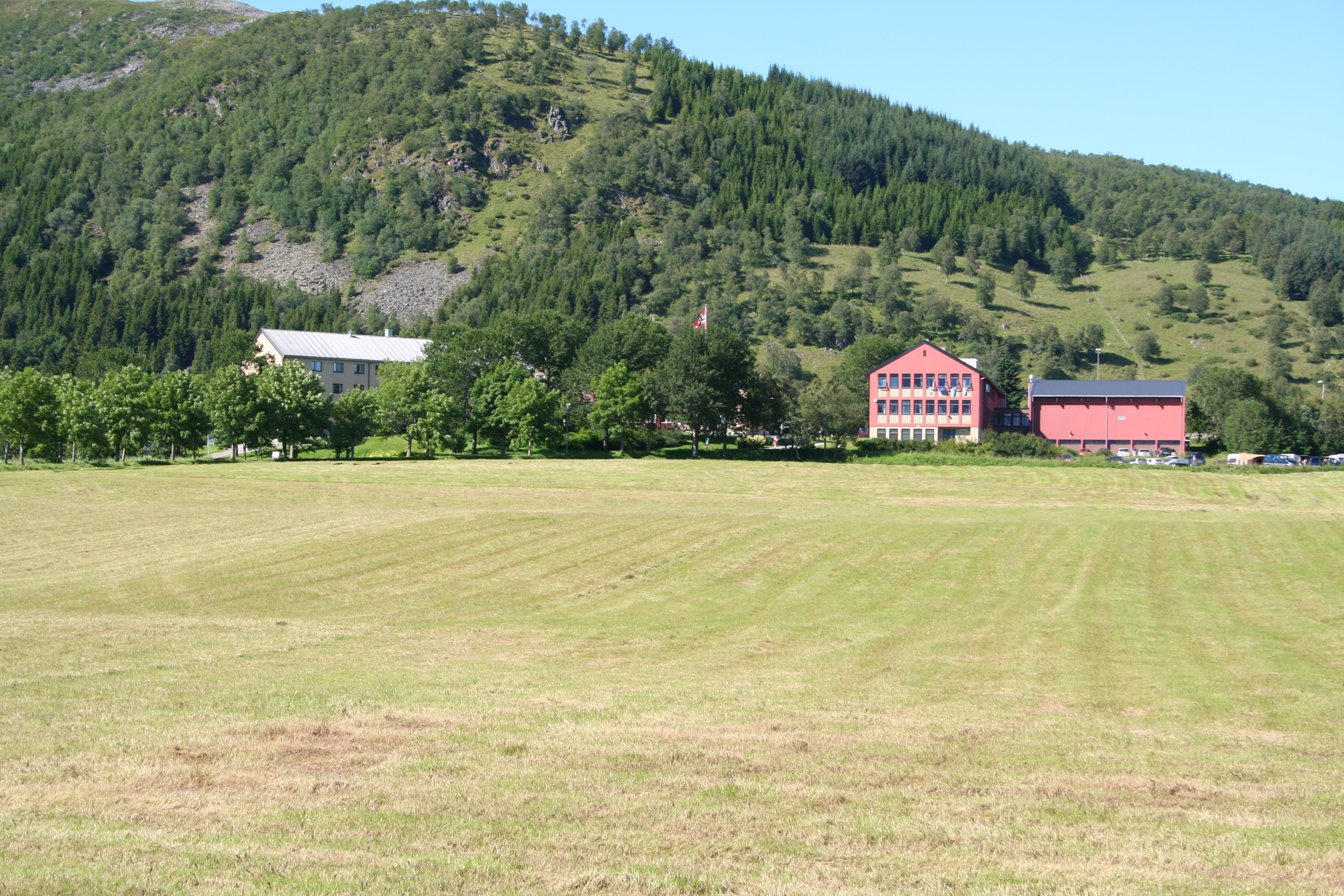
The high school for agriculture, fishing and forestry at Kleiva, Sortland municipality

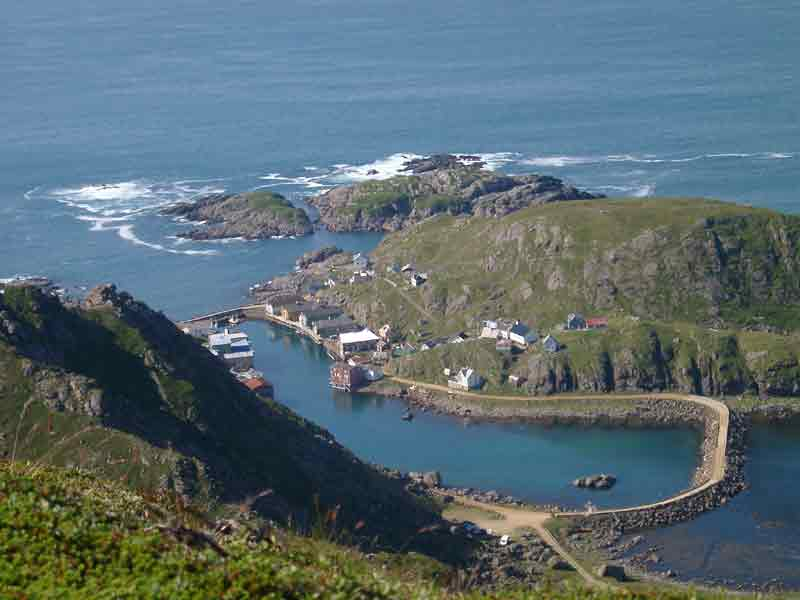
Nyksund (1 August 2004)

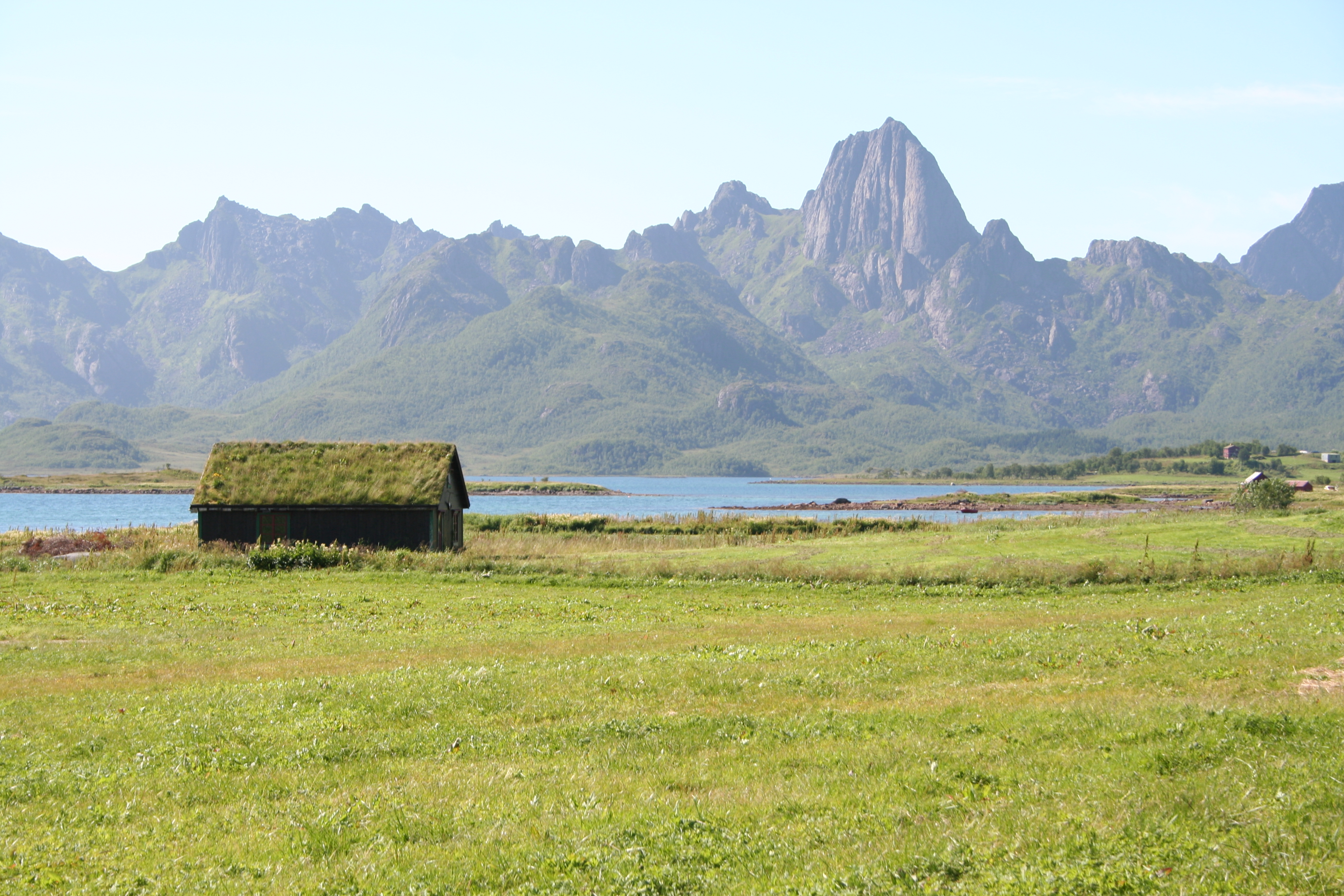
View towards Ræka, Sortland

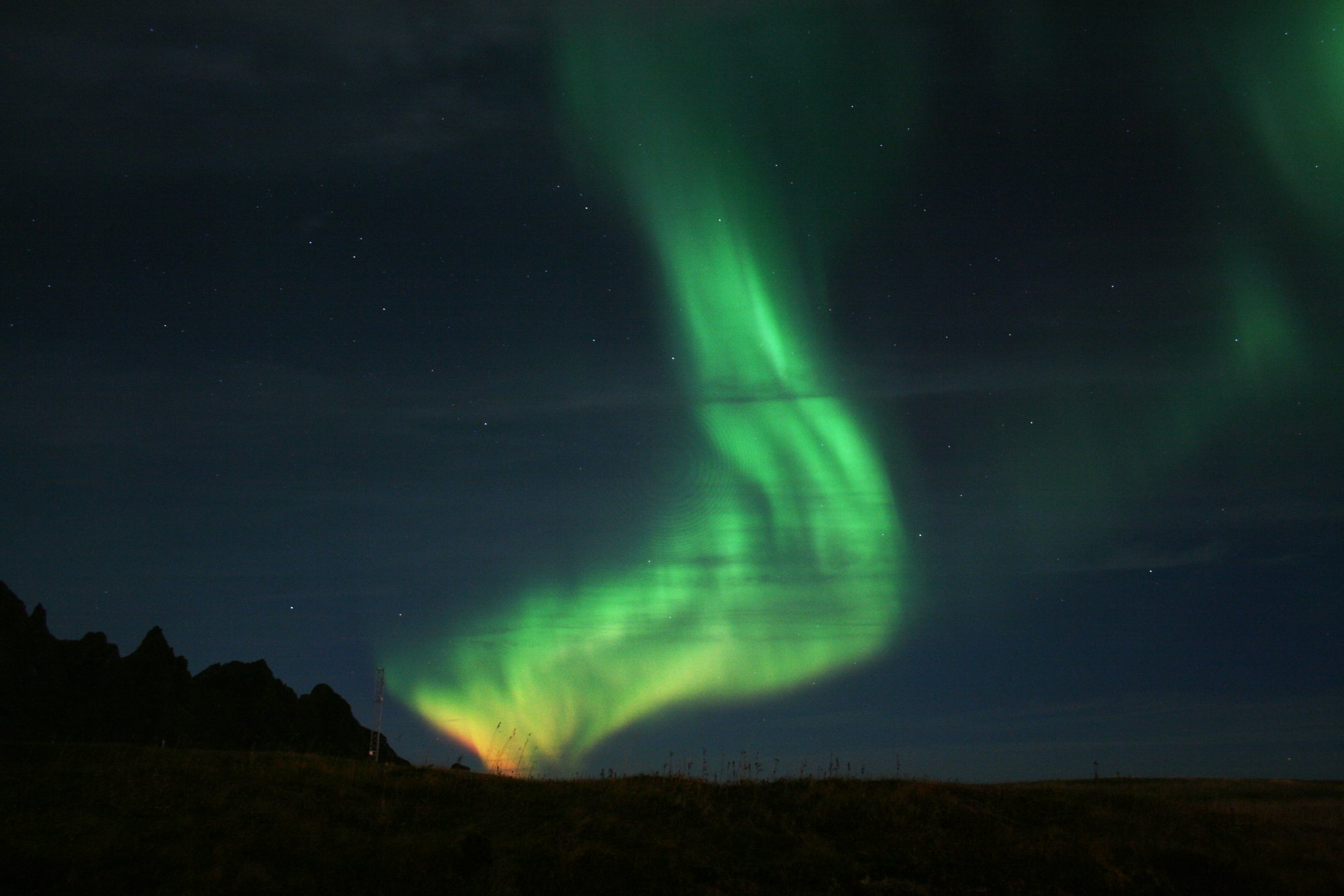
The Aurora Borealis is visible in all of Vesterålen. Andøy, October 2007.

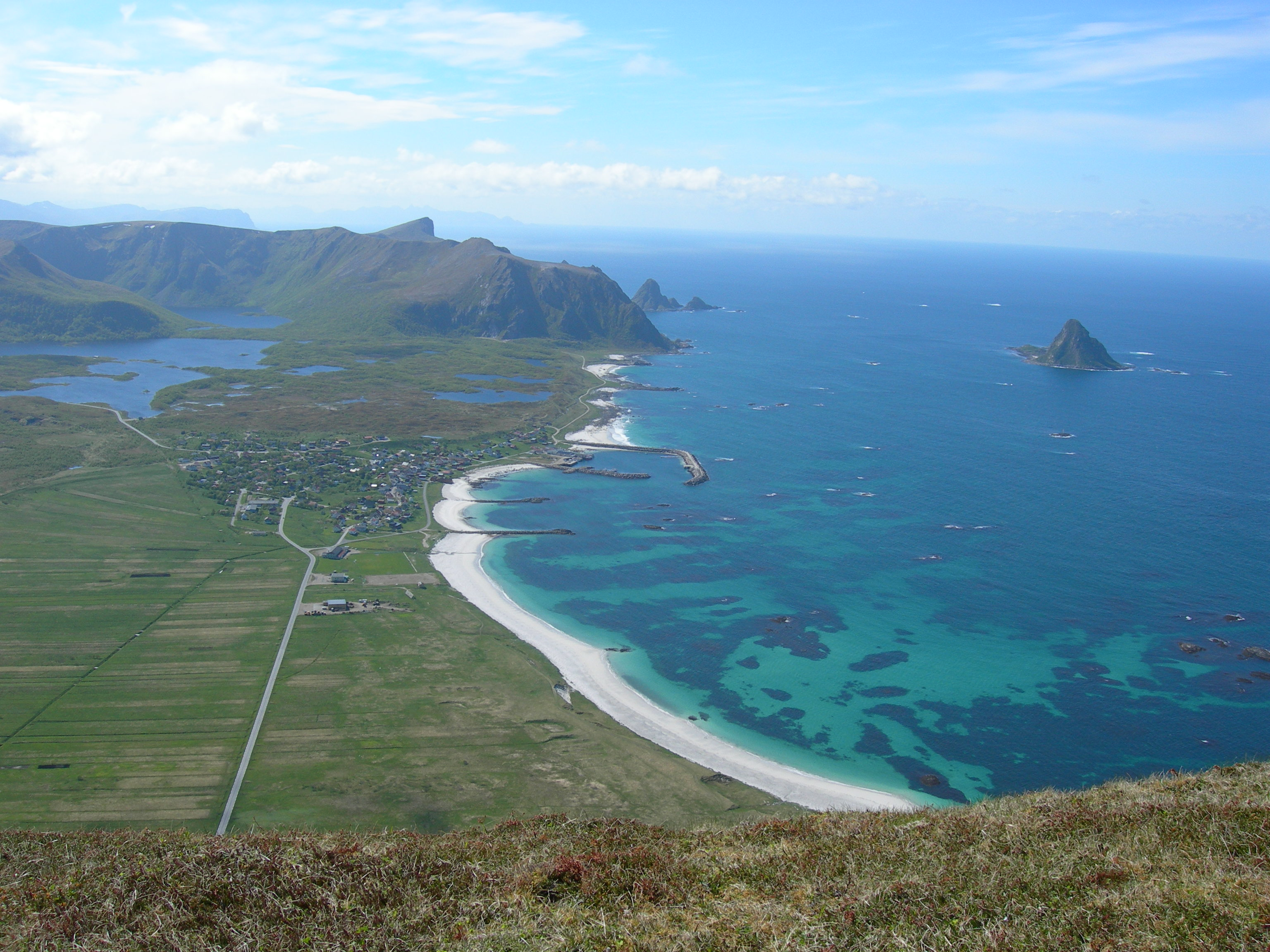
The village of Bleik in Andøy, with the long beach and a sea bird colony on the small island Bleiksøya. The deep ocean is very close to shore here, and sperm whales feed in this area.
