= List of villages in Nordland =

This is a list of villages in Nordland, a county of Norway. For other counties see the lists of villages in Norway. Villages that have co-official names in one of the Sami languages are listed with both names. The list excludes towns and cities located in Nordland. Villages that are the administrative centre of their municipality are marked (†).

Place	Coordinates	Postal Code	Municipality	District
Aldra	66°24′01″N 13°06′55″E	8732	Lurøy	Helgeland
Alterneset	66°18′29″N 14°01′33″E	8616	Rana	Helgeland
Alsvåg	68°54′08″N 15°16′35″E	8432	Øksnes	Vesterålen
Andenes (†)	69°18′51″N 16°07′09″E	8480	Andøy	Vesterålen
Ankenesstranda	68°25′18″N 17°21′54″E	8520	Narvik	Ofoten
Arstad	67°01′22″N 14°33′03″E	8110	Beiarn	Salten
Aspfjord	67°28′52″N 15°35′39″E	8226	Sørfold	Salten
Austbø	65°55′57″N 12°21′06″E	8854	Alstahaug	Helgeland
Austre Kanstad	68°27′59″N 15°53′43″E	8550	Lødingen	Ofoten
Auvåg	68°39′47″N 14°40′05″E	8475	Bø	Vesterålen
Ballangen (Norwegian); Bálák (Northern Sami)	68°20′34″N 16°49′53″E	8540	Narvik	Ofoten
Ballstad	68°04′27″N 13°32′42″E	8373	Vestvågøy	Lofoten
Bardal Indre	66°13′06″N 13°23′26″E	8890	Leirfjord	Helgeland
Barkestad	68°49′02″N 14°48′25″E	8426	Øksnes	Vesterålen
Beisfjord	68°22′34″N 17°35′45″E	8522	Narvik	Ofoten
Berg i Helgeland	65°22′16″N 12°11′42″E	8920	Sømna	Helgeland
Bindalseidet	65°07′34″N 12°14′04″E	7982	Bindal	Helgeland
Bjerka	66°08′55″N 13°50′11″E	8643	Hemnes	Helgeland
Bjerkvik	68°33′05″N 17°32′56″E	8530	Narvik	Ofoten
Bjørkåsen	68°19′49″N 16°47′23″E	8540	Narvik	Ofoten
Bjørn	66°04′51″N 12°34′48″E	8820	Dønna	Helgeland
Bjørnfjell	68°25′56″N 18°04′16″E	8517	Narvik	Ofoten
Bjørnskinn	69°00′00″N 15°37′59″E	8484	Andøy	Vesterålen
Bleik	69°16′22″N 15°57′36″E	8481	Andøy	Vesterålen
Bleikvasslia	65°54′30″N 13°48′26″E	8647	Hemnes	Helgeland
Bliksvær	67°16′38″N 14°00′13″E	8096	Bodø	Salten
Blokken	68°35′58″N 15°22′58″E	8400	Sortland	Vesterålen
Bogen i Ofoten (†)	68°31′35″N 16°59′34″E	8533	Evenes	Ofoten
Bogen	67°53′52″N 15°11′51″E	8288	Steigen	Salten
Bolga	66°48′08″N 13°14′08″E	8158	Meløy	Salten
Borg	68°14′42″N 13°45′57″E	8360	Vestvågøy	Lofoten
Botn	67°05′46″N 15°28′13″E	8250	Saltdal	Salten
Botnen	67°45′48″N 15°09′02″E	8286	Steigen	Salten
Brasøya	65°54′46″N 12°10′49″E	8842	Herøy	Helgeland
Breidstrand/Tunnstad	68°52′26″N 14°55′07″E	8428	Øksnes	Vesterålen
Breidvika	68°34′30″N 14°43′46″E	8450	Hadsel	Vesterålen
Breivik i Salten	67°12′17″N 15°09′51″E	8103	Bodø	Salten
Brettesnes	68°14′08″N 14°50′49″E	8322	Vågan	Lofoten
Bringsli	67°20′56″N 15°14′02″E	8215	Fauske	Salten
Bursimarka	67°09′27″N 15°59′19″E	8230	Fauske	Salten
Bærøyvågen	65°52′10″N 12°36′59″E	8880	Alstahaug	Helgeland
Bø	69°02′30″N 15°31′00″E	8487	Andøy	Vesterålen
Bø	68°37′14″N 14°26′47″E	8470	Bø	Vesterålen
Bø	68°39′18″N 15°19′04″E	8400	Sortland	Vesterålen
Bø	67°57′50″N 15°02′12″E	8289	Steigen	Salten
Bø	68°11′24″N 13°37′52″E	8370	Vestvågøy	Lofoten
Bøstad	68°15′06″N 13°46′07″E	8360	Vestvågøy	Lofoten
Bøstrand	68°23′12″N 16°53′20″E	8540	Narvik	Ofoten
Båsmoen	66°20′05″N 14°06′22″E	8616	Rana	Helgeland
Båtsvika	67°13′47″N 15°24′51″E	8200	Fauske	Salten
Dalsgrenda	66°15′02″N 13°59′05″E	8617	Rana	Helgeland
Digermulen	68°18′47″N 14°59′14″E	8324	Vågan	Lofoten
Drag (Norwegian); Ájluokta (Lule Sami)	68°02′40″N 16°04′46″E	8270	Hamarøy	Salten
Drageid	67°01′10″N 15°20′26″E	8250	Saltdal	Salten
Dragnes	68°57′14″N 15°38′52″E	8484	Andøy	Vesterålen
Dragvik	68°30′34″N 16°55′51″E	8534	Evenes	Ofoten
Drevjemoen	65°59′36″N 13°17′35″E	8664	Vefsn	Helgeland
Drevvassbygda	66°04′09″N 13°27′11″E	8672	Vefsn	Helgeland
Dunderland	66°26′44″N 14°50′20″E	8630	Rana	Helgeland
Dønnes	66°12′14″N 12°35′26″E	8826	Dønna	Helgeland
Eggum	68°18′29″N 13°41′04″E	8360	Vestvågøy	Lofoten
Eidbukta	66°50′37″N 13°43′50″E	8149	Meløy	Salten
Eide	68°44′14″N 14°35′10″E	8475	Bø	Vesterålen
Eiteråga	66°23′48″N 14°40′04″E	8630	Rana	Helgeland
Elsfjord	66°06′11″N 13°32′53″E	8672	Vefsn	Helgeland
Elvegård	68°15′23″N 17°24′09″E	8523	Narvik	Ofoten
Elvegårdsmoen	68°32′47″N 17°36′37″E	8530	Narvik	Ofoten
Elvenes	68°48′45″N 15°10′12″E	8430	Øksnes	Vesterålen
Engavågen	66°46′41″N 13°31′57″E	8170	Meløy	Salten
Erikstad	68°24′51″N 15°50′01″E	8550	Lødingen	Ofoten
Ertenvåg	67°07′31″N 14°19′06″E	8120	Gildeskål	Salten
Evenes	68°27′31″N 16°41′58″E	8536	Evenes	Ofoten
Evenesmarka	68°29′39″N 16°44′34″E	8534	Evenes	Ofoten
Fagernes	68°24′42″N 17°25′51″E	8514	Narvik	Ofoten
Fallmoen	65°40′30″N 13°15′22″E	8680	Grane	Helgeland
Fenes	67°23′00″N 14°15′16″E	8020	Bodø	Salten
Festvåg	67°26′07″N 14°46′12″E	8016	Bodø	Salten
Finneidfjord	66°11′14″N 13°47′27″E	8642	Hemnes	Helgeland
Finnvåg	68°48′22″N 14°46′22″E	8426	Øksnes	Vesterålen
Finnøya	68°00′08″N 15°29′48″E	8260	Hamarøy	Salten
Fiskenes	69°15′40″N 16°10′03″E	8485	Andøy	Vesterålen
Fjær	67°30′08″N 14°42′44″E	8093	Bodø	Salten
Fjærvoll	68°39′08″N 14°26′45″E	8470	Bø	Vesterålen
Flakstad	68°06′20″N 13°18′00″E	8380	Flakstad	Lofoten
Flostrand	66°20′10″N 13°22′08″E	8725	Rana	Helgeland
Forstranda	67°00′34″N 13°57′53″E	8140	Gildeskål	Salten
Forvika (†)	65°42′55″N 12°27′46″E	8976	Vevelstad	Helgeland
Fredvang	68°05′02″N 13°10′00″E	8387	Flakstad	Lofoten
Frøskeland	68°45′31″N 15°07′16″E	8400	Sortland	Vesterålen
Gimstad	68°38′26″N 14°26′27″E	8470	Bø	Vesterålen
Gimsøy	68°19′14″N 14°14′28″E	8314	Vågan	Lofoten
Givær	67°18′17″N 13°41′08″E	8097	Bodø	Salten
Gjerstad	68°36′58″N 15°09′12″E	8450	Hadsel	Vesterålen
Gjerøy/Gjerdøya	66°36′48″N 12°59′26″E	8195	Rødøy	Helgeland
Gladstad (†)	65°40′38″N 11°57′40″E	8980	Vega	Helgeland
Glein	66°09′28″N 12°36′50″E	8820	Dønna	Helgeland
Glomfjord	66°48′59″N 13°56′38″E	8160	Meløy	Salten
Godøya	67°14′10″N 14°41′31″E	8056	Bodø	Salten
Godøynes	67°16′09″N 14°43′50″E	8050	Bodø	Salten
Grane	65°35′06″N 13°23′34″E	8680	Grane	Helgeland
Granmoen	65°58′33″N 13°12′44″E	8664	Vefsn	Helgeland
Gravdal	68°07′17″N 13°30′11″E	8372	Vestvågøy	Lofoten
Gravermarka	68°18′03″N 14°19′00″E	8313	Vågan	Lofoten
Grubben (Norwegian); Gråbpoe (Southern Sami)	65°39′48″N 14°08′10″E	8690	Hattfjelldal	Helgeland
Grytting	68°36′35″N 15°07′03″E	8450	Hadsel	Vesterålen
Grønning	68°39′59″N 14°56′48″E	8450	Hadsel	Vesterålen
Guvåg	68°39′51″N 14°45′30″E	8475	Bø	Vesterålen
Hagvågen	68°15′21″N 13°46′53″E	8360	Vestvågøy	Lofoten
Halsa i Helgeland	66°44′43″N 13°33′20″E	8178	Meløy	Salten
Hamnøya	67°56′49″N 13°07′51″E	8390	Moskenes	Lofoten
Hattfjelldal (Norwegian) (†); Aarporte (Southern Sami)	65°35′52″N 13°59′03″E	8690	Hattfjelldal	Helgeland
Haug	68°08′13″N 13°31′38″E	8372	Vestvågøy	Lofoten
Haugland	66°23′05″N 13°06′24″E	8730	Lurøy	Helgeland
Haukenes	67°32′46″N 15°15′37″E	8220	Sørfold	Salten
Hauknes	66°17′12″N 14°03′28″E	8618	Rana	Helgeland
Helland	67°22′29″N 15°37′37″E	8226	Sørfold	Salten
Helligvær	67°26′31″N 13°53′43″E	8095	Bodø	Salten
Hellmobotn	67°48′51″N 16°30′58″E	8274	Hamarøy	Salten
Hemnesberget	66°13′29″N 13°36′59″E	8640	Hemnes	Helgeland
Hennes	68°31′54″N 15°13′27″E	8414	Hadsel	Vesterålen
Henningsvær	68°08′56″N 14°12′07″E	8312	Vågan	Lofoten
Hesstun	65°41′30″N 12°23′48″E	8978	Vevelstad	Helgeland
Hestad	66°03′15″N 12°31′04″E	8820	Dønna	Helgeland
Higrav	68°21′53″N 14°45′42″E	8316	Hadsel	Vesterålen
Hjemås	67°17′29″N 15°25′45″E	8200	Fauske	Salten
Holand	68°38′33″N 15°16′06″E	8400	Sortland	Vesterålen
Holand	65°42′19″N 11°54′46″E	8980	Vega	Helgeland
Holandsvika	65°56′49″N 13°09′12″E	8664	Vefsn	Helgeland
Holkestad	67°52′48″N 14°53′31″E	8288	Steigen	Salten
Holm	65°11′01″N 12°07′30″E	7982	Bindal	Helgeland
Holmstad	68°43′29″N 15°08′42″E	8400	Sortland	Vesterålen
Homborneset	65°19′50″N 12°21′05″E	8920	Sømna	Helgeland
Hommelstø	65°24′26″N 12°33′07″E	8960	Brønnøy	Helgeland
Hopen	68°11′38″N 14°20′46″E	8310	Vågan	Lofoten
Hovden i Vesterålen	68°48′49″N 14°33′07″E	8475	Bø	Vesterålen
Hundholmen (Norwegian); Benasuoloj (Lule Sami)	68°08′49″N 16°16′08″E	8590	Narvik	Ofoten
Husby	66°13′28″N 12°46′06″E	8723	Nesna	Helgeland
Husvik	65°49′47″N 12°39′54″E	8883	Vefsn	Helgeland
Husvær	65°54′55″N 12°07′07″E	8842	Herøy	Helgeland
Husøya	67°59′11″N 15°28′16″E	8290	Hamarøy	Salten
Husøya (†)	66°29′43″N 12°04′29″E	8770	Træna	Helgeland
Hølen	66°05′09″N 12°26′53″E	8820	Dønna	Helgeland
Høyforsmoen	66°54′34″N 14°44′57″E	8114	Beiarn	Salten
Høyholm	65°38′23″N 12°22′19″E	8976	Vevelstad	Helgeland
Håkvik (Norwegian); Ginnasluokta (Northern Sami)	68°24′18″N 17°18′29″E	8520	Narvik	Ofoten
Igerøy	65°40′58″N 12°07′32″E	8980	Vega	Helgeland
Indre Låvong	66°09′14″N 13°06′07″E	8890	Leirfjord	Helgeland
Indreskomo	65°28′35″N 12°21′53″E	8900	Brønnøy	Helgeland
Inndyr (†)	67°02′01″N 14°01′39″E	8140	Gildeskål	Salten
Innerkvarøya	66°29′18″N 12°57′37″E	8743	Lurøy	Helgeland
Innhavet	67°57′58″N 15°55′58″E	8260	Hamarøy	Salten
Jektvika	66°37′33″N 13°17′31″E	8187	Rødøy	Helgeland
Junkerdal	66°48′40″N 15°34′18″E	8255	Saltdal	Salten
Kabelvåg	68°12′41″N 14°28′54″E	8310	Vågan	Lofoten
Kaldvåg	68°02′42″N 15°43′50″E	8276	Hamarøy	Salten
Kaljord	68°31′32″N 15°16′23″E	8414	Hadsel	Vesterålen
Kanstadbotnen	68°30′45″N 15°53′19″E	8550	Lødingen	Ofoten
Karlsøy	68°00′02″N 15°45′52″E	8260	Hamarøy	Salten
Kavåsen	68°47′49″N 15°01′22″E	8400	Øksnes	Vesterålen
Kila	66°41′34″N 13°24′12″E	8186	Rødøy	Helgeland
Kilboghamn	66°29′15″N 13°13′35″E	8752	Rødøy	Helgeland
Kjelde	68°25′09″N 16°37′49″E	8543	Narvik	Ofoten
Kjeldebotn (Norwegian); Gálldo (Northern Sami)	68°24′19″N 16°39′42″E	8543	Narvik	Ofoten
Kjelkvika (Norwegian); Gielkká (Lule Sami)	68°08′35″N 16°20′51″E	8590	Narvik	Ofoten
Kjerkfjorden	67°59′33″N 13°00′46″E	8390	Moskenes	Lofoten
Kjerkøya	65°42′28″N 11°55′07″E	8980	Vega	Helgeland
Kjerringnes	68°39′52″N 15°29′15″E	8400	Sortland	Vesterålen
Kjerringøy	67°31′10″N 14°45′48″E	8093	Bodø	Salten
Kjøpsvik (Norwegian); Gásluokta (Lule Sami)	68°05′49″N 16°22′26″E	8590	Narvik	Ofoten
Klakk	68°31′56″N 14°58′04″E	8450	Hadsel	Vesterålen
Kleppstad	68°15′19″N 14°16′22″E	8313	Vågan	Lofoten
Klo	68°58′57″N 15°10′33″E	8430	Øksnes	Vesterålen
Knutstad	68°16′17″N 13°55′41″E	8360	Vestvågøy	Lofoten
Kobbvika	68°20′05″N 16°20′49″E	8540	Narvik	Ofoten
Konsvikosen	66°29′59″N 13°06′12″E	8752	Lurøy	Helgeland
Korgen (†)	66°04′35″N 13°49′19″E	8646	Hemnes	Helgeland
Korsnes (Norwegian); Hierenjárgga (Lule Sami)	68°15′07″N 16°03′24″E	8275	Hamarøy	Salten
Kosmoen	67°20′43″N 15°16′12″E	8215	Fauske	Salten
Krutåga (Norwegian); Kruvhtege (Southern Sami)	65°41′15″N 14°10′12″E	8690	Hattfjelldal	Helgeland
Krystad	68°03′27″N 13°09′16″E	8387	Flakstad	Lofoten
Kvannkjosen	68°22′19″N 15°14′16″E	8581	Lødingen	Ofoten
Kvina	66°28′02″N 13°10′03″E	8752	Lurøy	Helgeland
Kvitblik	67°20′48″N 15°30′02″E	8200	Fauske	Salten
Kviting	66°02′12″N 12°57′27″E	8890	Leirfjord	Helgeland
Kvitnes	68°34′20″N 15°13′26″E	8413	Hadsel	Vesterålen
Lakså	68°30′16″N 16°54′57″E	8534	Evenes	Ofoten
Lande	65°15′04″N 12°47′27″E	8960	Brønnøy	Helgeland
Langset	67°08′12″N 15°27′06″E	8250	Saltdal	Salten
Laukvika	68°23′24″N 14°26′29″E	8315	Vågan	Lofoten
Laupstad	68°21′26″N 14°43′23″E	8316	Vågan	Lofoten
Leines	66°02′37″N 12°42′09″E	8890	Leirfjord	Helgeland
Leines	67°44′13″N 14°47′53″E	8285	Steigen	Salten
Leinesfjorden (†)	67°46′31″N 15°00′55″E	8283	Steigen	Salten
Leira	66°04′38″N 13°03′13″E	8890	Leirfjord	Helgeland
Leiren	65°25′33″N 13°39′37″E	8680	Grane	Helgeland
Leirfjordgården	67°34′33″N 15°46′22″E	8264	Sørfold	Salten
Lekanger	67°06′49″N 14°02′01″E	8130	Gildeskål	Salten
Leland (†)	66°03′49″N 12°56′45″E	8890	Leirfjord	Helgeland
Lenvika	68°30′35″N 17°03′31″E	8533	Evenes	Ofoten
Liland	68°28′34″N 16°53′03″E	8534	Evenes	Ofoten
Liland	68°44′42″N 15°30′12″E	8400	Sortland	Vesterålen
Liland	68°20′11″N 14°44′44″E	8316	Vågan	Lofoten
Lovund	66°21′56″N 12°21′34″E	8764	Lurøy	Helgeland
Lurøy (†)	66°25′06″N 12°50′57″E	8766	Lurøy	Helgeland
Lysfjord	65°06′48″N 12°05′12″E	7982	Bindal	Helgeland
Løding	67°18′02″N 14°44′18″E	8050	Bodø	Salten
Lødingen (†)	68°24′26″N 15°59′31″E	8550	Lødingen	Ofoten
Lønsdal	66°44′35″N 15°27′48″E	8255	Saltdal	Salten
Løpsmarka	67°18′48″N 14°26′52″E	8015	Bodø	Salten
Majavatn	65°09′57″N 13°22′11″E	8680	Grane	Helgeland
Mehus	68°47′08″N 15°56′59″E	8407	Sortland	Vesterålen
Melbu	68°30′16″N 14°49′47″E	8445	Hadsel	Vesterålen
Melfjordbotn	66°30′56″N 13°40′43″E	8182	Rødøy	Helgeland
Meløy	66°49′24″N 13°24′23″E	8157	Meløy	Salten
Mevik	66°56′40″N 13°44′24″E	8145	Gildeskål	Salten
Misvær	67°06′54″N 15°00′18″E	8255	Bodø	Salten
Moldjord (†)	67°00′21″N 14°34′27″E	8110	Beiarn	Salten
Moskenes	67°54′09″N 13°02′38″E	8392	Moskenes	Lofoten
Musken (Norwegian); Måsske (Lule Sami)	67°53′17″N 16°13′27″E	8274	Hamarøy	Salten
Myken	66°45′41″N 12°28′53″E	8181	Rødøy	Helgeland
Myklebostad	67°20′54″N 14°33′04″E	8016	Bodø	Salten
Myklebustad	66°18′17″N 13°29′32″E	8725	Rana	Helgeland
Myre	69°06′19″N 15°57′46″E	8485	Andøy	Vesterålen
Myre (†)	68°54′54″N 15°04′17″E	8430	Øksnes	Vesterålen
Mæla	66°18′23″N 13°33′37″E	8725	Rana	Helgeland
Mårnes	67°08′42″N 14°05′24″E	8130	Gildeskål	Salten
Napp	68°07′59″N 13°25′54″E	8382	Flakstad	Lofoten
Naurstad	67°16′27″N 14°50′14″E	8050	Bodø	Salten
Nesberg/Nes	68°00′09″N 15°25′15″E	8290	Hamarøy	Salten
Nesna (†)	66°11′48″N 13°01′16″E	8700	Nesna	Helgeland
Nesset	67°31′36″N 12°08′00″E	8064	Røst	Lofoten
Nevernes	66°22′51″N 14°34′19″E	8630	Rana	Helgeland
Nordarnøya	67°09′13″N 13°59′50″E	8136	Gildeskål	Salten
Nordfold	67°45′47″N 15°13′53″E	8286	Steigen	Salten
Nordhorsfjord	65°07′04″N 11°59′52″E	7982	Bindal	Helgeland
Nordland	67°41′36″N 12°42′11″E	8063	Værøy	Lofoten
Nordmela	69°08′04″N 15°40′29″E	8489	Andøy	Vesterålen
Nordnesøya	66°35′35″N 12°38′26″E	8198	Rødøy	Helgeland
Nordskot	67°49′54″N 14°48′05″E	8283	Steigen	Salten
Nordstaulen	66°02′22″N 12°17′56″E	8850	Herøy	Helgeland
Nusfjord	68°02′07″N 13°20′52″E	8380	Flakstad	Lofoten
Nyksund	68°59′44″N 15°01′23″E	8430	Øksnes	Vesterålen
Nykvåg	68°46′36″N 14°28′05″E	8475	Bø	Vesterålen
Nystad	67°20′05″N 15°15′46″E	8215	Fauske	Salten
Nøss	69°04′38″N 15°33′40″E	8488	Andøy	Vesterålen
Oldervika	66°30′20″N 13°18′33″E	8190	Rødøy	Helgeland
Ongstad	68°30′50″N 14°43′37″E	8445	Hadsel	Vesterålen
Oppeid (†)	68°05′06″N 15°36′11″E	8294	Hamarøy	Salten
Presteid	68°05′05″N 15°38′45″E	8294	Hamarøy	Salten
Prestøya	65°54′45″N 12°09′28″E	8842	Herøy	Helgeland
Raften	68°23′57″N 15°07′48″E	8325	Hadsel	Vesterålen
Ramberg	68°38′01″N 14°37′27″E	8470	Bø	Vesterålen
Ramberg (†)	68°05′23″N 13°13′47″E	8380	Flakstad	Lofoten
Reine (†)	67°55′56″N 13°05′22″E	8390	Moskenes	Lofoten
Reipå	66°54′43″N 13°38′27″E	8146	Meløy	Salten
Repp	68°11′32″N 13°35′59″E	8370	Vestvågøy	Lofoten
Ringstad	68°39′18″N 14°38′12″E	8475	Bø	Vesterålen
Rinøya	68°22′34″N 15°45′21″E	8581	Lødingen	Ofoten
Rise	68°43′38″N 14°35′48″E	8475	Bø	Vesterålen
Risøyhamn	68°58′23″N 15°38′05″E	8484	Andøy	Vesterålen
Rognan (†)	67°05′43″N 15°23′16″E	8250	Saltdal	Salten
Russånes	66°55′36″N 15°19′19″E	8255	Saltdal	Salten
Rødøy	66°39′33″N 13°04′39″E	8193	Rødøy	Helgeland
Røkland	66°59′15″N 15°19′00″E	8255	Saltdal	Salten
Rørstad	67°35′21″N 15°13′31″E	8220	Sørfold	Salten
Rørvika (Norwegian); Ráluokta (Lule Sami)	68°08′09″N 16°07′00″E	8275	Hamarøy	Salten
Røssnesvågen	67°39′15″N 12°43′18″E	8063	Værøy	Lofoten
Røssvoll	66°21′30″N 14°19′29″E	8615	Rana	Helgeland
Røstlandet (†)	67°31′27″N 12°06′54″E	8064	Røst	Lofoten
Røsvika	67°28′57″N 15°27′15″E	8220	Sørfold	Salten
Røvika	67°16′20″N 15°14′05″E	8200	Fauske	Salten
Sagfjorden	67°36′42″N 15°25′42″E	8220	Sørfold	Salten
Salhus	65°29′18″N 12°13′49″E	8900	Brønnøy	Helgeland
Saltstraumen	67°14′00″N 14°37′30″E	8056	Bodø	Salten
Sanden	68°25′57″N 14°37′16″E	8317	Hadsel	Vesterålen
Sandnes	68°35′07″N 14°54′30″E	8450	Hadsel	Vesterålen
Sandset	68°47′37″N 14°55′58″E	8408	Øksnes	Vesterålen
Sandstrand	68°44′38″N 15°20′45″E	8400	Sortland	Vesterålen
Sandvika	67°11′00″N 14°14′26″E	8130	Gildeskål	Salten
Sandværet	65°53′42″N 11°59′13″E	8844	Herøy	Helgeland
Sandåker	66°08′59″N 12°43′51″E	8813	Dønna	Helgeland
Sanna	66°30′20″N 12°02′48″E	8770	Træna	Helgeland
Saura	66°13′57″N 12°59′19″E	8724	Nesna	Helgeland
Saura	67°06′02″N 14°18′24″E	8120	Gildeskål	Salten
Saursfjord	67°47′37″N 15°03′13″E	8283	Steigen	Salten
Selfors	66°19′39″N 14°10′37″E	8613	Rana	Helgeland
Selvær	66°35′14″N 12°14′30″E	8742	Træna	Helgeland
Selsøya	66°32′57″N 12°50′33″E	8197	Rødøy	Helgeland
Seløya	66°01′38″N 12°13′48″E	8850	Herøy	Helgeland
Sennesvik	68°06′44″N 13°42′29″E	8352	Vestvågøy	Lofoten
Setså	67°09′56″N 15°29′14″E	8250	Saltdal	Salten
Sigerfjord	68°38′41″N 15°30′28″E	8400	Sortland	Vesterålen
Silvalen (†)	65°59′06″N 12°17′17″E	8850	Herøy	Helgeland
Skagen	68°34′56″N 15°02′39″E	8450	Hadsel	Vesterålen
Skarberget (Norwegian); Skárffabákte (Lule Sami)	68°13′52″N 16°14′22″E	8540	Narvik	Ofoten
Skarstad	68°22′03″N 16°16′46″E	8540	Narvik	Ofoten
Skarstein	69°14′58″N 16°07′45″E	8485	Andøy	Vesterålen
Skipbåtsvær	66°07′45″N 12°02′07″E	8850	Herøy	Helgeland
Skjelsviksjøen	65°10′50″N 12°15′54″E	7982	Bindal	Helgeland
Skjerstad	67°13′57″N 15°01′17″E	8102	Bodø	Salten
Skjoldehamn	68°52′50″N 15°30′30″E	8484	Andøy	Vesterålen
Skjombotn	68°11′27″N 17°18′52″E	8523	Narvik	Ofoten
Skonseng	66°21′21″N 14°20′14″E	8615	Rana	Helgeland
Skrova	68°09′10″N 14°38′56″E	8320	Vågan	Lofoten
Skutvika	68°01′00″N 15°19′39″E	8290	Hamarøy	Salten
Skånland	67°54′06″N 15°04′38″E	8288	Steigen	Salten
Skårvågen	68°40′45″N 14°25′03″E	8475	Bø	Vesterålen
Sleneset	66°21′40″N 12°36′23″E	8762	Lurøy	Helgeland
Snubba	68°31′24″N 17°08′21″E	8533	Evenes	Ofoten
Soksenvika	67°06′31″N 15°27′40″E	8250	Saltdal	Salten
Solfjellsjøen (†)	66°06′32″N 12°29′25″E	8820	Dønna	Helgeland
Solheim	67°55′36″N 15°00′23″E	8289	Steigen	Salten
Sommersel	68°09′56″N 15°42′12″E	8297	Hamarøy	Salten
Stamsund	68°07′33″N 13°48′19″E	8340	Vestvågøy	Lofoten
Stamsvika	67°40′59″N 15°01′25″E	8286	Steigen	Salten
Stave	69°12′53″N 15°51′28″E	8489	Andøy	Vesterålen
Stokka	65°45′28″N 12°33′54″E	8870	Vevelstad	Helgeland
Stokkvågen	66°20′17″N 13°00′54″E	8735	Lurøy	Helgeland
Stor-Glea	67°30′23″N 12°04′08″E	8064	Røst	Lofoten
Storforshei	66°24′05″N 14°32′07″E	8630	Rana	Helgeland
Storjord i Beiarn	66°59′21″N 14°45′31″E	8110	Beiarn	Salten
Storvika	66°57′46″N 13°48′30″E	8145	Gildeskål	Salten
Storå (Norwegian); Jågåsijdda (Lule Sami)	68°04′22″N 16°23′22″E	8587	Narvik	Ofoten
Straume (†)	68°41′19″N 14°28′19″E	8475	Bø	Vesterålen
Straumen (†)	67°20′51″N 15°36′17″E	8226	Sørfold	Salten
Straumnes	68°23′35″N 14°27′58″E	8315	Vågan	Lofoten
Straumsnes	67°18′01″N 15°11′07″E	8215	Fauske	Salten
Straumsnes	68°26′02″N 17°39′23″E	8517	Narvik	Ofoten
Strand	68°41′14″N 15°27′58″E	8400	Sortland	Vesterålen
Strendene	65°26′19″N 13°24′16″E	8680	Grane	Helgeland
Strengelvåg	68°57′33″N 15°10′32″E	8426	Øksnes	Vesterålen
Stuvland	66°25′48″N 13°02′38″E	8733	Lurøy	Helgeland
Styrkesvik	67°30′52″N 15°31′09″E	8264	Sørfold	Salten
Stø	69°01′06″N 15°07′21″E	8438	Øksnes	Vesterålen
Støtt	66°55′28″N 13°26′41″E	8159	Meløy	Salten
Sulitjelma (Norwegian); Sulisjielmmá (Lule Sami)	67°07′58″N 16°04′35″E	8230	Fauske	Salten
Sund	68°44′33″N 14°36′55″E	8475	Bø	Vesterålen
Sund	67°04′31″N 14°03′24″E	8140	Gildeskål	Salten
Sund	66°12′28″N 13°38′59″E	8640	Hemnes	Helgeland
Sund i Lofoten	68°00′18″N 13°12′28″E	8384	Flakstad	Lofoten
Sundøya	65°59′34″N 12°51′01″E	8679	Leirfjord	Helgeland
Svenskvollen	65°23′45″N 14°00′41″E	8690	Hattfjelldal	Helgeland
Sydalen	68°17′14″N 14°20′17″E	8313	Vågan	Lofoten
Søfting	65°54′42″N 13°10′26″E	8664	Vefsn	Helgeland
Sør-Steiro	68°40′10″N 15°21′44″E	8400	Sortland	Vesterålen
Sørarnøy	67°08′10″N 13°58′00″E	8135	Gildeskål	Salten
Sørfinnset	66°58′40″N 13°58′59″E	8140	Gildeskål	Salten
Sørfjorden	66°28′37″N 13°15′28″E	8190	Rødøy	Helgeland
Sørfugløy	67°03′12″N 13°46′29″E	8135	Gildeskål	Salten
Sørhorsfjord	65°06′06″N 11°59′20″E	7982	Bindal	Helgeland
Sørland (†)	67°39′52″N 12°41′36″E	8063	Værøy	Lofoten
Sørmela	68°59′08″N 15°26′38″E	8484	Andøy	Vesterålen
Sørskot	67°48′33″N 14°47′16″E	8283	Steigen	Salten
Sørvær	67°24′09″N 13°54′13″E	8095	Bodø	Salten
Sørvågen	67°53′21″N 13°00′57″E	8392	Moskenes	Lofoten
Søvika	65°56′08″N 12°27′43″E	8800	Alstahaug	Helgeland
Tangstad	68°14′32″N 13°38′46″E	8360	Vestvågøy	Lofoten
Terråk (†)	65°05′13″N 12°22′17″E	7980	Bindal	Helgeland
Tind	67°53′00″N 12°59′40″E	8392	Moskenes	Lofoten
Tjong	66°41′12″N 13°27′06″E	8186	Rødøy	Helgeland
Tjøtta	65°49′22″N 12°25′37″E	8860	Alstahaug	Helgeland
Toft	65°28′07″N 12°08′03″E	8900	Brønnøy	Helgeland
Tonnes	66°30′50″N 13°00′54″E	8750	Lurøy	Helgeland
Torvvær	66°32′38″N 12°09′10″E	8770	Træna	Helgeland
Tosbotn	65°19′35″N 12°57′37″E	8960	Brønnøy	Helgeland
Tranøya	68°11′04″N 15°39′30″E	8297	Hamarøy	Salten
Tro	65°47′25″N 12°31′31″E	8865	Alstahaug	Helgeland
Trofors (†)	65°32′00″N 13°24′22″E	8680	Grane	Helgeland
Trones	66°55′33″N 14°46′30″E	8114	Beiarn	Salten
Trælnes	65°23′16″N 12°10′39″E	8900	Brønnøy	Helgeland
Tuv	67°13′14″N 14°37′07″E	8056	Bodø	Salten
Tverrvika	67°02′33″N 14°34′06″E	8110	Beiarn	Salten
Tverrå	67°18′17″N 15°25′04″E	8200	Fauske	Salten
Tømmerneset	67°53′56″N 15°51′34″E	8260	Hamarøy	Salten
Tårstad	68°27′36″N 16°37′29″E	8535	Evenes	Ofoten
Ulvsvåg (Norwegian); Ulsváhke (Lule Sami)	68°07′10″N 15°53′28″E	8276	Hamarøy	Salten
Unnstad	68°16′02″N 13°35′15″E	8360	Vestvågøy	Lofoten
Utakleiv	68°12′46″N 13°31′16″E	8370	Vestvågøy	Lofoten
Utskarpen	66°17′24″N 13°34′49″E	8725	Rana	Helgeland
Utskor	68°47′52″N 14°38′15″E	8475	Bø	Vesterålen
Valberg	68°11′40″N 13°57′13″E	8370	Vestvågøy	Lofoten
Valla	65°41′23″N 11°52′08″E	8980	Vega	Helgeland
Valnesfjord	67°17′47″N 15°09′51″E	8215	Fauske	Salten
Valvika	67°23′52″N 14°39′11″E	8016	Bodø	Salten
Vandved	66°10′08″N 12°20′26″E	8830	Dønna	Helgeland
Vareid	68°01′21″N 13°09′15″E	8382	Flakstad	Lofoten
Varntresk	65°49′30″N 14°11′53″E	8690	Hattfjelldal	Helgeland
Vassdalsvik	66°48′19″N 13°35′16″E	8170	Meløy	Salten
Vassås	65°05′45″N 12°24′29″E	7980	Bindal	Helgeland
Vennesund	65°12′57″N 12°02′55″E	8920	Sømna	Helgeland
Vestpollen	68°19′43″N 14°41′49″E	8316	Vågan	Lofoten
Vevelstad	65°41′52″N 12°26′13″E	8976	Vevelstad	Helgeland
Vidrek	68°23′25″N 17°08′29″E	8520	Narvik	Ofoten
Vik	68°45′40″N 15°17′16″E	8400	Sortland	Vesterålen
Vik	68°11′59″N 13°33′30″E	8370	Vestvågøy	Lofoten
Vik i Helgeland (†)	65°18′45″N 12°10′02″E	8920	Sømna	Helgeland
Vik i Saltdal	67°07′29″N 15°22′57″E	8250	Saltdal	Salten
Vik i Vesterålen	68°37′06″N 14°52′03″E	8450	Hadsel	Vesterålen
Vikholmen /Vik	66°12′14″N 12°58′11″E	8720	Nesna	Helgeland
Vikten	68°08′25″N 13°18′56″E	8382	Flakstad	Lofoten
Vindstad	67°57′31″N 13°00′11″E	8390	Moskenes	Lofoten
Visthus	65°43′28″N 12°35′48″E	8870	Vevelstad	Helgeland
Våg	66°08′11″N 12°33′19″E	8820	Dønna	Helgeland
Våg	67°07′56″N 14°03′55″E	8130	Gildeskål	Salten
Vågaholmen (Våga) (†)	66°42′49″N 13°17′13″E	8185	Rødøy	Helgeland
Vågehamn /Vestbygda	68°20′50″N 15°30′36″E	8581	Lødingen	Ofoten
Ylvingen	65°38′08″N 12°10′25″E	8985	Vega	Helgeland
Ytre Borgfjord	68°16′13″N 13°47′55″E	8360	Vestvågøy	Lofoten
Ytre Øksningan	66°00′19″N 12°13′41″E	8850	Herøy	Helgeland
Ytre Ånnstad	68°31′43″N 14°41′52″E	8445	Hadsel	Vesterålen
Ytter-Torget	65°25′28″N 12°04′37″E	8900	Brønnøy	Helgeland
Ytteren	66°20′46″N 14°07′48″E	8614	Rana	Helgeland
Ytterstad	68°20′16″N 15°39′40″E	8581	Lødingen	Ofoten
Øresvika	66°27′37″N 13°13′28″E	8752	Rødøy	Helgeland
Ørnes (†)	66°52′08″N 13°42′28″E	8150	Meløy	Salten
Ørsnes	68°11′57″N 14°23′26″E	8310	Vågan	Lofoten
Ørsvåg	68°12′32″N 14°23′29″E	8310	Vågan	Lofoten
Østervika	68°30′07″N 17°04′44″E	8533	Evenes	Ofoten
Øverdal	66°14′37″N 14°02′42″E	8617	Rana	Helgeland
Øvre Kvarv	67°27′48″N 15°33′02″E	8226	Sørfold	Salten
Å på Andøya	69°02′59″N 15°52′40″E	8485	Andøy	Vesterålen
Å i Lofoten	67°52′45″N 12°58′59″E	8392	Moskenes	Lofoten
Åbygda	65°02′52″N 12°30′08″E	7980	Bindal	Helgeland
Ågskardet	66°43′09″N 13°28′14″E	8184	Meløy	Salten
Åker	66°10′15″N 12°34′26″E	8820	Dønna	Helgeland
Åkervika	65°43′07″N 13°56′44″E	8690	Hattfjelldal	Helgeland
Åknes	68°58′34″N 15°25′50″E	8484	Andøy	Vesterålen
Åkvik	65°59′30″N 12°51′03″E	8679	Leirfjord	Helgeland
Ålstad	67°54′54″N 15°10′40″E	8289	Steigen	Salten
Ånstad	68°43′17″N 15°23′29″E	8400	Sortland	Vesterålen
Åse	69°00′56″N 15°48′15″E	8484	Andøy	Vesterålen
Åsmyra	65°41′36″N 12°26′02″E	8976	Vevelstad	Helgeland
