= Sørfjorden =

Sørfjorden or Sørfjord (lit. 'Southern Fjord') may refer to:

== Places ==
=== Norway ===
==== Agder county ====
- Sørfjorden (Aust-Agder), a fjord arm of the Søndeledfjorden in Risør Municipality

==== Finnmark county ====
- Sørfjorden (Gamvik), a fjord arm of the Mehamnfjorden in Gamvik Municipality
- Sørfjorden (Hasvik), a fjord on Stjernøya island in Hasvik Municipality
- Sørfjorden (Lebesby), a fjord arm of the Mårøfjorden in Lebesby Municipality
- Sørfjorden (Loppa), a fjord arm of the Nuvsfjorden in Loppa Municipality

==== Nordland county ====
- Sørfjorden (Bindal), a fjord arm of the Bindalsfjorden in Bindal Municipality
- Sørfjorden (Bodø), a fjord arm of the Mistfjorden in Bodø Municipality
- Sørfjorden (Brønnøy), a fjord arm of the Velfjorden in Brønnøy Municipality
- Sørfjorden (Gildeskål), a fjord arm of the Fugløyfjorden in Gildeskål Municipality
- Sørfjorden (Hemnes), a fjord arm of the Ranfjorden in Hemnes Municipality
- Sørfjorden (Rana), a fjord arm of the Sjona in Rana Municipality
- Sørfjorden (Rødøy), a fjord arm of the Melfjorden in Rødøy Municipality
- Sørfjorden (Sørfold), a fjord arm of the Leirfjorden in Sørfold Municipality
- Sørfjorden (Tysfjord), a fjord arm of the inner Tysfjorden in Narvik Municipality and Hamarøy Municipality
- Sørfjorden (Vefsn), a fjord arm of the Halsfjorden in Vefsn Municipality
- Sørfjorden, Rødøy, a village in Rødøy Municipality
- Sørfjorden Church, a church in Rødøy Municipality
- Sørfjorden Chapel, a church in Gildeskål Municipality

==== Troms county ====
- Sørfjorden (Kvænangen), a fjord arm of the Badderfjord in Kvænangen Municipality
- Sørfjorden (Sortland), a fjord arm of the Hognfjorden in Sortland Municipality
- Sørfjorden (Tromsø), a fjord arm of the Kattfjorden in Tromsø Municipality

==== Trøndelag county ====
- Sørfjorden (Flatanger), a fjord arm of the Svaet in Flatanger Municipality
- Sørfjorden (Nærøysund), a fjord arm of the Fjærangen of Folda in Nærøysund Municipality
- Sørfjorden (Trøndelag), a fjord arm of the Stjørnfjorden in Indre Fosen Municipality
- Sørfjorden, Indre Fosen, a village in Indre Fosen Municipality

==== Vestland county ====
- Sørfjorden (Hardanger), a fjord arm on the large Hardangerfjord
- Sørfjorden (Osterøy), a fjord around the island of Osterøy
