= Halsa =

Halsa may refer to:

== Places ==
- Halsa Municipality, a former municipality in Møre og Romsdal county, Norway
- Halsa, Trøndelag, a village in Heim Municipality in Trøndelag county, Norway
  - Halsa Church, a church in Heim Municipality in Trøndelag county, Norway
- Halsa, Nordland, a village in Meløy Municipality in Nordland county, Norway
  - Halsa Church (Meløy), a church in Meløy Municipality in Nordland county, Norway

== See also ==
- Halsafjorden, a fjord in Møre og Romsdal and Trøndelag, Norway
