= Blokktinden =

Mountain in Nordland, Norway

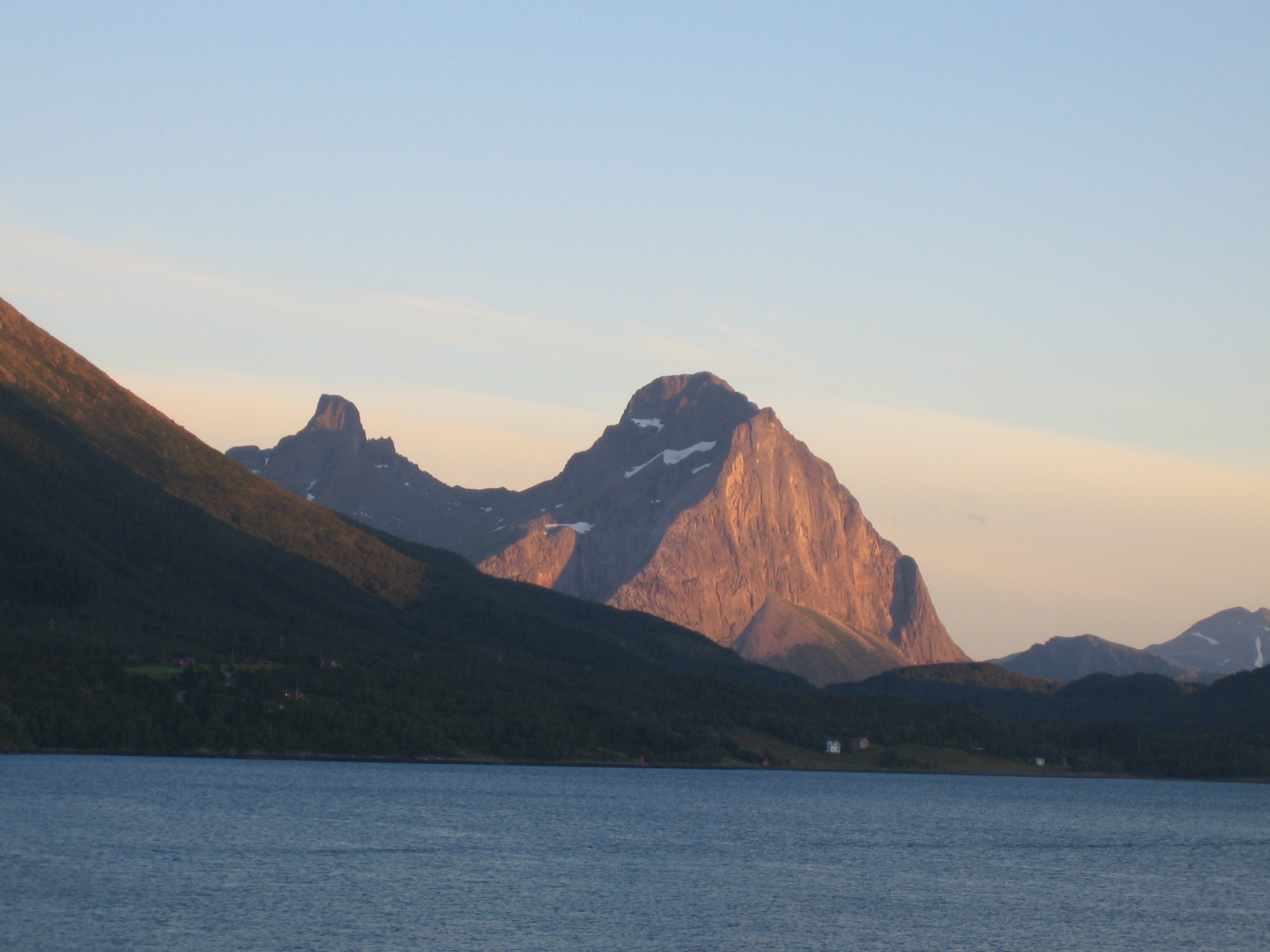
- Blokktinden seen from Halsa in Meløy Municipality

Highest point
- Elevation: 1,032 m (3,386 ft)
- Prominence: 674 m (2,211 ft)
- Coordinates: 66.6522°N 13.4343°E

Geography
- Interactive map of the mountain
- Location: Nordland, Norway
- Parent range: Saltfjellet
- Topo map: 1928 III Melfjorden

Blokktinden is a mountain in Rødøy Municipality in Nordland county, Norway. It is located on the southern side of Tjongsfjorden, across from the village of Tjong. The summit has a good view of the Svartisen glacier and the coastal islands.

== Name ==
The first element is blokk which means "block" in the sense of a "mountain that consists of one single rock". The last element is the finite form of tind which means "mountain peak".
