= Oldervika =

Oldervika may refer to the following locations:

- Oldervika, Rødøy, a village in Rødøy municipality in Nordland county, Norway
- Oldervika, Tjeldsund, a village in Tjeldsund Municipality in Nordland county, Norway

== See also ==
- Oldervik (disambiguation)
