= Alstad (disambiguation) =

Alstad may refer to:

== Places ==
- Alstad, a village in Trelleborg Municipality in Skåne County, Sweden
- Alstad, Norway, a village in Frosta Municipality in Trøndelag county, Norway
- Alstad station, a former railway station in Stjørdal Municipality in Trøndelag county, Norway

== People ==
- Ida Alstad (born 1985), Norwegian handball player
- Jon Olav Alstad (born 1968), Norwegian politician
- Olaf Jarl Alstad (1854–1947), a Norwegian architect

== See also ==
- Ålstad
