= Gjerdøya =

Island in Nordland, Norway

- Interactive map of Gjerdøya

Geography
- Location: Nordland, Norway
- Coordinates: 66.6136°N 12.9907°E
- Area: 9.3 km^{2} (3.6 sq mi)
- Length: 5 km (3.1 mi)
- Width: 2.5 km (1.55 mi)
- Highest elevation: 168 m (551 ft)
- Highest point: Fjellet

Administration
- Norway
- County: Nordland
- Municipality: Rødøy Municipality

Demographics
- Population: 87 (2016)

Gjerdøya is an island in Rødøy Municipality in Nordland county, Norway. It is located in a group of islands located west of the peninsula between the Tjongsfjorden and Melfjorden. It lies south of the island of Rødøya, north of the island of Rangsundøya, and west of the island of Renga. The main village on the island is called Gjerøy. The 9.3-square-kilometre (3.6 sq mi) island has a population (2016) of 87 people. There is regular ferry service to Gjerdøya from the mainland and to the islands surrounding it.

== See also ==
- List of islands of Norway
