= Oldervik =

Oldervik may refer to the following locations:

- Oldervik, Finnmark, a village in Hammerfest Municipality in Finnmark county, Norway
- Oldervik, Lebesby, a village in Lebesby Municipality in Finnmark county, Norway
- Oldervik, Troms, a village in Tromsø Municipality in Troms county, Norway
- Oldervika, Rødøy (sometimes called Oldervik), a village in Rødøy Municipality in Nordland county, Norway

== See also ==
- Oldervika (disambiguation)
