= Tjongsfjorden Church =

Church in Nordland, Norway

- Tjongsfjorden kirke
- Tjongsfjorden Church
- 66.68672981°N 13.43563959°E
- Location: Rødøy Municipality, Nordland
- Country: Norway
- Denomination: Church of Norway
- Churchmanship: Evangelical Lutheran

History
- Status: Parish church
- Founded: 1962
- Consecrated: 1962

Architecture
- Functional status: Active
- Architect: Per Myrvold
- Architectural type: Long church
- Completed: 1962 (64 years ago)

Specifications
- Capacity: 280
- Materials: Wood

Administration
- Diocese: Sør-Hålogaland
- Deanery: Nord-Helgeland prosti
- Parish: Rødøy
- Norwegian Cultural Heritage Site
- Type: Church
- Status: Not protected
- ID: 85634

Tjongsfjorden Church (Norwegian: Tjongsfjorden kirke) is a parish church of the Church of Norway, located in Rødøy Municipality in Nordland county, Norway. It stands in the village of Tjong on the mainland in the northern part of the municipality. It is one of the churches in the Rødøy parish, which is part of the Nord-Helgeland prosti (deanery) in the Diocese of Sør-Hålogaland. The white, wooden church was built in a long church style in 1962, based on plans drawn up by the architect Per Myrvold. The church seats approximately 280 people.

== See also ==
- List of churches in Sør-Hålogaland
