= Rangsundøya =

Island in Nordland, Norway

- Interactive map of Rangsundøya

Geography
- Location: Nordland, Norway
- Coordinates: 66.57223°N 13.03087°E
- Area: 7.6 km^{2} (2.9 sq mi)
- Highest elevation: 267 m (876 ft)
- Highest point: Rangsundtinden

Administration
- Norway
- County: Nordland
- Municipality: Rødøy Municipality

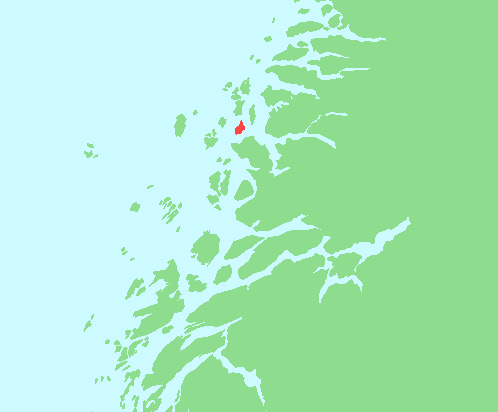
Locator map of Rangsundøya, Nordland, Norway

Rangsundøya is an island in Rødøy Municipality in Nordland county, Norway. The 7.6-square-kilometre (2.9 sq mi) island of Rangsundøya is located off the Helgeland coast in a large group of islands. The island of Gjerdøya lies to the north, Storselsøya lies to the southwest, Renga to the northeast, and the mainland is to the south and east. The highest point on the island is the 267-metre (876 ft) tall mountain Rangsundtinden.

== See also ==
- List of islands of Norway
