= Strauman Church =

- Strauman kirke
- Strauman Church
- 68.28589756°N 14.3472594°E
- Location: Vågan, Nordland
- Country: Norway
- Denomination: Church of Norway
- Churchmanship: Evangelical Lutheran

History
- Former name: Sydal skolekapell
- Status: Chapel
- Founded: 1984

Architecture
- Functional status: Active
- Architectural type: Long church
- Completed: 1984 (42 years ago)

Specifications
- Capacity: 125
- Materials: Wood

Administration
- Diocese: Sør-Hålogaland
- Deanery: Lofoten prosti
- Parish: Gimsøy og Strauman

Strauman Church (Norwegian: Strauman kirke) is a chapel of the Church of Norway in Vågan Municipality in Nordland county, Norway. It is located in the village of Sydalen on the island of Austvågøya. It is an annex chapel in the Gimsøy og Strauman parish which is part of the Lofoten prosti (deanery) in the Diocese of Sør-Hålogaland. The wooden chapel was built in a long church style in 1984. The chapel seats about 125 people.

== History ==
The building was completed in 1984 as a privately owned bedehus (meeting house) called Sydal School Chapel (Norwegian: Sydal skolekapell) before it was later consecrated as a chapel of the Church of Norway. The church is located in the old school in Sydalen.

== See also ==
- List of churches in Sør-Hålogaland
