= Myken Lighthouse =

Coastal lighthouse in Rødøy, Norway

Myken Lighthouse Myken fyrstasjon
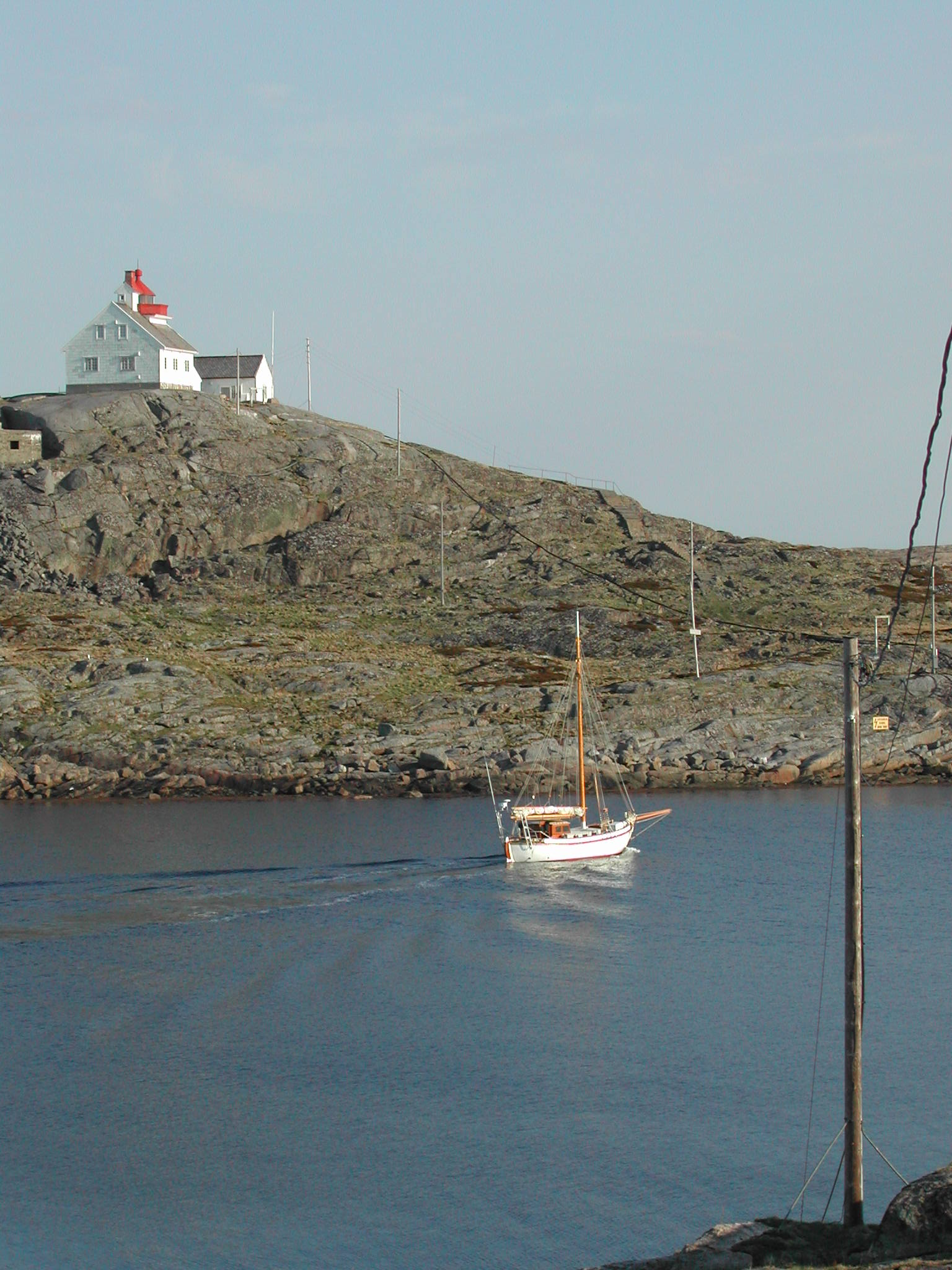
- View of the lighthouse
- Location of the lighthouse
- Location: Nordland, Norway
- Coordinates: 66°45′52″N 12°28′37″E

Tower
- Constructed: 1918
- Construction: wooden
- Automated: 1975
- Height: 12.5 metres (41 ft)
- Markings: white with red top
- Operator: Myken Fyr
- Heritage: cultural heritage preservation in Norway

Light
- Focal height: 40.3 metres (132 ft)
- Intensity: 30,200 candela
- Range: Red: 11.2 nmi (20.7 km; 12.9 mi) Green: 10.7 nmi (19.8 km; 12.3 mi) White: 13.8 nmi (25.6 km; 15.9 mi)
- Characteristic: Oc WRG 6s
- Norway no.: 670000

Myken Lighthouse (Norwegian: Myken fyr) is a coastal lighthouse in Rødøy Municipality in Nordland county, Norway. It is located on the small island of Jutøya in the Myken island group, about 100 kilometres (62 mi) southwest of the town of Bodø.

It was established in 1918 and was automated in 1975. The 30,200-candela light sits on top of a 12.5-metre (41 ft) tall white tower. The occulting light is white, red, or green light depending on direction, occulting once every six seconds. The light can be seen for up to 13.8 nautical miles (25.6 km; 15.9 mi). The light sits at an elevation of 40.3 metres (132 ft) above sea level. The light burns continuously from 1 August until 5 May each year. The light is not on during May through July due to the midnight sun.

== Climate ==
Climate data for Myken 1991-2020 (17 m, extremes 1921-2025 includes earlier station)
| Month | Jan | Feb | Mar | Apr | May | Jun | Jul | Aug | Sep | Oct | Nov | Dec | Year |
|---|---|---|---|---|---|---|---|---|---|---|---|---|---|
| Record high °C (°F) | 10.3 (50.5) | 9.6 (49.3) | 10.1 (50.2) | 18.2 (64.8) | 23.8 (74.8) | 25.3 (77.5) | 27.5 (81.5) | 26.1 (79.0) | 21.1 (70.0) | 17.5 (63.5) | 13.5 (56.3) | 10.2 (50.4) | 27.5 (81.5) |
| Mean daily maximum °C (°F) | 3.5 (38.3) | 2.9 (37.2) | 3.5 (38.3) | 5.7 (42.3) | 8.7 (47.7) | 11.4 (52.5) | 14.3 (57.7) | 14.5 (58.1) | 12.4 (54.3) | 8.7 (47.7) | 6.2 (43.2) | 4.5 (40.1) | 8.0 (46.4) |
| Daily mean °C (°F) | 2.3 (36.1) | 1.6 (34.9) | 2.1 (35.8) | 4.0 (39.2) | 6.9 (44.4) | 9.7 (49.5) | 12.3 (54.1) | 12.8 (55.0) | 10.9 (51.6) | 7.5 (45.5) | 4.9 (40.8) | 3.4 (38.1) | 6.5 (43.7) |
| Mean daily minimum °C (°F) | 0.2 (32.4) | −0.4 (31.3) | 0.3 (32.5) | 2.5 (36.5) | 5.3 (41.5) | 8.3 (46.9) | 11.1 (52.0) | 11.5 (52.7) | 9.5 (49.1) | 5.9 (42.6) | 3.1 (37.6) | 1.4 (34.5) | 4.9 (40.8) |
| Record low °C (°F) | −12.6 (9.3) | −13.9 (7.0) | −12 (10) | −5.8 (21.6) | −2.4 (27.7) | 1 (34) | 6.3 (43.3) | 4.9 (40.8) | −0.1 (31.8) | −4.4 (24.1) | −7.2 (19.0) | −12 (10) | −13.9 (7.0) |
| Average precipitation mm (inches) | 91.9 (3.62) | 70.6 (2.78) | 75.2 (2.96) | 57.2 (2.25) | 49.5 (1.95) | 40.9 (1.61) | 52.8 (2.08) | 66.2 (2.61) | 95.4 (3.76) | 94.5 (3.72) | 98.6 (3.88) | 100.0 (3.94) | 892.8 (35.15) |
| Average precipitation days (≥ 1.0 mm) | 17 | 15 | 15 | 13 | 11 | 10 | 11 | 13 | 17 | 16 | 17 | 18 | 173 |
Source 1: Norwegian Meteorological Institute
Source 2: NOAA

== See also ==
- Lighthouses in Norway
- List of lighthouses in Norway
