= Ågskardet =

Village in Meløy Municipality, Norway

- Village
- Interactive map of Ågskardet
- Location within Nordland Location within Norway
- Coordinates: 66.7193°N 13.4707°E
- Country: Norway
- Region: Northern Norway
- County: Nordland
- District: Salten
- Municipality: Meløy Municipality
- Elevation: 11 m (36 ft)
- Time zone: UTC+01:00 (CET)
  - Summer (DST): UTC+02:00 (CEST)
- Post Code: 8184 Ågskardet
- Climate: Cfc

Ågskardet is a village in Meløy Municipality in Nordland county, Norway. It is located on the southern side of the Holandsfjorden, about 3.5 kilometres (2.2 mi) north of the village of Tjong (in neighboring Rødøy Municipality). There were 127 inhabitants in 2008.

The village lies along Norwegian County Road 17, with a ferry connection to a port, just west of the village of Halsa. The ferry is the only connection to the rest of Meløy Municipality to the north. The village is situated just north of the border with Rødøy Municipality. The village has its own school, chapel/community centre, and some private companies.
