= Rødøy Church =

Church in Nordland, Norway

- Rødøy kirke
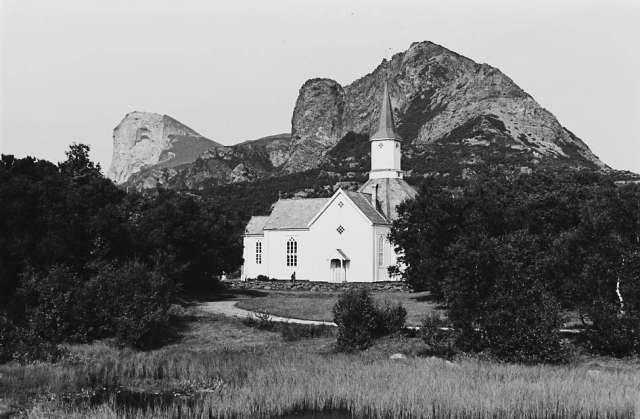
- View of the church circa 1938
- Rødøy Church
- 66.65933253°N 13.07729378°E
- Location: Rødøy Municipality, Nordland
- Country: Norway
- Denomination: Church of Norway
- Churchmanship: Evangelical Lutheran

History
- Status: Parish church
- Founded: 14th century
- Consecrated: 1885
- Events: 2009 fire

Architecture
- Functional status: Active
- Architect: Andreas Grenstad
- Architectural type: Octagonal
- Completed: 1885 (141 years ago)

Specifications
- Capacity: 700
- Materials: Wood

Administration
- Diocese: Sør-Hålogaland
- Deanery: Nord-Helgeland prosti
- Parish: Rødøy
- Norwegian Cultural Heritage Site
- Type: Church
- Status: Listed
- ID: 85334

Rødøy Church (Norwegian: Rødøy kirke) is a parish church of the Church of Norway in Rødøy Municipality in Nordland county, Norway. It is located on the island of Rødøya. It is one of the churches in the Rødøy parish which is part of the Nord-Helgeland prosti (deanery) in the Diocese of Sør-Hålogaland. The white, wooden church was built in an octagonal style in 1885 using plans drawn up by the architect Andreas Grenstad. The church seats about 700 people.

== History ==
The earliest existing historical records of the church date back to the year 1432, but the church was not built that year. The first church here was located about 150 metres (490 ft) north of the present site of the church (an alternate site where there may be evidence of this first church is about 350 metres (1,150 ft) north of the present church site). The first church was likely a stave church that was built in the 14th century. During the 17th century, records show that the church was in need of replacing one of the large stave posts. In 1725, the old medieval building was torn down and a new church was built on the same site. The new building was a small wooden church with a low roof line and no tower. It had a cruciform design and later a tower was constructed on the roof.

In 1814, this church served as an election church (Norwegian: valgkirke). Together with more than 300 other parish churches across Norway, it was a polling station for elections to the 1814 Norwegian Constituent Assembly which wrote the Constitution of Norway. This was Norway's first national elections. Each church parish was a constituency that elected people called "electors" who later met together in each county to elect the representatives for the assembly that was to meet at Eidsvoll Manor later that year.

In 1885, a new church was constructed at a site about 150 metres (490 ft) south of the old church on the present church site. This new church was built in an octagonal design. After construction was complete, the old church was torn down. The church had a fire in 2009 after a lightning strike.

== See also ==
- List of churches in Sør-Hålogaland
