= Rødøya =

Island in Nordland, Norway

Rødøya Rødøy
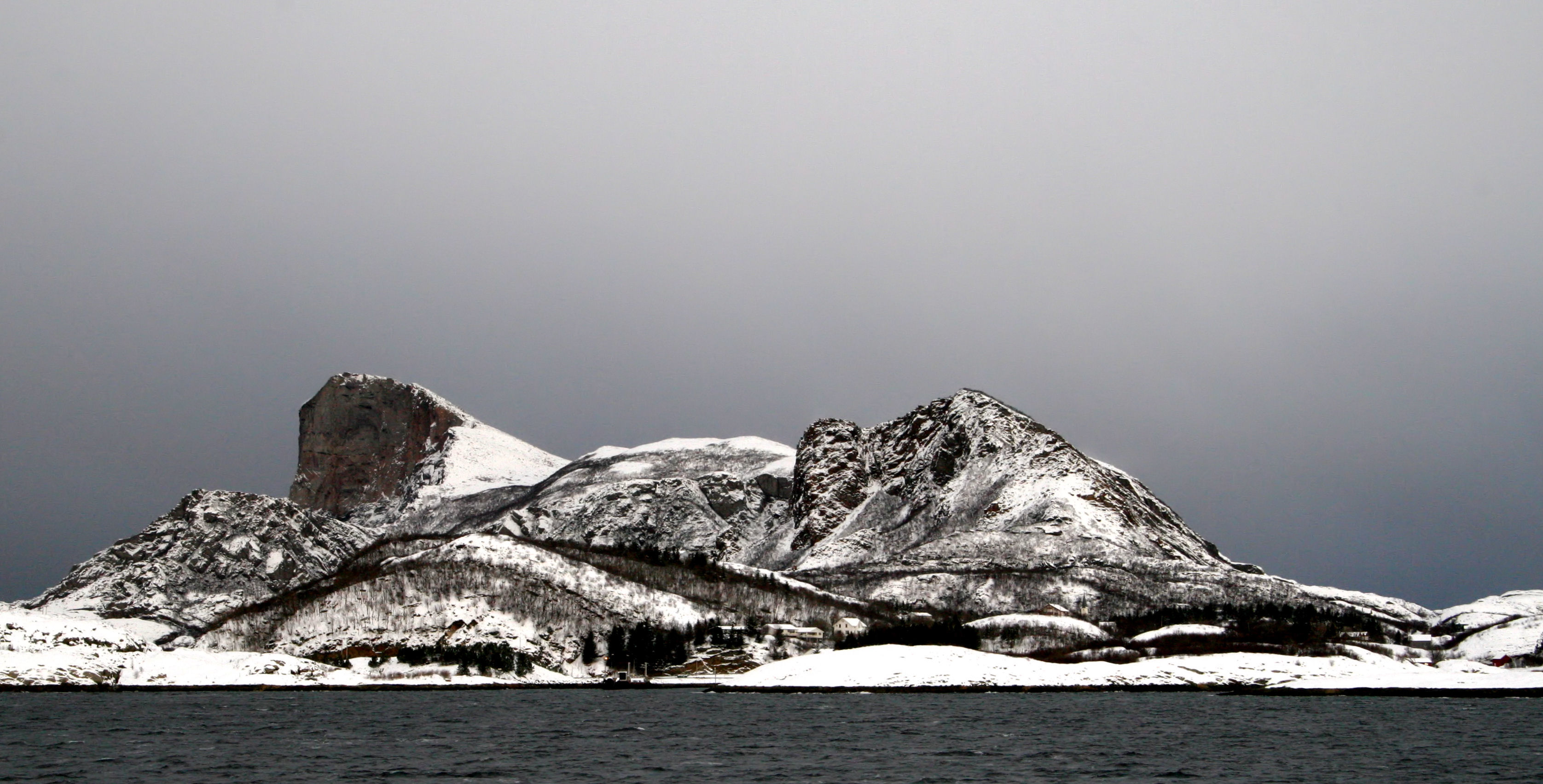
- Interactive map of Rødøya; Rødøy

Geography
- Location: Nordland, Norway
- Coordinates: 66.6866°N 13.0769°E
- Area: 8.2 km^{2} (3.2 sq mi)
- Length: 5.2 km (3.23 mi)
- Width: 2.5 km (1.55 mi)
- Highest elevation: 443 m (1453 ft)
- Highest point: Rødøyløva

Administration
- Norway
- County: Nordland
- Municipality: Rødøy Municipality

Demographics
- Population: 150 (2017)

Rødøya is an island in Rødøy Municipality in Nordland county, Norway. The 8.5-square-kilometre (3.3 sq mi) island is located just west of the mouth of the Tjongsfjorden, north of the island of Gjerdøya, and west of the mainland. There are ferry connections from the village of Rødøy to the village of Jektvika on the mainland and to the nearby island of Gjerdøya. Rødøy Church is located in the village of Rødøy on the south side of the island. The island had 150 residents in 2017.

== See also ==
- List of islands of Norway
