= Melfjorden =

Fjord in Rødøy, Norway

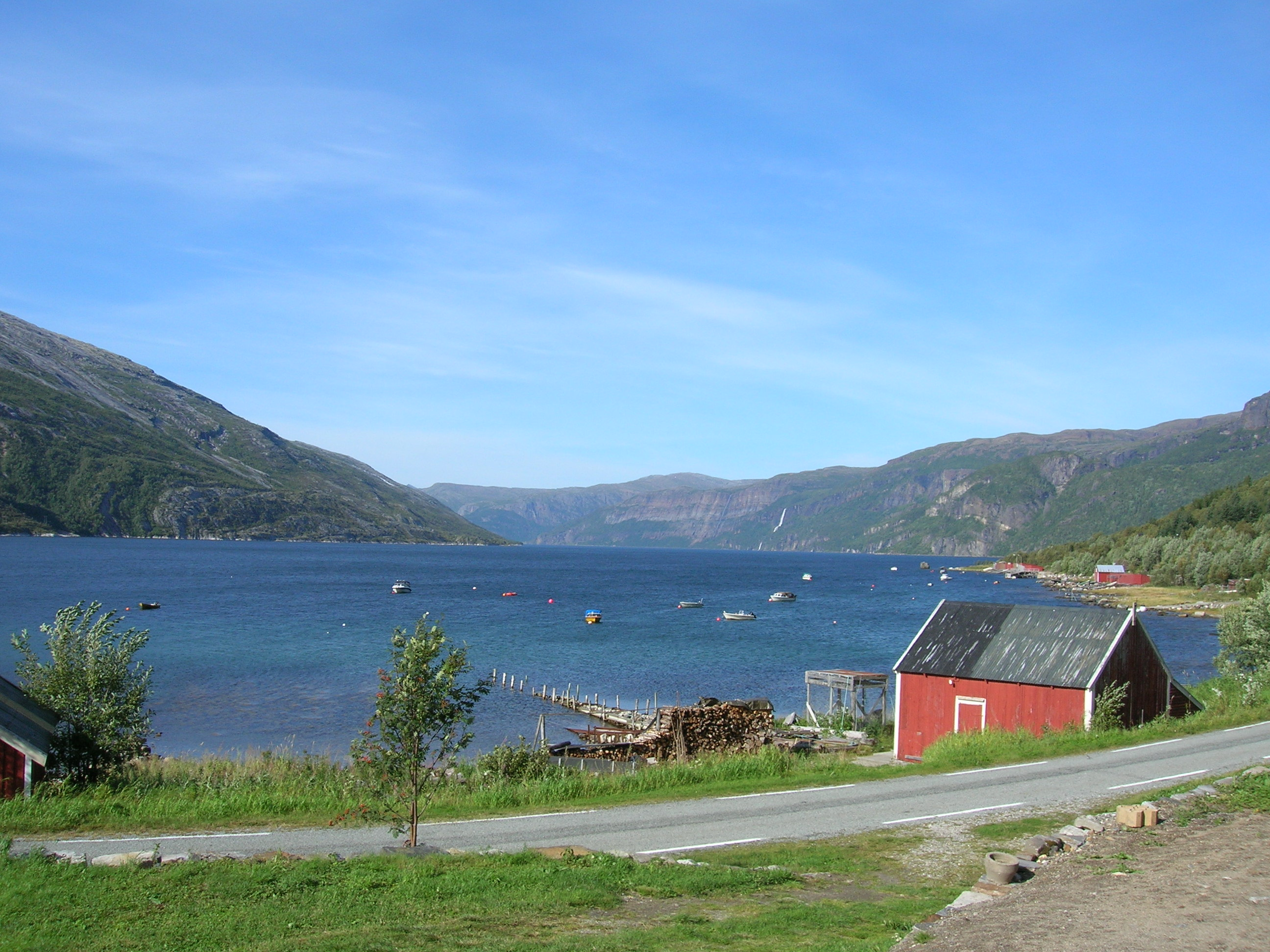
- View of the fjord from Melfjordbotn village
- Interactive map of the fjord
- Location: Nordland county, Norway
- Coordinates: 66.5556°N 13.5068°E
- Type: Fjord
- Basin countries: Norway
- Max. length: 33 kilometres (21 mi)
- Settlements: Melfjordbotn

Melfjorden is a fjord in Rødøy Municipality in Nordland county, Norway. It is located on the Arctic Circle. The 33-kilometre (21 mi) long fjord goes from the village of Melfjordbotn in the east to its mouth in the Rødøyfjorden near the island of Rangsundøya. There are two fjord arms that branch off the main fjord: Nordfjorden flows to the north into the Saltfjellet–Svartisen National Park and Sørfjorden to the south past the villages of Sørfjorden and Kilboghavn.

The village of Melfjordbotn lies at the eastern end of the fjord in Rødøy Municipality, but it is only accessible by road through neighboring Rana Municipality.

== See also ==
- List of Norwegian fjords
