= Jarstad =

Village in Hadsel Municipality, Norway

Jarstad: Jarstad (Norwegian); Járstáđik (Northern Sami); Gjerstad (historic spelling)
- Village
- Interactive map of Jarstad
- Location within Nordland Location within Norway
- Coordinates: 68.6156°N 15.1558°E
- Country: Norway
- Region: Northern Norway
- County: Nordland
- District: Vesterålen
- Municipality: Hadsel Municipality
- Elevation: 19 m (62 ft)
- Time zone: UTC+01:00 (CET)
  - Summer (DST): UTC+02:00 (CEST)
- Post Code: 8450 Stokmarknes

Jarstad (Norwegian) or Járstáđik (Northern Sami) is a village in Hadsel Municipality in Nordland county, Norway. The village is located on the island of Langøya on the northern shore of the Hadselfjorden, just south of the border with Sortland Municipality. It is located approximately half-way between the towns of Stokmarknes and Sortland, and just north of the village of Grytting.
