= Sydalen =

Village in Vågan Municipality, Norway

- Village
- Interactive map of Sydalen
- Location within Nordland Location within Norway
- Coordinates: 68.2872°N 14.3387°E
- Country: Norway
- Region: Northern Norway
- County: Nordland
- District: Lofoten
- Municipality: Vågan Municipality
- Elevation: 17 m (56 ft)
- Time zone: UTC+01:00 (CET)
  - Summer (DST): UTC+02:00 (CEST)
- Post Code: 8313 Kleppstad

Sydalen is a village in Vågan Municipality in Nordland county, Norway. It is located on the west coast of the island of Austvågøya, about 7 kilometres (4.3 mi) north of the Gimsøystraumen Bridge on the European route E10 highway. The village of Gravermarka lies about 2 kilometres (1.2 mi) north of Sydalen. Strauman Church is located in Sydalen.
