= Tjongsfjorden =

Fjord in Rødøy, Norway

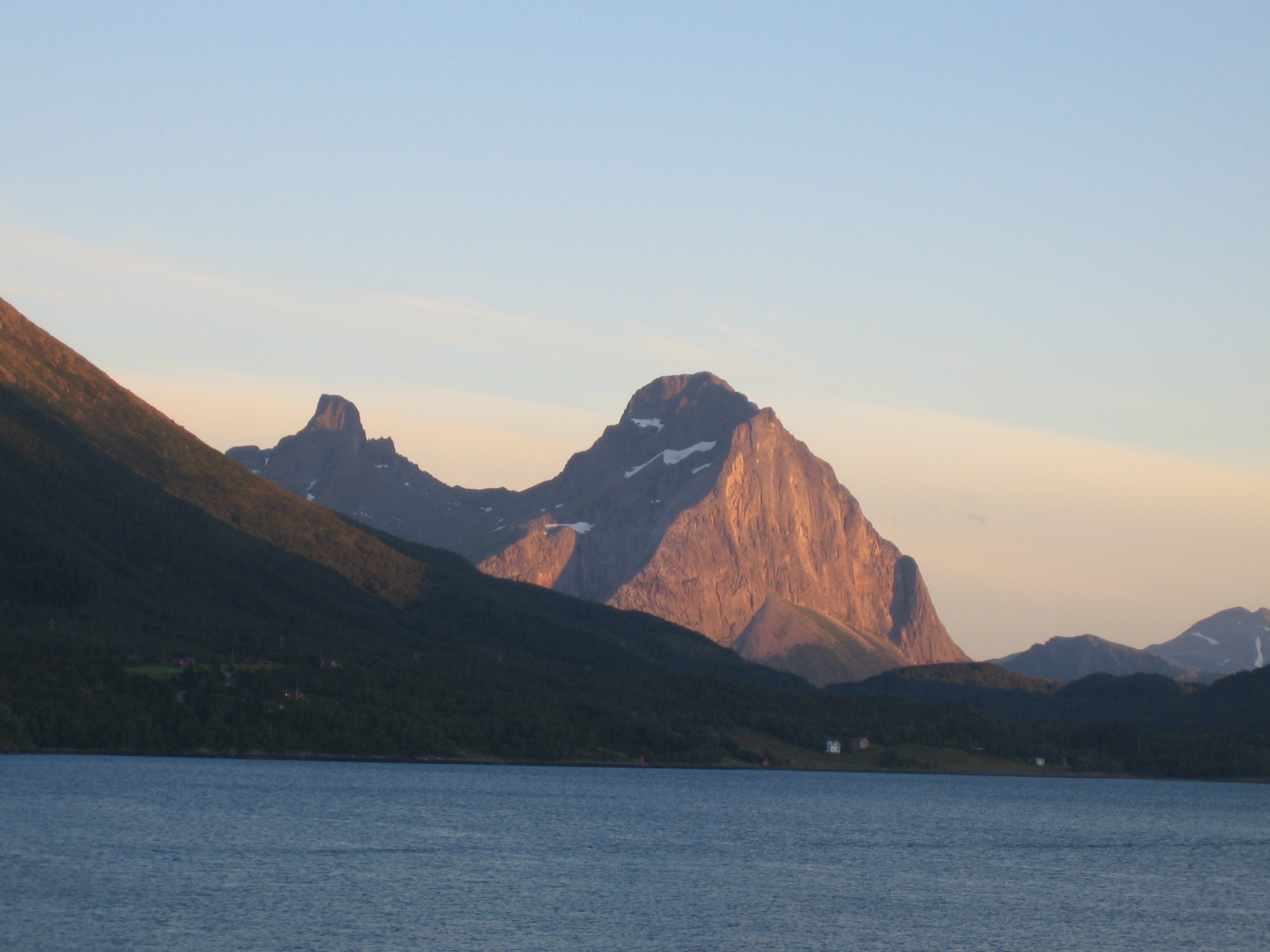
- View of the fjord and Blokktinden mountain
- Interactive map of the fjord
- Location: Nordland county, Norway
- Coordinates: 66.6815°N 13.3597°E
- Type: Fjord
- Basin countries: Norway
- Max. length: 17 kilometres (11 mi)

Tjongsfjorden is a fjord in Rødøy Municipality in Nordland county, Norway. The 17-kilometre (11 mi) long fjord begins just west of the Svartisen glacier; it flows west and flows into the Rødøyfjorden, which is just east of the island of Rødøya. The mountain, Blokktinden, lies on the southern shore. The village, Tjong and Vågaholmen, lie along the northern shore. Norwegian County Road 17, running across Nordland and Trøndelag counties, runs along the inner part of the fjord.

== See also ==
- List of Norwegian fjords
