= Grytting =

Village in Hadsel Municipality, Norway

Grytting: Grytting (Norwegian); Grivttegak (Northern Sami)
- Village
- Interactive map of Grytting
- Location within Nordland Location within Norway
- Coordinates: 68.6099°N 15.1177°E
- Country: Norway
- Region: Northern Norway
- County: Nordland
- District: Vesterålen
- Municipality: Hadsel Municipality
- Elevation: 5 m (16 ft)
- Time zone: UTC+01:00 (CET)
  - Summer (DST): UTC+02:00 (CEST)
- Post Code: 8450 Stokmarknes

Grytting (Norwegian) or Grivttegak (Northern Sami) is a village in Hadsel Municipality in Nordland county, Norway. The village is located on the island of Langøya on the northern shore of the Hadselfjorden. It is located approximately half-way between the towns of Stokmarknes and Sortland; just south of the village of Jarstad.

Most of the inhabitants in Grytting are employed in either agriculture or the fishing industry. Elbjørg has a home bakery there, and her bread is known locally to be one of the best in that area. A horse centre (Grytting Hestesenter og hovslager) is located there as well, just across the road of Elbjørg's home bakery.

Cross country skiing and ski jumping are common sports. The community maintains two ski jump hills and a 3.5-kilometre (2.2 mi) long prepared cross country skiing track. A local school served children here until 1989, but it was closed and is now used as a kindergarten.

In the Viking Age there was a large settlement here, with only some ruins left today. A local guide is needed to see the ruins since it is quite hidden. The only things to be seen are some old Viking graves around the Lunnan area.

The area was inhabited early due to a lagoon, perfect for boats in bad weather. Wildlife includes fresh water fish (trout, salmon), sea fish (cod, coalfish, crustacean), grouse, and moose. It is an attractive area for fishing and hunting.
