= Melfjordbotn =

Village in Rødøy Municipality, Norway

Melfjordbotn Melfjorden
- Village
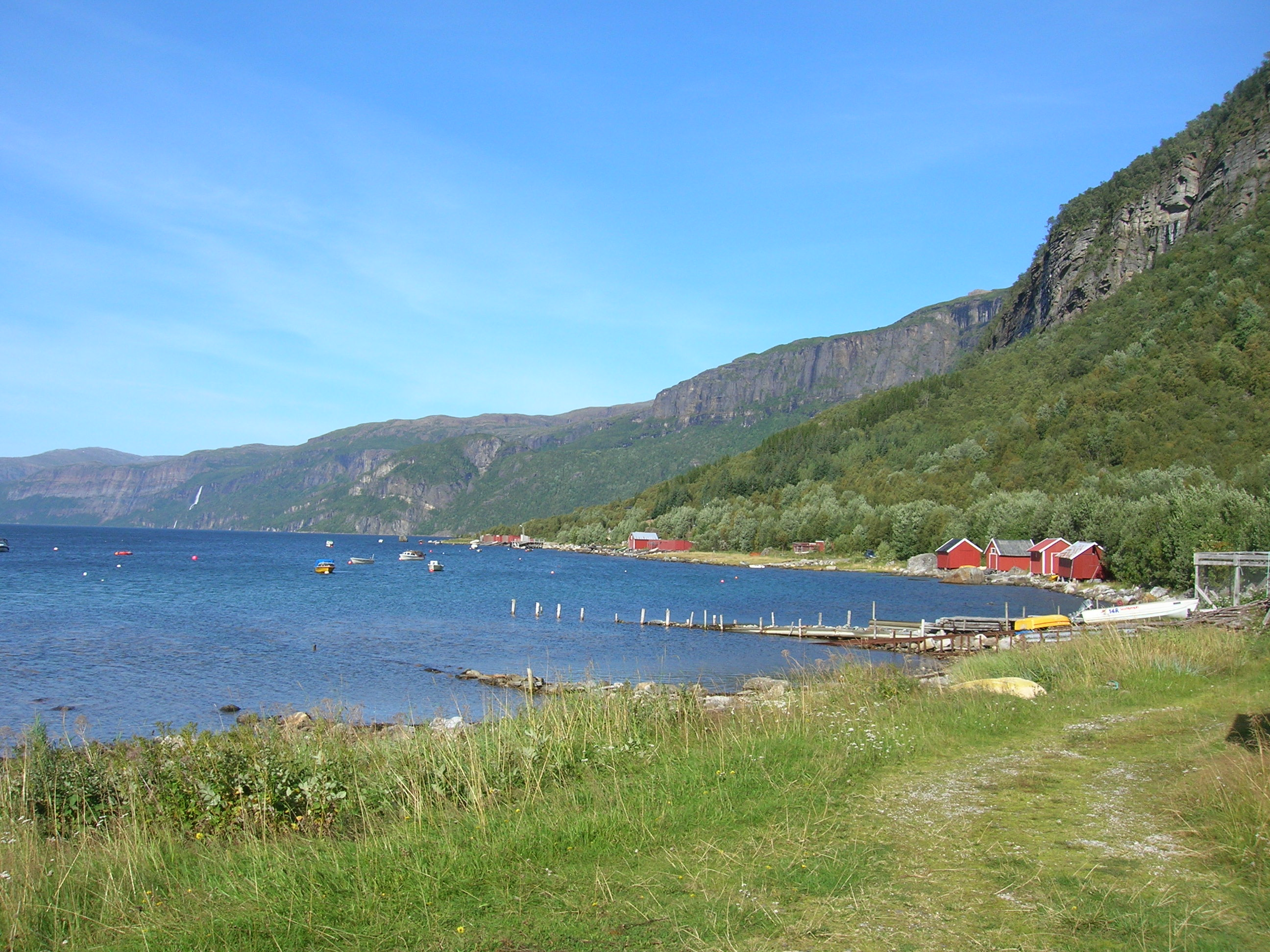
- View of the fishing houses along the fjord in Melfjordbotn
- Interactive map of Melfjordbotn; Melfjorden
- Location within Nordland Location within Norway
- Coordinates: 66.5154°N 13.6767°E
- Country: Norway
- Region: Northern Norway
- County: Nordland
- District: Helgeland
- Municipality: Rødøy Municipality
- Elevation: 21 m (69 ft)
- Time zone: UTC+01:00 (CET)
  - Summer (DST): UTC+02:00 (CEST)
- Post Code: 8182 Melfjordbotn

Melfjordbotn or Melfjorden is a village in Rødøy Municipality in Nordland county, Norway. The village is located at the eastern end of the Melfjorden, southwest of the Svartisen glacier. The Saltfjellet–Svartisen National Park lies about 7 kilometres (4.3 mi) north of the village.

The village is fairly remote, with only one road leading in and out of the village, the Norwegian County Road 355, which was built in 1982. The road is a steep mountain road with many hairpin turns that doesn't connect it to the rest of Rødøy, but instead connects it to the neighboring Rana Municipality. The road is often closed during the winter.
