= Ålstad =

Village in Nordland, Norway

- Location in Nordland Ålstad (Norway)
- Coordinates: 67°54′54″N 15°10′33″E
- Country: Norway
- Region: Northern Norway
- County: Nordland
- District: Salten
- Municipality: Steigen

Ålstad is a village in Steigen, Nordland, Norway. It is located on the island of Engeløya.

== See also ==
- List of villages in Nordland
