= Eggum =

Surname list

Eggum is a surname. Notable people with the surname include:

- Arne Eggum (born 1936), Norwegian historian
- Jan Eggum (born 1951), Norwegian singer and songwriter
- Jørn Eggum (born 1972), Norwegian trade unionist
- Knut Eggum Johansen (born 1943), Norwegian civil servant
