= Vågaholmen =

Village in Rødøy Municipality, Norway

Vågaholmen Våga
- Village
- Interactive map of Vågaholmen
- Location within Nordland Location within Norway
- Coordinates: 66.7136°N 13.2875°E
- Country: Norway
- Region: Northern Norway
- County: Nordland
- District: Helgeland
- Municipality: Rødøy Municipality
- Elevation: 4 m (13 ft)
- Time zone: UTC+01:00 (CET)
  - Summer (DST): UTC+02:00 (CEST)
- Post Code: 8185 Vågaholmen

Vågaholmen (sometimes shortened to Våga) is the administrative centre of Rødøy Municipality in Nordland county, Norway. The village is located along the Tjongsfjorden, just west of the village of Tjong.
