= Sørfjorden Church =

Church in Nordland, Norway

- Sørfjorden kirke
- Sørfjorden Church
- 66.49130771°N 13.29274490°E
- Location: Rødøy Municipality, Nordland
- Country: Norway
- Denomination: Church of Norway
- Churchmanship: Evangelical Lutheran

History
- Status: Parish church
- Founded: 1916
- Consecrated: July 1916

Architecture
- Functional status: Active
- Architect: O.M. Olsen
- Architectural type: Long church
- Completed: 1916 (110 years ago)

Specifications
- Capacity: 130
- Materials: Wood

Administration
- Diocese: Sør-Hålogaland
- Deanery: Nord-Helgeland prosti
- Parish: Rødøy
- Norwegian Cultural Heritage Site
- Type: Church
- Status: Not protected
- ID: 85049

Sørfjorden Church (Norwegian: Sørfjorden kirke) is a parish church of the Church of Norway in Rødøy Municipality in Nordland county, Norway. It is located in the village of Sørfjorden on the mainland in the southern part of the municipality. It is one of the churches in the Rødøy parish which is part of the Nord-Helgeland prosti (deanery) in the Diocese of Sør-Hålogaland. The white, wooden church was built in a long church style in 1916 using plans drawn up by the architect O.M. Olsen. The church seats about 130 people.

== See also ==
- List of churches in Sør-Hålogaland
