= Nesøya, Nordland =

Island in Nordland, Norway

Nesøya
- Interactive map of Nesøya

Geography
- Location: Nordland, Norway
- Coordinates: 66.5862°N 12.6764°E
- Area: 14.5 km^{2} (5.6 sq mi)
- Length: 6.6 km (4.1 mi)
- Width: 3.3 km (2.05 mi)
- Highest elevation: 254 m (833 ft)
- Highest point: Nordfjellet

Administration
- Norway
- County: Nordland
- Municipalities: Rødøy Municipality and Lurøy Municipality

Demographics
- Population: 126 (2016)

Nesøya is an island in Nordland county, Norway. The 14.5-square-kilometre (5.6 sq mi) island is located on the border of Rødøy Municipality and Lurøy Municipality. It lies to the west of the island Storselsøya. The 254-metre (833 ft) tall Nordfjellet mountain is the highest point on the island. The Arctic Circle passes just south of the island. In 2016, there were 126 residents living on the island, which is only accessible by boat.

== See also ==
- List of islands of Norway
