= Austbø =

Austbø is a Norwegian surname. Notable people with the surname include:

- Edvin Austbø (born 2005), Norwegian footballer
- Fredrik Austbø (born 1988), Norwegian snowboarder
- Håkon Austbø (born 1948), Norwegian pianist
- Iven Austbø (born 1985), Norwegian footballer
- Johan Austbø (1879–1945), Norwegian teacher
