= Gravermarka =

Village in Vågan Municipality, Norway

Gravermarka Gravermark
- Village
- Interactive map of Gravermarka
- Location within Nordland Location within Norway
- Coordinates: 68.2997°N 14.3199°E
- Country: Norway
- Region: Northern Norway
- County: Nordland
- District: Lofoten
- Municipality: Vågan Municipality
- Elevation: 12 m (39 ft)
- Time zone: UTC+01:00 (CET)
  - Summer (DST): UTC+02:00 (CEST)
- Post Code: 8313 Kleppstad

Gravermarka is a small village in Vågan Municipality in Nordland county, Norway. It is located on the western side of the island of Austvågøya in the Lofoten archipelago. The village of Sydalen lies about 1.5 kilometres (0.93 mi) southeast of the village.

Gravermarka has a population of about 60 inhabitants. The village has been a documented settlement since the 1600s, but it probably goes back to the Viking Age. Three Viking graves have been found in the village. There are two farms and a local shop in the village. There has been plans to restore the local fishery that has been out of business for 20 years for some sort of industry. The majority of the population work in the nearby town of Svolvær.

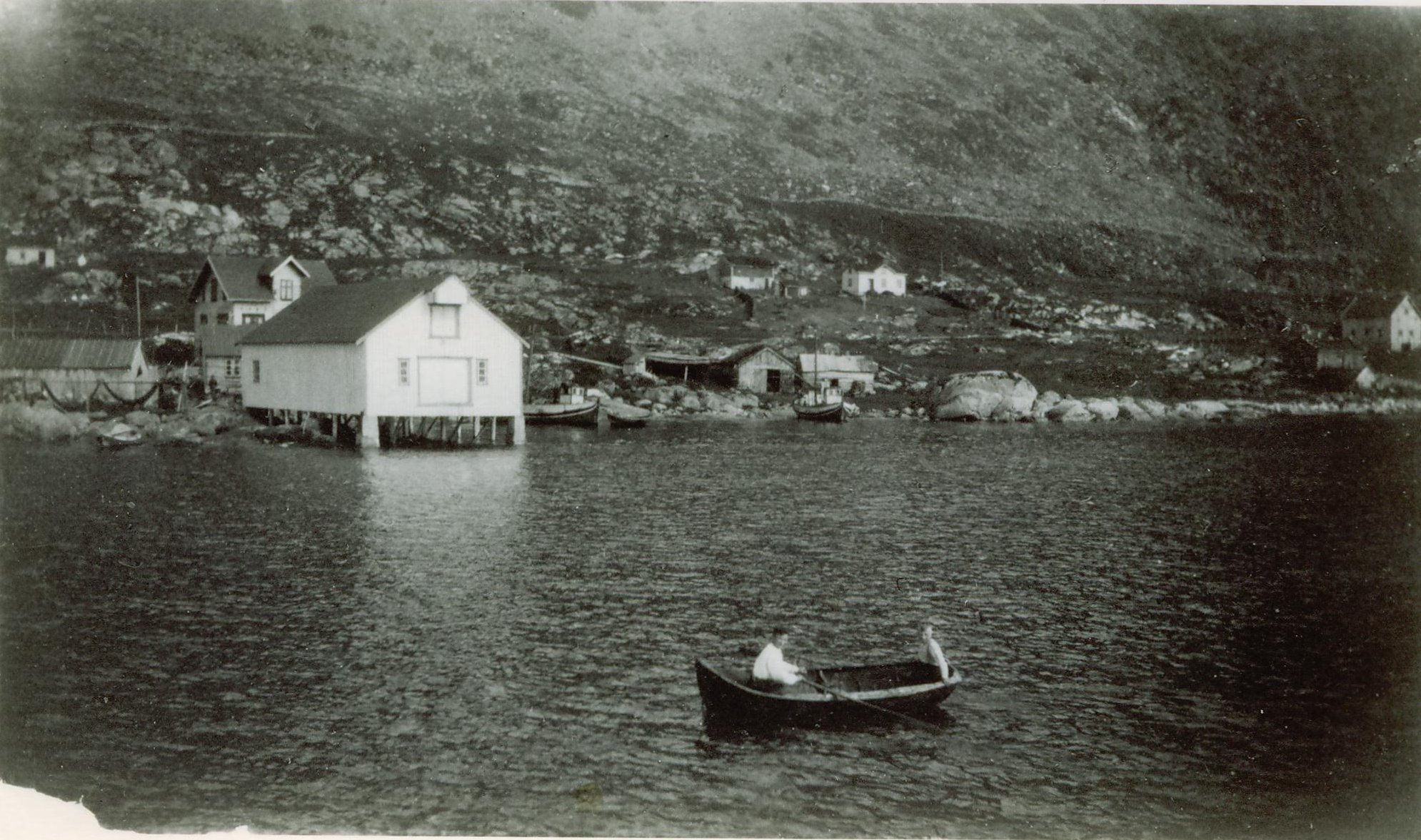
Gravermarka in 1938: Photo of the local shop

== Population ==
Year	1865	1900	2008	2010
Population	40	55	51	60

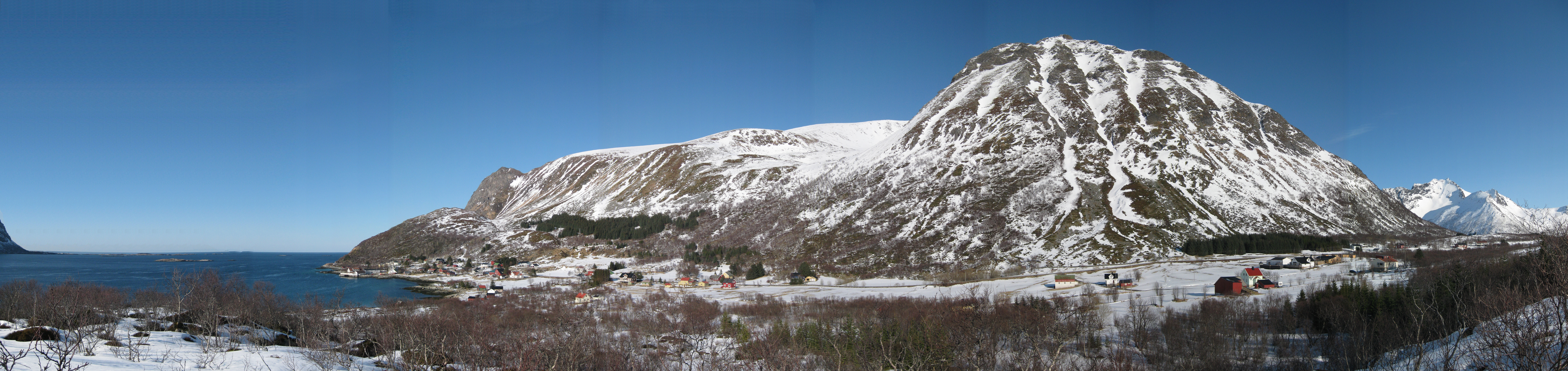
Gravermarka seen from «Nøkkåsen» in Easter of 2009. Photo: Jørn Sund-Henriksen
