= Halsa Church (Meløy) =

Church in Nordland, Norway

- Halsa kirke
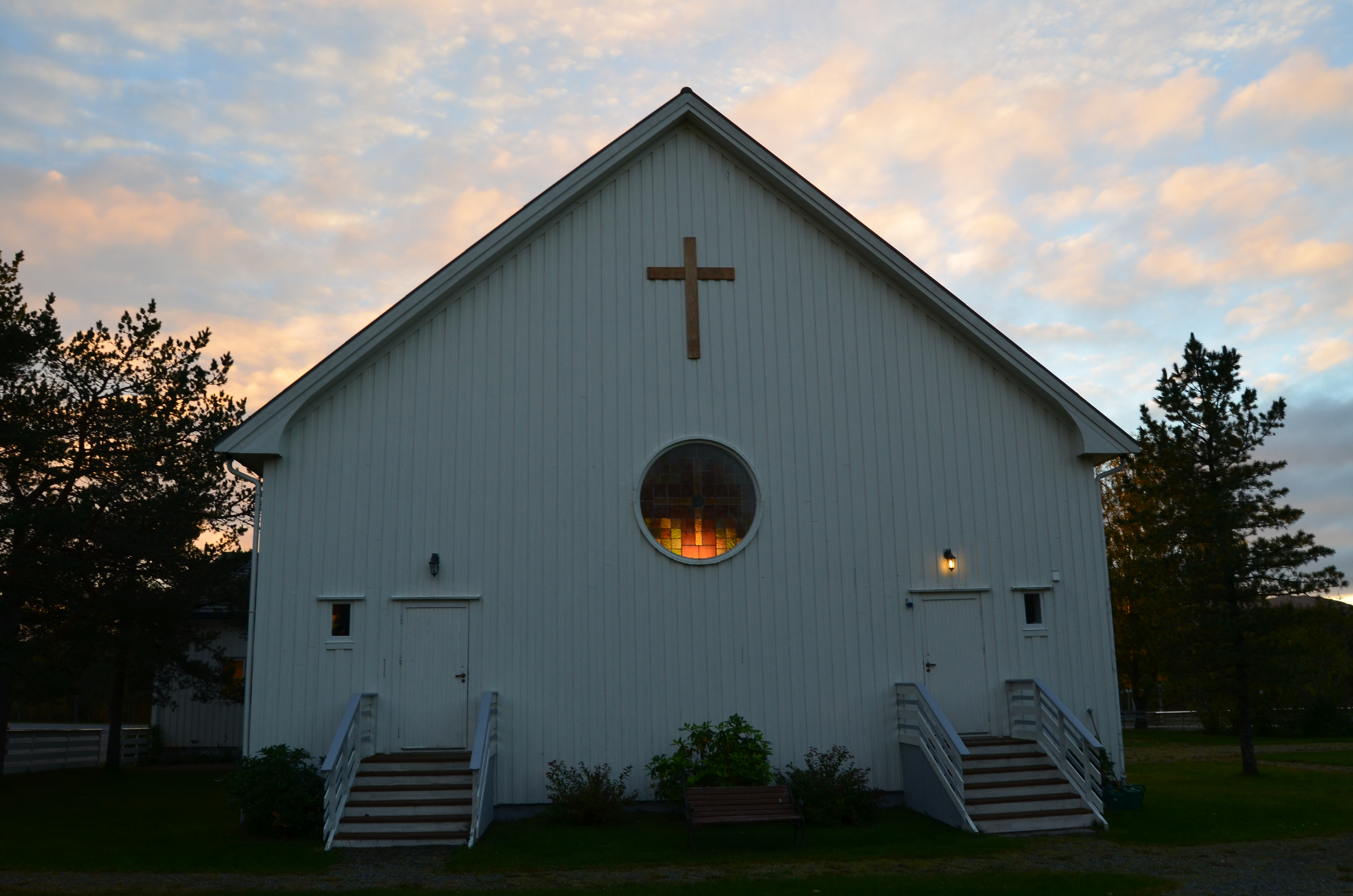
- View of the church
- Halsa Church
- 66.7436862°N 13.5769869°E
- Location: Meløy Municipality, Nordland
- Country: Norway
- Denomination: Church of Norway
- Churchmanship: Evangelical Lutheran

History
- Status: Parish church
- Founded: 1960
- Consecrated: 22 May 1960

Architecture
- Functional status: Active
- Architect: Kirsten Wleügel Knutssøn
- Architectural type: Long church
- Completed: 1960 (66 years ago)

Specifications
- Capacity: 400
- Materials: Wood

Administration
- Diocese: Sør-Hålogaland
- Deanery: Bodø domprosti
- Parish: Halsa
- Norwegian Cultural Heritage Site
- Type: Church
- Status: Not protected
- ID: 84467

Halsa Church (Norwegian: Halsa kirke) is a parish church of the Church of Norway in Meløy Municipality in Nordland county, Norway. It is located in the village of Halsa. It is the church for the Halsa parish which is part of the Bodø domprosti (deanery) in the Diocese of Sør-Hålogaland. The white, wooden church was built in a long church style in 1960 using plans drawn up by the architect Kirsten Wleügel Knutssøn. The church seats about 400 people. The building was consecrated on 22 May 1960 by the Bishop Hans Edvard Wisløff.

== See also ==
- List of churches in Sør-Hålogaland
