= Tjong, Nordland =

Village in Rødøy Municipality, Norway

Tjong Tjongsfjord
- Village
- Interactive map of Tjong
- Location within Nordland Location within Norway
- Coordinates: 66.6856°N 13.4504°E
- Country: Norway
- Region: Northern Norway
- County: Nordland
- District: Helgeland
- Municipality: Rødøy Municipality
- Elevation: 14 m (46 ft)
- Time zone: UTC+01:00 (CET)
  - Summer (DST): UTC+02:00 (CEST)
- Post Code: 8186 Tjongsfjorden

Tjong is a village in Rødøy Municipality in Nordland county, Norway. The village is located along the Tjongsfjorden, east of the municipal center of Vågaholmen. The local church, Tjongsfjorden Church, serves all of northeastern Rødøy. The village of Ågskardet in neighboring Meløy Municipality lies about 3.5 kilometres (2.2 mi) to the north.
