= Storselsøya =

Island in Nordland, Norway

Storselsøya Selsøya Hestmona
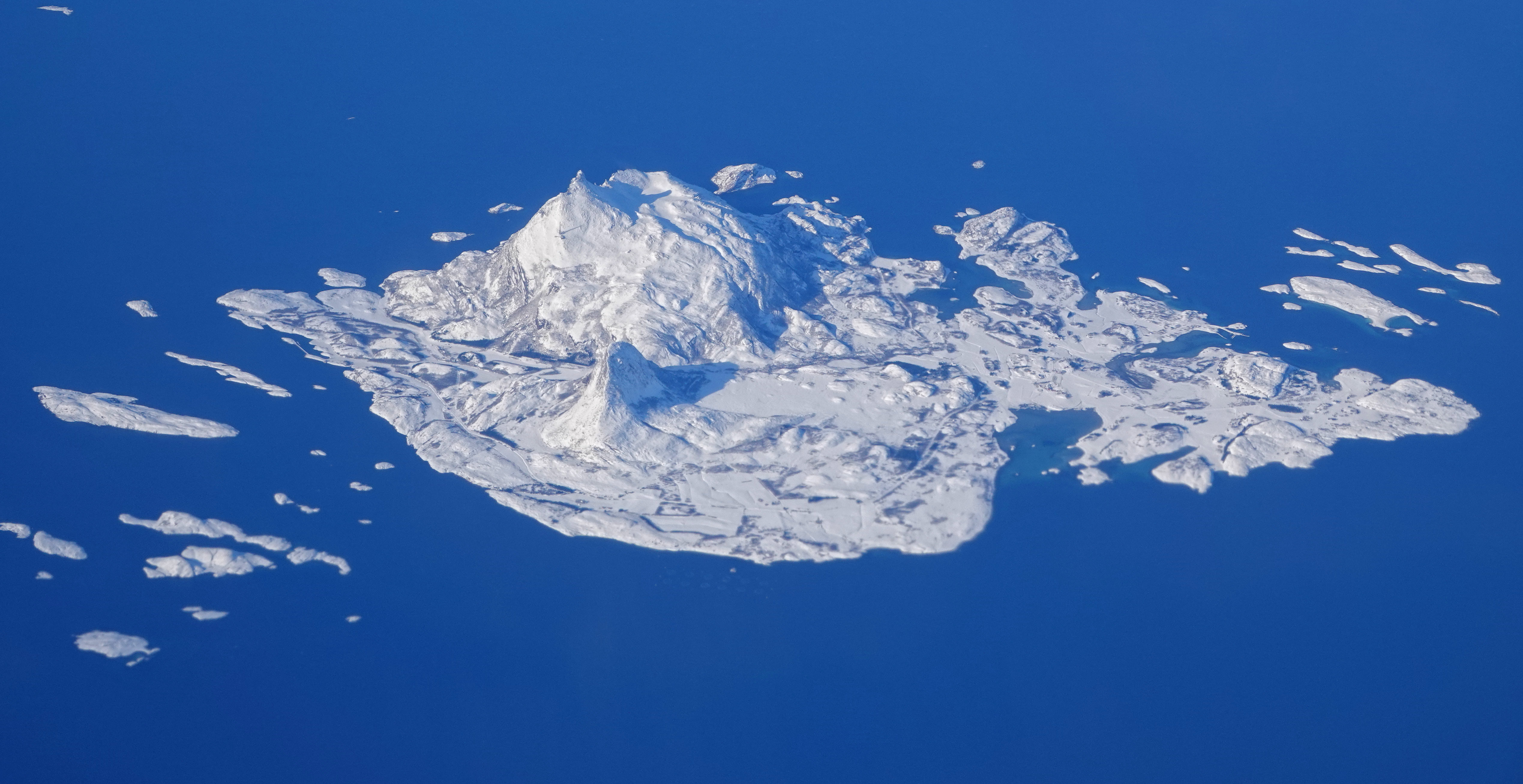
- Aerial photo from north-east
- Interactive map of Storselsøya; Selsøya; Hestmona

Geography
- Location: Nordland, Norway
- Coordinates: 66.5308°N 12.8494°E
- Area: 13.6 km^{2} (5.3 sq mi)
- Length: 6 km (3.7 mi)
- Width: 4 km (2.5 mi)
- Highest elevation: 571 m (1873 ft)
- Highest point: Hestmonkallen

Administration
- Norway
- County: Nordland
- Municipalities: Rødøy Municipality and Lurøy Municipality

Demographics
- Population: 35 (2017)

Storselsøya (also known as Selsøya or Hestmona) is an island in Nordland county, Norway. The island is divided between two municipalities: Rødøy Municipality in the north and Lurøy Municipality in the south. The island of Nesøya lies to the west, the island of Lurøya lies to the south, and the mainland village of Tonnes lies to the east.

The northern and eastern parts of the 13.6-square-kilometre (5.3 sq mi) island are flat and marshy. The Arctic Circle crosses the northern part of the island. There are ferry connections to the surrounding islands and to the mainland at Jektvika. The 571-metre (1,873 ft) tall mountain Hestmonkallen is located in the southwest.

== Name ==
The name of the island has varied over time and not all have agreed on the name. In 2014, the appeal board for the Norwegian Language Council made a final decision on the name of the island. They decided that the main name of the island would be Storselsøya and that name would also refer to the northern part of the island in Rødøy Municipality. Hestmona would be an official name that refers to the southern part of the island. The board also approved Selsøya as an alternate name. A minority on the appeal board wanted Hestmannøy to refer to the southern part in Lurøy Municipality, but that was not approved. Historically, the island was known as Hestmona because of the main mountain on the island was known as Hestmonkallen.

== See also ==
- List of islands of Norway
