= Sørfjorden, Rødøy =

Village in Rødøy Municipality, Norway

Sørfjorden
- Village
- Interactive map of Sørfjorden
- Location within Nordland Location within Norway
- Coordinates: 66°28′37″N 13°15′28″E
- Country: Norway
- Region: Northern Norway
- County: Nordland
- District: Helgeland
- Municipality: Rødøy Municipality
- Elevation: 0.5 m (1.6 ft)
- Time zone: UTC+01:00 (CET)
  - Summer (DST): UTC+02:00 (CEST)
- Post Code: 8190 Sørfjorden

Sørfjorden is a village in Rødøy Municipality in Nordland county, Norway. The village is located on the eastern shore of the Sørfjorden, just south of Oldervika. It is the location of Sørfjorden Church. There is no road connection to the rest of Norway, even though it is located on the mainland. The only access is by ferry to Kilboghamn and Jektvika.
