= Halsa, Nordland =

Village in Meløy Municipality, Norway

Halsa
- Village
- Interactive map of Halsa
- Location within Nordland Location within Norway
- Coordinates: 66.7432°N 13.5537°E
- Country: Norway
- Region: Northern Norway
- County: Nordland
- District: Salten
- Municipality: Meløy Municipality
- Elevation: 7 m (23 ft)
- Time zone: UTC+01:00 (CET)
  - Summer (DST): UTC+02:00 (CEST)
- Post Code: 8178 Halsa

Halsa is a village in Meløy Municipality in Nordland county, Norway. The village is located along Norwegian County Road 17, across the fjord from the village of Ågskardet. Halsa Church is located in this village, serving the southern part of Meløy Municipality.
