= Oldervika, Rødøy =

Village in Rødøy Municipality, Norway

Oldervika Oldervik
- Village
- Interactive map of Oldervika
- Location within Nordland Location within Norway
- Coordinates: 66.5066°N 13.3108°E
- Country: Norway
- Region: Northern Norway
- County: Nordland
- District: Helgeland
- Municipality: Rødøy Municipality
- Elevation: 9 m (30 ft)
- Time zone: UTC+01:00 (CET)
  - Summer (DST): UTC+02:00 (CEST)
- Post Code: 8190 Sørfjorden

Oldervika is a village in Rødøy Municipality in Nordland county, Norway. The village is located on the eastern shore of the Sørfjorden, just north of the village of Sørfjorden. Although it is located on the mainland, there are no road connections to the rest of Norway. It has a ferry connection to Kilboghamn to the west and Jektvika to the north.
