= Rødøy Municipality =

Municipality in Nordland, Norway

Rødøy Municipality Rødøy kommune Rávddá (Ume Sami)
- Municipality
- Rødø herred (historic name)
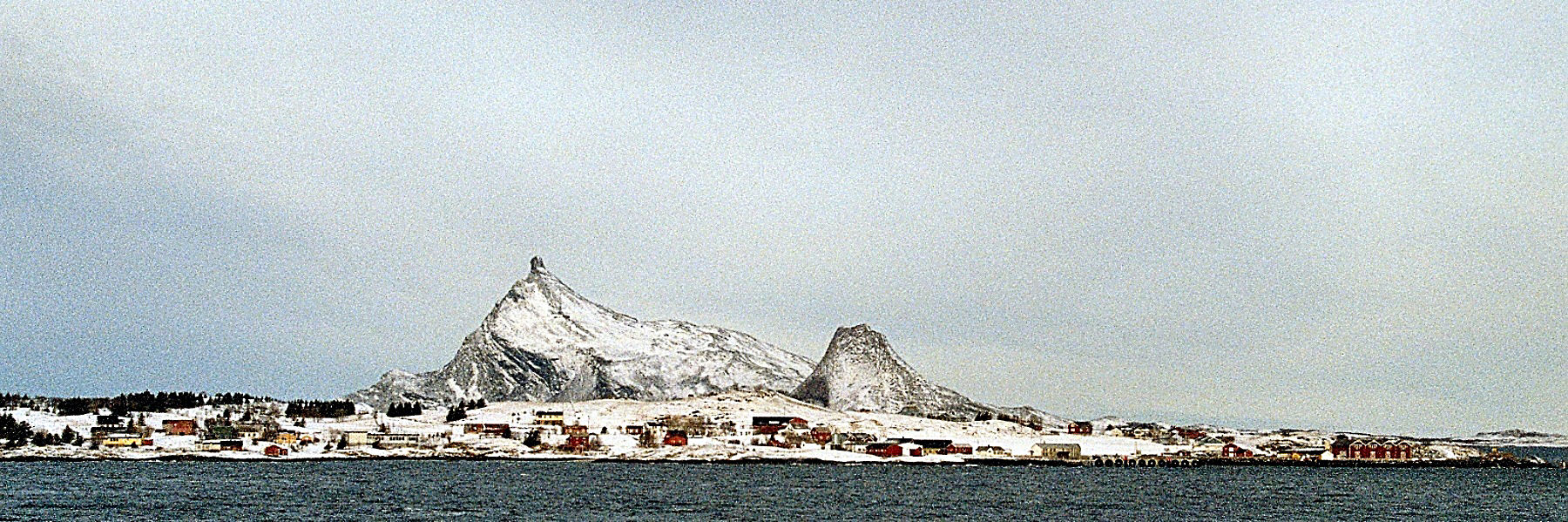
- View of the island of Hestmona

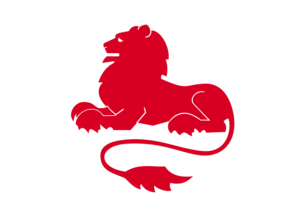
- Flag Coat of arms

- Nordland within Norway

- Rødøy within Nordland
- Coordinates: 66°35′36″N 13°21′34″E
- Country: Norway
- County: Nordland
- District: Helgeland
- Established: 1 Jan 1838
  - Created as: Formannskapsdistrikt
- Administrative centre: Vågaholmen

Government
  - Mayor (2019): Inger Dagmar Monsen (Ap)

Area
  - Total: 711.29 km^{2} (274.63 sq mi)
  - Land: 685.94 km^{2} (264.84 sq mi)
  - Water: 25.35 km^{2} (9.79 sq mi) 3.6%
  - Rank: #162 in Norway
- Highest elevation: 1,533.62 m (5,031.6 ft)

Population (2024)
  - Total: 1,139
  - Rank: #325 in Norway
  - Density: 1.6/km^{2} (4.1/sq mi)
  - Change (10 years): ▼ −12.7%
- Demonym: Rødøyfjerding

Official language
  - Norwegian form: Neutral
- Time zone: UTC+01:00 (CET)
  - Summer (DST): UTC+02:00 (CEST)
- ISO 3166 code: NO-1836
- Website: Official website

Rødøy is a municipality in Nordland county, Norway. It is part of the Helgeland traditional region. The administrative centre of the municipality is the village of Vågaholmen. Other villages include Gjerøy, Jektvika, Kilboghamn, Melfjordbotn, Oldervika, Sørfjorden, and Tjong. The municipality consists of many islands to the west of Norway's second biggest glacier, Svartisen.

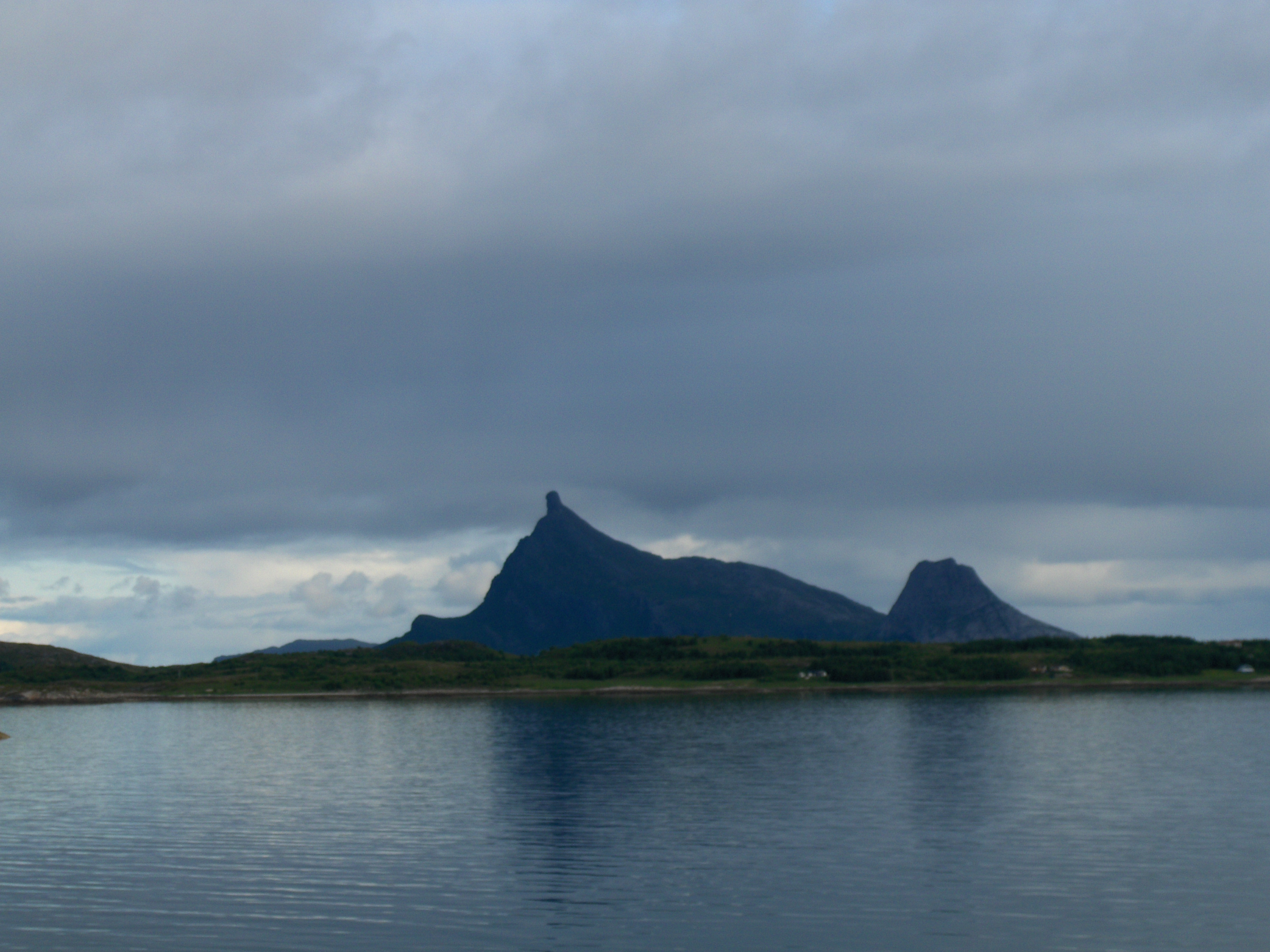
Hestmona

The 711-square-kilometre (275 sq mi) municipality is the 162nd largest by area out of the 357 municipalities in Norway. Rødøy Municipality is the 325th most populous municipality in Norway with a population of 1,139. The municipality's population density is 1.6 inhabitants per square kilometre (4.1/sq mi) and its population has decreased by 12.7% over the previous 10-year period.

== General information ==
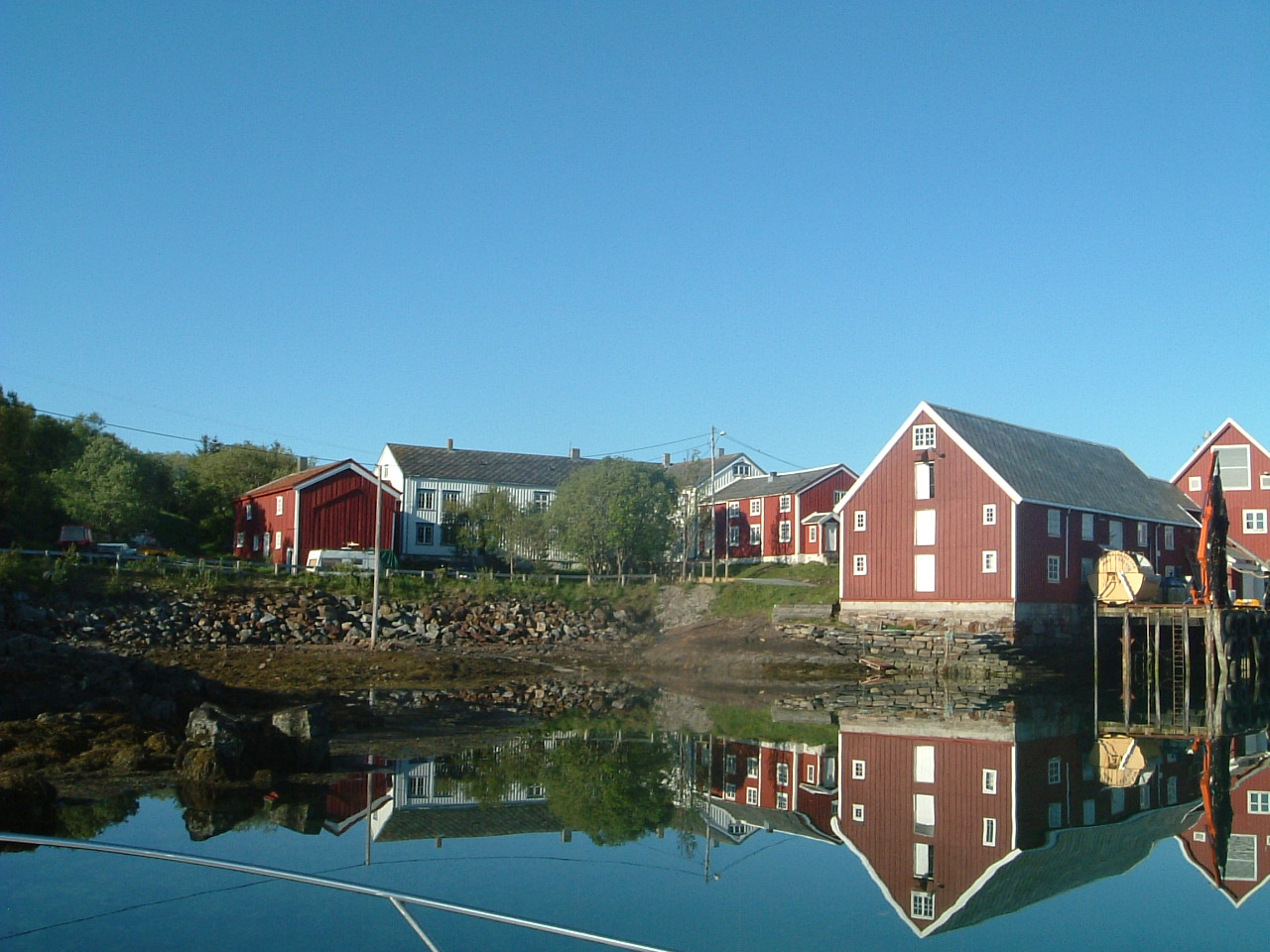
Selsøyvik, in earlier days a stopover for fishing boats from Trøndelag going to Lofoten

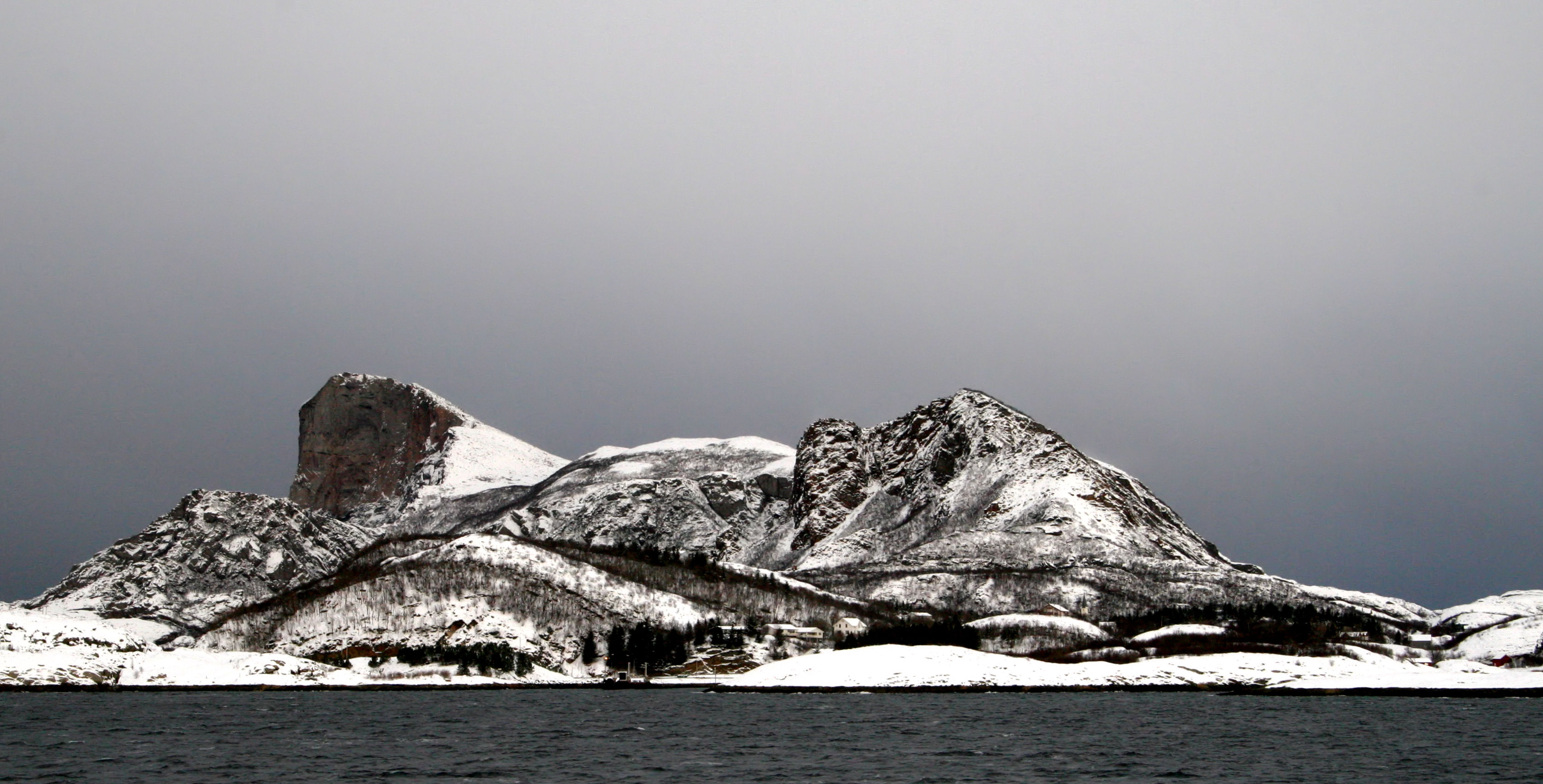
Rødøyløva ('Rødøy Lion'), the basis of the municipal arms.

The municipality of Rødøy was established on 1 January 1838 (see formannskapsdistrikt law). On 1 January 1884, the northern district of Rødøy was separated to form the new Meløy Municipality. This division left Rødøy with 1,945 residents. The borders of the municipality have not changed since that time.

=== Name ===
The municipality (originally the parish) is named after the island of Rødøya (Old Norse: Rauðøy) since the first Rødøy Church was built there. The first element is rauðr which means "red" (probably referring to the color of the rocks of the island). The last element is øy which means "island". Historically, the name of the municipality was spelled Rødø. On 6 January 1908, a royal resolution changed the spelling of the name of the municipality to Rødøy.

=== Coat of arms ===
The coat of arms was granted on 12 February 1988. The official blazon is "Argent, a lion couchant gules" (Norwegian: I sølv en liggende rød løve). This means the arms have a field (background) that has a tincture of argent which means it is commonly colored white, but if it is made out of metal, then silver is used. The charge is red-colored lion that is laying down with its head up and its tail dangling down. The arms are somewhat canting because the municipal name means "Red Island", so the color red was chosen for the lion. The most striking formation on the island is a large, rocky mountain, which has a striking resemblance to a lion. The mountain's name is Rødøyløva, meaning "the Lion of Red Island", which is why this was chosen for the municipal arms. The silver background symbolizes the sea. The arms were designed by Olga Grimsmo Nilsen, former teacher in a local school.

=== Churches ===
The Church of Norway has two parishes (sokn) within Rødøy Municipality. It is part of the Nord-Helgeland prosti (deanery) in the Diocese of Sør-Hålogaland.

Churches in Rødøy Municipality
Parish (sokn)	Church name	Location of the church	Year built
Rødøy	Rødøy Church	Rødøya	1885
Rødøy indre	Sørfjorden Church	Sørfjorden	1916
Rødøy indre	Tjongsfjorden Church	Tjong	1962

== Geography ==
The eastern part of Rødøy Municipality is located on the mainland, just west of the Saltfjellet mountain range. The rest of the municipality consists of islands to the west including Gjerdøya, Storselsøya, Myken, Nesøya, Rangsundøya, Renga, and Rødøya. The westernmost part of the municipality is the Myken islands in the Vestfjorden, where the Myken Lighthouse is located.

The Tjongsfjorden is located in the northern part of the mainland of Rødøy, just north of the mountain Blokktinden. The Melfjorden is located in the southern part of the mainland, flowing out of the Saltfjellet–Svartisen National Park. The highest point in the municipality is the 1,533.62-metre (5,031.6 ft) tall mountain Steintinden.

=== Climate ===
The Norwegian Meteorological Institute has a weather station near the Myken Lighthouse on an island west in the Norwegian Sea. Myken is situated 32 kilometres (20 mi) from the mainland and 25 kilometres (16 mi) north of the Arctic Circle. This is one of the most oceanic stations in Northern Norway. The current station has recording since 1992, and an earlier station at same location was in operation 1920–1991. The all-time high temperature is 27.5 °C (81.5 °F) recorded July 1972; the all-time low is −13.9 °C (7.0 °F) recorded in February 1966. The driest month on record is September 2015 with 0.0 millimetres (0 in) precipitation, and the wettest is October 1934 with 227 millimetres (8.9 in). The average date for first overnight freeze (below 0 °C (32 °F)) in autumn is November 10 (1981-2010 average) at Myken.

Climate data for Myken 1991-2020 (17 m, extremes 1921-2025 includes earlier station)
Month	Jan	Feb	Mar	Apr	May	Jun	Jul	Aug	Sep	Oct	Nov	Dec	Year
Record high °C (°F)	10.3 (50.5)	9.6 (49.3)	10.1 (50.2)	18.2 (64.8)	23.8 (74.8)	25.3 (77.5)	27.5 (81.5)	26.1 (79.0)	21.1 (70.0)	17.5 (63.5)	13.5 (56.3)	10.2 (50.4)	27.5 (81.5)
Mean daily maximum °C (°F)	3.5 (38.3)	2.9 (37.2)	3.5 (38.3)	5.7 (42.3)	8.7 (47.7)	11.4 (52.5)	14.3 (57.7)	14.5 (58.1)	12.4 (54.3)	8.7 (47.7)	6.2 (43.2)	4.5 (40.1)	8.0 (46.4)
Daily mean °C (°F)	2.3 (36.1)	1.6 (34.9)	2.1 (35.8)	4.0 (39.2)	6.9 (44.4)	9.7 (49.5)	12.3 (54.1)	12.8 (55.0)	10.9 (51.6)	7.5 (45.5)	4.9 (40.8)	3.4 (38.1)	6.5 (43.7)
Mean daily minimum °C (°F)	0.2 (32.4)	−0.4 (31.3)	0.3 (32.5)	2.5 (36.5)	5.3 (41.5)	8.3 (46.9)	11.1 (52.0)	11.5 (52.7)	9.5 (49.1)	5.9 (42.6)	3.1 (37.6)	1.4 (34.5)	4.9 (40.8)
Record low °C (°F)	−12.6 (9.3)	−13.9 (7.0)	−12 (10)	−5.8 (21.6)	−2.4 (27.7)	1 (34)	6.3 (43.3)	4.9 (40.8)	−0.1 (31.8)	−4.4 (24.1)	−7.2 (19.0)	−12 (10)	−13.9 (7.0)
Average precipitation mm (inches)	91.9 (3.62)	70.6 (2.78)	75.2 (2.96)	57.2 (2.25)	49.5 (1.95)	40.9 (1.61)	52.8 (2.08)	66.2 (2.61)	95.4 (3.76)	94.5 (3.72)	98.6 (3.88)	100.0 (3.94)	892.8 (35.15)
Average precipitation days (≥ 1.0 mm)	17	15	15	13	11	10	11	13	17	16	17	18	173
Source 1: Norwegian Meteorological Institute
Source 2: NOAA

=== Farms of Rødøy ===
Historically, the land of Rødøy was divided up into named farms. These farms were used in census and tax records and are useful for genalogical research. These are the farm names in Rødøy as they are listed in O. Rygh's series "Norske Gaardnavne" ("Norwegian Farm Names"), the Nordland volume of which was published in 1905.

See also: Digital version of Norske Gaardnavne - Nordland (in Norwegian)

The farm numbers are used in some census records, and numbers that are near each other indicate that those farms are geographically proximate. Handwritten Norwegian sources, particularly those prior to 1800, may use variants on these names. For recorded variants before 1723, see the digital version of O. Rygh.

Farm names were often used as part of Norwegian names, in addition to the person's given name and patronymic or inherited surname. Some families retained the farm name, or toponymic, as a surname when they emigrated, so in those cases tracing a surname may tell you specifically where in Norway the family was from. This tradition began to change in the mid to late 19th century, and inherited surnames were codified into law in 1923.

==== Farm maps ====
Note that each map has a maximum number of listings it can display, so the map has been divided into parts consistent with the enumeration districts (Norwegian: tellingskrets) in the 1920 census. This map will include one farm name per farm number; other farm names or subdivision numbers may exist.
Coordinates are approximate.

Rødøy municipality, tellingskrets 1-6 from 1920 census
Tellingskrets (enumeration districts): 1 Nordnæsøy - Storselsøy (lime); 2 Sundøy - Molvik (black); 3, Stensland - Skivik (blue); 4, Skogan - Aspvik - Vaatvik - Hammerheivik (purple); 5, Hyttan - Nordfjordholm (green); 6, Telnes - Esjeholm (red). List of farms:
1 1: Nesøy nordre
2 2: Selsøy
3 3: Sundøy
4 4: Selsøyvik
5 5: Rangsund
6 6: Håkaringen
7 7: Gjersvik
8 8: Laugnes
9 9: Steinsland
10 10: Kilboghavn
11 11: Øresvik
12 12: Tømmerdal
13 13: Sørfjorden
14 14: Vasvik
15 15: Gjervalvatnet
16 16: Kvalvik
17 17: Skeivik
18 18: Strand
19 19: Oldervik
20 20: Hellervik
21 21: Aspvik
22 28: Vaatvik
23 29: Hammerhei
24 22: Hyttan
25 23: Sandvik
26 24: Kilhavn
27 25: Melfjorden
28 26: Nordfjordnes
29 27: Nordfjordholm
30 30: Telnes
31 31: Einvik
32 32: Sperstad
33 33: Sjaavik
34 34: Jægtvik
35 35: Forsdal
36 36: Aanes (Ånes)
37 37: Kvitnesvik
38 38: Mælen
39 39: Strømdal (Strømsnes)
40 40: Kisten
41 41: Strømsvik
42 42: Eidvik
43 43: Væranger
44 44: Lauknes
45 45: Esjeholmen
46 Sørfjorden church (built 1916)
Rødøy municipality, tellingskrets 7-12 from 1920 census
Tellingskrets (enumeration districts): 7, Værnesos - Kvalvik (lime); 8, Blok - Tryggestad (Tjongsfjorden) (black); 9, Vaageng - Tølløk - Svinværø (blue); 10, Myken - Valvær (red); 11, Rødøy - Gjæsø - Flatø (green); 12, Gjærø - Ringen (purple). List of farms:
1 46: Værnesos
2 47: Sørværnes
3 48: Rønvik
4 49: Bø Kvalvik
5 50: Værnes nordre
6 51: Kvalvik
7 74: Rødø Vasdal
8 52: Blok
9 53: Bjuga
10 54: Klubben
11 55: Reppen
12 56: Fjeldmo
13 57: Breivik
14 58: Aarnes (Årnes)
15 59: Tjong nedre
16 60: Melkvik
17 61: Kila
18 62: Engstad
19 63: Seglfor
20 64: Vaagenga
21 65: Vaaga
22 66: Sleipnes
23 67: Seines
24 68: Tølløken
25 69: Svinvær
26 70: Otervær
27 71: Myken
28 72: Gjesøy
29 73: Høivåg
30 74: Rødøy
31 75: Flatøy
32 76: Sandvik
33 77: Gjerøy søndre
34 78: Gjerøyhavn
35 79: Ringen ytre
36 80: Ringen indre
37 Rødøy church (built 1885)
38 Tjongsfjorden church (built 1962)

==== Farm names and numbers ====
The following table is taken from O. Rygh's work, and has inconsistencies with the 1920 census.

If you can't find an entry when you are searching for a word that starts with AE, Ae, O, A or Aa, it may have been transcribed from one of those letters not used in English. Try looking for it under the Norwegian letter; Æ, Ø, and Å appear at the end of the Norwegian alphabet.

Farm Name	Farm Number
Nesøen nordre	1
Selsøen store	2
Sundøen	3
Selsøen lille	4
Rangsund	5
Haakaringen	6
Gjersvik	7
Langnes	8
Steinsland	9
Brensvik	10
Øresvik	11
Tømmerdal	12
Sørfjorden	13
Vasvik	14
Gjervalen	15
Kvalvik	16
Skeivik	17
Strand	18
Helvik	18, 2
Lines	19
Hellervik	20
Onøen ytre	21
Hytten	22
Sandvik	23
Kilhavn	24
Melfjorden	25
Nordfjordnes	26
Nordfjordholmen	27
Vaatvik	28
Hammerøen	29
Telnes	30
Einvik	31
Sperstad	32
Skjaavik	33
Kolvik	33, 3
Jægtvik	34
Forsdal	35
Aanes	36
Kvitnesvik	37
Mælen	38
Strømsnes	39
Kisten	40
Strømsvik	41
Eidvik	42
Værangen	43
Pladsen	44
Eskeholmen	45
Værnesosen	46
Værnes søndre	47
Rønvik	48
Bø	49
Værnes nordre	50
Kvalvik	51
Blok	52
Bjerga	53
Kjetvik	54
Reppen, 1	55
Reppen, 2	56
Breivik	57
Aarnes	58
Tjong, 1	59
Tjong, 2	60
Kilen	61
Æsvik	62
Segelfor	63
Vaagenge	64
Vaage	65
Sleipnes	66
Seines	67
Storsteinøren	68
Svinvær	69
Otervær	70
Myken	71
Valvær	71, 2
Gjesøen	72
Høivaagen	73
Rødøen	74
Flatøen	75
Gjerøen, 1	76
Gjerøen, 2	77
Gjærøhavn	78
Ringen	79

== Government ==
Rødøy Municipality is responsible for primary education (through 10th grade), outpatient health services, senior citizen services, welfare and other social services, zoning, economic development, and municipal roads and utilities. The municipality is governed by a municipal council of directly elected representatives. The mayor is indirectly elected by a vote of the municipal council. The municipality is under the jurisdiction of the Helgeland District Court and the Hålogaland Court of Appeal.

=== Municipal council ===
The municipal council (Kommunestyre) of Rødøy Municipality is made up of 17 representatives that are elected to four year terms. The tables below show the current and historical composition of the council by political party.

Rødøy kommunestyre 2023–2027
Party name (in Norwegian)	Number of representatives
Progress Party (Fremskrittspartiet)	1
Joint list of the Labour Party (Arbeiderpartiet) and the Christian Democratic Party (Kristelig Folkeparti)	10
Rødøy Common List (Rødøy fellesliste)	6
Total number of members:	17

Rødøy kommunestyre 2019–2023
Party name (in Norwegian)	Number of representatives
Progress Party (Fremskrittspartiet)	1
Centre Party (Senterpartiet)	3
Joint list of the Labour Party (Arbeiderpartiet) and the Christian Democratic Party (Kristelig Folkeparti)	9
Rødøy Common List (Rødøy fellesliste)	4
Total number of members:	17

Rødøy kommunestyre 2015–2019
Party name (in Norwegian)	Number of representatives
Progress Party (Fremskrittspartiet)	1
Centre Party (Senterpartiet)	6
Joint list of the Labour Party (Arbeiderpartiet) and the Christian Democratic Party (Kristelig Folkeparti)	7
Rødøy Common List (Rødøy fellesliste)	3
Total number of members:	17

Rødøy kommunestyre 2011–2015
Party name (in Norwegian)	Number of representatives
Progress Party (Fremskrittspartiet)	2
Coastal Party (Kystpartiet)	4
Centre Party (Senterpartiet)	6
Rødøy Common List (Rødøy fellesliste)	3
Steady Course (Stø kurs)	2
Total number of members:	17

Rødøy kommunestyre 2007–2011
Party name (in Norwegian)	Number of representatives
Labour Party (Arbeiderpartiet)	3
Christian Democratic Party (Kristelig Folkeparti)	2
Coastal Party (Kystpartiet)	2
Centre Party (Senterpartiet)	6
Rødøy common list (Rødøy fellesliste)	4
Total number of members:	17

Rødøy kommunestyre 2003–2007
Party name (in Norwegian)	Number of representatives
Labour Party (Arbeiderpartiet)	3
Conservative Party (Høyre)	1
Christian Democratic Party (Kristelig Folkeparti)	2
Coastal Party (Kystpartiet)	2
Centre Party (Senterpartiet)	5
Rødøy common list (Rødøy fellesliste)	4
Total number of members:	17

Rødøy kommunestyre 1999–2003
Party name (in Norwegian)	Number of representatives
Labour Party (Arbeiderpartiet)	4
Christian Democratic Party (Kristelig Folkeparti)	2
Centre Party (Senterpartiet)	6
Rødøy common list (Rødøy fellesliste)	3
Rødøy coastal party (Rødøy kystparti)	2
Total number of members:	17

Rødøy kommunestyre 1995–1999
Party name (in Norwegian)	Number of representatives
Labour Party (Arbeiderpartiet)	5
Christian Democratic Party (Kristelig Folkeparti)	1
Centre Party (Senterpartiet)	6
Rødøy common list (Rødøy fellesliste)	7
Free Voters (Frie Velgere)	2
Total number of members:	21

Rødøy kommunestyre 1991–1995
Party name (in Norwegian)	Number of representatives
Labour Party (Arbeiderpartiet)	5
Conservative Party (Høyre)	1
Christian Democratic Party (Kristelig Folkeparti)	1
Centre Party (Senterpartiet)	5
Rødøy common list (Rødøy Fellesliste)	6
Cross-party voting list (Tverrpolitisk valgliste)	3
Total number of members:	21

Rødøy kommunestyre 1987–1991
Party name (in Norwegian)	Number of representatives
Labour Party (Arbeiderpartiet)	5
Conservative Party (Høyre)	2
Christian Democratic Party (Kristelig Folkeparti)	2
Centre Party (Senterpartiet)	2
Rødøy common list (Rødøy fellesliste)	4
Cross-party election list for middle and southern Rødøy (Tverrpolitisk valgliste for midtre og søndre Rødøy)	6
Total number of members:	21

Rødøy kommunestyre 1983–1987
Party name (in Norwegian)	Number of representatives
Labour Party (Arbeiderpartiet)	8
Conservative Party (Høyre)	4
Christian Democratic Party (Kristelig Folkeparti)	3
Centre Party (Senterpartiet)	4
Liberal Party (Venstre)	1
Socialist common list (Sosialistisk Samlingsliste)	1
Total number of members:	21

Rødøy kommunestyre 1979–1983
Party name (in Norwegian)	Number of representatives
Labour Party (Arbeiderpartiet)	4
Conservative Party (Høyre)	5
Christian Democratic Party (Kristelig Folkeparti)	4
Socialist Left Party (Sosialistisk Venstreparti)	1
Joint list of the Centre Party (Senterpartiet) and the Liberal Party (Venstre)	6
Cross-party—political independents list (Tverrpolitisk—partipolitisk uavhengig liste)	1
Total number of members:	21

Rødøy kommunestyre 1975–1979
Party name (in Norwegian)	Number of representatives
Labour Party (Arbeiderpartiet)	5
Christian Democratic Party (Kristelig Folkeparti)	5
Socialist Left Party (Sosialistisk Venstreparti)	1
Mainland Free Voters' List (Fastlandets Frie Velgeres Liste)	9
Collaborative independents election list (Samarbeidernes Uavhengige Valgliste)	1
Total number of members:	21

Rødøy kommunestyre 1971–1975
Party name (in Norwegian)	Number of representatives
Labour Party (Arbeiderpartiet)	5
Christian Democratic Party (Kristelig Folkeparti)	4
Local List(s) (Lokale lister)	12
Total number of members:	21

Rødøy kommunestyre 1967–1971
Party name (in Norwegian)	Number of representatives
Labour Party (Arbeiderpartiet)	8
Christian Democratic Party (Kristelig Folkeparti)	4
Liberal Party (Venstre)	6
Local List(s) (Lokale lister)	3
Total number of members:	21

Rødøy kommunestyre 1963–1967
Party name (in Norwegian)	Number of representatives
Labour Party (Arbeiderpartiet)	7
Christian Democratic Party (Kristelig Folkeparti)	4
Liberal Party (Venstre)	5
List of workers, fishermen, and small farmholders (Arbeidere, fiskere, småbrukere liste)	2
Joint List(s) of Non-Socialist Parties (Borgerlige Felleslister)	2
Local List(s) (Lokale lister)	1
Total number of members:	21

Rødøy herredsstyre 1959–1963
Party name (in Norwegian)	Number of representatives
Labour Party (Arbeiderpartiet)	8
Conservative Party (Høyre)	1
Christian Democratic Party (Kristelig Folkeparti)	4
Liberal Party (Venstre)	5
Local List(s) (Lokale lister)	3
Total number of members:	21

Rødøy herredsstyre 1955–1959
Party name (in Norwegian)	Number of representatives
Labour Party (Arbeiderpartiet)	5
Conservative Party (Høyre)	1
Christian Democratic Party (Kristelig Folkeparti)	5
Local List(s) (Lokale lister)	10
Total number of members:	21

Rødøy herredsstyre 1951–1955
Party name (in Norwegian)	Number of representatives
Labour Party (Arbeiderpartiet)	7
Christian Democratic Party (Kristelig Folkeparti)	8
List of workers, fishermen, and small farmholders (Arbeidere, fiskere, småbrukere liste)	5
Total number of members:	20

Rødøy herredsstyre 1947–1951
Party name (in Norwegian)	Number of representatives
Labour Party (Arbeiderpartiet)	9
Local List(s) (Lokale lister)	11
Total number of members:	20

Rødøy herredsstyre 1945–1947
Party name (in Norwegian)	Number of representatives
Labour Party (Arbeiderpartiet)	9
List of workers, fishermen, and small farmholders (Arbeidere, fiskere, småbrukere liste)	2
Joint List(s) of Non-Socialist Parties (Borgerlige Felleslister)	1
Local List(s) (Lokale lister)	8
Total number of members:	20

Rødøy herredsstyre 1937–1941*
Party name (in Norwegian)	Number of representatives
Labour Party (Arbeiderpartiet)	6
List of workers, fishermen, and small farmholders (Arbeidere, fiskere, småbrukere liste)	8
Joint List(s) of Non-Socialist Parties (Borgerlige Felleslister)	3
Local List(s) (Lokale lister)	3
Total number of members:	20
Note: Due to the German occupation of Norway during World War II, no elections were held for new municipal councils until after the war ended in 1945.

=== Mayors ===
The mayor (Norwegian: ordfører) of Rødøy Municipality is the political leader of the municipality and the chairperson of the municipal council. Here is a list of people who have held this position:

- 1838–1840: Carl T. Schmidt
- 1840–1842: Jakob Andersen
- 1842–1844: Hans Krey Hansen
- 1844–1848: Ole S. Jæger
- 1848–1850: Knud T. Hoff
- 1850–1852: Petter Nielsen
- 1852–1856: Caspar Hansen
- 1856–1860: Sophus F. Søeberg
- 1860–1861: Anton Andersen
- 1861–1865: Børge Motzfeldt
- 1865–1867: Andreas Olsen
- 1867–1871: Hans M. Jæger
- 1871–1875: Børge Motzfeldt
- 1875–1876: Jakob Gjertsen
- 1877–1878: Anders Larsen Hoff
- 1879–1880: Jakob Gjertsen
- 1881–1888: Hans M. Jæger
- 1889–1896: Simon Dahl
- 1897–1898: Lars Larsen Hoff
- 1899–1907: Rafael Røsok
- 1908–1922: Jørgen A. Selsø
- 1923–1925: Wilhelm Hoff
- 1926–1934: Peter B. Andersen
- 1935–1940: Toralf Heen
- 1943–1944: Arnulf Hansen (NS)
- 1945–1947: Toralf Heen
- 1948–1951: Sigurd M. Carson (Ap)
- 1952–1959: Olav Hoff (KrF)
- 1960–1967: Sven Hansen (Sp)
- 1968–1971: Hans Aakre (KrF)
- 1972–1975: Sven Hansen (Sp)
- 1976–1979: Hans Aakre (KrF)
- 1980–1981: Magne Hansen (H)
- 1982–1983: Sven Hansen (Sp)
- 1984–1985: Gustav Lorentzen (Ap)
- 1986–1989: Bernt Johan Arntsen (Ap)
- 1990–1991: Gustav Lorentzen (Ap)
- 1992–1995: Bernt Johan Arntsen (Ap)
- 1995–2003: Johan Anton Svartis (Sp)
- 2003–2019: Olav Terje Hoff (Sp)
- 2019–present: Inger Dagmar Monsen (Ap)

== Notable people ==
- Hans Olav Lahlum (born 1973), a historian, crime author, chess player, and politician; known for his unconventional style (he grew up in Rødøy, a small community that he says he did not find enjoyable)
