= Meløy =

Meloy or Meløy may refer to:

== Places ==
- Meløy Municipality, a municipality in Nordland county, Norway
- Meløya, an island within Meløy Municipality in Nordland county, Norway
- Meløy Church, a church in Meløy Municipality in Nordland county, Norway
- Meloy House, a single-story wood-frame residential structure located in Mustang, Oklahoma, USA

== People ==
- Meloy (surname), a list of people with the surname Meloy
