= HNoMS Nordkapp =

1937 ship of the Royal Norwegian Navy

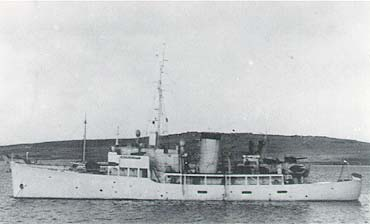
- Nordkapp off Iceland

History

Norway
- Name: Nordkapp
- Namesake: North Cape
- Builder: Horten naval shipyard
- Yard number: 123
- Launched: 18 August 1937
- Decommissioned: 29 July 1954
- Renamed: Skarodd (1956); Tor Hugo (1971)
- Fate: Sold to civilian owners in 1956, converted into fishing vessel, sank off West Africa on 27 November 1972

Service record
- Commanders: Lieutenant Commander Jon Seip
- Operations: Norwegian Campaign; Battle of the Atlantic; Shetland bus; Operation Neptune
- Victories: 6,031-ton German naval tanker Kattegat, 9 April 1940

General characteristics
- Displacement: 234 tons standard
- Length: 130.5 ft (39.78 m)
- Beam: 21.5 ft (6.55 m)
- Draft: 7.5 ft (2.29 m)
- Propulsion: Two Sulzer diesel engines with 580 hp, 1 shaft
- Speed: 13.7 knots (25.37 km/h)
- Range: 3,200 nautical miles (5,926.40 km); at 11 knots (20.37 km/h)
- Complement: As built: 22 men; After UK rebuild: 28 men
- Armament: As built: 1 × 47 mm gun; After UK rebuild: 1 × 3 in. (76 mm) Armstrong Whitworth main gun; 1 × 20 mm Oerlikon; 4 × 12.7 mm Colt Browning; AA machine guns; 12 × depth charges in two rows
- Notes: All the above listed information, unless otherwise noted, was acquired from

HNoMS Nordkapp was the lead ship of the Nordkapp class of fishery protection vessels. She was launched 18 August 1937 at Horten naval shipyard, with yard number 123. She had one sister ship, HNoMS Senja. Nordkapp was named after the North Cape in Finnmark. As was typical of her class, Nordkapp was very unstable in rough seas and was viewed from the beginning as a second-rate vessel. Nordkapp sailed throughout the Second World War and saw service in several theatres.

== Nordkapp in the Norwegian Campaign ==
When the Germans invaded Norway on 9 April 1940, Nordkapp was stationed in Northern Norway, belonging to the Royal Norwegian Navy's 3rd Naval District and commanded by Lieutenant Commander Jon Seip. During the Norwegian Campaign Nordkapp saw the first actions of her career.

=== Sinking Kattegat ===
==== Background ====
In the evening of 9 April Nordkapp intercepted the 6,031-ton German tanker Kattegat of Bremen in the Glomfjorden south of Narvik. Kattegat was one of two naval tankers the Germans intended to use in order to quickly refuel the ten destroyers of the Narvik task force, enabling them to escape back to Germany before the Royal Navy could trap and sink them. In preparation of her supply mission, Kattegat had departed the pilot station at Kopervik in Western Norway on 6 April, scheduled to arrive at Narvik on 9 April. The Kriegsmarine support tanker had sailed to Norway from Wilhelmshaven on the German North Sea coast on 3 April in preparation for the invasion. While the other tanker, the 11,766-ton whale oil factory ship Jan Wellem, had reached Narvik from the German Basis Nord at the Bolshaya Zapadnaya Litsa inlet on the Kola Peninsula in Russia before the German attack, the captain of Kattegat had been warned of a British naval mine field in the Vestfjorden (Operation Wilfred) and refused to continue, choosing instead to anchor up in Sandlågbukta, Neverdal at Ørnes in Meløy Municipality.

==== Hailing ====
After closing to a cable length of Kattegat, Lieutenant Commander Seip hailed the German tanker, demanding that it identified itself. In response the German captain signalled that "Vidkun Quisling had been made the new prime minister of Norway and that all Norwegian naval vessels were under orders to cooperate with the German Kriegsmarine". Seip would receive no information from Kattegat before he himself had given his name and rank. While this signal exchange was going on Kattegat dispatched radio messages asking for Kriegsmarine assistance and escorting the remainder of the way to Narvik.

Before he confronted the German ship, Nordkapp's commander had been instructed by the 3. Naval District to take her as a prize, but after speaking with two Norwegian pilots who had guided the German tanker a short time earlier he decided that this would be too hazardous an undertaking.

As the pilots, who had entered Nordkapp during the patrol boat's signal exchange with Kattegat, reported that the tanker's thirty-nine-man crew were all armed and wearing naval uniforms, Seip considered it impossible to board and seize the ship, since his own 22-man crew had a total of only four rifles amongst them. He assessed that to control the large German crew all the way into the port of Bodø while being outnumbered and probably out-gunned would have been too difficult.

==== Sinking ====
In response to the aggressive signals received from Kattegat, Seip signalled back a short message telling the German crew to abandon ship within 10 minutes or face the consequences. At the end of the ten minutes no reaction from the German crew had been observed and Nordkapp fired a warning shot. As still no reaction could be seen in the protruding darkness, four 47 mm rounds were fired into Kattegat's waterline. As the Germans had opened their ship's valves while leaving the tanker, Kattegat sank quickly. Thirty-four of the crew were brought on board Nordkapp as PoWs from a nearby wharf, while the remaining five managed to escape into the hills after their ship was sunk. The 34 PoWs from the German tanker were brought to Mosjøen and handed over to military authorities there.

==== Consequences and aftermath ====
The effect of removing Kattegat from the Germans' supply chain was devastating, the German destroyers at Narvik could only be refuelled two at a time, instead of the planned four at a time. Also, Jan Wellem did not hold enough fuel for all 10 of the German destroyers. Consequently, the German warships at Narvik failed to make their escape in time and were destroyed by the Royal Navy in the Battles of Narvik. As the five-destroyer-strong 2nd Destroyer Flotilla under Commodore Bernard Warburton-Lee entered the Ofotfjord on 10 April to initiate the First Battle of Narvik, Vice Admiral William Whitworth, in charge of the Royal Navy forces in the Narvik area, received a message from Norway stating that Kattegat had been intercepted and sunk 3 nautical miles (5.56 km) off shore.

Kattegat was later salvaged by the Norwegian military, with 1,400 tons of diesel and 207 barrels of grease unloaded at Svolvær. On 15 May, before Kattegat was ready to sail to Tromsø, she was bombed and damaged by a German aircraft. As the damaged ship still held 5,000 tons of oil, the local fishing boat fleet helped themselves to the cargo until the Germans arrived to retake the ship after the capitulation of mainland Norway in June. The short time Kattegat was in Norwegian hands she served under the name MT Bodø.

=== Guard and escort duties ===
The next task for Nordkapp after she had dealt with Kattegatt came on 13 April, when she was ordered to go to Brønnøysund. A German Heinkel He 115 seaplane had landed there after running out of fuel and been seized by the local police, who had taken the four German airmen into custody. The aircraft was captured intact with a full bomb load and was later flown to Tromsø by Royal Norwegian Navy Air Service lieutenant Sivertsen and pressed into Norwegian service.

From 16 to 22 April Nordkapp was deployed with a Royal Navy squadron of 14 warships and two troopships that had arrived at Sjonafjord north of Sandnessjøen. As the force split up and some of the destroyers sailed south, Nordkapp followed the main force north. During the time she followed the British vessels, the force was subjected to several German air attacks without the Norwegian ship suffering any damage.

=== Patrol and bombardment missions ===
After leaving the British task force, Nordkapp spent most of her time until late May patrolling and guarding a British mine field in the Andfjord in northern Nordland / southern Troms.

At 24 May she called at Bodø, and by 30 May the evacuation of 4,000 British Army troops from the Bodø region began. By that time Bodø had been heavily bombed by the Luftwaffe over several days, and German troops was observed advancing towards Røsvik north-east of Bodø. On 3 June Nordkapp was despatched together with the 463-ton British-operated Q-ship Ranen to the Leirfjorden to try to stop the advance of the enemy by sea. The two ships bombarded German forces in the area before splitting up and heading north, Nordkapp sailing to Svolvær.

=== Friendly fire incident and evacuation ===
On 7 June 1940 Nordkapp arrived at Svolvær and received the order that had been given by the Norwegian High Command to evacuate all operational naval vessels to allied ports. While most of the thirteen navy ships that escaped the capitulation of mainland Norway started their journeys that day, Nordkapp remained until the early hours of the next day in order to give refugees and volunteers more time to gather for the voyage to the United Kingdom. According to Lieutenant Commander Seip's orders, his ship's first destination abroad was to be the Faroe Islands.

In the evening of 7 June German aircraft bombed and destroyed an oil tank facility in the town. At around 0200hrs, before Nordkapp was ready to sail west and start five years of service in exile, two ships arrived at Svolvær and started destroying the remaining oil tanks with artillery fire. Assuming the ships to be German the second in command of Nordkapp, Ensign Andersen, who was in command of the ship as Lieutenant Commander Seip was in a conference on land at the time, sailed out and attacked the two unknown ships. As he opened up on the two ships with his single cannon, they quickly returned fire and a 45-minute artillery duel ensued. Neither side managed to hit their adversary during the fight, and eventually the two sides discovered each other's true identity. The ships Nordkapp had been battling for three-quarters of an hour were Ranen and the 655-ton Royal Navy ASW trawler Northern Gem. Ranen had been bombarding German positions together with Nordkapp just four days previously.

After the nearly fatal friendly fire incident, Nordkapp returned to Svolvær and took on board volunteers before leaving port at 0300hrs on 8 June. The passengers included 19 Royal Norwegian Navy personnel, many of whom were crew members of vessels sunk in the preceding two months.

On 9 June Nordkapp joined the British evacuation convoy. During the journey west the ships were attacked by German bombers but avoided suffering any damage.

After four days at sea Nordkapp reached Tórshavn on the Faroe Islands on 12 June, resupplying before continuing on to the United Kingdom.

== Service abroad ==
=== Iceland and the Shetland Bus ===
After arrival at Rosyth in Scotland on 18 June 1940 Nordkapp was rebuilt and rearmed and was declared operational on 14 September 1940. She was posted to Iceland from 21 September 1940. On Iceland she served as a patrol vessel until 9 September 1943 when she was transferred to Shetland in order to support the Shetland bus operations. At Shetland she operated from 22 September 1943 together with the RNoN patrol vessels Horten, Molde, Narvik and Risør.

=== Operation Neptune and Scapa Flow ===
Between D-day and 18 June 1944 Nordkapp took part in Operation Neptune, the naval part of the invasion of Normandy. On 6 June she escorted a convoy of transports from Southend-on-Sea on the Eastern coast of the UK to the British invasion beaches and thereafter escorted ships along the coast of Normandy. The main threat from which she protected allied shipping was that of German E-boat and U-boat attacks.

On 11 September 1944 she sailed from Portland to Aberdeen for maintenance and stayed there until 15 December 1944 when she was again transferred, this time to guard duties at the Home Fleet's main base at Scapa Flow, a role she would continue until 1 January 1945. Thereafter she moved to Lerwick, Shetland where she was based until VE day.

== Return to Norway ==
On 18 May 1945, ten days after the final German surrender in Norway, Nordkapp left her exile in Methil in the United Kingdom and sailed for home. Two days later, on 20 May, she arrived at her new base at the south-western port of Stavanger, ending almost five years of exile.

== Post-war ==
After the end of the Second World War Nordkapp resumed her pre-war duties as a coast guard vessel until being decommissioned and laid up in Horten on 29 July 1954. She was sold off to civilian ownership in 1956, finding a new career as a fishing vessel under two owners, first as Skarodd and then from 1971 as Tor Hugo. Her long career ended on 27 November 1972, when she sank off West Africa after suffering leaks and disastrous hull failure.

== See also ==
- List of World War II ships of less than 1000 tons
- List of Allied forces in the Normandy Campaign
- Nordkapp-class offshore patrol vessel modern ship class of the Norwegian Coast Guard.

== Bibliography ==
- Abelsen, Frank (1986). Norwegian naval ships 1939–1945 (in Norwegian and English). Oslo: Sem & Stenersen AS. ISBN 82-7046-050-8.
- Berg, Ole F. (1997). I skjærgården og på havet - Marinens krig 8. april 1940–8. mai 1945 (in Norwegian). Oslo: Marinens krigsveteranforening. ISBN 82-993545-2-8.
- Sivertsen, Svein Carl, ed. (1999). Jageren Sleipner i Romsdalsfjord sjøforsvarsdistrikt april 1940 (in Norwegian). Hundvåg: Sjømilitære Samfund ved Norsk Tidsskrift for Sjøvesen.
- Sivertsen, Svein Carl, ed. (2000). Med Kongen til fornyet kamp – Oppbyggingen av Marinen ute under Den andre verdenskrig (in Norwegian). Hundvåg: Sjømilitære Samfund ved Norsk Tidsskrift for Sjøvesen. ISBN 82-994738-8-8.
- Sivertsen, Svein Carl, ed. (2001). Sjøforsvaret dag for dag 1814-2000 (in Norwegian). Hundvåg: Sjømilitære Samfund ved Norsk Tidsskrift for Sjøvesen. ISBN 82-92217-03-7.
- Thomassen, Marius (1995). 90 år under rent norsk orlogsflagg (in Norwegian). Bergen: Eide Forlag. ISBN 82-514-0483-5.
- Waage, Johan (1963). Kampene om Narvik (in Norwegian). Oslo: Dreyers Forlag.
