= Kalsholmen Lighthouse =

Coastal lighthouse in Meløy, Norway

Kalsholmen Lighthouse Kalsholmen fyrstasjon
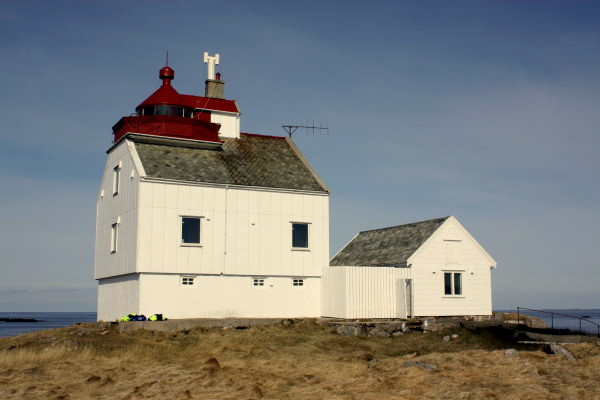
- View of the lighthouse
- Location of the lighthouse
- Location: Nordland, Norway
- Coordinates: 66°54′49″N 13°05′29″E

Tower
- Constructed: 1916
- Automated: 1993
- Height: 13.5 metres (44 ft)
- Markings: white with red top

Light
- First lit: 1919 (relocated)
- Focal height: 30.5 metres (100 ft)
- Intensity: 28,800 candela
- Range: Red: 10.9 nmi (20.2 km; 12.5 mi) Green: 10.4 nmi (19.3 km; 12.0 mi) White: 13.5 nmi (25.0 km; 15.5 mi)
- Characteristic: Oc(2) WRG 10s
- Norway no.: 683000

Kalsholmen Lighthouse (Norwegian: Kalsholmen fyr) is a coastal lighthouse in Meløy Municipality in Nordland county, Norway. It is located on the small island of Kalsholmen, about 15 kilometres (9.3 mi) west of the village of Støtt and 12 kilometres (7.5 mi) northwest of the village of Bolga.

The lighthouse was first established on the islet of Tennholmen in 1916, but it was destroyed by a windstorm in 1917. In 1919, the lighthouse was then rebuilt on the islet just to the east, Kalsholmen. It was automated in 1993.

The white tower is 13.5 metres (44 ft) tall. The light on top sits at an elevation of 30.5 metres (100 ft) above sea level. The 28,800-candela light can be seen for up to 13.5 nautical miles (25.0 km; 15.5 mi). The light is white, red or green (depending on direction) occulting twice every 8 seconds.

== See also ==
- Lighthouses in Norway
- List of lighthouses in Norway
