= Brattsund Bridge =

Brattsund Bridge Brattsund bru
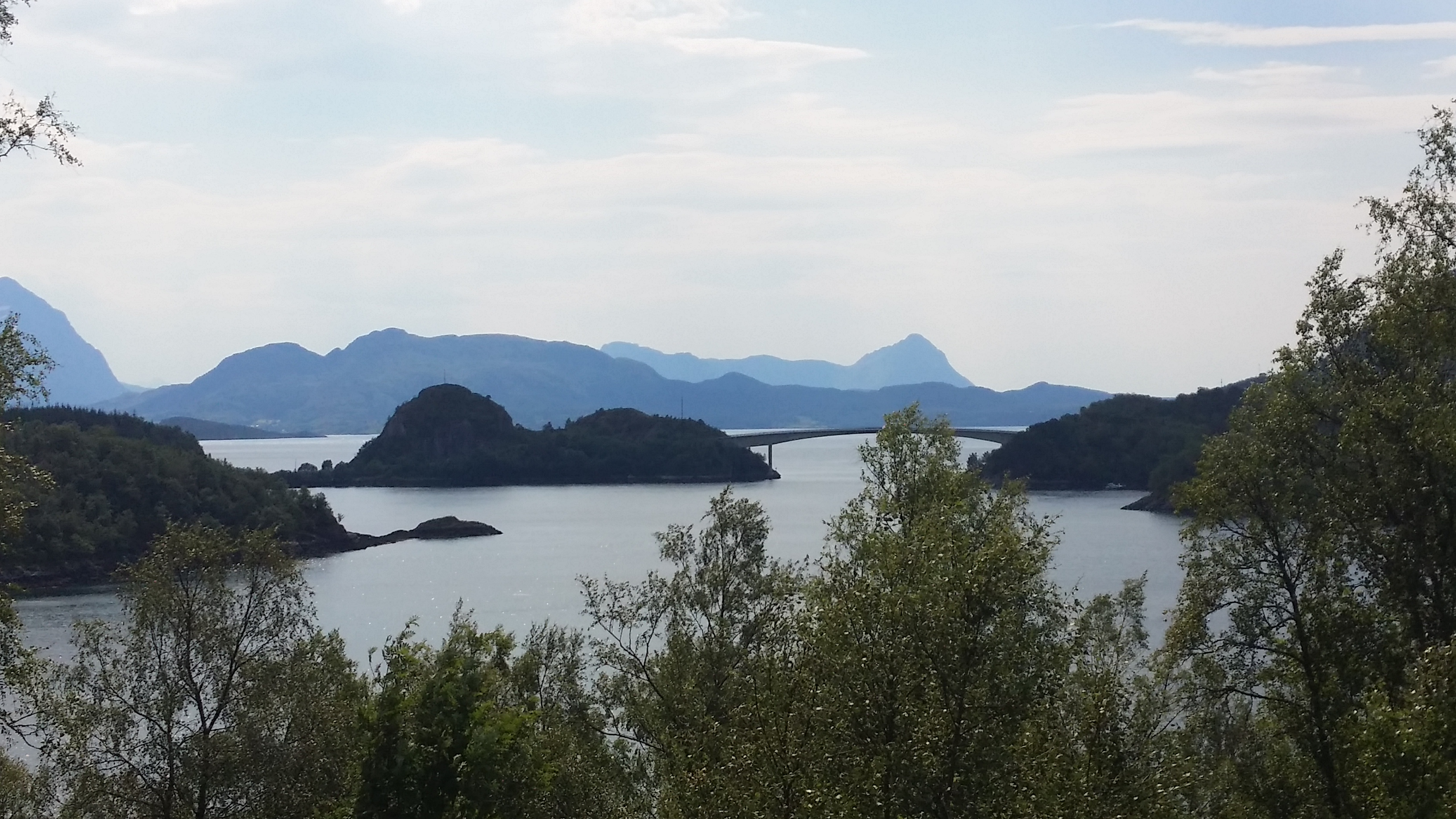
- The Brattsund Bridge in Meløy
- Coordinates: 66°46′41″N 13°30′12″E
- Carries: Fv464
- Crosses: Brattsundet strait
- Locale: Meløy Municipality, Nordland

Characteristics
- Material: Concrete
- Total length: 194 metres (636 ft)
- Longest span: 122 metres (400 ft)

The Brattsund Bridge (Norwegian: Brattsund bru) is a cantilever bridge in Meløy Municipality in Nordland county, Norway. It is part of the bridge connection between the islands of Åmøya and Grønøya, several small islands, and the mainland village of Engavågen. The bridge is 194 metres (636 ft) long, and the main span is 122 metres (400 ft). The bridge was constructed out of pre-stressed concrete.

== See also ==
- List of bridges in Norway
- List of bridges in Norway by length
- List of bridges
- List of bridges by length
