= Eidbukt =

Village in Meløy Municipality, Norway

Eidbukt Eidbukta
- Village
- Interactive map of Eidbukt
- Location within Nordland Location within Norway
- Coordinates: 66.8453°N 13.7321°E
- Country: Norway
- Region: Northern Norway
- County: Nordland
- District: Salten
- Municipality: Meløy Municipality

Area
  - Total: 0.76 km^{2} (0.29 sq mi)
- Elevation: 16 m (52 ft)

Population (2023)
  - Total: 542
  - Density: 713/km^{2} (1,850/sq mi)
- Time zone: UTC+01:00 (CET)
  - Summer (DST): UTC+02:00 (CEST)
- Post Code: 8149 Neverdal

Eidbukt is a village in Meløy Municipality in Nordland county, Norway. It is located along Norwegian County Road 17, about 5 kilometres (3.1 mi) south of the municipal centre of Ørnes. The village lies at the entrance to the Glomfjorden. The 0.76-square-kilometre (190-acre) village has a population (2023) of 542 and a population density of 713 inhabitants per square kilometre (1,850/sq mi).
