= Meløyavisa =

Norwegian newspaper

Meløyavisa (lit. 'The Meløy Gazette') is a local Norwegian newspaper published in Nordland county.

Meløyavisa was established in 1986. The newspaper is published twice a week in Ørnes in Meløy Municipality, and it covers news in the municipalities of Rødøy, Meløy, and Gildeskål. Its editor is Bente Haldorsen.

== Circulation ==
According to the Norwegian Audit Bureau of Circulations and National Association of Local Newspapers, Meløyavisa has had the following annual circulation:

- 2004: 3,128
- 2005: 2,919
- 2006: 2,796
- 2007: 2,955
- 2008: 2,479
- 2009: 2,533
- 2010: 2,171
- 2011: 1,882
- 2012: 1,939
- 2013: 1,991
- 2014: 2,002
- 2015: 1,872
- 2016: 1,823
