= Framtia =

Norwegian newspaper

Framtia (lit. 'The Future') is a local weekly Norwegian newspaper, published on Wednesdays in Ørnes in Nordland county. It covers events in Meløy Municipality and Gildeskål Municipality.

The newspaper is published by Mediehuset Meløy AS, and it first appeared on July 4, 2008. Framtia obtained a press subsidy from the government after its first year of publication. The paper's chief editor and general manager is Ingunn Dahle.

Mediehuset Meløy AS also published the monthly profile magazine IndustriFolk, which is funded by partners in the business community of the Meløy region. Mediehuset Meløy AS had a turnover of NOK 4.8 million in 2015 and is owned by Edmund Ulsnæs (96%) and Meløy Økonomisenter (4%).

== Circulation ==
According to the Norwegian Audit Bureau of Circulations and National Association of Local Newspapers, Framtia has had the following annual circulation:

- 2008: 1,047
- 2009: 1,234
- 2010: 1,276
- 2011: 1,326
- 2012: 1,345
- 2013: 1,403
- 2014: 1,678
- 2015: 1,728
- 2016: 1,675
