= Glomfjord Church =

Church in Nordland, Norway

- Glomfjord kirke
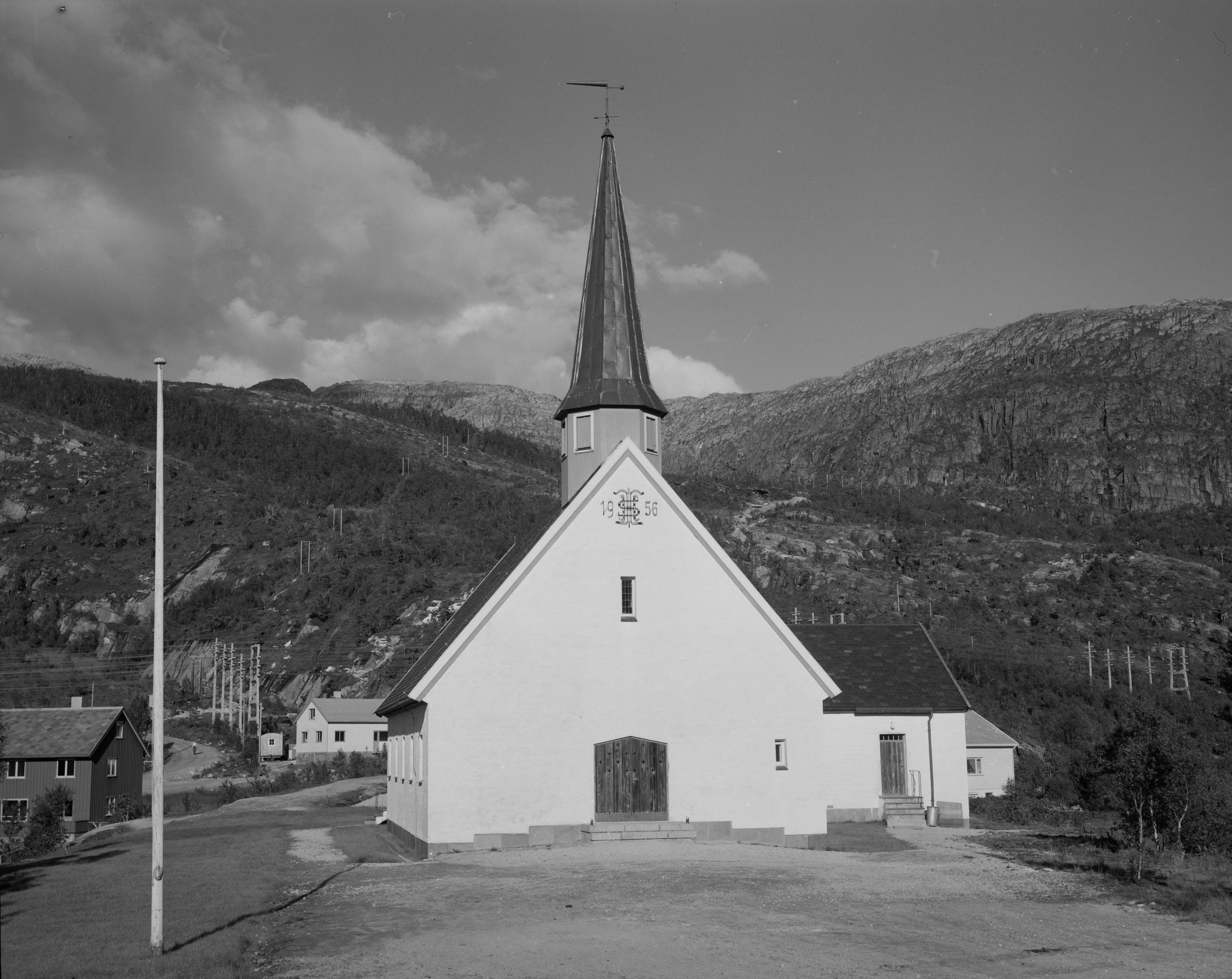
- View of the church
- Glomfjord Church
- 66.8164530°N 13.9587628°E
- Location: Meløy Municipality, Nordland
- Country: Norway
- Denomination: Church of Norway
- Churchmanship: Evangelical Lutheran

History
- Status: Parish church
- Founded: 1957
- Consecrated: 1957

Architecture
- Functional status: Active
- Architect(s): Gudolf Blakstad and Herman Munthe-Kaas
- Architectural type: Long church
- Completed: 1957 (69 years ago)

Specifications
- Capacity: 250
- Materials: Stone

Administration
- Diocese: Sør-Hålogaland
- Deanery: Bodø domprosti
- Parish: Glomfjord
- Norwegian Cultural Heritage Site
- Type: Church
- Status: Not protected
- ID: 84269

Glomfjord Church (Norwegian: Glomfjord kirke) is a parish church of the Church of Norway in Meløy Municipality in Nordland county, Norway. It is located in the village of Glomfjord. It is the church for the Glomfjord parish which is part of the Bodø domprosti (deanery) in the Diocese of Sør-Hålogaland. The white, plastered stone church was built in a long church style in 1957 using plans drawn up by the architects Gudolf Blakstad and Herman Munthe-Kaas. The church seats about 250 people.

== See also ==
- List of churches in Sør-Hålogaland
