= Bolga =

Island in Nordland, Norway

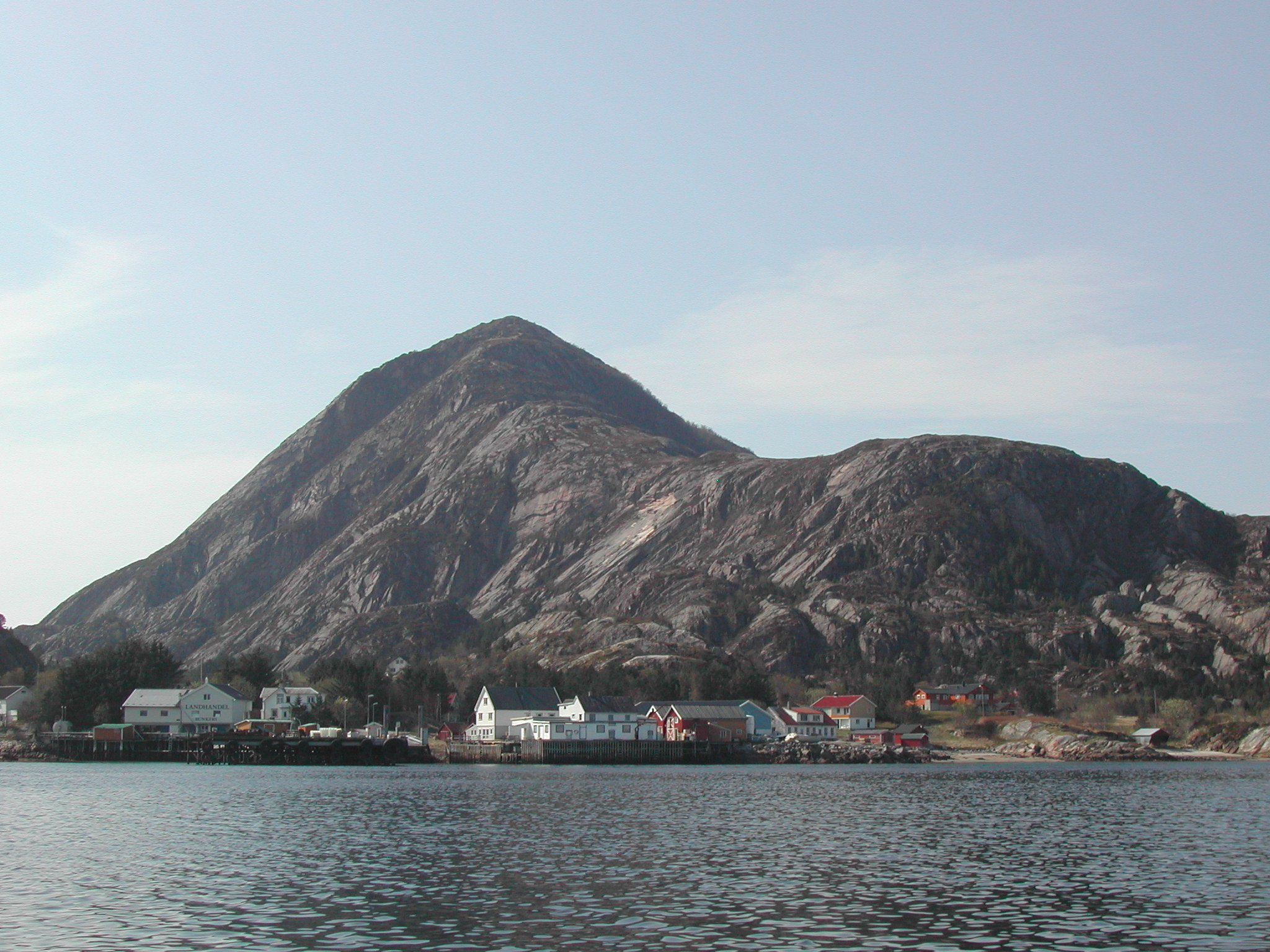
- Interactive map of Bolga

Geography
- Location: Nordland, Norway
- Coordinates: 66.8051°N 13.2342°E
- Area: 2.4 km^{2} (0.93 sq mi)
- Length: 2 km (1.2 mi)
- Width: 1.5 km (0.93 mi)
- Highest elevation: 339 m (1112 ft)
- Highest point: Bolgtinden

Administration
- Norway
- County: Nordland
- Municipality: Meløy Municipality

Demographics
- Population: 105 (2017)

Bolga is an island in Meløy Municipality in Nordland county, Norway. The 2.4-square-kilometre (0.93 sq mi) island has a population (2017) of 105. It is located west of the islands of Meløya and Åmøya, just off the coast of the Helgeland region. The highest point on the island is the 339-metre (1,112 ft) tall Bolgtinden. Most of the population of the island lives along the eastern shore in the village that is also known as Bolga. It is the only village on the island. There are regular ferry connections from Bolga to the islands of Meløya to the east and to Vassdalsvik and Ørnes on the mainland.

== See also ==
- List of islands of Norway
