= Ørnes Chapel =

Church in Nordland, Norway

- Ørnes menighetshus
- Ørnes Chapel
- 66.8748772°N 13.7124771°E
- Location: Meløy Municipality, Nordland
- Country: Norway
- Denomination: Church of Norway
- Churchmanship: Evangelical Lutheran

History
- Status: Chapel
- Founded: 1990
- Consecrated: 1990

Architecture
- Functional status: Active
- Architectural type: Long church
- Completed: 1990 (36 years ago)

Specifications
- Capacity: 300
- Materials: Wood

Administration
- Diocese: Sør-Hålogaland
- Deanery: Bodø domprosti
- Parish: Fore og Meløy

Ørnes Chapel (Norwegian: Ørnes menighetshus) is a chapel of the Church of Norway in Meløy Municipality in Nordland county, Norway. It is located in the village of Ørnes. It is an annex chapel in the Fore og Meløy parish which is part of the Bodø domprosti (deanery) in the Diocese of Sør-Hålogaland. The white, wooden chapel was built in a long church style in 1990. The chapel seats about 300 people as well as houses the parish offices.

== See also ==
- List of churches in Sør-Hålogaland
