= Glomfjord power plant =

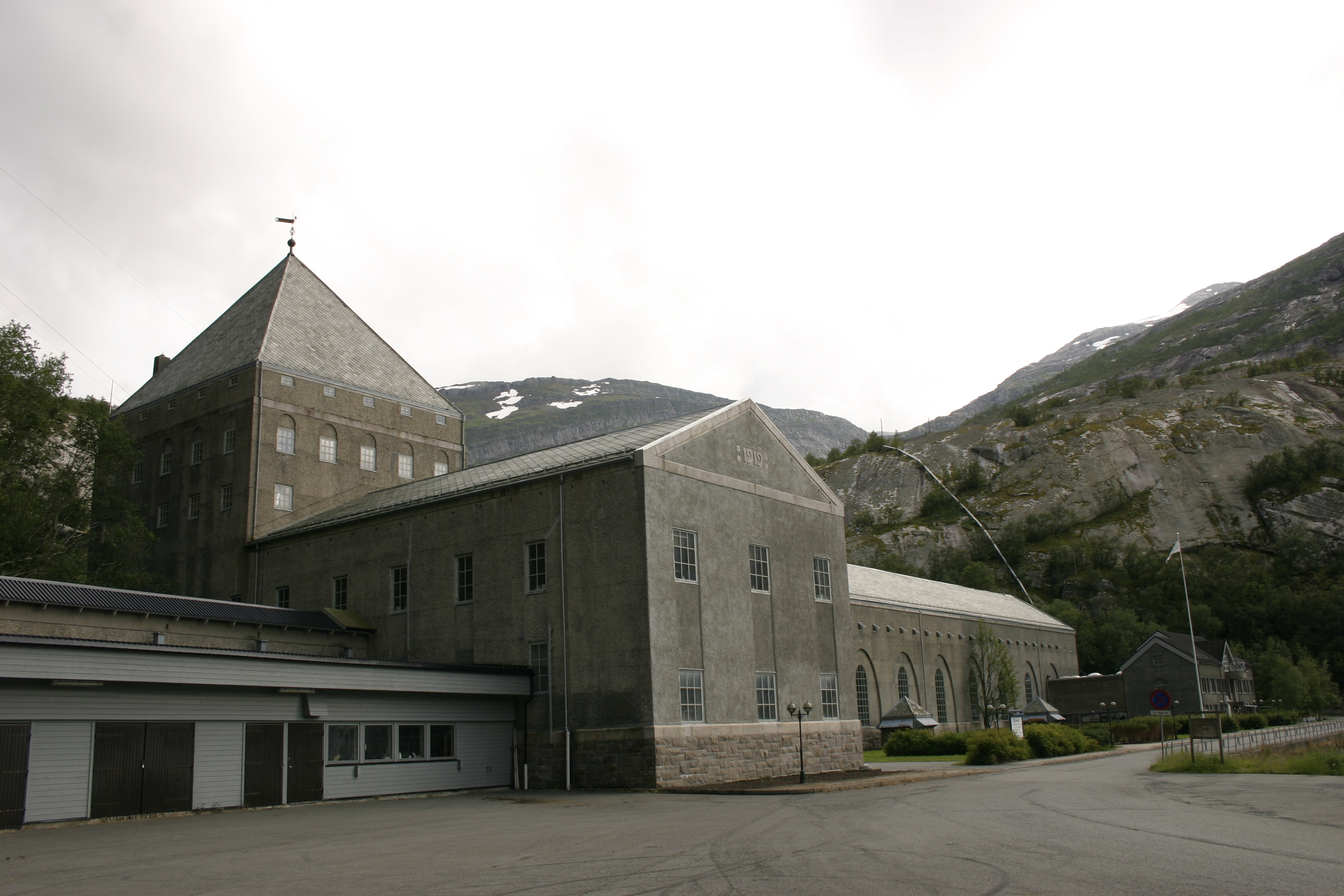
- Glomfjord power plant
- Official name: Glomfjord kraftverk
- Country: Norway
- Location: Glomfjord
- Coordinates: 66°47′47″N 13°59′45″E
- Status: Operational
- Construction began: 1912
- Opening date: 1920; 105 years ago
- Owner(s): Statkraft

Upper reservoir
- Creates: Nedre Navervatn

Lower reservoir
- Creates: Norwegian Sea

Power Station
- Hydraulic head: 464 metres (1,522 ft)
- Turbines: 1 × 20 megawatts (27,000 hp)
- Pump-generators: 0
- Pumps: 0
- Installed capacity: 20 MW
- Capacity factor: 48.5%
- Annual generation: 85 GW·h

Glomfjord power plant is a hydroelectric power plant in the village of Glomfjord in Meløy Municipality in Nordland county, Norway. It gets its water from Nedre Navervatn lake which is located about 465 metres (1,526 ft) above sea level. The plant also house a newer 2.4-megawatt (3,200 hp) Francis generator taking water from Fykanvatn lake as well. The outlet of the plant is the Glomfjorden and then the Norwegian Sea.

The plant is currently owned by Statkraft.

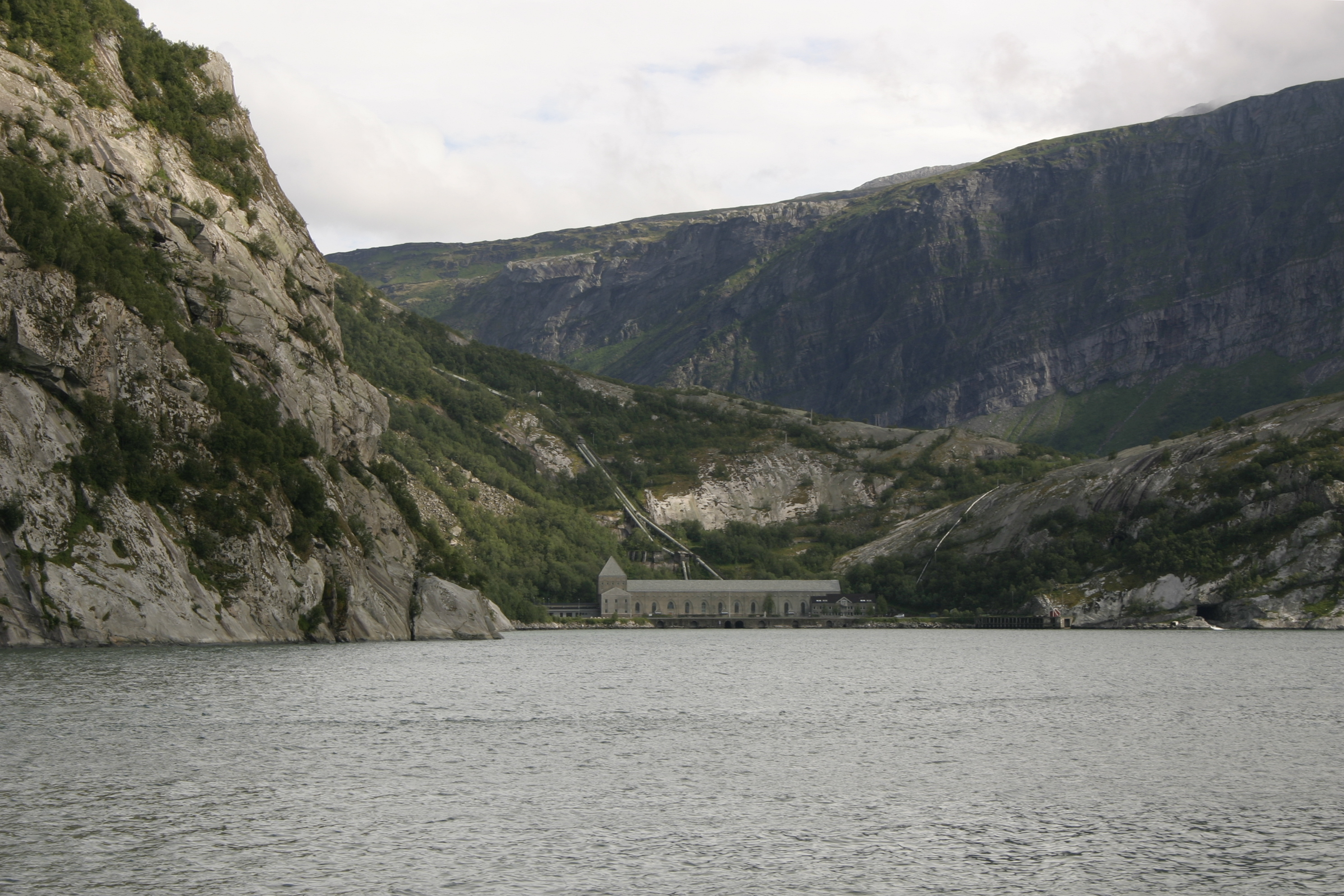
The power plant is located at the bottom of Glomfjord.

== History ==
The power plant was built in 1920 to a design by the architect Olaf Nordhagen. It opened with two Pelton turbines at 20 megawatts (27,000 hp) each delivering power at 25Hz. In 1922, a third one was opened. At the time these were the largest turbines in operation in Norway.

During the Second World War the Germans started expanding with three additional turbines, but in 1942 an Anglo-Norwegian raid, Operation Musketoon, attacked the German-held power plant. The plant slowly got back into operation, but the three generators were never completed by the end of the war. They were completed between 1948 and 1949. At this time it reached its peak of 120 megawatts (160,000 hp) from 6 equal Pelton turbines, which lasted until Svartisen power plant was completed in 1993.

Because Svartisen used most of the water, Glomfjord was scaled back and only generator 3 was being used. It was also converted to 50Hz operation and connected to the main power grid.

Today only generators 1-3 remains with only number 3 in normal operation. Generators 4-6 were removed around 2012 to make room for a 2.4-megawatt (3,200 hp) Francis turbine using water from Fykanvann that opened in 2013.
