= Mesøya =

Island in Nordland, Norway

- Interactive map of Mesøya

Geography
- Location: Nordland, Norway
- Coordinates: 66.8596°N 13.6386°E
- Area: 8 km^{2} (3.1 sq mi)
- Length: 4.5 km (2.8 mi)
- Width: 3 km (1.9 mi)
- Highest elevation: 364 m (1194 ft)
- Highest point: Mesøytoppen

Administration
- Norway
- County: Nordland
- Municipality: Meløy Municipality

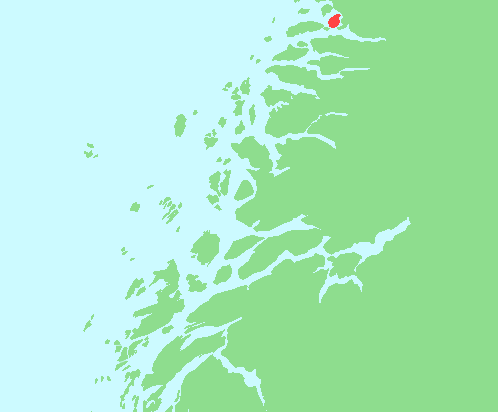
Locator map of Mesøya, Nordland, Norway

Mesøya is an island in Meløy Municipality in Nordland county, Norway. The island is located just southwest of the village of Ørnes on the mainland and east of the island of Meløya. The island sits at the mouth of the Glomfjorden. Mesøya is only accessible by boat, and it has no regular ferry service. Mesøya has an area of 8 square kilometres (3.1 sq mi) and the highest point on the island is the 364-metre (1,194 ft) tall Mesøytoppen.

== See also ==
- List of islands of Norway
