= Meløya =

Island in Meløy, Norway

Meløya Meløy
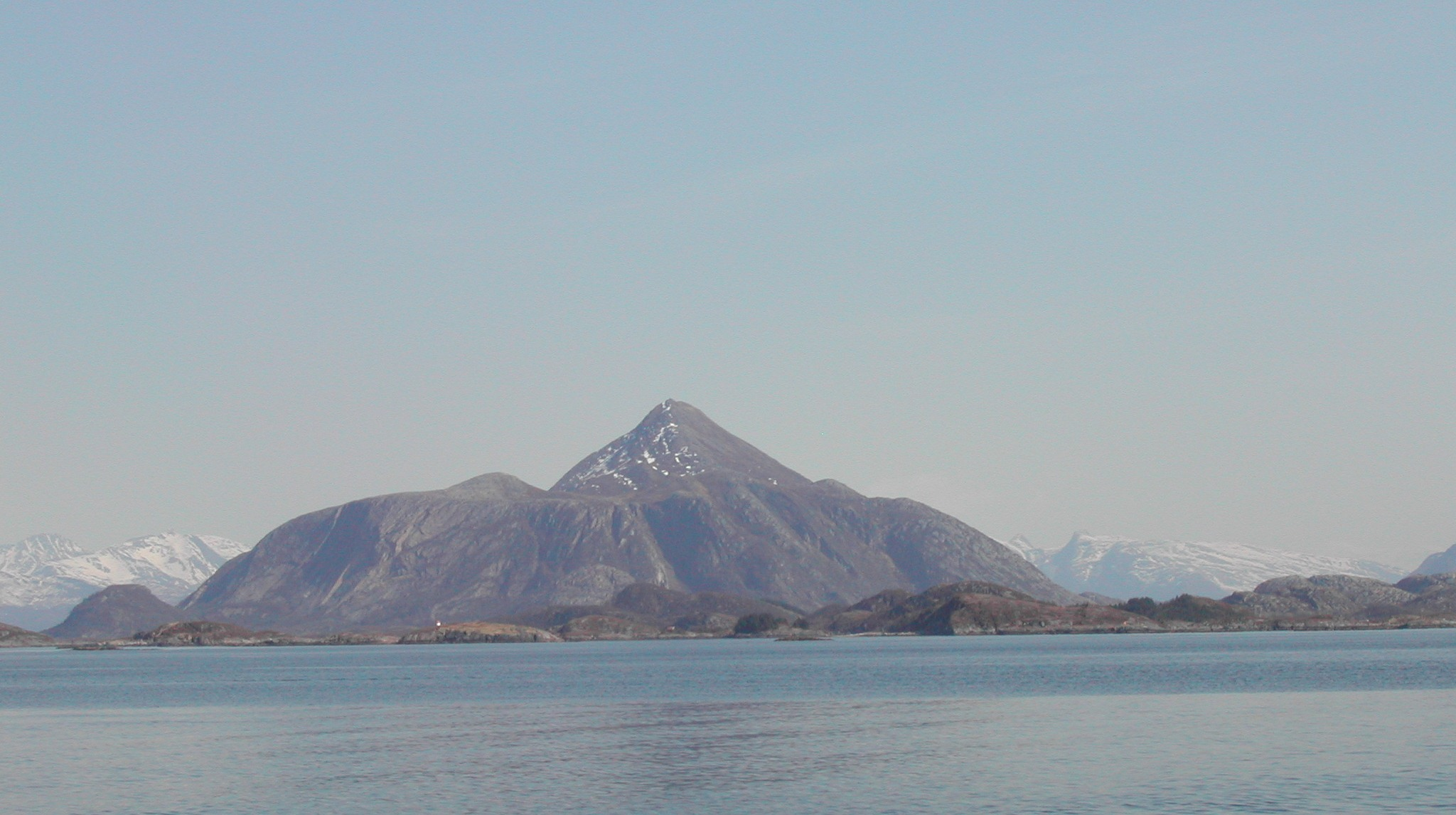
- Interactive map of Meløya; Meløy

Geography
- Location: Nordland, Norway
- Coordinates: 66.8327°N 13.4563°E
- Area: 21.8 km^{2} (8.4 sq mi)
- Length: 11 km (6.8 mi)
- Width: 3 km (1.9 mi)
- Highest elevation: 582 m (1909 ft)
- Highest point: Meløytinden

Administration
- Norway
- County: Nordland
- Municipality: Meløy Municipality

Demographics
- Population: 215 (2017)

Meløya is an island in Meløy Municipality in Nordland county, Norway. The island lies east of the island of Bolga, north of the island of Åmøya, and west of the island of Mesøya. The 21.8-square-kilometre (8.4 sq mi) island is only accessible by boat, and there are regular ferry connections to the nearby villages of Bolga, Støtt, Vassdalsvik, and Ørnes. The island has a population (2017) of 215.

The western part of the island is relatively flat and has many farms. The village of Meløy is located in this area and it is the main population centre on the island. Meløy Church is located in the village of Meløy. The village of Meløy was the administrative centre of Meløy Municipality until 1952 when it was moved to the village of Ørnes on the mainland. The eastern part of the island is mountainous, and it is dominated by the 582-metre (1,909 ft) tall Meløytinden.

== See also ==
- List of islands of Norway
