= Operation Musketoon =

1942 World War II military operation

Coordinates: 66°47′47″N 14°00′03″E

- Part of the Second World War
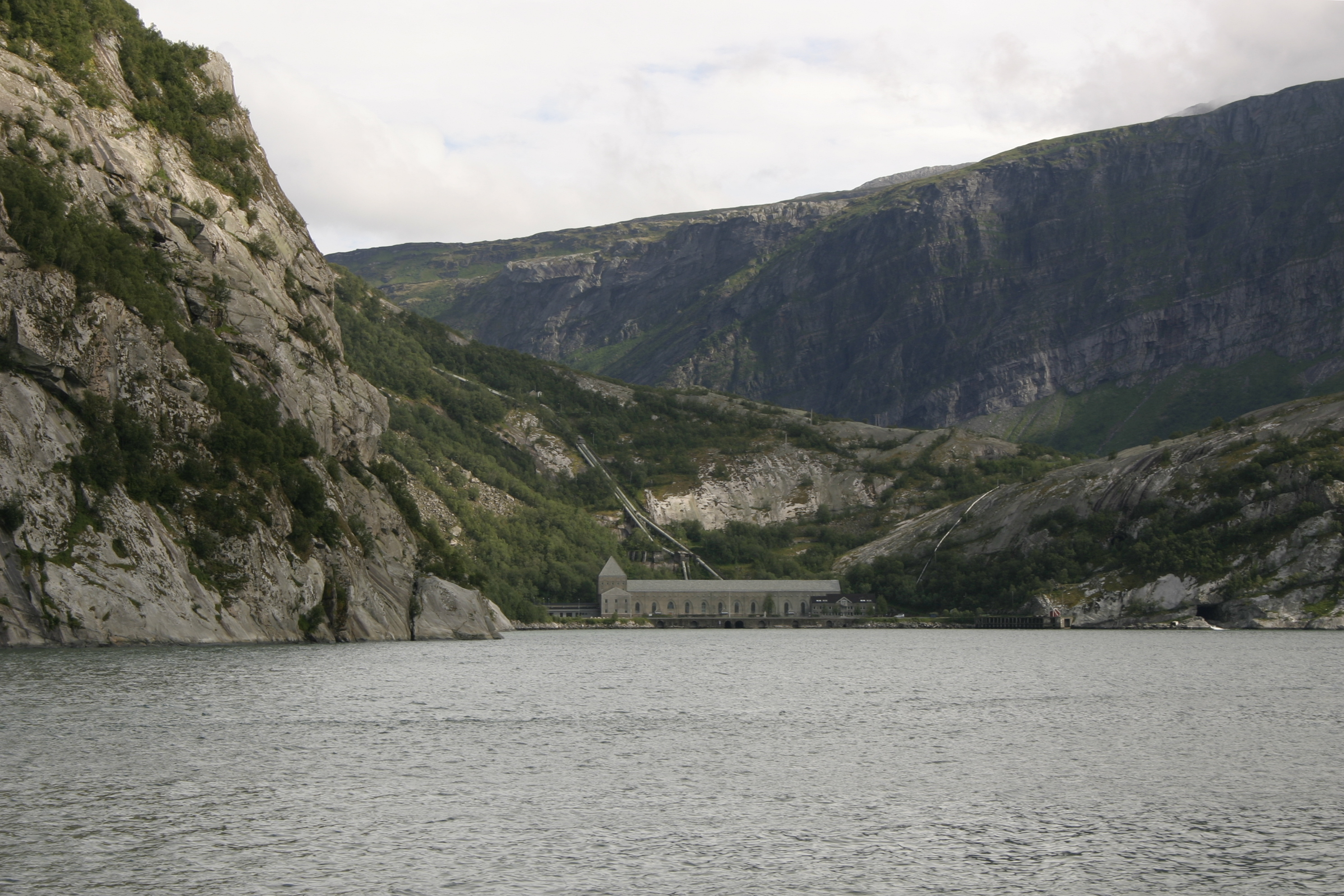
- Glomfjord power plant at the end of Glomfjord
Date	11–21 September 1942
Location	Glomfjord, Norway
Result	Allied victory

Belligerents
United Kingdom; Norway	Germany

Commanders and leaders
(United Kingdom) Graeme Black	(Nazi Germany) Nikolaus von Falkenhorst

Units involved
No. 2 Commando; Norwegian Independent Company 1	340th Infantry Regiment; 233rd Artillery Regiment (from 196th Infantry Division)

Strength
British: 9 Norwegian: 2 Canadian: 1	

Casualties and losses
1 killed 7 captured (later executed)	2 killed 2 wounded

Operation Musketoon was the codeword for a British–Norwegian commando raid in the Second World War. The operation was mounted against the German-held Glomfjord power plant in Norway from 11 to 21 September 1942.

The raiders consisted of two officers and eight men from No. 2 Commando and two men of the Norwegian Armed Forces in exile who were part of the Special Operations Executive. Crossing the North Sea by submarine, on arrival in Norway they attacked and damaged the plant, which was closed for the rest of the war.

To evade German search parties, the commandos split into two groups. One group of four men reached Sweden and were eventually repatriated to the United Kingdom. The second group was captured; one man died of wounds and the other seven were taken to Germany, interrogated and then executed at Sachsenhausen concentration camp.

== Background ==
After the British Expeditionary Force had been evacuated from Dunkirk in Operation Dynamo in 1940, the Prime Minister Winston Churchill called for a force to be assembled and equipped to inflict casualties on the Germans and bolster British morale. Churchill told the joint Chiefs of Staff to propose measures for an offensive against German-occupied Europe, "They must be prepared with specially trained troops of the hunter class who can develop a reign of terror down the enemy coast". A staff officer, Lieutenant-Colonel Dudley Clarke, had submitted a proposal to General Sir John Dill, the Chief of the Imperial General Staff, who approved Clarke's proposal. Three weeks later, the first commando raid took place. The raiders failed to gather any intelligence or damage any German equipment but killed two German sentries.

No. 2 Commando was a commando unit of the British Army. The original No. 2 Commando, unlike the other commando units, was formed from British volunteers and was always intended to be a parachute unit. On 22 June 1940, No. 2 Commando was turned over to parachute duties and on 21 November, was renamed the 11th Special Air Service Battalion and eventually 1st Parachute Battalion. After its renaming as the 11th Special Air Service Battalion, a second No. 2 Commando was formed. This new No. 2 Commando was under the command of Lieutenant Colonel Augustus Charles Newman, Their first action was when two Troops supported No. 3 Commando in the Vaagso Raid (Operation Archery) in December 1941, followed by the St Nazaire Raid in March 1942. The next action involving men of No. 2 Commando was Operation Musketoon. The objective was to destroy the Glomfjord power plant, south of Narvik, which supplied an aluminium plant in the area.

Glomfjord power station was built at the end of Glomfjord in 1918 on a plateau dropping straight down to the sea. The plant comprised three buildings, the longest was the machinery hall, the middle building housed the control room and offices and the last building was three-storeyed and known as the apparatus house. It was a hydroelectric power station supplied by two water pipes coming down the mountain from inland lakes. Apart from the aluminium factory, the station supplied power to local villages.

== Mission ==
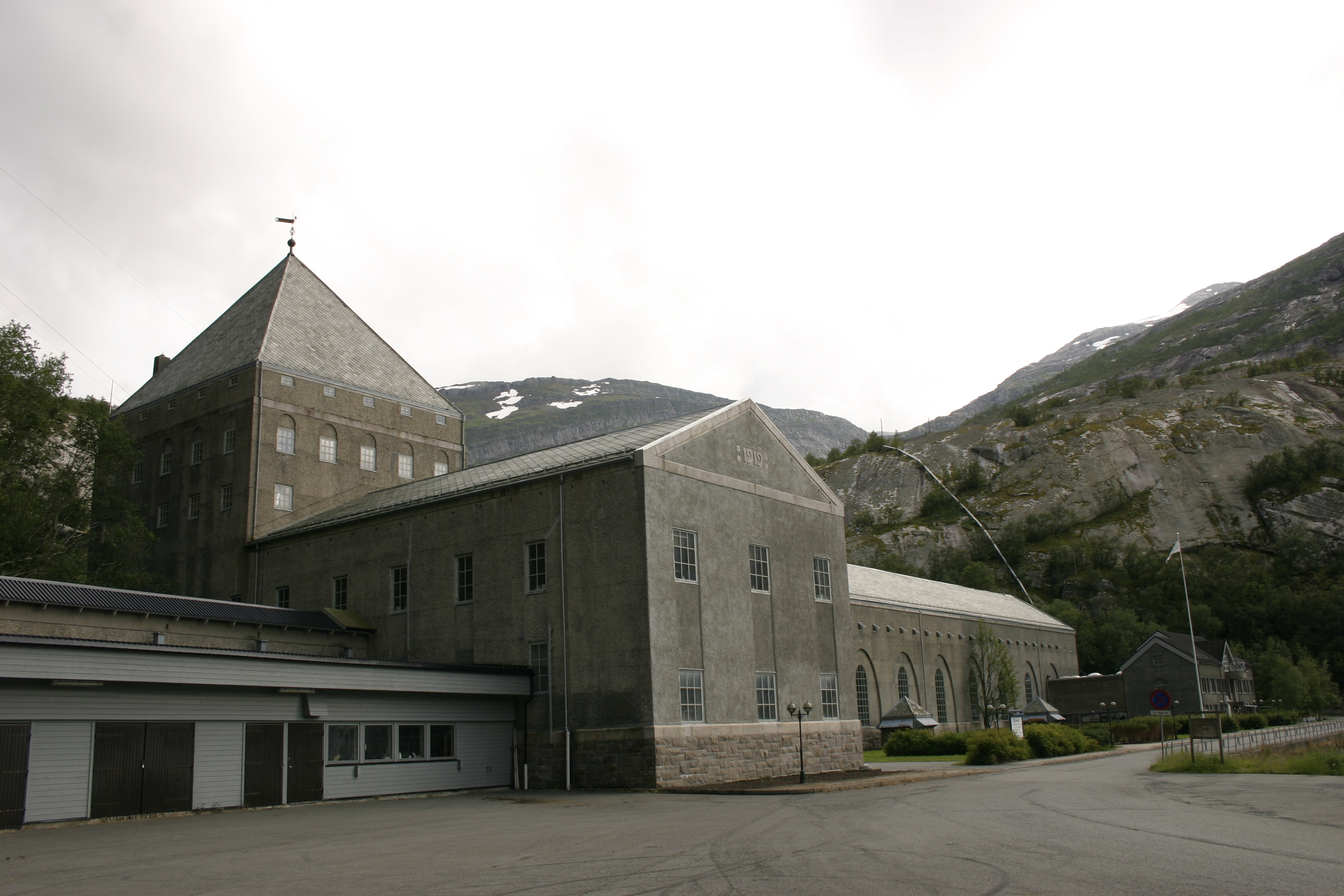
Close up of the front of Glomfjord power plant

Two officers and eight men from No. 2 Commando and two Norwegian corporals from the Norwegian Independent Company 1, part of the Special Operations Executive were selected for Operation Musketoon. The raid was commanded by Captain Graeme Black, from Dresden, Ontario in Canada and the second in command, Captain Joseph Houghton. The other men from No. 2 Commando were Company Sergeant Major Miller Smith, Lance Sergeant Richard O'Brien, Lance Bombardier William Chudley and privates John Fairclough, Cyril Abram, Eric Curtis, Reginald Makeham and Fred Trigg. The two Norwegian corporals were Erling Djupdraet and Sverre Granlund.

Before leaving for Norway, the team trained for a fortnight on a large country estate in Scotland. During the planning the commandos were supposed to be picked up after the raid by a Short Sunderland flying boat but this was cancelled before the mission due to the risk to the aircraft. The party was to head for neutral Sweden instead. Each man was issued with special equipment, including a silk map of Norway and Sweden, a Washi paper map of Russia and Norwegian kroner banknotes. They also carried two compasses (one sewn into each collar tab), a hacksaw blade, a fighting knife and a Colt M1911 pistol. The only other small arm taken was a suppressed Sten gun, carried by Captain Houghton.

=== Sea crossing ===
To transport the raiders across the North Sea, a Minerve-class submarine, Junon, belonging to the Free French Navy was used, under the command of Commander Querville. Junon was selected because in silhouette it had the appearance of a German U-boat, which could be advantageous if sighted on the surface. The submarine left the Orkney Islands at 11:40 on 11 September 1942, under escort in British waters by HMS Sturgeon, Tigris and Thunderbolt. Junon crossed the North Sea undetected and near Glomfjord, rose to periscope depth and discovered that a fishing boat was trailing them. The boat crash-dived but this sighting does not appear to have compromised the operation. The commander of the raid, Captain Black, had decided against a frontal assault since he suspected any German defences would expect one. The submarine entered the Bjaerangsfjord just south of Glomfjord on 15 September.

=== Raid ===
The submarine settled on the bottom of the fjord until darkness and surfaced at 21:15 to put the commandos ashore by dinghy. Reaching the shore, they hid their dinghy under some stones and moss, then set out across the mountains to Glomfjord, reaching the Svartisen undetected. Houghton and Granlund, a Norwegian, went ahead to reconnoitre the area before the party began to climb the mountain. At one stage they had to traverse a near-vertical rock face before reaching the summit. The commandos did not know that their presence was suspected. A German topographical party was in the area and its commander, Leutnant Wilhelm Dehne, had spotted some unidentified figures above the Glomfjord. Later he discovered some Player's cigarette packs and the remains of a camp. Fortunately for the commandos, his route back to Glomfjord took him away from their new camp overlooking the power station.

Resting in their hideout for the following day, the commandos went over their plan of attack and withdrawal from the area. They left their encampment at 20:00 (8:00 p.m.) on 17 September, to begin the attack. On their approach they detected a small craft on the fjord; fearing they would be spotted, they decided to postpone the action and return to camp. By dawn they had not been able to reach their hideout; while they were in an exposed location they still decided it would be best to stay put until nightfall. Reaching their hideout again on the night of 18/19 September. The commandos were running short on supplies and Black ordered the attack to proceed the following night, 19/20 September, no matter what.

The commandos were divided into two groups for the attack. One group consisting of Lance Sergeant O'Brien, Lance Bombardier Chudley and Private Curtis were to attack two high-pressure water pipes 7 ft (2.1 m) in diameter, leading from the top of the mountain into the plant. Reaching their objective, they planted plastic explosives in a round pattern to blow a 3 ft (0.91 m) hole in the pipes. Attaching a 30-minute delayed fuse, they waited to hear the sound of explosives going off inside the plant, which was the signal to activate their fuse.

The other nine commandos had set out for the rear of the power plant; seven entered the machinery hall, leaving two commandos on guard. The commandos in the power station discovered that the Germans had left the control room and only a Norwegian engineer was on duty. Sergeant Smith and Private Fairclough were detailed to plant their explosives among the machinery in the powerhouse and the other commandos located the area where the Norwegian staff worked and slept. The workers were gathered up and ordered to leave the station via an access tunnel over 1 mi (1.6 km) long, which was the only land route between the station and the villages in the fjord. On their approach to the tunnel, a German guard was killed by Granlund and another managed to run off down the tunnel to raise the alarm. In order to delay German reinforcements, the commandos left smoke bombs inside the tunnel. By this time the commandos in the station had set their plastic explosives with 10-minute delay fuses on both turbines and generators.

=== Capture ===
Upon hearing the explosions at the power plant, O'Brien's group detonated their explosives and both groups withdrew to the hills, just as German reinforcements were arriving at the plant. The Germans were unwilling to enter the tunnel, fearing it might be booby trapped and used boats belonging to the villagers to bypass the tunnel and reach the station. Granlund had pressed on ahead of the main group trying to find a foot bridge to aid their escape. He found a mountain hut occupied by three Norwegians whom he asked for directions; the best they could do was draw him a map. Granlund left to look again but returned to the hut soon after, being unable to find it in the dark at the same time as Houghton and the other Norwegian, Djupdraet. Unknowingly while Granlund had been away two Germans had arrived at the hut and were busy questioning the occupants. In the ensuing fight, one of the Germans was killed and the other wounded. Djupdraet was also wounded, stabbed in the stomach with a bayonet.

The remaining commandos arrived at the scene and administered first aid to Djupdraet. His wound was so severe that they decided to leave him behind to get treatment. The remaining commandos now split into two groups to evade German search parties and made their way further up the mountain. One group, consisting of O'Brien, Granlund, Fairclough and Trigg, went north around the mountains. The second group of Black, Houghton, Smith, Chudley, Curtis, Abram and Makeham, took the southern route. The second group were discovered by the Germans who opened fire, wounding Houghton in the right arm; surrounded, they were forced to surrender. The O'Brien group split up, Granlund setting off by himself; they eventually reached Sweden without further incident and all four were repatriated by aircraft to RAF Leuchars. Djupdraet died of his wounds in hospital, three days after the raid. The other seven prisoners of war were sent to Germany.

"Who are you?" Bruce asked Black.
"Who are you?" Black parried.
"I'm an R.A.F. Officer", Bruce.
"Where from?" said Black.
"I'm a Tynesider. But I haven't been there for a while. Where are you from?" asked Bruce.
"Norway".
"Well, if you want any messages sent home to England, we can send them for you", said Bruce.
"Tell them things went all right in Norway", replied Black.

— Conversation in the civilian cells between Bruce, who was serving time in solitude for an escape attempt and Black, who would go on to be executed on Hitler's orders.

The unwounded prisoners were sent to Colditz Castle and put into the solitary confinement, where Black managed to make contact with Flight Lieutenant Dominic Bruce RAF (known as The Medium Sized Man) giving him and others their names which were passed on to MI5 in London. Bruce was the last British person to speak to Black; on 13 October 1942 they were taken to the SS-Reichssicherheitshauptamt (RHSA) headquarters in Berlin, where they were interrogated one by one by Gruppenführer Heinrich Müller.

They remained in Berlin until 22 October, when they were taken to Sachsenhausen concentration camp. On the next day, 23 October, they were shot in the back of the neck and their bodies cremated. These commandos were the first to die under the Commando Order issued on 18 October 1942 by Adolf Hitler, which called for the execution of all captured commandos. The official German story given to the Red Cross was that the seven men had escaped and not been recaptured.

== Aftermath ==
The raid was considered a great success as it seemed likely that the power station would be closed for the duration of the war. After returning to the United Kingdom and a debriefing, O'Brien was awarded the Distinguished Conduct Medal and Trigg and Fairclough were awarded Military Medals. Granlund was killed in February 1943, along with one British and four Norwegian commandos as part of Operation Seagull, when the Norwegian submarine HNoMS Uredd sank off the Norwegian coast. Trigg was killed in Italy and is buried at the Cassino memorial; O'Brien and Fairclough survived the war.

On 15 November 1945, Black was awarded the Distinguished Service Order and Houghton the Military Cross backdated to 22 November 1942. Black and Houghton and the other five men of Operation Musketoon are commemorated on the Sachsenhausen Concentration Camp memorial plaque and the Brookwood Memorial. The Brookwood memorial is for men and women of the British and Commonwealth armies who died during the Second World War and have no known grave.

The German commander in Norway, Generaloberst Nikolaus von Falkenhorst, was captured after the war and tried by a British military court, for his part in carrying out the Commando Order. Found guilty on all eight charges of urging the forces under his command to kill men captured in commando raids or handing prisoners of war over to the Sicherheitsdienst (SD) for execution, he was sentenced to death, which was later commuted to life imprisonment. He was released in 1953 and died in 1968.
