= Meloy (surname) =

Meloy is a surname. Notable people with the surname include:

Thomas Benjamin Meloy (born 2002), American athlete and professional

- Colin Meloy (born 1974), American singer-songwriter and author
- Ellen Meloy (1946–2004), American writer
- Francis E. Meloy, Jr. (1917–1976), American diplomat
- Guy S. Meloy, Jr. (1903–1964), United States Army general
- Maile Meloy (born 1972), American writer
- Paul Meloy (born 1966), English writer
