= Glomfjord =

Village in Meløy Municipality, Norway

- Village
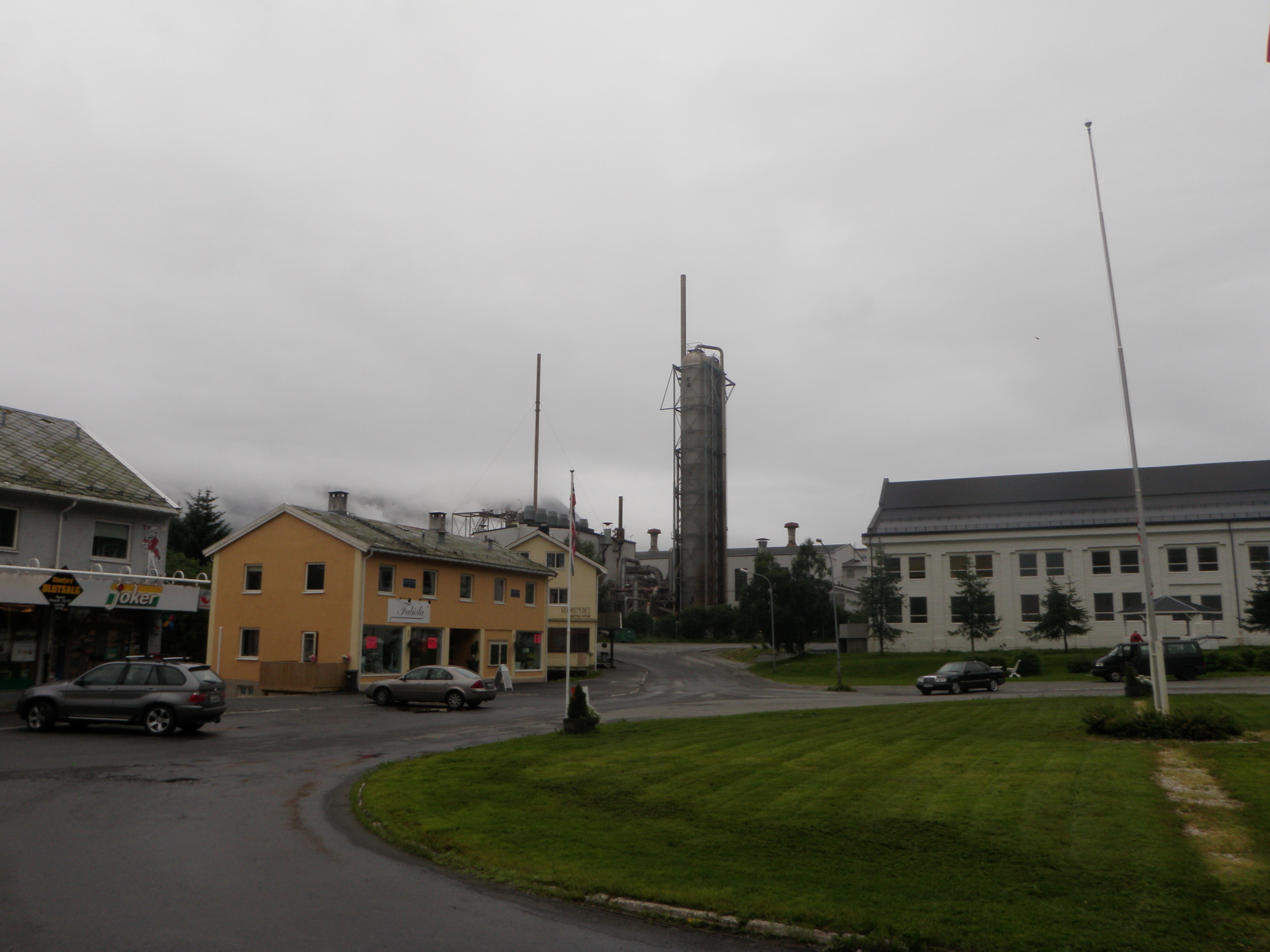
- View of the village
- Interactive map of Glomfjord
- Location within Nordland Location within Norway
- Coordinates: 66.8166°N 13.9440°E
- Country: Norway
- Region: Northern Norway
- County: Nordland
- District: Salten
- Municipality: Meløy Municipality

Area
  - Total: 1.19 km^{2} (0.46 sq mi)
- Elevation: 111 m (364 ft)

Population (2023)
  - Total: 1,089
  - Density: 915/km^{2} (2,370/sq mi)
- Time zone: UTC+01:00 (CET)
  - Summer (DST): UTC+02:00 (CEST)
- Post Code: 8160 Glomfjord

Glomfjord is a village in Meløy Municipality in Nordland county, Norway. The industrial community is located along Norwegian County Road 17 at the head of the Glomfjorden, just north of the Arctic Circle. The 1.19-square-kilometre (290-acre) village has a population (2023) of 1,089 and a population density of 915 inhabitants per square kilometre (2,370/sq mi).

In 2020, Fykantrappa – a popular outdoor stairway – was permanently closed after being in operation since 1919.

== Heavy industry ==
The village is based around the Glomfjord hydroelectric power plant, which was the target of the 1942 commando raid entitled Operation Musketoon. Norsk Hydro began construction for fertilizer production here in 1912, with power production starting in 1920. The facilities were bought by the state in 1918, but leased to Hydro in 1947 (now the fertilizer division is known as Yara International). Today a conglomerate of industries are found in Glomfjord Industry Park. The Forså and Sundsfjord hydroelectric power stations were also built to supply power to industry in Glomfjord in 1963.

== Climate ==
Although located north of the Arctic Circle and not far from Norway's second largest glacier Svartisen, the climate is well suited for living due to the Gulf Stream, albeit rather wet. The temperature is seldom below −10 °C (14 °F) during winter time. During summer time the sun does not set. The midnight sun also makes the plants grow faster. Although it is above the Arctic Circle the sun does not stay below the horizon in any time period longer then a day during the winter time

Climate data for Glomfjord, Nordland 1991-2020 (39 m)
Month	Jan	Feb	Mar	Apr	May	Jun	Jul	Aug	Sep	Oct	Nov	Dec	Year
Mean daily maximum °C (°F)	2.7 (36.9)	2 (36)	3.3 (37.9)	6.8 (44.2)	10.8 (51.4)	14.5 (58.1)	17.3 (63.1)	16.5 (61.7)	12.9 (55.2)	8 (46)	5.1 (41.2)	3.7 (38.7)	8.6 (47.5)
Daily mean °C (°F)	0 (32)	−0.5 (31.1)	0.5 (32.9)	3.6 (38.5)	7.6 (45.7)	11 (52)	13.8 (56.8)	13.2 (55.8)	9.9 (49.8)	5.6 (42.1)	2.8 (37.0)	1 (34)	5.7 (42.3)
Mean daily minimum °C (°F)	−2.1 (28.2)	−3 (27)	−2.1 (28.2)	0.9 (33.6)	4.5 (40.1)	8 (46)	10.9 (51.6)	10.5 (50.9)	7.4 (45.3)	3.4 (38.1)	0.7 (33.3)	−0.9 (30.4)	3.2 (37.7)
Average precipitation mm (inches)	214 (8.4)	166 (6.5)	201 (7.9)	126 (5.0)	118 (4.6)	121 (4.8)	120 (4.7)	149 (5.9)	244 (9.6)	251 (9.9)	195 (7.7)	239 (9.4)	2,144 (84.4)
Source 1: yr.no/met.no
Source 2: NOAA (average highs/lows)

Older climate normal

Climate data for Glomfjord, Nordland 1961-1990 (39 m)
Month	Jan	Feb	Mar	Apr	May	Jun	Jul	Aug	Sep	Oct	Nov	Dec	Year
Mean daily maximum °C (°F)	1.3 (34.3)	1.5 (34.7)	3.1 (37.6)	5.8 (42.4)	10.9 (51.6)	14.3 (57.7)	16.1 (61.0)	15.6 (60.1)	11.9 (53.4)	8.2 (46.8)	4.1 (39.4)	2.1 (35.8)	7.9 (46.2)
Daily mean °C (°F)	−1.3 (29.7)	−1.1 (30.0)	0.3 (32.5)	2.9 (37.2)	7.5 (45.5)	10.7 (51.3)	12.5 (54.5)	12.2 (54.0)	8.9 (48.0)	5.8 (42.4)	1.7 (35.1)	−0.4 (31.3)	5.0 (41.0)
Mean daily minimum °C (°F)	−3.9 (25.0)	−3.6 (25.5)	−2.4 (27.7)	0.2 (32.4)	4.5 (40.1)	7.7 (45.9)	9.9 (49.8)	9.6 (49.3)	6.4 (43.5)	3.5 (38.3)	−0.6 (30.9)	−2.8 (27.0)	2.4 (36.3)
Average precipitation mm (inches)	194 (7.6)	163 (6.4)	148 (5.8)	117 (4.6)	90 (3.5)	99 (3.9)	143 (5.6)	153 (6.0)	237 (9.3)	283 (11.1)	212 (8.3)	230 (9.1)	2,069 (81.2)
Average precipitation days (≥ 1 mm)	15.8	15.0	13.7	13.4	11.9	14.7	16.6	16.0	18.7	18.7	16.4	17.3	188.2
Source: eKlima

== Tourism ==
Glomfjord has two hotels, a bistro, a WaterLand (with one slide and two pools), a movie theatre, and some beautiful mountains for skiing and snowboarding in the winter. There are also tours for fishing, climbing, and other relaxing activities in the mountains during summer. Svartisen and the lake Storglomvatnet are tourist destinations that are near Glomfjord as well.
