= Glomfjorden =

Fjord in Meløy, Norway

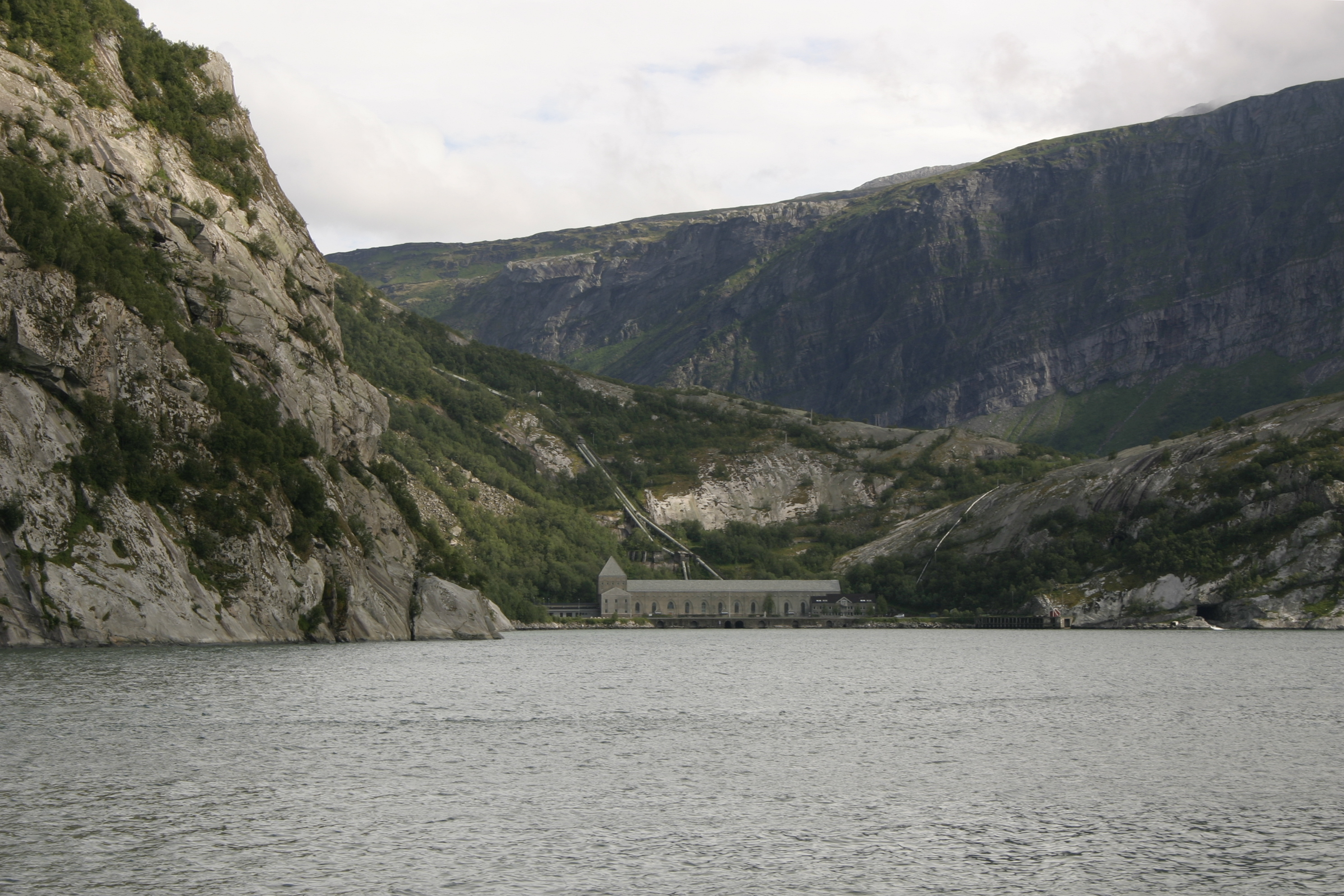
- View of the Glomfjord power plant along the fjord
- Interactive map of the fjord
- Location: Nordland county, Norway
- Coordinates: 66.8020°N 13.9703°E
- Type: Fjord
- Basin countries: Norway
- Max. length: 21 kilometres (13 mi)
- Max. width: 1 to 3 kilometres (0.62 to 1.86 mi)

Glomfjorden is a fjord in Meløy Municipality in Nordland county, Norway. The fjord is located just north of the Svartisen glacier between some very steep mountains that lie along the edges of the fjord. The villages of Glomfjord and Vassdalsvik are located along the fjord. The island of Messøya is located at the mouth of the fjord, near the village of Ørnes. The 21-kilometre (13 mi) long fjord is about 1 to 3 kilometres (0.62 to 1.86 mi) wide.

== See also ==
- List of Norwegian fjords
