= Åmøya =

Island in Nordland, Norway

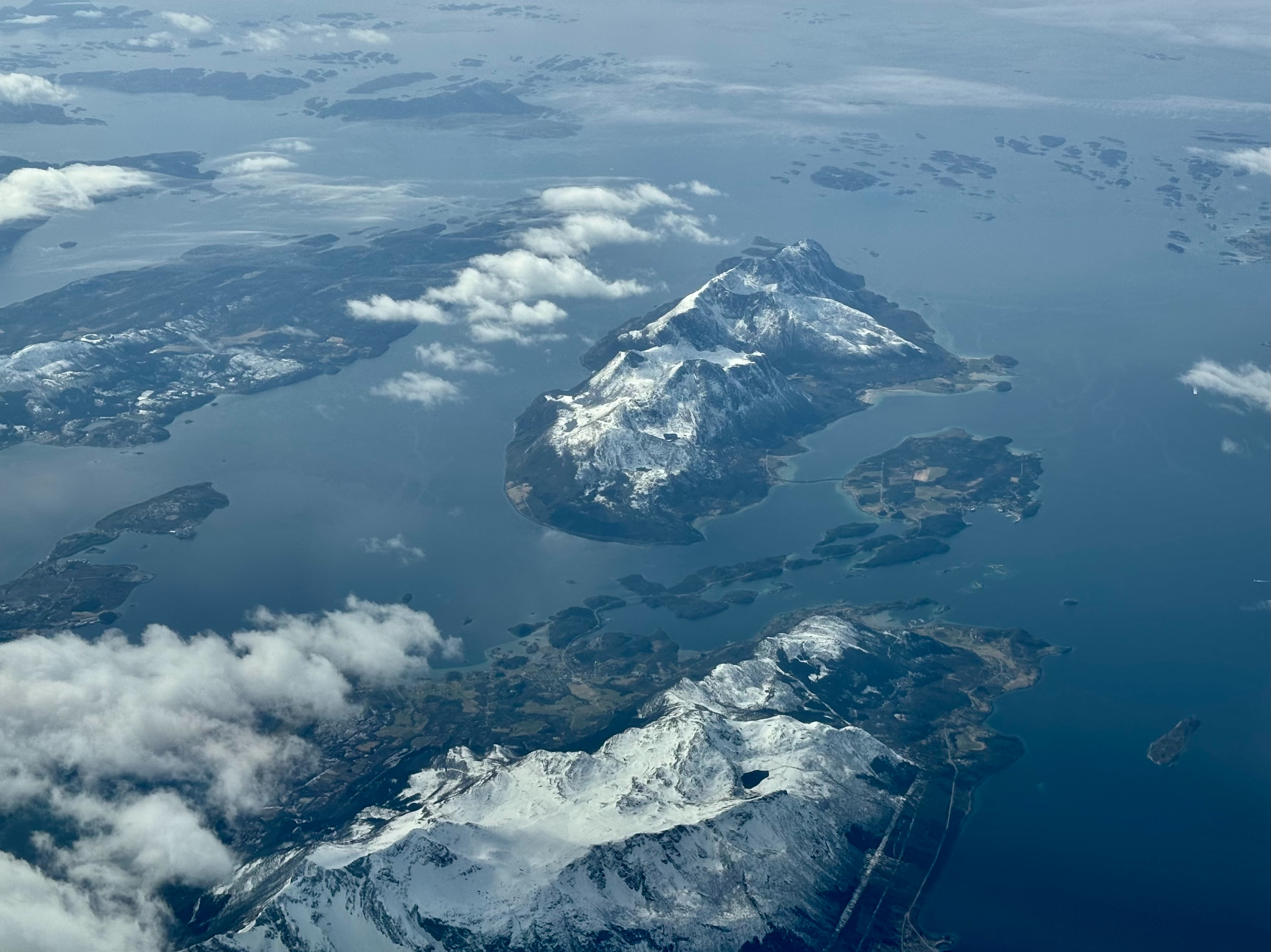
- Interactive map of Åmøya

Geography
- Location: Nordland, Norway
- Coordinates: 66.7700°N 13.3410°E
- Area: 23.4 km^{2} (9.0 sq mi)
- Length: 10 km (6 mi)
- Width: 4 km (2.5 mi)
- Highest elevation: 648 m (2126 ft)
- Highest point: Risnestinden

Administration
- Norway
- County: Nordland
- Municipality: Meløy Municipality

Demographics
- Population: 112 (2016)

Åmøya is an island in Meløy Municipality in Nordland county, Norway. The 23.4-square-kilometre (9.0 sq mi) island lies west of the mainland, east of the island of Bolga, and south of the island of Meløya. The island is connected to the mainland by a series of small bridges over the island of Grønnøya and several other small islands between Åmøya and the village of Engavågen on the mainland. The island is very mountainous, the highest mountain is the 648-metre (2,126 ft) Risnestinden. There were 112 residents living on the island in 2016.

== See also ==
- List of islands of Norway
