= Meløy Church =

Church in Nordland, Norway

- Meløy kirke
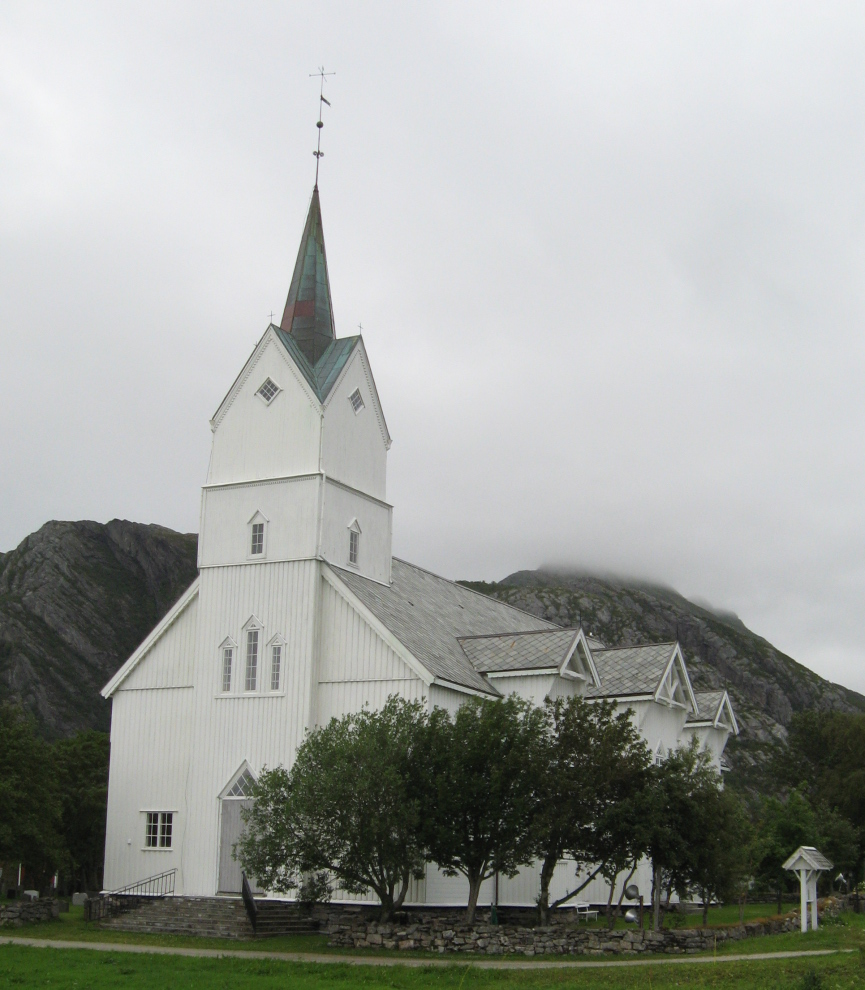
- View of the church
- Meløy Church
- 66.82349082°N 13.40649605°E
- Location: Meløy Municipality, Nordland
- Country: Norway
- Denomination: Church of Norway
- Churchmanship: Evangelical Lutheran

History
- Status: Parish church
- Founded: 14th century
- Consecrated: 23 July 1867

Architecture
- Functional status: Active
- Architect(s): H.A. Mosling and J.W. Nordan
- Architectural type: Long church
- Completed: 1867 (159 years ago)

Specifications
- Capacity: 600
- Materials: Wood

Administration
- Diocese: Sør-Hålogaland
- Deanery: Bodø domprosti
- Parish: Fore og Meløy
- Norwegian Cultural Heritage Site
- Type: Church
- Status: Automatically protected

Meløy Church (Norwegian: Meløy kirke) is a parish church of the Church of Norway in Meløy Municipality in Nordland county, Norway. It is located in the village of Meløy on the island of Meløya. It is one of the churches for the Fore og Meløy parish which is part of the Bodø domprosti (deanery) in the Diocese of Sør-Hålogaland. The white, wooden church was built in a long church style in 1867 using plans drawn up by the architects Håkon Mosling and Jacob Wilhelm Nordan. The church seats about 600 people, making it the second-largest wooden church in all of Northern Norway (after Vågan Church, the so-called Lofoten Cathedral).

== History ==
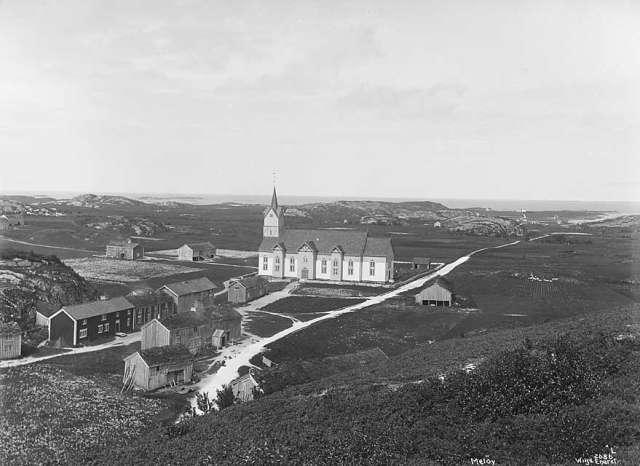

The earliest existing historical record about the church on the island of Meløya dates back to 1589, but the church was likely quite old by then. The church probably was built during the 14th century, since there are records that mention an existing parish of Meløy during the 1440s. In 1660, a new church was constructed beside the old church building and when the new church was completed, then the old church was demolished. Not much is known about the church. In January 1704, a lightning strike hit the church which caused a fire that burned the building to the ground. A new church was completed on the same site in 1711. It was a log building in a cruciform design with a steeple over the center.

In 1814, this church served as an election church (Norwegian: valgkirke). Together with more than 300 other parish churches across Norway, it was a polling station for elections to the 1814 Norwegian Constituent Assembly which wrote the Constitution of Norway. This was Norway's first national elections. Each church parish was a constituency that elected people called "electors" who later met together in each county to elect the representatives for the assembly that was to meet at Eidsvoll Manor later that year.

In 1864, construction on a new church just to the south of the old church was begun. The foundation wall was begun on 12 January 1864. The new church was completed in 1867 and it was consecrated on 23 July 1867. The older church was torn down in 1868. In 1940, electric lights were installed in the building.

== See also ==
- List of churches in Sør-Hålogaland
