= Støtt =

Islands in Meløy, Nordland, Norway

Støtt Støttvær
- Interactive map of Støtt; Støttvær

Geography
- Location: Nordland, Norway
- Coordinates: 66°55′07″N 13°24′22″E

Administration
- Norway
- County: Nordland
- Municipality: Meløy Municipality

Støtt is a group of islands in Meløy Municipality in Nordland county, Norway. The islands lie about 10 kilometres (6.2 mi) northwest of the mainland village of Reipå. The main islands of Støtt include the 1.6-square-kilometre (0.62 sq mi) Svenningen, the 2.7-square-kilometre (1.0 sq mi) Innerstøtt, and the 1.4-square-kilometre (0.54 sq mi) Helløya. There are also many other uninhabited smaller islands and skerries surrounding the main islands. Innerstøtt and Svenningen are inhabited and they are connected to each other by bridges. There were 27 residents in Støtt in 2017. There is a car ferry from Innerstøtt to the mainland village of Ørnes. The two inhabited islands are also referred to as the village of Støtt.

The Støttværet nature reserve includes the island of Helløya and a number of smaller islands, islets and skerries that encircle the three inhabited islands in the archipelago in the north, west, and southwest.

== See also ==
- List of islands of Norway
