= Ørnes =

Village in Meløy Municipality, Norway

- Village
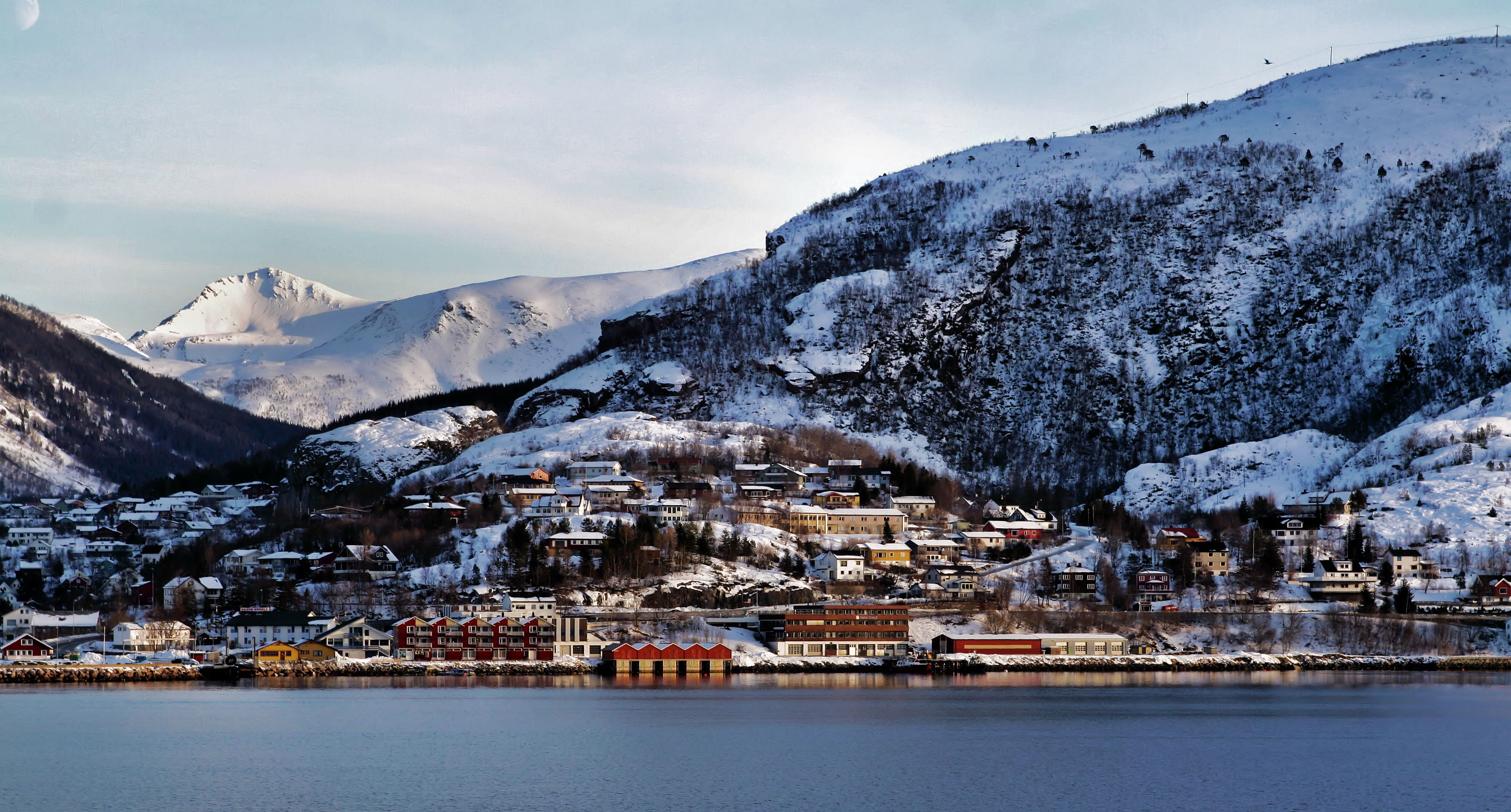
- View of the village in winter
- Interactive map of Ørnes
- Location within Nordland Location within Norway
- Coordinates: 66.8688°N 13.7058°E
- Country: Norway
- Region: Northern Norway
- County: Nordland
- District: Salten
- Municipality: Meløy Municipality

Area
  - Total: 1.56 km^{2} (0.60 sq mi)
- Elevation: 12 m (39 ft)

Population (2023)
  - Total: 1,684
  - Density: 1,079/km^{2} (2,790/sq mi)
- Time zone: UTC+01:00 (CET)
  - Summer (DST): UTC+02:00 (CEST)
- Post Code: 8150 Ørnes

Ørnes is the administrative centre of Meløy Municipality in Nordland county, Norway. It is located along Norwegian County Road 17, about 6 kilometres (3.7 mi) south of the village of Reipå and about 5 kilometres (3.1 mi) north of the village of Eidbukta. The island of Mesøya lies just west of the village. Ørnes is a port of call along the Hurtigruten ferry route between Nesna and Bodø.

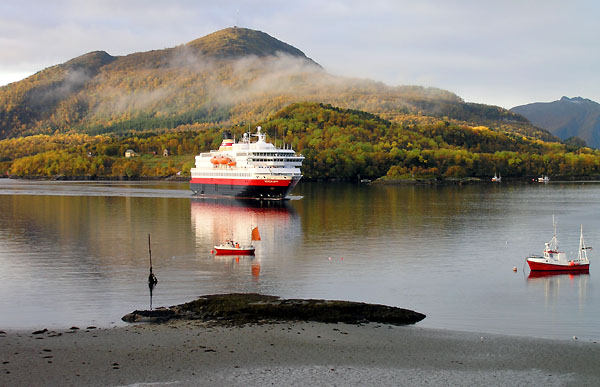
The Hurtigruten ship MS Nordkapp at Ørnes in late September

The 1.56-square-kilometre (390-acre) village has a population (2023) of 1,684 and a population density of 1,079 inhabitants per square kilometre (2,790/sq mi).

The newspapers Framtia and Meløyavisa are published in Ørnes.

Ørnes Church is located in the village, serving central Meløy. In this part of Northern Norway, temperatures can drop down quite low in the winter and the summers can be slightly mild. The lakes Lysvatnet and Markavatnet both lie to the northeast of the village.

== History ==
The old farm of Ørnes is mentioned in documents dating from 1610 when a tenant farmer lived here. The village (which grew up at the old farm site) can be traced back hundreds of years, but the year 1794 is recognized as the beginning of Ørnes, when Elling Pedersen, a member of the noble Benkestok family from Meløya was allowed to set up an inn and trading post at the place. He lived at Meløya but when he died in 1802, his widow moved to Ørnes and continued trading. The business changed owners within the Benkestok family but was continued by others when the old family died out. These would typically combine trading with shipping. The settlement was ravaged by fire several times, but some of the original buildings from approx. 1800 remain intact; several dwellings, fishermen's cabins, boathouses, barns and a forge are kept in good condition and several are listed and protected.
