= Meløy Municipality =

Municipality in Nordland, Norway

Meløy Municipality Meløy kommune
- Municipality
- Melø herred (historic name)
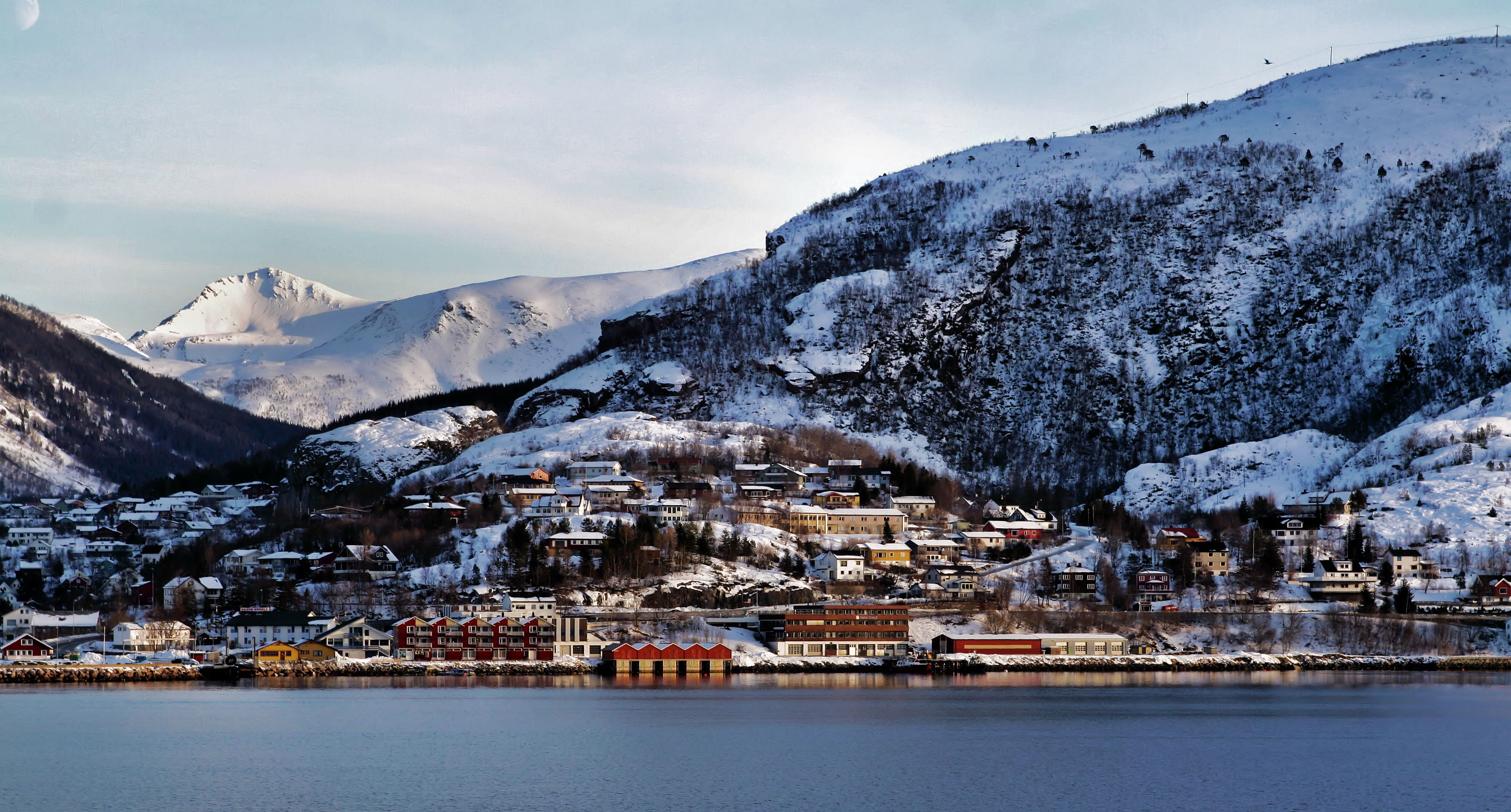
- View of Ørnes in winter

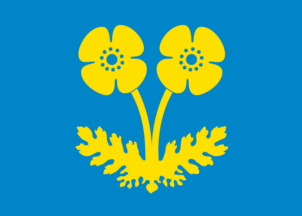
- Flag Coat of arms

- Nordland within Norway

- Meløy within Nordland
- Coordinates: 66°47′17″N 13°40′33″E
- Country: Norway
- County: Nordland
- District: Salten
- Established: 1 Jan 1884
  - Preceded by: Rødøy Municipality
- Administrative centre: Ørnes

Government
  - Mayor (2015): Sigurd Stormo (Ap)

Area
  - Total: 873.83 km^{2} (337.39 sq mi)
  - Land: 798.02 km^{2} (308.12 sq mi)
  - Water: 75.81 km^{2} (29.27 sq mi) 8.7%
  - Rank: #133 in Norway
- Highest elevation: 1,636.81 m (5,370.1 ft)

Population (2024)
  - Total: 6,180
  - Rank: #157 in Norway
  - Density: 7.1/km^{2} (18/sq mi)
  - Change (10 years): ▼ −4.8%
- Demonym: Meløyfjerding

Official language
  - Norwegian form: Bokmål
- Time zone: UTC+01:00 (CET)
  - Summer (DST): UTC+02:00 (CEST)
- ISO 3166 code: NO-1837
- Website: Official website

Meløy is a municipality in Nordland county, Norway. It is part of the Salten traditional region. The administrative centre of the municipality is the village of Ørnes. Other villages include Eidbukt, Neverdal, Glomfjord, Halsa, Reipå, Støtt, and Ågskardet.

The municipality is situated just to the north of the Arctic Circle on Norway's west coast. It encompasses the island of Meløya and some 700 other islands of various sizes around the Meløyfjorden, Glomfjorden, and Holandsfjorden in the south, along with a stretch of mainland coast.

The 874-square-kilometre (337 sq mi) municipality is the 133rd largest by area out of the 357 municipalities in Norway. Meløy Municipality is the 157th most populous municipality in Norway with a population of 6,180. The municipality's population density is 7.1 inhabitants per square kilometre (18/sq mi) and its population has decreased by 4.8% over the previous 10-year period.

== General information ==
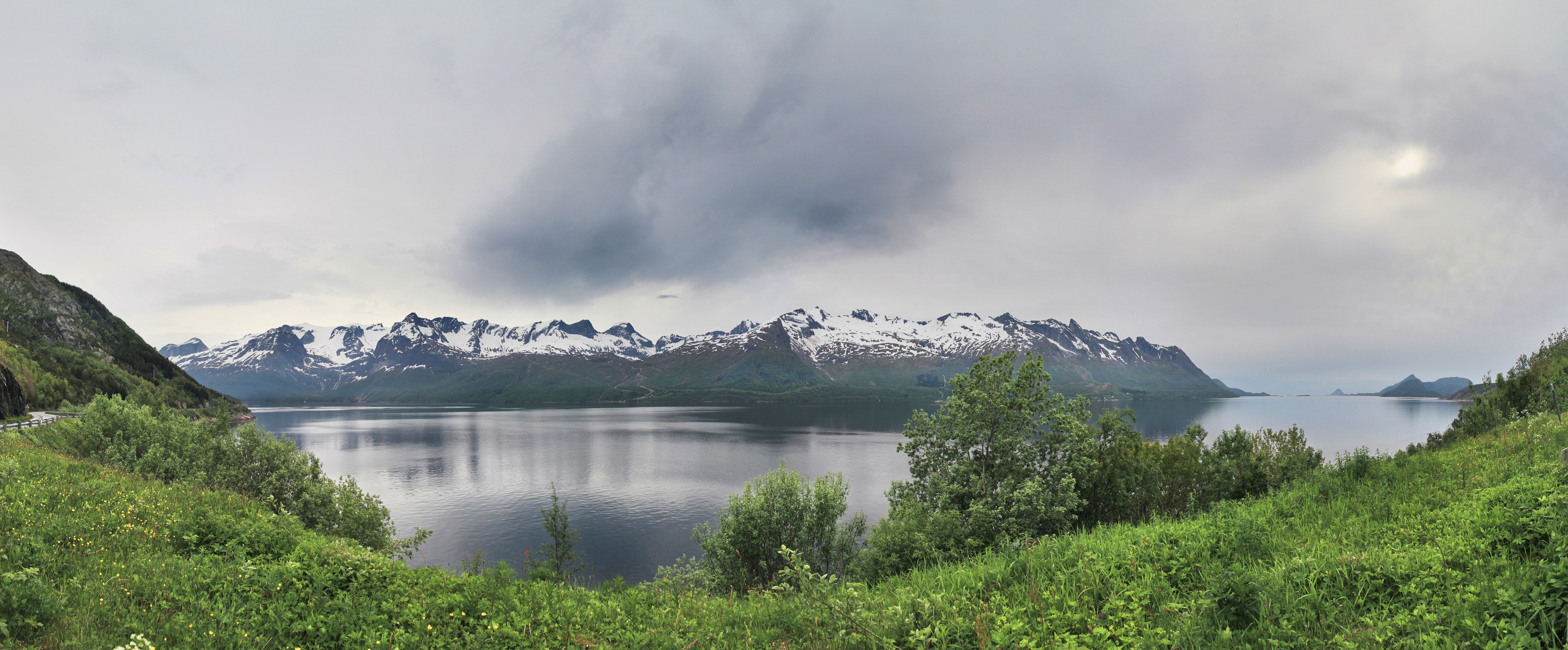
View of the Glomfjorden

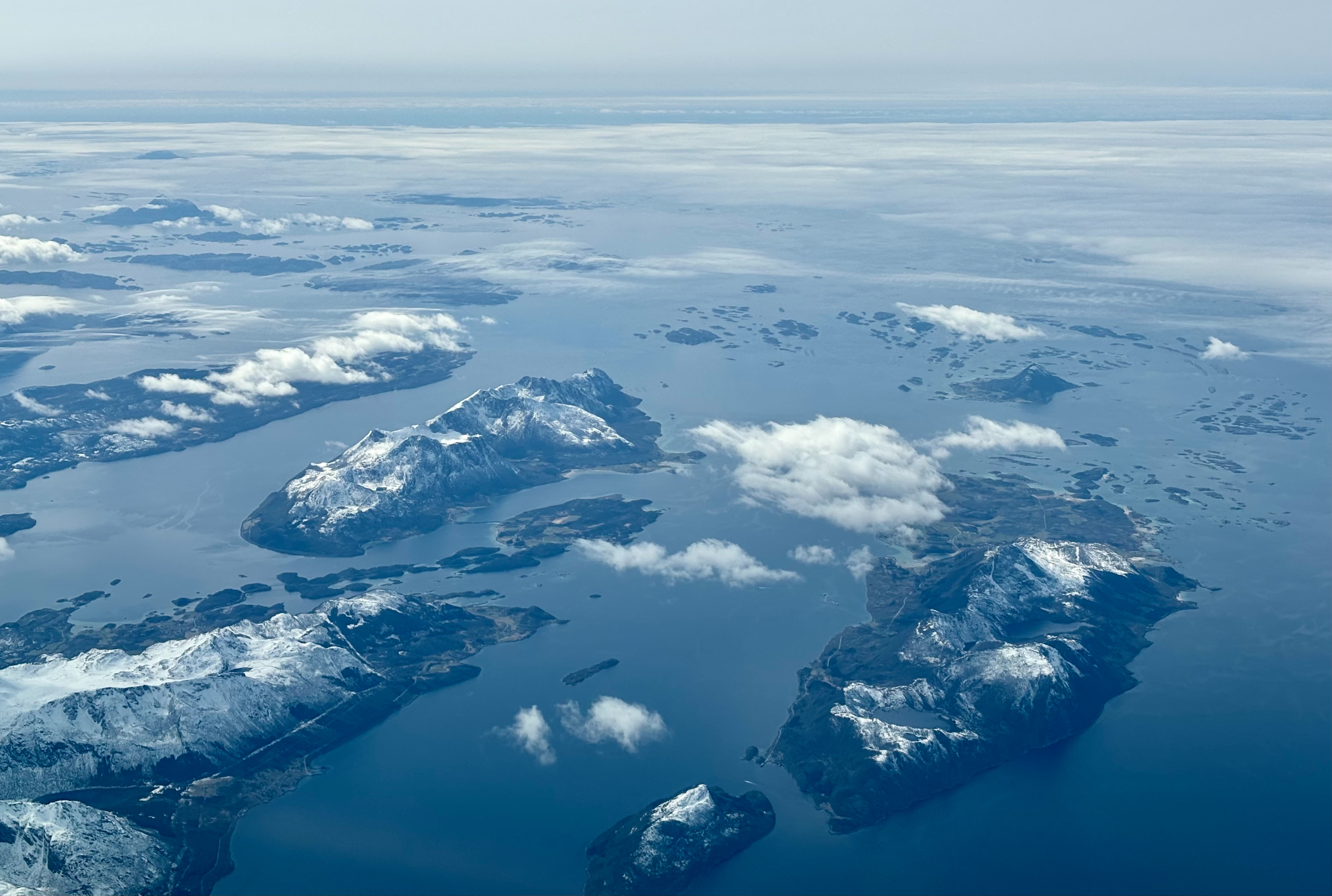
Aerial view of the islands of the area

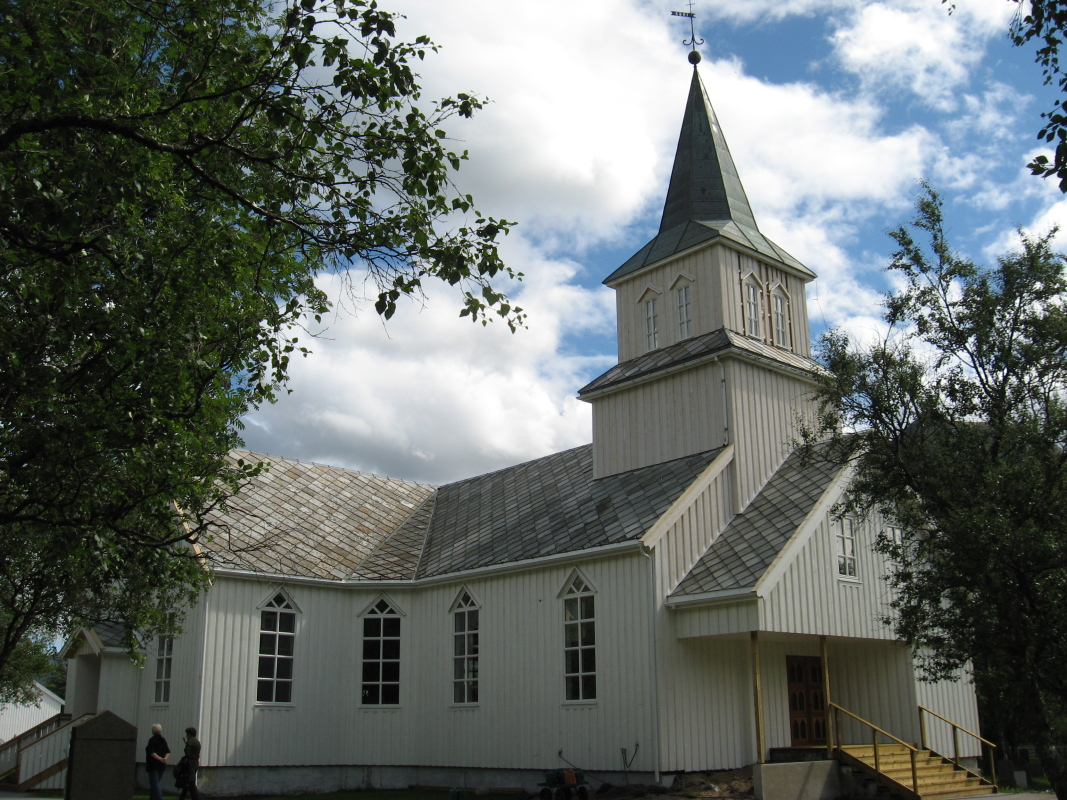
Fore Church

The municipality of Meløy was established on 1 January 1884 when the large Rødøy Municipality was divided into two: Rødøy Municipality (population: 1,945) in the south and Meløy Municipality (population: 2,696) in the north. The municipal borders have not changed since then.

=== Name ===
The municipality (originally the parish) is named after the island of Meløya (Old Norse: Mjǫlva) since the first Meløy Church was built there. The first element comes from the word mjǫl which means "flour" or "meal" (referring to fine sand on the beaches of the island). The last element (which was added to the name around the year 1500) is øy which means "island". Historically, the name of the municipality was spelled Melø. On 6 January 1908, a royal resolution changed the spelling of the name of the municipality to Meløy.

=== Coat of arms ===
The coat of arms was granted on 7 December 1984. The official blazon is "Azure, a poppy plant Or" (Norwegian: I blått en gull valmueplante). This means the arms have a blue field (background) and the charge is a subspecies of the arctic poppy plant locally known as Svartisvalmue (Papaver radicatum subglobosum). The poppy plant has a tincture of Or which means it is commonly colored yellow, but if it is made out of metal, then gold is used. The municipality is located near the second largest glacier in continental Norway, the Svartisen (black ice), and the plant is one of the plants found growing closest to the ice. The colors symbolize the blue glacial ice and the yellow flowers. The arms were designed by Rolf Tidemann after the original ideda by Knut Sørensen.

=== Churches ===
The Church of Norway has three parishes (sokn) within Meløy Municipality. It is part of the Bodø domprosti (arch-deanery) in the Diocese of Sør-Hålogaland.

Churches in Meløy Municipality
Parish (sokn)	Church name	Location of the church	Year built
Fore og Meløy	Fore Church	Reipå	1909
Fore og Meløy	Meløy Church	Meløya	1867
Fore og Meløy	Ørnes Church	Ørnes	1990
Glomfjord	Glomfjord Church	Glomfjord	1957
Halsa	Halsa Church	Halsa	1960

== History ==
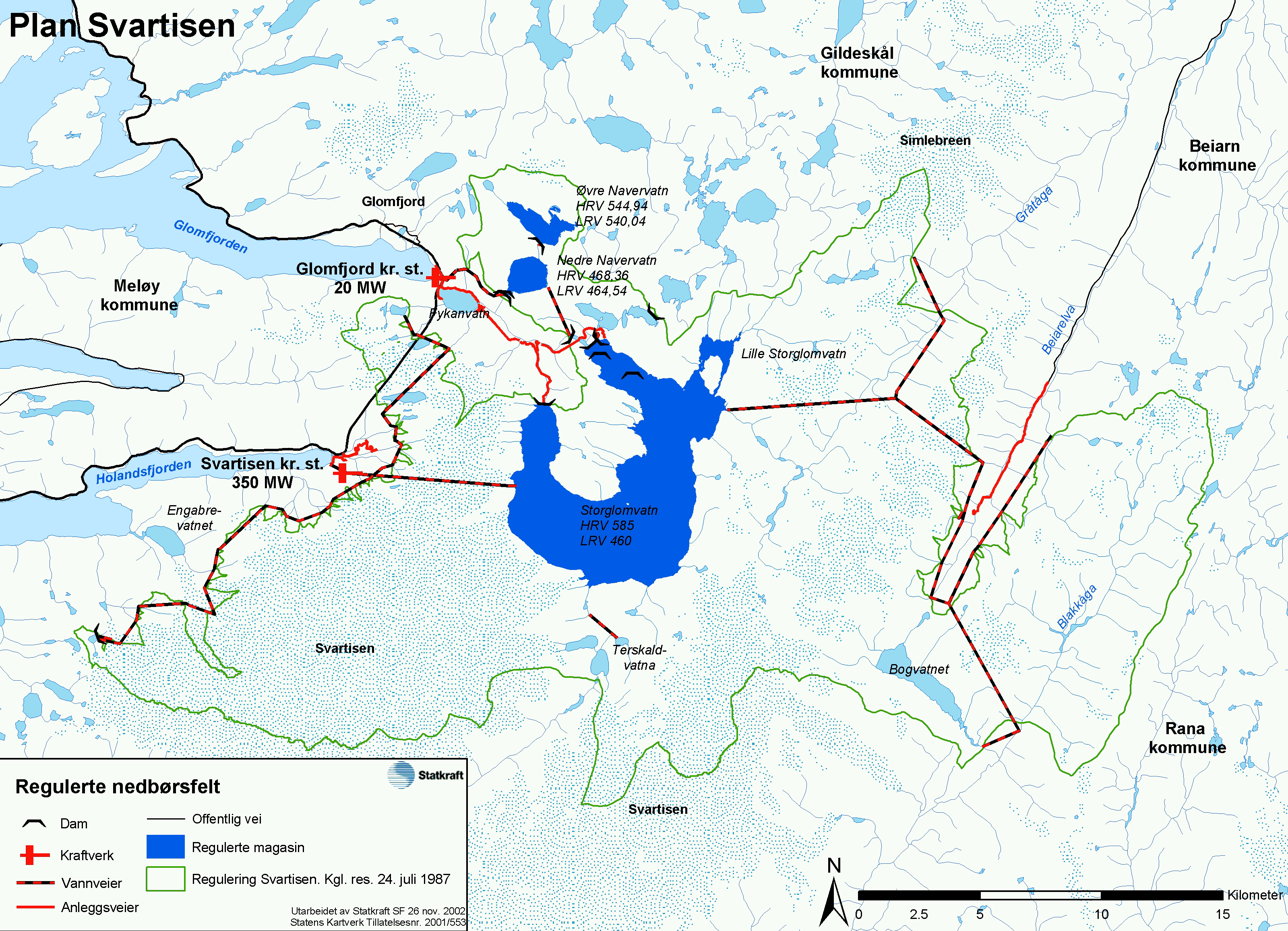
Water is collected from Svartisen to produce hydropower.

Meløy has been inhabited for many centuries and still possesses various relics from the Viking Age. The Benkestok family, one of Norway's original noble families, established one of its seats at Meløy gård (farm) on the island of Meløya in the 16th century.

Due to the expansion of the population during the 19th century, the area of Meløy was split from its southern neighbour, Rødøy Municipality, in 1884. Its administrative centre was originally on Meløya, but it was later moved to the mainland coastal village of Ørnes. Ørnes is one of the stops on the route of the Hurtigruten (coastal express boat), with a notably scenic entrance via the fjord.

The second largest glacier in Norway, Svartisen, is a target for passenger visits. The mountains around Glomfjord are popular for fishing and hunting as well as skiing in the winter time.

== Government ==
Meløy Municipality is responsible for primary education (through 10th grade), outpatient health services, senior citizen services, welfare and other social services, zoning, economic development, and municipal roads and utilities. The municipality is governed by a municipal council of directly elected representatives. The mayor is indirectly elected by a vote of the municipal council. The municipality is under the jurisdiction of the Salten og Lofoten District Court and the Hålogaland Court of Appeal.

=== Municipal council ===
The municipal council (Kommunestyre) of Meløy Municipality is made up of 23 representatives that are elected to four year terms. The tables below show the current and historical composition of the council by political party.

Meløy kommunestyre 2023–2027
Party name (in Norwegian)	Number of representatives
Labour Party (Arbeiderpartiet)	4
Progress Party (Fremskrittspartiet)	5
Conservative Party (Høyre)	3
Christian Democratic Party (Kristelig Folkeparti)	1
Centre Party (Senterpartiet)	4
Socialist Left Party (Sosialistisk Venstreparti)	2
Liberal Party (Venstre)	2
Meløy Free Voters (Meløy Frie Folkevalgte)	2
Total number of members:	23

Meløy kommunestyre 2019–2023
Party name (in Norwegian)	Number of representatives
Labour Party (Arbeiderpartiet)	8
Progress Party (Fremskrittspartiet)	2
Conservative Party (Høyre)	3
Christian Democratic Party (Kristelig Folkeparti)	1
Centre Party (Senterpartiet)	6
Socialist Left Party (Sosialistisk Venstreparti)	1
Liberal Party (Venstre)	2
Total number of members:	23

Meløy kommunestyre 2015–2019
Party name (in Norwegian)	Number of representatives
Labour Party (Arbeiderpartiet)	7
Progress Party (Fremskrittspartiet)	3
Conservative Party (Høyre)	5
Christian Democratic Party (Kristelig Folkeparti)	2
Centre Party (Senterpartiet)	4
Socialist Left Party (Sosialistisk Venstreparti)	1
Liberal Party (Venstre)	1
Total number of members:	23

Meløy kommunestyre 2011–2015
Party name (in Norwegian)	Number of representatives
Labour Party (Arbeiderpartiet)	6
Progress Party (Fremskrittspartiet)	4
Conservative Party (Høyre)	8
Christian Democratic Party (Kristelig Folkeparti)	2
Centre Party (Senterpartiet)	3
Socialist Left Party (Sosialistisk Venstreparti)	1
Liberal Party (Venstre)	1
Total number of members:	25

Meløy kommunestyre 2007–2011
Party name (in Norwegian)	Number of representatives
Labour Party (Arbeiderpartiet)	9
Progress Party (Fremskrittspartiet)	4
Conservative Party (Høyre)	5
Christian Democratic Party (Kristelig Folkeparti)	2
Centre Party (Senterpartiet)	2
Socialist Left Party (Sosialistisk Venstreparti)	2
Liberal Party (Venstre)	1
Common list (Samlingslista)	2
Total number of members:	27

Meløy kommunestyre 2003–2007
Party name (in Norwegian)	Number of representatives
Labour Party (Arbeiderpartiet)	7
Progress Party (Fremskrittspartiet)	3
Conservative Party (Høyre)	5
Christian Democratic Party (Kristelig Folkeparti)	2
Coastal Party (Kystpartiet)	2
Centre Party (Senterpartiet)	3
Socialist Left Party (Sosialistisk Venstreparti)	4
Liberal Party (Venstre)	1
Total number of members:	27

Meløy kommunestyre 1999–2003
Party name (in Norwegian)	Number of representatives
Labour Party (Arbeiderpartiet)	10
Progress Party (Fremskrittspartiet)	1
Conservative Party (Høyre)	6
Christian Democratic Party (Kristelig Folkeparti)	3
Coastal Party (Kystpartiet)	3
Centre Party (Senterpartiet)	5
Socialist Left Party (Sosialistisk Venstreparti)	2
Liberal Party (Venstre)	1
Total number of members:	31

Meløy kommunestyre 1995–1999
Party name (in Norwegian)	Number of representatives
Labour Party (Arbeiderpartiet)	10
Conservative Party (Høyre)	8
Christian Democratic Party (Kristelig Folkeparti)	4
Centre Party (Senterpartiet)	10
Socialist Left Party (Sosialistisk Venstreparti)	2
Liberal Party (Venstre)	1
Total number of members:	35

Meløy kommunestyre 1991–1995
Party name (in Norwegian)	Number of representatives
Labour Party (Arbeiderpartiet)	12
Conservative Party (Høyre)	10
Christian Democratic Party (Kristelig Folkeparti)	3
Centre Party (Senterpartiet)	4
Socialist Left Party (Sosialistisk Venstreparti)	5
Liberal Party (Venstre)	1
Total number of members:	35

Meløy kommunestyre 1987–1991
Party name (in Norwegian)	Number of representatives
Labour Party (Arbeiderpartiet)	14
Conservative Party (Høyre)	14
Christian Democratic Party (Kristelig Folkeparti)	3
Centre Party (Senterpartiet)	1
Socialist Left Party (Sosialistisk Venstreparti)	2
Liberal Party (Venstre)	1
Total number of members:	35

Meløy kommunestyre 1983–1987
Party name (in Norwegian)	Number of representatives
Labour Party (Arbeiderpartiet)	15
Conservative Party (Høyre)	11
Christian Democratic Party (Kristelig Folkeparti)	4
Centre Party (Senterpartiet)	1
Socialist Left Party (Sosialistisk Venstreparti)	2
Liberal Party (Venstre)	2
Total number of members:	35

Meløy kommunestyre 1979–1983
Party name (in Norwegian)	Number of representatives
Labour Party (Arbeiderpartiet)	13
Conservative Party (Høyre)	11
Christian Democratic Party (Kristelig Folkeparti)	5
Centre Party (Senterpartiet)	2
Socialist Left Party (Sosialistisk Venstreparti)	2
Liberal Party (Venstre)	2
Total number of members:	35

Meløy kommunestyre 1975–1979
Party name (in Norwegian)	Number of representatives
Labour Party (Arbeiderpartiet)	13
Conservative Party (Høyre)	7
Christian Democratic Party (Kristelig Folkeparti)	6
Centre Party (Senterpartiet)	2
Socialist Left Party (Sosialistisk Venstreparti)	2
Liberal Party (Venstre)	2
Glomfjord list (Glomfjordlisten)	1
Free voters (Frie Velgere)	2
Total number of members:	35

Meløy kommunestyre 1971–1975
Party name (in Norwegian)	Number of representatives
Labour Party (Arbeiderpartiet)	15
Conservative Party (Høyre)	5
Christian Democratic Party (Kristelig Folkeparti)	5
Centre Party (Senterpartiet)	4
Liberal Party (Venstre)	2
Local List(s) (Lokale lister)	2
Socialist common list (Venstresosialistiske felleslister)	2
Total number of members:	35

Meløy kommunestyre 1967–1971
Party name (in Norwegian)	Number of representatives
Labour Party (Arbeiderpartiet)	14
Conservative Party (Høyre)	5
Christian Democratic Party (Kristelig Folkeparti)	3
Centre Party (Senterpartiet)	3
Socialist People's Party (Sosialistisk Folkeparti)	3
Liberal Party (Venstre)	2
Local List(s) (Lokale lister)	5
Total number of members:	35

Meløy kommunestyre 1963–1967
Party name (in Norwegian)	Number of representatives
Labour Party (Arbeiderpartiet)	11
Communist Party (Kommunistiske Parti)	1
Christian Democratic Party (Kristelig Folkeparti)	4
Socialist People's Party (Sosialistisk Folkeparti)	1
Joint List(s) of Non-Socialist Parties (Borgerlige Felleslister)	7
Local List(s) (Lokale lister)	3
Total number of members:	27

Meløy herredsstyre 1959–1963
Party name (in Norwegian)	Number of representatives
Labour Party (Arbeiderpartiet)	9
Communist Party (Kommunistiske Parti)	2
Joint List(s) of Non-Socialist Parties (Borgerlige Felleslister)	15
Local List(s) (Lokale lister)	1
Total number of members:	27

Meløy herredsstyre 1955–1959
Party name (in Norwegian)	Number of representatives
Labour Party (Arbeiderpartiet)	10
Communist Party (Kommunistiske Parti)	3
Joint List(s) of Non-Socialist Parties (Borgerlige Felleslister)	12
Local List(s) (Lokale lister)	2
Total number of members:	27

Meløy herredsstyre 1951–1955
Party name (in Norwegian)	Number of representatives
Labour Party (Arbeiderpartiet)	5
Communist Party (Kommunistiske Parti)	2
Christian Democratic Party (Kristelig Folkeparti)	2
Local List(s) (Lokale lister)	11
Total number of members:	20

Meløy herredsstyre 1947–1951
Party name (in Norwegian)	Number of representatives
Labour Party (Arbeiderpartiet)	6
Communist Party (Kommunistiske Parti)	2
List of workers, fishermen, and small farmholders (Arbeidere, fiskere, småbrukere liste)	1
Joint List(s) of Non-Socialist Parties (Borgerlige Felleslister)	11
Total number of members:	20

Meløy herredsstyre 1945–1947
Party name (in Norwegian)	Number of representatives
Labour Party (Arbeiderpartiet)	6
Communist Party (Kommunistiske Parti)	3
Local List(s) (Lokale lister)	11
Total number of members:	20

Meløy herredsstyre 1937–1941*
Party name (in Norwegian)	Number of representatives
Labour Party (Arbeiderpartiet)	9
Communist Party (Kommunistiske Parti)	1
List of workers, fishermen, and small farmholders (Arbeidere, fiskere, småbrukere liste)	1
Joint List(s) of Non-Socialist Parties (Borgerlige Felleslister)	4
Local List(s) (Lokale lister)	5
Total number of members:	20
Note: Due to the German occupation of Norway during World War II, no elections were held for new municipal councils until after the war ended in 1945.

=== Mayors ===
The mayor (Norwegian: ordfører) of Meløy Municipality is the political leader of the municipality and the chairperson of the municipal council. Here is a list of people who have held this position:

- 1884–1904: Ole P. Dahl
- 1904–1908: Peder A. Thostrup
- 1908–1910: Fredrik Meyer
- 1911–1913: Conrad Helgesen
- 1914–1916: Fredrik Meyer
- 1917–1920: Ludvig Daae
- 1920–1934: Christian Edvard Tidemann
- 1935–1937: Martin Kvalnes (H)
- 1938–1940: Martinus Nystad (Ap)
- 1941–1942: Martin Kvalnes (H)
- 1943–1945: Johan Kristensen
- 1945–1951: Martinus Nystad (Ap)
- 1952–1953: Ole Bang
- 1953–1963: Anton Henrik Swensen
- 1964–1968: Karl L. Kildal (KrF)
- 1968–1975: Ole Hillestad (Ap)
- 1975–1991: Konrad Fjellgård (H)
- 1991–1993: Tor Schiller Lekanger (H)
- 1994–1999: Fredrik Gransjøen (Sp)
- 1999–2003: Oddleiv Roald Torsvik (H)
- 2003–2011: Arild Kjerpeseth (Ap)
- 2011–2015: Per Swensen (H)
- 2015–present: Sigurd Stormo (Ap)

== Geography ==
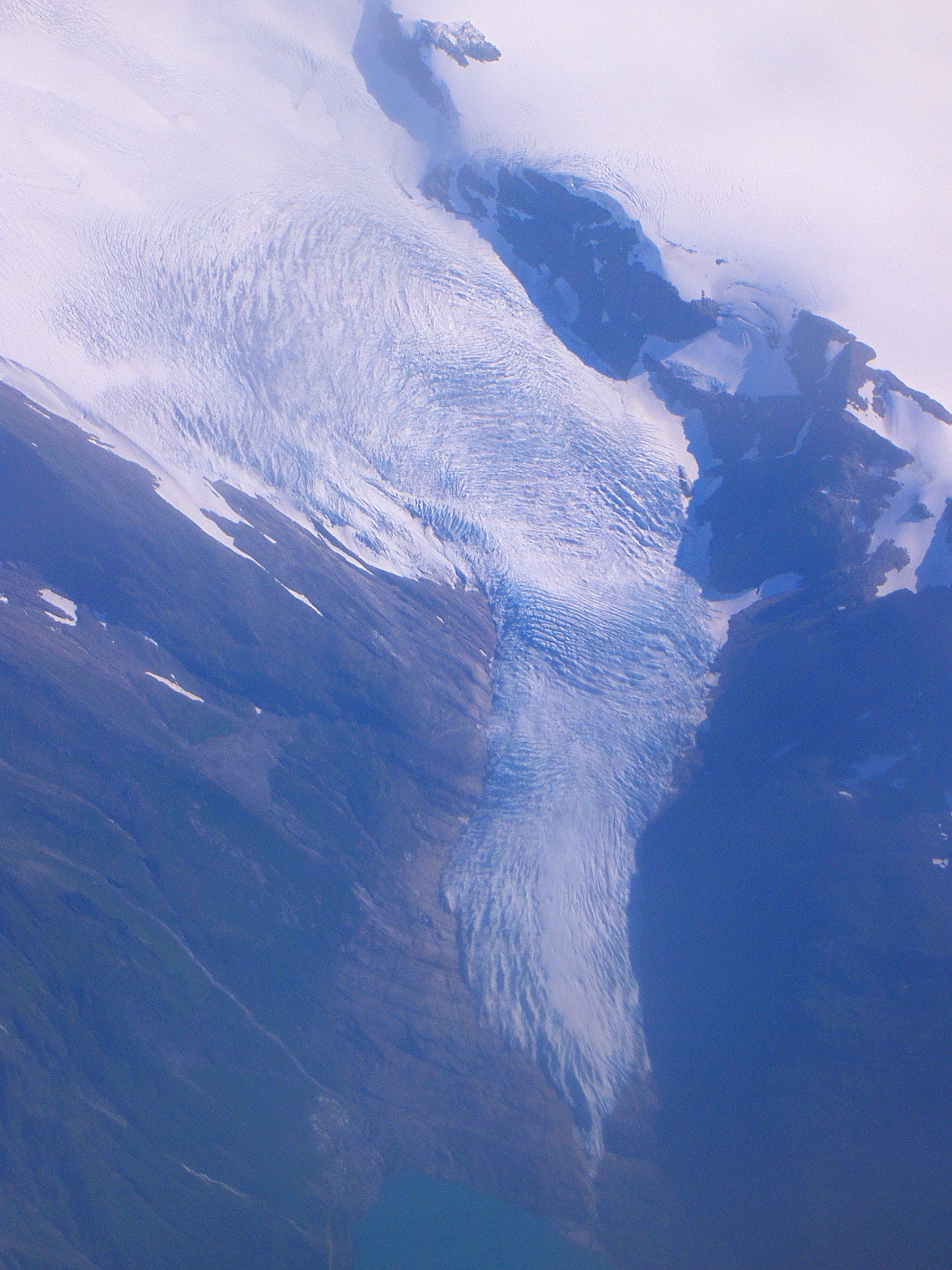
Engabreen (glacier) seen from above as it stretches down towards Holandsfjord

The municipality of Meløy is a coastal community that includes many of the surrounding islands. Many parts of the mainland were fairly isolated until road tunnels were built during the 20th century that connected them to the rest of Norway. Some of the main islands of Meløy are Åmøya, Meløya, Bolga, Mesøya, Grønøya, and Støtt. Åmøya is connected to the mainland via the Brattsund Bridge. The other islands are all accessible by boat or ferry only. The Kalsholmen Lighthouse is located in the southwestern part of the municipality.

The Vestfjorden passes Meløy in the northwest, and the Meløyfjorden, Glomfjorden, and Holandsfjorden cut into the mainland from the west. The Saltfjellet–Svartisen National Park is located in the southeast in the Saltfjellet mountain range, surrounding the Svartisen glacier. The highest point in the municipality is the 1,636.81-metre (5,370.1 ft) tall mountain Skjelåtinden, on the border with Beiarn Municipality.

=== Farms of Meløy ===
Historically, the land of Meløy was divided up into named farms. These farms were used in census and tax records and are useful for genealogical research.

Meløy municipality, tellingskrets 1-8 from 1920 census
Tellingskrets (enumeration districts): 1, Bolga (lime); 2, Åmnes (black); 3, Herstad (blue); 4, Aag (purple); 5, Holand (green); 6, Sneland (red); 7, Halsa; (teal) 8, Bjerangen (gray). List of farms:
1 1: Smyen
2 2: Bolga
3 77: Kalsholm fyr
4 4: Tind
5 5: Kjørhaugvik
6 6: Vikvoll
7 7: Åmnes
8 8: Stavnes
9 39: Grønøy
10 9: Skaret
11 10: Herstad
12 3: Voldvik
13 17: Rendalsvik
14 18: Fondal
15 19: Engen
16 22: Brasett
17 23: Sommerseth
18 24: Aspnes
19 20: Myrvold
20 21: Storvik
21 25: Skålsvik
22 26: Halsa
23 27: Æsøy
24 28: Slætan
25 29: Grønaas
26 30: Breivik
27 31: Bjerangen
28 Halsa kirke (church), built 1960
Meløy municipality, tellingskrets 9-16
Tellingskrets (enumeration districts): 9, Enga (lime); 10, Vasdal (teal); 11, Glomfjorden (blue); 12, Øbugt (purple); 13, Spildra (green); 14, Nordbygden (red); 15, Stol (black); 16, Meløy (gray). List of farms:
1 32: Kjeldal
2 33: Angelsheim
3 34: Oldra
4 35: Saura
5 36: Osa
6 37: Enga
7 38: Valla
8 40: Fokeng
9 41: Jenslund
10 42: Vasdal
11 43: Sandvik
12 45: Glommen
13 46: Hugvik
14 44: Reindalen
15 48: Selstad
16 49: Næverdal
17 50: Saudå
18 51: Øbugt, nedre
19 52: Øbugt, yttre
20 53: Borvik
21 54: Vollvik
22 84: Silvik
23 85: Balsethvandet
24 86: Rauseth
25 55: Korsnes
26 56: Spildra øvre
27 57: Spilderdalen
28 58: Digermulen
29 59: Vinterveien
30 60: Djupvik
31 61: Mosvoll
32 62: Løvset
33 63: Torsvik
34 64: Gjerset
35 65: Teksmo
36 83: Mesøy
37 66: Stien
38 67: Ronemoen
39 68: Sør Fore
40 69: Sæterenget
41 70: Dalen
42 71: Kleiven
43 72: Kunna
44 73: Støtt
45 74: Gaasvær
46 75: Otervær
47 76: Skagen
48 77: Meløysjøen
49 78: Vanvik
50 79: Røshagen
51 80: Fagervik
52 81: Risvik
53 82: Meløsund
54 87: Skjærpvik
55 Meløy kirke (church), built 1867
56 Fore kirke (church), built 1909
57 Ørnes kirke (church), built 1990
58 Glomfjord kirke (church), built 1957

Coordinates on the maps are approximate. Each map has a maximum number of listings it can display, so the map has been divided into parts consistent with the enumeration districts (Norwegian: tellingskrets) in the 1920 census of Norway. This map will include one farm name per farm number; other farm names or subdivision numbers may exist.

==== Farm names and numbers ====
Following are the farms in the Meløy municipality, as they are listed in O. Rygh's series Norske Gaardnavne (lit. 'Norwegian farm names'), the Nordland volume of which was published in 1905.

See also: Digital version of Norske Gaardnavne - Nordland (in Norwegian)

The farm numbers are used in some census records, and numbers that are near each other indicate that those farms are geographically proximate. Handwritten Norwegian sources, particularly those prior to 1800, may use variants on these names. For recorded variants before 1723, see the digital version of O. Rygh. Note that the 1920 census records mapped above may not match O. Rygh.

Farm names were often used as part of Norwegian names, in addition to the person's given name and patronymic or inherited surname. Some families retained the farm name, or toponymic, as a surname when they emigrated, so in those cases tracing a surname may tell you specifically where in Norway the family was from. This tradition began to change in the mid to late 19th century, and inherited surnames were codified into law in 1923.

Farm Name	Farm Number
Sneen	1
Bolgen	2
Harfjeld	3
Harfjeldstrand	4
Kjørhaugvik	5
Kjørhaug	6
Aamnes	7
Stavnes	8
Skaret	9
Herstad	10
Haugvik søndre	11
Aabotsvik	12
Engevik	13
Aag	14
Korsvik	15
Arhaug	16
Rendalsvik	17
Fondalen	18
Fonnøren	19
Snelandslien	20
Holand	21
Braset	22
Sommersæt	23
Skaalsvik, 1	24
Skaalsvik, 2	25
Halsa	26
Æsøen	27
Forøen	27, 2
Halsosen	28
Grønaasen	29
Breivik	30
Bjærangen	31
Kjeldal, 1	32
Kjeldal, 2	33
Oldra	34
Saura	35
Osa	36
Enga	37
Valla nedre	38
Grønøen	39
Valla øvre	40
Jenslund	41
Vasdal	42
Sandvik	43
Reindalen	44
Glommen	45
Haugvik nordre	46
Sætvik	47
Selstad	48
Næverdal	49
Sandaa	50
Øbugt, 1	51
Øbugt, 2	52
Borvik	53
Vaatvik	54
Spilderen, 1	55
Spilderen, 2	56
Spilderdalen	57
Digermulen	58
Vinterveien	59
Djupvik	60
Mosvold, 1	61
Mosvold, 2	62
Torsvik	63
Gjerset	64
Teksmoen	65
Stien	66
Sørfore, 1	67
Sørfore, 2	68
Marken	69
Dalen	70
Øisund	71
Kunna	72
Støtt	73
Gaasvær	74
Otervær	75
Meløskagen	76
Meløen	77
Venvik	78
Røshagen	79
Fagervik	80
Risvik	81
Meløsund	82
Mesøen	83
Sildvik	84
Ballsetvatnet	85
Ballset	86

== Climate ==
Climate data for Glomfjord, Nordland 1991-2020 (39 m)
Month	Jan	Feb	Mar	Apr	May	Jun	Jul	Aug	Sep	Oct	Nov	Dec	Year
Mean daily maximum °C (°F)	2.7 (36.9)	2 (36)	3.3 (37.9)	6.8 (44.2)	10.8 (51.4)	14.5 (58.1)	17.3 (63.1)	16.5 (61.7)	12.9 (55.2)	8 (46)	5.1 (41.2)	3.7 (38.7)	8.6 (47.5)
Daily mean °C (°F)	0 (32)	−0.5 (31.1)	0.5 (32.9)	3.6 (38.5)	7.6 (45.7)	11 (52)	13.8 (56.8)	13.2 (55.8)	9.9 (49.8)	5.6 (42.1)	2.8 (37.0)	1 (34)	5.7 (42.3)
Mean daily minimum °C (°F)	−2.1 (28.2)	−3 (27)	−2.1 (28.2)	0.9 (33.6)	4.5 (40.1)	8 (46)	10.9 (51.6)	10.5 (50.9)	7.4 (45.3)	3.4 (38.1)	0.7 (33.3)	−0.9 (30.4)	3.2 (37.7)
Average precipitation mm (inches)	214 (8.4)	166 (6.5)	201 (7.9)	126 (5.0)	118 (4.6)	121 (4.8)	120 (4.7)	149 (5.9)	244 (9.6)	251 (9.9)	195 (7.7)	239 (9.4)	2,144 (84.4)
Source 1: yr.no/met.no
Source 2: NOAA (average highs/lows)

== Economy ==
The industrial development—and thus the main contributor to the economic development and growth of the Meløy community—started around the time of World War I. It was based on electrical power production in then new Glomfjord power plant from water coming from the Svartisen glacier and the lake Storglomvatnet and gathered in the mountains. In the bottom of Glomfjorden, Norsk Hydro (today YARA) started out producing fertilizers in Glomfjord, today yara is Meløy's biggest workplace with 190 people working there

A conglomerate of industries is found there today in Glomfjord Industry Park. The municipality's overall industries are some light industry, agriculture, forestry, fishing, salmon production, and tourism.

Meløy Energi, an electrical power company, is one of the most important employers in the municipality (as of Q4 2022).

== Notable people ==
- Eindride Sommerseth (1918 – 2010), a trade unionist and politician
- Arne Pettersen (1906 - 1981), a sailor who was the last person to leave Ellis Island.
