= Tonnes, Norway =

Village in Lurøy Municipality, Norway

Tonnes
- Village
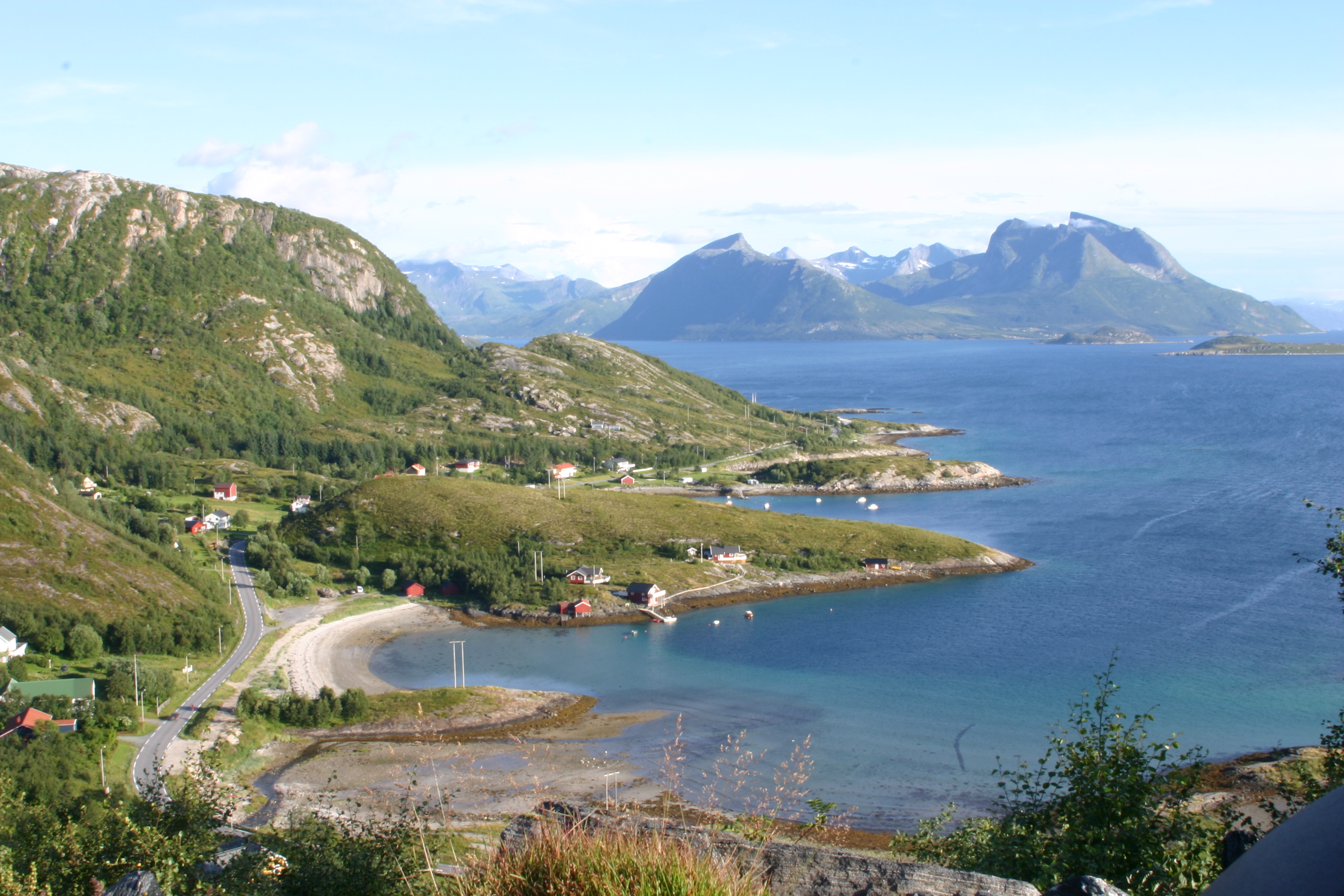
- View of the village
- Interactive map of Tonnes
- Location within Nordland Location within Norway
- Coordinates: 66.5140°N 13.0144°E
- Country: Norway
- Region: Northern Norway
- County: Nordland
- District: Helgeland
- Municipality: Lurøy Municipality
- Elevation: 10 m (33 ft)
- Time zone: UTC+01:00 (CET)
  - Summer (DST): UTC+02:00 (CEST)
- Post Code: 8750 Tonnes

Tonnes is a village in Lurøy Municipality in Nordland county, Norway. It is located on the mainland coast, about 100 kilometres (62 mi) northwest of the town of Mo i Rana. It lies on a peninsula in the far northern edge of the municipality, to the north of the islands of Aldra and Lurøya, east of Storselsøya, and south of Rangsundøya.
