= Lurøy =

Lurøy may refer to:

- Lurøy Municipality, a municipality in Nordland county, Norway
- Lurøy (village), a village within Lurøy Municipality in Nordland county, Norway
- Lurøy Church, a church in Lurøy Municipality in Nordland county, Norway
- Lurøya (disambiguation), a list of islands that are also known as Lurøy
