= Stokkvågen =

Village in Lurøy Municipality, Norway

- Village
- Interactive map of Stokkvågen
- Location within Nordland Location within Norway
- Coordinates: 66.3383°N 13.0142°E
- Country: Norway
- Region: Northern Norway
- County: Nordland
- District: Helgeland
- Municipality: Lurøy Municipality
- Elevation: 10 m (33 ft)
- Time zone: UTC+01:00 (CET)
  - Summer (DST): UTC+02:00 (CEST)
- Post Code: 8735 Stokkvågen

Stokkvågen is a village and ferry port located in Lurøy Municipality in Nordland county, Norway. The village lies on the mainland coast of Lurøy, about 60 kilometres (37 mi) west of the town of Mo i Rana. The port has ferries that connect the mainland to the islands of Onøya, Lovund, Sleneset/Moflag, and Træna to the west and to the town of Sandnessjøen to the south. The village of Stokkvågen is located along Norwegian County Road 17, along the Sjona fjord.
