= Haugland, Lurøy =

Village in Lurøy Municipality, Norway

Haugland
- Village
- Interactive map of Haugland
- Location within Nordland Location within Norway
- Coordinates: 66.3848°N 13.1069°E
- Country: Norway
- Region: Northern Norway
- County: Nordland
- District: Helgeland
- Municipality: Lurøy Municipality
- Elevation: 16 m (52 ft)
- Time zone: UTC+01:00 (CET)
  - Summer (DST): UTC+02:00 (CEST)
- Post Code: 8730 Bratland

Haugland is a village in Lurøy Municipality in Nordland county, Norway. The village is located on the mainland coast, along the Aldersundet strait between the mainland and the island of Aldra. Norwegian County Road 17 passes through the village. Aldersund Church is located in Haugland, and it serves the eastern part of the municipality.
