= Aldra =

Island in Nordland county, Norway

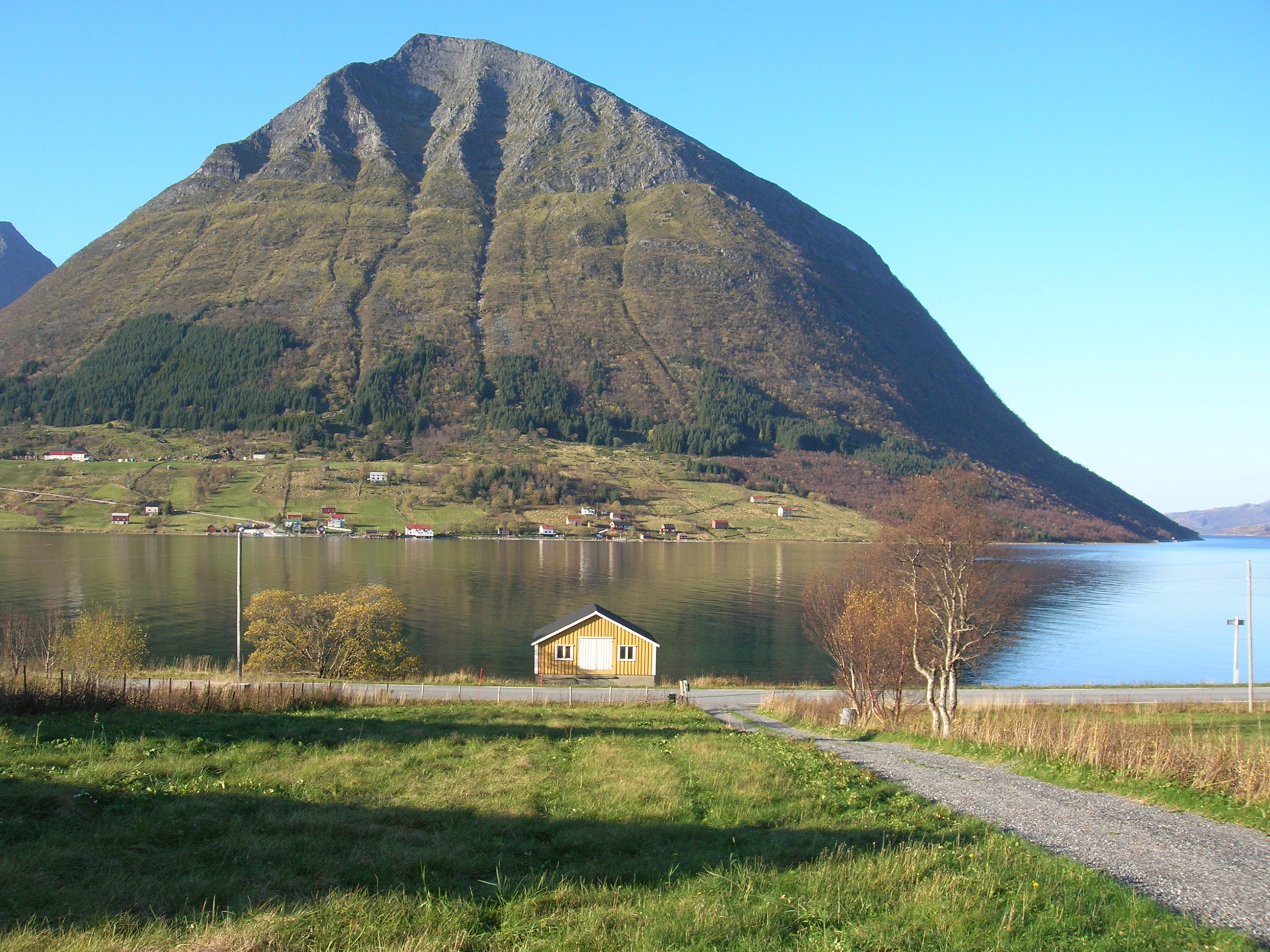
- Aldra seen from the mainland
- Interactive map of Aldra

Geography
- Location: Nordland, Norway
- Coordinates: 66.4262°N 13.0660°E
- Area: 24 km^{2} (9.3 sq mi)
- Length: 7 km (4.3 mi)
- Width: 5 km (3.1 mi)
- Highest elevation: 967 m (3173 ft)
- Highest point: Hjarttinden

Administration
- Norway
- County: Nordland
- Municipality: Lurøy Municipality

Aldra is an island in Lurøy Municipality in Nordland county, Norway. It is located just off the mainland coast, north of the village of Haugland and west of Brattland. The island is separated from the mainland by the Aldersundet strait. The islands of Stigen and Lurøya lie to the west. The village of Aldra lies on the southeastern side of the island.

Aldra island is used as a VLF-transmission site. An antenna, spanning the fjord to Brattland, was used as part of the OMEGA Navigation System until 1997. That antenna was dismantled in 2002.
