= Lurøya =

Lurøya may refer to the following places:

- Lurøya, Svalbard, an island in Svalbard, Norway
- Lurøya, Nordland, an island in Lurøy, Norway
- Lurøya, Steigen, an islet in Steigen, Norway

== See also ==
- Lurøy (disambiguation)
