= John Egil Tverdahl =

Norwegian architect

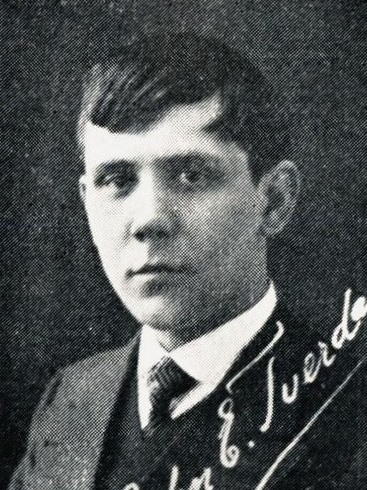
- Portrait from 1916
- Born: 27 November 1890; Trondheim, Norway
- Died: 6 December 1969 (aged 79); Trondheim, Norway
- Occupation: Architect
- Spouse: Nathalie Kobro
- Parent(s): Mikkel Johnsen Tverdahl; Dordi Eriksdatter Kregnes

John Egil Tverdahl (1890 in Trondheim – 1969) was a Norwegian architect. Tverdahl designed many churches as well as led the restoration of several churches that were located in Nordmøre, Trøndelag, and Nordland in northern Norway.

Tverdahl was educated at Trondheim Technical College in 1913. Worked with architect Johan Osness from 1913 to 1916 and with architect Einar Oscar Schou from 1916 to 1917. Starting in 1917 he worked as architect Olaf Nordhagen's assistant while working on the Nidaros Cathedral's restoration work. He specifically worked on the detailed drawings for the large rose window on the western front of the cathedral. He also undertook valuable work in arranging and systematizing the sculpture and stone collection, with archive cards, drawings, and photos of each fragment. After Nordhagen's death, Tverdahl was appointed as the acting artistic director of the project from 1926 to 1930. In 1929, he participated in the architectural competition for the last portion of the restoration of Nidaros Cathedral, which was won by Helge Thiis.

From 1930, Tverdahl had his own architectural firm in Trondheim. He collaborated with Thiis, who wanted to benefit from his building archeological knowledge and made sure that he got his own office during the restoration. He was an assistant to architect Gerhard Fischer during the archaeological investigations of Nidaros Cathedral from 1936 to 1942.

== Works ==
- Soknedal Church (1933)
- Grip Stave Church (1933; restoration)
- Hessdalen Church (1940)
- Bakke Church (1941; renovation)
- Old Edøy Church (1946; renovation)
- Bjugn Church (1956)
- Stugudal Chapel (1957)
- Hattfjelldal Church (1957; renovation)
- Vår Frue Church (1959; renovation)
- Fagerhaug Church (1959)
- Hitterdal Chapel (1959)
- Ingdalen Chapel (1960)
- Lovund Church (1960)
- Nerskogen Chapel (1962)
- Herøy Church (1968; renovation)
- Aldersund Church (1971)
