= Aldersund Church =

Church in Nordland, Norway

- Aldersund kirke
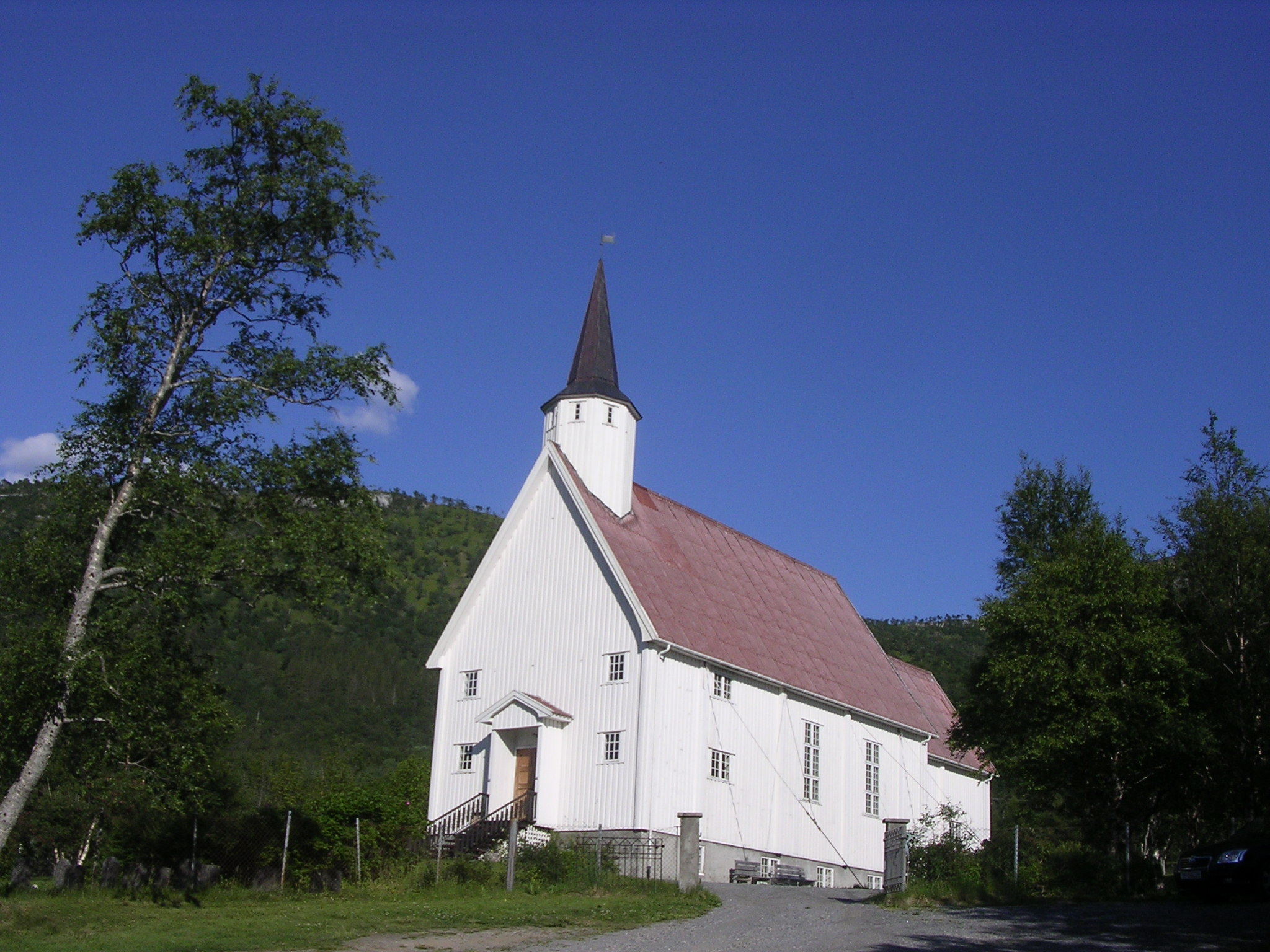
- View of the church
- Aldersund Church
- 66.38710951°N 13.11987251°E
- Location: Lurøy Municipality, Nordland
- Country: Norway
- Denomination: Church of Norway
- Churchmanship: Evangelical Lutheran

History
- Former name: Aldersund kapell
- Status: Parish church
- Founded: 1971
- Consecrated: 1971

Architecture
- Functional status: Active
- Architect: John Egil Tverdahl
- Architectural type: Long church
- Completed: 1971 (55 years ago)

Specifications
- Capacity: 230
- Materials: Wood

Administration
- Diocese: Sør-Hålogaland
- Deanery: Nord-Helgeland prosti
- Parish: Aldersund
- Norwegian Cultural Heritage Site
- Type: Church
- Status: Not protected
- ID: 83762

Aldersund Church (Norwegian: Aldersund kirke) is a parish church of the Church of Norway in Lurøy Municipality in Nordland county, Norway. It is located in the village of Haugland. It is the church for the Aldersund parish which is part of the Nord-Helgeland prosti (deanery) in the Diocese of Sør-Hålogaland. The white, wooden church was built in a long church style in 1971 using plans drawn up by the architect John Egil Tverdahl. The church seats about 230 people.

== See also ==
- List of churches in Sør-Hålogaland
