= Lovund Church =

Church in Nordland, Norway

- Lovund kirke
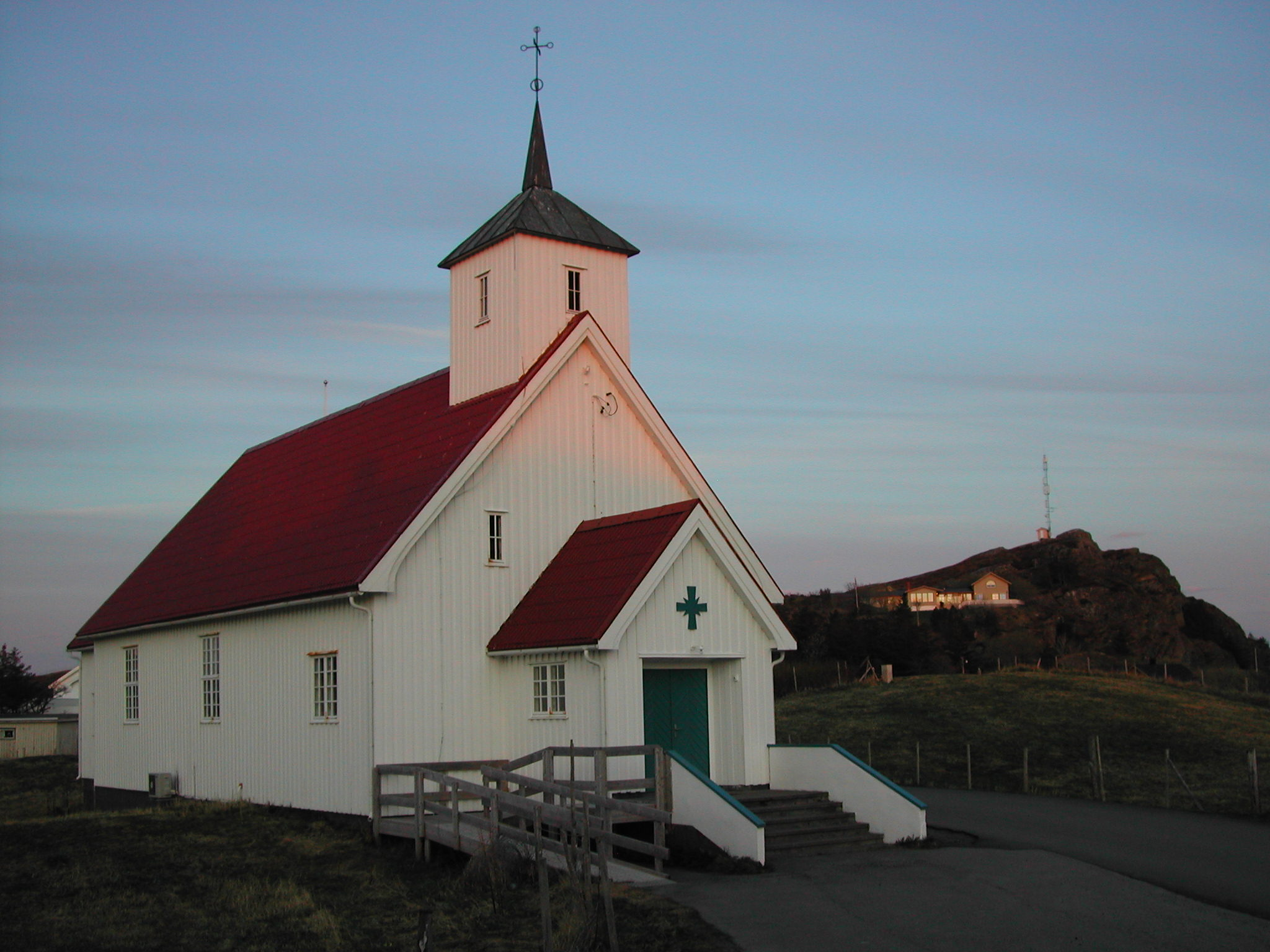
- View of the chapel
- Lovund Church
- 66.36965529°N 12.36155167°E
- Location: Lurøy Municipality, Nordland
- Country: Norway
- Denomination: Church of Norway
- Churchmanship: Evangelical Lutheran

History
- Former name: Lovund kapell
- Status: Chapel
- Founded: 1960
- Consecrated: 11 Sept 1960

Architecture
- Functional status: Active
- Architect(s): John Egil Tverdahl, Petter Andersen, and Harald Myrvang
- Architectural type: Long church
- Completed: 1960 (66 years ago)

Specifications
- Materials: Wood

Administration
- Diocese: Sør-Hålogaland
- Deanery: Nord-Helgeland prosti
- Parish: Lurøy
- Norwegian Cultural Heritage Site
- Type: Church
- Status: Not protected
- ID: 84327

Lovund Church (Norwegian: Lovund kirke) is a chapel of the Church of Norway in Lurøy Municipality in Nordland county, Norway. It is located in the island village of Lovund. It is an annex chapel in the Lurøy parish which is part of the Nord-Helgeland prosti (deanery) in the Diocese of Sør-Hålogaland. The white, wooden chapel was built in a long church style in 1960 using plans drawn up by the architects John Egil Tverdahl, Petter Andersen, and Harald Myrvang. The building was consecrated on 11 September 1960 by the Bishop Hans Edvard Wisløff.

== See also ==
- List of churches in Sør-Hålogaland
