= Moflag Church =

Church in Nordland, Norway

- Moflag kirke
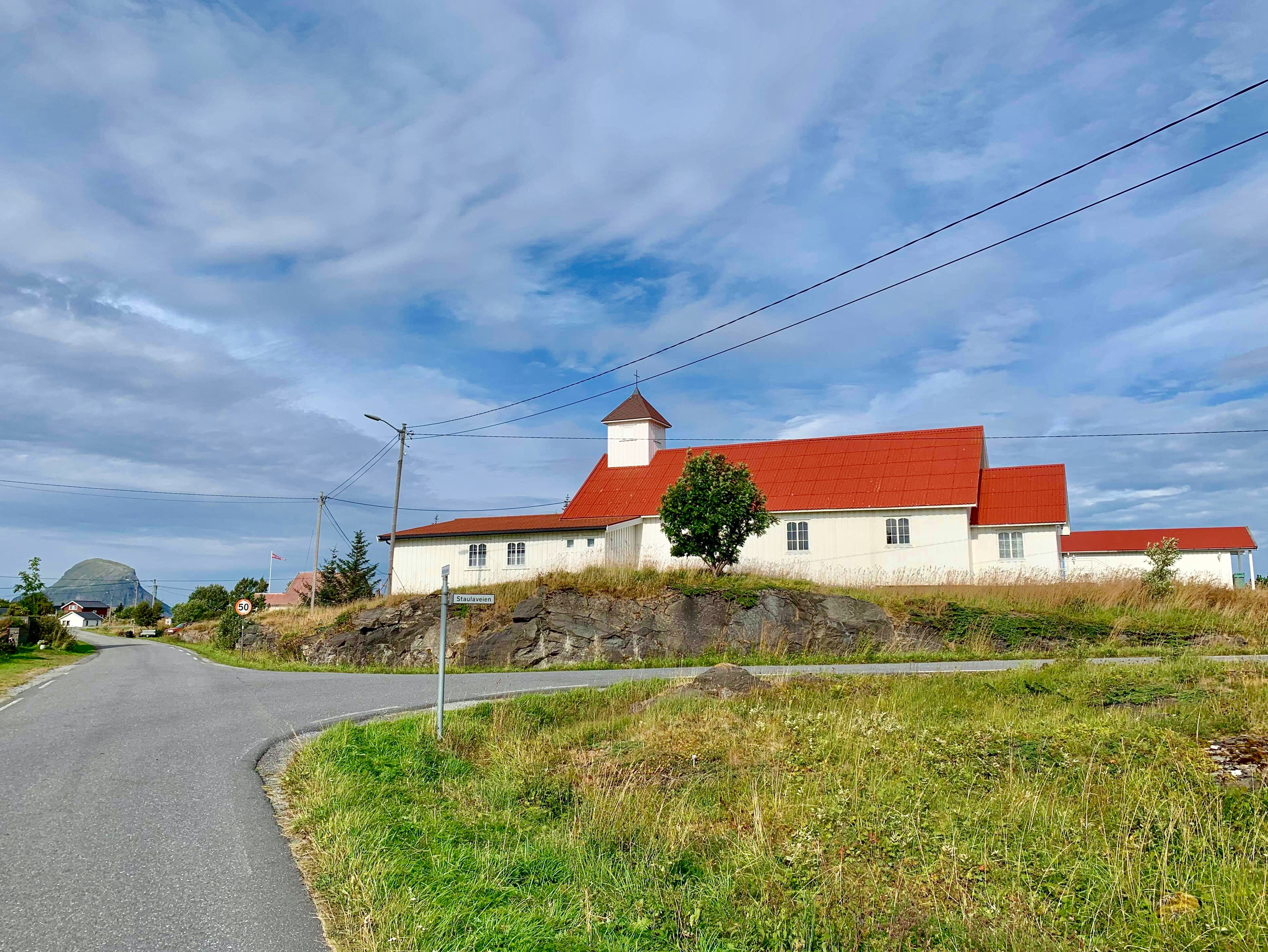
- View of the chapel
- Moflag Church
- 66.3601782°N 12.57582664°E
- Location: Lurøy Municipality, Nordland
- Country: Norway
- Denomination: Church of Norway
- Churchmanship: Evangelical Lutheran

History
- Status: Chapel
- Founded: 1921
- Consecrated: 1921

Architecture
- Functional status: Active
- Architect: Harald J. Hansen
- Architectural type: Long church
- Completed: 1921 (105 years ago)

Specifications
- Capacity: 150
- Materials: Wood

Administration
- Diocese: Sør-Hålogaland
- Deanery: Nord-Helgeland prosti
- Parish: Lurøy
- Norwegian Cultural Heritage Site
- Type: Church
- Status: Not protected
- ID: 84971

Moflag Church (Norwegian: Moflag kirke) is a chapel of the Church of Norway in Lurøy Municipality in Nordland county, Norway. It is located in the island village of Moflaget. It is an annex chapel in the Lurøy parish which is part of the Nord-Helgeland prosti (deanery) in the Diocese of Sør-Hålogaland. The white, wooden chapel was built in a long church style in 1921 using plans drawn up by the architect Harald J. Hansen. The chapel seats about 150 people.

== See also ==
- List of churches in Sør-Hålogaland
