= Solvær =

Island in Nordland, Norway

- Interactive map of Solvær

Geography
- Location: Nordland, Norway
- Coordinates: 66.363°N 12.593°E
- Archipelago: Solvær

Administration
- Norway
- County: Nordland
- Municipality: Lurøy Municipality

Demographics
- Population: 446 (2001)

Solvær is a group of islands in Lurøy Municipality in Nordland county, Norway. They are located between the islands of Lovund to the west and Onøya to the east. The islands are located about a 90-minute ferry ride west of the mainland. Due to the Gulf Stream, the climate is mild, with little snow despite its northern location.

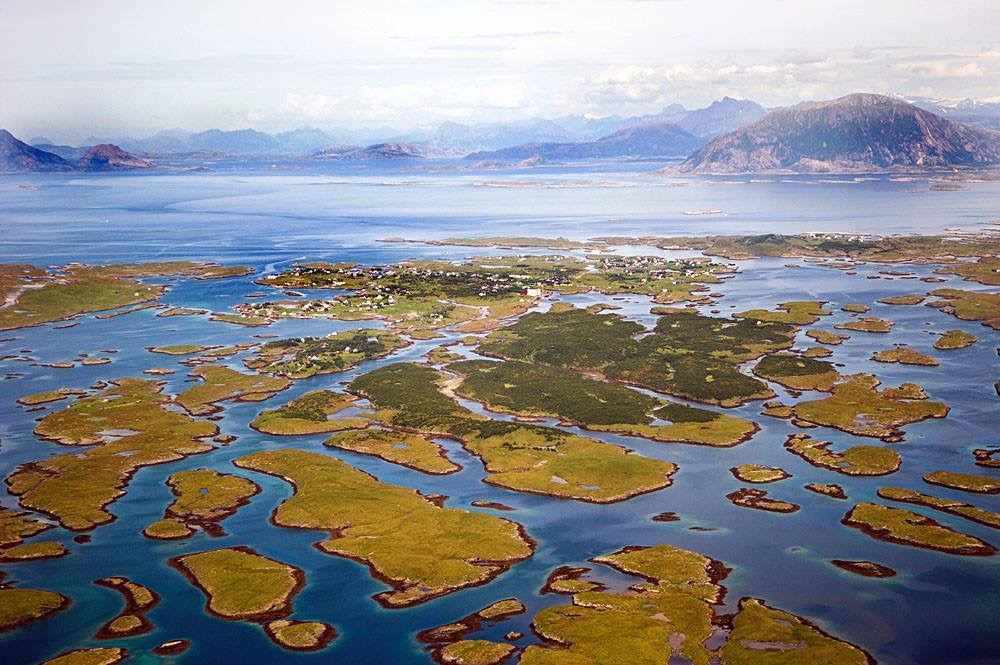
Aerial view of Solvaer Island

== Geography ==
The group consists of about 300 small and flat islands, some of which host permanent residents. Some of the main, inhabited islands include Sleneset, Moflaget, Slotterøya, Straumøya, Nordsolvær, and Sørsolvær. The main village area is Sleneset, which is also the port at which the local ferries stop on the way from Stokkvågen (on the mainland) to the islands of Lovund and on to Træna Municipality to the west. Moflag Church, located on the island Moflaget, is the local church for the islands.

== Important Bird Area ==
The archipelago has been designated an Important Bird Area (IBA) by BirdLife International because it supports significant populations of breeding Eurasian eagle-owls as well as of non-breeding red-breasted mergansers.

== See also ==
- List of islands of Norway
