= Helgeland =

- Traditional district
- The light blue, yellow and green area in South of the map is the Helgeland district.
- Interactive map of Helgeland
- Coordinates: 66.2°N 13.73°E
- Country: Norway
- Region: Northern Norway
- County: Nordland
- Time zone: UTC+01:00 (CET)
  - Summer (DST): UTC+02:00 (CEST)

Helgeland is the most southerly district in Northern Norway. Generally speaking, Helgeland refers to the part of Nordland county that is located south of the Arctic Circle. It is bordered in the north by the Saltfjellet mountains and Svartisen glacier, which form a natural border with the Salten district. In the south, Helgeland borders Trøndelag county.

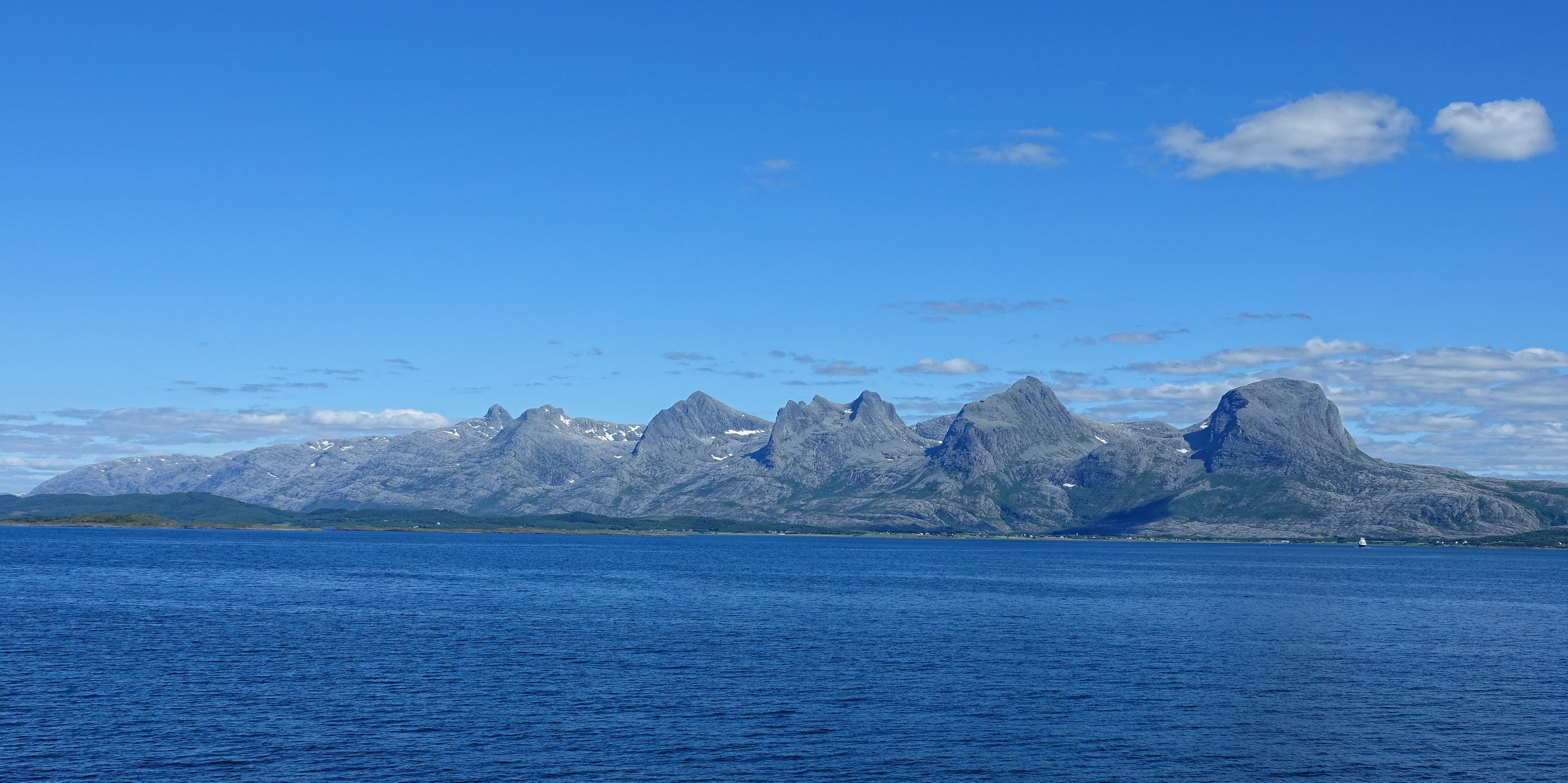
The Seven Sisters in Alstahaug Municipality

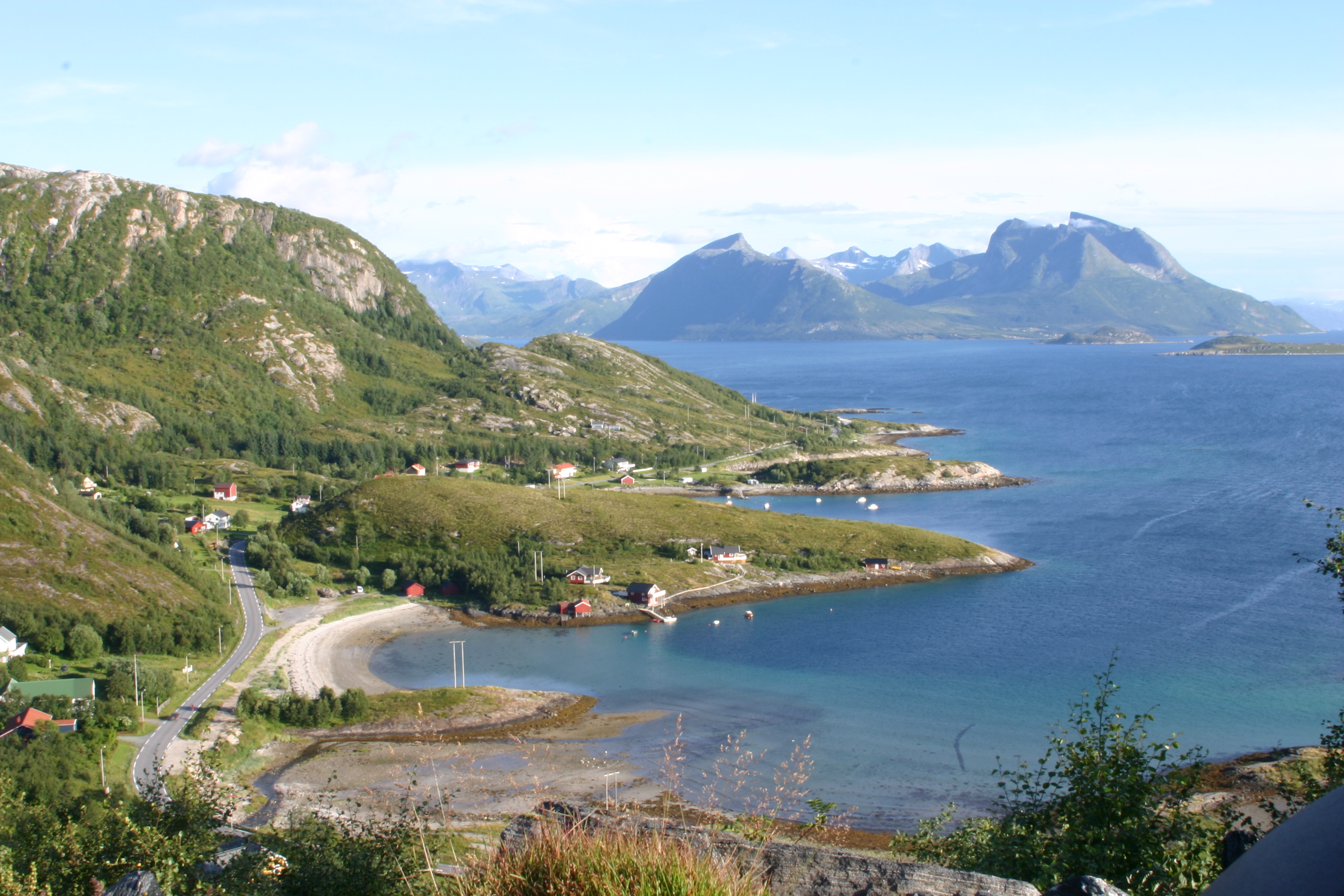
Tonnes in Lurøy

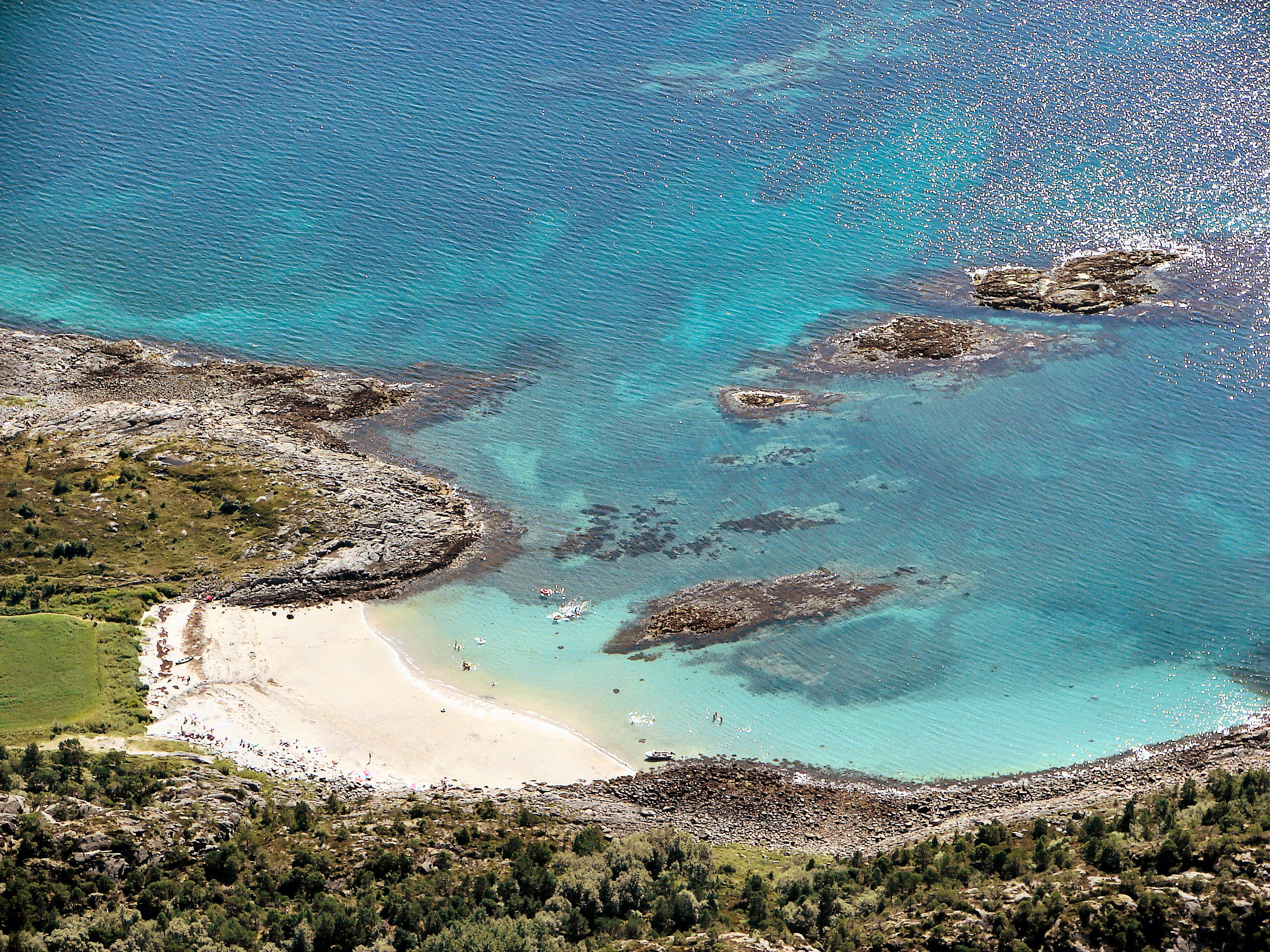
The Vega archipelago is on the Unesco World Heritage List.

The district covers an area of about 18,832 square kilometres (7,271 sq mi), with nearly 79,000 inhabitants. There are four towns in the district: from south to north these are Brønnøysund, Mosjøen, Sandnessjøen, and Mo i Rana.

== Name ==
The Old Norse form of the name was Hálogaland (see Hålogaland).

== Geography ==
Helgeland is commonly divided into three or four sections:

- Southern Helgeland (actually southwest), which consists of the municipalities Bindal, Sømna, Brønnøy, Vega and Vevelstad.
- Central Helgeland, which is sometimes further divided into the regions:
  - Inner Helgeland, which consists of the municipalities Grane, Hattfjelldal and Vefsn.
  - Outer Helgeland, which consists of the municipalities Leirfjord, Alstahaug, Herøy and Dønna.
- Northern Helgeland, which consists of the municipalities Hemnes, Rana, Nesna, Lurøy, Træna and Rødøy.

Helgeland is characterized by pointed mountains and Strandflaten, a shallow lowland area, sometimes just above the sea surface, and sometimes just below the surface. People living on the coast have settled on this lowland (while inland towns, such as Mo and Mosjøen, are situated in valleys). A consequence of the Strandflaten is thousands of islands, and shallow waters going far into the sea. This has provided some shelter from stormy weather, which might occur in winter. Some islands are fairly large, often with unique mountains, such as Torghatten, De syv søstre (The Seven Sisters), Hestmannen, Rødøyløva (in Rødøy Municipality), Dønnamannen (picture), and several small islands in Træna Municipality. There are several sea bird colonies, such as Lovund (picture) with thousands of puffins. The Solvær Islands (Solværøyene) in Lurøy Municipality consists of about 300 small and flat islands and has the highest densities of Eurasian eagle-owls in Europe.

The highest mountains, are located inland, where Oksskolten is the highest mountain in Northern Norway. There are many valleys inland, such as the Dunderlandsdalen, Vefsndalen, and Hattfjelldalen. Røssvatnet is the second largest lake in Norway. There are three large national parks in Helgeland: Saltfjellet–Svartisen National Park (partly), Børgefjell National Park (partly), and Lomsdal–Visten National Park (created in May 2009).

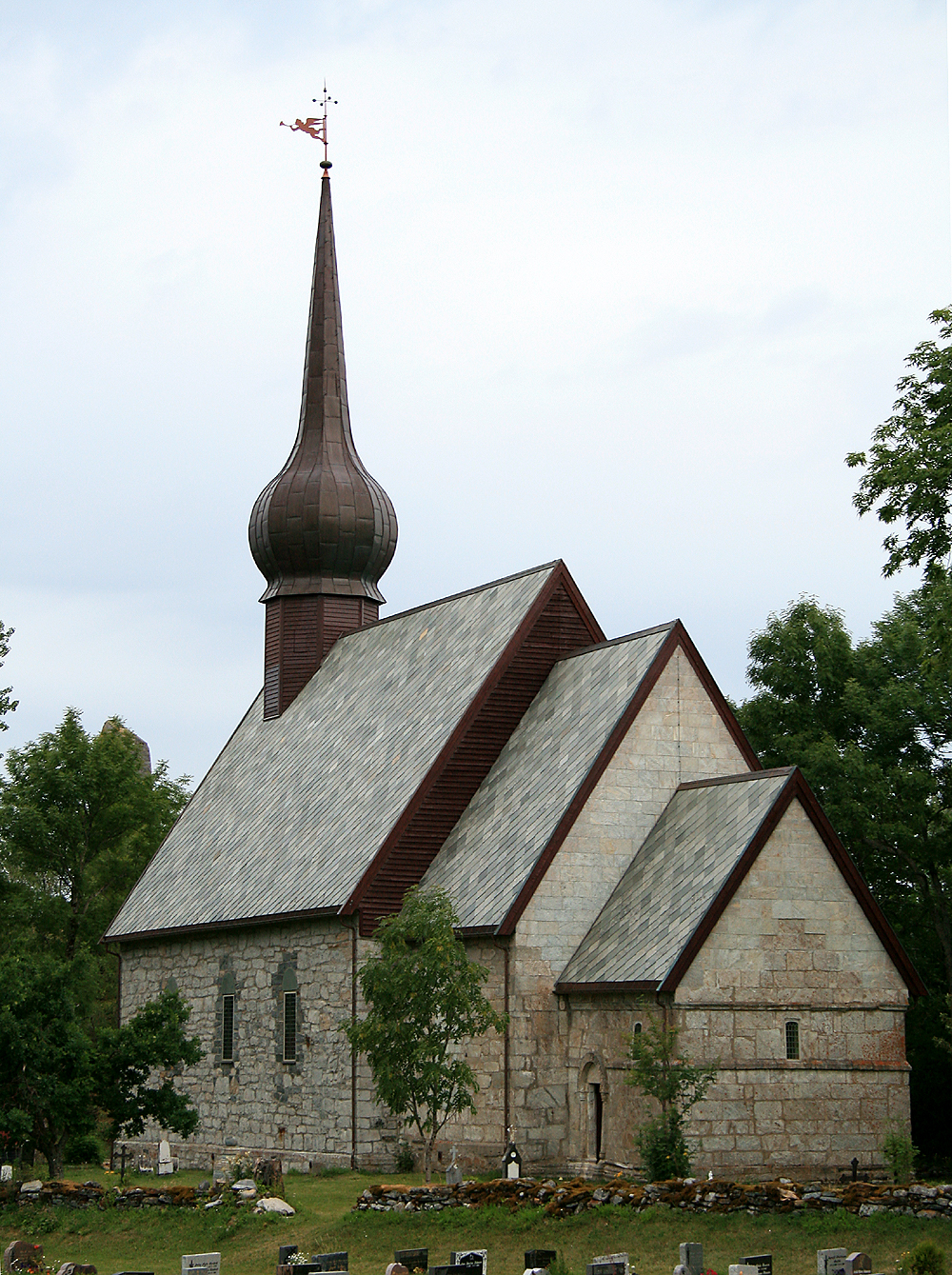
Alstahaug Church, a stone church built in the 12th century

== Cultural references ==
Helgeland is the scene for Henrik Ibsen's 1857 historical play "The Vikings at Helgeland" (Hærmændene paa Helgeland), whose plot takes place at this region during the time of Erik Blood-axe (c. 930–934).

Helgeland Kammerkor, a mixed choir with members from all parts of Helgeland, have recorded an album of folk music from Helgeland (Folketoner fra Helgeland, 2005). The album contains 27 folk tunes from Helgeland, recorded in collaboration with folk musicians from the area. The album was recorded in Alstahaug Church, a 900-year-old stone church located near Sandnessjøen.

== Media gallery ==
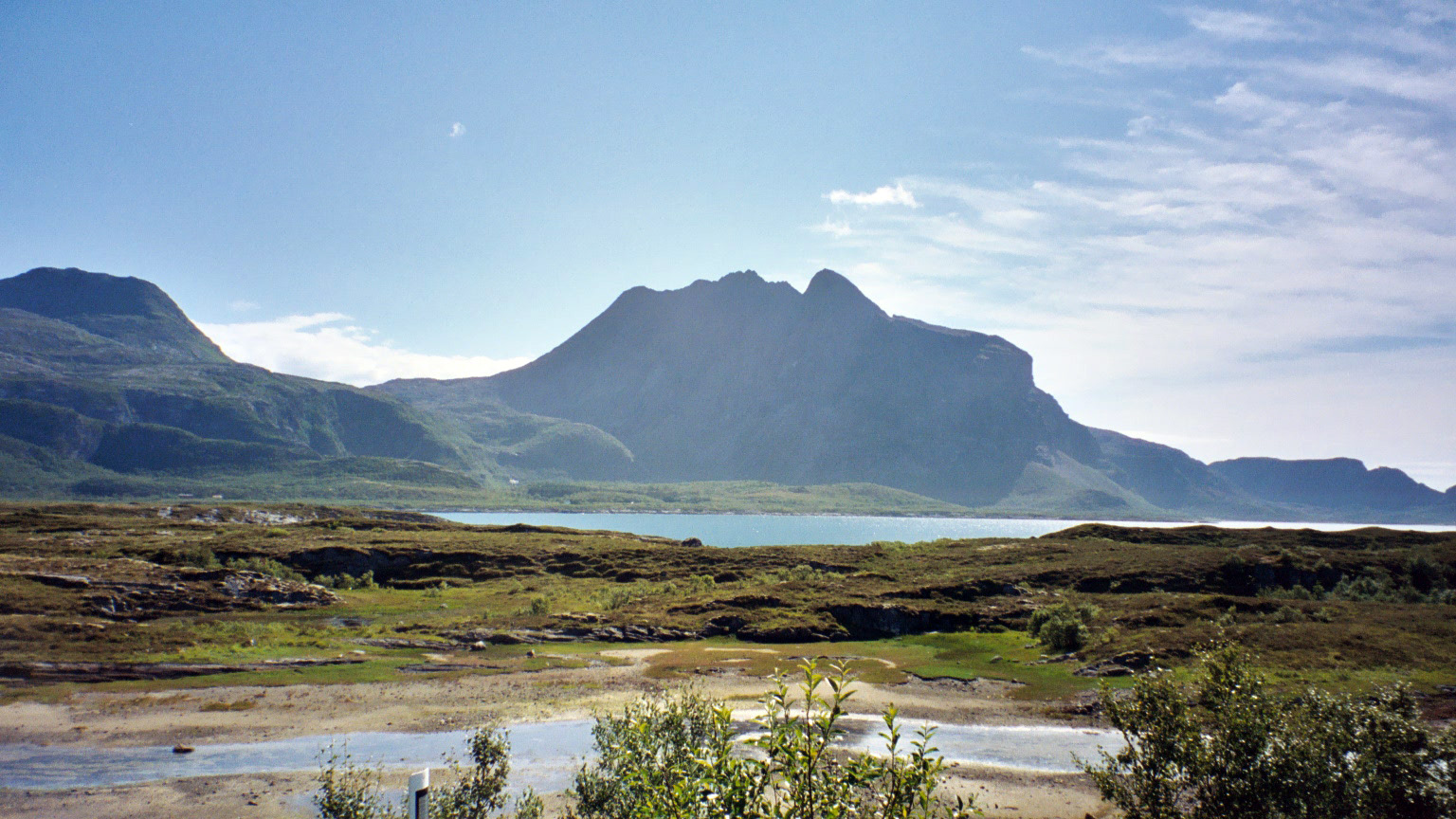
Dønnamannen (the Dønna man)

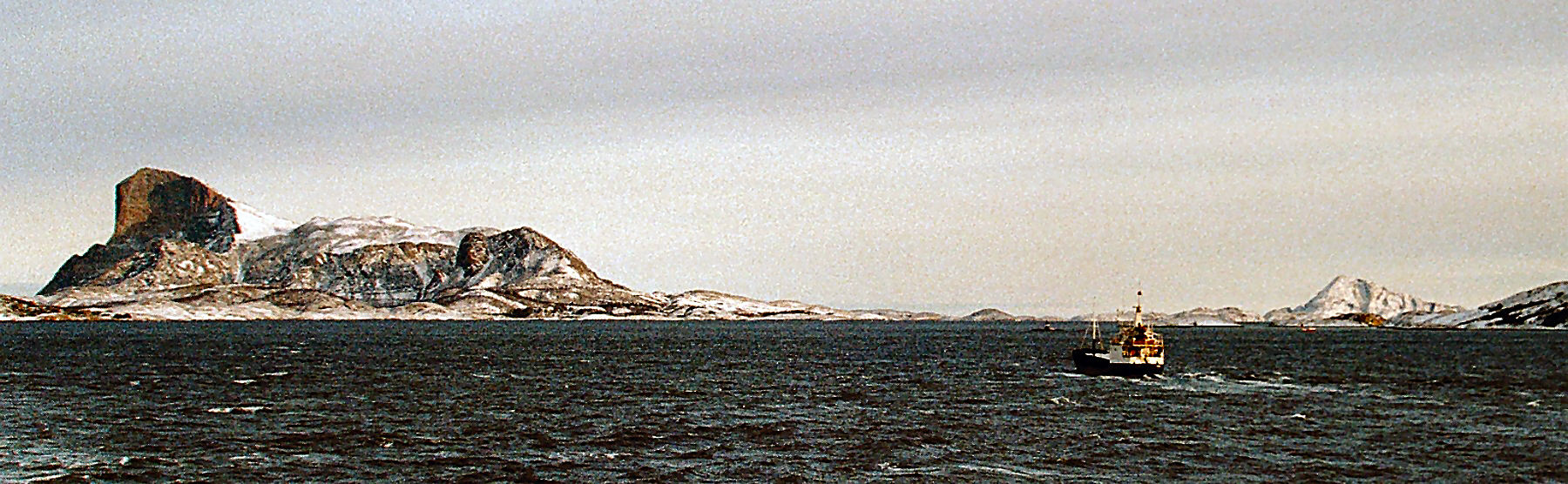
Rødøyløva mountain (the lion of Rødøy)

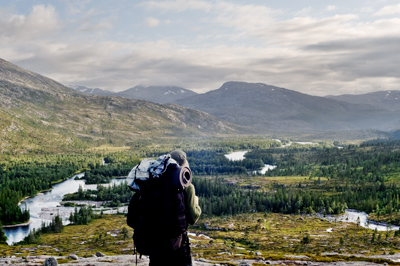
Part of the Lomsdalen-Visten National Park

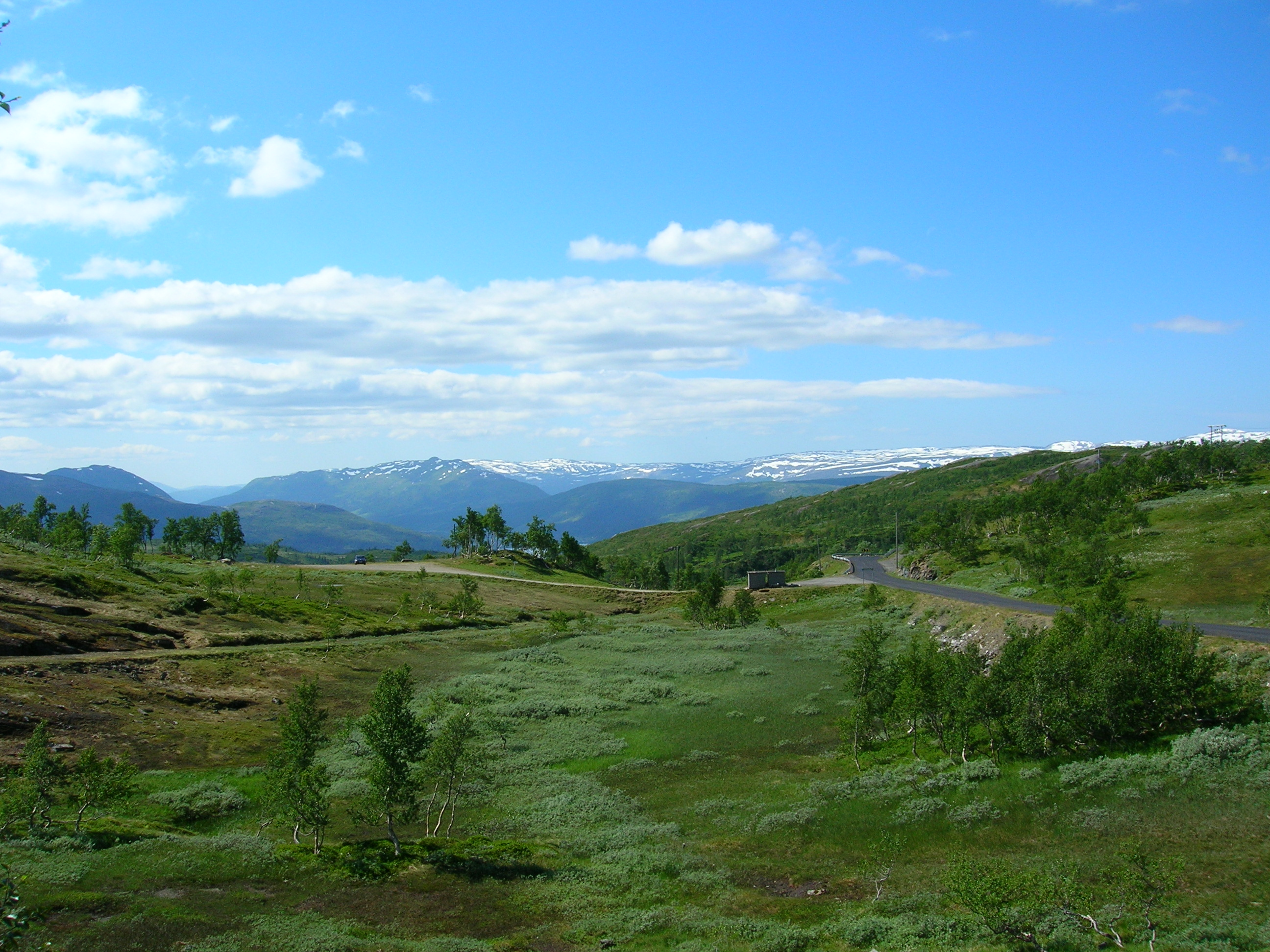
View from Korgfjellet mountain north of Mosjøen

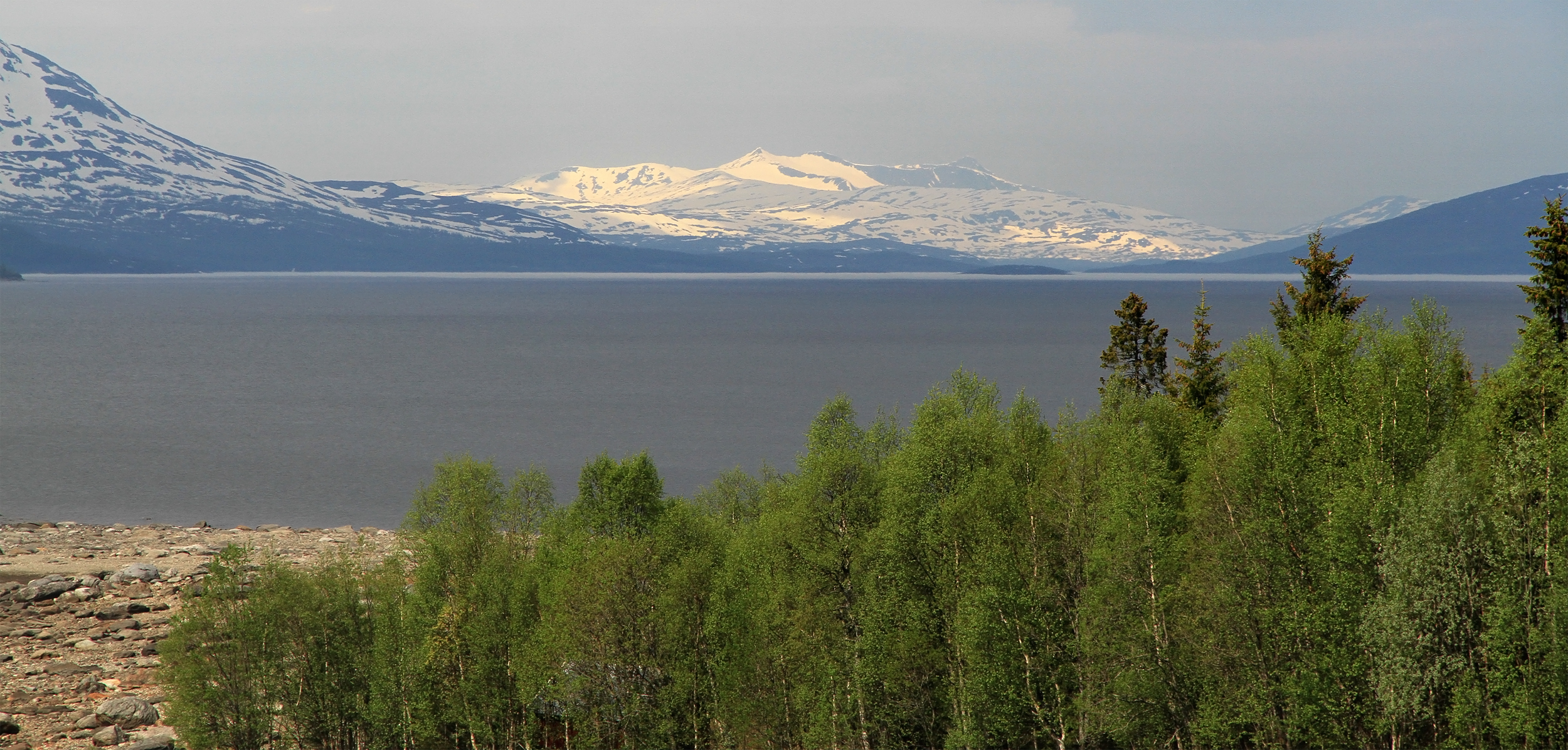
Røssvatnet, Norway's second largest lake, located inland nearly 400 m above sea level

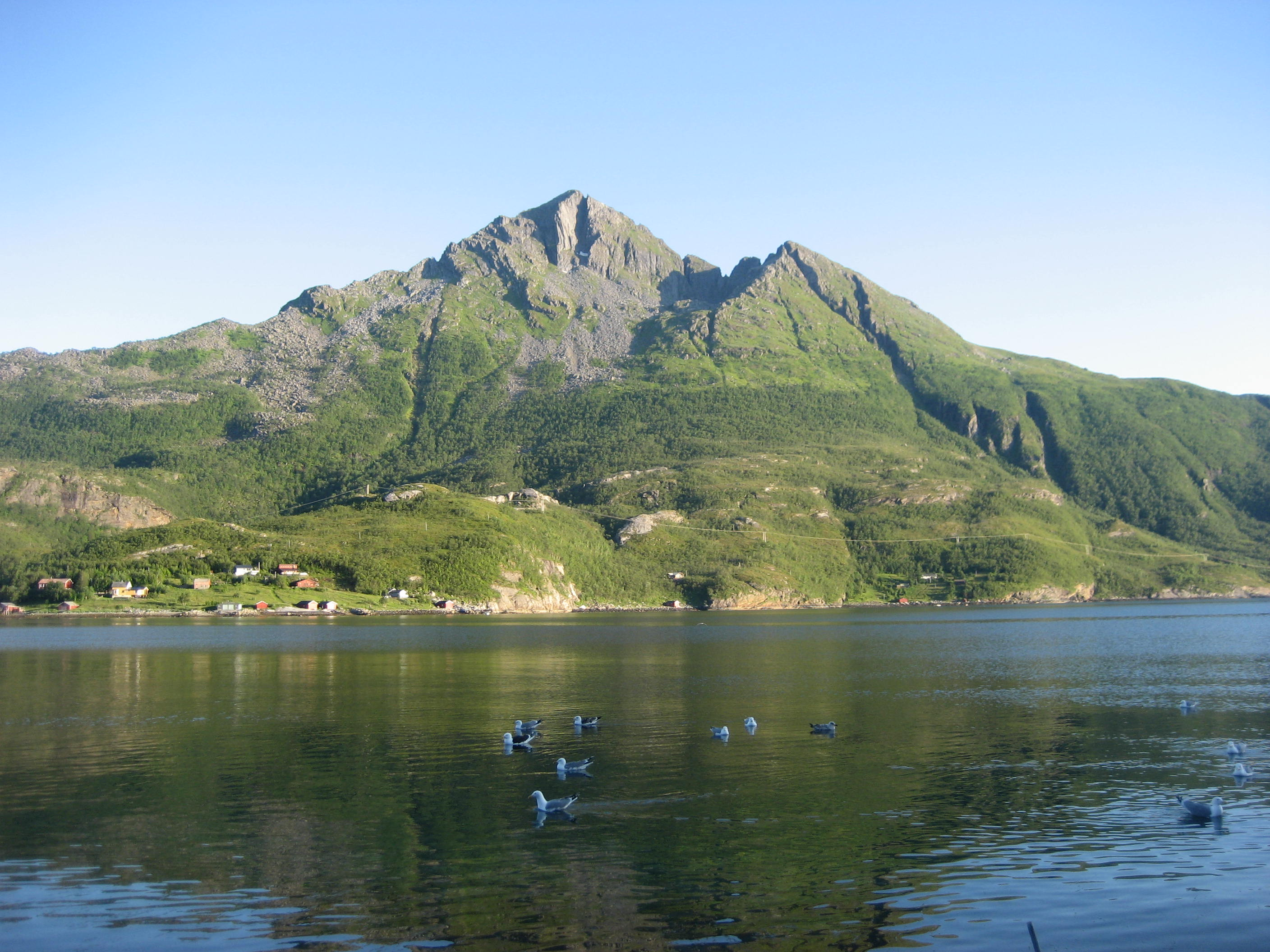
Okstinden mountain (791 m.) in the municipality of Lurøy
