= Lurøy Church =

Church in Nordland, Norway

- Lurøy kirke
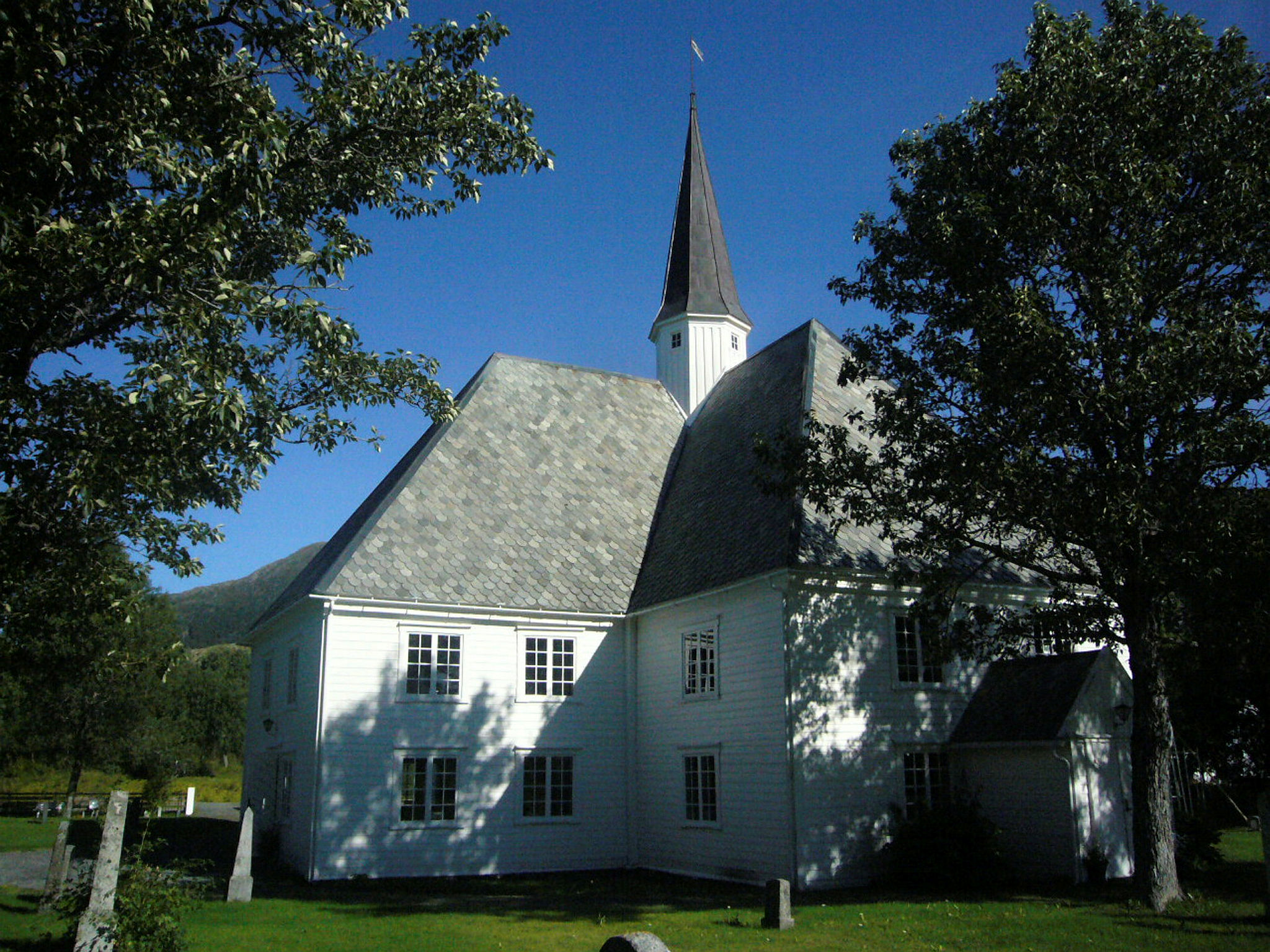
- View of the church
- Lurøy Church
- 66.41845297°N 12.84935296°E
- Location: Lurøy Municipality, Nordland
- Country: Norway
- Denomination: Church of Norway
- Churchmanship: Evangelical Lutheran

History
- Status: Parish church
- Founded: 14th century
- Consecrated: 1812

Architecture
- Functional status: Active
- Architectural type: Cruciform
- Completed: 1812 (214 years ago)

Specifications
- Capacity: 375
- Materials: Wood

Administration
- Diocese: Sør-Hålogaland
- Deanery: Nord-Helgeland prosti
- Parish: Lurøy
- Norwegian Cultural Heritage Site
- Type: Church
- Status: Automatically protected
- ID: 84343

Lurøy Church (Norwegian: Lurøy kirke) is a parish church of the Church of Norway in Lurøy Municipality in Nordland county, Norway. It is located on the south side of the village of Lurøy on the island of Lurøya. It is the main church for the Lurøy parish which is part of the Nord-Helgeland prosti (deanery) in the Diocese of Sør-Hålogaland. The white, wooden church was built in a cruciform style in 1812. The church seats about 375 people.

== History ==
The earliest existing historical records of the church parish date back to the year 1432, but the church was not new that year. Around the year 1435, the old church was replaced with a new timber-framed cruciform building on the same site. During the 1630s, the church underwent major repairs. Again in 1647, more repairs were carried out. In 1653–1654, the church was repaired again and a new entry porch was built. After many years of repairs, the old church was torn down in 1661 and replaced with a new building on the same site. The new church was also a cruciform design, reusing some of the timbers from the old building. In 1720, the church was torn down and replaced with a brand new long church on the same site. It had a sacristy on one end and an entry porch on the other end. In 1812, the old church was torn down and replaced with a new cruciform building that was also located on the same site. In 1834, a small tower was added on the roof above the nave.

== See also ==
- List of churches in Sør-Hålogaland
