= Lurøy Municipality =

Municipality in Nordland, Norway

Lurøy Municipality Lurøy kommune
- Municipality
- Lurø herred (historic name)
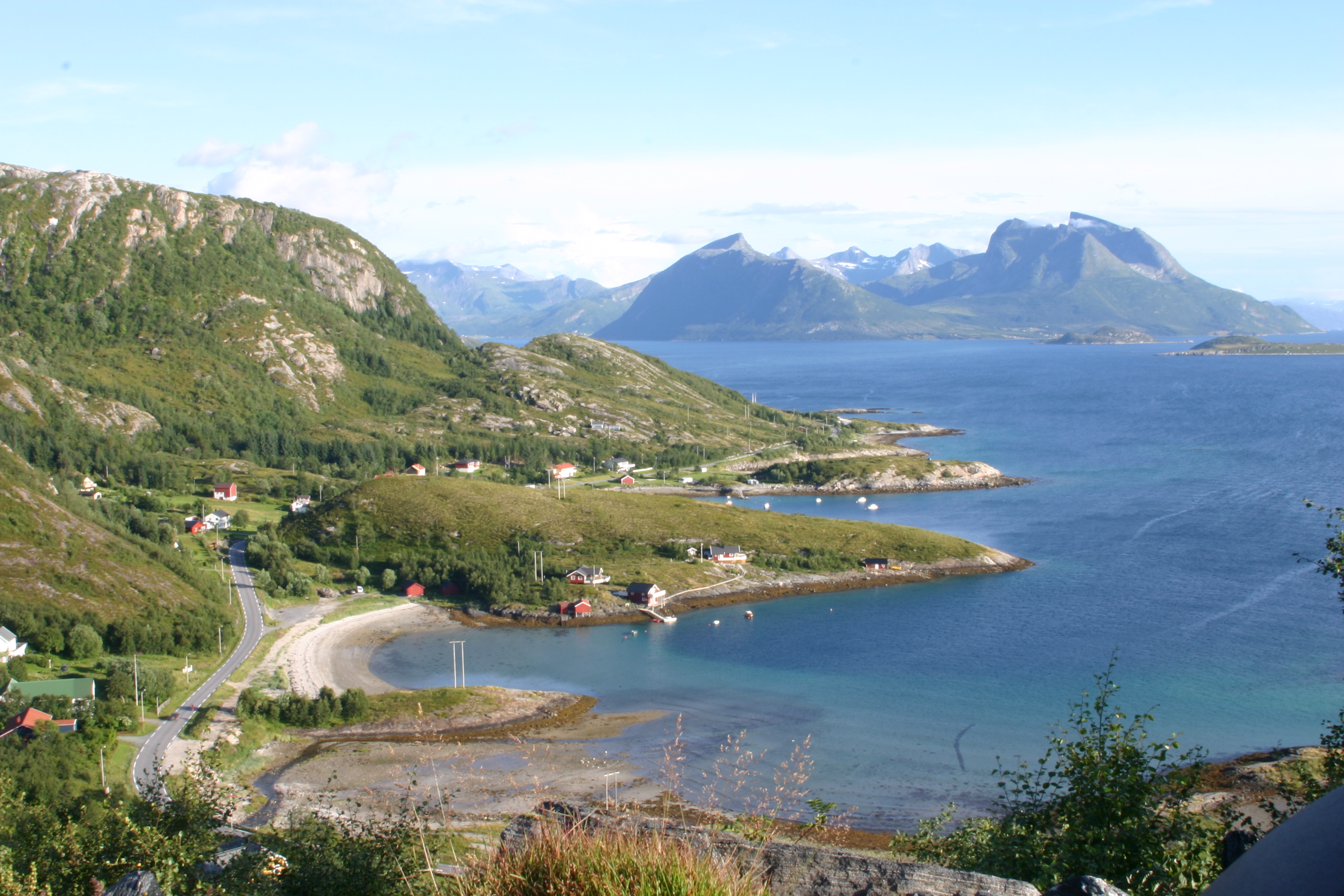
- View of Tonnes in northern Lurøy

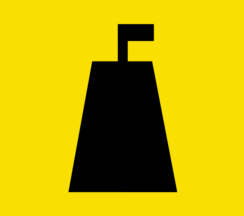
- Flag Coat of arms

- Nordland within Norway

- Lurøy within Nordland
- Coordinates: 66°25′55″N 12°51′18″E
- Country: Norway
- County: Nordland
- District: Helgeland
- Established: 1 Jan 1838
  - Created as: Formannskapsdistrikt
- Administrative centre: Onøya

Government
  - Mayor (2019): Håkon Lund (H)

Area
  - Total: 265.16 km^{2} (102.38 sq mi)
  - Land: 258.11 km^{2} (99.66 sq mi)
  - Water: 7.04 km^{2} (2.72 sq mi) 2.7%
  - Rank: #275 in Norway
- Highest elevation: 1,172.7 m (3,847 ft)

Population (2024)
  - Total: 1,886
  - Rank: #288 in Norway
  - Density: 7.1/km^{2} (18/sq mi)
  - Change (10 years): ▼ −0.8%
- Demonym: Lurøyværing

Official language
  - Norwegian form: Bokmål
- Time zone: UTC+01:00 (CET)
  - Summer (DST): UTC+02:00 (CEST)
- ISO 3166 code: NO-1834
- Website: Official website

Lurøy is a municipality in Nordland county, Norway. It is part of the Helgeland traditional region. The administrative centre of the municipality is located on the island of Onøya. Other villages in Lurøy include Aldra, Haugland, Konsvikosen, Lovund, Lurøy, Sleneset / Solværøyene, Stokkvågen, and Tonnes.

The municipality is located on the coast just south of the Arctic Circle, on the western edge of the Saltfjellet mountain range. The Lurøygården (Lurøy Farm) on the island of Lurøya is a more-than-200-year-old renaissance garden with old plants, a pool, and a nearly 20-metre (66 ft) high Copper Beech.

The 265-square-kilometre (102 sq mi) municipality is the 275th largest by area out of the 357 municipalities in Norway. Lurøy Municipality is the 288th most populous municipality in Norway with a population of 1,886. The municipality's population density is 7.1 inhabitants per square kilometre (18/sq mi) and its population has decreased by 0.8% over the previous 10-year period.

== General information ==
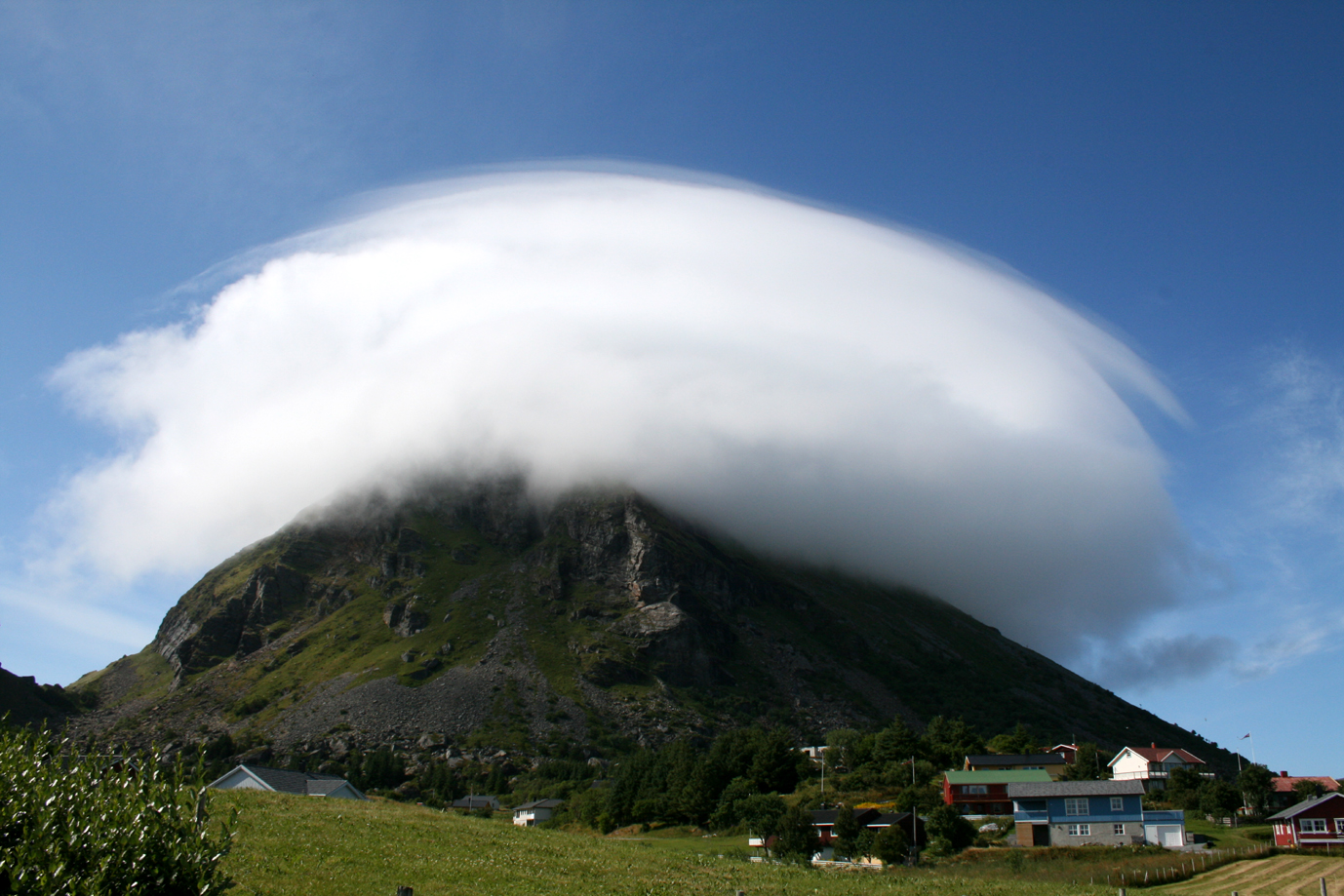
View of the island Lovund

Lurøy was established as a municipality on 1 January 1838 (see formannskapsdistrikt law). On 1 January 1872, the far western island district (population: 289) was separated from Lurøy to become the new Træna Municipality. This left Lurøy with 1,554 residents. The borders of Lurøy have not changed since that time.

=== Name ===
The municipality (originally the parish) is named after the island of Lurøya (Old Norse: Lúðrøy) since the first Lurøy Church was built there. The first element is lúðr which means "hollowed log" (here probably referring to the form of the mountain of the island). The last element is øy which means "island". Historically, the name of the municipality was spelled Lurø. On 6 January 1908, a royal resolution changed the spelling of the name of the municipality to Lurøy.

=== Coat of arms ===
The coat of arms was granted on 22 August 1986. The official blazon is "Or, a navigation cairn sable" (Norwegian: I gull en svart sjøvarde). This means the arms have a field (background) that has a tincture of Or which means it is commonly colored yellow, but if it is made out of metal, then gold is used. The charge is black navigational cairn. This was chosen to symbolize the local dependence on fishing and sailing in this island municipality. The arms were designed by Olga Nilsen after a proposal by Dagmar Vilfridadottir Olaisen.

=== Churches ===
The Church of Norway has two parishes (sokn) within Lurøy Municipality. It is part of the Nord-Helgeland prosti (deanery) in the Diocese of Sør-Hålogaland.

Churches in Lurøy Municipality
Parish (sokn)	Church name	Location of the church	Year built
Aldersund	Aldersund Church	Haugland	1971
Lurøy	Lovund Church	Lovund	1960
Lurøy	Lurøy Church	Lurøya	1812
Lurøy	Moflag Church	Moflaget	1921

== Geography and climate ==
Lurøy is located on the western coast of Helgeland. The small strip of mainland Lurøy runs from Tonnes in the north along Norwegian County Road 17 to Stokkvågen along the Sjona fjord in the south. The rest of the municipality is located on 1,375 islands located to the west of the mainland. The major islands include Aldra, Lurøya, Onøya, Stigen, Solvær, and Lovund. There are also two islands in the northern part of Lurøya that are divided between Lurøy and neighboring Rødøy Municipality: Nesøya and Hestmona. The highest point in the municipality is the 1,172.7-metre (3,847 ft) tall mountain Strandtindan, a tripoint on the border of Lurøy Municipality, Rødøy Municipality, and Rana Municipality.

The populated islands are reached by car ferry from Stokkvågen on the mainland. The ferry reaches Onøy (which has a bridge to Lurøya), Solvær and Lovund 5 times per day.

=== Climate ===
The Norwegian Meteorological Institute has operated weather stations on Solvær islands since 1939. Data shows a marine west coast climate (oceanic climate) with very mild winters for the high latitude. Spring and summer are the driest seasons, while December is the wettest month. The all-time high was recorded in July 2018, and the all-time low is from February 1966. The average date for the last overnight freeze (low below 0 °C (32.0 °F)) in spring is 20 April and average date for first freeze in autumn is 5 November giving a frost-free season of 198 days (1981-2010 average for Solvær).

Climate data for Solvær 1991-2020 (10 m, precipitation days 1961-90, extremes 1954-2025)
Month	Jan	Feb	Mar	Apr	May	Jun	Jul	Aug	Sep	Oct	Nov	Dec	Year
Record high °C (°F)	10.6 (51.1)	10.8 (51.4)	11.1 (52.0)	17.5 (63.5)	25.8 (78.4)	29.1 (84.4)	30.7 (87.3)	28 (82)	23.3 (73.9)	19.1 (66.4)	15.1 (59.2)	10.3 (50.5)	30.7 (87.3)
Daily mean °C (°F)	1.2 (34.2)	0.6 (33.1)	1.5 (34.7)	4.3 (39.7)	7.5 (45.5)	10.7 (51.3)	13.2 (55.8)	13.4 (56.1)	11 (52)	7.1 (44.8)	4.2 (39.6)	2.4 (36.3)	6.4 (43.6)
Record low °C (°F)	−14.5 (5.9)	−16 (3)	−10.2 (13.6)	−6.4 (20.5)	−2.5 (27.5)	0.3 (32.5)	4.4 (39.9)	3.9 (39.0)	0.5 (32.9)	−5.2 (22.6)	−8 (18)	−13.5 (7.7)	−16 (3)
Average precipitation mm (inches)	119 (4.7)	107 (4.2)	94 (3.7)	71 (2.8)	78 (3.1)	69 (2.7)	86 (3.4)	101 (4.0)	132 (5.2)	115 (4.5)	117 (4.6)	142 (5.6)	1,231 (48.5)
Average precipitation days (≥ 1.0 mm)	16	14	14	13	11	11	14	14	18	20	17	18	180
Source: Norwegian Meteorological Institute

The part of the Lurøy municipality that is situated on the mainland of Norway has slightly cooler winters and a smaller seasonal temperature lag. This part of the municipality also receives on average roughly 2.5 times the precipitation amounts of the islands, which makes this part of the municipality the wettest region within Northern Norway. This large amount of precipitation is generated by the orographic lift caused by the mountains on the west side of the municipality.

Climate data for Lurøy 1991-2020 (115 m)
Month	Jan	Feb	Mar	Apr	May	Jun	Jul	Aug	Sep	Oct	Nov	Dec	Year
Daily mean °C (°F)	−0.5 (31.1)	−0.8 (30.6)	−0.5 (31.1)	3.0 (37.4)	6.9 (44.4)	10.6 (51.1)	13.5 (56.3)	13.0 (55.4)	11 (52)	5.5 (41.9)	2.8 (37.0)	0.8 (33.4)	5.4 (41.8)
Average precipitation mm (inches)	288.3 (11.35)	244.8 (9.64)	259.1 (10.20)	213.5 (8.41)	198.5 (7.81)	187.0 (7.36)	177.5 (6.99)	219.0 (8.62)	346.9 (13.66)	348.3 (13.71)	262.0 (10.31)	321.3 (12.65)	3,066.2 (120.71)
Average precipitation days (≥ 1.0 mm)	18	18	18	16	16	15	14	16	18	18	17	20	204
Source 1: Norwegian Meteorological Institute
Source 2: NOAA

=== Farms of Lurøy ===
Historically, the land of Lurøy was divided up into named farms. These farms were used in census and tax records and are useful for genalogical research.

==== Farm maps ====
Note: Coordinates are approximate. The map has been divided into parts consistent with the enumeration districts (Norwegian: tellingskrets) in the 1920 census of Norway. This map will include one farm name per farm number; other farm names or subdivision numbers may exist.

Lurøy
Farms:
1 Lovunden
2 Grønningen
3 Troldøen
4 Sengsdraget
5 Juløen
6 Risvær
7 Solvær søndre
8 Moflaget
9 Slaaterøen
10 Ulvøen
11 Lunderøen
12 Solvær norde
13 Reløen
14 Kvitvær
15 Sandvær
16 Maavær
17 Sutternes
18 Lurøen
19 Svinøen
20 Onøen indre
21 Onøen ytre
22 Stoksvik
23 Sjonøen
24 Sundet
25 Klippingvaag
26 Silen
27 Bogen
28 Røitvik
29 Selnes
30 Haugland
31 Aas (Ås)
32 Vatnet
33 Bratland
34 Lien
35 Olvikvatnet
36 Alderen
37 Hjart
38 Aspnes
39 Ørnes
40 Stuvland
41 Okstind
42 Fingammen
43 Kvinen
44 Konsvik
45 Kokviken
46 Aspdalen
47 Tonnes
48 Kvarøen indre
49 Kvarøen ytre
50 Hestmoen
51 Nesøen søndre
52 Lurøy school
53 Lurøy church (built 1812)
54 Lovund church (built 1960)
55 Aldersund church (built 1971)
56 Moflag church (built 1921)

==== Farm names and numbers ====
Following are the farms in Lurøy municipality, as they are listed in O. Rygh's series "Norske Gaardnavne" ("Norwegian Farm Names"), the Nordland volume of which was published in 1905.

See also: Digital version of Norske Gaardnavne - Nordland (in Norwegian)

The farm numbers are used in some census records, and numbers that are near each other indicate that those farms are geographically proximate. Handwritten Norwegian sources, particularly those prior to 1800, may use variants on these names. For recorded variants before 1723, see the digital version of O. Rygh.

Farm names were often used as part of Norwegian names, in addition to the person's given name and patronymic or inherited surname. Some families retained the farm name, or toponymic, as a surname when they emigrated, so in those cases tracing a surname may tell you specifically where in Norway the family was from. This tradition began to change in the mid to late 19th century, and inherited surnames were codified into law in 1923.

If you can't find an entry when you are searching for a word that starts with AE, Ae, O, A or Aa, it may have been transcribed from one of those letters not used in English. Try looking for it under the Norwegian letter; Æ, Ø, and Å appear at the end of the Norwegian alphabet.

Farm Name	Farm Number
Lovunden	1
Grønningen	2
Troldøen	3
Sengsdraget	4
Juløen	5
Risvær	6
Solvær søndre	7
Moflaget	8
Slaaterøen	9
Ulvøen	10
Lunderøen	11
Solvær norde	12
Reløen	13
Kvitvær	14
Sandvær	15
Maavær	16
Sutternes	17
Lurøen (island)	18
Svinøen	19
Onøen indre	20
Onøen ytre	21
Stoksvik	22
Sjonøen	23
Sundet	24
Klippingvaag	25
Kokviken	25, 3
Silen	26
Bogen	27
Røitvik	28
Selnes	29
Haugland	30
Aas (Ås)	31
Vatnet	32
Bratland	33
Lien	34
Olvikvatnet	35
Alderen	36
Hjart	37
Aspnes	38
Ørnes	39
Stuvland	40
Okstind	41
Fingammen	42
Kvinen	43
Konsvik	44
Kokviken	45
Aspdalen	46
Tonnes	47
Kvarøen indre	48
Kvarøen ytre	49
Hestmoen	50
Nesøen søndre	51

== Government ==
Lurøy Municipality is responsible for primary education (through 10th grade), outpatient health services, senior citizen services, welfare and other social services, zoning, economic development, and municipal roads and utilities. The municipality is governed by a municipal council of directly elected representatives. The mayor is indirectly elected by a vote of the municipal council. The municipality is under the jurisdiction of the Helgeland District Court and the Hålogaland Court of Appeal.

=== Municipal council ===
The municipal council (Kommunestyre) of Lurøy Municipality is made up of 19 representatives that are elected to four year terms. The tables below show the current and historical composition of the council by political party.

Lurøy kommunestyre 2023–2027
Party name (in Norwegian)	Number of representatives
Labour Party (Arbeiderpartiet)	5
Progress Party (Fremskrittspartiet)	2
Conservative Party (Høyre)	7
Christian Democratic Party (Kristelig Folkeparti)	1
Coastal Party (Kystpartiet)	1
Centre Party (Senterpartiet)	3
Total number of members:	19

Lurøy kommunestyre 2019–2023
Party name (in Norwegian)	Number of representatives
Labour Party (Arbeiderpartiet)	6
Progress Party (Fremskrittspartiet)	2
Conservative Party (Høyre)	4
Coastal Party (Kystpartiet)	1
Centre Party (Senterpartiet)	6
Total number of members:	19

Lurøy kommunestyre 2015–2019
Party name (in Norwegian)	Number of representatives
Labour Party (Arbeiderpartiet)	6
Progress Party (Fremskrittspartiet)	1
Conservative Party (Høyre)	2
Christian Democratic Party (Kristelig Folkeparti)	1
Coastal Party (Kystpartiet)	2
Centre Party (Senterpartiet)	6
Lovund Cross-Party List (Lovund Tverrpolitiske Liste)	1
Total number of members:	19

Lurøy kommunestyre 2011–2015
Party name (in Norwegian)	Number of representatives
Labour Party (Arbeiderpartiet)	8
Progress Party (Fremskrittspartiet)	1
Conservative Party (Høyre)	3
Christian Democratic Party (Kristelig Folkeparti)	1
Coastal Party (Kystpartiet)	2
Centre Party (Senterpartiet)	2
Lovund Cross-Party List (Lovund Tverrpolitiske Liste)	2
Total number of members:	19

Lurøy kommunestyre 2007–2011
Party name (in Norwegian)	Number of representatives
Labour Party (Arbeiderpartiet)	7
Conservative Party (Høyre)	1
Christian Democratic Party (Kristelig Folkeparti)	1
Coastal Party (Kystpartiet)	4
Centre Party (Senterpartiet)	4
Liberal Party (Venstre)	1
Lovund cross-party list (Lovund tverrpolitiske liste)	1
Total number of members:	19

Lurøy kommunestyre 2003–2007
Party name (in Norwegian)	Number of representatives
Labour Party (Arbeiderpartiet)	8
Conservative Party (Høyre)	1
Christian Democratic Party (Kristelig Folkeparti)	1
Coastal Party (Kystpartiet)	3
Centre Party (Senterpartiet)	3
Liberal Party (Venstre)	1
Lovund cross-party list (Lovund Tverrpolitiske Liste)	2
Total number of members:	19

Lurøy kommunestyre 1999–2003
Party name (in Norwegian)	Number of representatives
Conservative Party (Høyre)	1
Christian Democratic Party (Kristelig Folkeparti)	1
Coastal Party (Kystpartiet)	3
Centre Party (Senterpartiet)	5
Liberal Party (Venstre)	1
Joint list of the Labour Party (Arbeiderpartiet) and the Socialist Left Party (Sosialistisk Venstreparti)	8
Total number of members:	19

Lurøy kommunestyre 1995–1999
Party name (in Norwegian)	Number of representatives
Conservative Party (Høyre)	2
Christian Democratic Party (Kristelig Folkeparti)	1
Centre Party (Senterpartiet)	8
Liberal Party (Venstre)	2
Joint list of the Labour Party (Arbeiderpartiet) and the Socialist Left Party (Sosialistisk Venstreparti)	10
Total number of members:	23

Lurøy kommunestyre 1991–1995
Party name (in Norwegian)	Number of representatives
Labour Party (Arbeiderpartiet)	7
Conservative Party (Høyre)	3
Christian Democratic Party (Kristelig Folkeparti)	1
Centre Party (Senterpartiet)	7
Socialist Left Party (Sosialistisk Venstreparti)	2
Liberal Party (Venstre)	1
Total number of members:	21

Lurøy kommunestyre 1987–1991
Party name (in Norwegian)	Number of representatives
Labour Party (Arbeiderpartiet)	9
Progress Party (Fremskrittspartiet)	1
Conservative Party (Høyre)	3
Christian Democratic Party (Kristelig Folkeparti)	1
Centre Party (Senterpartiet)	4
Socialist Left Party (Sosialistisk Venstreparti)	1
Liberal Party (Venstre)	1
Cross-party election list for Aas school area (Tverrpolitisk valgliste for Aas skolekrets)	1
Total number of members:	21

Lurøy kommunestyre 1983–1987
Party name (in Norwegian)	Number of representatives
Labour Party (Arbeiderpartiet)	10
Conservative Party (Høyre)	4
Christian Democratic Party (Kristelig Folkeparti)	2
Joint list of the Centre Party (Senterpartiet) and the Liberal Party (Venstre)	5
Total number of members:	21

Lurøy kommunestyre 1979–1983
Party name (in Norwegian)	Number of representatives
Conservative Party (Høyre)	4
Christian Democratic Party (Kristelig Folkeparti)	3
Election list for the Lurøy interior and Aldra (Valgliste for Lurøy innland og Aldra)	6
Election list for the Gnog, Lurøy, Kvarøy and Sornesøy areas (Valgliste for Gnog, Lurøy, Kvarøy og Sornesøy kretser)	5
Election list for the Moflag area (Valgliste for Moflag krets)	2
Lovund local list (Lovund kretsliste)	1
Total number of members:	21

Lurøy kommunestyre 1975–1979
Party name (in Norwegian)	Number of representatives
Election list for the Lurøy interior, Aldra, and Kvarøy (Valgliste for Lurøy innland, Aldra, og Kvarøy)	9
Election list for the Onøy, Lurøy, Kvarøy and Sornesøy areas (Valgliste for Onøy, Lurøy, Kvarøy og Sornesøy kretser)	6
Election list for the Moflag and North Solvær areas (Valgliste for Moflag og Nord-Solvær krets)	4
Lovund local list (Lovund kretsliste)	2
Total number of members:	21

Lurøy kommunestyre 1971–1975
Party name (in Norwegian)	Number of representatives
Local List(s) (Lokale lister)	21
Total number of members:	21

Lurøy kommunestyre 1967–1971
Party name (in Norwegian)	Number of representatives
Labour Party (Arbeiderpartiet)	2
Joint List(s) of Non-Socialist Parties (Borgerlige Felleslister)	2
Local List(s) (Lokale lister)	17
Total number of members:	21

Lurøy kommunestyre 1963–1967
Party name (in Norwegian)	Number of representatives
Labour Party (Arbeiderpartiet)	6
Joint List(s) of Non-Socialist Parties (Borgerlige Felleslister)	2
Local List(s) (Lokale lister)	13
Total number of members:	21

Lurøy herredsstyre 1959–1963
Party name (in Norwegian)	Number of representatives
Labour Party (Arbeiderpartiet)	6
Conservative Party (Høyre)	1
Local List(s) (Lokale lister)	14
Total number of members:	21

Lurøy herredsstyre 1955–1959
Party name (in Norwegian)	Number of representatives
Labour Party (Arbeiderpartiet)	8
Conservative Party (Høyre)	1
Joint List(s) of Non-Socialist Parties (Borgerlige Felleslister)	5
Local List(s) (Lokale lister)	7
Total number of members:	21

Lurøy herredsstyre 1951–1955
Party name (in Norwegian)	Number of representatives
Labour Party (Arbeiderpartiet)	8
Conservative Party (Høyre)	2
Local List(s) (Lokale lister)	10
Total number of members:	20

Lurøy herredsstyre 1947–1951
Party name (in Norwegian)	Number of representatives
Labour Party (Arbeiderpartiet)	9
Joint List(s) of Non-Socialist Parties (Borgerlige Felleslister)	7
Local List(s) (Lokale lister)	4
Total number of members:	20

Lurøy herredsstyre 1945–1947
Party name (in Norwegian)	Number of representatives
Labour Party (Arbeiderpartiet)	11
Christian Democratic Party (Kristelig Folkeparti)	1
Joint List(s) of Non-Socialist Parties (Borgerlige Felleslister)	7
Local List(s) (Lokale lister)	1
Total number of members:	20

Lurøy herredsstyre 1937–1941*
Party name (in Norwegian)	Number of representatives
Labour Party (Arbeiderpartiet)	6
List of workers, fishermen, and small farmholders (Arbeidere, fiskere, småbrukere liste)	2
Joint List(s) of Non-Socialist Parties (Borgerlige Felleslister)	4
Local List(s) (Lokale lister)	8
Total number of members:	20
Note: Due to the German occupation of Norway during World War II, no elections were held for new municipal councils until after the war ended in 1945.

=== Mayors ===
The mayor (Norwegian: ordfører) of Lurøy Municipality is the political leader of the municipality and the chairperson of the municipal council. Here is a list of people who have held this position:

- 1838–1840: Christian Eilert Rasch
- 1840–1845: Daniel Strøm Dundas
- 1846–1850: Carl Nicolai Bugge
- 1850–1854: Benjamin Olsen
- 1854–1860: Jeremias Willichsen
- 1860–1864: John Erik Steffensen
- 1865–1865: Paul Christian Føyn
- 1865–1866: Jens Christian Pettersen Tønder
- 1867–1869: John Erik Steffensen
- 1869–1870: Cornelius Eitran
- 1871–1875: Iver Olsen Riise
- 1875–1881: Knut Hansen
- 1881–1884: Anders Knutsen
- 1885–1886: Laurits Torgersen
- 1886–1886: Martin Israelsen
- 1887–1896: Mathias Knutsen
- 1896–1922: Isak Dundas
- 1922–1941: Jakob Victor Hansen
- 1941–1943: Fredrik Thorstein Krüger
- 1943–1945: Peder Larsen
- 1945–1947: Aubert Jentoft
- 1947–1961: Torvald Brandser
- 1961–1963: Ivar Riise
- 1963–1971: Torleif Hansen
- 1971–1973: Per Rise
- 1973–1975: Egil Fjellgård
- 1975–1978: Nils Nermark
- 1979–1988: Johannes Bentzen (Sp)
- 1988–2007: Steinar A. Joakimsen (Ap)
- 2007–2011: Carl Einar Isachsen, Jr. (Sp)
- 2011–2015: Bjørnar Skjæran (Ap)
- 2015–2019: Carl Einar Isachsen, Jr. (Sp)
- 2019–present: Håkon Lund (H)

== Media gallery ==
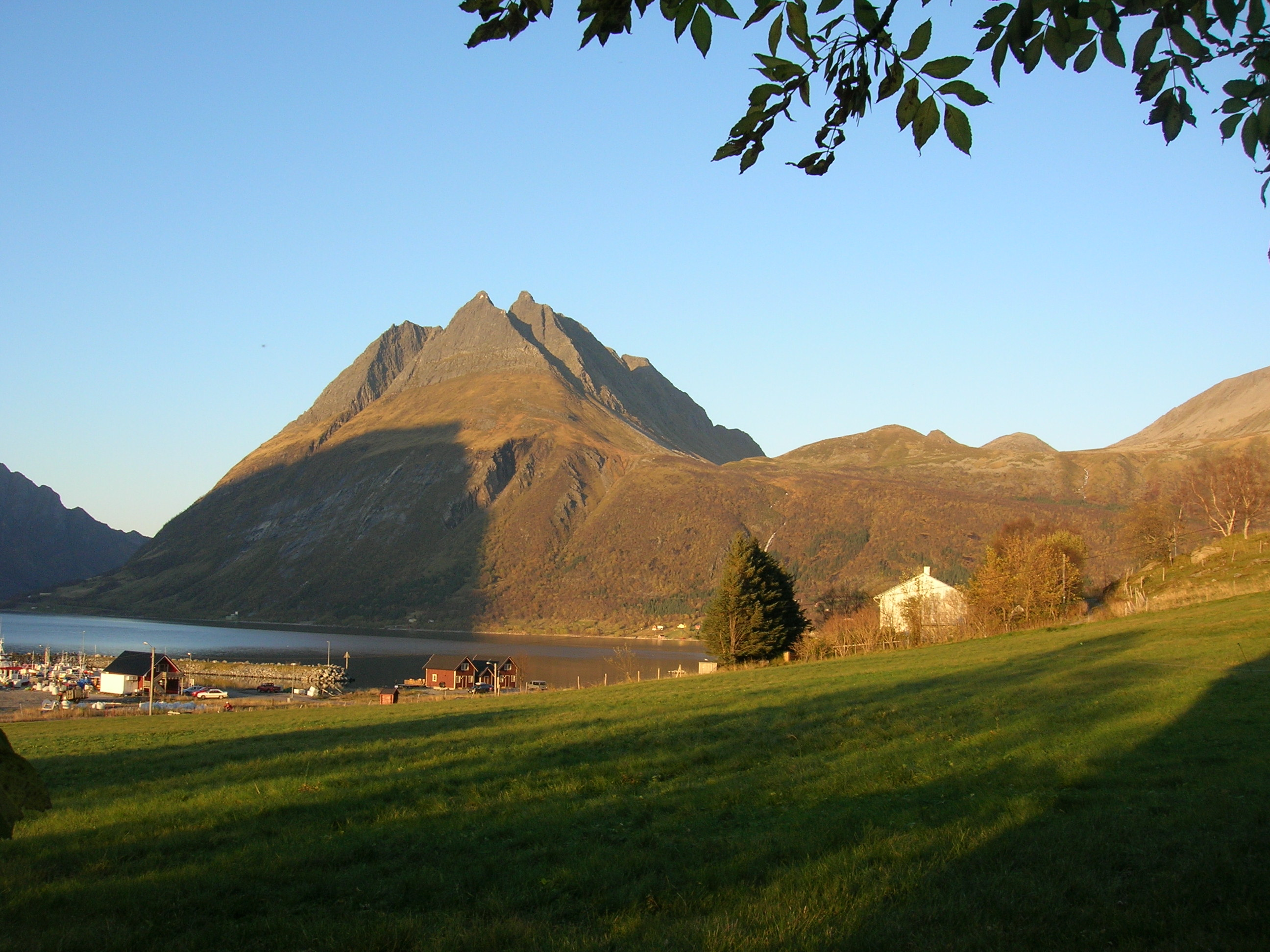
Aldersundet strait and Aldra island; October 8, 2005

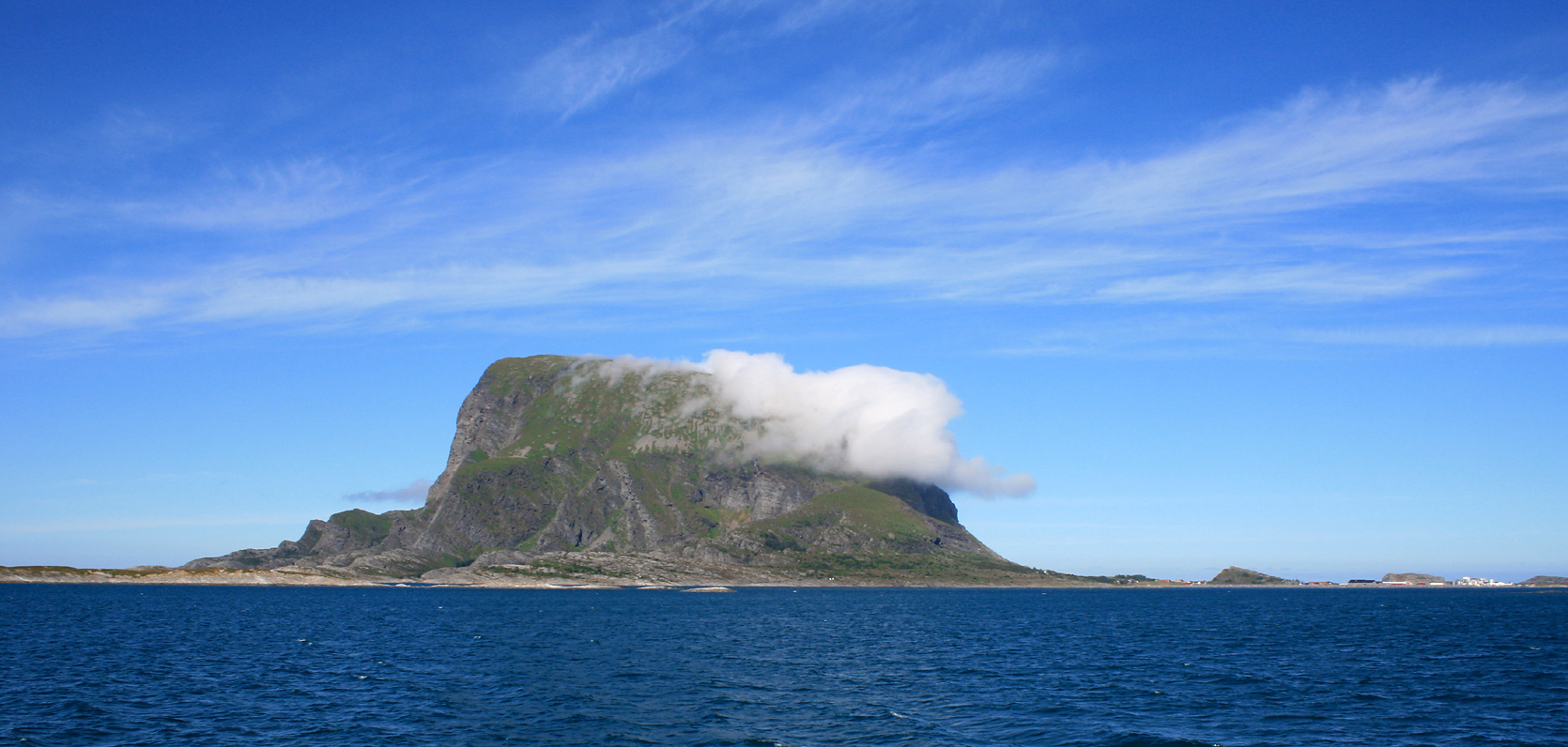
The island Lovund with its puffin colony is located in Lurøy

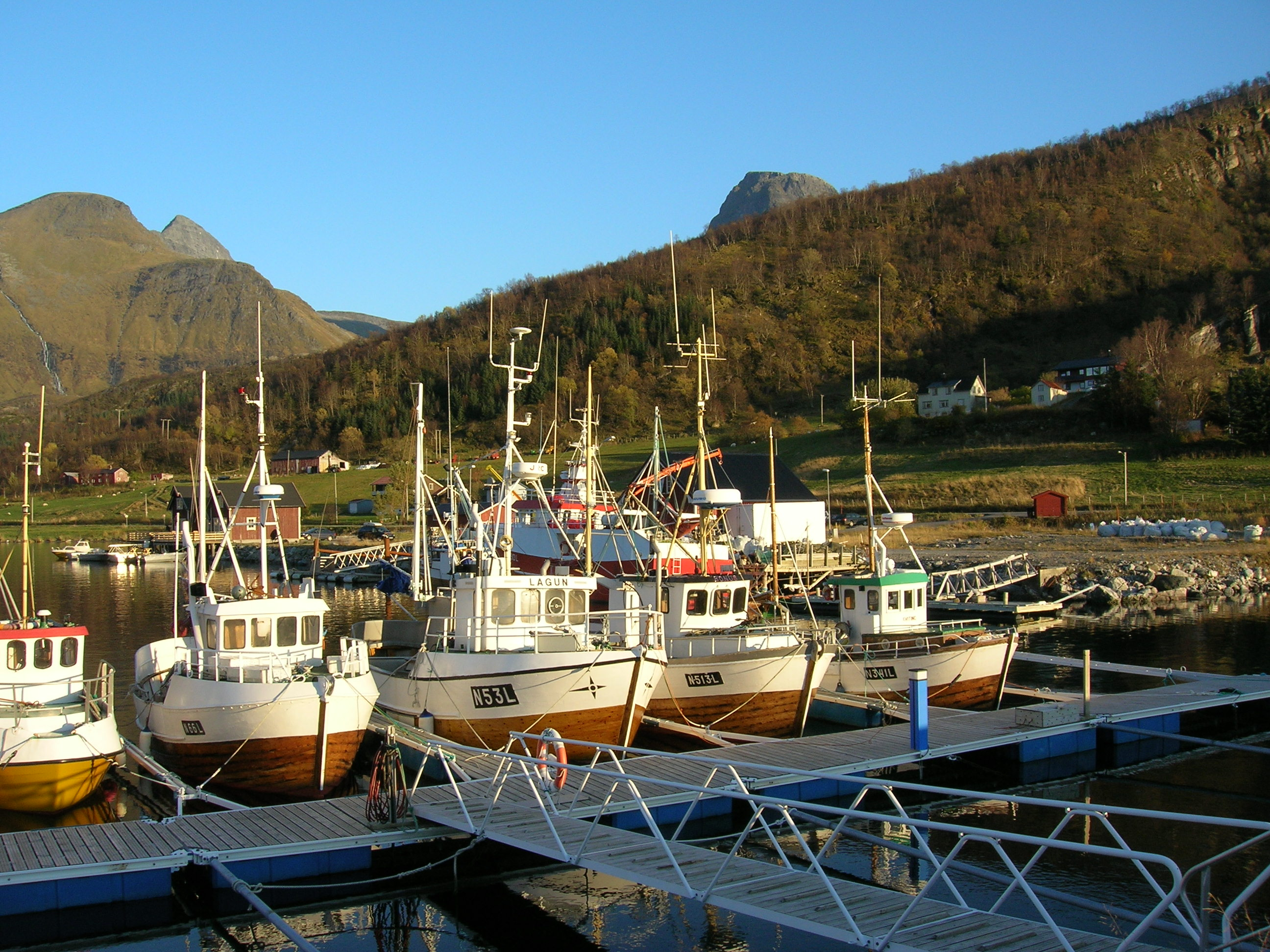
Aldersundet, October 2005

== Notable people ==
- Harry Johan Olai Klippenvåg (1913 in Lurøy – 1994), a Norwegian politician, Mayor of Sør-Varanger in 1940's & 50's
- Herluf Nygaard (1916 in Lurøy – 2001), a Norwegian military officer, active resistance fighter during WWII
