= Stigen, Nordland =

Island in Nordland, Norway

Stigen
- Interactive map of Stigen

Geography
- Location: Nordland, Norway
- Coordinates: 66.4202°N 12.9327°E
- Area: 13.5 km^{2} (5.2 sq mi)
- Length: 8.6 km (5.34 mi)
- Width: 2.3 km (1.43 mi)
- Highest elevation: 380 m (1250 ft)
- Highest point: Stigen

Administration
- Norway
- County: Nordland
- Municipality: Lurøy Municipality

Demographics
- Population: 5 (2017)

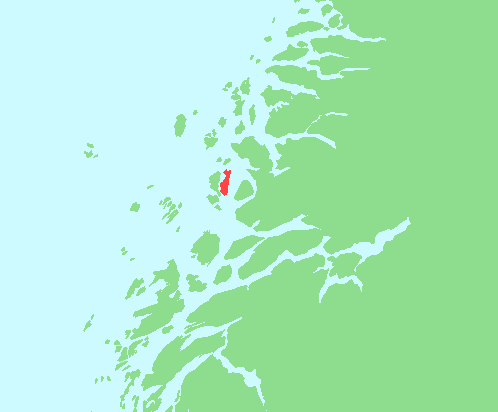

Stigen (nicknamed: Østre Lurøya or Eastern Lurøya) is an island in Lurøy Municipality in Nordland county, Norway. The 13.5-square-kilometre (5.2 sq mi) island lies immediately east of the island of Lurøya and northeast of the island of Onøya. The island has a population of 5 (in 2017). There are no road connections to the island. The highest point on the island is the 380-metre (1,250 ft) tall mountain that is also known as Stigen.

== See also ==
- List of islands of Norway
