= Lovund =

Island in Nordland, Norway

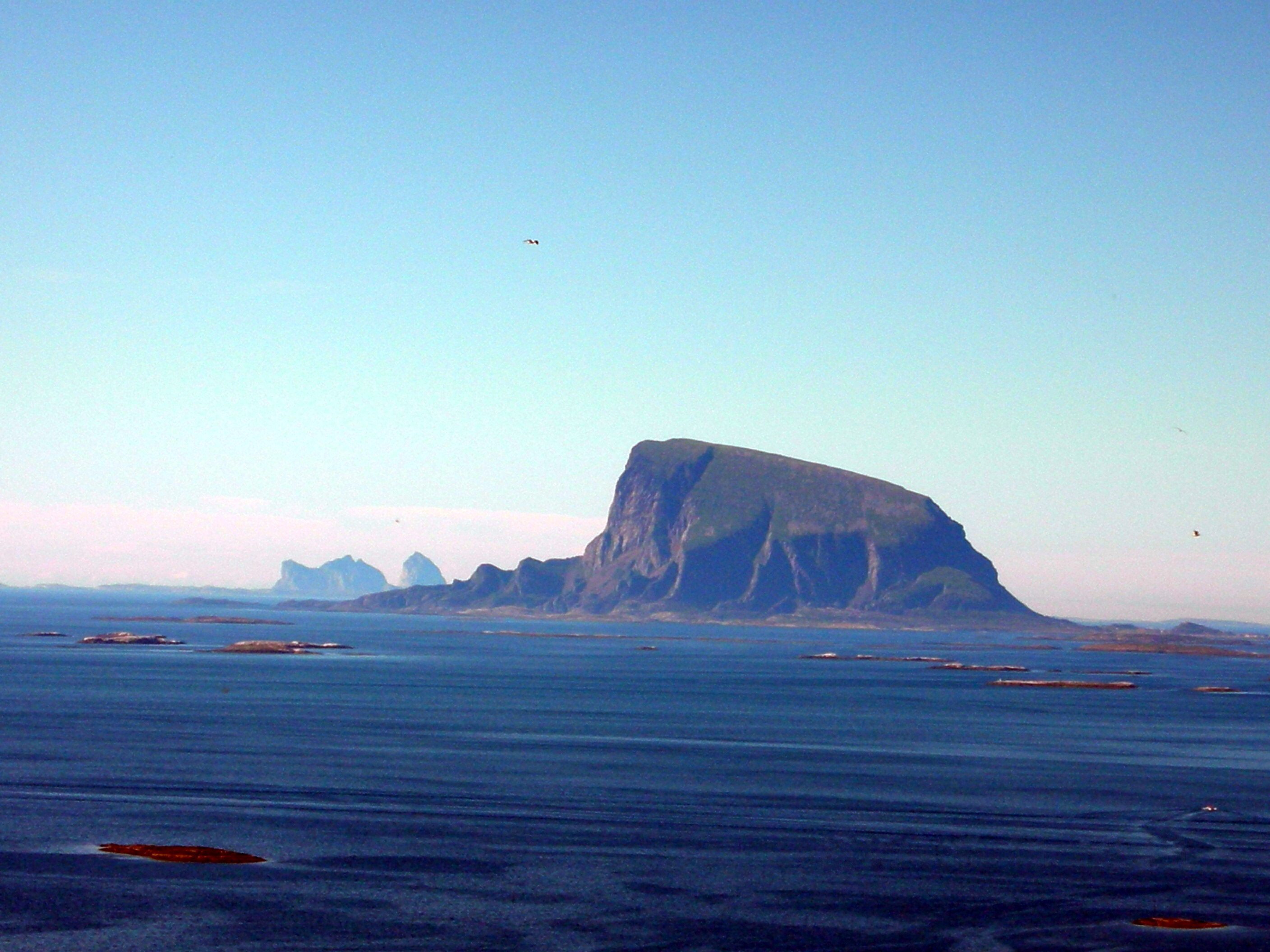
- Lovund with the islands of Træna Municipality in the background
- Interactive map of Lovund

Geography
- Location: Nordland, Norway
- Coordinates: 66.3641°N 12.3372°E
- Area: 4.9 km^{2} (1.9 sq mi)
- Length: 3 km (1.9 mi)
- Width: 2.5 km (1.55 mi)
- Highest elevation: 623 m (2044 ft)
- Highest point: Lovundfjellet

Administration
- Norway
- County: Nordland
- Municipality: Lurøy Municipality

Demographics
- Population: 499 (2018)

Lovund is an island and village in Lurøy Municipality in Nordland county, Norway. The island is located west of the Solvær islands and southeast of Træna Municipality, a neighboring island municipality. Lovund is notable for the large puffin breeding colony located on the rocky north slope of the island.

The village of Lovund (also known as Strand) is located in the northeastern part of the island. The 0.53-square-kilometre (130-acre) village has a population (2023) of 512 and a population density of 966 inhabitants per square kilometre (2,500/sq mi). Lovund Church, located in the village, serves the people of the island.

In June 2024 a new museum was opened to house the oaken Lovund Boat, dated around 1460, close to where its wreck was found. The remnants had been raised from the sandy bottom in 2017. The state of preservation was sufficient to enable a full-scale replica to be made, including tarred wool for keeping the vessel watertight.

== Name ==
The island is named after the old Lovund farm (Old Norse: Laufund). The first element is lauf which means "leaf" or "broad-leaved trees", referring to the fact that the western part of the island is covered with a forest. The last element is the suffix -und meaning "land".

== Media gallery ==
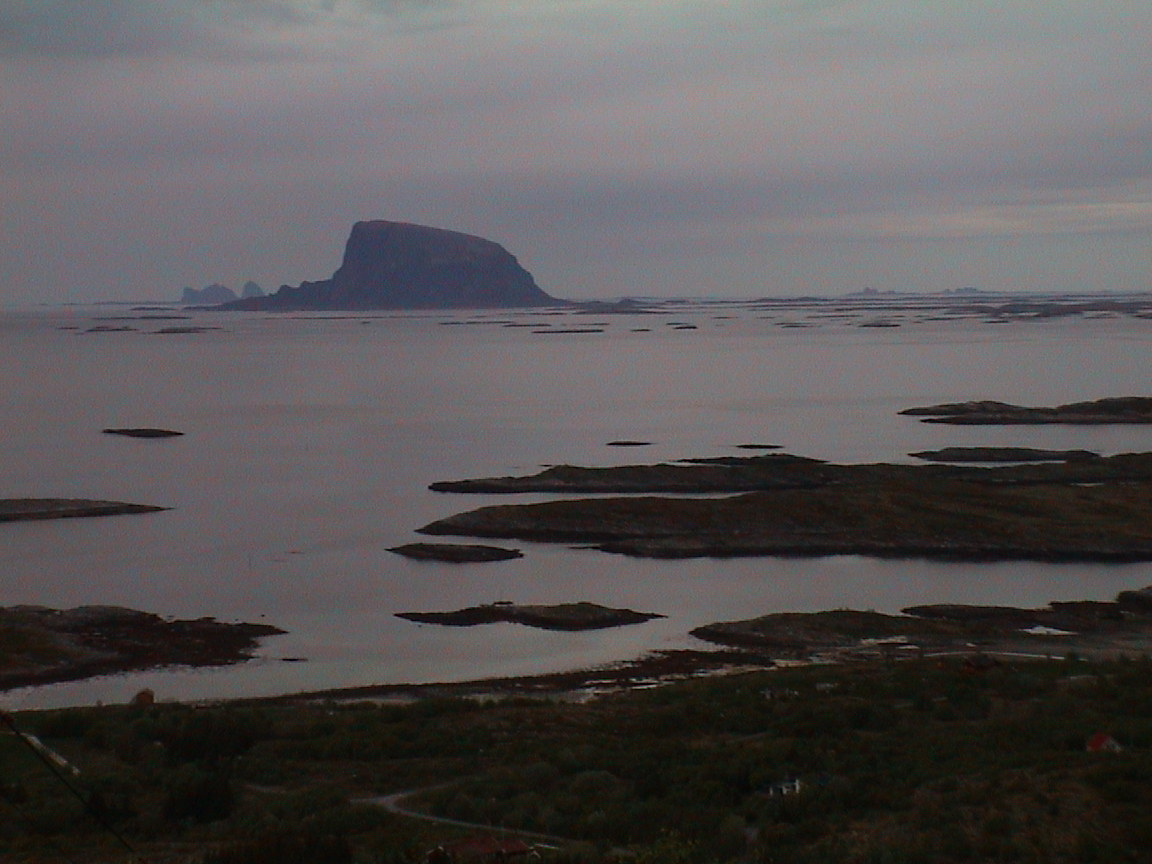
Lovund seen from Dønna

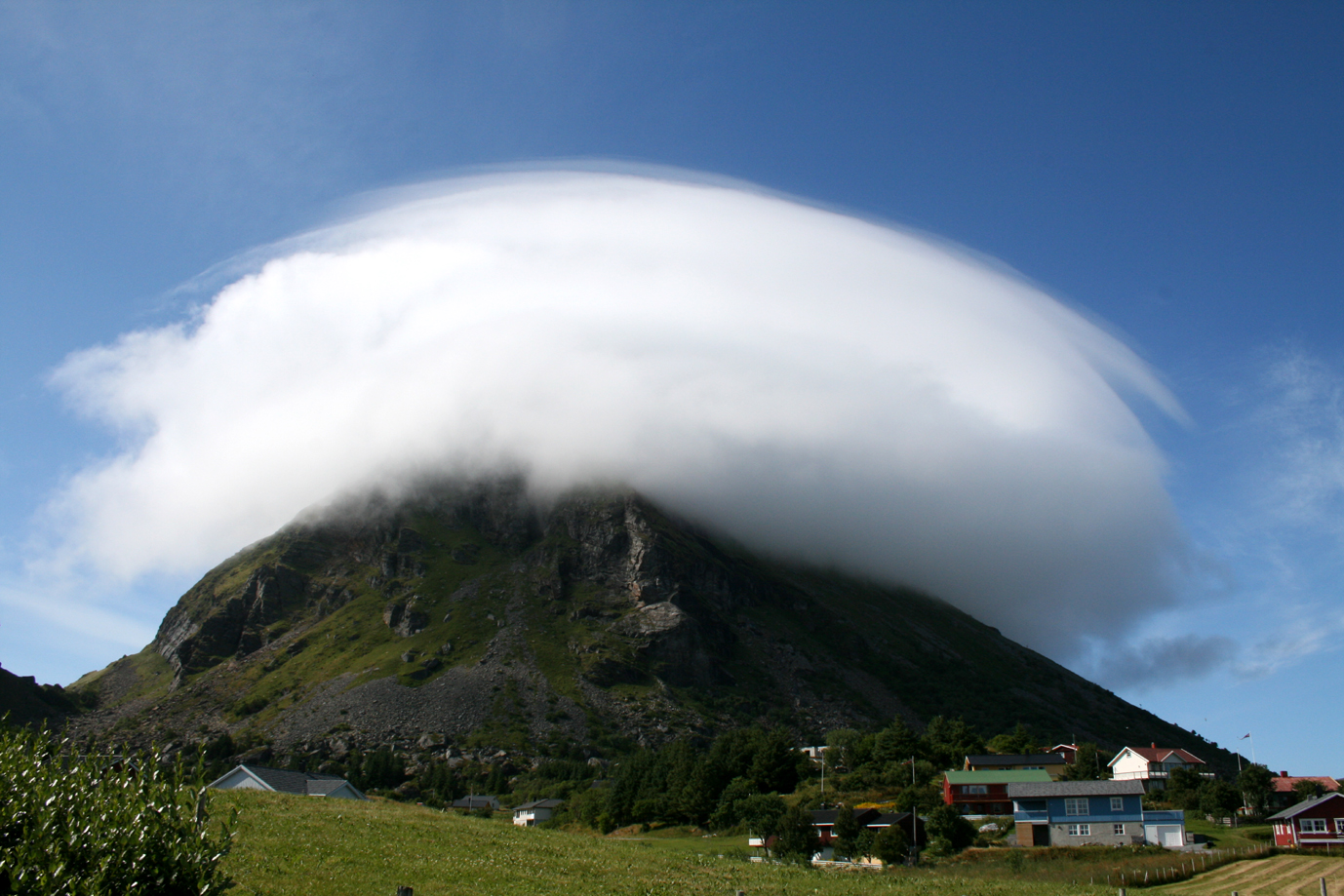
Lovund village

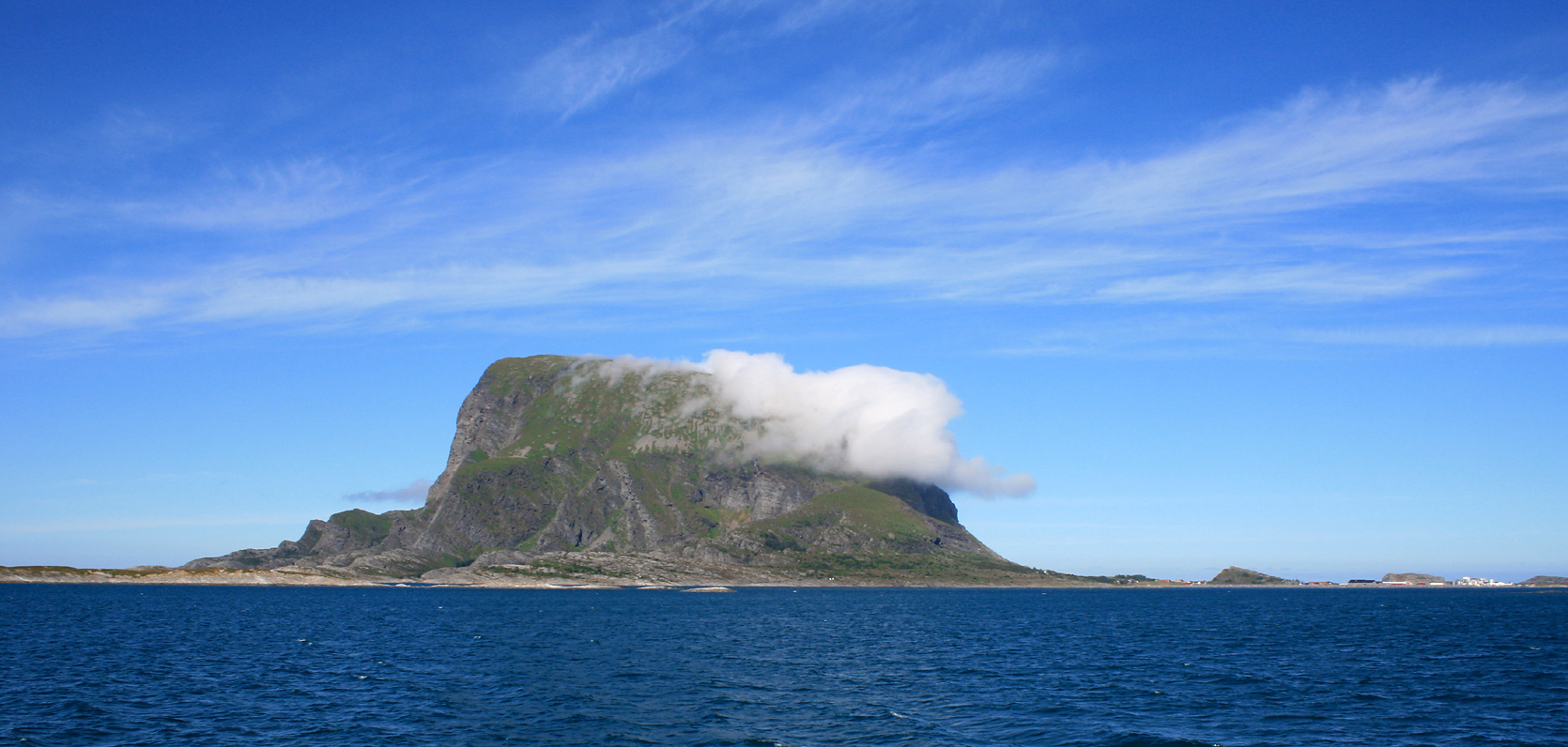
View of the island

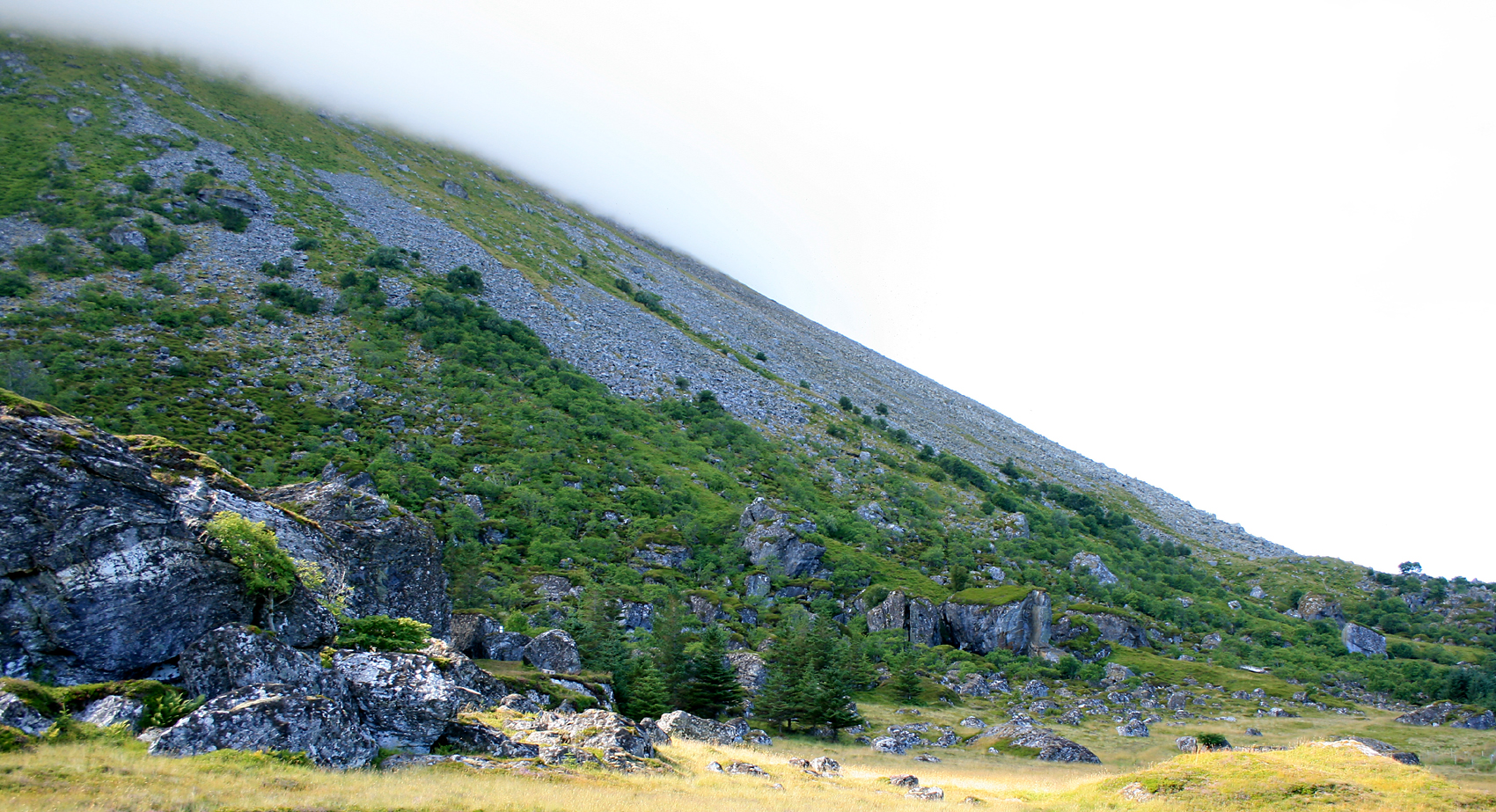
Lundeura - location of the puffin colony

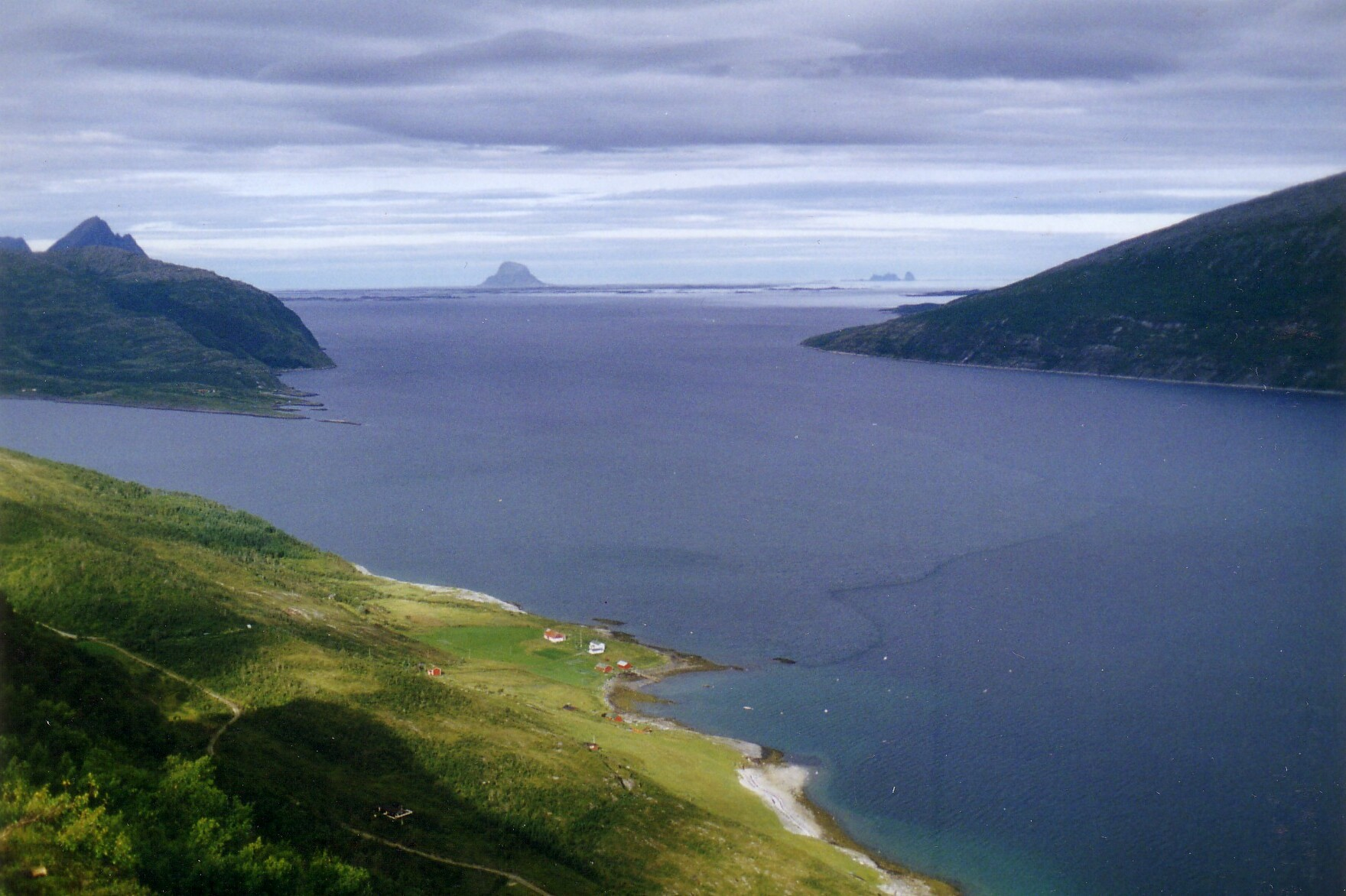
View near Nesna, Norway, showing the settlement of Lillevik in the foreground. The island of Lovund in the distant horizon.
