= Onøya =

Island in Lurøy, Norway

- Interactive map of Onøya

Geography
- Location: Nordland, Norway
- Coordinates: 66.3870°N 12.8539°E
- Area: 7.7 km^{2} (3.0 sq mi)
- Length: 4.2 km (2.61 mi)
- Width: 3.8 km (2.36 mi)
- Highest elevation: 197 m (646 ft)
- Highest point: Stokksvikfjellet

Administration
- Norway
- County: Nordland
- Municipality: Lurøy Municipality

Demographics
- Population: 279 (2017)

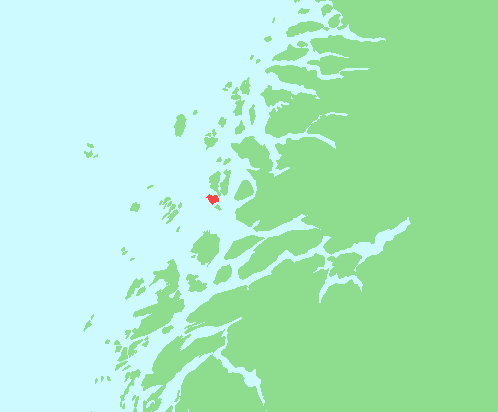
Locator map of Onøya, Nordland, Norway

Onøya is an island in Lurøy Municipality in Nordland county, Norway. The administrative centre of Lurøy Municipality is located on the northwestern coast of the island.

The 7.7-square-kilometre (3.0 sq mi) island lies immediately south of the island of Lurøya and southwest of the island of Stigen. The island is connected to Lurøya by a short bridge. Onøya sits just west of the mouth of the Sjona fjord. It is only accessible by boat. The highest point on the island is the 197-metre (646 ft) tall mountain Stokksvikfjellet. In 2017, there were 279 residents of the island.

== See also ==
- List of islands of Norway
