= Lurøya, Nordland =

Island in Nordland, Norway

Lurøya Lurøy
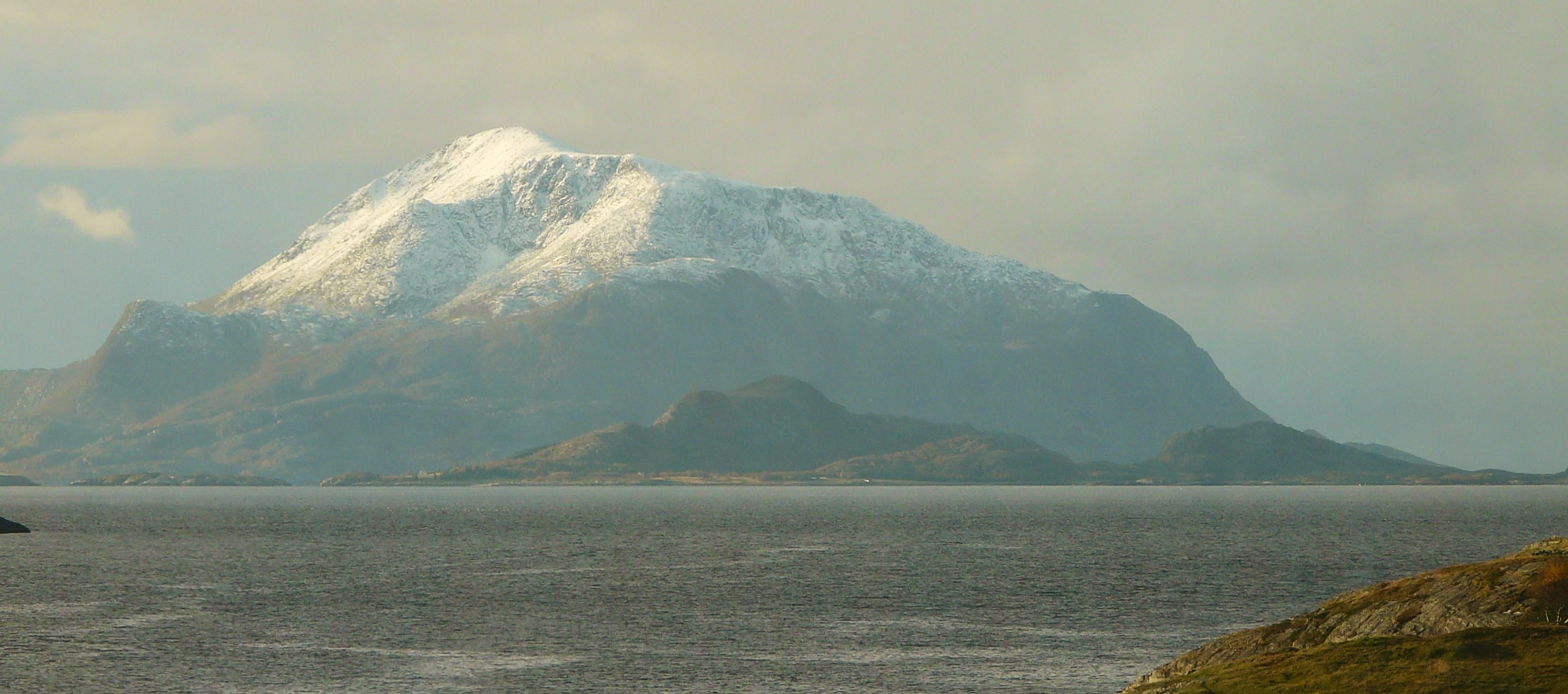
- View of the mountain Lurøyfjellet on Lurøya
- Interactive map of Lurøya; Lurøy

Geography
- Location: Nordland, Norway
- Coordinates: 66.4187°N 12.8789°E
- Area: 14.2 km^{2} (5.5 sq mi)
- Length: 6 km (3.7 mi)
- Width: 3.5 km (2.17 mi)
- Highest elevation: 685 m (2247 ft)
- Highest point: Lurøyfjellet

Administration
- Norway
- County: Nordland
- Municipality: Lurøy Municipality

Demographics
- Population: 138 (2017)
- Pop. density: 9.7/km^{2} (25.1/sq mi)

Lurøya is an island in Lurøy Municipality in Nordland county, Norway. The 14.2-square-kilometre (5.5 sq mi) island is located just west of the island of Stigen and just north of the island of Onøya. Lurøya has a bridge connection to Onøya. The highest point on the island is the 685-metre (2,247 ft) tall mountain Lurøyfjellet. In 2017, there were 138 residents of the island.

The village of Lurøy is located on the southwestern coast of Lurøya. Lurøy Church is located in the village of Lurøy.

== See also ==
- List of islands of Norway
