= Træna =

Træna or Traena may refer to:

== Places ==
- Træna Municipality, a municipality in Nordland county, Norway
- Træna Lighthouse, a lighthouse in Træna Municipality in Nordland county, Norway
- Træna Church, a church in Træna Municipality in Nordland county, Norway
- Træna (archipelago), a group of islands in Træna Municipality in Nordland county, Norway
- Træna, Vestland, a small farm village in Alver Municipality in Vestland county, Norway

== Other ==
- Traena Music Festival, a music festival in Træna Municipality in Nordland county, Norway
