= Nergaard Peak =

Mountain in Queen Maud Land, Antarctica

Nergaard Peak (Norwegian: Nergaardnuten) (72°0′S 9°27′E) is a peak (2,475 m) located 3 nautical miles (6 km) south of Niels Peak (Nielsnapen) in the Gagarin Mountains of Queen Maud Land. It was mapped by Norwegian cartographers from air photos and surveys by the Norwegian Antarctic Expedition, 1956–60. Both Nergaard Peak and Niels Peak are named for Niels Nergaard, a scientific assistant with the Norwegian Antarctic Expedition, 1956–58. Both names were proposed in 1967 by the Norwegian philologist Per Hovda (1908–1997).
