= Niels Peak =

Mountain in Queen Maud Land, Antarctica

Niels Peak (Norwegian: Nielsnapen) (71°57′S 9°23′E) is a peak, 2,525 m, rising 3 nautical miles (6 km) north of Nergaard Peak (Nergaardnuten) in the Gagarin Mountains of the Orvin Mountains, Queen Maud Land. Mapped by Norwegian cartographers from air photos and surveys by the Norwegian Antarctic Expedition, 1956–60. Both Nergaard Peak and Niels Peak are named for Niels Nergaard, a scientific assistant with the Norwegian Antarctic Expedition, 1956–58. Both names were proposed in 1967 by the Norwegian philologist Per Hovda (1908–1997).
