= Fiskernes Chapel =

Church in Nordland, Norway

- Fiskernes bedehuskapell
- Fiskernes Chapel
- 66.58810577°N 12.24058941°E
- Location: Træna Municipality, Nordland
- Country: Norway
- Denomination: Church of Norway
- Churchmanship: Evangelical Lutheran

History
- Status: Chapel
- Founded: 1887

Architecture
- Functional status: Active
- Architect: A. B. Jurgensen
- Architectural type: Long church
- Completed: 1887 (139 years ago)

Specifications
- Capacity: 30
- Materials: Wood

Administration
- Diocese: Sør-Hålogaland
- Deanery: Nord-Helgeland prosti
- Parish: Træna

Fiskernes Chapel (Norwegian: Fiskernes bedehuskapell) is a chapel of the Church of Norway in Træna Municipality in Nordland county, Norway. It is located on the island/village of Selvær. It is an annex chapel in the Træna parish which is part of the Nord-Helgeland prosti (deanery) in the Diocese of Sør-Hålogaland. The white, wooden chapel was built in a long church style in 1887 using plans drawn up by the architect A. B. Jurgensen. The chapel seats about 30 people.

== See also ==
- List of churches in Sør-Hålogaland
