= Husøya =

Island in Norway

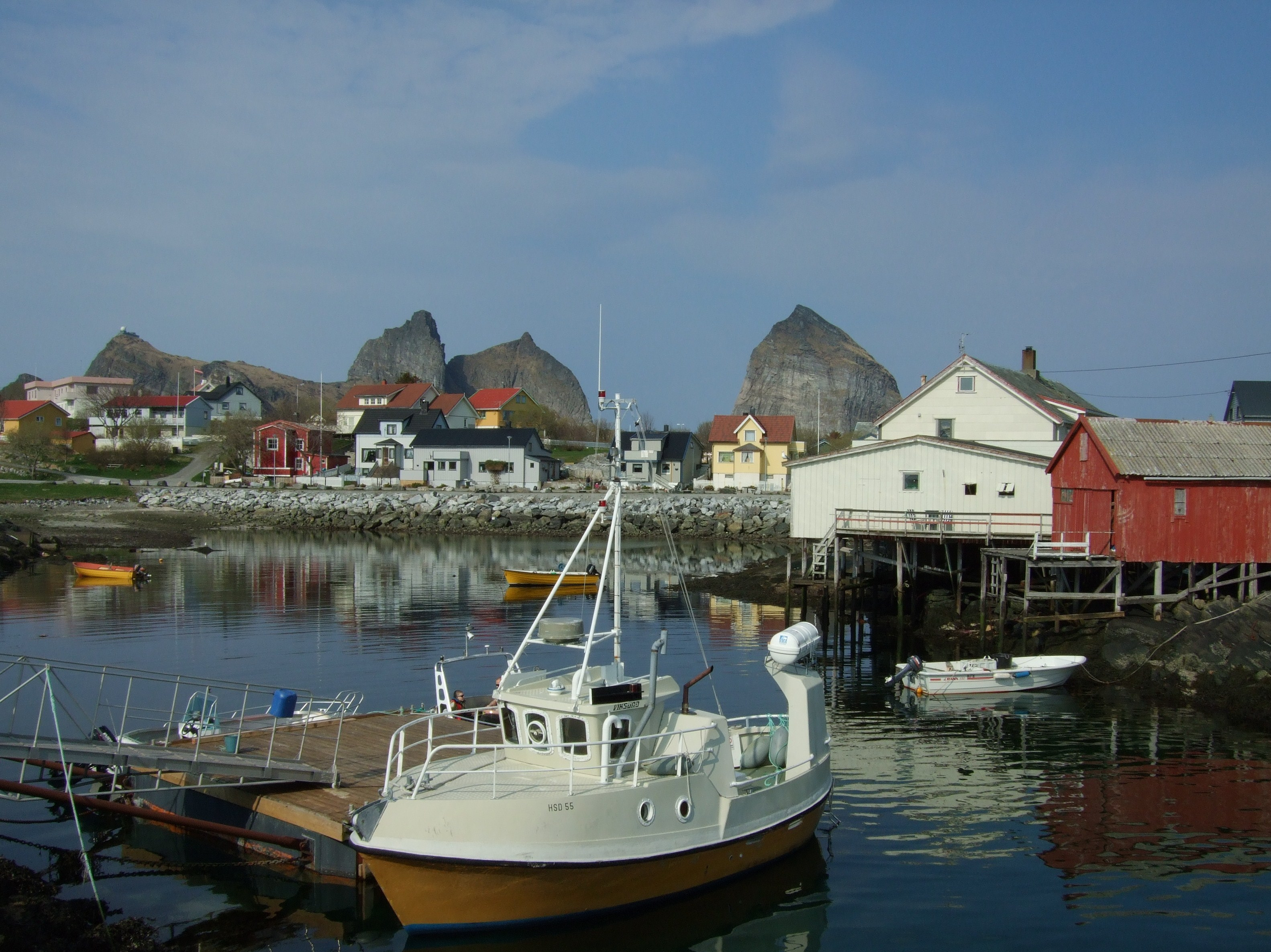
- Husøya harbor with the Sanna mountains in the background.
- Interactive map of Husøya

Geography
- Location: Nordland, Norway
- Coordinates: 66.4954°N 12.0749°E
- Area: 1.5 km^{2} (0.58 sq mi)
- Length: 2.5 km (1.55 mi)
- Width: 1 km (0.6 mi)
- Highest elevation: 47 m (154 ft)
- Highest point: Støttberget

Administration
- Norway
- County: Nordland
- Municipality: Træna Municipality

Demographics
- Population: 382 (2023)

Husøya is a small island and the administrative centre of Træna Municipality in Nordland county, Norway. It is located just east of the island of Sanna in the Trænfjorden, about 20 kilometres (12 mi) northwest of the island of Lovund (in neighboring Lurøy Municipality) and about 12 kilometres (7.5 mi) south of Selvær. The Træna Lighthouse lies south of the island. The island is only accessible by boat, and there is regular ferry service from Husøya to the island of Selvær and to Stokkvågen on the mainland.

Most of the flat island is made up of the village of Husøya, which is the administrative centre of the municipality. It is the location of Træna Church. The 0.42-square-kilometre (100-acre) village has a population (2023) of 382 and a population density of 910 inhabitants per square kilometre (2,400/sq mi).

The annual Træna Music Festival is held here and on the neighboring island of Sanna.

== Media gallery ==
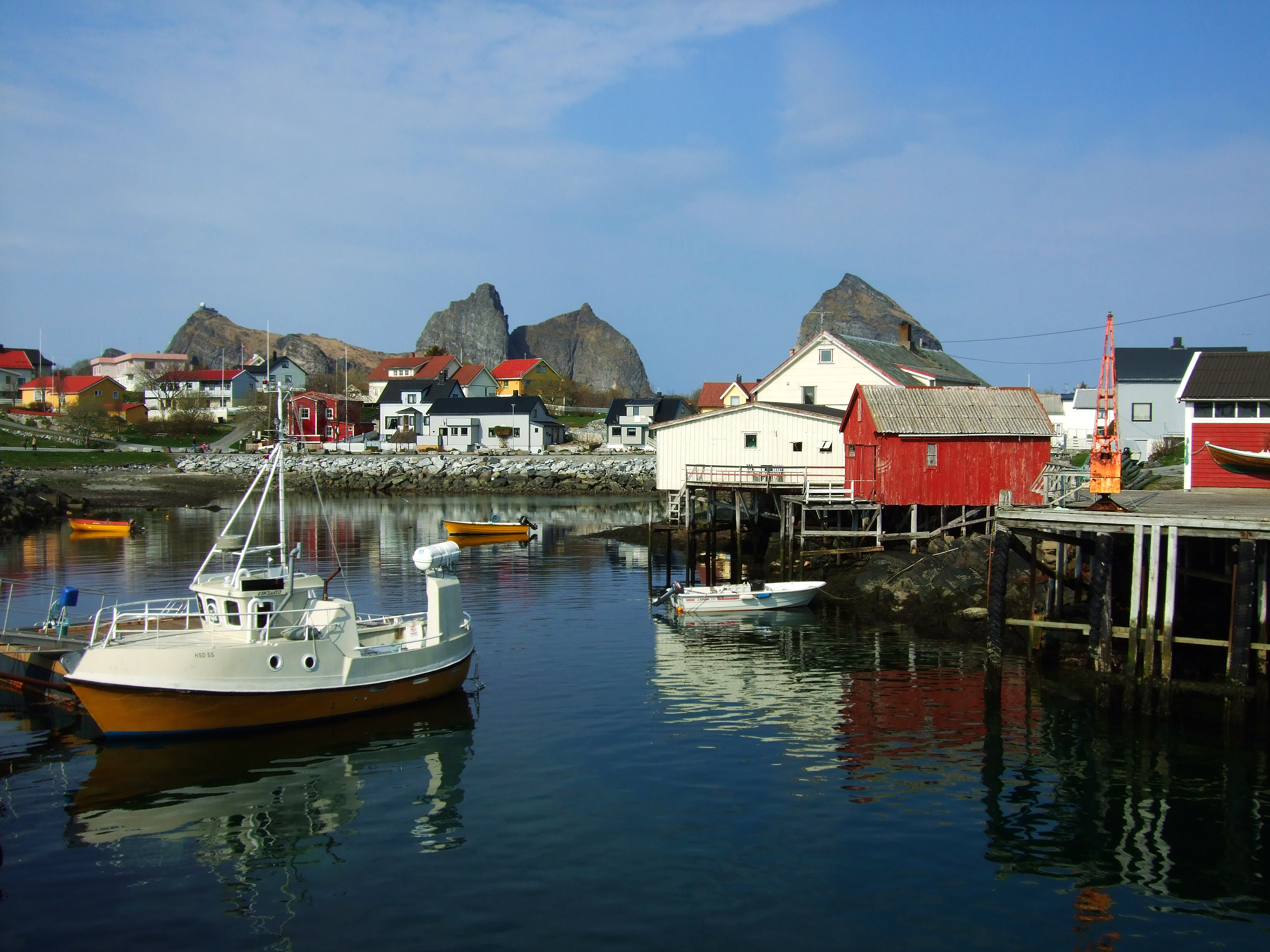

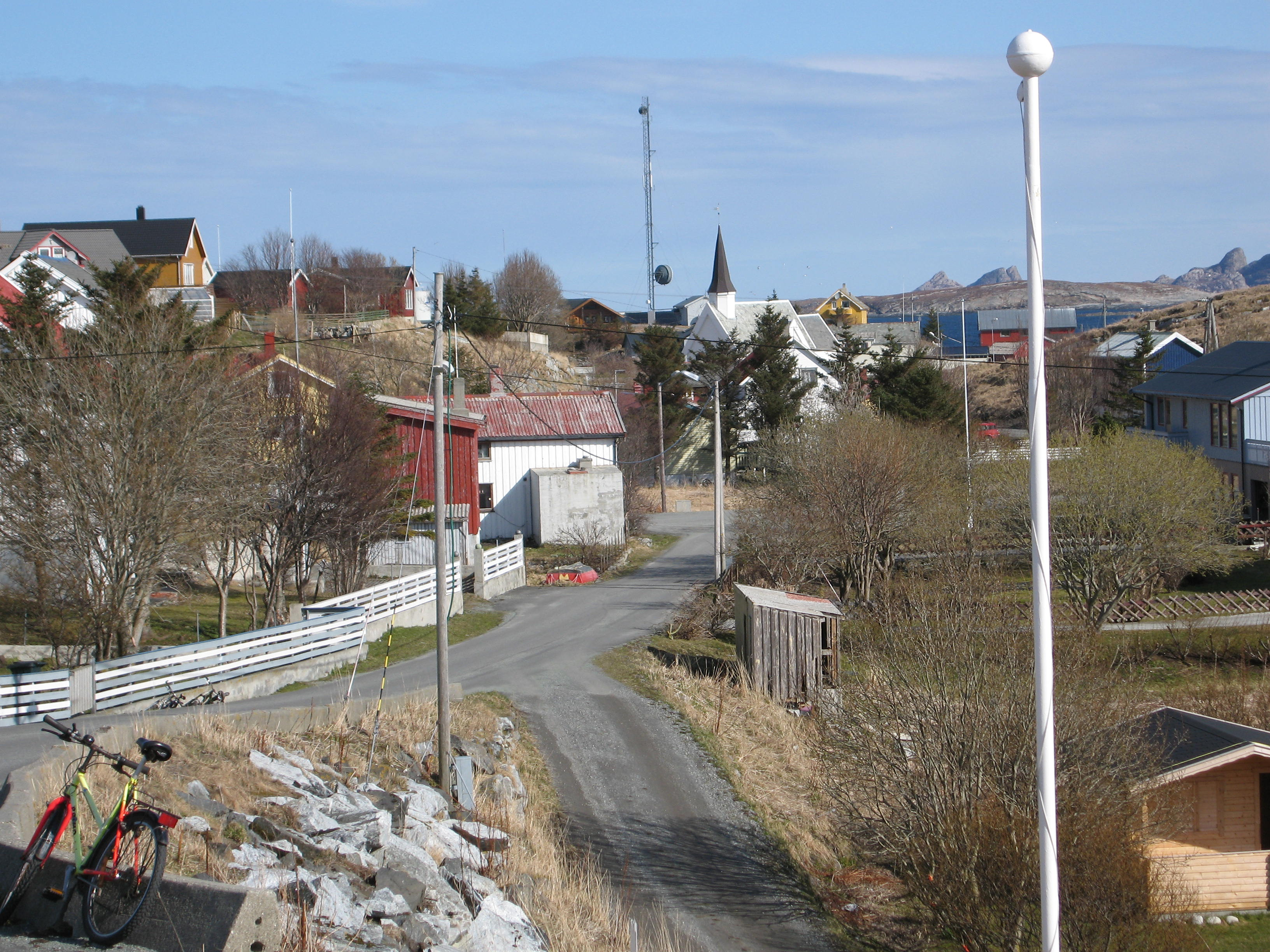

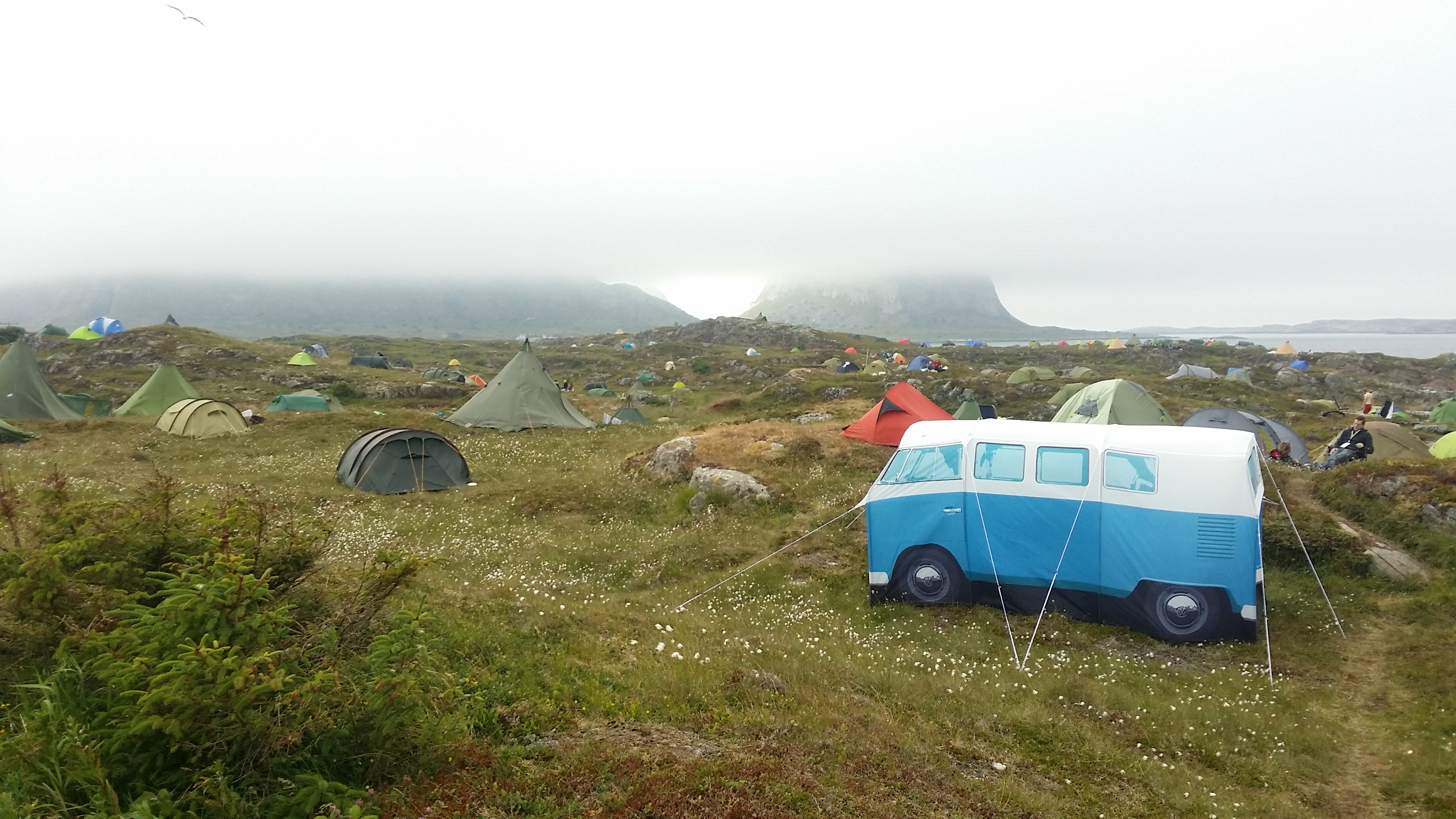

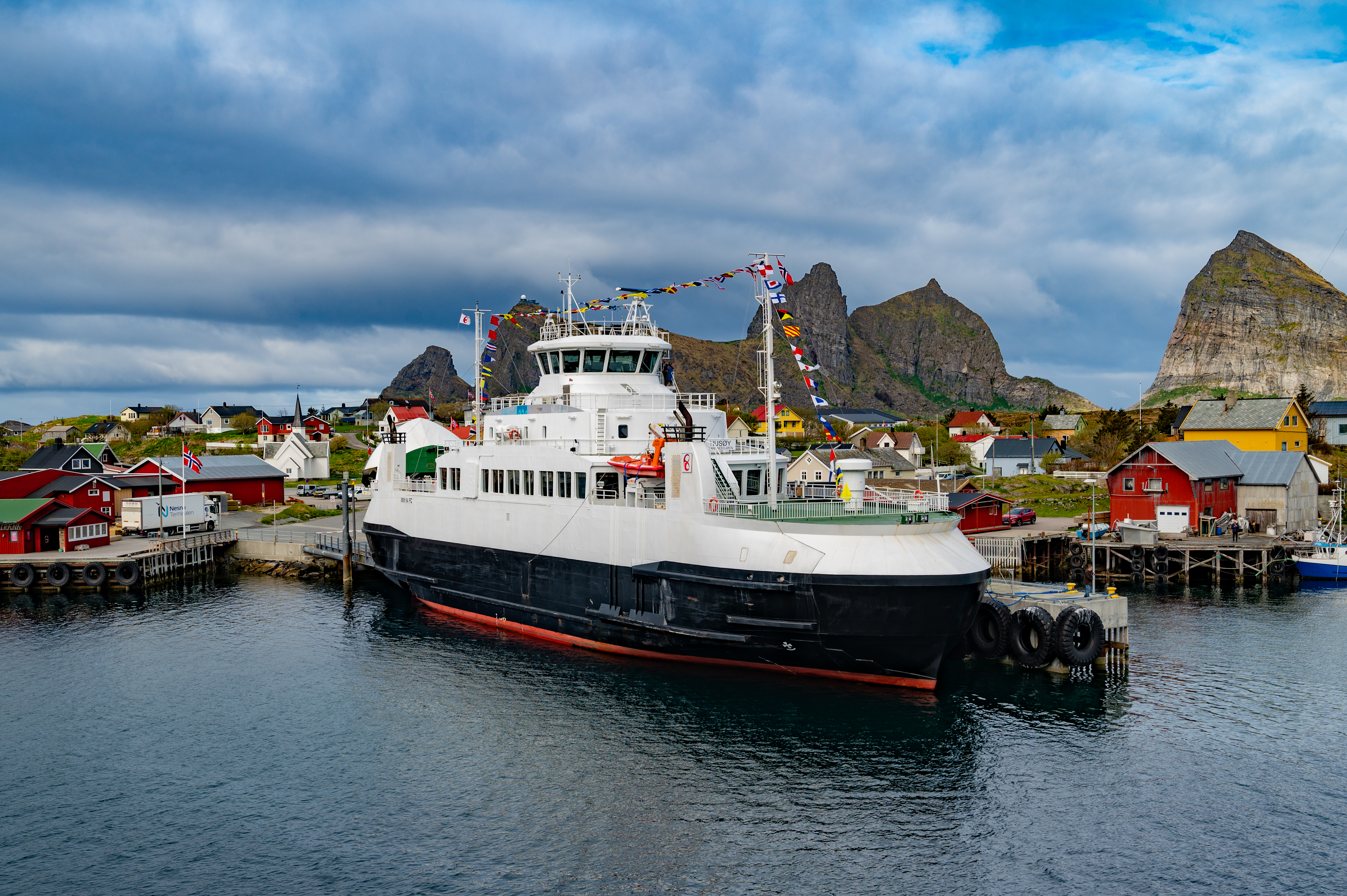

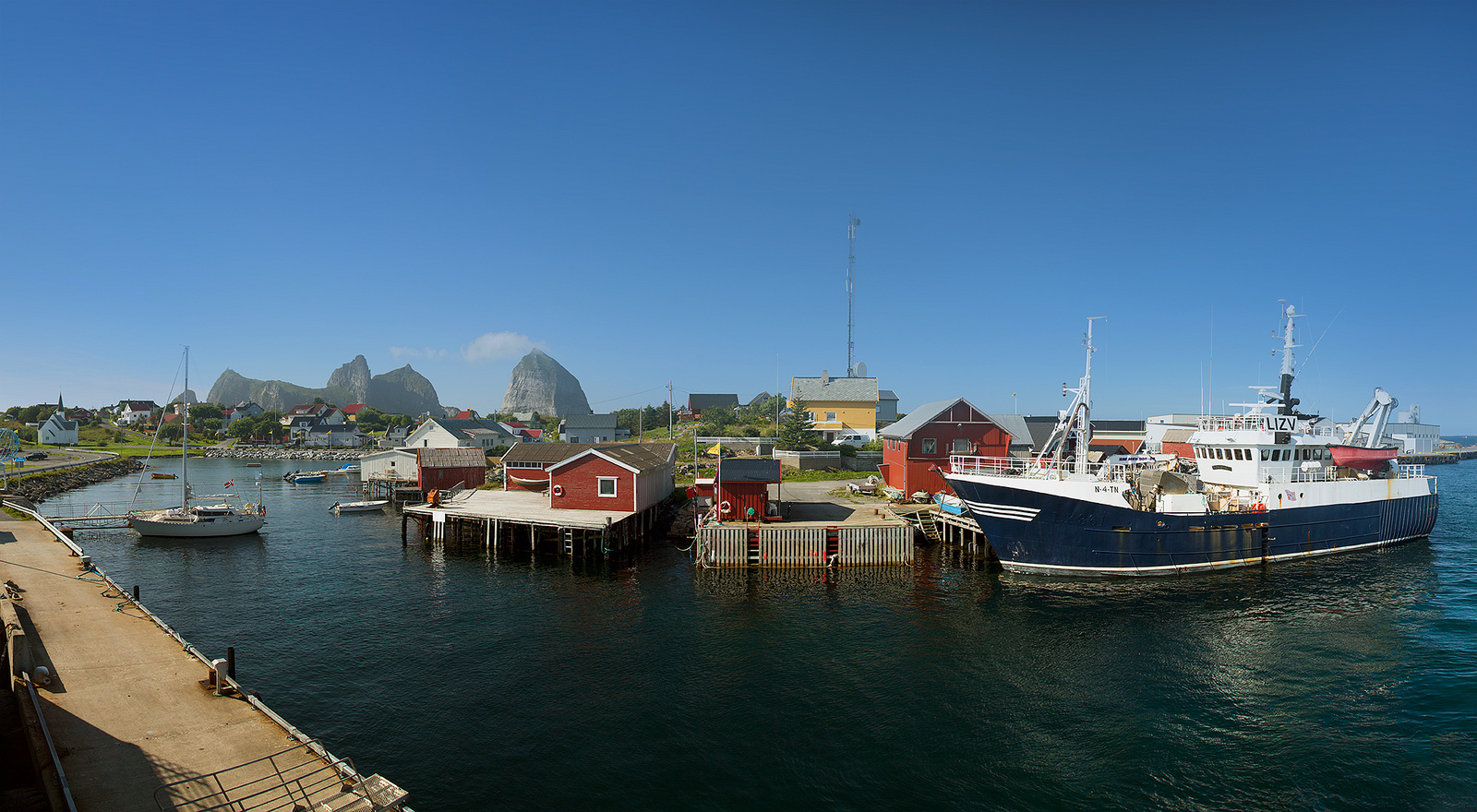

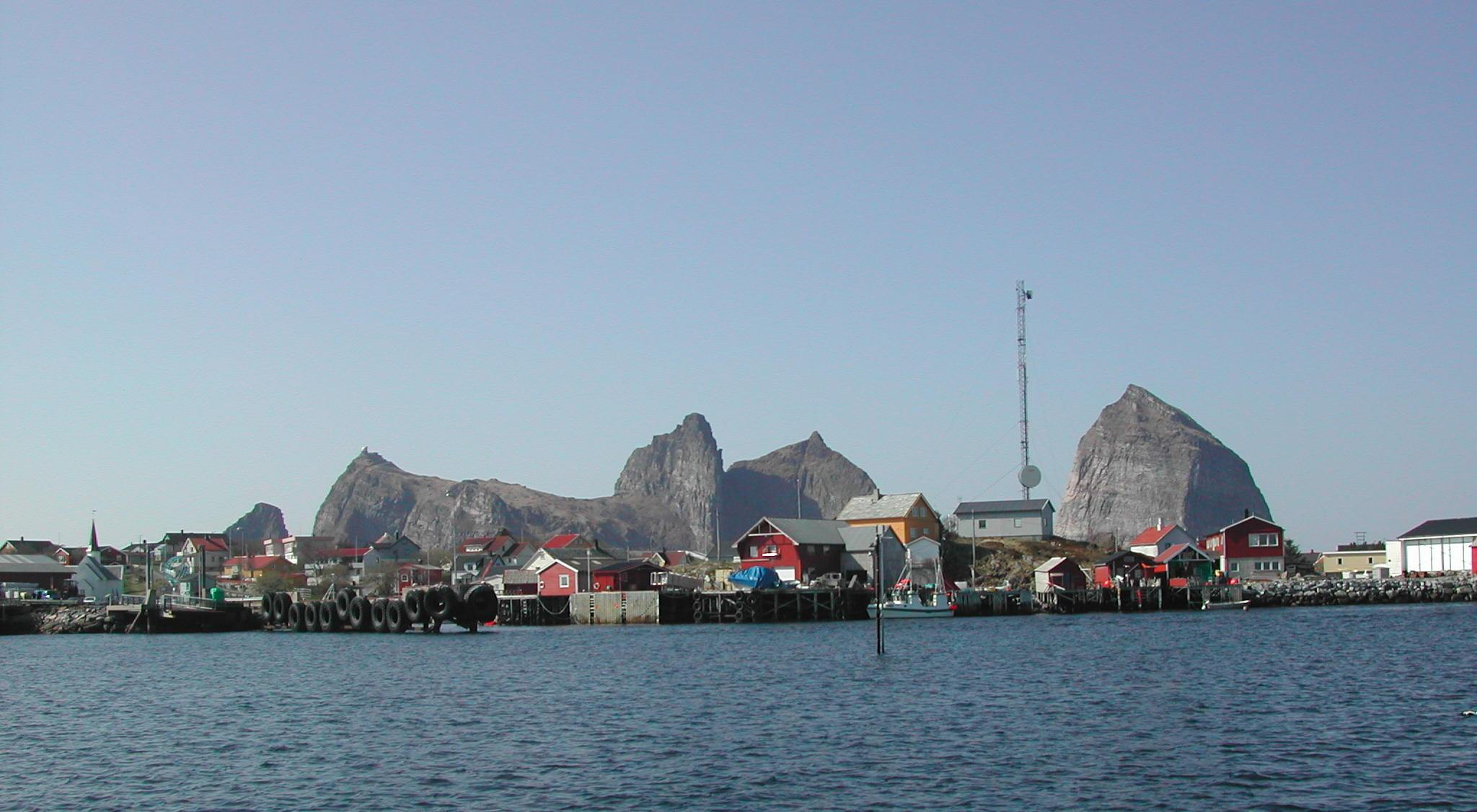

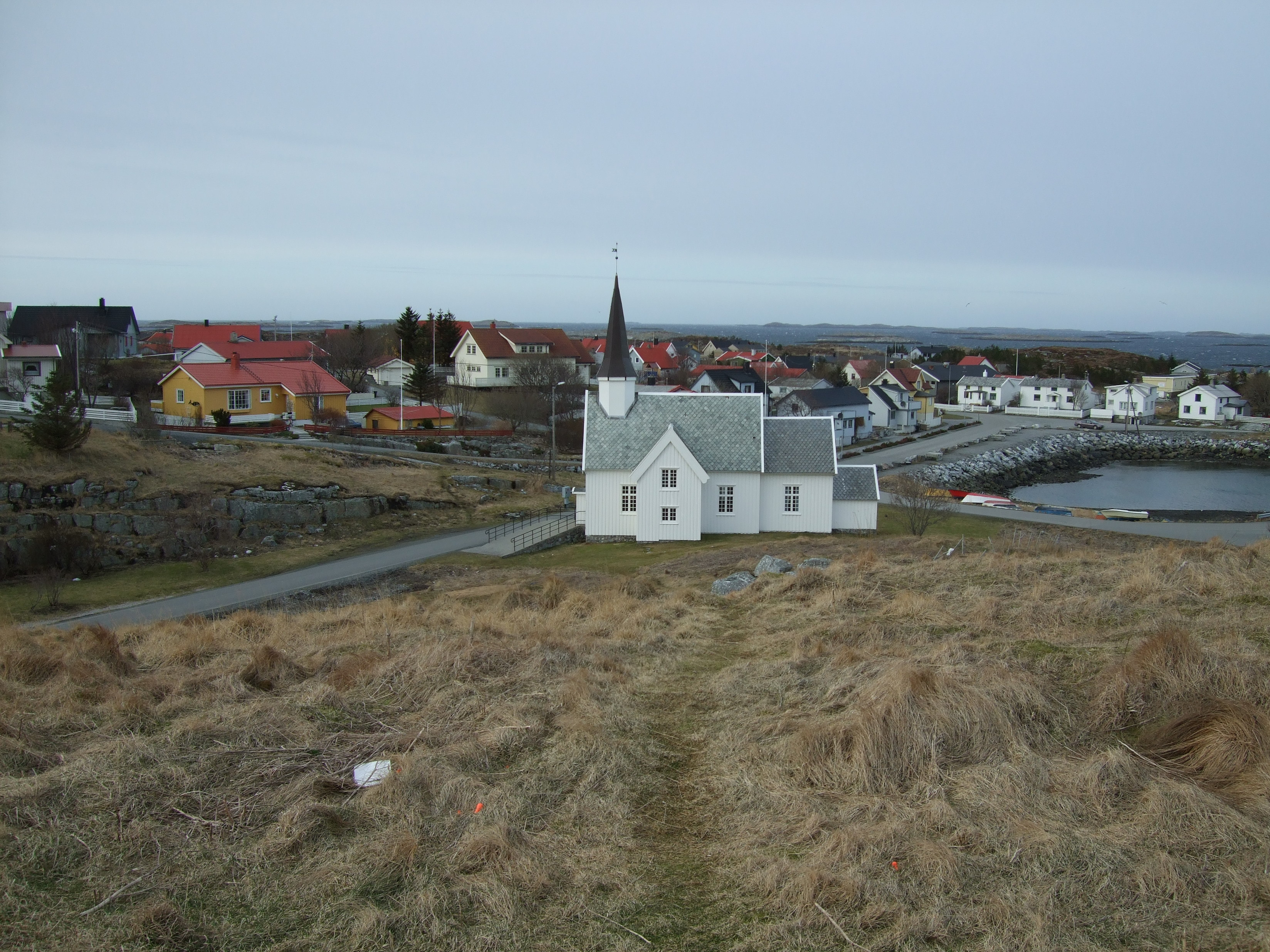
