= Per Hovda =

Norwegian philologist

- Born: October 17, 1908; Hjelmeland, Norway
- Died: April 1, 1997 (aged 88); Oslo, Norway
- Occupation: Philologist

Per Hovda (October 17, 1908 – April 1, 1997) was a Norwegian philologist.

Hovda was born in Hjelmeland Municipality, the son of the teacher Johannes Hovda (1874–?) and Eli née Kleppa (1883–1939). He took his examen artium in 1929 and became a conscripted officer in the military in 1930, attaining the rank of major. During the German attack on Norway in 1940, he participated as an unpaid lieutenant and adjutant in the first battalion of the Rogaland Infantry Regiment No. 8 (IR8).

In the fishing dispute between the United Kingdom and Norway before the International Court of Justice in the Hague in 1949, his report on names of fishing grounds was presented to the court as evidence.

Hovda received the degree candidatus philologiæ in 1938 and his PhD in 1962. He became a lecturer at Kongsgaard School in Stavanger in 1939 and an assistant professor at the Norwegian Place-Names Archives (Norwegian: Norsk stadnamnarkiv) in 1940. He served as the archives manager from 1942 at 1978, and was a lecturer in Nordic place name research at the University of Oslo from 1945 onward, a lecturer in Nordic place name research and Nordic languages at the University of Gothenburg from 1955 to 1956, and the Norwegian state adviser on geographical names (Norwegian: statens navnekonsulent) from 1942 to 1980.

Hovda was a board member of the Norwegian Rural Youth organization in Oslo from 1930 to 1934, a board member of Norsk Tidende from 1952 to 1955, a board member of the Norwegian Society for Language Cultivation (Norwegian: Norsk Måldyrkingslag) from 1949 onward (chairman from 1971 onward), a board member of the Nordic Toponyms Council (Norwegian: Nordisk Stadnamnråd) from 1946 onward, a board member of the Nordic Council for Names Research (Norwegian: Nordisk råd for namnegransking) from 1971 onward, chairman of the Norwegian Asthma and Allergy Association (Norwegian: Norges Astma- og Allergiforbund) from 1963 to 1965, chairman of the Norwegian–Faroese Association (Norwegian: Norsk-færøysk lag) from 1961 to 1964, a member of the Norwegian Academy of Science and Letters from 1968 onward, and a member of the Language Council of Norway from 1971 onward.

Hovda was strongly committed to the situation of the elderly and was, among other things, a central figure in a grassroots campaign known as the "elderly revolt" (Norwegian: eldreopprøret) in 1990.

== Awards ==
Hovda was a recipient of the Defence Medal 1940–1945 with a rosette for his efforts during the Second World War II.

== Bibliography ==
- Hovda, Per. 1951. Les noms des lieux de pêche depuis Træna jusqu'au Varangerfjord (The Names of Fishing Sites from Træna to the Varanger Fjord). Pleadings, Oral Arguments, Documents. Fisheries Case (United Kingdom v. Norway), 3.579–90. The Hague: International Court of Justice.
- 150 articles indexed at Terje Larsen: Norsk stadnamnbibliografi førebels nettversjon (Norwegian Place Name Bibliography, provisional online version), December 1998.
