= Sanna, Nordland =

Island and village area in Træna, Norway

Sanna
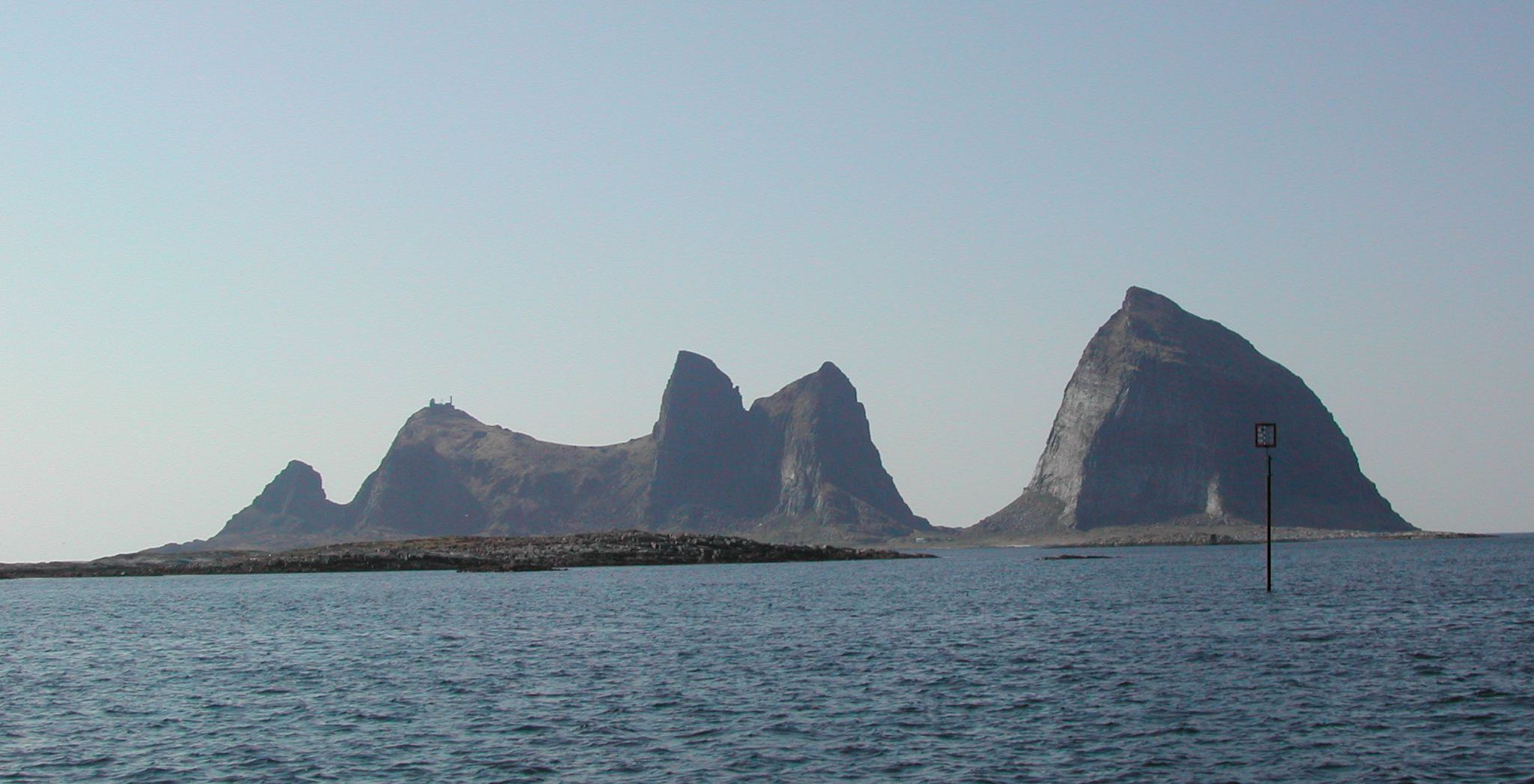
- Interactive map of Sanna

Geography
- Location: Nordland, Norway
- Coordinates: 66.5057°N 12.0469°E
- Area: 3 km^{2} (1.2 sq mi)
- Highest elevation: 338 m (1109 ft)
- Highest point: Trænstaven

Administration
- Norway
- County: Nordland
- Municipality: Træna Municipality

Demographics
- Population: 3 (2018)

Sanna is an island and village area in Træna Municipality in Nordland county, Norway. The 3-square-kilometre (1.2 sq mi) island is the largest island in Træna Municipality. The island is located less than 1 kilometre (0.62 mi) west of the main island of Husøya. The island has five characteristic mountaintops, the highest is the 338-metre (1,109 ft) tall Trænstaven. The Traena Music Festival is held on this island each year. The island has 3 permanent residents (in 2018).

== Media gallery ==
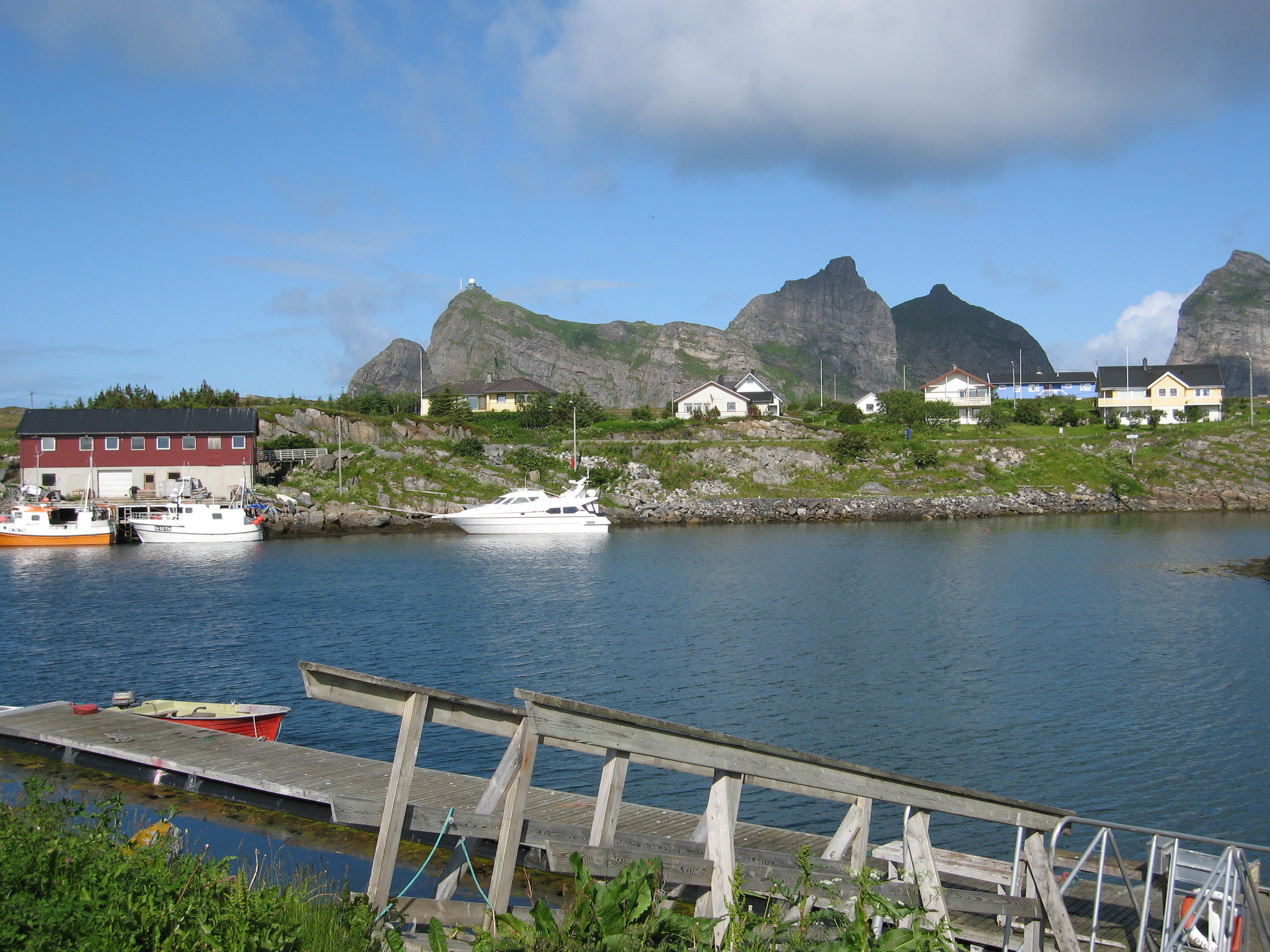

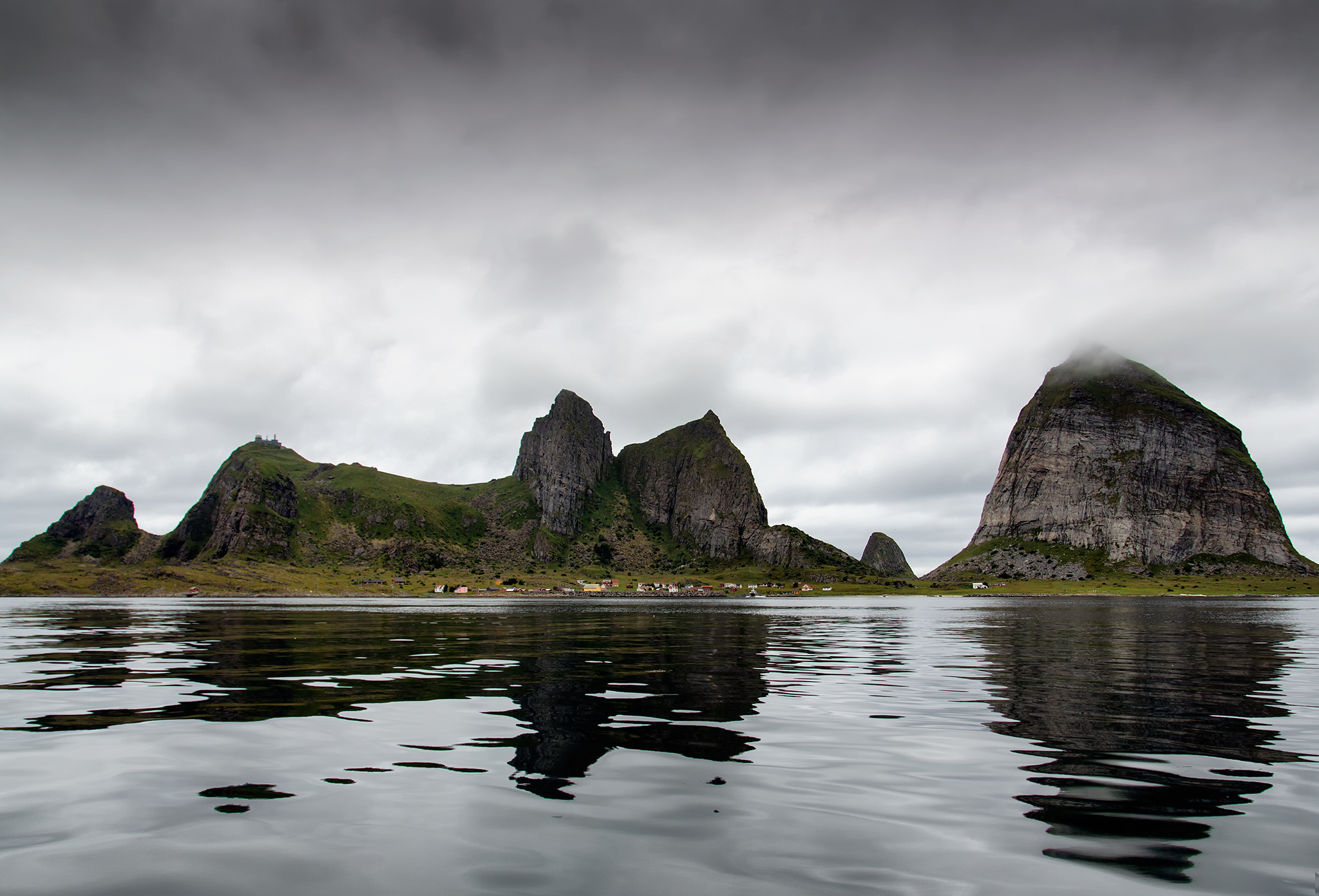

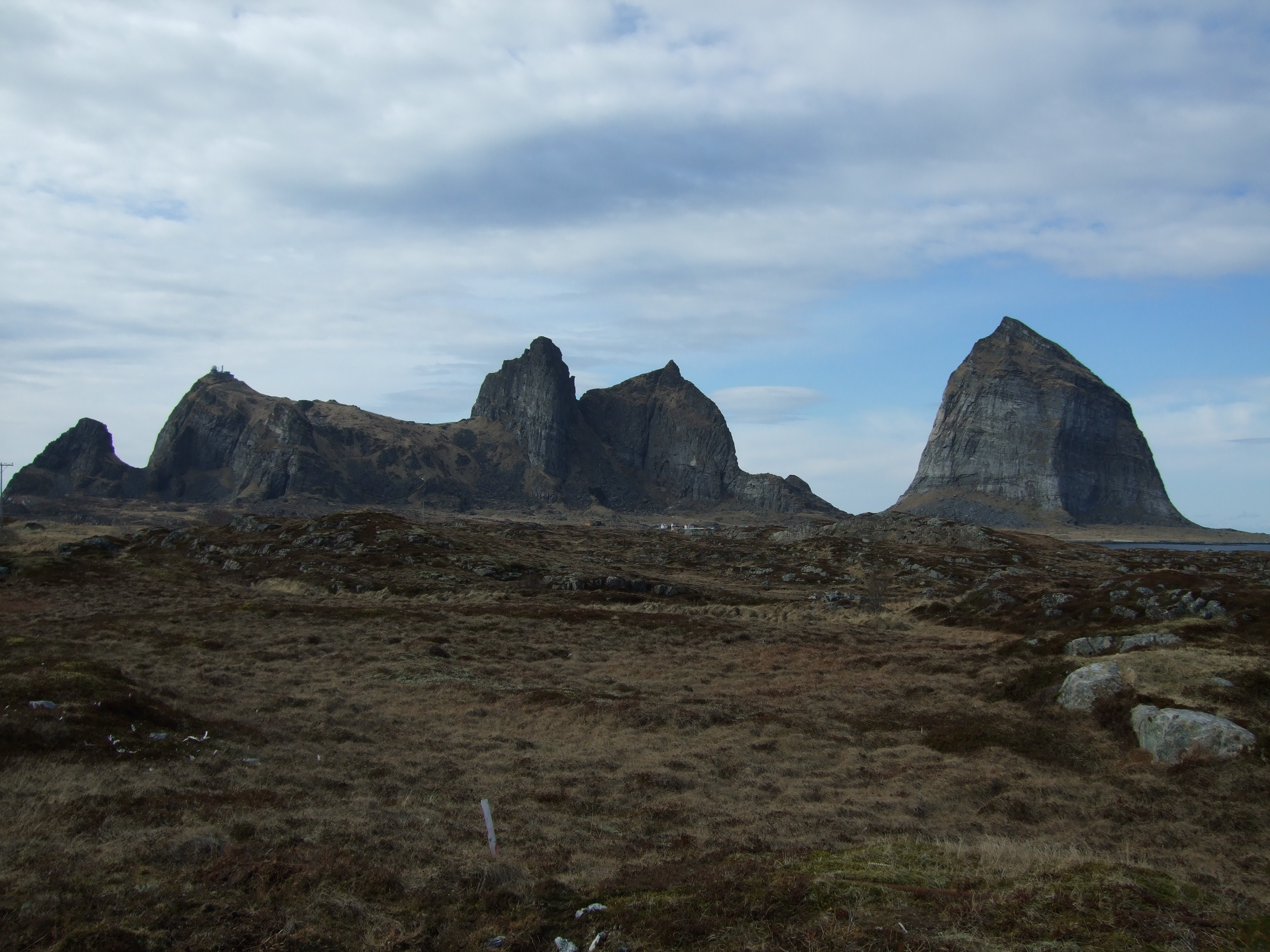

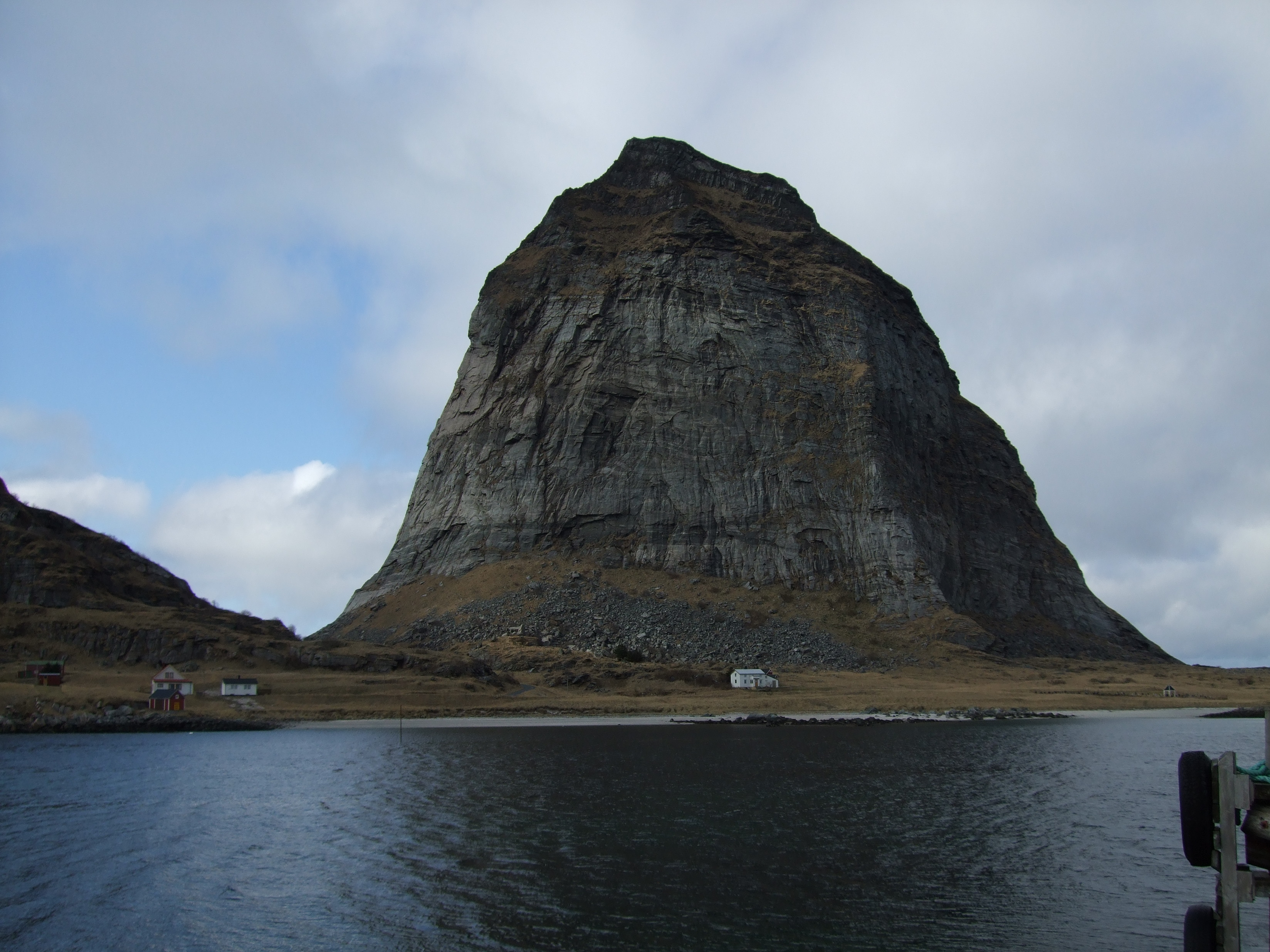

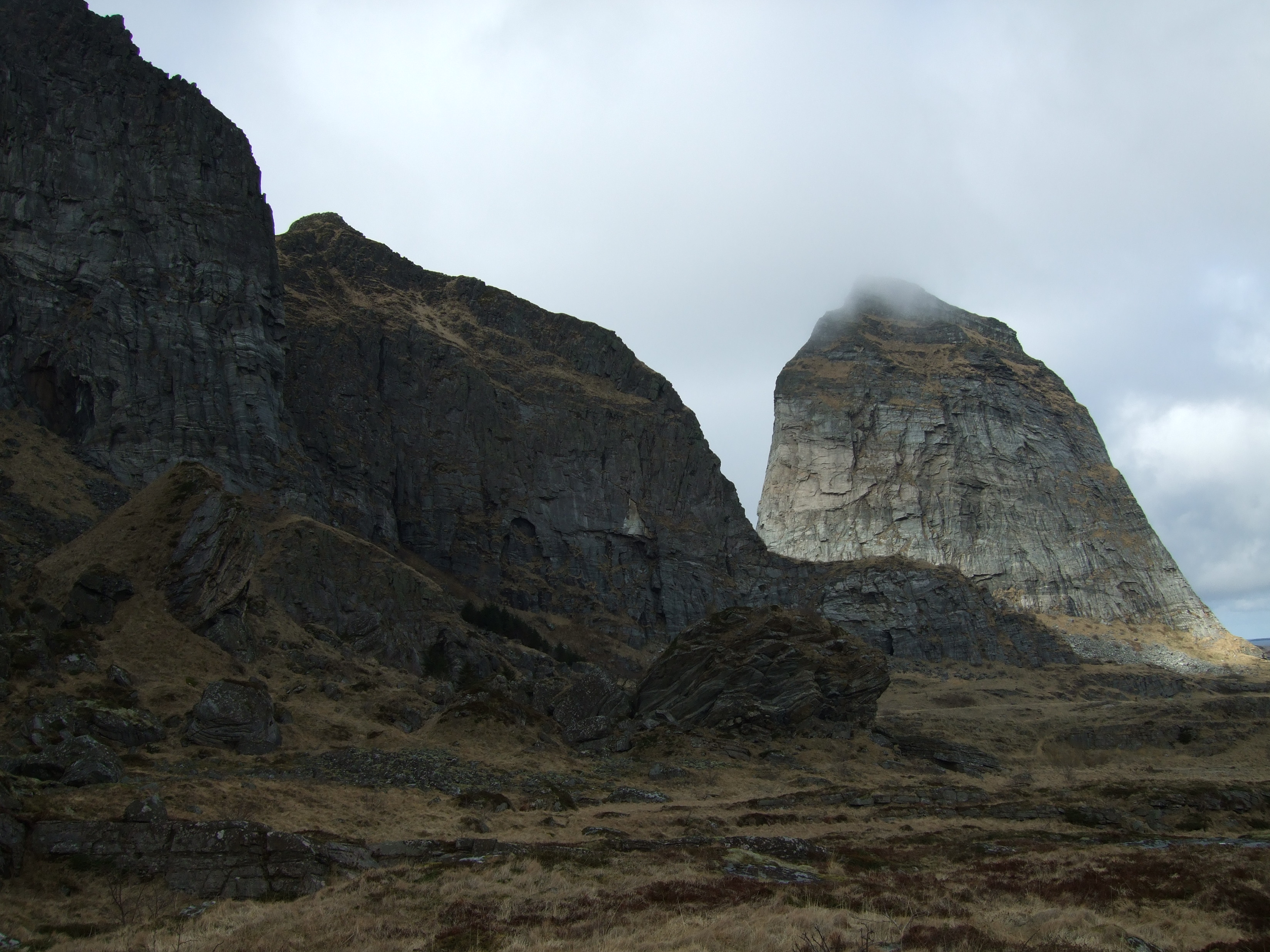

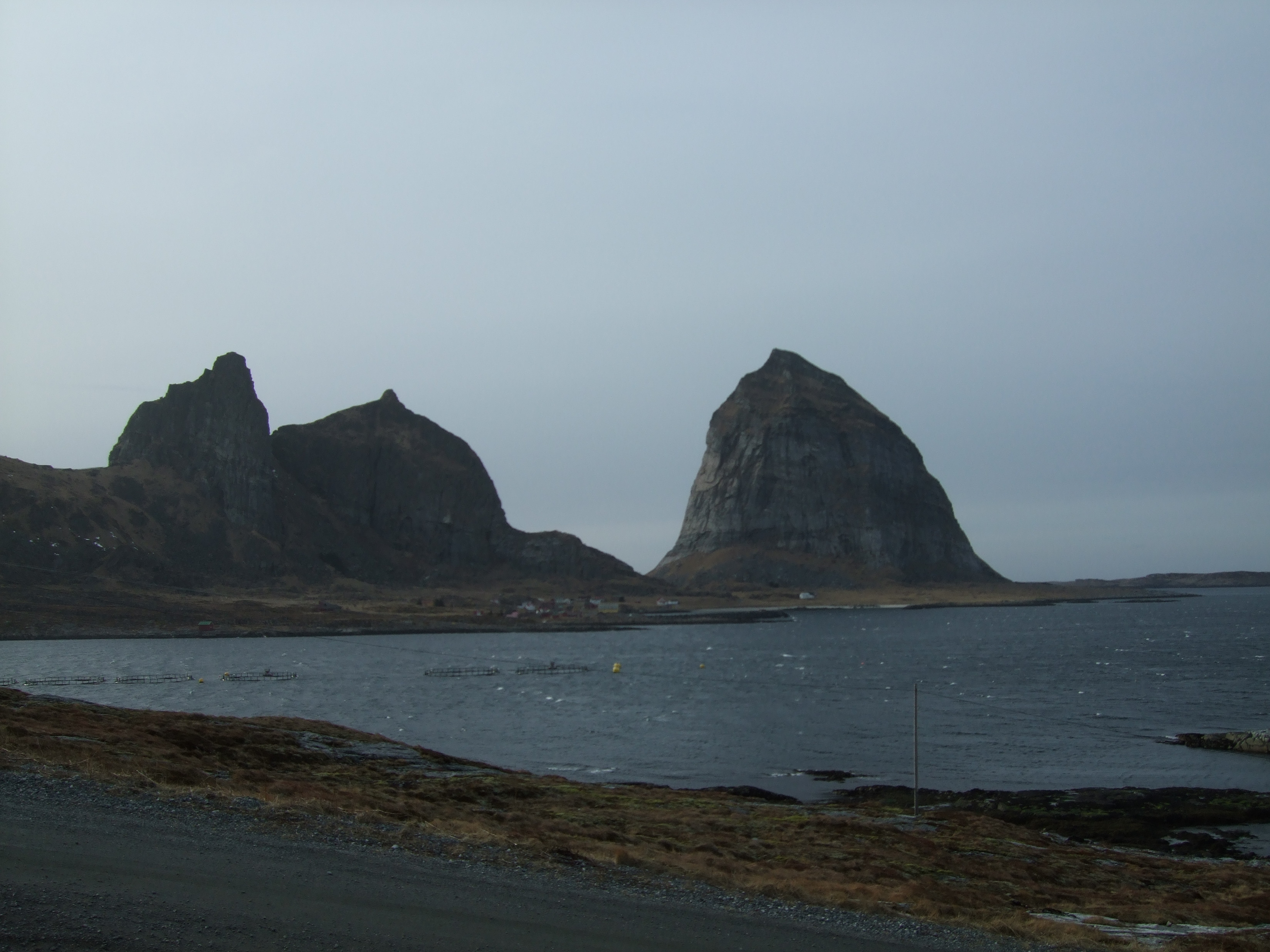

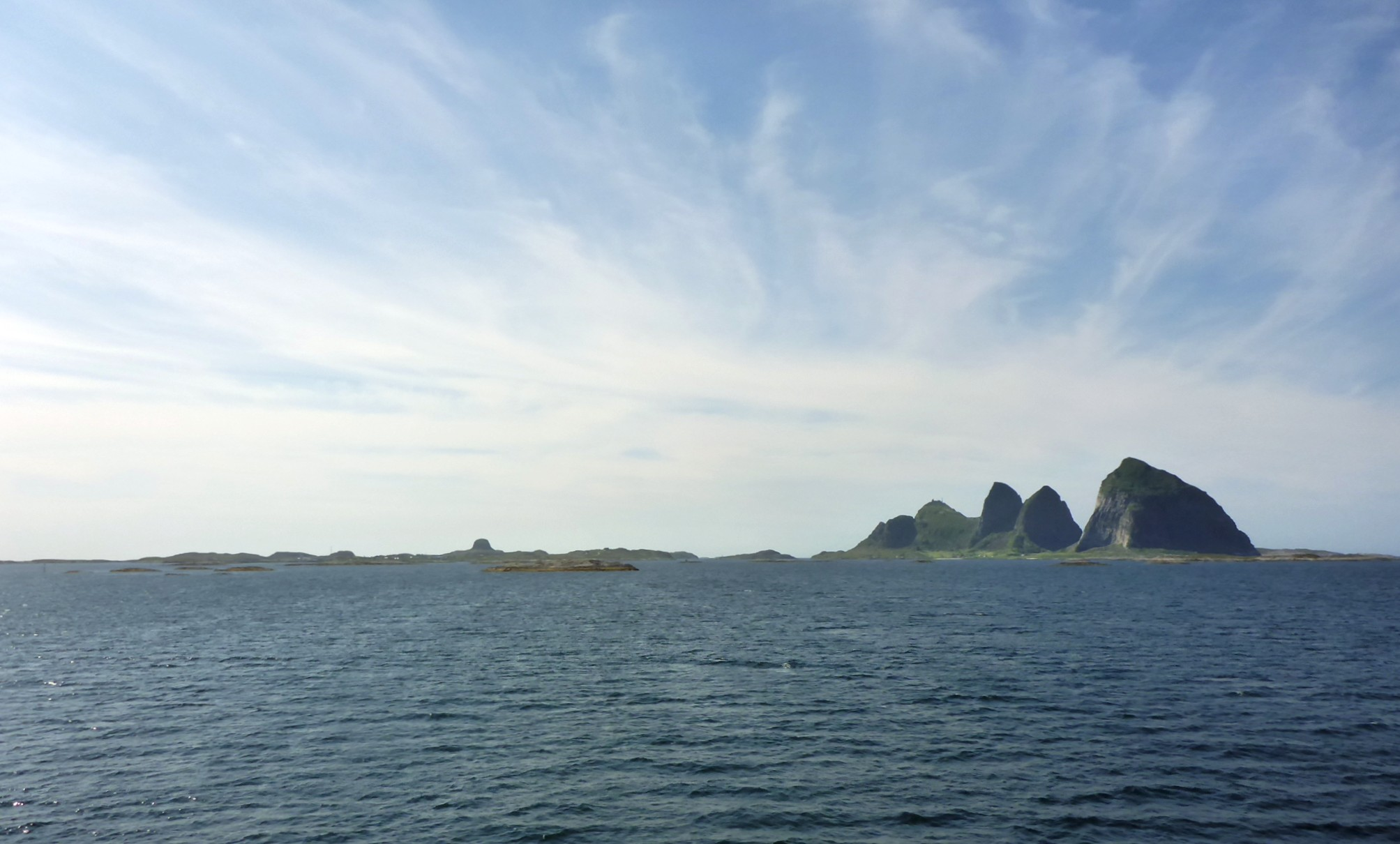

== See also ==
- List of islands of Norway
