= Norwegian Asthma and Allergy Association =

Norwegian health organization

The Norwegian Asthma and Allergy Association (Norwegian: Norges Astma- og Allergiforbund, NAAF) is a Norwegian health organization.

The association was established on January 24, 1960. It works on behalf of people with asthma, chronic obstructive pulmonary disease, allergies, and eczema. The association has about 14,000 members with local chapters in every county, 18 employees employed centrally, and 13 regional employees.

The association publishes daily pollen forecasts during allergy season.
