= Træna Church =

Church in Nordland, Norway

- Træna kirke
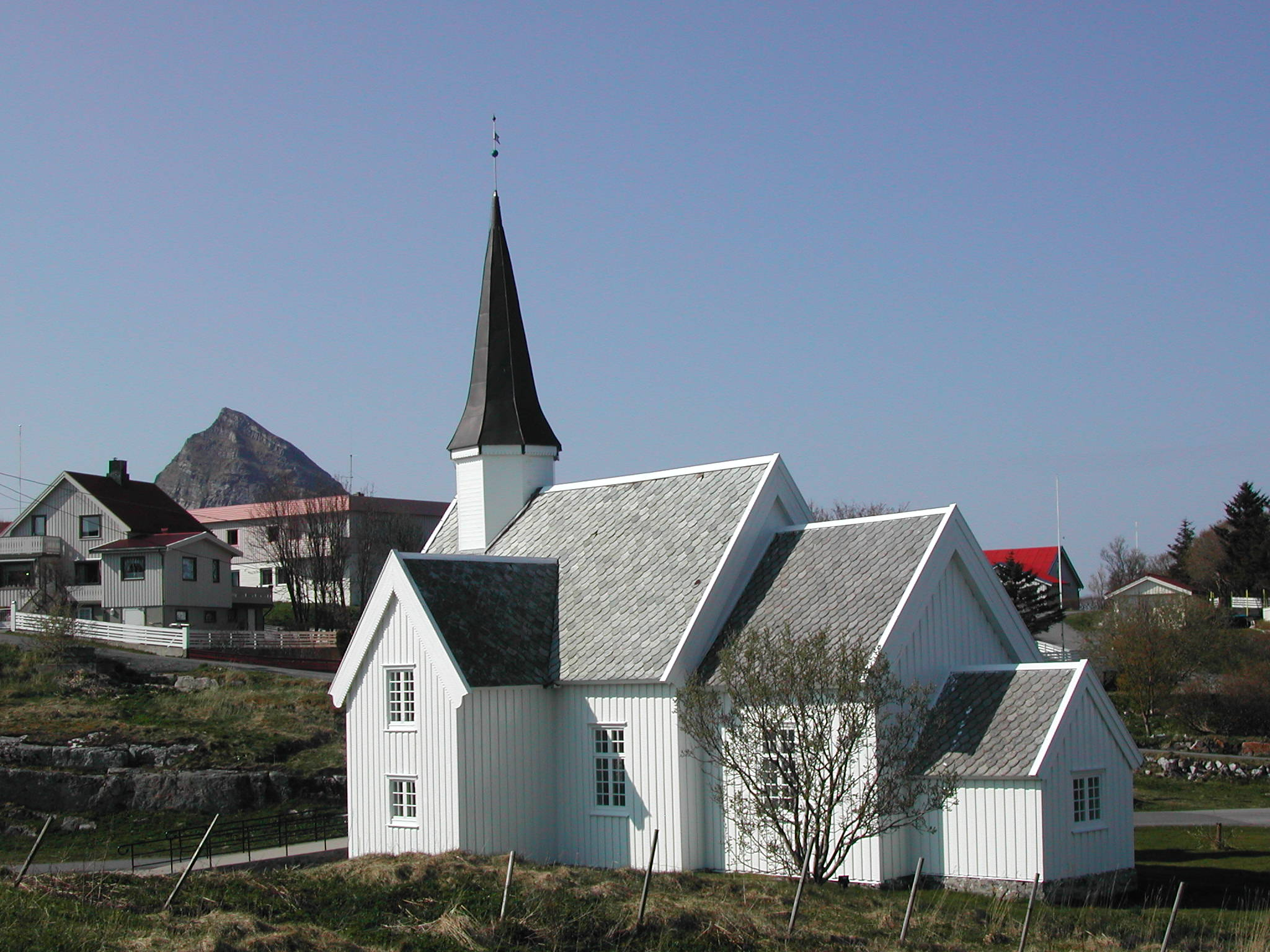
- View of the church
- Træna Church
- 66.50125464°N 12.09836715°E
- Location: Træna Municipality, Nordland
- Country: Norway
- Denomination: Church of Norway
- Churchmanship: Evangelical Lutheran

History
- Status: Parish church
- Founded: 14th century
- Consecrated: 1773

Architecture
- Functional status: Active
- Architect: Jørgen Coldevin
- Architectural type: Cruciform
- Completed: 1773 (253 years ago)

Specifications
- Capacity: 200
- Materials: Wood

Administration
- Diocese: Sør-Hålogaland
- Deanery: Nord-Helgeland prosti
- Parish: Træna
- Norwegian Cultural Heritage Site
- Type: Church
- Status: Automatically protected
- ID: 85676

Træna Church (Norwegian: Træna kirke) is a parish church of the Church of Norway in Træna Municipality in Nordland county, Norway. It is located in the village of Husøya on the island of Husøya. It is the main church for the Træna parish which is part of the Nord-Helgeland prosti (deanery) in the Diocese of Sør-Hålogaland. The white, wooden church was built in a cruciform style in 1773 using plans drawn up by the architect Jørgen Coldevin. The church seats about 200 people.

== History ==
The earliest existing historical records of the church date back to the year 1589, but the church was not new that year. The first church in Træna was not located on the present church site. It was either located in the centre of the island by the present-day cemetery, about 650 metres (2,130 ft) west of the present site, or it was located at an alternate site about 400 metres (1,300 ft) to the southwest of the present site of the church. Regardless, the church was old and by the mid-1600s, the church was in poor condition, so it was torn down. A new church was constructed on the present church site in the central part of the village of Husøya. It was a cruciform log building with a small tower on the west end. There were about 10 rows of benches in the church. An inspection from 1771 noted that the church was over 100 years old and in quite poor condition. In 1773, the old church was torn down and a new church was built on the same site. The new building was a timber-framed building with a cruciform ground plan, a small tower on the west end of the roof, and a sacristy on the east end.

== Media gallery ==
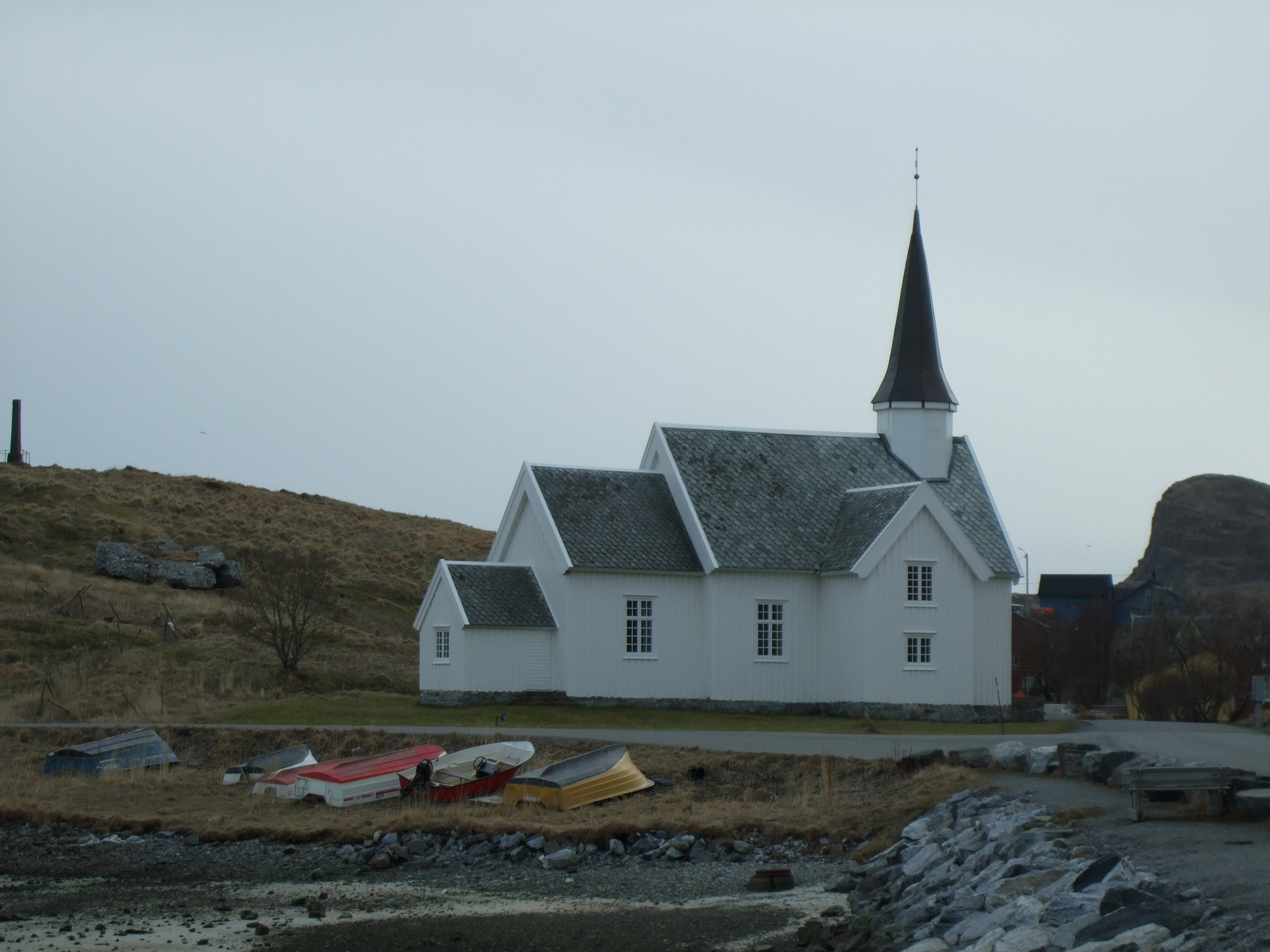

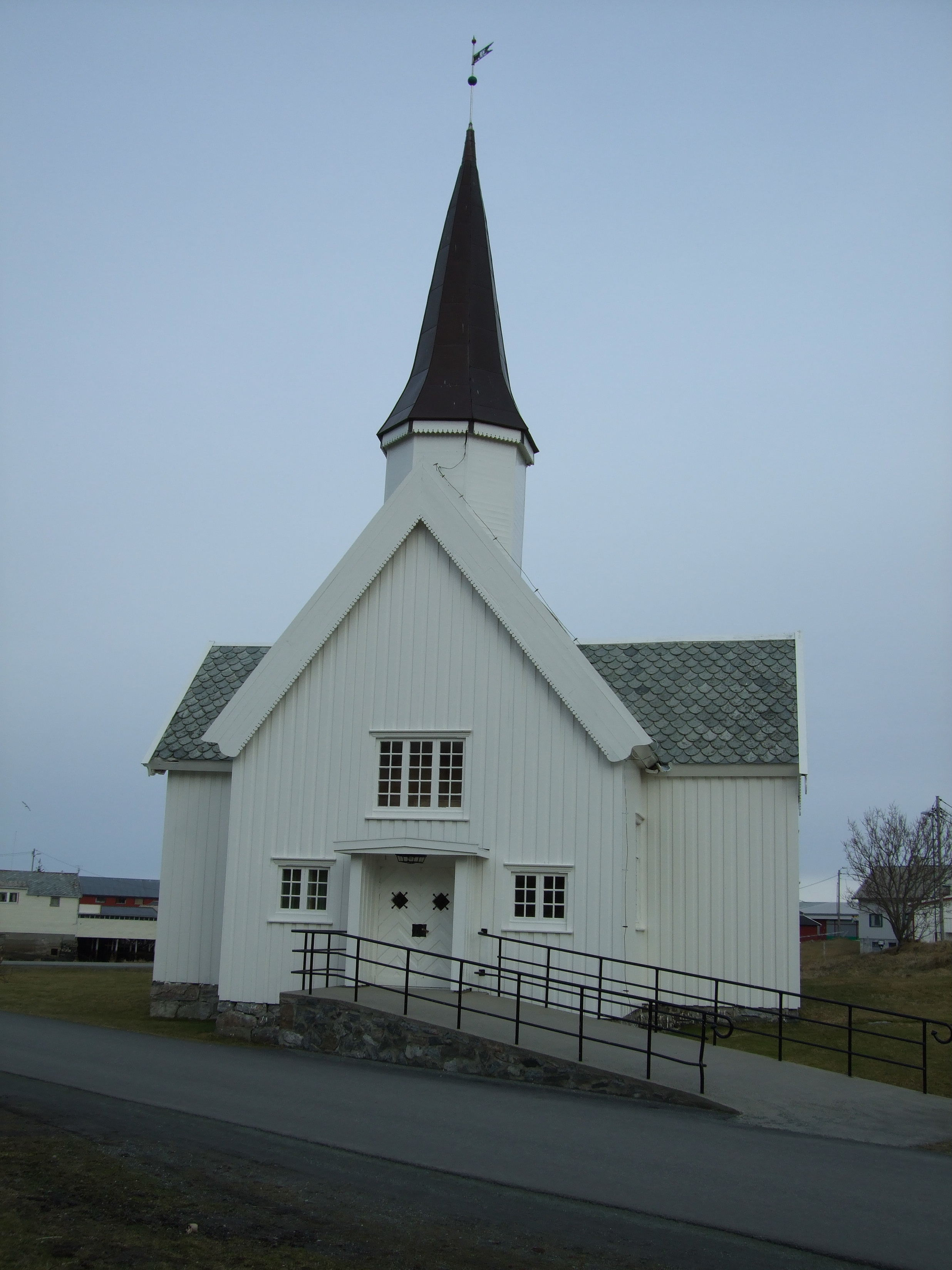

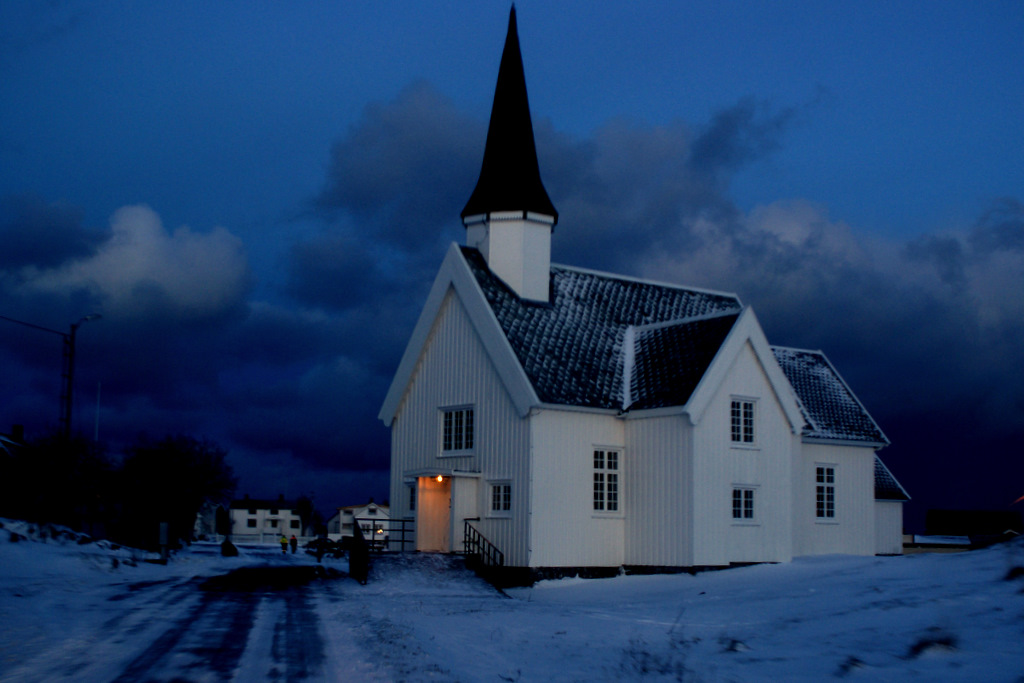

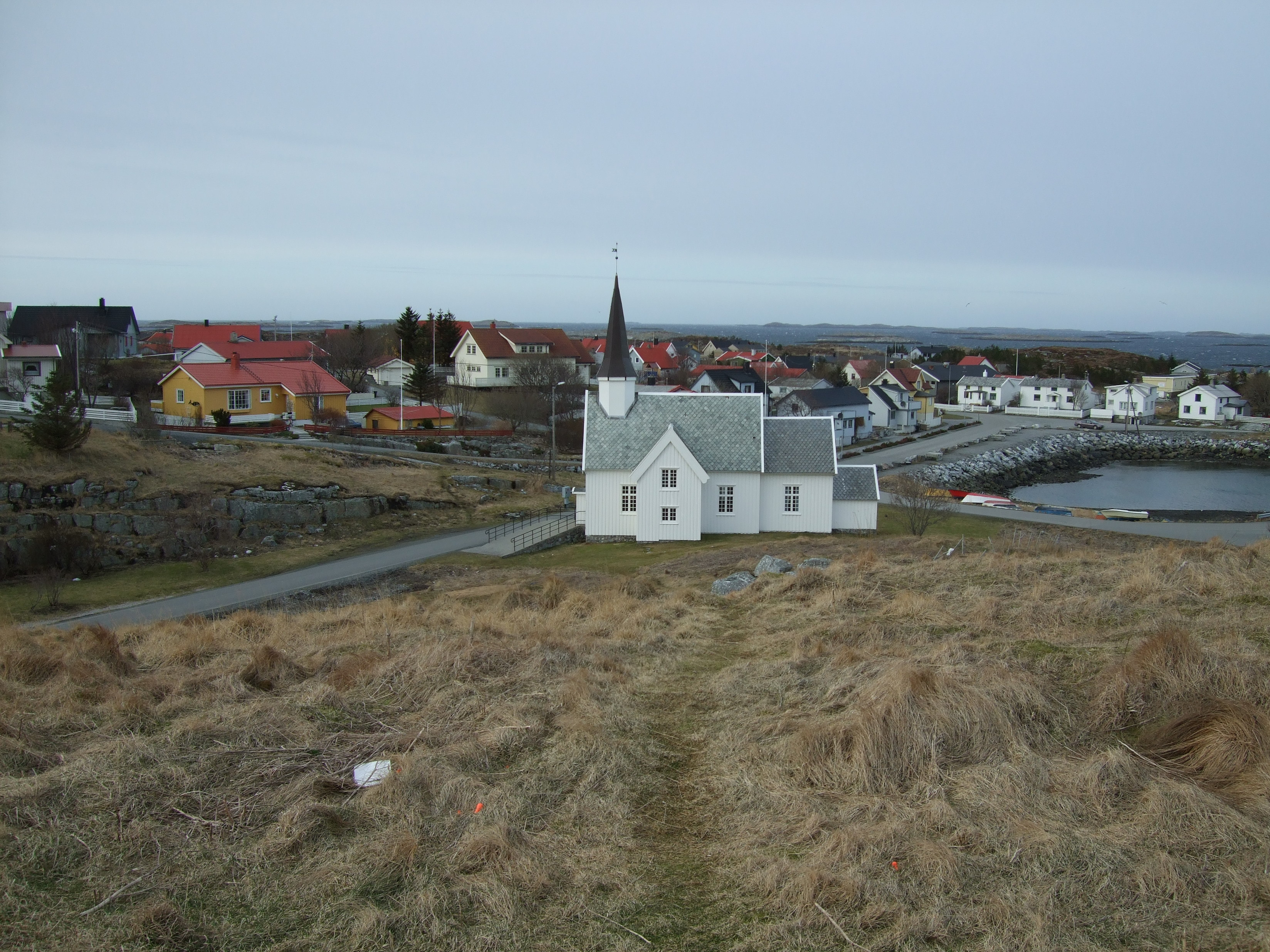

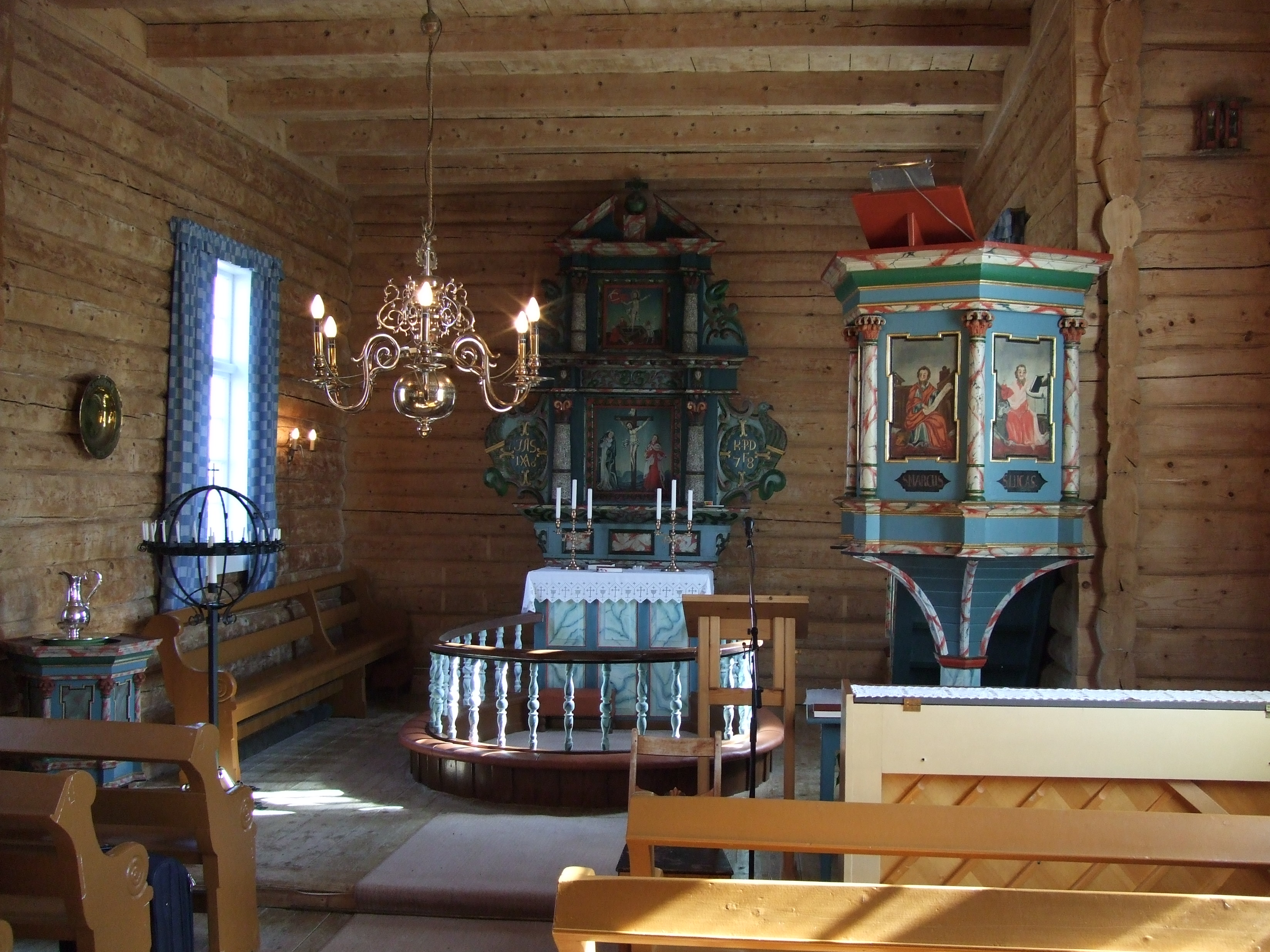

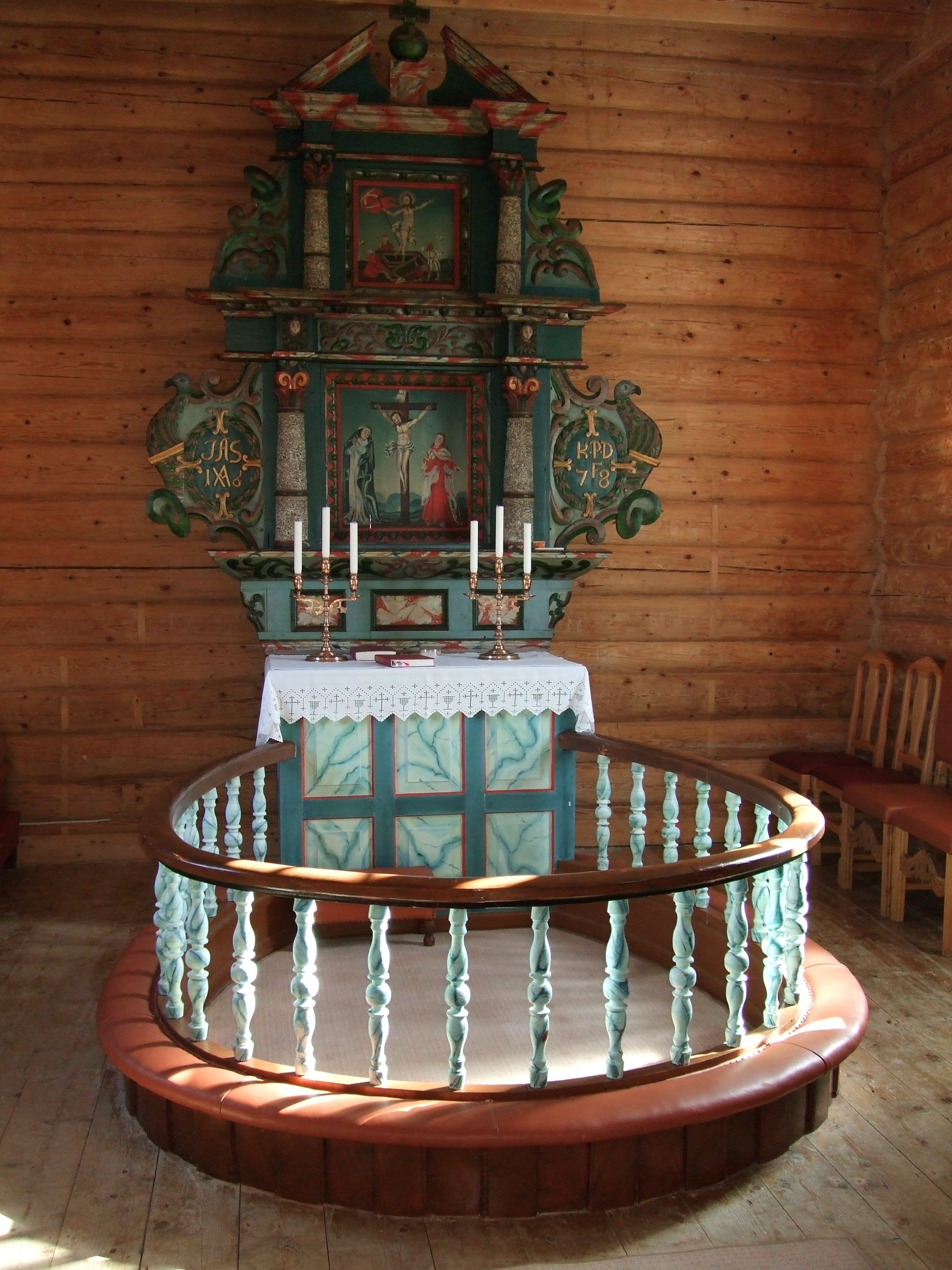

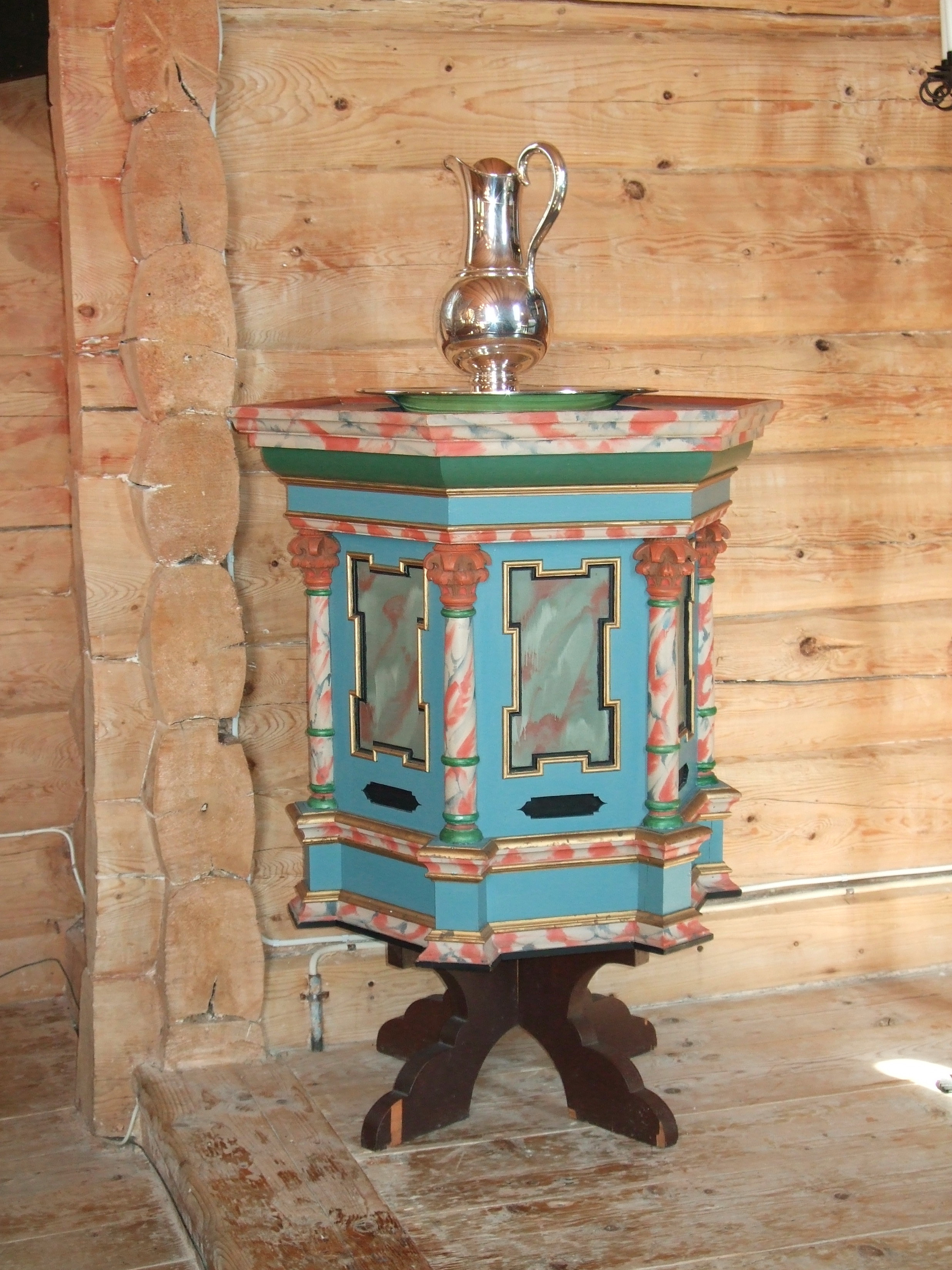

== See also ==
- List of churches in Sør-Hålogaland
