= Træna Lighthouse =

Lighthouse in Norway

Træna Lighthouse Træna fyrstasjon
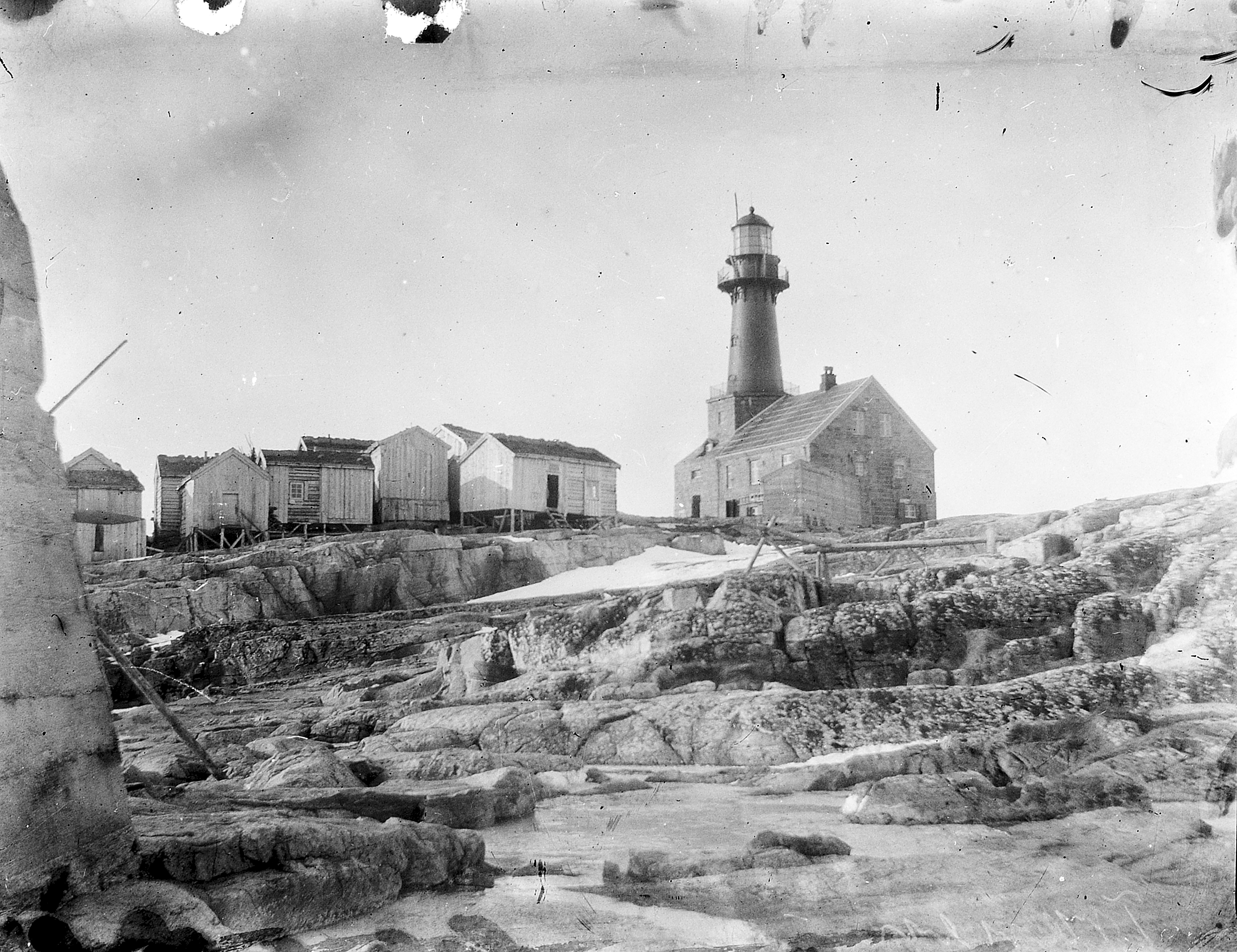
- View of the lighthouse
- Location of the lighthouse
- Location: Nordland, Norway
- Coordinates: 66°26′N 11°58′E

Tower
- Constructed: 1877
- Foundation: granite
- Construction: cast iron
- Automated: 1974
- Height: 21.1 metres (69 ft)
- Shape: cylindrical tower
- Markings: red tower

Light
- Focal height: 36.8 metres (121 ft)
- Intensity: 88,000 candela
- Range: 12.2 nmi (22.6 km; 14.0 mi)
- Characteristic: Fl W 15s
- Norway no.: 660000

Træna Lighthouse (Norwegian: Træna fyr) is a coastal lighthouse in Træna Municipality in Nordland county, Norway. It is located on the island of Sørholmen in the Trænfjorden, about 10 kilometres (6.2 mi) southwest of the main island of Husøya and about 17 kilometres (11 mi) west of the island village of Lovund in Lurøy Municipality.

The lighthouse was built in 1877 and automated in 1974. It has a granite foundation with an 18-metre (59 ft) tall red cast iron tower. The light sits at an elevation of 36.8 metres (121 ft) above sea level. The 88,000-candela light can be seen for about 12.2 nmi (22.6 km; 14.0 mi). The light emits one white flash every 15 seconds.

== See also ==
- Lighthouses in Norway
- List of lighthouses in Norway
