= Traena Music Festival =

Annual music festival in Norway

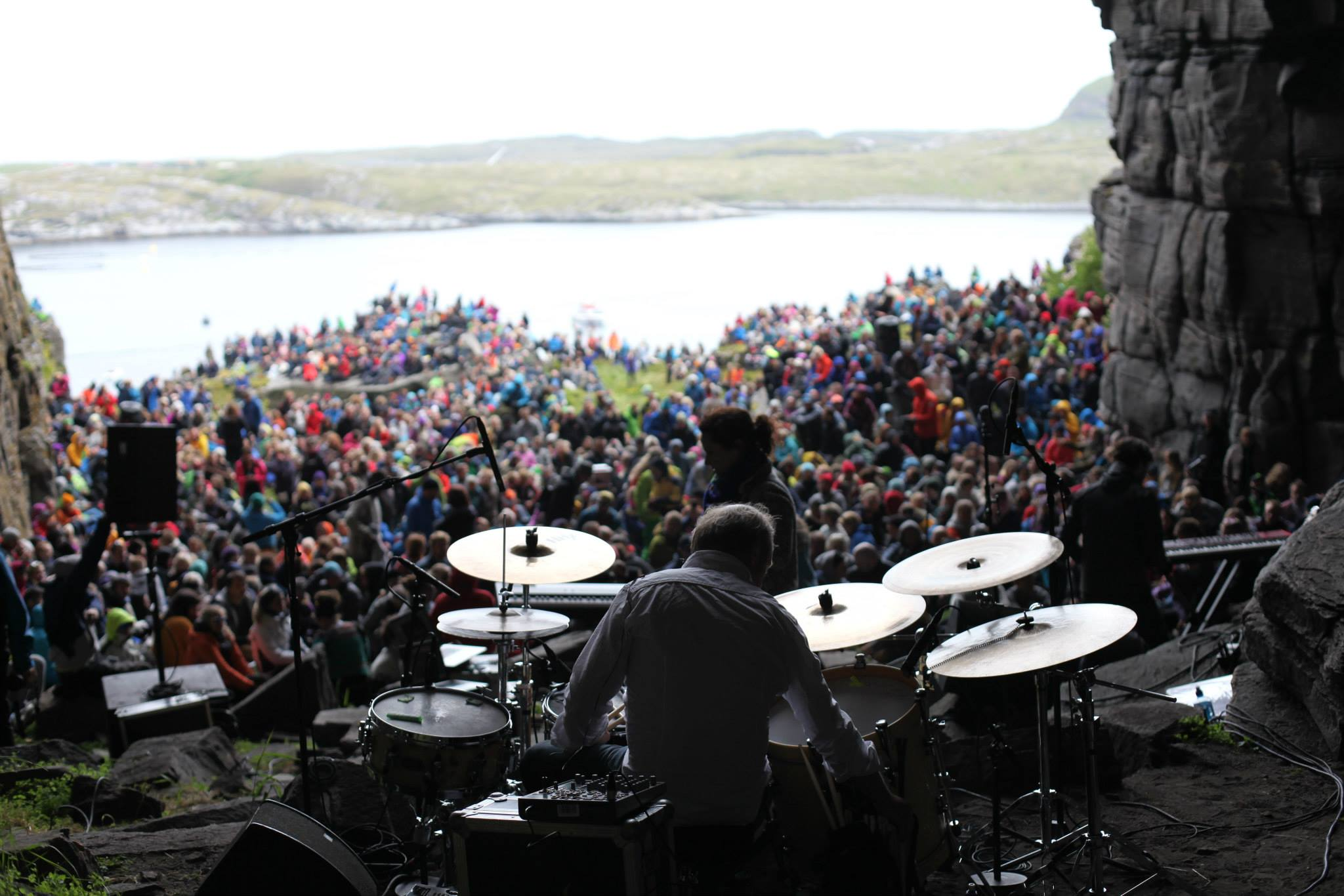
Norwegian artist Anneli Drecker playing inside the natural cave Kirkhelleren on Træna, in the cave traces of human activity dating 9000 years ago has been found

The Traena Music Festival (Norwegian: Trænafestivalen) is held annually in Træna Municipality in Nordland county, Norway. The festival is held on the islands of Husøya and Sanna. The islands are only accessible by ferry boat from the mainland in neighboring Lurøy Municipality.

Venues have included an ancient cave, a church with blacked-out windows (to block out the Midnight sun which shines for 23 hours a day), and tents. The festival attracts many people from neighbouring communities who visit the camp to enjoy the music and unique nature of the festival.

== History ==
Nine thousand years ago, some pioneers migrated to these islands out in the Norwegian Sea. There was not much land that could be farmed nor many trees that could be felled, but the richness of the surrounding ocean made it possible for people to settle. Even today, this is one of the richest fishing grounds in Norway.

Over the centuries that followed, the ocean richness has supported the small population of 400 people; these residents became important trading partners in the international fish market. Most of what comes out of the ocean is exported. This also means that this isolated island always has been a highly international place. This international music festival celebrates the history and culture of Træna Municipality by bringing new Norwegian "fresh" musical expression into the open in different genres.
