= Selvær =

Island in Nordland, Norway

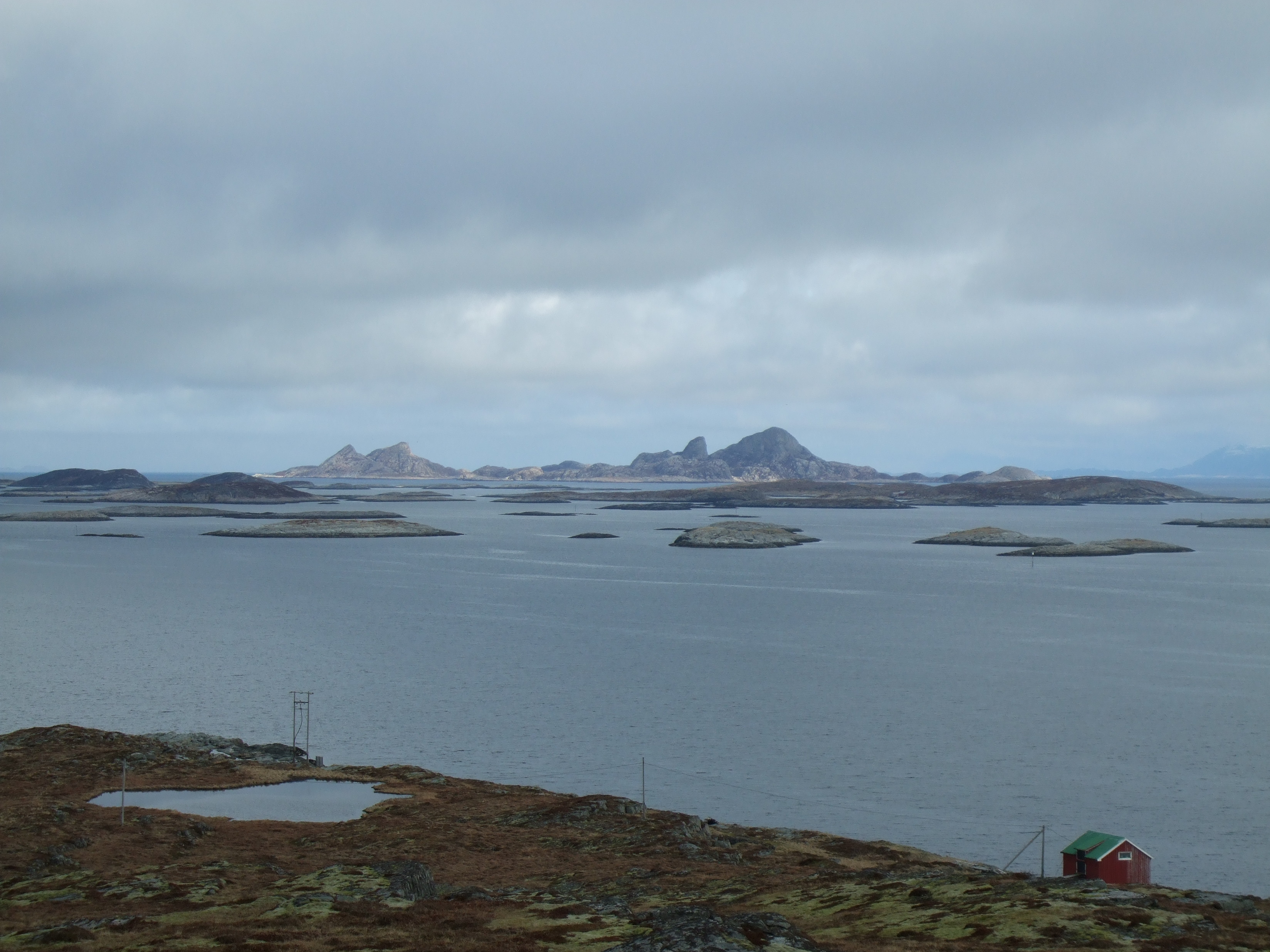
- View of the Selvær islands seen from Træna
- Interactive map of Selvær

Geography
- Location: Nordland, Norway
- Coordinates: 66.5877°N 12.2411°E

Administration
- Norway
- County: Nordland
- Municipality: Træna Municipality

Demographics
- Population: 55 (2018)

Selvær is an island group and fishing village in Træna Municipality in Nordland county, Norway.

== Description ==
Selvær is located about 10 kilometres (6.2 mi) north-east of the main island of Husøya and about 16 kilometres (9.9 mi) west of the island of Nesøya. There are a number of small islands in the island group, and several of them are linked together by small bridges and causeways. The 70 or so residents on the island make their living by fishing or fishing-related fields. Historically, there was also some farming done on the island. The only access to Selvær is by a public ferry from Husøya or by personal boats. There are about 55 residents on the island.

== Important Bird Area ==
The islands have been designated an Important Bird Area (IBA) by BirdLife International because it supports a significant population of barnacle geese on passage migration.

== See also ==
- List of islands of Norway
