= Træna Municipality =

Municipality in Nordland, Norway

Træna Municipality Træna kommune
- Municipality
- Trænen herred (historic name)
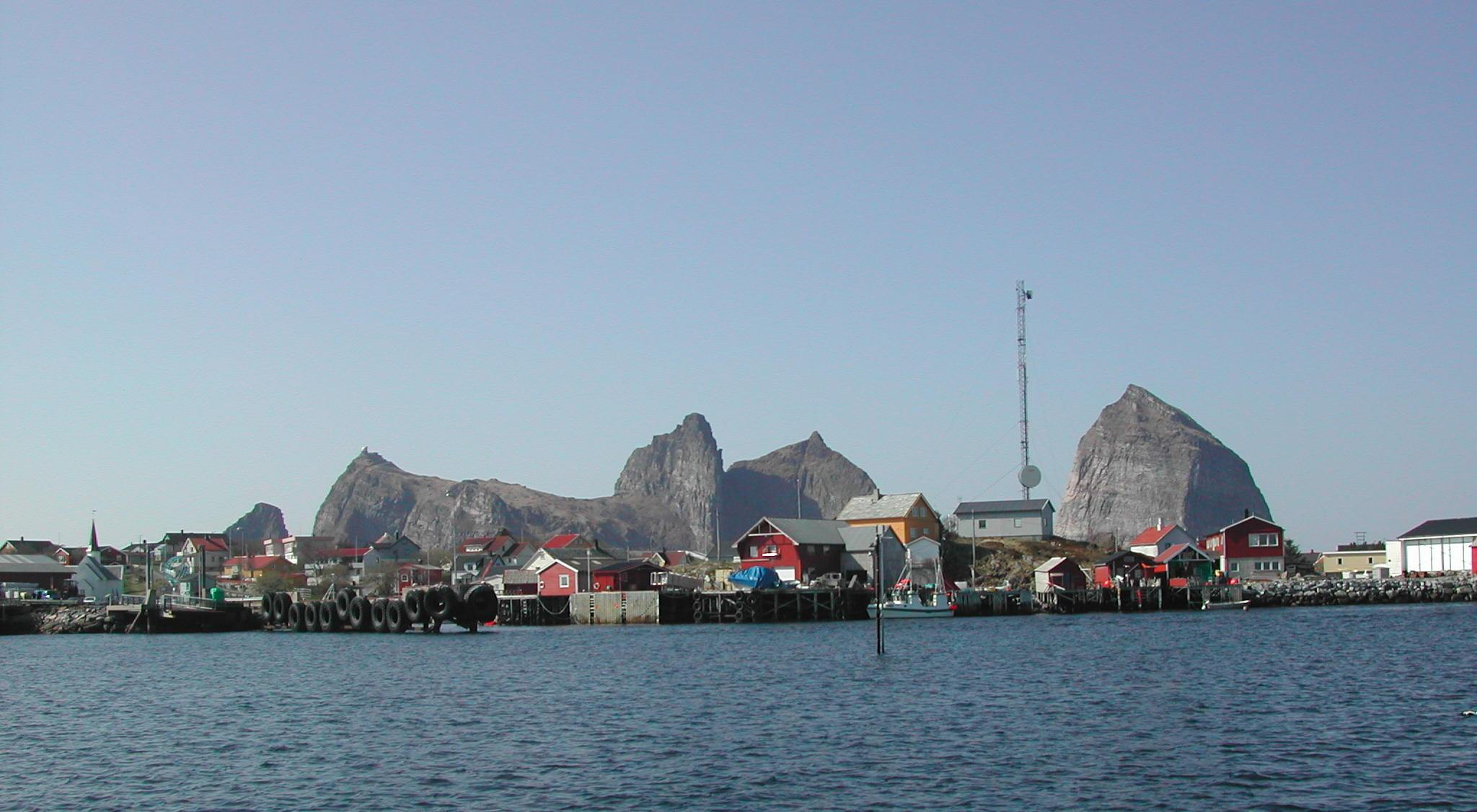
- View of the Husøya harbour

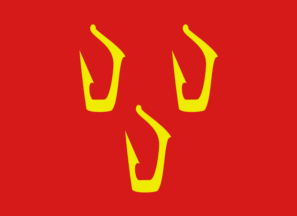
- Flag Coat of arms

- Nordland within Norway

- Træna within Nordland
- Coordinates: 66°30′27″N 12°01′51″E
- Country: Norway
- County: Nordland
- District: Helgeland
- Established: 1 Jan 1872
  - Preceded by: Lurøy Municipality
- Administrative centre: Husøya

Government
  - Mayor (2023): Trond Vegard Sletten (Ap)

Area
  - Total: 16.54 km^{2} (6.39 sq mi)
  - Land: 16.49 km^{2} (6.37 sq mi)
  - Water: 0.05 km^{2} (0.019 sq mi) 0.3%
  - Rank: #353 in Norway
- Highest elevation: 336.74 m (1,104.8 ft)

Population (2024)
  - Total: 442
  - Rank: #353 in Norway
  - Density: 26.7/km^{2} (69/sq mi)
  - Change (10 years): ▼ −9.6%
- Demonym: Trænværing

Official language
  - Norwegian form: Bokmål
- Time zone: UTC+01:00 (CET)
  - Summer (DST): UTC+02:00 (CEST)
- ISO 3166 code: NO-1835
- Website: Official website

Træna is a municipality in Nordland county, Norway. It is part of the Helgeland traditional region. The administrative centre of the municipality is the island/village of Husøya. Other population centres include Selvær and Sanna.

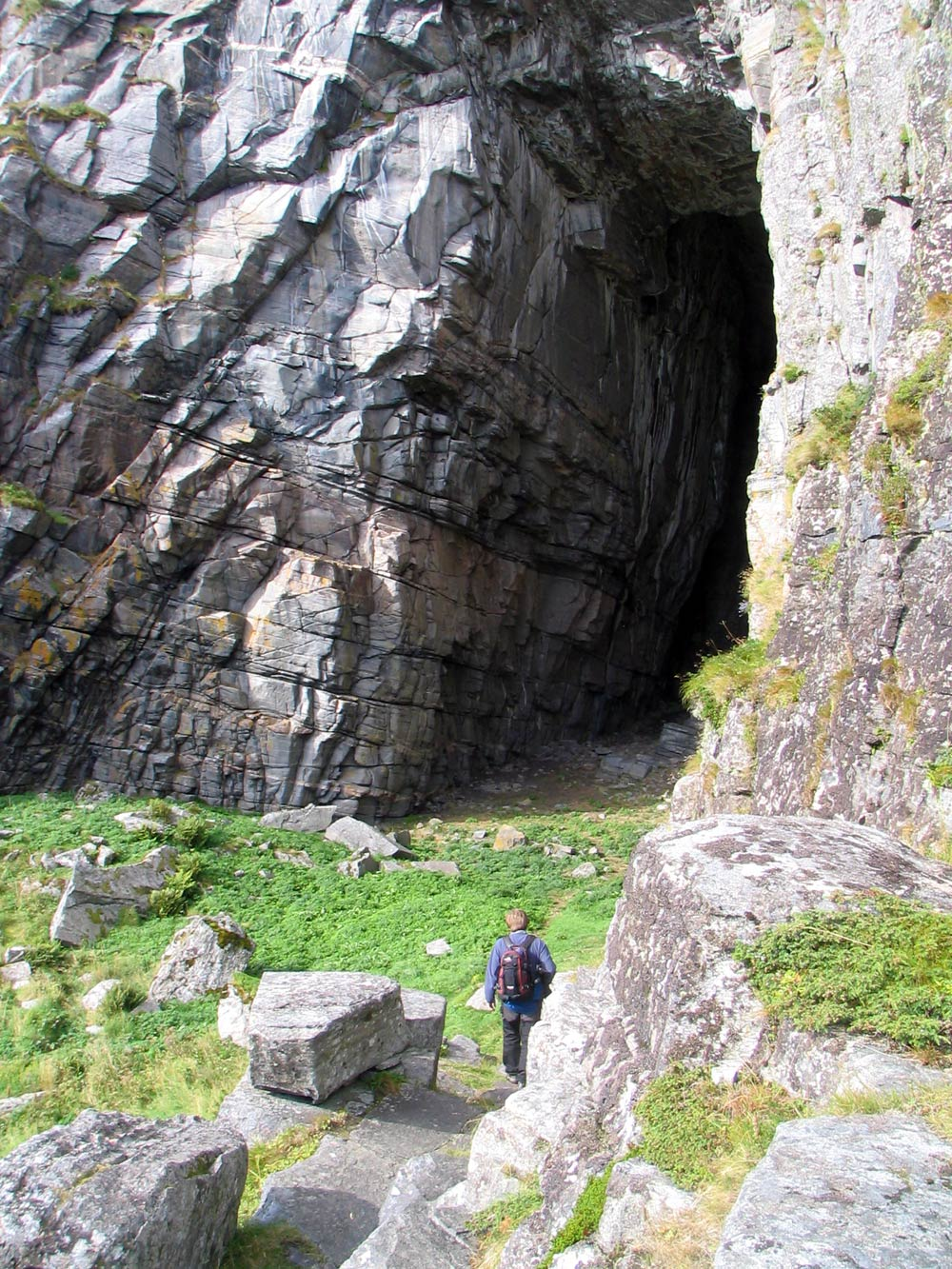
Kirkhelleren cave

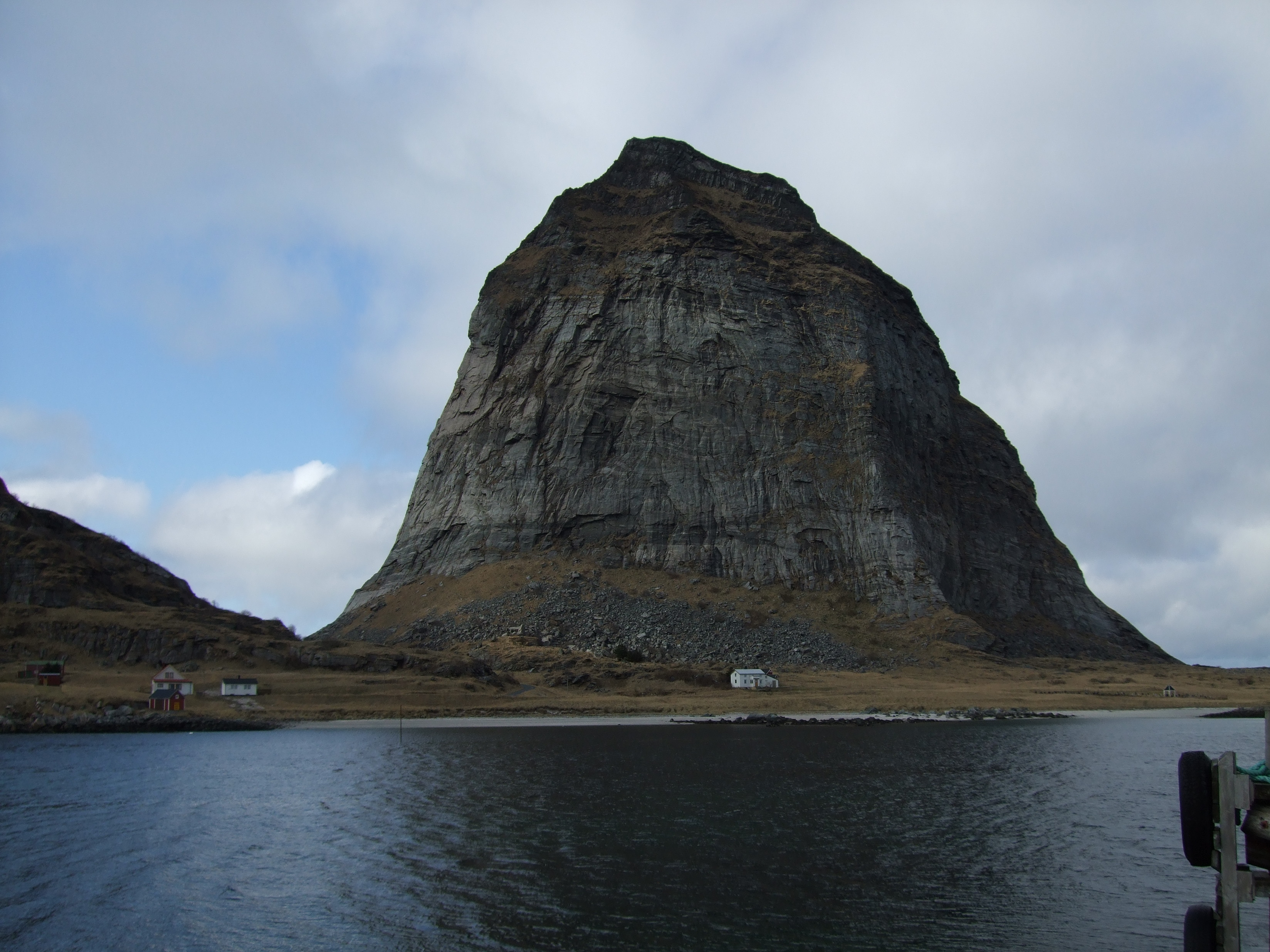
Trænstaven on Sanna island in Træna

Fishing is the economic mainstay of the island municipality of Træna. Connections to mainland Norway are by means of boat and ferry. Routes are provided to Sandnessjøen, Nesna, and Stokkvågen. Each year Træna plays hosts a music festival called Traena Music Festival. The islands of Træna have been the site of a number of archeological discoveries, indicating that the island has been populated since the Stone Age.

The 16.5-square-kilometre (6.4 sq mi) municipality is the 353rd largest by area out of the 357 municipalities in Norway. Træna Municipality is the 353rd most populous municipality in Norway with a population of only 442. The municipality's population density is 26.7 inhabitants per square kilometre (69/sq mi) and its population has decreased by 9.6% over the previous 10-year period.

As of October 2020, there are two regular boat departures per day; authorities have suggested having only one regular departure per day.

== General information ==
The municipality of Træna was established on 1 January 1872 when it was separated from Lurøy Municipality. Initially, Træna had 289 residents. The municipal borders have not changed since that time.

=== Name ===
The municipality (originally the parish) is named after the Træna island group (Old Norse: Þriðna). The meaning of the name is uncertain, but it may be derived from the word þrír which means "three", probably referring to the three peaks on the island. Historically, the name of the municipality was spelled Trænen. On 6 January 1908, a royal resolution changed the spelling of the name of the municipality to Træna.

=== Coat of arms ===
The coat of arms was granted on 24 July 1987. The official blazon is "Gules, three fish-hooks Or two over one" (Norwegian: I rødt tre gull angler, 2-1). This means the arms have a red field (background) and the charge is three fishhooks made of bone from the Stone Age. The fishhooks have a tincture of argent which means they are commonly colored yellow, but if it is made out of metal, then gold is used. These hooks symbolize the importance of fishing in the municipality. They are based on the historic bone hooks found in the local cave Kirkhelleren on the island of Sanna. They are canting arms because there are three hooks and the name Træna originates from a word meaning number "three". The arms were designed by Jarle E. Henriksen.

=== Churches ===
The Church of Norway has one parish (sokn) within Træna Municipality. It is part of the Nord-Helgeland prosti (deanery) in the Diocese of Sør-Hålogaland.

Churches in Træna Municipality
Parish (sokn)	Church name	Location of the church	Year built
Træna	Træna Church	Husøya	1773
Træna	Fiskernes Chapel	Selvær	1887

== Government ==
Træna Municipality is responsible for primary education (through 10th grade), outpatient health services, senior citizen services, welfare and other social services, zoning, economic development, and municipal roads and utilities. The municipality is governed by a municipal council of directly elected representatives. The mayor is indirectly elected by a vote of the municipal council. The municipality is under the jurisdiction of the Helgeland District Court and the Hålogaland Court of Appeal.

=== Municipal council ===
The municipal council (Kommunestyre) of Træna Municipality is made up of 11 representatives that are elected to four year terms. The tables below show the current and historical composition of the council by political party.

Træna kommunestyre 2023–2027
Party name (in Norwegian)	Number of representatives
Labour Party (Arbeiderpartiet)	4
Conservative Party (Høyre)	3
Centre Party (Senterpartiet)	4
Total number of members:	11

Træna kommunestyre 2019–2023
Party name (in Norwegian)	Number of representatives
Labour Party (Arbeiderpartiet)	8
Joint list of the Centre Party (Senterpartiet) and the Christian Democratic Party (Kristelig Folkeparti)	3
Total number of members:	11

Træna kommunestyre 2015–2019
Party name (in Norwegian)	Number of representatives
Labour Party (Arbeiderpartiet)	5
Joint list of the Centre Party (Senterpartiet) and the Christian Democratic Party (Kristelig Folkeparti)	6
Total number of members:	11

Træna kommunestyre 2011–2015
Party name (in Norwegian)	Number of representatives
Labour Party (Arbeiderpartiet)	3
Joint list of the Centre Party (Senterpartiet) and the Christian Democratic Party (Kristelig Folkeparti)	8
Total number of members:	11

Træna kommunestyre 2007–2011
Party name (in Norwegian)	Number of representatives
Labour Party (Arbeiderpartiet)	7
Joint list of the Centre Party (Senterpartiet) and the Christian Democratic Party (Kristelig Folkeparti)	4
Total number of members:	11

Træna kommunestyre 2003–2007
Party name (in Norwegian)	Number of representatives
Labour Party (Arbeiderpartiet)	4
Joint list of the Conservative Party (Høyre) and the Coastal Party (Kystpartiet)	3
Joint list of the Centre Party (Senterpartiet) and the Christian Democratic Party (Kristelig Folkeparti)	4
Total number of members:	11

Træna kommunestyre 1999–2003
Party name (in Norwegian)	Number of representatives
Labour Party (Arbeiderpartiet)	2
Conservative Party (Høyre)	3
Coastal Party (Kystpartiet)	2
Joint list of the Centre Party (Senterpartiet) and the Christian Democratic Party (Kristelig Folkeparti)	6
Total number of members:	13

Træna kommunestyre 1995–1999
Party name (in Norwegian)	Number of representatives
Labour Party (Arbeiderpartiet)	2
Conservative Party (Høyre)	2
Christian Democratic Party (Kristelig Folkeparti)	2
Centre Party (Senterpartiet)	4
Local list (Bygdeliste)	3
Total number of members:	13

Træna kommunestyre 1991–1995
Party name (in Norwegian)	Number of representatives
Labour Party (Arbeiderpartiet)	4
Conservative Party (Høyre)	3
Christian Democratic Party (Kristelig Folkeparti)	2
Centre Party (Senterpartiet)	4
Total number of members:	13

Træna kommunestyre 1987–1991
Party name (in Norwegian)	Number of representatives
Labour Party (Arbeiderpartiet)	5
Conservative Party (Høyre)	3
Christian Democratic Party (Kristelig Folkeparti)	2
Centre Party (Senterpartiet)	3
Total number of members:	13

Træna kommunestyre 1983–1987
Party name (in Norwegian)	Number of representatives
Labour Party (Arbeiderpartiet)	4
Conservative Party (Høyre)	2
Christian Democratic Party (Kristelig Folkeparti)	3
Centre Party (Senterpartiet)	4
Total number of members:	13

Træna kommunestyre 1979–1983
Party name (in Norwegian)	Number of representatives
Labour Party (Arbeiderpartiet)	5
Conservative Party (Høyre)	2
Christian Democratic Party (Kristelig Folkeparti)	3
Centre Party (Senterpartiet)	3
Total number of members:	13

Træna kommunestyre 1975–1979
Party name (in Norwegian)	Number of representatives
Local List(s) (Lokale lister)	13
Total number of members:	13

Træna kommunestyre 1971–1975
Party name (in Norwegian)	Number of representatives
Local List(s) (Lokale lister)	13
Total number of members:	13

Træna kommunestyre 1967–1971
Party name (in Norwegian)	Number of representatives
Local List(s) (Lokale lister)	13
Total number of members:	13

Træna kommunestyre 1963–1967
Party name (in Norwegian)	Number of representatives
Local List(s) (Lokale lister)	13
Total number of members:	13

Træna herredsstyre 1959–1963
Party name (in Norwegian)	Number of representatives
Local List(s) (Lokale lister)	13
Total number of members:	13

Træna herredsstyre 1955–1959
Party name (in Norwegian)	Number of representatives
Local List(s) (Lokale lister)	13
Total number of members:	13

Træna herredsstyre 1951–1955
Party name (in Norwegian)	Number of representatives
Joint List(s) of Non-Socialist Parties (Borgerlige Felleslister)	2
Local List(s) (Lokale lister)	10
Total number of members:	12

Træna herredsstyre 1947–1951
Party name (in Norwegian)	Number of representatives
Local List(s) (Lokale lister)	12
Total number of members:	12

Træna herredsstyre 1945–1947
Party name (in Norwegian)	Number of representatives
Conservative Party (Høyre)	1
Local List(s) (Lokale lister)	11
Total number of members:	12

Træna herredsstyre 1937–1941*
Party name (in Norwegian)	Number of representatives
Joint List(s) of Non-Socialist Parties (Borgerlige Felleslister)	6
Local List(s) (Lokale lister)	6
Total number of members:	12
Note: Due to the German occupation of Norway during World War II, no elections were held for new municipal councils until after the war ended in 1945.

=== Mayors ===
The mayor (Norwegian: ordfører) of Træna Municipality is the political leader of the municipality and the chairperson of the municipal council. Here is a list of people who have held this position:

- 1872–1884: Mikkel Paul Olsen
- 1885–1888: Jakob Jeppesen
- 1889–1890: Mikkel Paul Olsen
- 1891–1892: Jakob Jeppesen
- 1893–1896: Mikkel Paul Olsen
- 1897–1901: Jens Olsen
- 1902–1907: Johan Andersen
- 1908–1913: Jens Olsen
- 1914–1919: Ole Johan August Olsen
- 1920–1928: Anders Olsen
- 1929–1931: Magnus Olsen
- 1932–1937: Anders Olsen
- 1938–1939: Erling Aune
- 1941–1945: Anders Olsen
- 1945–1945: Aksel Sjøset
- 1946–1946: Rolf Røsok Olsen
- 1946–1947: Martin Sandøy
- 1948–1955: Anders Olsen
- 1955–1971: Leif Holmen
- 1972–1979: Arnold Sørhaug (LL)
- 1979–1987: Albert Johansen (Sp)
- 1987–1991: Geir Ståle Bjørnvik (H)
- 1991–2003: Idar Jørgen Holmen (Sp)
- 2003–2011: Aina Willumsen (Ap)
- 2011–2019: Per Pedersen (KrF)
- 2019–2023: Jan Helge Andersen (Ap)
- 2023–present: Trond Vegard Sletten (Ap)

== Geography ==
The municipality consists of 477 islands and skerries off the coast of mainland Norway. Four of the islands are populated: Husøya, Selvær, Sanna, and Sandøy. The islands lie along the Trænfjorden to the southeast and the Norwegian Sea to the west. Træna Lighthouse is located in the southern part of the municipality. The highest point in the municipality is the 336.74-metre (1,104.8 ft) tall mountain Trænstaven.

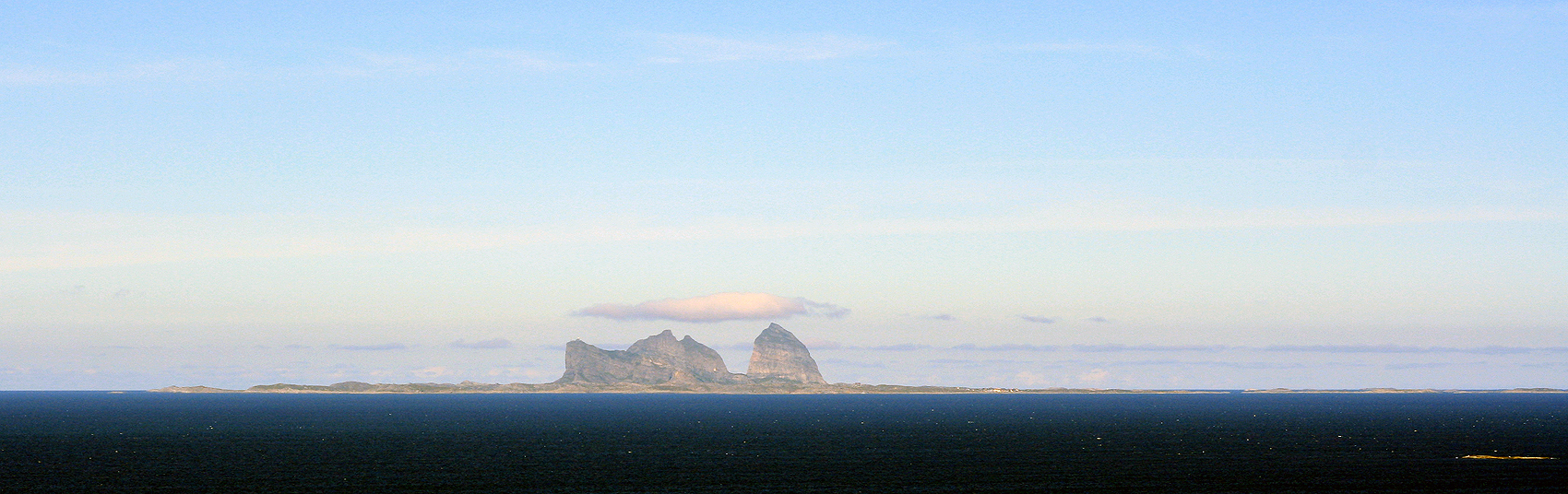
Træna seen from Lovund

=== Farms of Træna ===
Træna, from 1920 census
Farms:
1 Husøen
2 Ærøen
3 Hikelen
4 Sande
5 Sandøen
6 Rødskjærholmen
7 Dørvær
8 Selvær
9 Træna kirke (church) (built 1773)
10 Fiskernes kirke (chapel) (built 1887)

Historically, the land of Træna was divided up into named farms. These farms were used in census and tax records and are useful for genealogical research.

==== Farm names and numbers ====
The farms in Træna Municipality are listed in O. Rygh's series Norske_Gaardnavne ("Norwegian farm names"), the Nordland volume of which was published in 1905.

See also: Digital version of Norske Gaardnavne - Nordland (in Norwegian)

The farm numbers are used in some census records, and numbers that are near each other indicate that those farms are geographically proximate. Handwritten Norwegian sources, particularly those prior to 1800, may use variants on these names. For recorded variants before 1723, see the digital version of O. Rygh.

Farm names were often used as part of Norwegian names, in addition to the person's given name and patronymic or inherited surname. Some families retained the farm name, or toponymic, as a surname when they emigrated, so in those cases tracing a surname may tell you specifically where in Norway the family was from. This tradition began to change in the mid to late 19th century, and inherited surnames were codified into law in 1923.

If you can't find an entry when you are searching for a word that starts with AE, Ae, O, A or Aa, it may have been transcribed from one of the letters not used in English. Try looking for it under the Norwegian letter; Æ, Ø, and Å appear at the end of the Norwegian alphabet

Farm Name	Farm Number
Husøen	1
Ærøen	2
Hikelen	3
Sande	4
Sandøen	5
Rødskjærholmen	6
Dørvær	7
Selvær	8
