= Rønvik Church =

Church in Nordland, Norway

- Rønvik kirke
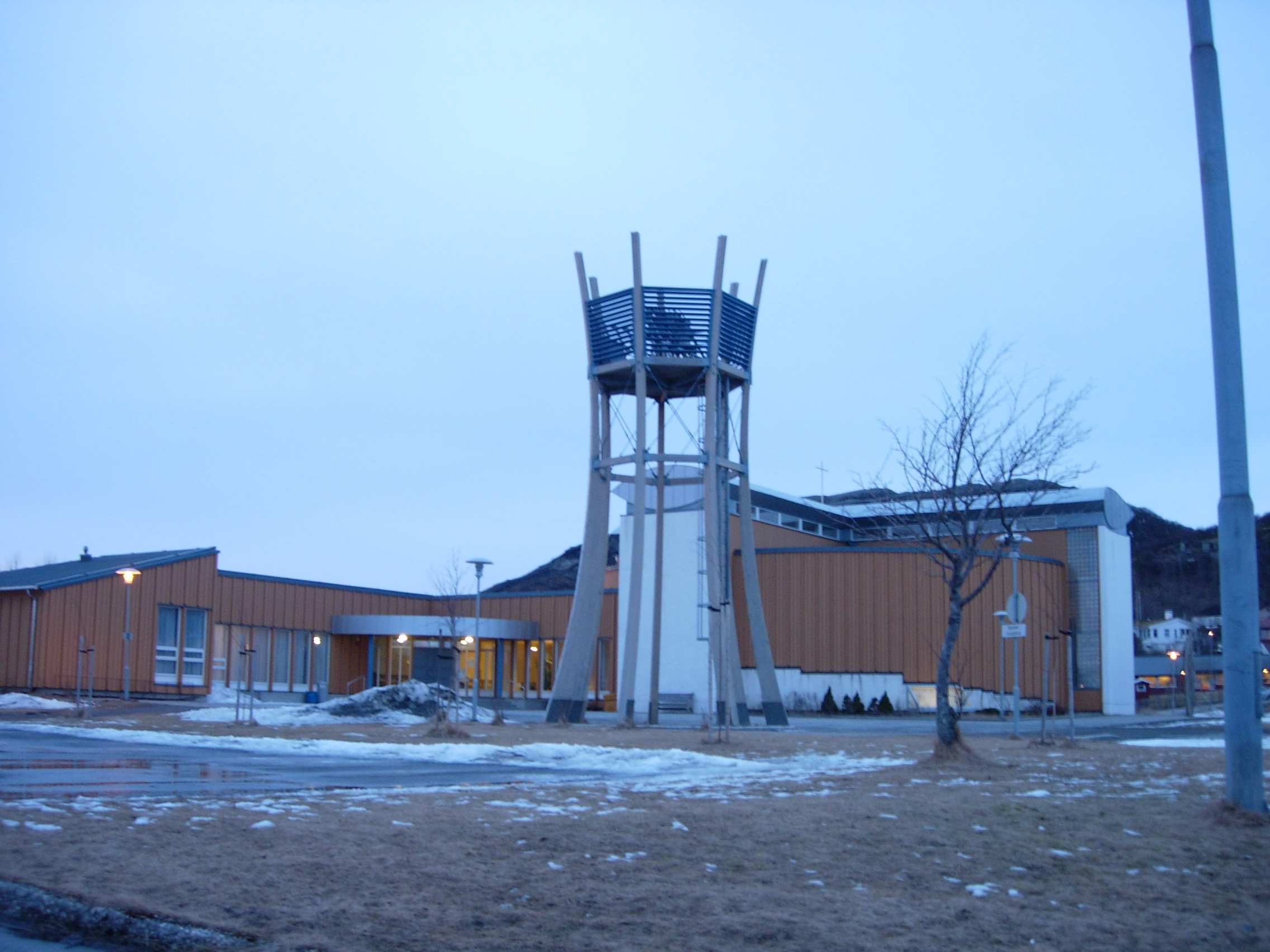
- View of the church
- Rønvik Church
- 67.2951126°N 14.4162902°E
- Location: Bodø Municipality, Nordland
- Country: Norway
- Denomination: Church of Norway
- Churchmanship: Evangelical Lutheran

History
- Status: Parish church
- Founded: 1997
- Consecrated: 30 November 1997

Architecture
- Functional status: Active
- Architect: Reidar Berg
- Architectural type: Circular
- Completed: 1997 (29 years ago)

Specifications
- Capacity: 500
- Materials: Brick and concrete

Administration
- Diocese: Sør-Hålogaland
- Deanery: Bodø domprosti
- Parish: Kjerringøy og Rønvik

Rønvik Church (Norwegian: Rønvik kirke) is a parish church of the Church of Norway in Bodø Municipality in Nordland county, Norway. It is located in the northern part of the town of Bodø. It is one of two churches for the Kjerringøy og Rønvik parish which is part of the Bodø domprosti (deanery) in the Diocese of Sør-Hålogaland. The orange/tan church was built out of brick and concrete in a circular style in 1997 using plans drawn up by the architect Reidar Berg. The church seats about 500 people. The building was consecrated on 30 November 1997.

== See also ==
- List of churches in Sør-Hålogaland
