= Kjeldebotn Church =

Church in Nordland, Norway

- Kjeldebotn kirke
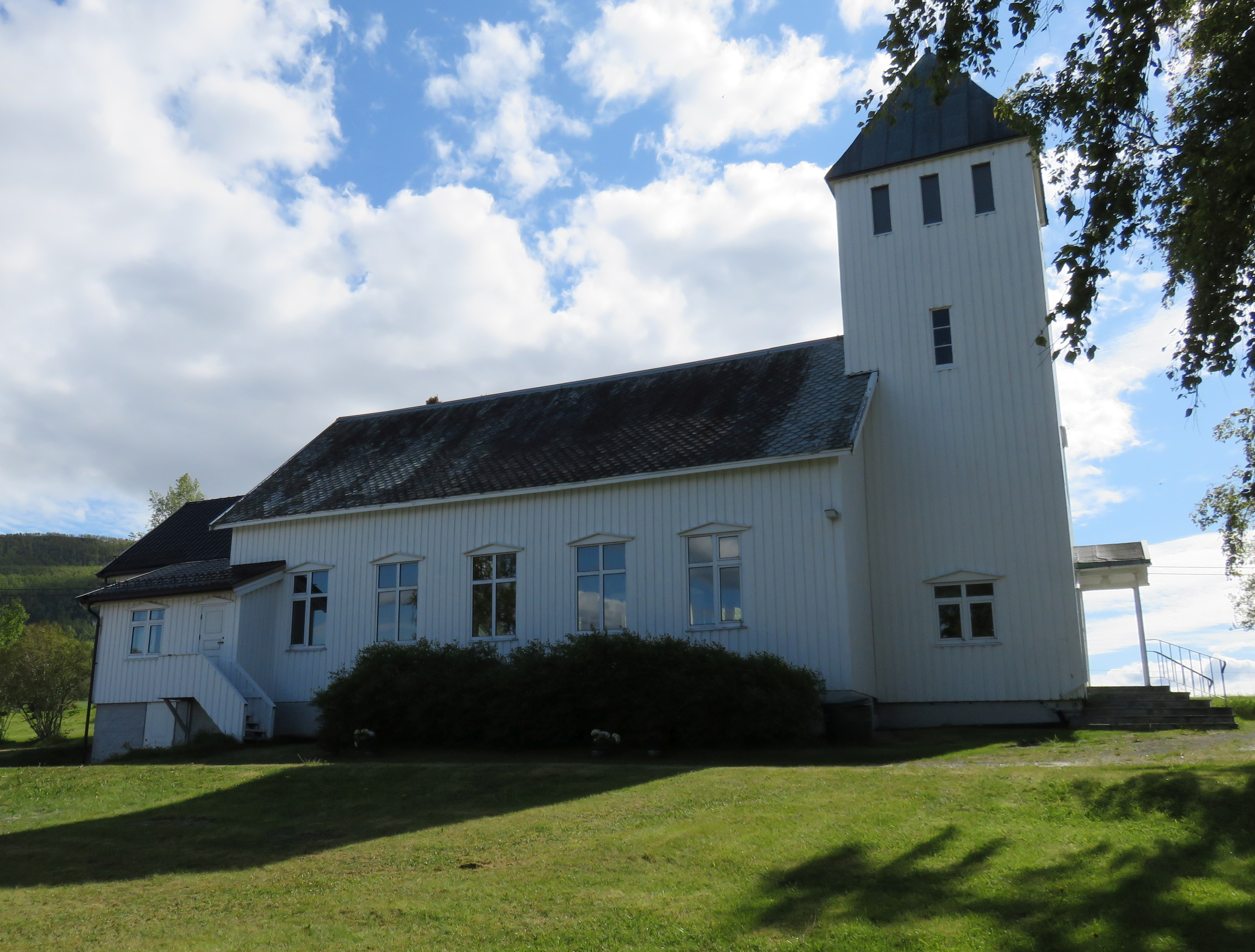
- View of the church
- Kjeldebotn Church
- 68.4054171°N 16.6604490°E
- Location: Narvik Municipality, Nordland
- Country: Norway
- Denomination: Church of Norway
- Churchmanship: Evangelical Lutheran

History
- Status: Parish church
- Founded: 1956
- Consecrated: 1956

Architecture
- Functional status: Active
- Architect(s): Liv and Alf Bugge
- Architectural type: Long church
- Completed: 1956 (70 years ago)

Specifications
- Capacity: 200
- Materials: Wood

Administration
- Diocese: Sør-Hålogaland
- Deanery: Ofoten prosti
- Parish: Ballangen
- Norwegian Cultural Heritage Site
- Type: Church
- Status: Not protected
- ID: 84782

Kjeldebotn Church (Norwegian: Kjeldebotn kirke) is a parish church of the Church of Norway in Narvik Municipality in Nordland county, Norway. It is located in the village of Kjeldebotn. It is one of the churches for the Ballangen parish which is part of the Ofoten prosti (deanery) in the Diocese of Sør-Hålogaland. The white, wooden church was built in a long church style in 1956 using plans drawn up by the architects Liv and Alf Bugge. The church seats about 200 people. The church holds at least one worship service each month.

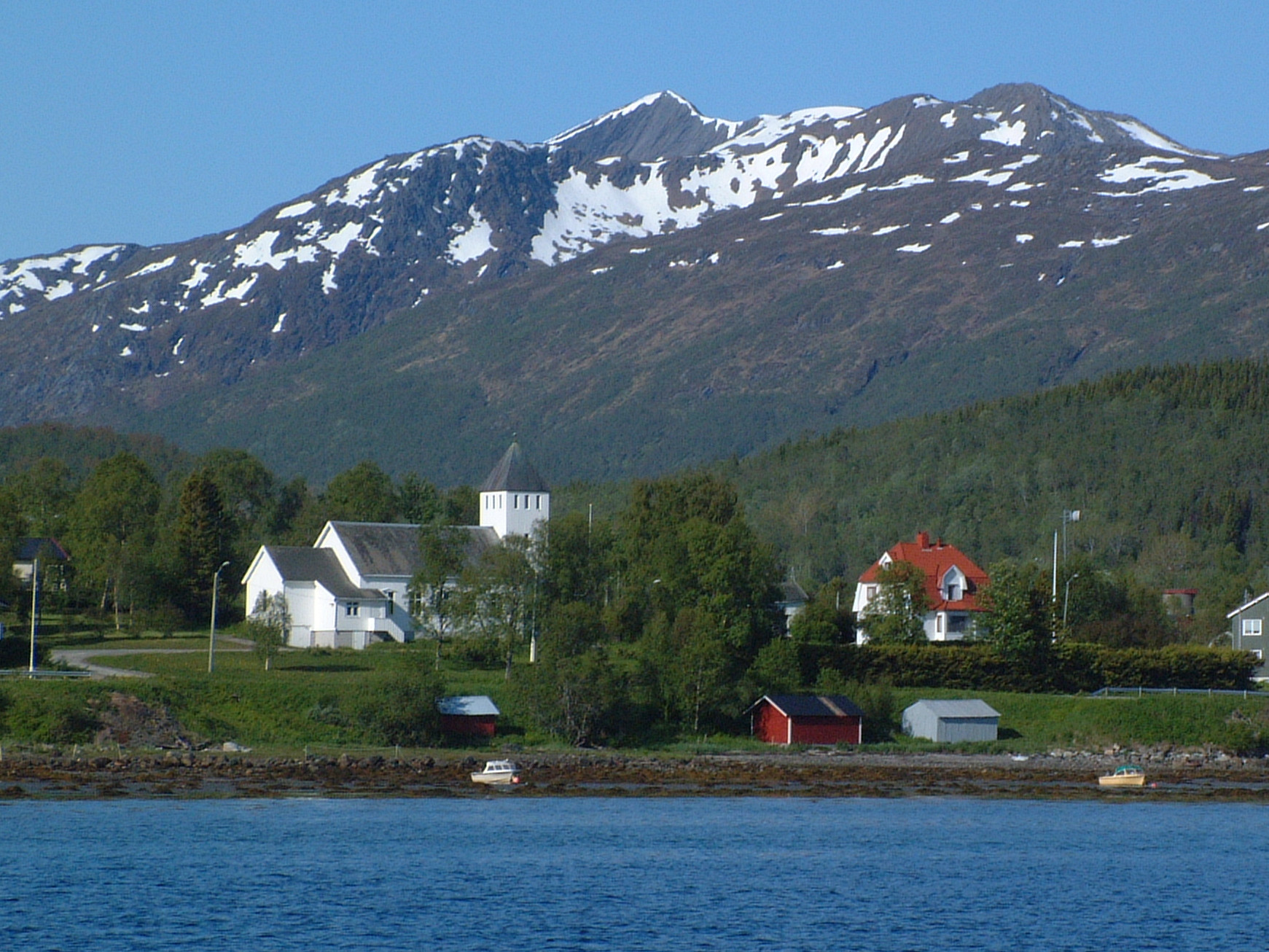
View of the church from a distance

== See also ==
- List of churches in Sør-Hålogaland
