= Gruben Church =

Church in Nordland, Norway

- Gruben kirke
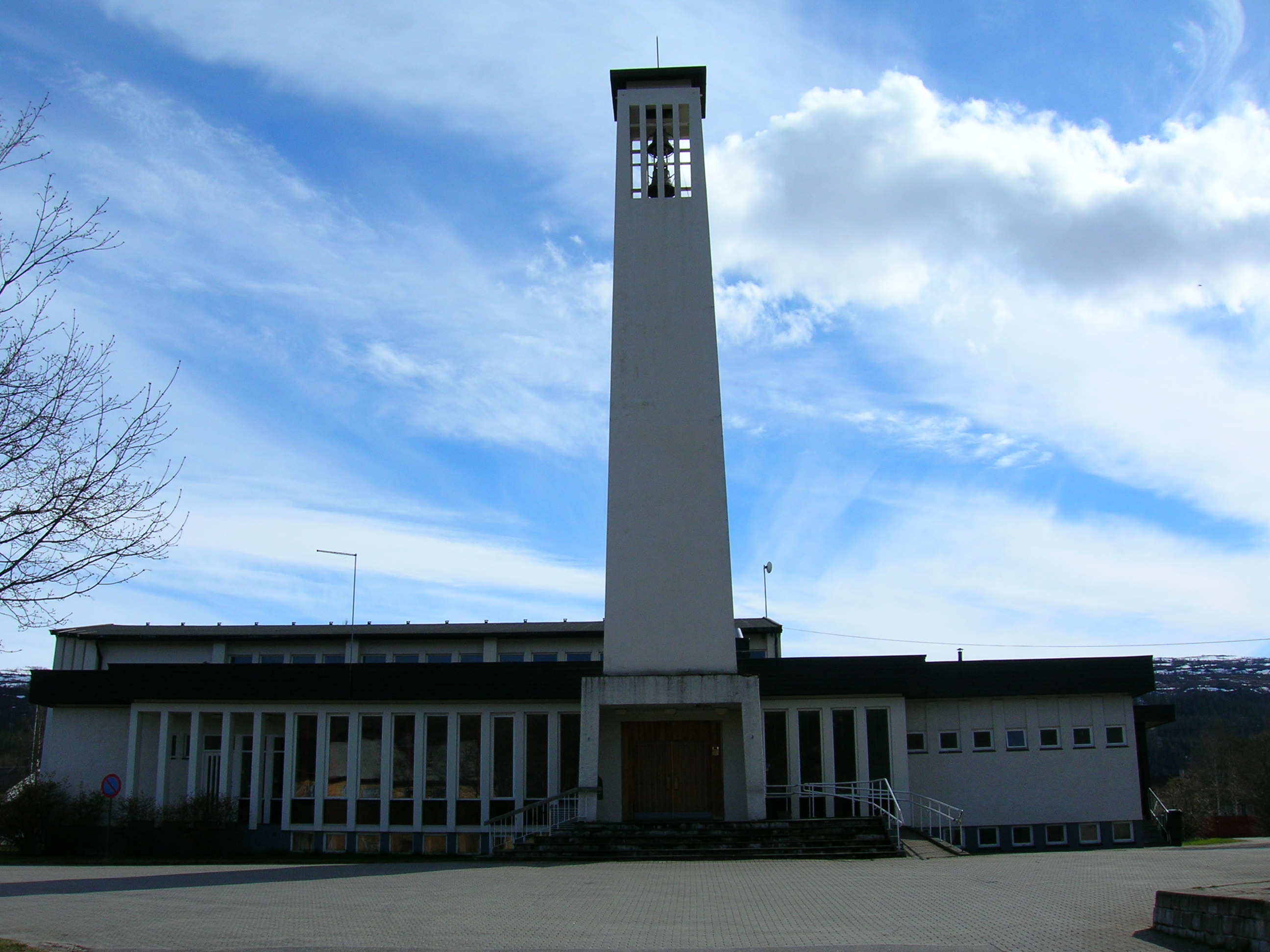
- View of the church
- Gruben Church
- 66.31585028°N 14.19462427°E
- Location: Rana Municipality, Nordland
- Country: Norway
- Denomination: Church of Norway
- Churchmanship: Evangelical Lutheran

History
- Status: Parish church
- Founded: 1965
- Consecrated: 1965

Architecture
- Functional status: Active
- Architect: Nils Toft
- Architectural type: Long church
- Completed: 1965 (61 years ago)

Specifications
- Capacity: 550
- Materials: Concrete

Administration
- Diocese: Sør-Hålogaland
- Deanery: Indre Helgeland prosti
- Parish: Gruben
- Norwegian Cultural Heritage Site
- Type: Church
- Status: Not protected
- ID: 84433

Gruben Church (Norwegian: Gruben kirke) is a parish church of the Church of Norway in Rana Municipality in Nordland county, Norway. It is located in the eastern part of the town of Mo i Rana. It is the church for the Gruben parish, which is part of the Indre Helgeland prosti (deanery) in the Diocese of Sør-Hålogaland. The white, concrete church was built in a long church style in 1965, using plans drawn up by the architect Nils Toft. The church seats about 550 people.

== See also ==
- List of churches in Sør-Hålogaland
