= Saltstraumen Church =

Church in Nordland, Norway

- Saltstraumen kirke
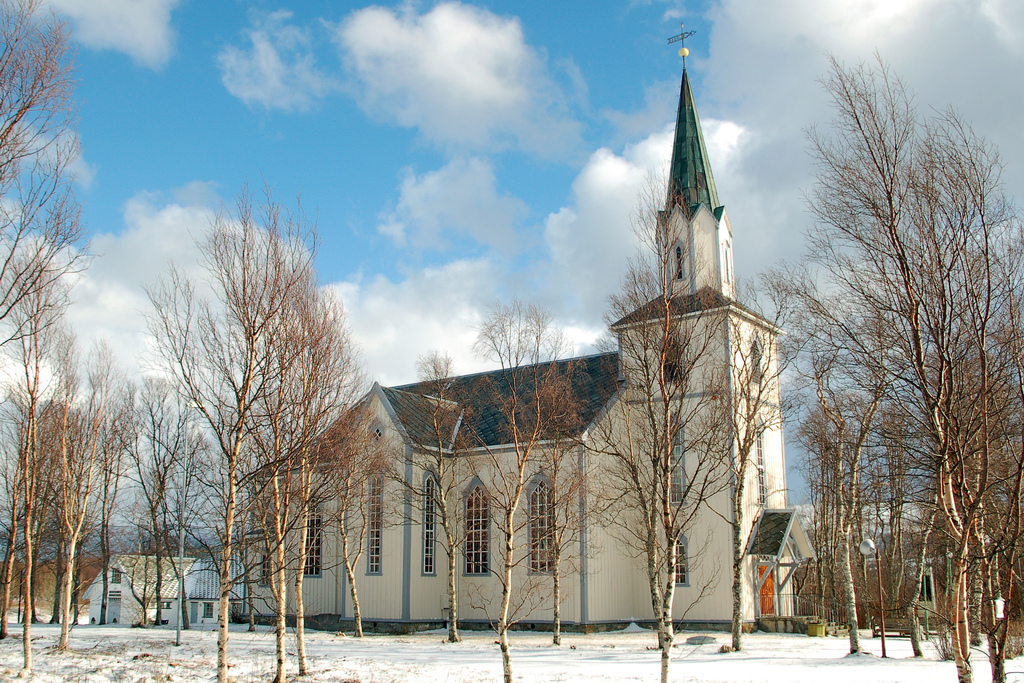
- View of the church
- Saltstraumen Church
- 67.2335095°N 14.62547690°E
- Location: Bodø Municipality, Nordland
- Country: Norway
- Denomination: Church of Norway
- Churchmanship: Evangelical Lutheran

History
- Status: Parish church
- Founded: 1886
- Consecrated: 1886
- Events: Moved in 1900

Architecture
- Functional status: Active
- Architect: J. E. Olsen
- Architectural type: Long church
- Completed: 1886 (140 years ago)

Specifications
- Capacity: 370
- Materials: Wood

Administration
- Diocese: Sør-Hålogaland
- Deanery: Bodø domprosti
- Parish: Saltstraumen
- Norwegian Cultural Heritage Site
- Type: Church
- Status: Not protected
- ID: 85365

Saltstraumen Church (Norwegian: Saltstraumen kirke) is a parish church of the Church of Norway in Bodø Municipality in Nordland county, Norway. It is located in the village of Saltstraumen. It is one of the two churches for the Saltstraumen parish which is part of the Bodø domprosti (deanery) in the Diocese of Sør-Hålogaland. The white, wooden church was built in a long church style in 1886 using plans drawn up by the architect J. E. Olsen. The church seats about 370 people.

== History ==
The church was originally built in 1886. Around 1900, the building was moved about 300 metres (980 ft) to the northwest from its original location due to soil instability. The cemetery remained at the original site.

== Media gallery ==
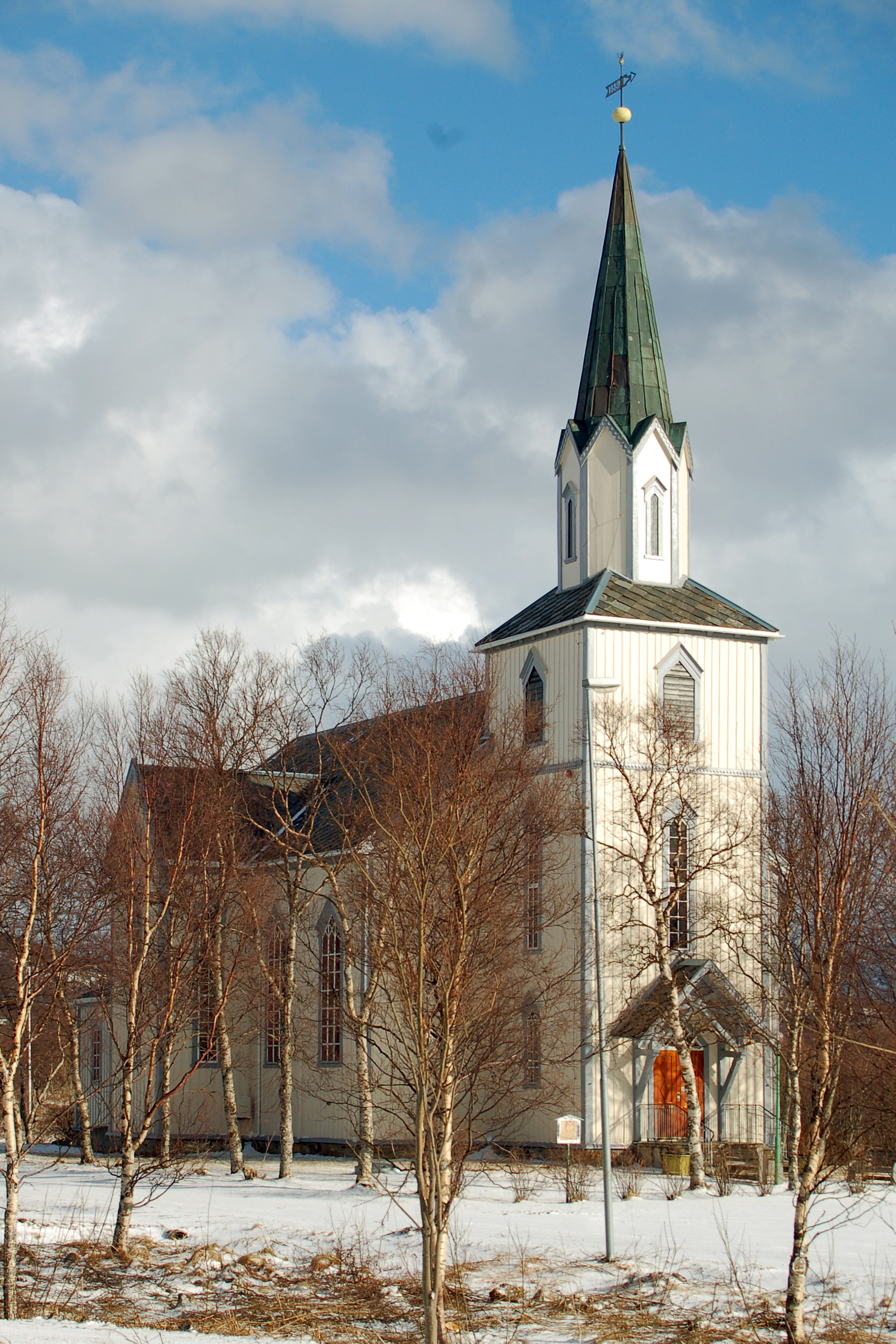

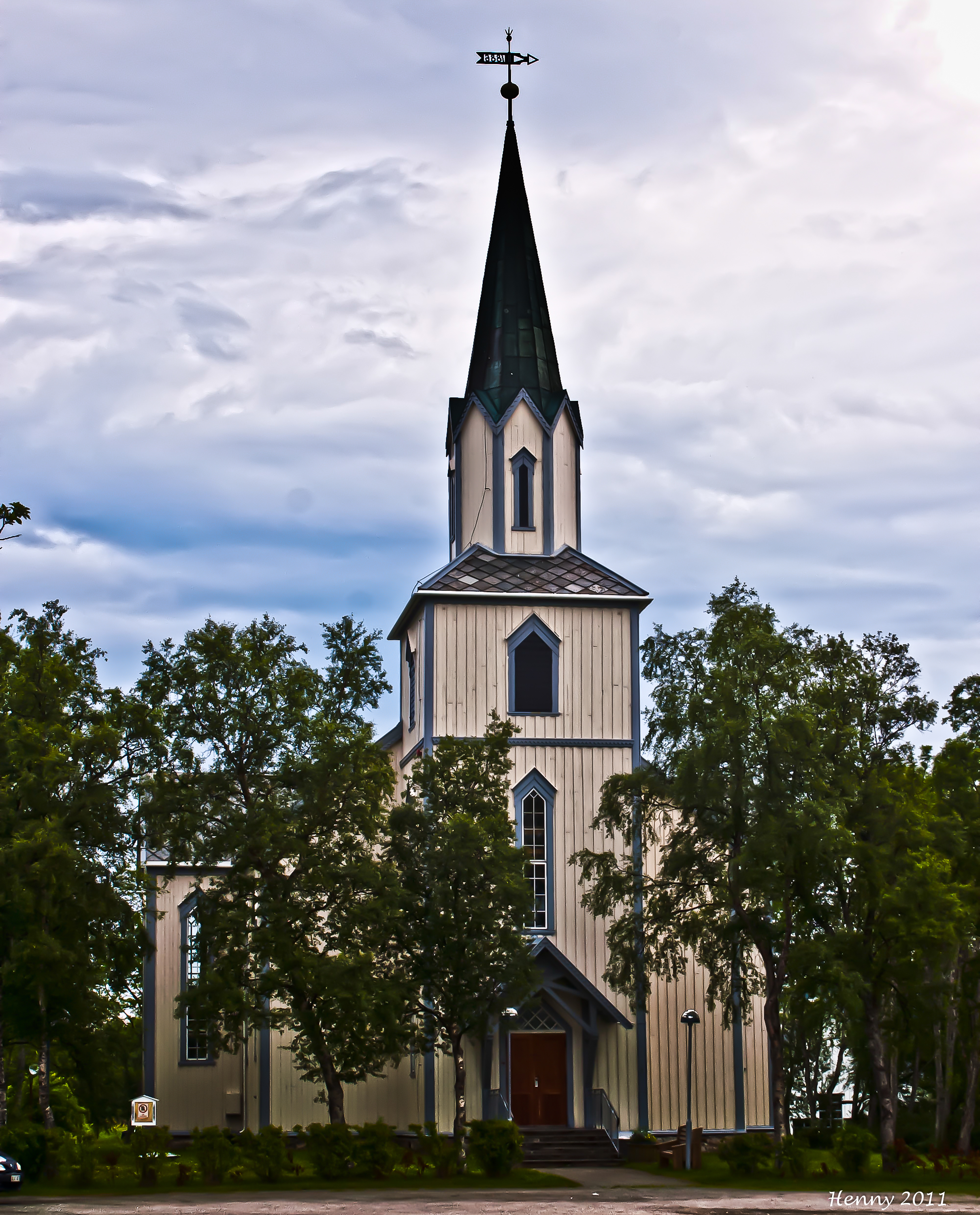

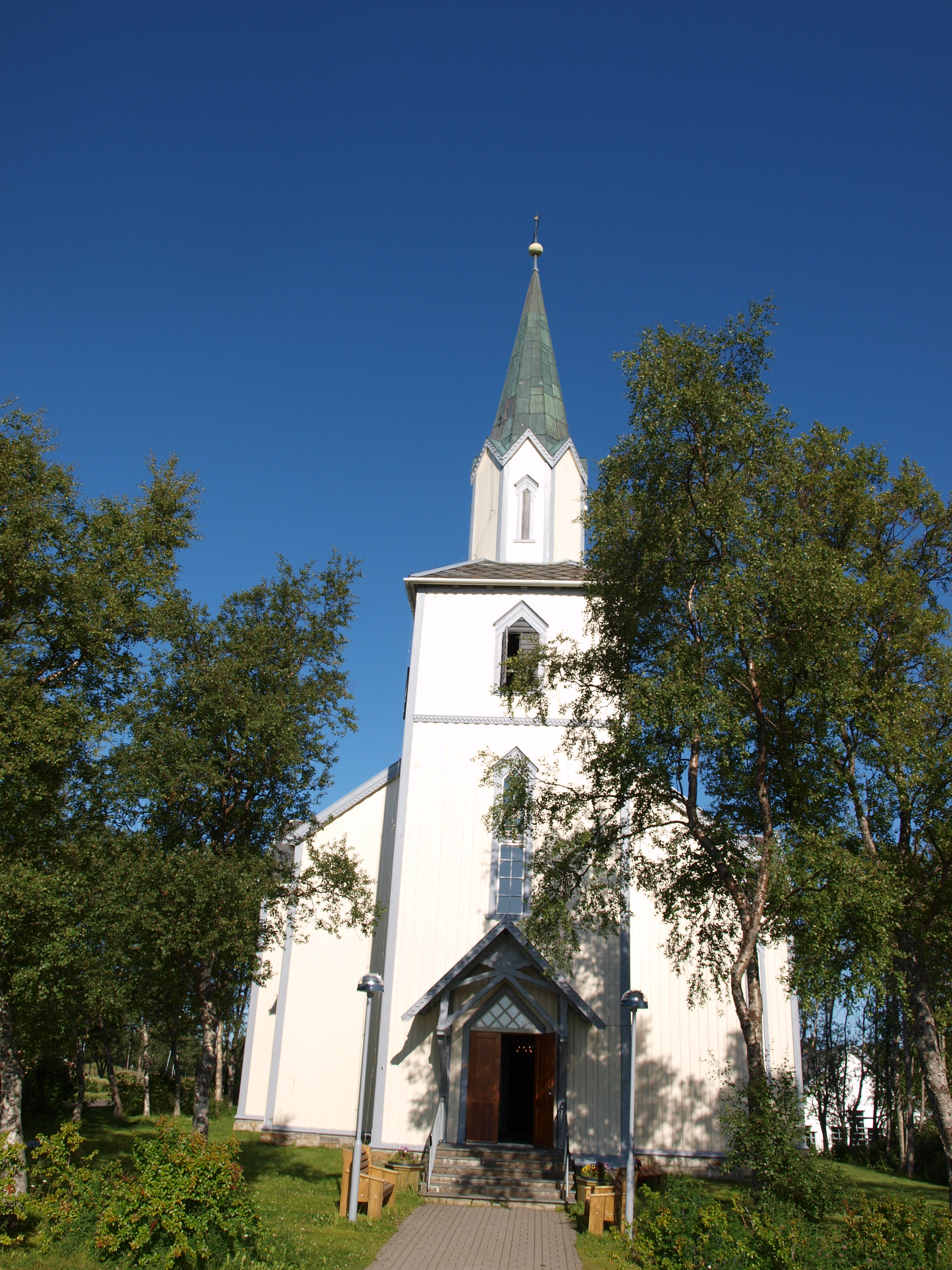

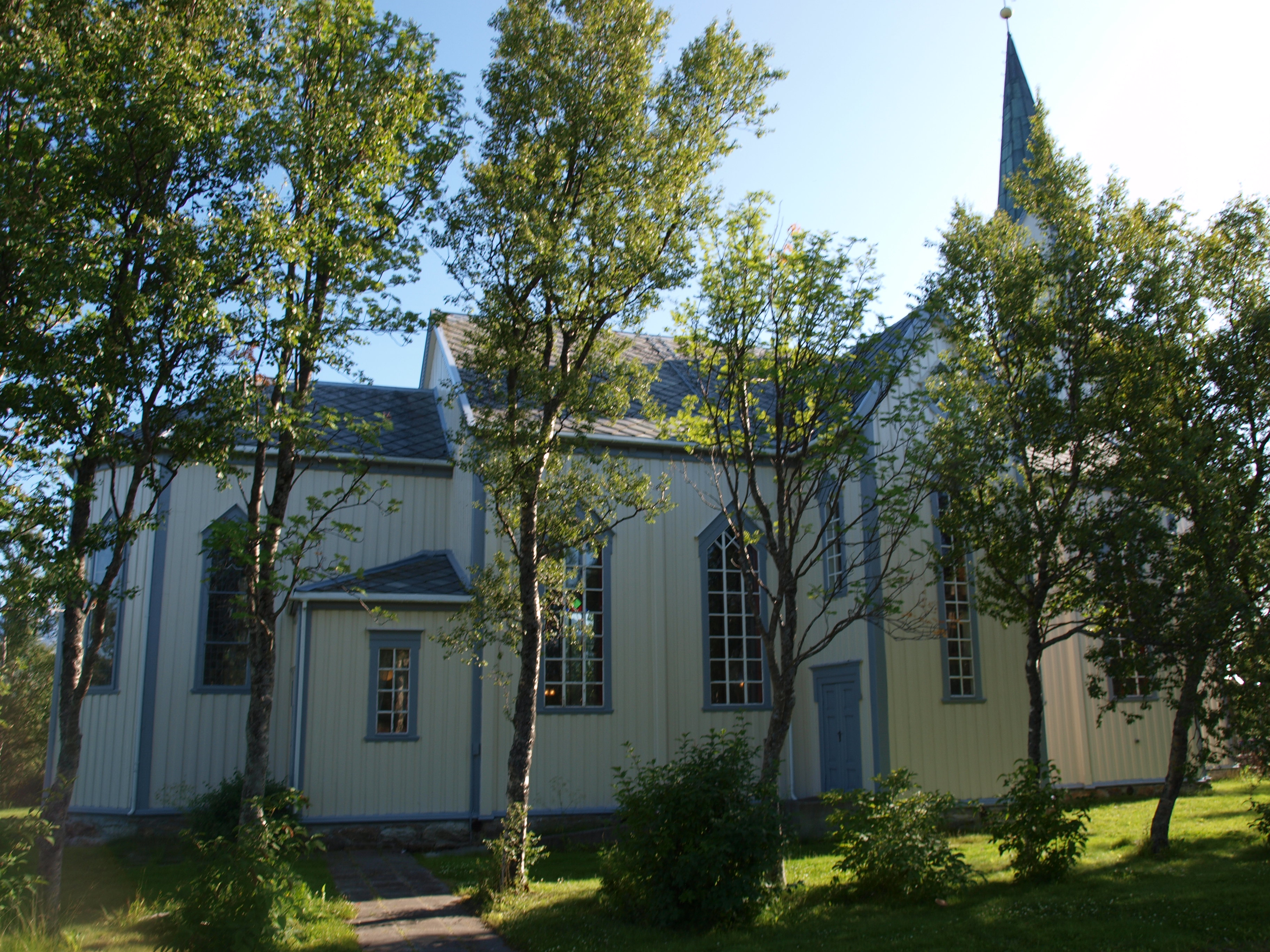

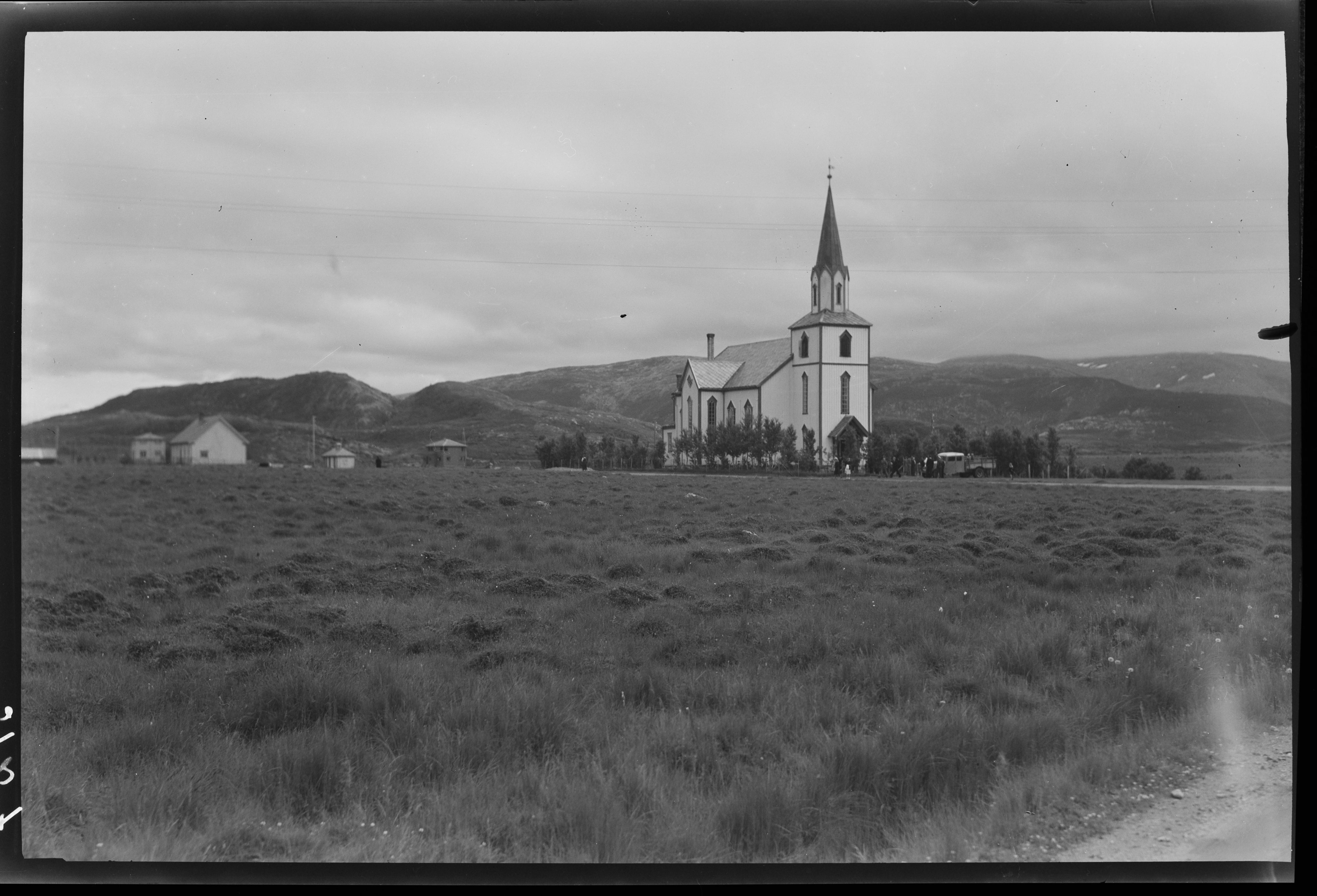

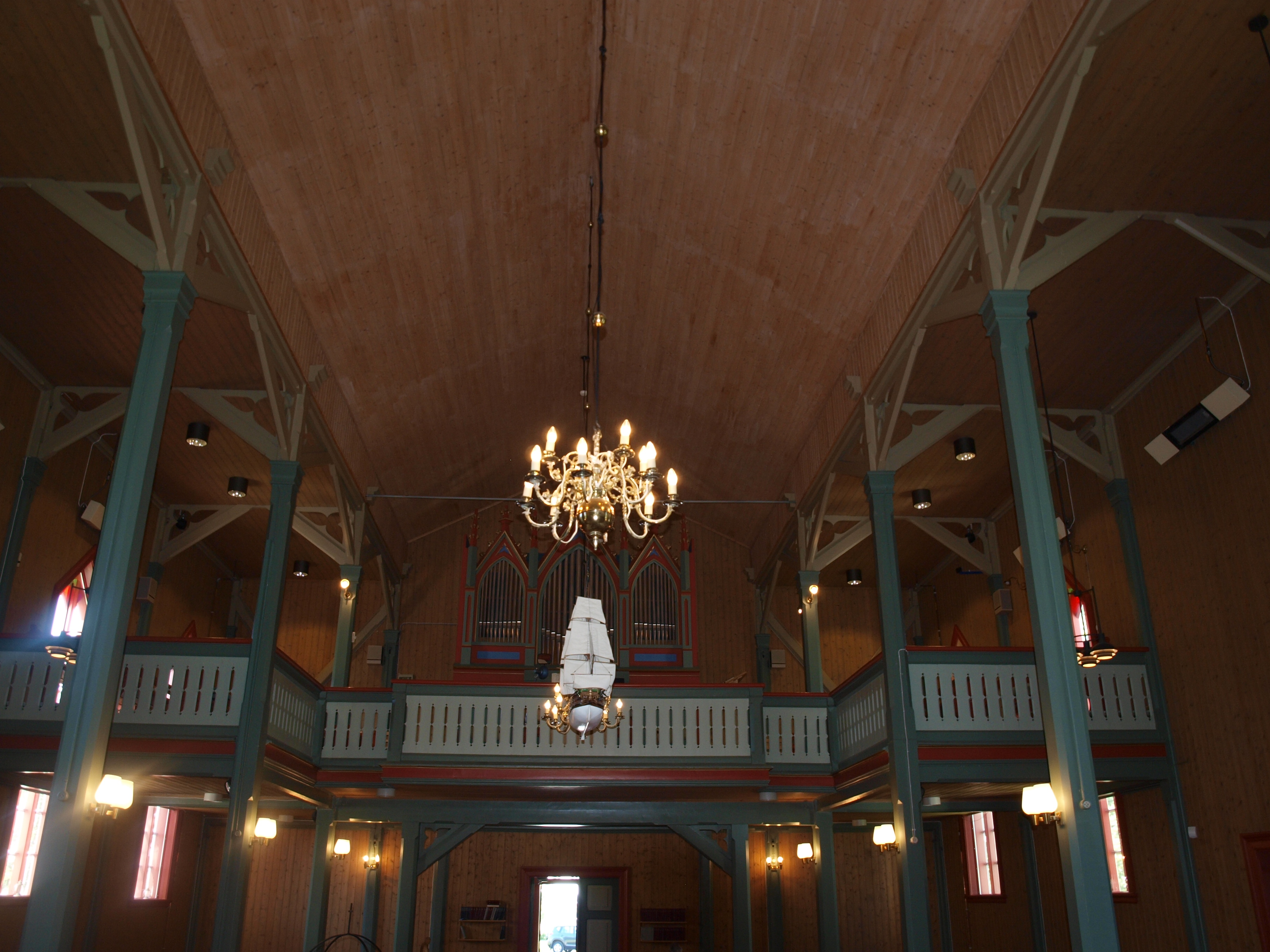

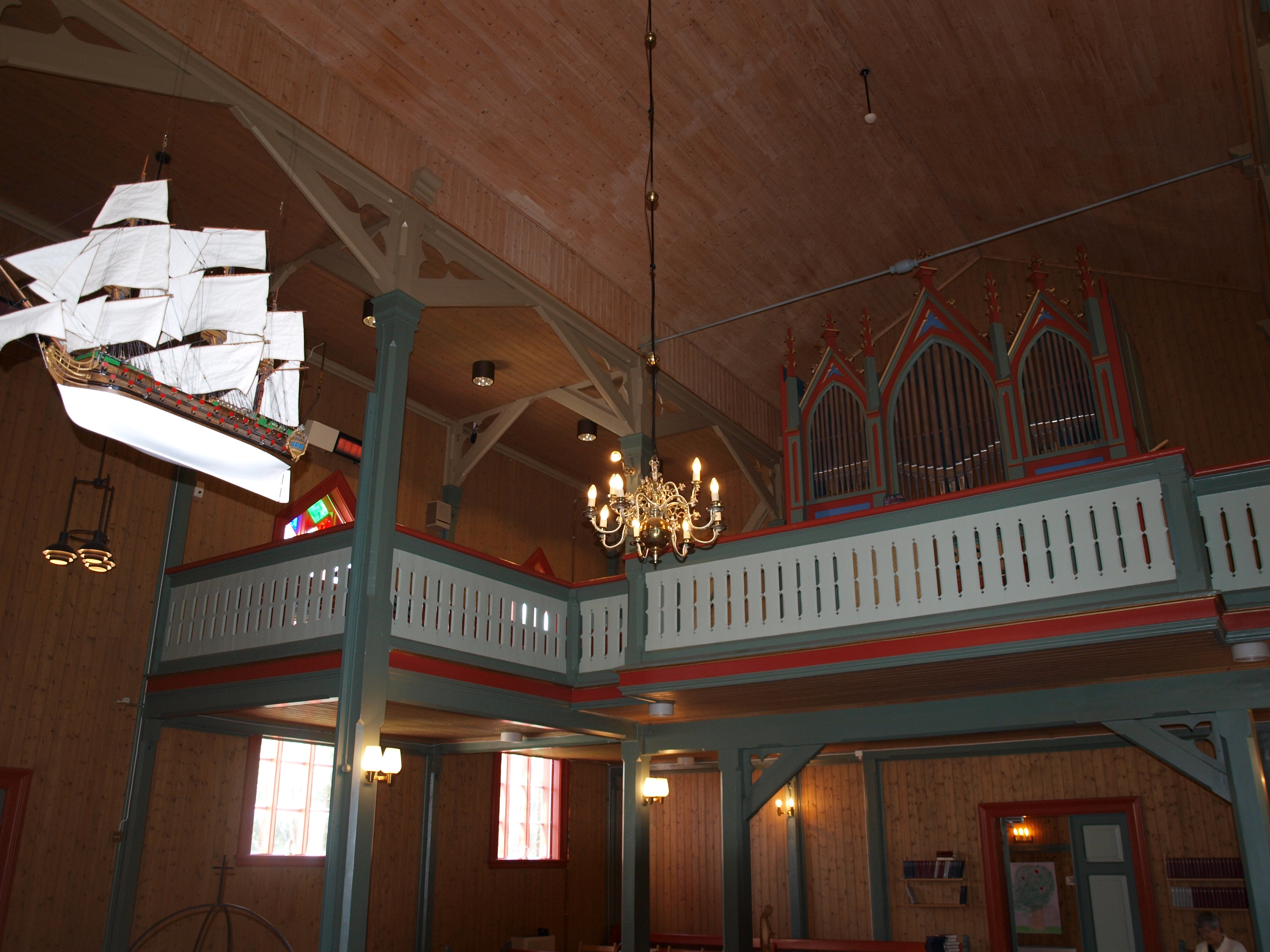

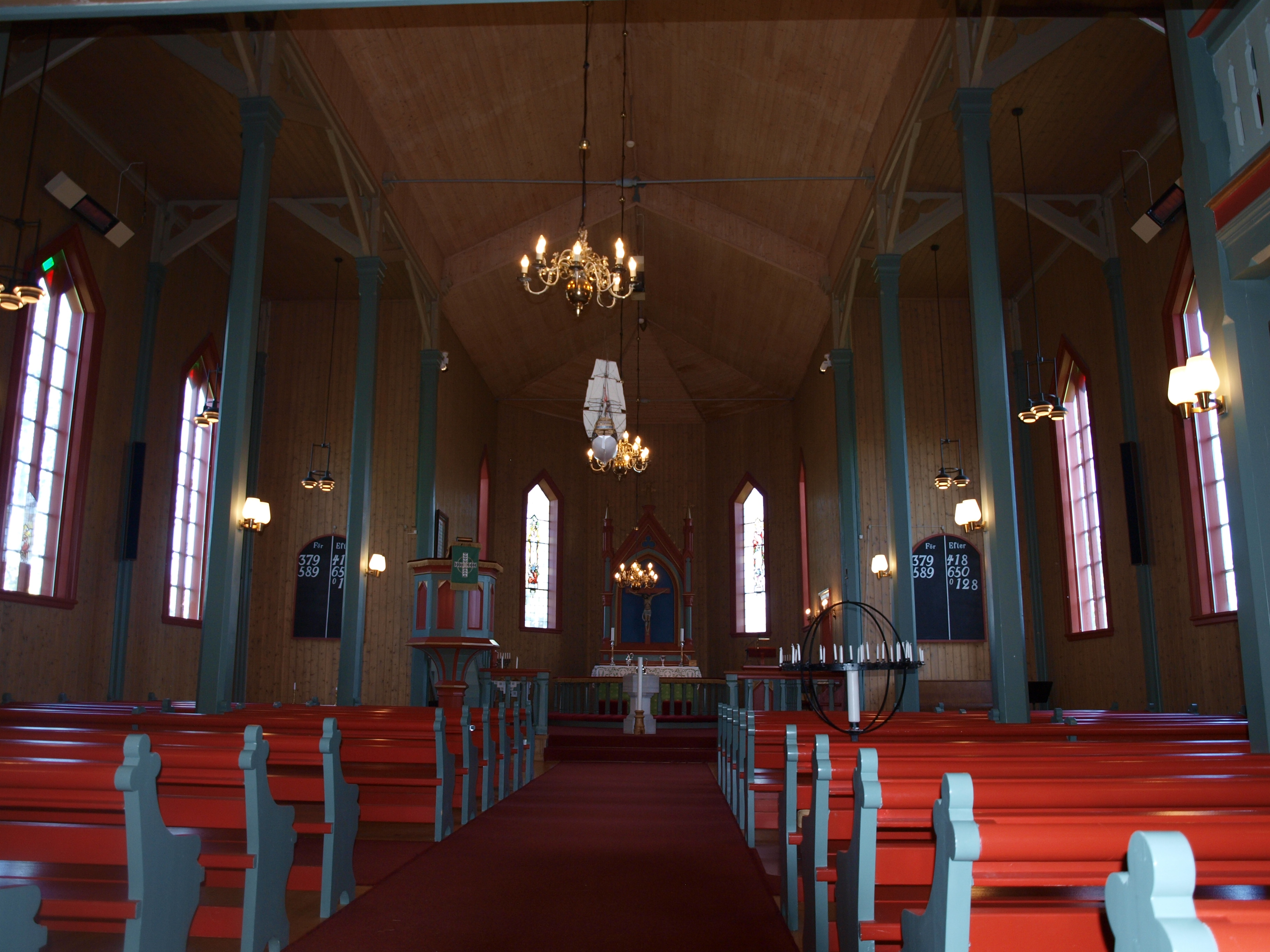

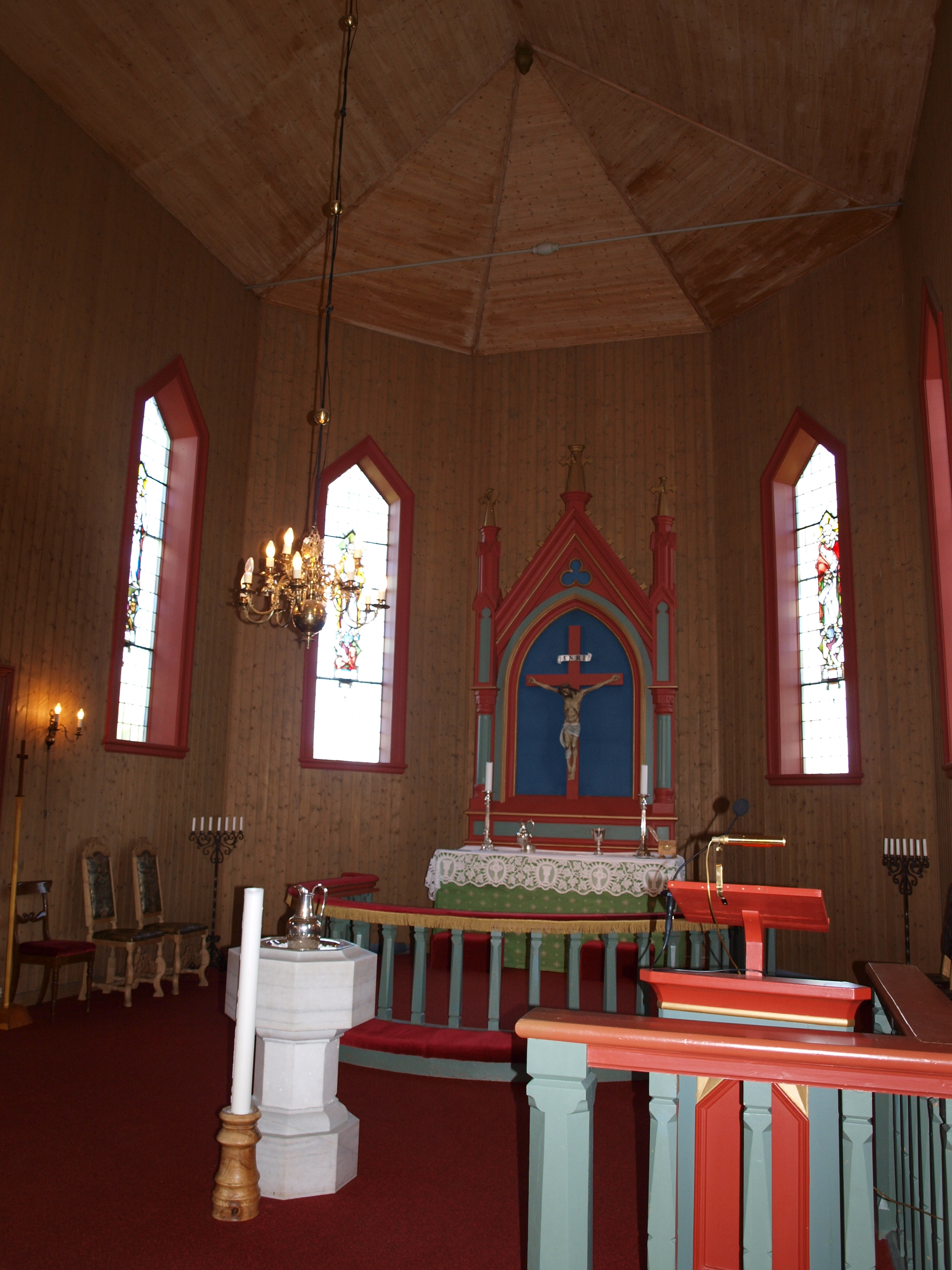

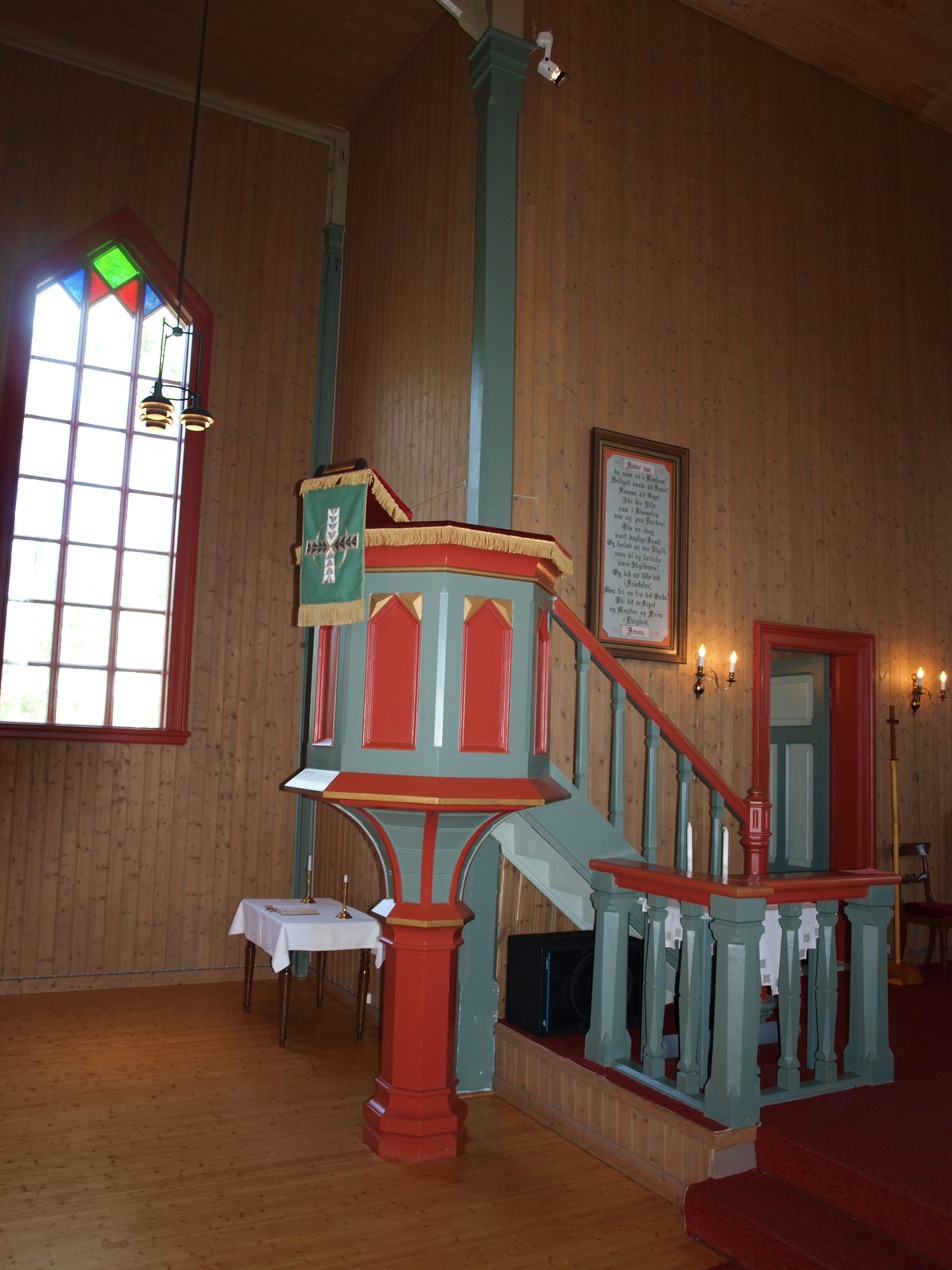

== See also ==
- List of churches in Sør-Hålogaland
