= List of churches in Sør-Hålogaland =

Map of the church deaneries in the Diocese of Sør-Hålogaland.

This list of churches in Sør-Hålogaland is a list of the Church of Norway churches in the Diocese of Sør-Hålogaland in Norway. It includes all of the parishes in Nordland county. The diocese is based at the Bodø Cathedral in the city of Bodø in Bodø Municipality.

The list is divided into several sections, one for each deanery (prosti; headed by a provost) in the diocese. Administratively within each deanery, the churches within each municipality elects their own church council (fellesråd). Each municipality may have one or more parishes (sokn) within the municipality. Each parish elects their own councils (soknerådet). Each parish has one or more local church. The number and size of the deaneries and parishes has changed over time.

== Bodø domprosti ==
This arch-deanery (Norwegian: domprosti) is home to the Bodø Cathedral, the seat of the Bishop of the Diocese of Sør-Hålogaland. Bodø domprosti covers the five municipalities of Bodø, Gildeskål, Meløy, Røst, and Værøy. The deanery is headquartered at Bodø Cathedral in the town of Bodø in Bodø Municipality.

This deanery was established as Bodø prosti on 1 June 1901 when the old Søndre Salten prosti was divided into Bodø prosti (Bodø, Bodin, Kjerringøy, and Folda) and Søndre Salten prosti (Gildeskål, Beiarn, Skjerstad, and Saltdal). The deanery was upgraded to an arch-deanery (Norwegian: domprosti) in 1952 when the Diocese of Sør-Hålogaland was created.

Municipality	Parish (sokn)	Church	Location	Year built	Photo
Bodø	Bodin	Bodin Church	Bodø	1240	
Bodø	Bodin	Helligvær Church	Helligvær	1899	
Bodø	Bodin	Landegode Church	Fenes	1920	
Bodø	Bodø Domkirke	Bodø Cathedral	Bodø	1956	
Bodø	Innstranden	Hunstad Church	Bodø	2013	
Bodø	Kjerringøy og Rønvik	Kjerringøy Church	Kjerringøy	1883	
Bodø	Kjerringøy og Rønvik	Rønvik Church	Bodø	1997	
Bodø	Misvær og Skjerstad	Misvær Church	Misvær	1912	
Bodø	Misvær og Skjerstad	Skjerstad Church	Skjerstad	1959	
Bodø	Saltstraumen	Saltstraumen Church	Saltstraumen	1886	
Bodø	Saltstraumen	Tverlandet Church	Løding	1983	
Gildeskål	Gildeskål	Gildeskål Church	Inndyr	1881	
Gildeskål	Gildeskål	Old Gildeskål Church	Inndyr	12th century	
Gildeskål	Gildeskål	Saura Church	Saura	1884	
Gildeskål	Gildeskål	Mevik Chapel	Mevik	1910	
Gildeskål	Gildeskål	Nordstranda Chapel	Lekanger	1963	
Gildeskål	Gildeskål	Sørfjorden Chapel	Sørfinnset	1957	
Meløy	Fore og Meløy	Fore Church	Reipå	1909	
Meløy	Fore og Meløy	Meløy Church	Meløya	1867	
Meløy	Fore og Meløy	Ørnes Church	Ørnes	1990	
Meløy	Glomfjord	Glomfjord Church	Glomfjord	1957	
Meløy	Halsa	Halsa Church	Halsa	1960	
Røst	Røst	Røst Church	Røstlandet	1899	
Værøy	Værøy	Værøy Church	Sørland	1939	
Værøy	Værøy	Old Værøy Church	Nordland	1799	

== Lofoten prosti ==
This deanery (Norwegian: prosti) covers four municipalities in the Lofoten island district of Nordland county. It includes the parishes in the municipalities of Flakstad, Moskenes, Vestvågøy, and Vågan. The deanery is headquartered at Svolvær Church in the town of Svolvær in Vågan Municipality.

The deanery was created on 1 March 1849 when the old Lofoten og Vesterålen prosti was divided in two, creating Lofoten prosti in the south and Vesterålen prosti in the north.

Municipality	Parish (sokn)	Church	Location	Year built	Photo
Flakstad	Flakstad	Flakstad Church	Ramberg	1780	
Moskenes	Moskenes	Moskenes Church	Moskenes	1819	
Moskenes	Moskenes	Reine Church	Reine	1890	
Vestvågøy	Borge	Borge Church	Bøstad	1986	
Vestvågøy	Borge	Knutstad Chapel	Knutstad	1915	
Vestvågøy	Buksnes	Buksnes Church	Gravdal	1905	
Vestvågøy	Hol	Hol Church	Leknes	1806	
Vestvågøy	Stamsund	Stamsund Church	Stamsund	1937	
Vestvågøy	Valberg	Valberg Church	Valberg	1889	
Vågan	Gimsøy og Strauman	Gimsøy Church	Gimsøysand	1876	
Vågan	Gimsøy og Strauman	Strauman Church	Sydalen	1984	
Vågan	Henningsvær	Henningsvær Church	Henningsvær	1974	
Vågan	Strandlandet	Strandlandet Church	Straumnes	1938	
Vågan	Svolvær	Digermulen Church	Digermulen	1951	
Vågan	Svolvær	Sildpollnes Church	Sildpollneset	1891	
Vågan	Svolvær	Svolvær Church	Svolvær	1934	
Vågan	Vågan	Vågan Church	Kabelvåg	1898	

== Vesterålen prosti ==
This deanery (Norwegian: prosti) covers six municipalities in the Vesterålen island district of Nordland county. It includes the municipalities of Andøy, Bø, Hadsel, Lødingen, Sortland, and Øksnes. The deanery is headquartered in the town of Stokmarknes in Hadsel Municipality.

The deanery was created on 1 March 1849 when the old Lofoten og Vesterålen prosti was divided in two, creating Lofoten prosti in the south and Vesterålen prosti in the north. On 1 January 2020, the churches in Lødingen Municipality were transferred from the Ofoten prosti to the Vesterålen prosti.

Municipality	Parish (sokn)	Church	Location	Year built	Photo
Andøy	Andøy	Andenes Church	Andenes	1876	
Andøy	Andøy	Bjørnskinn Church	Bjørnskinn	1885	
Andøy	Andøy	Dverberg Church	Dverberg	1843	
Andøy	Andøy	Fornes Chapel	Fornes	1965	
Bø	Bø og Malnes	Bø Church	Bø i Vesterålen	1824	
Bø	Bø og Malnes	Betel Chapel	Straume	1926	
Bø	Bø og Malnes	Malnes Church	Eide	1895	
Hadsel	Hadsel	Hadsel Church	Hadsel, just east of Stokmarknes	1824	
Hadsel	Hadsel	Hanøy Church	Hanøyvika	1912	
Hadsel	Hadsel	Innlandet Church	Hennes	1992	
Hadsel	Melbu	Melbu Church	Melbu	1938	
Hadsel	Melbu	Sand Church	Sanden	1914	
Hadsel	Ytre Eidsfjord	Grønning Church	Grønning	1968	
Lødingen	Lødingen	Lødingen Church	Lødingen	1897	
Lødingen	Lødingen	Vestbygd Church	Vågehamn	1885	
Sortland	Sortland	Indre Eidsfjord Church	Holmstad	1970	
Sortland	Sortland	Sigerfjord Church	Sigerfjord	1933	
Sortland	Sortland	Sortland Church	Sortland	1901	
Øksnes	Øksnes	Alsvåg Church	Alsvåg	1923	
Øksnes	Øksnes	Langenes Church	Stø	1500s	
Øksnes	Øksnes	Myre Church	Myre	1979	
Øksnes	Øksnes	Øksnes Church	Skogsøya	1703	

== Ofoten prosti ==
This deanery covers three municipalities in the Ofoten district in the northern part of Nordland county: Narvik, Evenes, and Hamarøy. The deanery is headquartered in the town of Narvik in Narvik Municipality.

This deanery was created as Nordre Salten prosti in 1850 when the old Salten prosti was divided into Nordre Salten prosti (in the north) and Søndre Salten prosti (in the south). On 1 November 1974, the churches in Steigen Municipality were transferred from Nordre Salten prosti to Søndre Salten prosti. On the same date, the names of the deaneries were changed. "Nordre Salten prosti" was renamed Ofoten prosti and "Søndre Salten prosti" was changed to Salten prosti. On 1 January 2020, the churches in Lødingen Municipality were transferred from here to the Vesterålen prosti.

Municipality	Parish (sokn)	Church	Location	Year built	Photo
Evenes	Evenes	Evenes Church	Evenes	1800	
Evenes	Evenes	Bogen Chapel	Bogen	1920	
Hamarøy	Drag/Helland	Drag/Helland Church	Drag	1972	
Hamarøy	Hamarøy	Hamarøy Church	Presteid	1974	
Hamarøy	Korsnes	Korsnes Church	Korsnes	1889	
Hamarøy	Sagfjord	Sagfjord Church	Karlsøy	1770	
Hamarøy	Sagfjord	Tømmernes Church	Tømmerneset	1952	
Narvik	Ankenes	Ankenes Church	Ankenesstranda	1867	
Narvik	Ankenes	Håkvik Chapel	Håkvik	1980	
Narvik	Ballangen	Ballangen Church	Ballangen	1923	
Narvik	Ballangen	Efjord Chapel	Kobbvika	1985	
Narvik	Ballangen	Kjeldebotn Church	Kjeldebotn	1956	
Narvik	Bjerkvik	Bjerkvik Church	Bjerkvik	1955	
Narvik	Bjerkvik	Bjørnfjell Chapel	Bjørnfjell	1952	
Narvik	Kjøpsvik	Kjøpsvik Church	Kjøpsvik	1975	
Narvik	Narvik	Narvik Church	Narvik	1925	
Narvik	Narvik	Fredskapellet	Narvik	1957	
Narvik	Narvik	Hergot Chapel	Hergot	2005	
Narvik	Skjomen	Skjomen Church	Elvegården	1893	

== Salten prosti ==
This deanery (Norwegian: prosti) covers five municipalities in the Salten district of Nordland county. It includes the municipalities of Beiarn, Fauske, Saltdal, Steigen, and Sørfold. The deanery is headquartered in the town of Fauske in Fauske Municipality.

The deanery was created in 1649 and existed as such until 1849. In 1850, the deanery was divided into two: Søndre Salten prosti in the south (Gildeskål, Skjerstad, Saltdal, Bodø, and Folda prestegjelds) and Nordre Salten prosti in the north (Steigen, Hamarøy, Lødingen, and Ofoten prestegjelds). In 1901, Søndre Salten prosti was split into Bodø prosti (Bodø, Bodin, Kjerringøy, and Folda) and Søndre Salten prosti (Gildeskål, Beiarn, Skjerstad, and Saltdal). On 1 November 1974, the churches in Steigen Municipality were transferred from Nordre Salten prosti to Søndre Salten prosti. On the same date, the names of the deaneries were changed. Nordre Salten prosti was renamed Ofoten prosti and Søndre Salten prosti was changed to Salten prosti.

Municipality	Parish (sokn)	Church	Location	Year built	Photo
Beiarn	Beiarn	Beiarn Church	Moldjord	1873	
Beiarn	Beiarn	Høyforsmoen Chapel	Høyforsmoen	1957	
Fauske	Fauske	Fauske Church	Fauske	1867	
Fauske	Sulitjelma	Sulitjelma Church	Sulitjelma	1899	
Fauske	Sulitjelma	Sulitjelma Chapel	Sulitjelma	1996	
Fauske	Valnesfjord	Valnesfjord Church	Valnesfjord	1905	
Saltdal	Saltdal	Saltdal Church	Rognan	1862	
Saltdal	Øvre Saltdal	Øvre Saltdal Church	Røkland	1938	
Steigen	Leiranger	Leiranger Church	Leines	1911	
Steigen	Leiranger	Leinesfjord Chapel	Leinesfjorden	1912	
Steigen	Leiranger	Sørskot Chapel	Sørskot	1953	
Steigen	Nordfold	Nordfold Church	Nordfold	1976	
Steigen	Steigen	Steigen Church	Steigen, near Solheim	1250	
Steigen	Steigen	Bogen Chapel	Bogen	1926	
Sørfold	Sørfold	Rørstad Church	Rørstad	1761	
Sørfold	Sørfold	Røsvik Church	Røsvika	1883	
Sørfold	Sørfold	Mørsvikbotn Chapel	Mørsvikbotn	1955	

== Nord-Helgeland prosti ==
This deanery (Norwegian: prosti) covers eight municipalities in the northwestern part of the Helgeland district of Nordland county. It includes the parishes in the municipalities of Alstahaug, Dønna, Herøy, Leirfjord, Lurøy, Nesna, Rødøy, and Træna. The deanery is headquartered in the town of Sandnessjøen in Alstahaug Municipality.

The deanery was established by royal decree of 4 December 1843, when the old Helgeland prosti was divided into Søndre Helgeland prosti and Nordre Helgeland prosti. A royal resolution on 24 May 1862 decreed that the four inland parishes of Nordre Helgeland prosti (Hemnes, Mo, Vefsn, and Hattfjelldal) were separated from this deanery to become part of the newly created Indre Helgeland prosti. A royal resolution on 19 May 1922 changed the deanery name from "Nordre Helgeland prosti" to "Nord-Helgeland prosti".

Municipality	Parish (sokn)	Church	Location	Year built	Photo
Alstahaug	Alstahaug	Alstahaug Church	Alstahaug	12th century	
Alstahaug	Sandnessjøen	Sandnessjøen Church	Sandnessjøen	1882	
Alstahaug	Tjøtta	Skålvær Church	Skålvær	1851	
Alstahaug	Tjøtta	Tjøtta Church	Tjøtta	1867	
Dønna	Dønna	Dønnes Church	Dønnes	1200	
Dønna	Dønna	Hæstad Church	Hestad	1912	
Dønna	Dønna	Løkta Church	Løkta	1968	
Dønna	Dønna	Nordvik Church	Nordvik, north of Solfjellsjøen	1877	
Dønna	Dønna	Vandve Church	Vandve	1956	
Herøy	Herøy	Herøy Church	Silvalen	12th century	
Herøy	Herøy	Gåsvær Chapel	Gåsvær	1951	
Herøy	Herøy	Husvær Chapel	Husvær	1936	
Herøy	Herøy	Sandvær Chapel	Sandværet	1947	
Leirfjord	Leirfjord	Bardal Church	Bardal Indre	1887	
Leirfjord	Leirfjord	Leirfjord Church	Leland	1867	
Lurøy	Aldersund	Aldersund Church	Haugland	1971	
Lurøy	Lurøy	Lovund Church	Lovund	1960	
Lurøy	Lurøy	Lurøy Church	Lurøy	1812	
Lurøy	Lurøy	Moflag Church	Moflaget	1921	
Nesna	Nesna	Nesna Church	Nesna	1880	
Nesna	Nesna	Handnesøya Chapel	Saura	1969	
Nesna	Nesna	Husby Chapel	Husby	1905	
Rødøy	Rødøy	Rødøy Church	Rødøya	1885	
Rødøy	Rødøy	Sørfjorden Church	Sørfjorden	1916	
Rødøy	Rødøy	Tjongsfjorden Church	Tjong	1962	
Træna	Træna	Træna Church	Husøya	1773	
Træna	Træna	Fiskernes Chapel	Selvær	1887	

== Indre Helgeland prosti ==
This deanery (Norwegian: prosti) covers five municipalities in the eastern part of the Helgeland district of Nordland county. It includes the parishes in the municipalities of Grane, Hattfjelldal, Hemnes, Rana, and Vefsn. The deanery is headquartered in the town of Mo i Rana in Rana Municipality.

The deanery was established by royal decree on 24 May 1862 when the four inland parishes of Nordre Helgeland prosti (Hemnes, Mo, Vefsn, and Hattfjelldal) were separated from the deanery to become part of the newly created Indre Helgeland prosti.

Municipality	Parish (sokn)	Church	Location	Year built	Photo
Grane	Grane	Fiplingdal Church	Leiren	1946	
Grane	Grane	Grane Church	Grane	1860	
Grane	Grane	Majavatn Church	Majavatn	1915	
Hattfjelldal	Hattfjelldal	Hattfjelldal Church	Hattfjelldal	1790	
Hattfjelldal	Hattfjelldal	Susendal Church	Svenskvollen	1916	
Hattfjelldal	Hattfjelldal	Varntresk Church	Varntresk	1986	
Hemnes	Bleikvassli	Bleikvassli Church	Bleikvasslia	1955	
Hemnes	Hemnes	Hemnes Church	Hemnesberget	1872	
Hemnes	Korgen	Korgen Church	Korgen	1863	
Rana	Gruben	Gruben Church	Mo i Rana	1965	
Rana	Mo	Mo Church	Mo i Rana	1724	
Rana	Nevernes	Nevernes Church	Nevernes	1893	
Rana	Nord Rana	Selfors Church	Selfors	1973	
Rana	Nord Rana	Ytteren Church	Ytteren	1977	
Rana	Røssvoll	Røssvoll Church	Røssvoll	1953	
Rana	Sjona	Sjona Church	Myklebustad	1916	
Vefsn	Dolstad	Dolstad Church	Mosjøen	1735	
Vefsn	Drevja	Drevja Church	Nilsskogen	1883	
Vefsn	Elsfjord	Elsfjord Church	Elsfjord	1955	

== Sør-Helgeland prosti ==
This deanery (Norwegian: prosti) covers five municipalities in the southwestern part of the Helgeland district of Nordland county. It includes the parishes in the municipalities of Bindal, Brønnøy, Sømna, Vega, and Vevelstad. The deanery is headquartered at Brønnøy Church in the town of Brønnøysund in Brønnøy Municipality.

The deanery was established by royal decree of 4 December 1843, when the old Helgeland prosti was divided into Søndre Helgeland prosti and Nordre Helgeland prosti. A royal resolution on 19 May 1922 changed the deanery name from "Søndre Helgeland prosti" to "Sør-Helgeland prosti".

Municipality	Parish (sokn)	Church	Location	Year built	Photo
Bindal	Bindal	Solstad Church	Holm	1888	
Bindal	Bindal	Vassås Church	Vassås	1733	
Brønnøy	Brønnøy	Brønnøy Church	Brønnøysund	1870	
Brønnøy	Brønnøy	Skogmo Chapel	Indreskomo	1979	
Brønnøy	Brønnøy	Trælnes Chapel	Trælnes	1980	
Brønnøy	Velfjord og Tosen	Nøstvik Church	Hommelstø	1674	
Brønnøy	Velfjord og Tosen	Tosen Chapel	Lande	1734	
Sømna	Sømna	Sømna Church	Vik	1876	
Vega	Vega	Vega Church	Gladstad	1864	
Vega	Vega	Ylvingen Chapel	Ylvingen	1967	
Vevelstad	Vevelstad	Vevelstad Church	Forvika	1796	
