= Narvik Church =

Church in Nordland, Norway

- Narvik kirke
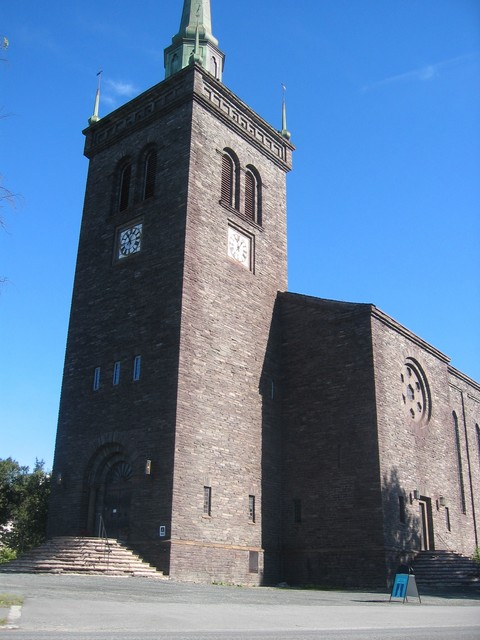
- View of the church
- Narvik Church
- 68.43934833°N 17.41348296°E
- Location: Narvik Municipality, Nordland
- Country: Norway
- Denomination: Church of Norway
- Churchmanship: Evangelical Lutheran

History
- Status: Parish church
- Founded: 1925
- Consecrated: 16 December 1925

Architecture
- Functional status: Active
- Architect: Olaf Nordhagen
- Architectural type: Long church
- Completed: 1925 (101 years ago)

Specifications
- Capacity: 700
- Materials: Stone

Administration
- Diocese: Sør-Hålogaland
- Deanery: Ofoten prosti
- Parish: Narvik
- Norwegian Cultural Heritage Site
- Type: Church
- Status: Automatically protected
- ID: 85094

Narvik Church (Norwegian: Narvik kirke) is a parish church of the Church of Norway in Narvik Municipality in Nordland county, Norway. It is located in the town of Narvik. It is the main church for the Narvik parish as well as the seat of the Ofoten prosti (deanery) in the Diocese of Sør-Hålogaland. The large, stone church was built in a long church style in 1925 using plans drawn up by the architect Olaf Nordhagen. The church seats about 700 people.

== Media gallery ==
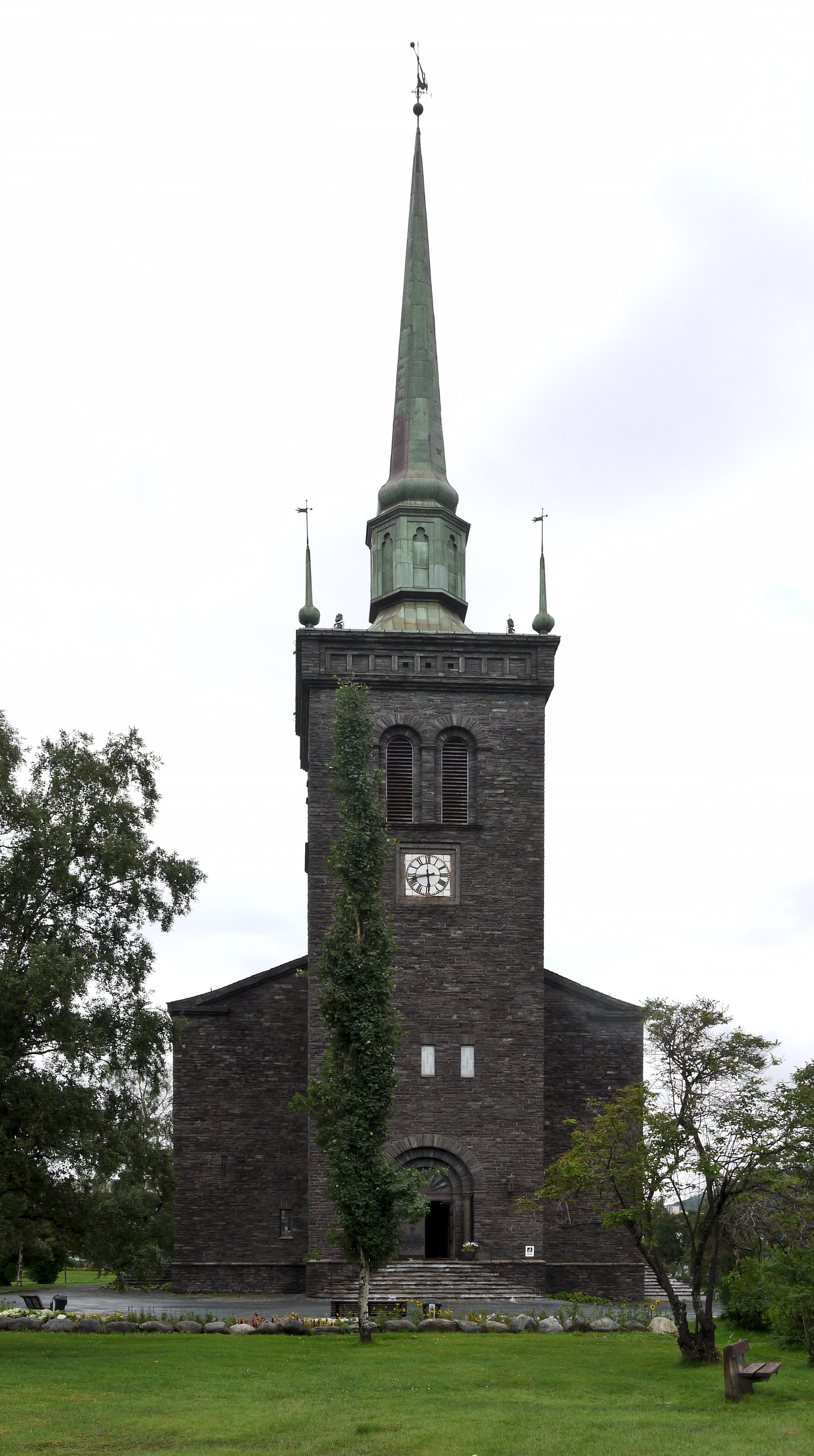

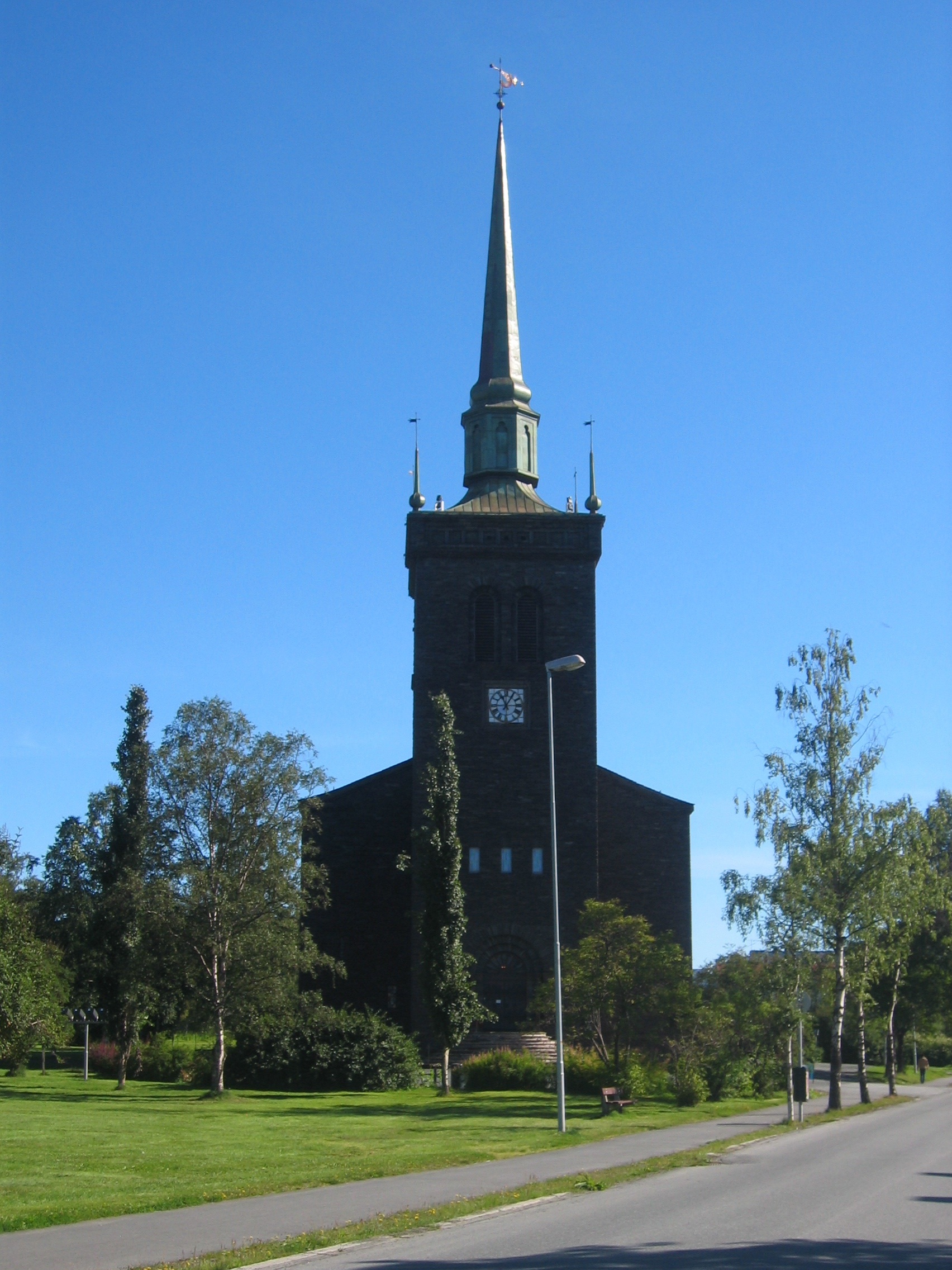

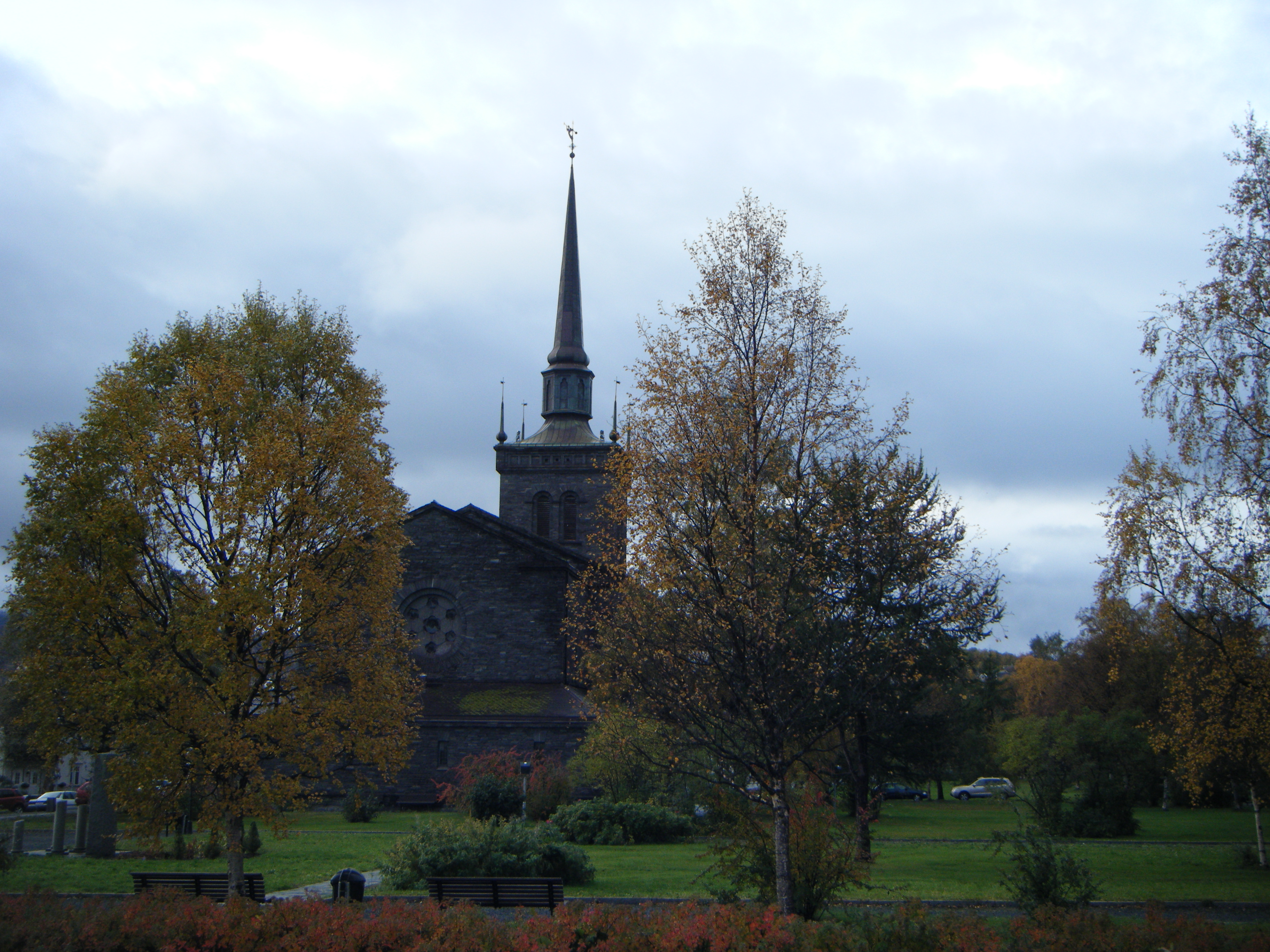

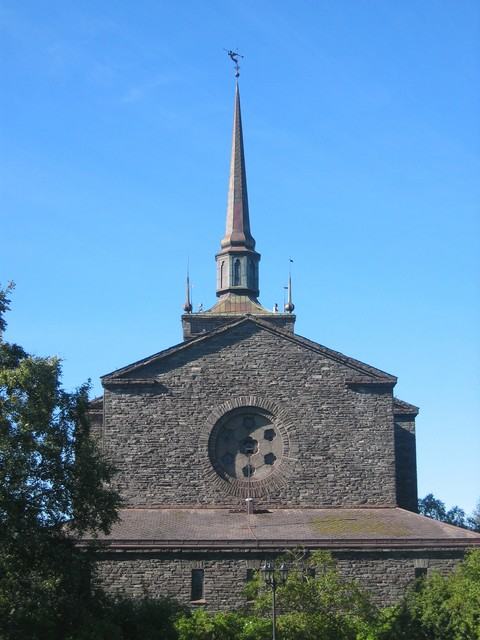

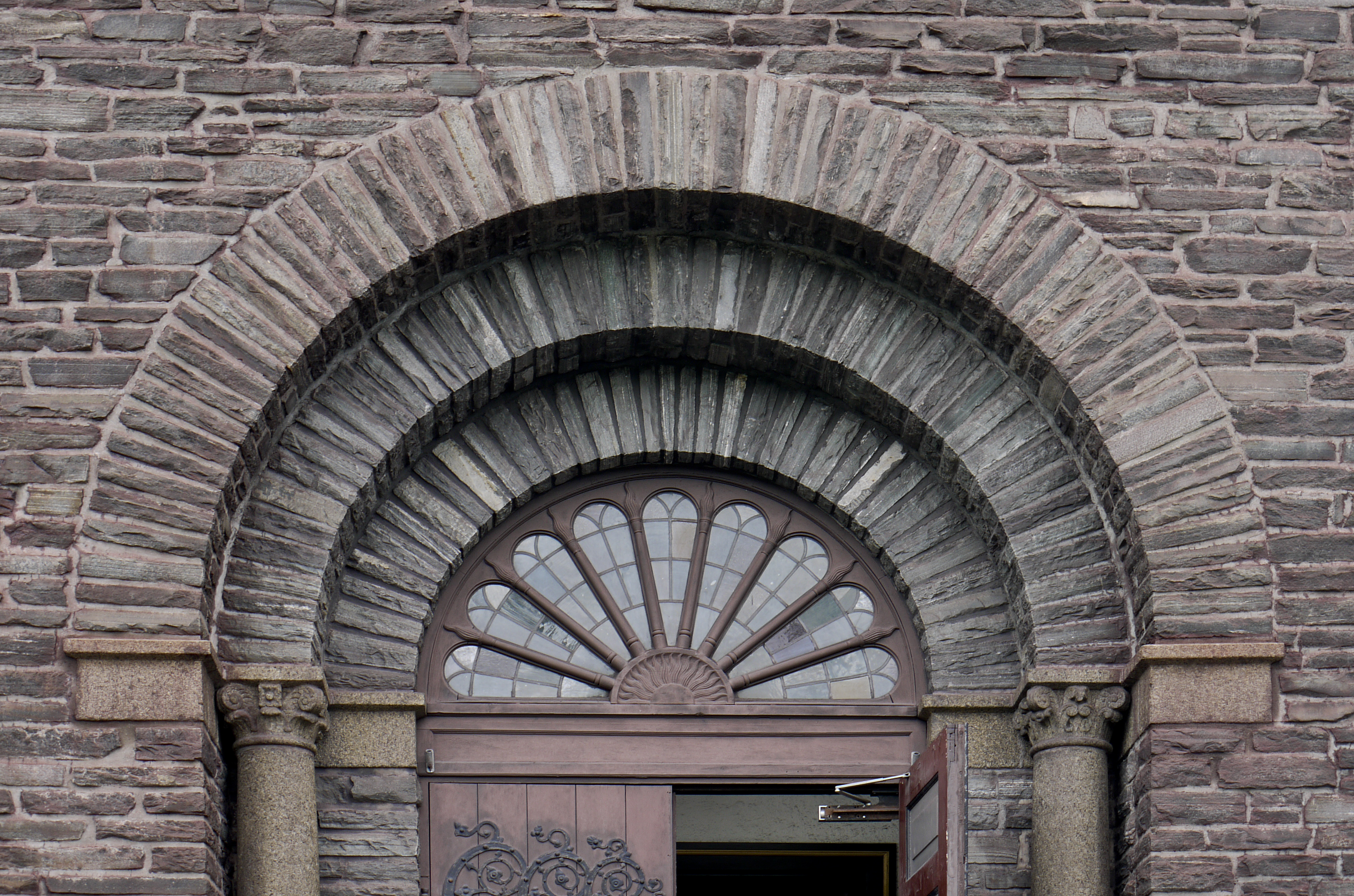

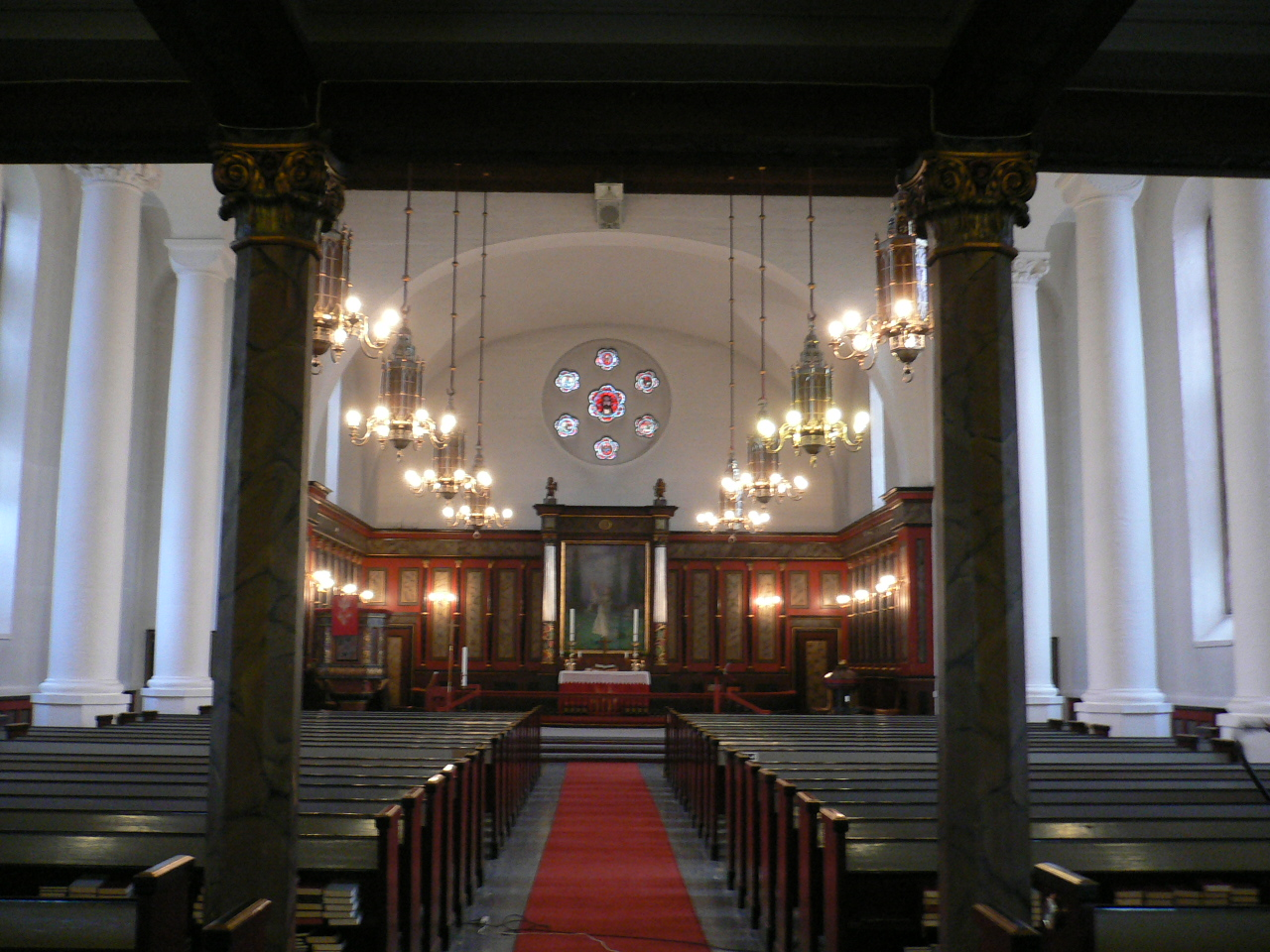

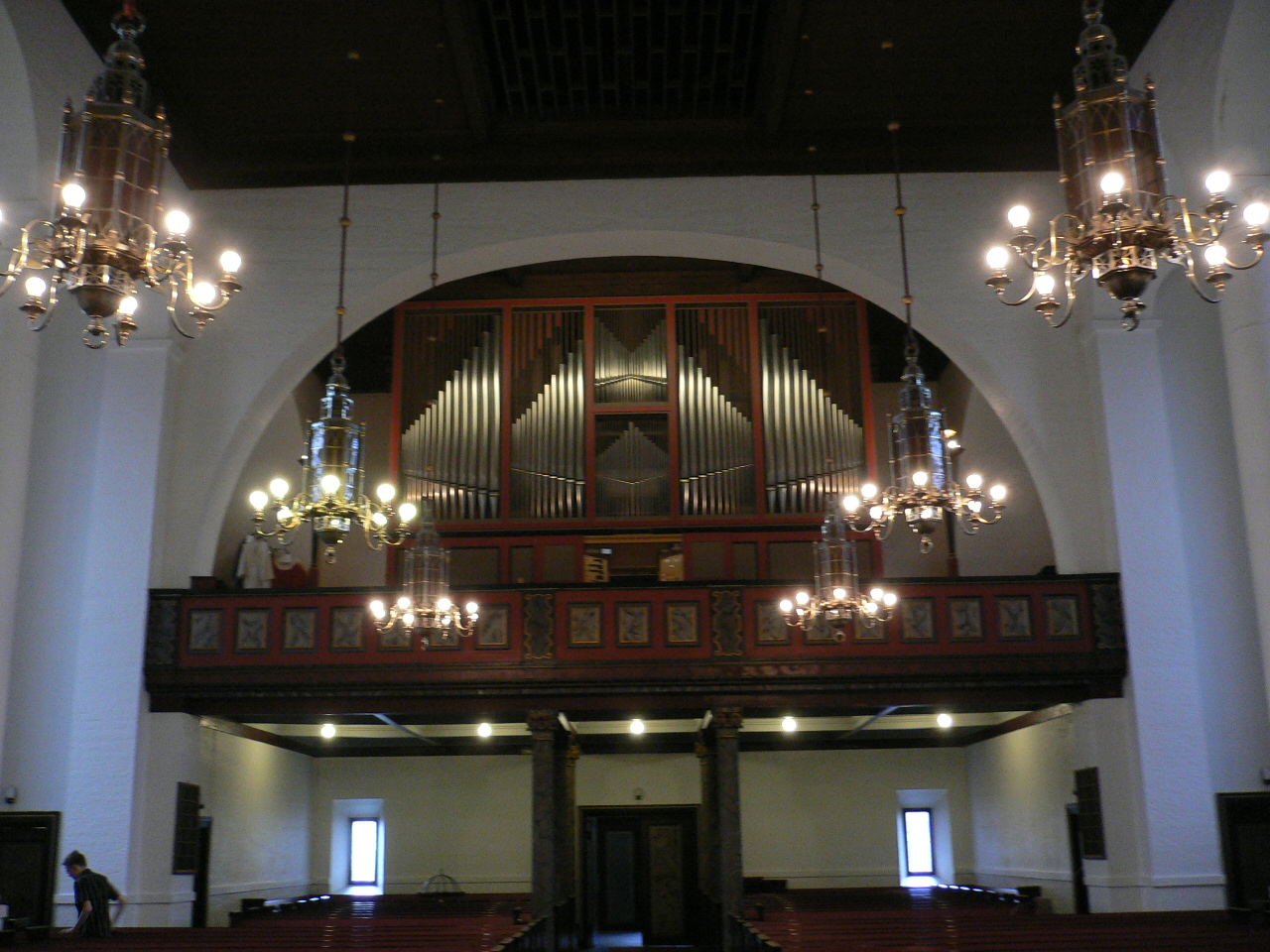

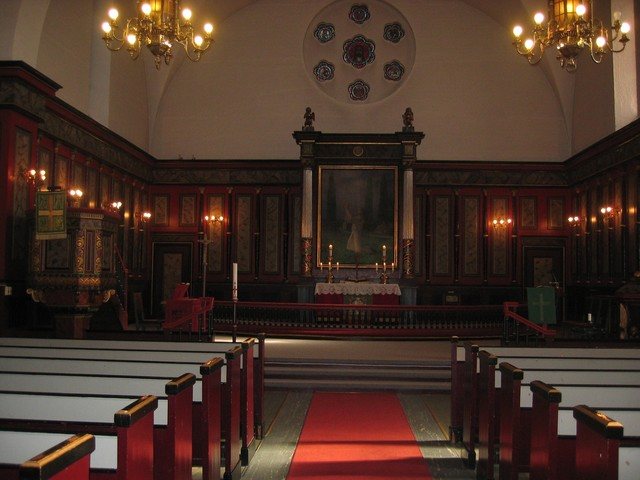

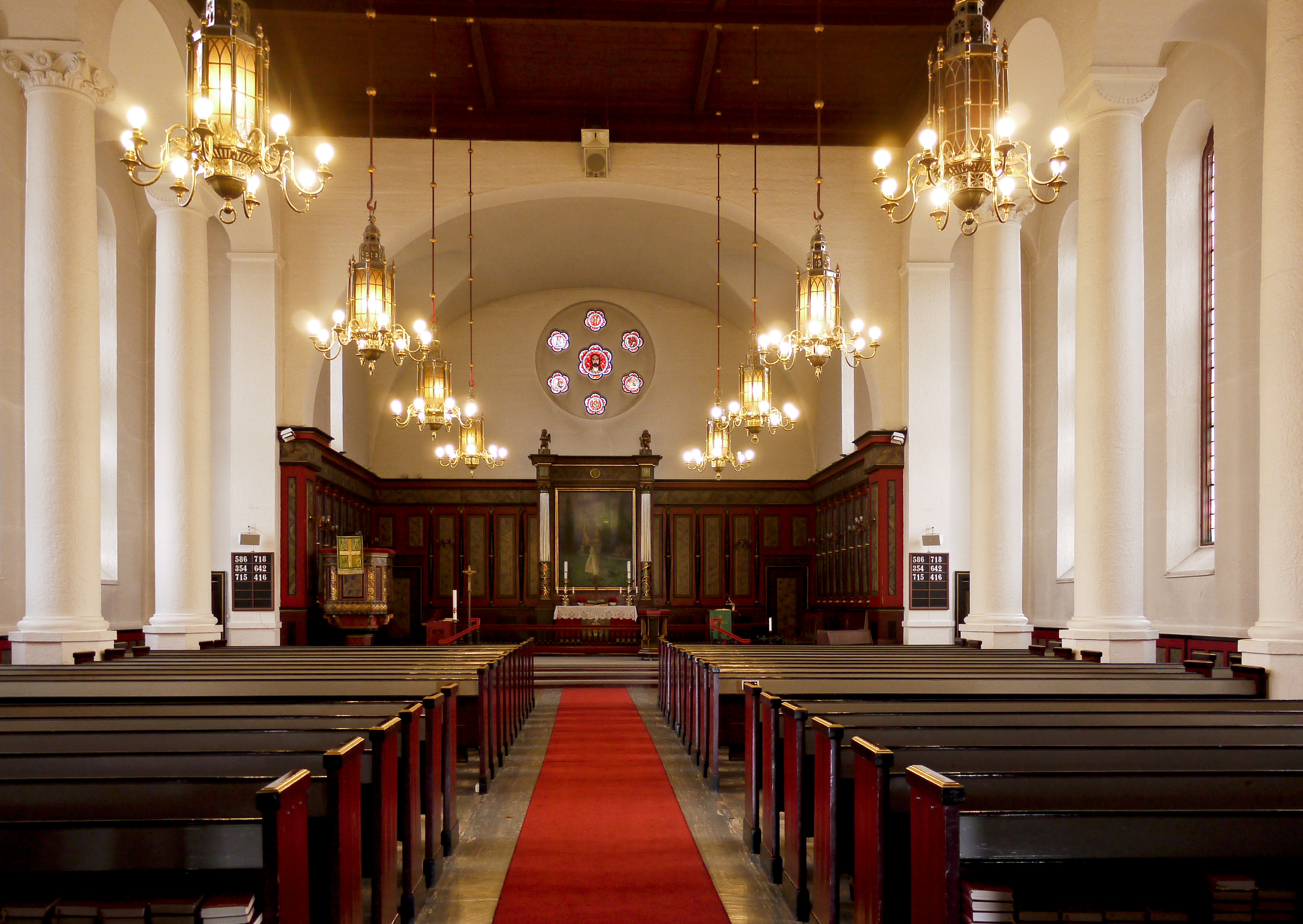

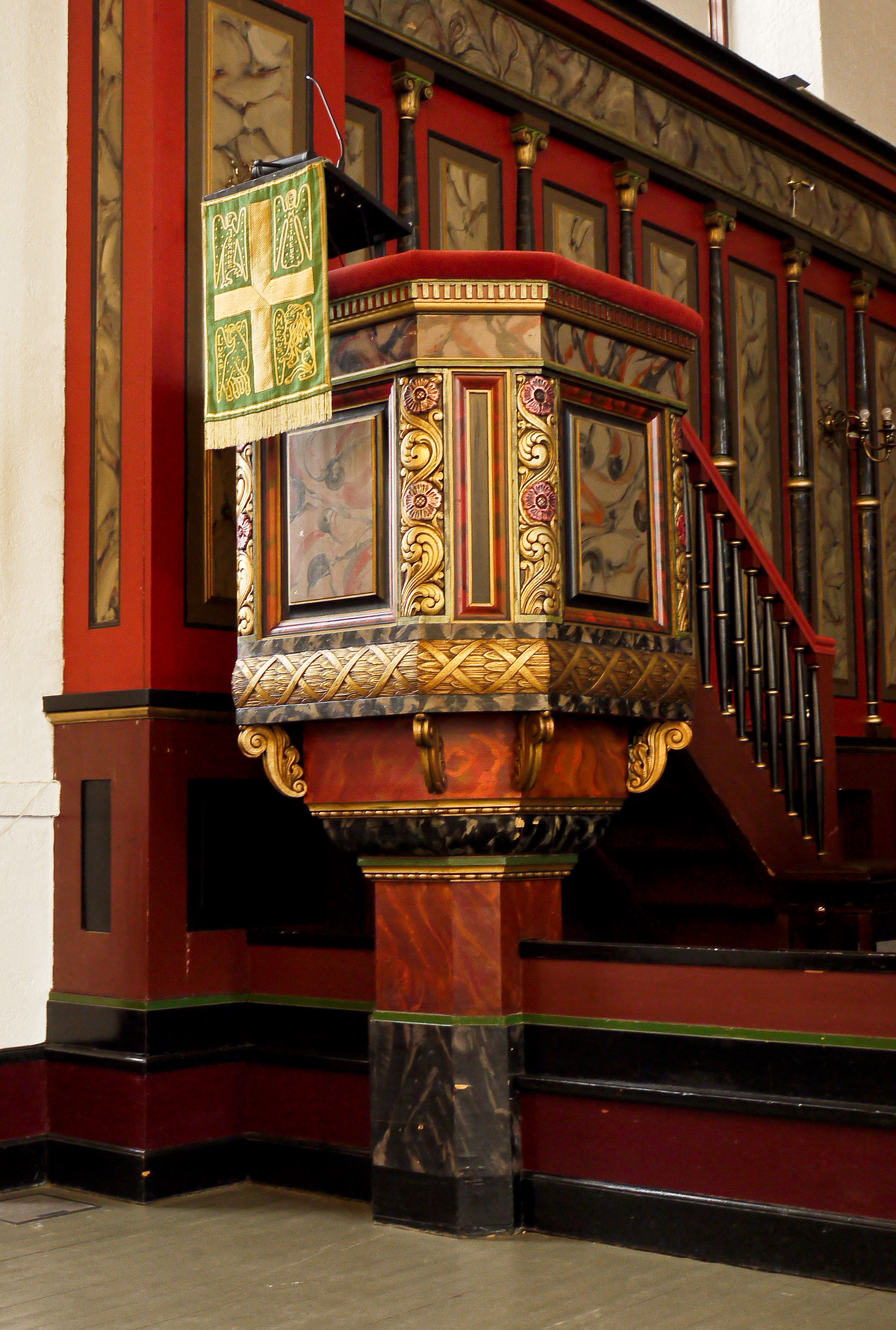

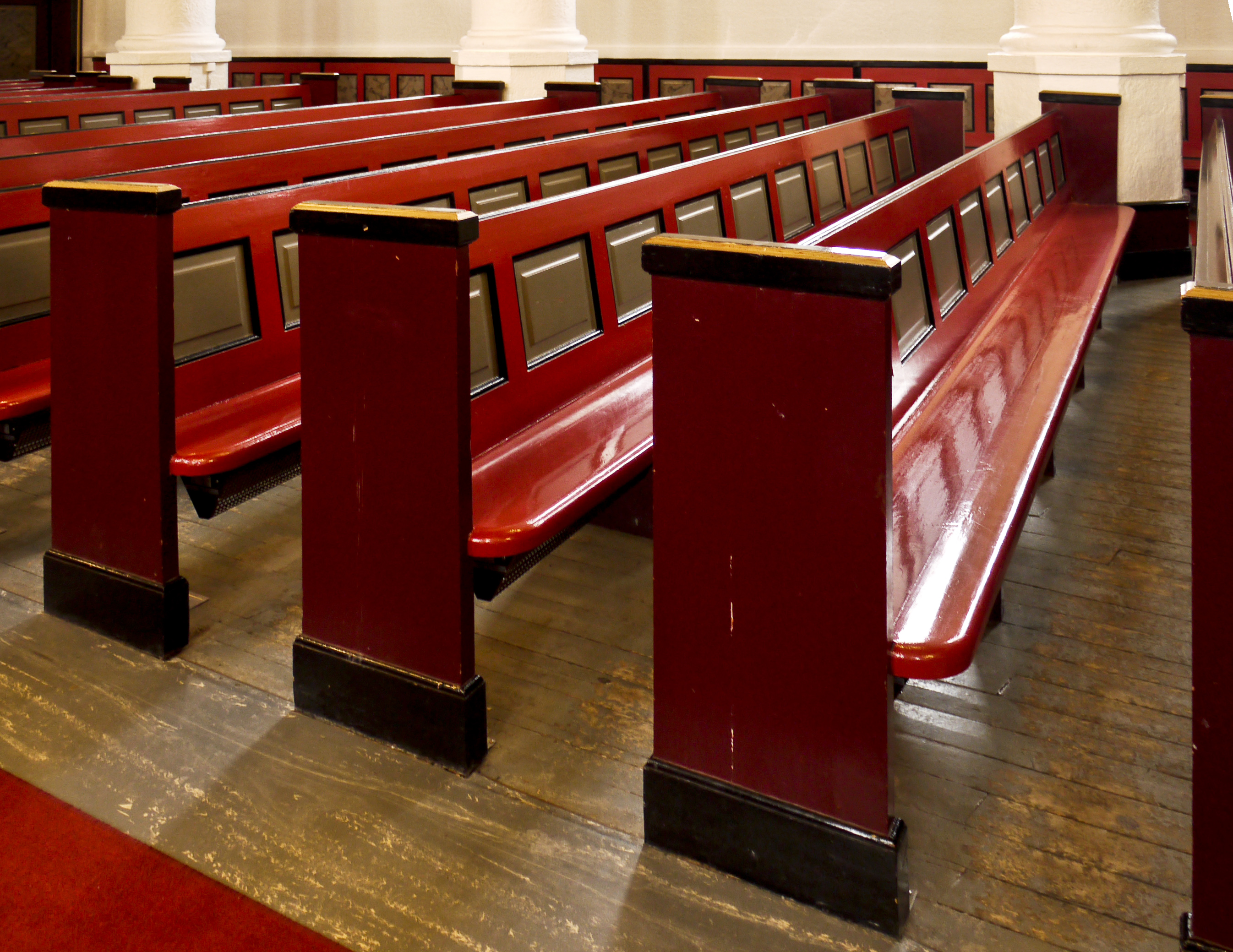

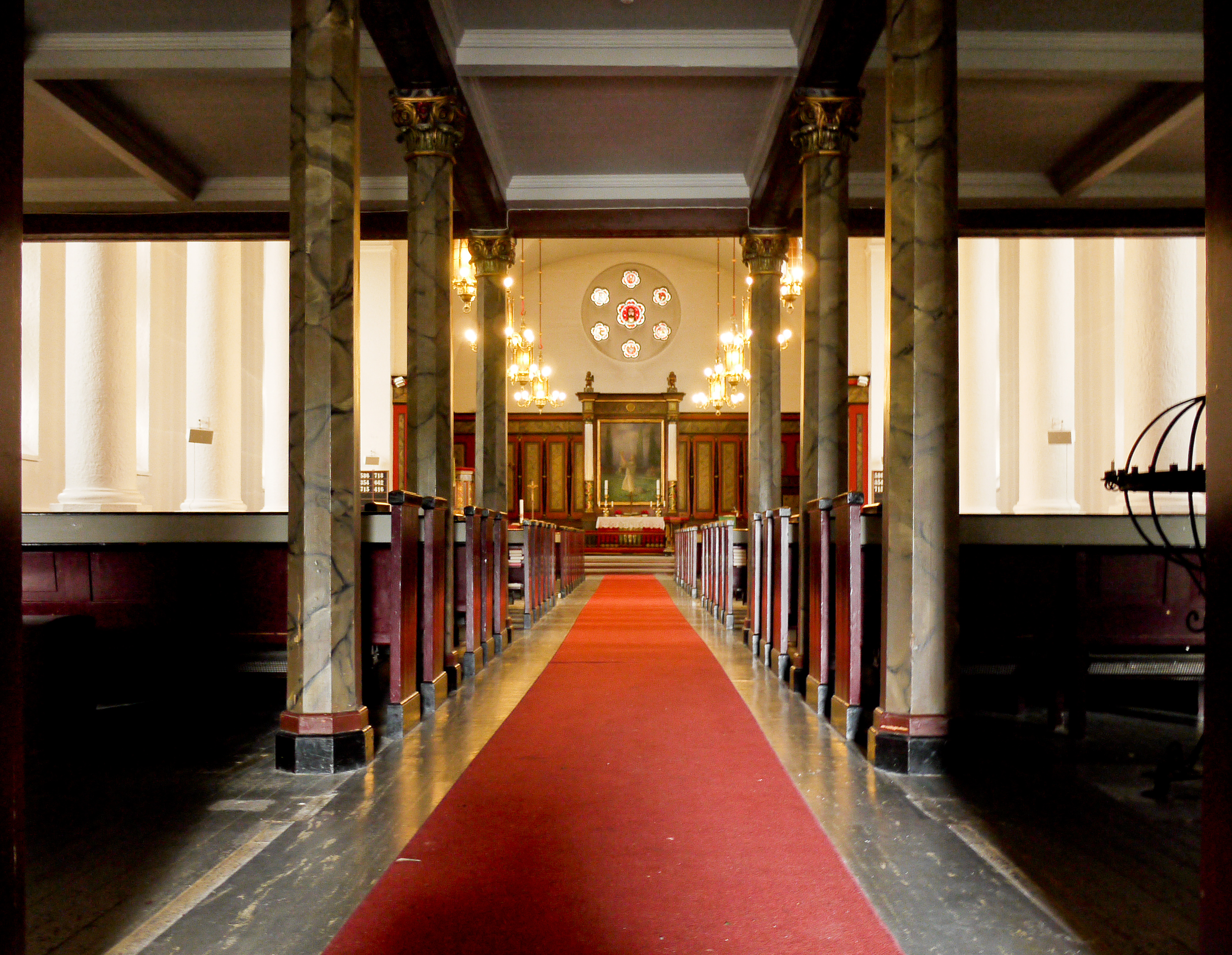

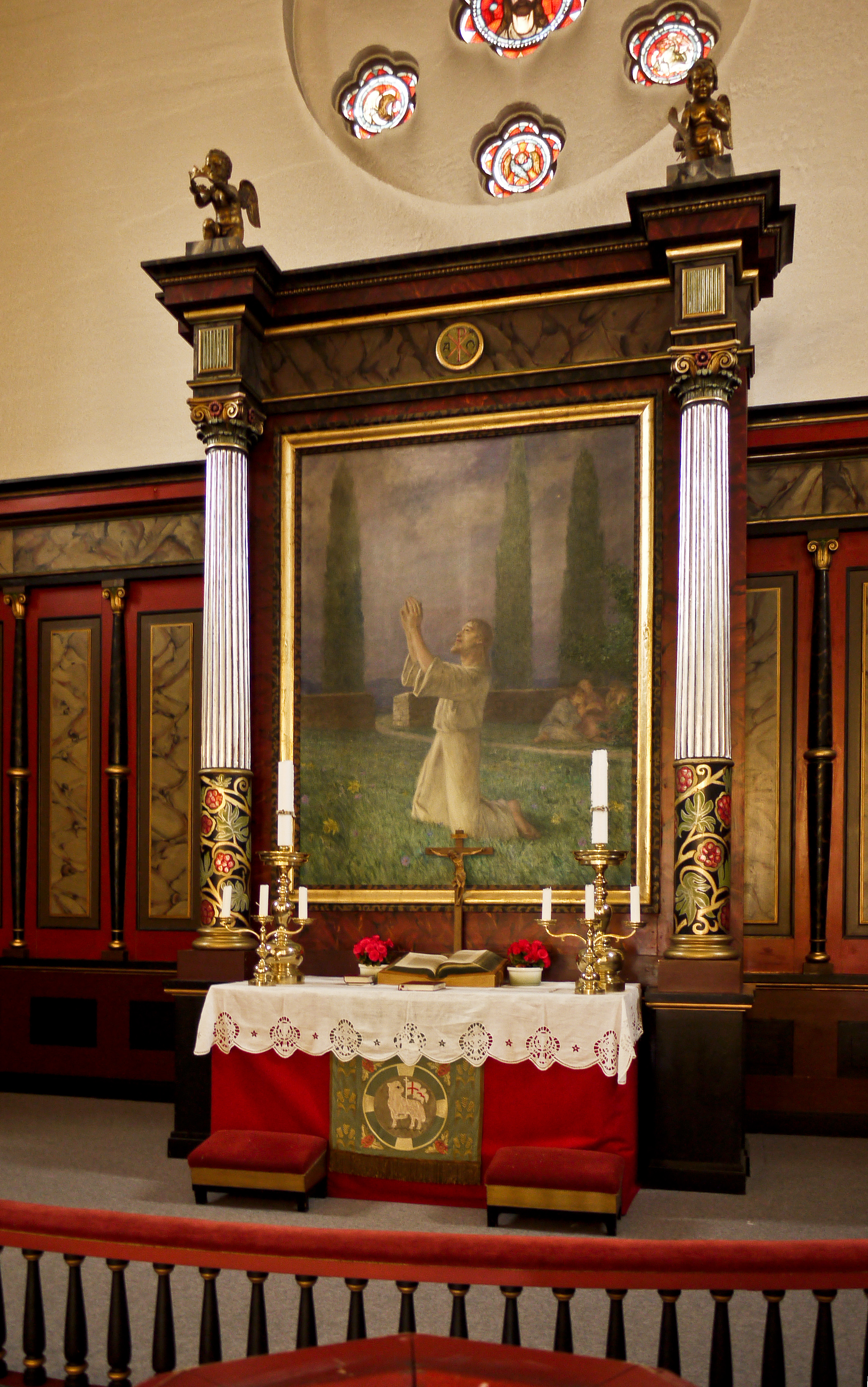

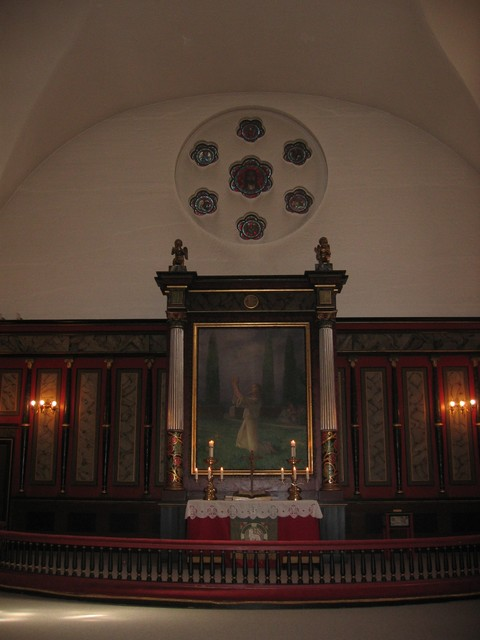

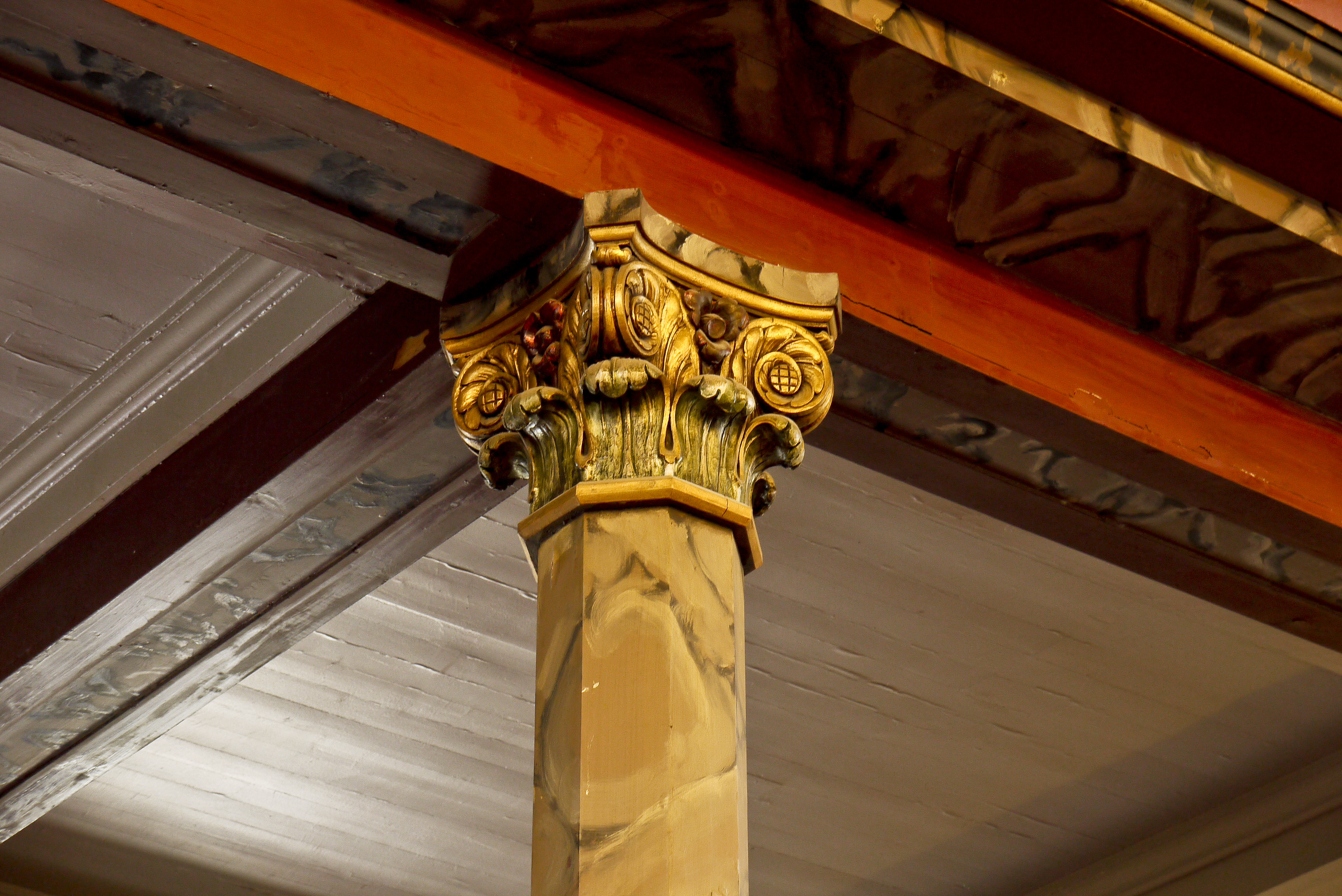

== See also ==
- List of churches in Sør-Hålogaland
