= Hunstad Church =

Church in Nordland, Norway

- Hunstad kirke
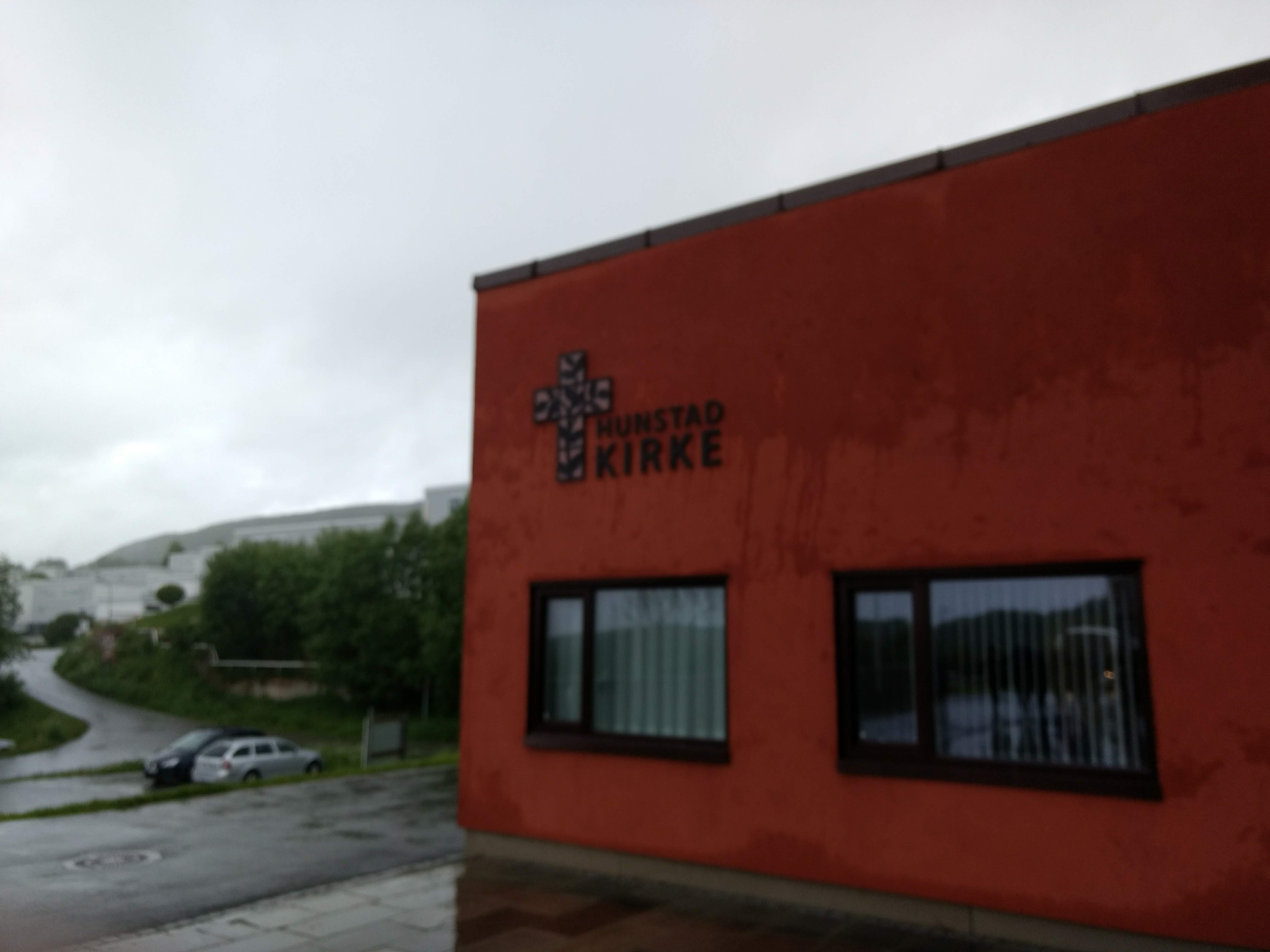
- View of the church
- Hunstad Church
- 67.2823701°N 14.5418209°E
- Location: Bodø Municipality, Nordland
- Country: Norway
- Denomination: Church of Norway
- Churchmanship: Evangelical Lutheran

History
- Status: Parish church
- Founded: 2013
- Consecrated: 2013

Architecture
- Functional status: Active
- Architect: Johnny Kristensen
- Architectural type: Rectangular
- Completed: 2013 (13 years ago)

Specifications
- Capacity: 400
- Materials: Concrete

Administration
- Diocese: Sør-Hålogaland
- Deanery: Bodø domprosti
- Parish: Innstranden

Hunstad Church (Norwegian: Hunstad kirke) is a parish church of the Church of Norway in Bodø Municipality in Nordland county, Norway. It is located in the town of Bodø. It is the church for the Innstranden parish which is part of the Bodø domprosti (deanery) in the Diocese of Sør-Hålogaland. The white, concrete church was built in a rectangular style in 2013 by the architect Johnny Kristensen from the company U2 Arkitekter. The church seats about 400 people.

The church is rather unique in Norway because it is a part of a large building complex which includes a school, library, cafe, and leisure centre. The church cost about 84 million kr.

== Media gallery ==
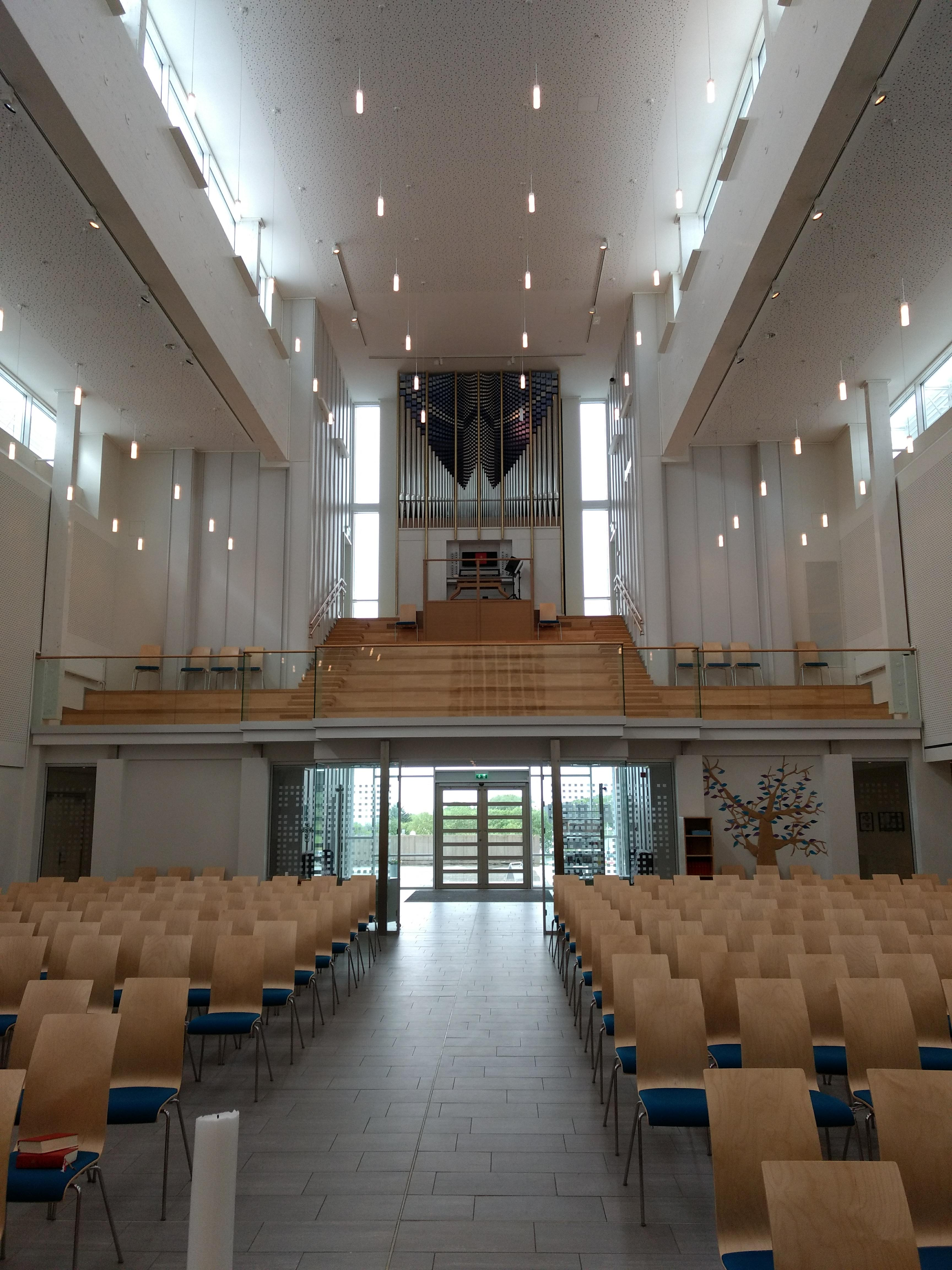

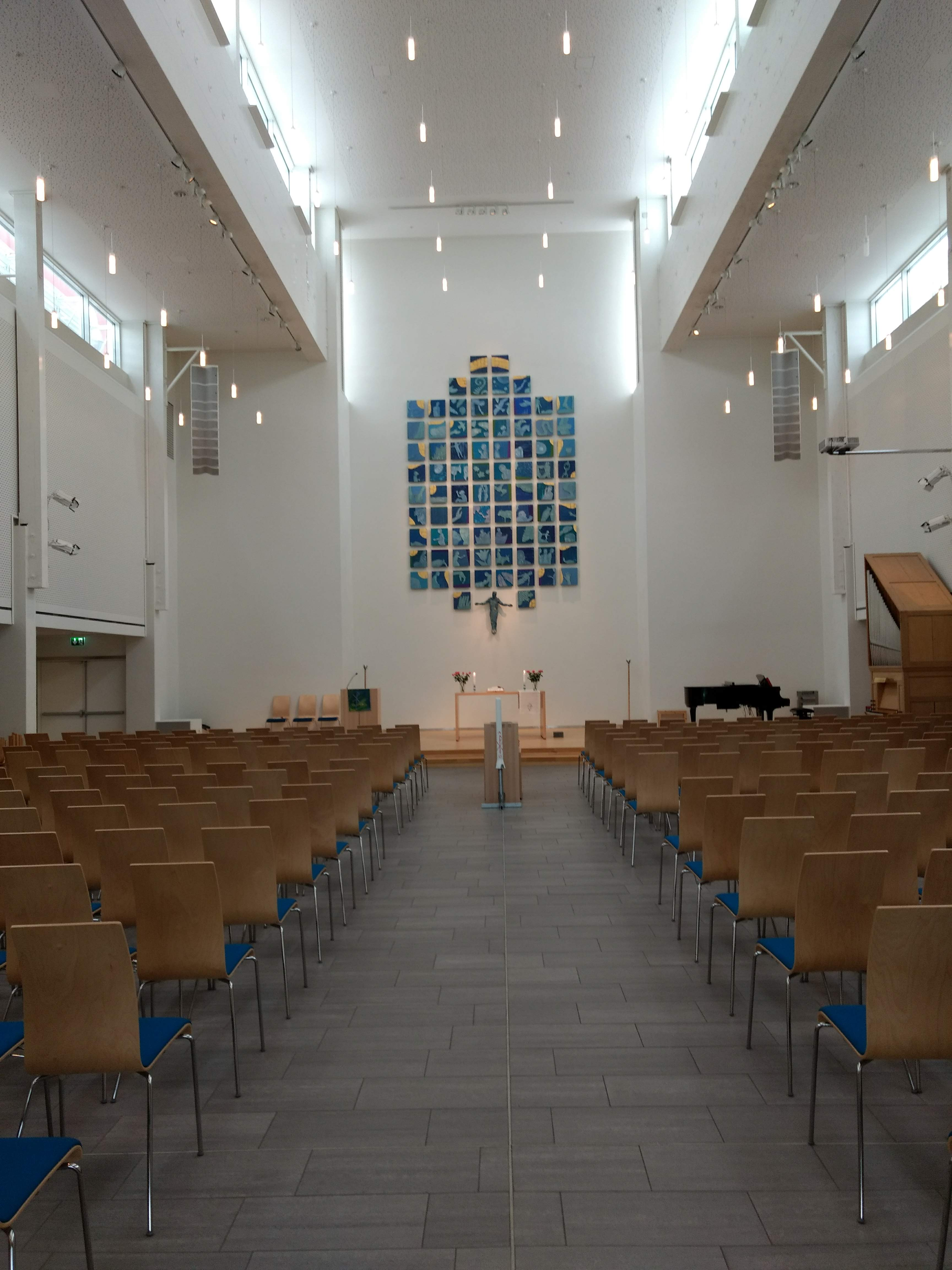

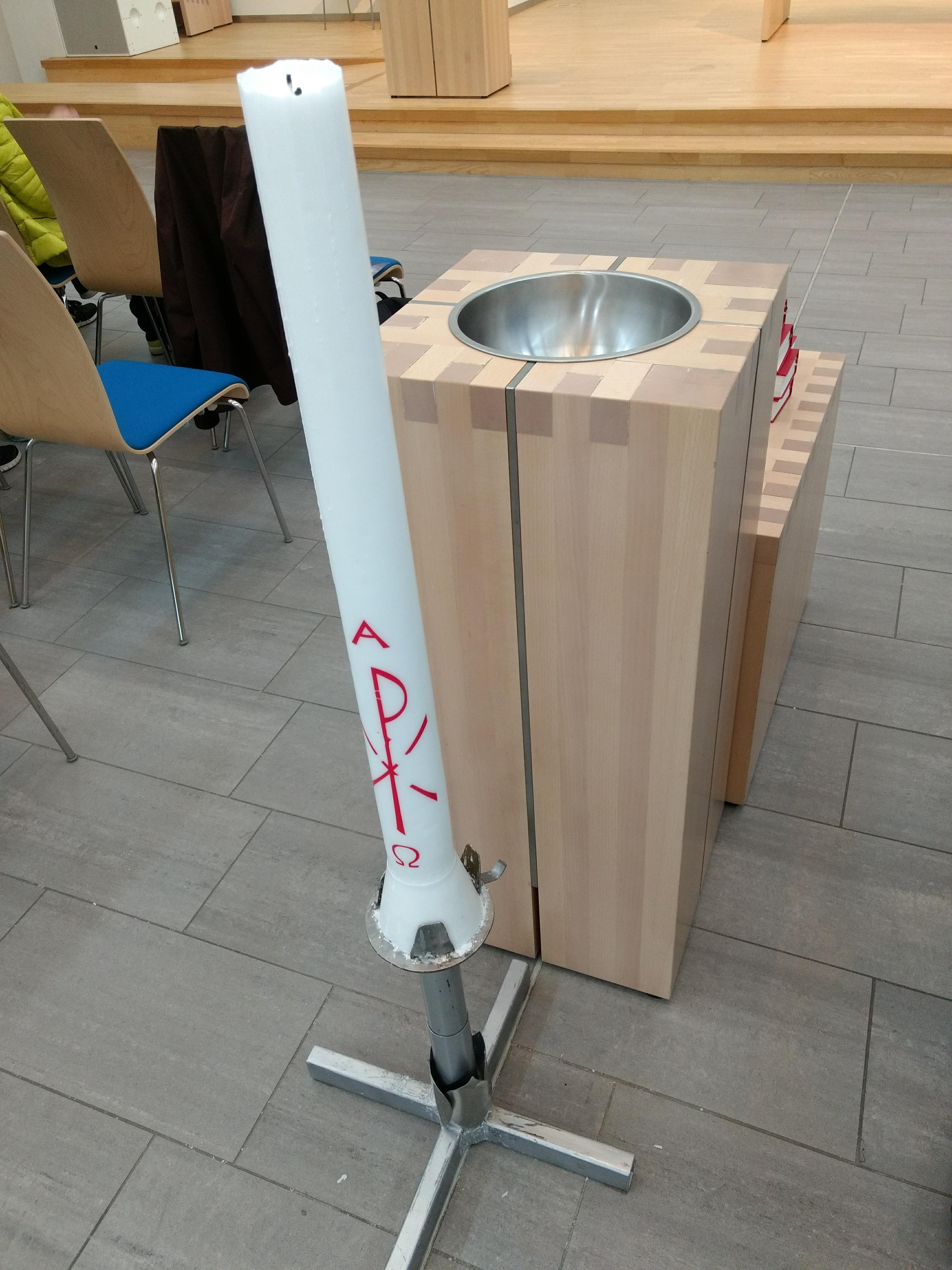

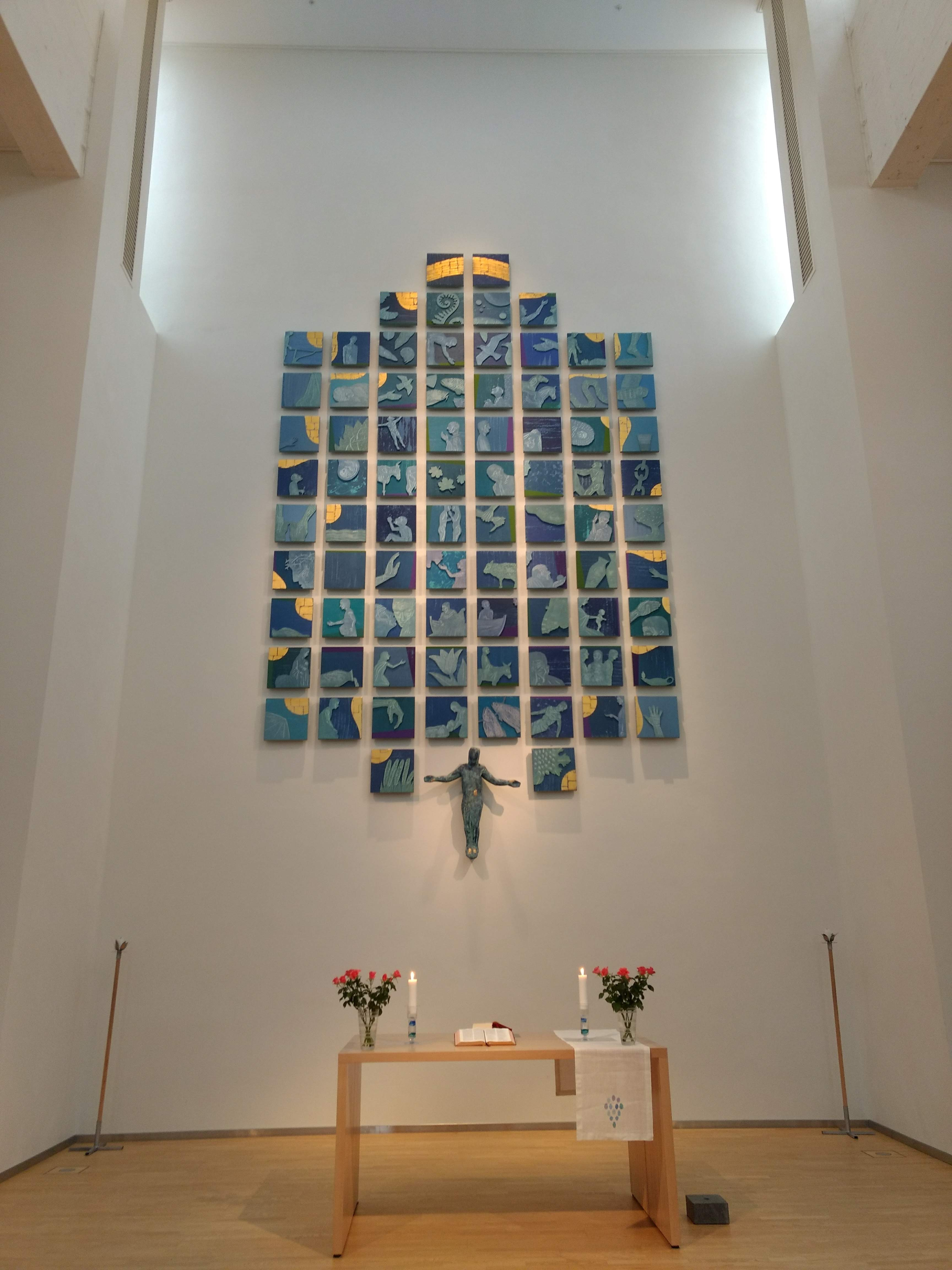

== See also ==
- List of churches in Sør-Hålogaland
