= Myre Church =

- Myre kirke
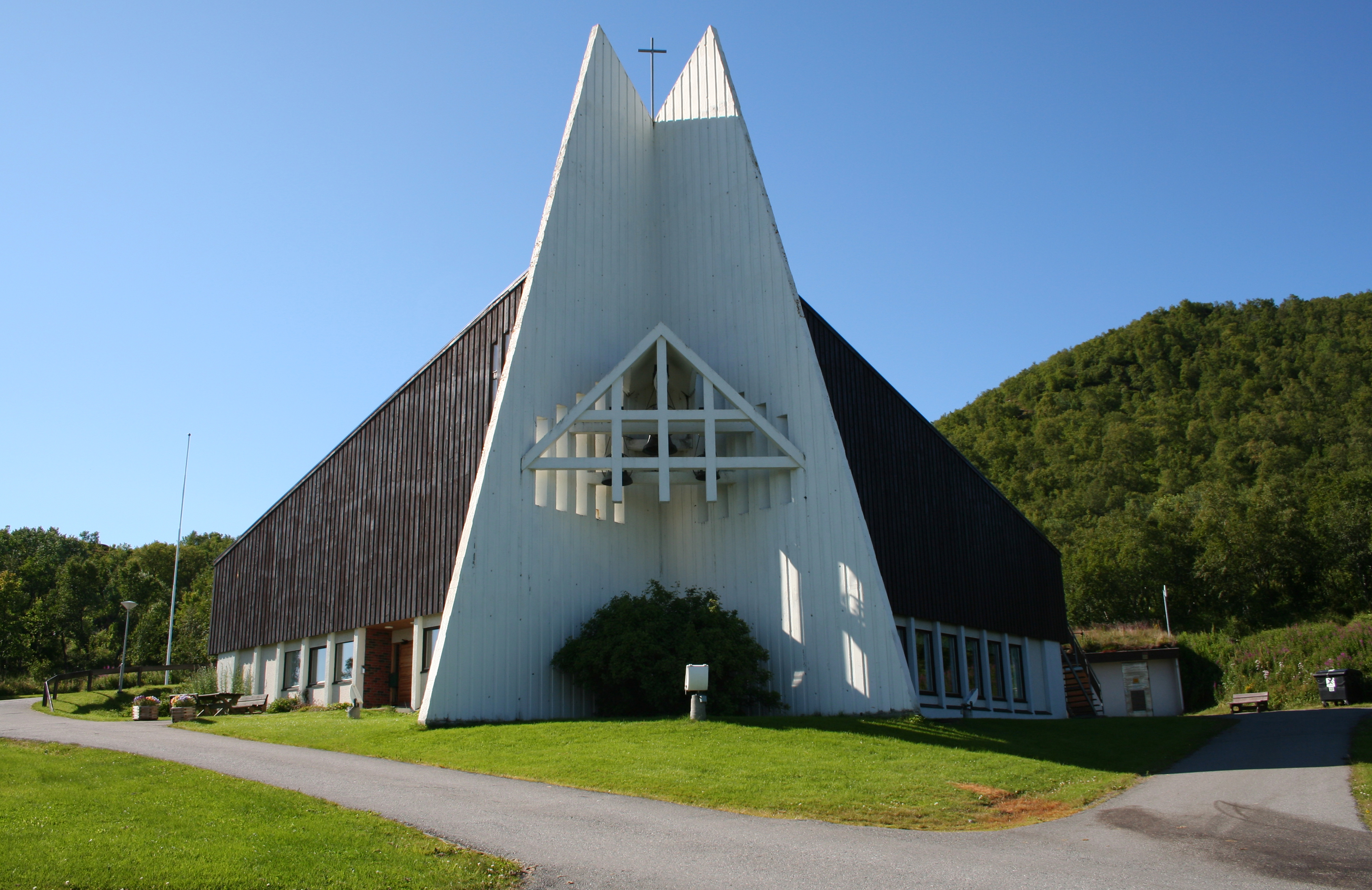
- View of the church
- Myre Church
- 68.9183056°N 15.0813585°E
- Location: Øksnes Municipality, Nordland
- Country: Norway
- Denomination: Church of Norway
- Churchmanship: Evangelical Lutheran

History
- Status: Parish church
- Founded: 1979
- Consecrated: 1979

Architecture
- Functional status: Active
- Architect: Arne Aursand
- Architectural type: Fan-shaped
- Completed: 1979 (47 years ago)

Specifications
- Capacity: 300
- Materials: Wood

Administration
- Diocese: Sør-Hålogaland
- Deanery: Vesterålen prosti
- Parish: Øksnes
- Norwegian Cultural Heritage Site
- Type: Church
- Status: Not protected
- ID: 85810

Myre Church (Norwegian: Myre kirke) is a parish church of the Church of Norway in Øksnes Municipality in Nordland county, Norway. It is located in the village of Myre in the northern part of the island of Langøya. It is one of the churches for the Øksnes parish which is part of the Vesterålen prosti (deanery) in the Diocese of Sør-Hålogaland. The white, concrete church was built in a fan-shaped style in 1979 using plans drawn up by the architect Arne Aursand. The church seats about 300 people.

== See also ==
- List of churches in Sør-Hålogaland
