= Nordvik Municipality =

Former municipality in Nordland, Norway

Nordvik Municipality Nordvik herred
- Former municipality
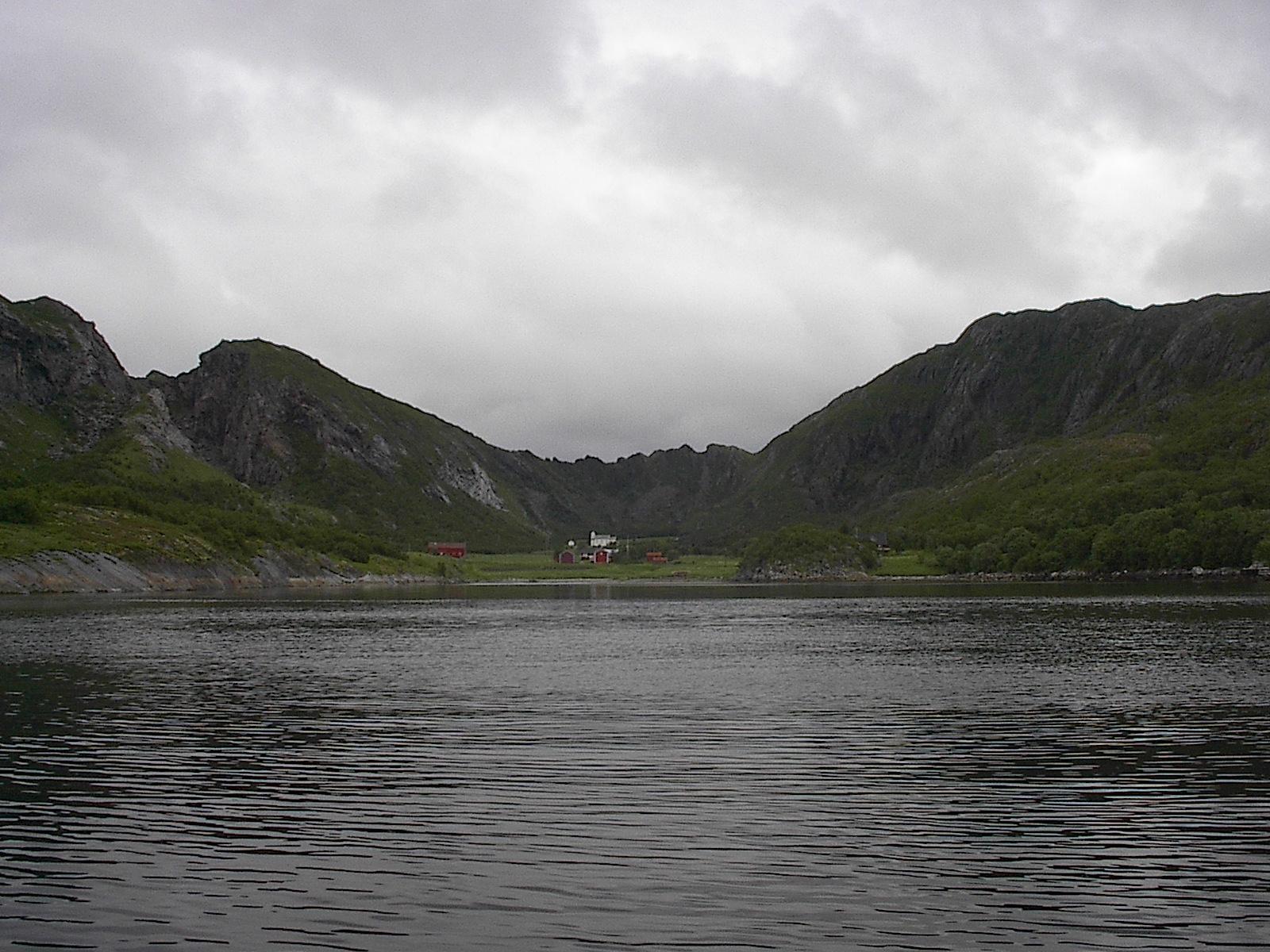
- View of the Nordvik area

- Nordland within Norway

- Nordvik within Nordland
- Coordinates: 66°07′19″N 12°30′32″E
- Country: Norway
- County: Nordland
- District: Helgeland
- Established: 1 July 1917
  - Preceded by: Herøy Municipality
- Disestablished: 1 Jan 1962
  - Succeeded by: Dønna Municipality
- Administrative centre: Solfjellsjøen

Area (upon dissolution)
  - Total: 114.2 km^{2} (44.1 sq mi)
  - Rank: #507 in Norway
- Highest elevation: 855.1 m (2,805 ft)

Population (1961)
  - Total: 1,315
  - Rank: #589 in Norway
  - Density: 11.5/km^{2} (30/sq mi)
  - Change (10 years): ▼ −14.1%
- Demonym: Nordvik-folk

Official language
  - Norwegian form: Bokmål
- Time zone: UTC+01:00 (CET)
  - Summer (DST): UTC+02:00 (CEST)
- ISO 3166 code: NO-1819

Nordvik is a former municipality in Nordland county, Norway. The 114-square-kilometre (44 sq mi) municipality existed from 1917 until its dissolution in 1962. The island municipality encompassed the southern part of the island of Dønna as well as the smaller surrounding islands of Vandve, Slapøya, Havstein, and many others in what is now the southern part of Dønna Municipality. The administrative centre was the village of Solfjellsjøen. The municipality had 2 churches: Nordvik Church in the north and Hæstad Church in the south.

Prior to its dissolution in 1962, the 114-square-kilometre (44 sq mi) municipality was the 507th largest by area out of the 731 municipalities in Norway. Nordvik Municipality was the 589th most populous municipality in Norway with a population of about 1,315. The municipality's population density was 11.5 inhabitants per square kilometre (30/sq mi) and its population had decreased by 14.1% over the previous 10-year period.

== General information ==
The municipality of Nordvik was established on 1 July 1917 when Herøy Municipality was divided into two: the new Nordvik Municipality was in the north and a now-smaller Herøy Municipality in the south. Initially, Nordvik Municipality had a population of 1,530. During the 1960s, there were many municipal mergers across Norway due to the work of the Schei Committee. On 1 January 1962, Nordvik Municipality (population: 1,293) was merged with the part of Herøy Municipality located on the island of Dønna (population: 19), most of Dønnes Municipality (population: 1,348), and the part of Nesna Municipality on the island of Løkta (population: 80) to become the new Dønna Municipality.

=== Name ===
The municipality (originally the parish) is named after the old Nordviken farm (Old Norse: Norðvík). The first element is norðr which means "north". The last element is vík which means "bay" or "inlet from the sea".

=== Churches ===
The Church of Norway had one parish (sokn) within Nordvik Municipality. At the time of the municipal dissolution, it was part of the Herøy prestegjeld and the Nord-Helgeland prosti (deanery) in the Diocese of Sør-Hålogaland.

Churches in Nordvik Municipality
Parish (sokn)	Church name	Location of the church	Year built
Nordvik	Nordvik Church	Nordvik (north of Solfjellsjøen)	1877
Nordvik	Hæstad Chapel	Hestad	1912

== Geography ==
The highest point in the municipality was the 855.1-metre (2,805 ft) tall mountain Dønnmannen, on the southern border with Herøy Municipality. Nordvik Municipality was primarily located on the southern part of the island of Dønna plus many smaller surrounding islands. It was located south of Dønnes Municipality and north of Herøy Municipality.

== Government ==
While it existed, Nordvik Municipality was responsible for primary education (through 10th grade), outpatient health services, senior citizen services, welfare and other social services, zoning, economic development, and municipal roads and utilities. The municipality was governed by a municipal council of directly elected representatives. The mayor was indirectly elected by a vote of the municipal council. The municipality was under the jurisdiction of the Hålogaland Court of Appeal.

=== Municipal council ===
The municipal council (Herredsstyre) of Nordvik Municipality was made up of 17 representatives that were elected to four year terms. The tables below show the historical composition of the council by political party.

Nordvik herredsstyre 1959–1961
Party name (in Norwegian)	Number of representatives
Labour Party (Arbeiderpartiet)	3
Local List(s) (Lokale lister)	14
Total number of members:	17
Note: On 1 January 1964, Nordvik Municipality became part of Dønna Municipality.

Nordvik herredsstyre 1955–1959
Party name (in Norwegian)	Number of representatives
Labour Party (Arbeiderpartiet)	5
Joint List(s) of Non-Socialist Parties (Borgerlige Felleslister)	4
Local List(s) (Lokale lister)	8
Total number of members:	17

Nordvik herredsstyre 1951–1955
Party name (in Norwegian)	Number of representatives
Labour Party (Arbeiderpartiet)	8
Joint List(s) of Non-Socialist Parties (Borgerlige Felleslister)	7
Local List(s) (Lokale lister)	1
Total number of members:	16

Nordvik herredsstyre 1947–1951
Party name (in Norwegian)	Number of representatives
Labour Party (Arbeiderpartiet)	8
Joint List(s) of Non-Socialist Parties (Borgerlige Felleslister)	8
Total number of members:	16

Nordvik herredsstyre 1945–1947
Party name (in Norwegian)	Number of representatives
Labour Party (Arbeiderpartiet)	8
Local List(s) (Lokale lister)	8
Total number of members:	16

Nordvik herredsstyre 1937–1941*
Party name (in Norwegian)	Number of representatives
Labour Party (Arbeiderpartiet)	3
Local List(s) (Lokale lister)	9
Total number of members:	12
Note: Due to the German occupation of Norway during World War II, no elections were held for new municipal councils until after the war ended in 1945.

=== Mayors ===
The mayor (Norwegian: ordfører) of Nordvik Municipality was the political leader of the municipality and the chairperson of the municipal council. Here is a list of people who held this position:

- 1917–1919: Hans Johnsen
- 1919–1925: Jens Norum
- 1925–1928: Johan Teigstad
- 1928–1931: Hans Mørch
- 1931–1934: Søren Bergfjord
- 1934–1937: Hans Mørch
- 1937–1945: Søren Bergfjord
- 1945–1945: Anton Solfjell
- 1946–1947: Arne Skar (Ap)
- 1948–1961: Fridtjof Leonhard Hjortdahl (H)

== See also ==
- List of former municipalities of Norway
