= Dønnes Municipality =

Former municipality in Nordland, Norway

Dønnes Municipality Dønnes herred
- Former municipality
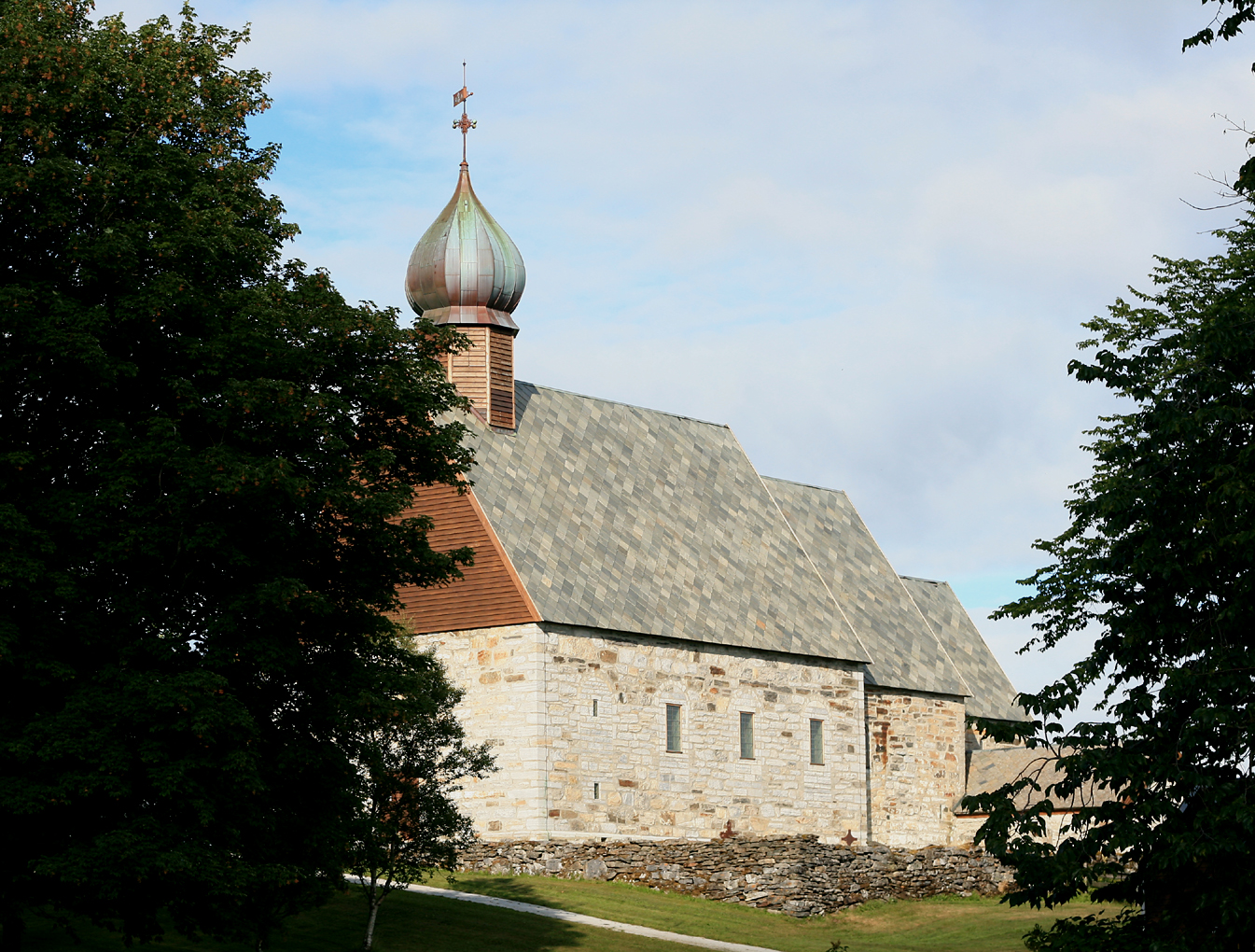

- Nordland within Norway

- Dønnes within Nordland
- Coordinates: 66°12′13″N 12°35′14″E
- Country: Norway
- County: Nordland
- District: Helgeland
- Established: 1 July 1888
  - Preceded by: Nesna Municipality
- Disestablished: 1 Jan 1962
  - Succeeded by: Dønna Municipality
- Administrative centre: Dønnes

Area (upon dissolution)
  - Total: 88.3 km^{2} (34.1 sq mi)
  - Rank: #556 in Norway
- Highest elevation: 818 m (2,684 ft)

Population (1961)
  - Total: 1,542
  - Rank: #548 in Norway
  - Density: 17.5/km^{2} (45/sq mi)
  - Change (10 years): ▼ −5%
- Demonym: Dønnværing

Official language
  - Norwegian form: Bokmål
- Time zone: UTC+01:00 (CET)
  - Summer (DST): UTC+02:00 (CEST)
- ISO 3166 code: NO-1827

Dønnes is a former municipality in Nordland county, Norway. The 88-square-kilometre (34 sq mi) municipality existed from 1888 until its dissolution in 1962. The area is now part of Dønna Municipality and Nesna Municipality in the traditional district of Helgeland. The administrative centre was the village of Dønnes.

Prior to its dissolution in 1962, the 88-square-kilometre (34 sq mi) municipality was the 556th largest by area out of the 731 municipalities in Norway. Dønnes Municipality was the 548th most populous municipality in Norway with a population of about 1,542. The municipality's population density was 17.5 inhabitants per square kilometre (45/sq mi) and its population had decreased by 5% over the previous 10-year period.

== General information ==
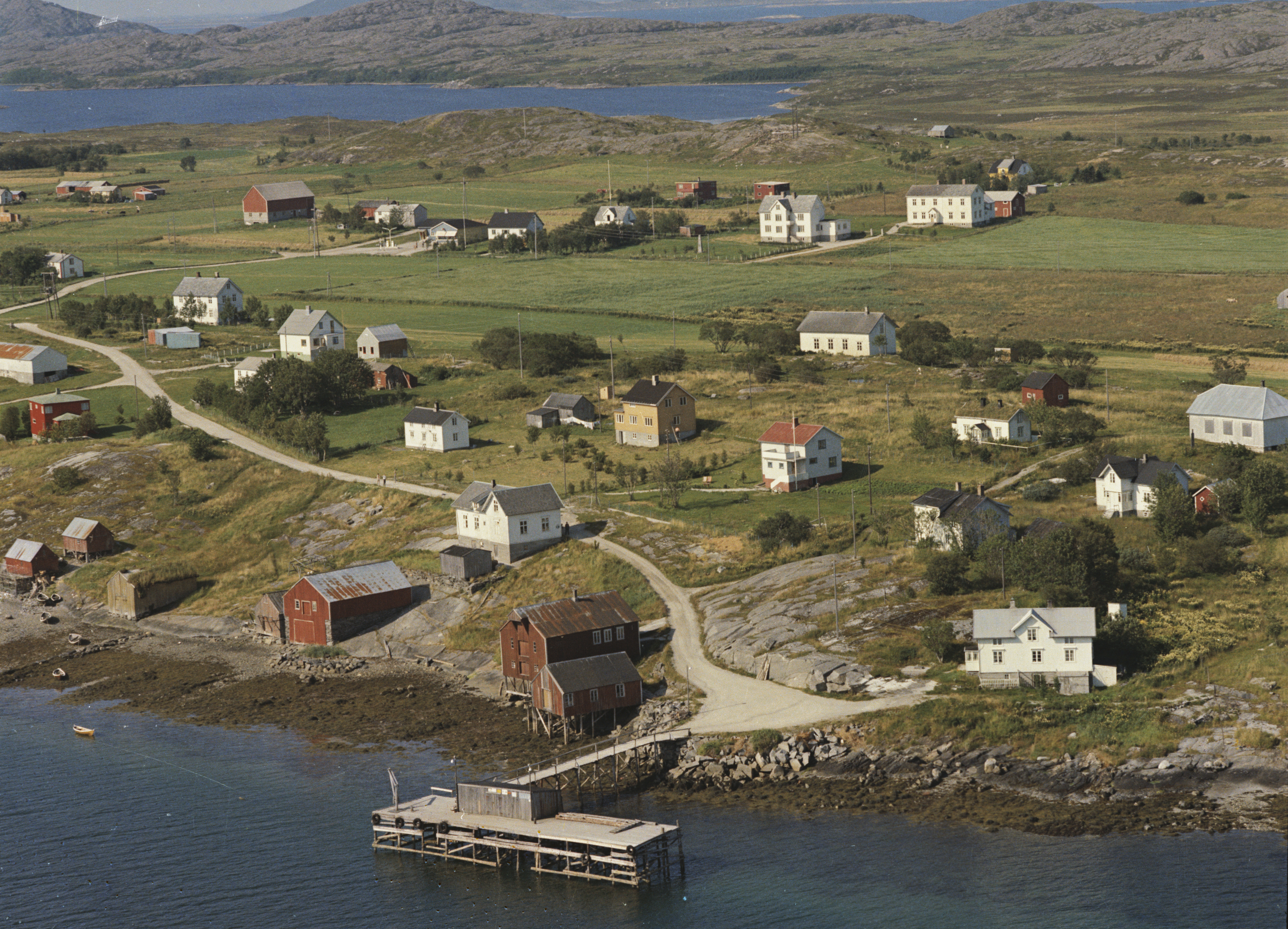
Village of Glein in Dønnes

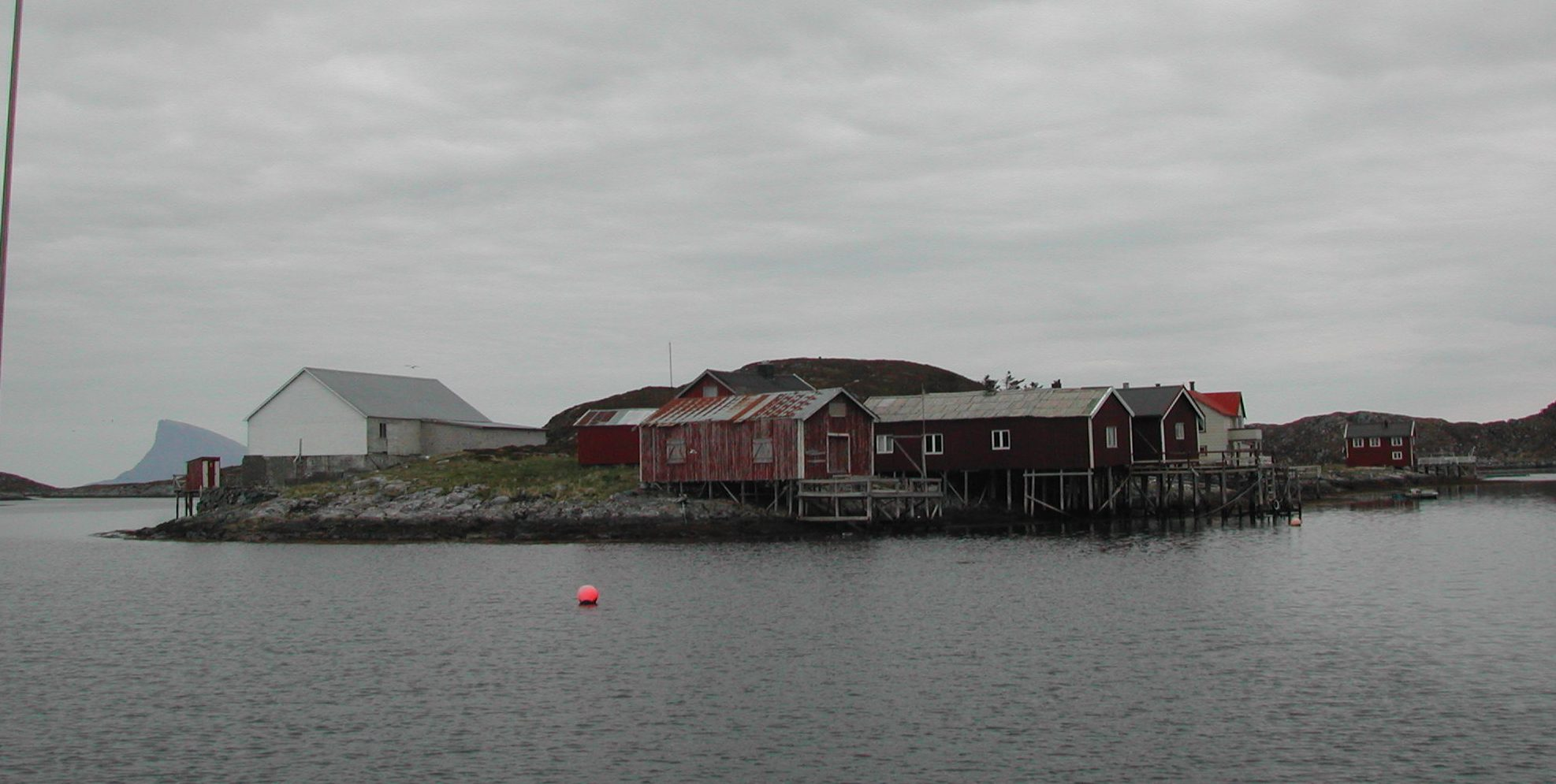
Åsværet islands in Dønnes

Dønnes was established as a municipality on 1 July 1888 when the western part of the old Nesna Municipality was separated to form a new municipality. Initially, Dønnes Municipality had a population of 1,348. During the 1960s, there were many municipal mergers across Norway due to the work of the Schei Committee. On 1 January 1962, Dønnes Municipality ceased to exist. The part of Dønnes Municipality on the island of Tomma (population: 80) was merged into Nesna Municipality. The remainder of Dønnes Municipality (population: 1,348) was merged with the part of Herøy Municipality on the island of Dønna (population: 19), all of Nordvik Municipality (population: 1,293), and the part of Nesna Municipality on the island of Løkta (population: 80) to become the new Dønna Municipality.

=== Name ===
The municipality (originally the parish) is named after the old Dønnes farm (Old Norse: Dynjarnes) since the first Dønnes Church was built there. The first element is dynja which is the genitive case of the old name of the island of Dønna. The island name means to "rumble" or "roar" (referring to the swell of the waves on the island). The last element is nes which means "headland".

=== Churches ===
The Church of Norway had one parish (sokn) within Dønnes Municipality. At the time of the municipal dissolution, it was part of the Nesna prestegjeld and the Nord-Helgeland prosti (deanery) in the Diocese of Sør-Hålogaland.

Churches in Dønnes Municipality
Parish (sokn)	Church name	Location of the church	Year built
Dønnes	Dønnes Church	Dønnes	c. 1200
Dønnes	Husby Chapel	Husby	1905
Dønnes	Vandve Church	Vandve	1956

== Government ==
While it existed, Dønnes Municipality was responsible for primary education (through 10th grade), outpatient health services, senior citizen services, welfare and other social services, zoning, economic development, and municipal roads and utilities. The municipality was governed by a municipal council of directly elected representatives. The mayor was indirectly elected by a vote of the municipal council. The municipality was under the jurisdiction of the Hålogaland Court of Appeal.

=== Municipal council ===
The municipal council (Herredsstyre) of Dønnes Municipality was made up of 17 representatives that were elected to four year terms. The tables below show the historical composition of the council by political party.

Dønnes herredsstyre 1959–1963
Party name (in Norwegian)	Number of representatives
Local List(s) (Lokale lister)	17
Total number of members:	17
Note: On 1 January 1962, Dønnes Municipality was divided and it became part of Dønna Municipality and Nesna Municipality.

Dønnes herredsstyre 1955–1959
Party name (in Norwegian)	Number of representatives
Labour Party (Arbeiderpartiet)	3
Christian Democratic Party (Kristelig Folkeparti)	1
List of workers, fishermen, and small farmholders (Arbeidere, fiskere, småbrukere liste)	1
Joint List(s) of Non-Socialist Parties (Borgerlige Felleslister)	3
Local List(s) (Lokale lister)	9
Total number of members:	17

Dønnes herredsstyre 1951–1955
Party name (in Norwegian)	Number of representatives
Labour Party (Arbeiderpartiet)	4
Christian Democratic Party (Kristelig Folkeparti)	1
List of workers, fishermen, and small farmholders (Arbeidere, fiskere, småbrukere liste)	2
Joint List(s) of Non-Socialist Parties (Borgerlige Felleslister)	5
Local List(s) (Lokale lister)	4
Total number of members:	16

Dønnes herredsstyre 1947–1951
Party name (in Norwegian)	Number of representatives
Labour Party (Arbeiderpartiet)	4
Communist Party (Kommunistiske Parti)	1
Joint List(s) of Non-Socialist Parties (Borgerlige Felleslister)	1
Local List(s) (Lokale lister)	10
Total number of members:	16

Dønnes herredsstyre 1945–1947
Party name (in Norwegian)	Number of representatives
Labour Party (Arbeiderpartiet)	7
Joint List(s) of Non-Socialist Parties (Borgerlige Felleslister)	6
Local List(s) (Lokale lister)	3
Total number of members:	16

Dønnes herredsstyre 1937–1941*
Party name (in Norwegian)	Number of representatives
Labour Party (Arbeiderpartiet)	6
Joint List(s) of Non-Socialist Parties (Borgerlige Felleslister)	5
Local List(s) (Lokale lister)	5
Total number of members:	16
Note: Due to the German occupation of Norway during World War II, no elections were held for new municipal councils until after the war ended in 1945.

=== Mayors ===
The mayor (Norwegian: ordfører) of Dønnes Municipality was the political leader of the municipality and the chairperson of the municipal council. Here is a list of people who held this position:

- 1888–1901: Hans Johan Emahus Tønder Coldevin
- 1902–1907: Ivar Klæboe
- 1908–1913: Martin Dahl
- 1914–1916: Karl Gidske
- 1917–1920: Johan W.A. Sand
- 1921–1922: Albert Olsen
- 1922–1931: Karl Gidske
- 1931–1944: Arne Eliot Pedersen Rølvaag (NS)
- 1945–1945: Johan Løvdahl
- 1946–1947: Ebbe Jensen
- 1948–1956: Johannes Dahl
- 1956–1957: Einar Ellingsen
- 1958–1961: Arnold Nordøy

== Geography ==
The highest point in the municipality was the 818-metre (2,684 ft) tall mountain Tommtinden on the island of Tomma. The municipality encompassed the northern part of the island of Dønna, the western parts of the islands of Tomma and Løkta, and over 300 smaller surrounding islands, islets, and skerries.

=== Farms of Dønnes ===
Farm names were often used as part of Norwegian names, in addition to the person's given name and patronymic or inherited surname. Some families retained the farm name, or toponymic, as a surname when they emigrated, so in those cases tracing a surname may tell you specifically where in Norway the family was from. This tradition began to change in the mid to late 19th century, and inherited surnames were codified into law in 1923.

==== Map of farms ====
Coordinates are approximate. Note that each map has a maximum number of listings it can display, so the map has been divided into parts consistent with the enumeration districts (tellingskrets) in the 1920 census. This map will include one farm name per farm number; other farm names or subdivision numbers may exist.

Note that in 1920, the southern portion of today's Dønna Municipality was part of Nesna Municipality; the farms of that area are part of the Nesna farm map.

Dønnes municipality, 1920 census
Tellingskrets (enumeration districts): 1, Glein (lime); 2, Løkka (red); 3, Husby skolekrets for Tomma (blue); 4, Nord-Dønnæs (purple); 5, Stavseng (green); 6, Asvær (black). List of farms:
1 1: Skjeissjøen
2 2: Nyheim
3 13: Sigerstad
4 14: Glein
5 15: Breivik
6 16: Svinvik
7 17: Sandaker
8 18: Sund
9 19: Hov
10 20: Husby
11 21: Tomsvik
12 22: Tomeide
13 10: Rølvåg
14 12: Aakvik
15 3: Aakerøy
16 4: Aaker
17 5: Bø
18 6: Stavseng
19 7: Stavsengvik
20 8: Tuehaugen
21 9: Volnes
22 11: Nordøy

== See also ==
- List of former municipalities of Norway
