= Bjørn, Dønna =

Village in Dønna Municipality, Norway

Bjørn
- Village
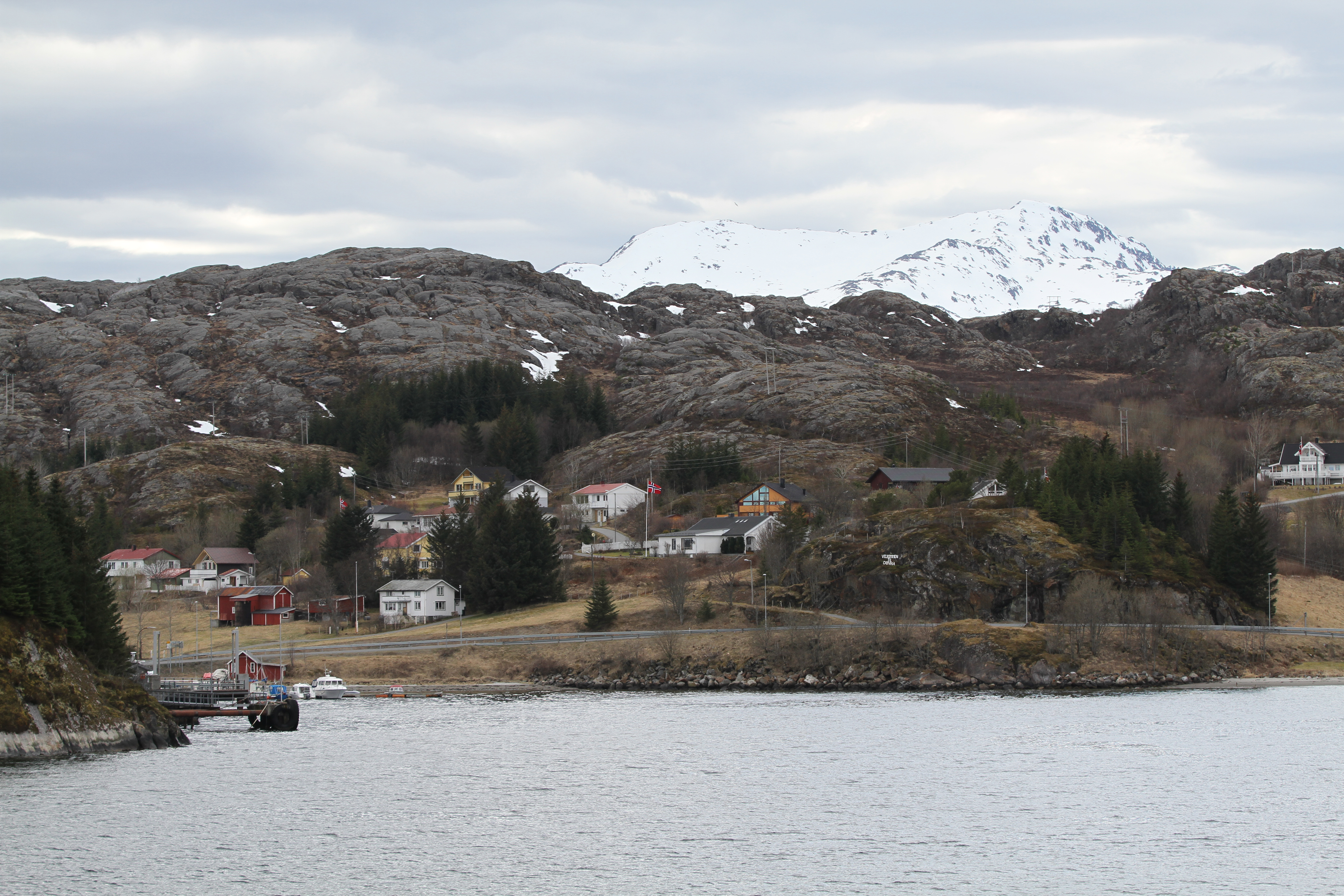
- View of the village
- Interactive map of Bjørn
- Location within Nordland Location within Norway
- Coordinates: 66.0817°N 12.5854°E
- Country: Norway
- Region: Northern Norway
- County: Nordland
- District: Helgeland
- Municipality: Dønna Municipality
- Elevation: 2 m (6.6 ft)
- Time zone: UTC+01:00 (CET)
  - Summer (DST): UTC+02:00 (CEST)
- Post Code: 8820 Dønna

Bjørn is a village in Dønna Municipality in Nordland county, Norway. The village is located on the east coast of the island of Dønna, about 5 kilometres (3.1 mi) northeast of the village of Hestad. The village has a regular ferry connection to the nearby island of Lokta and to the mainland town of Sandnessjøen. The village is the junction of the Norwegian County Road 828 and Norwegian County Road 809.

== History ==
In 1754, a royal decree was made to grant Bjørn permission to hold an annual market, called the Bjørnsmartnan. It was considered the country's second largest market after the Grundset market at Elverum. In the 1870s, there were up to 3,000 visitors in boats and about 160 buildings in use as shops during the market. The markets were held as late as the early 1900s. The tradition has been taken up again from 1981 with a market every two years.
