= Hestad =

Hestad may refer to:

== People ==
- Hestad (surname), a list of people with this surname

== Places ==
- Hestad, Dønna, a village in Dønna municipality in Nordland county, Norway
- Hestad Church, or Hæstad Church, a church in Dønna municipality in Nordland county, Norway
- Hestad, Vestland, a village in Sunnfjord municipality in Vestland county, Norway
- Hestad Chapel, a chapel in Sunnfjord municipality in Vestland county, Norway
