= Åsvær Lighthouse =

Coastal lighthouse in Dønna, Norway

Åsvær Lighthouse Åsvær fyrstasjon
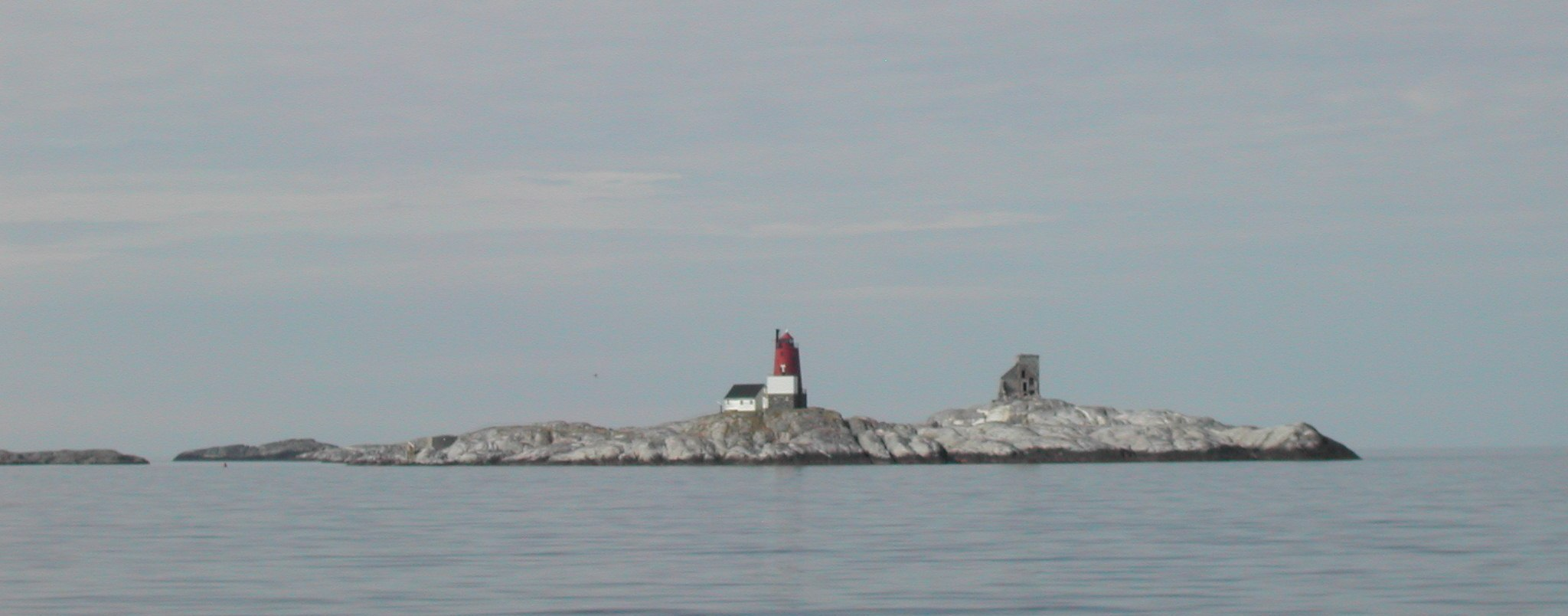
- View of the lighthouse
- Location of the lighthouse
- Location: Nordland, Norway
- Coordinates: 66.26°N 12.3°E

Tower
- Constructed: 1876 (first)
- Foundation: stone
- Construction: cast iron
- Automated: 1980
- Height: 18.5 metres (61 ft)
- Shape: cylindrical
- Markings: red tower
- Heritage: cultural heritage preservation in Norway

Light
- First lit: 1917 (current)
- Focal height: 24.5 metres (80 ft)
- Intensity: 28,800 candela
- Range: Red: 11.5 nmi (21.3 km; 13.2 mi) Green: 11 nmi (20 km; 13 mi) White: 14.2 nmi (26.3 km; 16.3 mi)
- Characteristic: Oc(2) WRG 8s
- Norway no.: 657300

Åsvær Lighthouse (Norwegian: Åsvær fyr) is a coastal lighthouse in Dønna Municipality in Nordland county, Norway. It is located on the island of Åsvær, about 10 kilometres (6.2 mi) north of the village of Vandve, about 16 kilometres (9.9 mi) northwest of the island of Dønna, and about 11 kilometres (6.8 mi) south of the village of Lovund.

The 18.5-metre (61 ft) tall lighthouse was first built in 1876. The original lighthouse was replaced in 1917 (after being destroyed in a storm). The new lighthouse was automated in 1980, and it was listed as a protected site in 2000.

The lighthouse includes an 18.5-metre (61 ft) tall red, cast iron tower. The light sits on top of the tower at an elevation of 24.5 metres (80 ft) above sea level. The 28,800-candela light can be seen for up to 14.2 nautical miles (26.3 km; 16.3 mi). The light emits a white, red, or green light (depending on direction), occulting in groups of two every eight seconds (Oc(2) WRG 8s).

== See also ==
- Lighthouses in Norway
- List of lighthouses in Norway
