= Dønna Municipality =

Municipality in Nordland, Norway

Dønna Municipality Dønna kommune
- Municipality
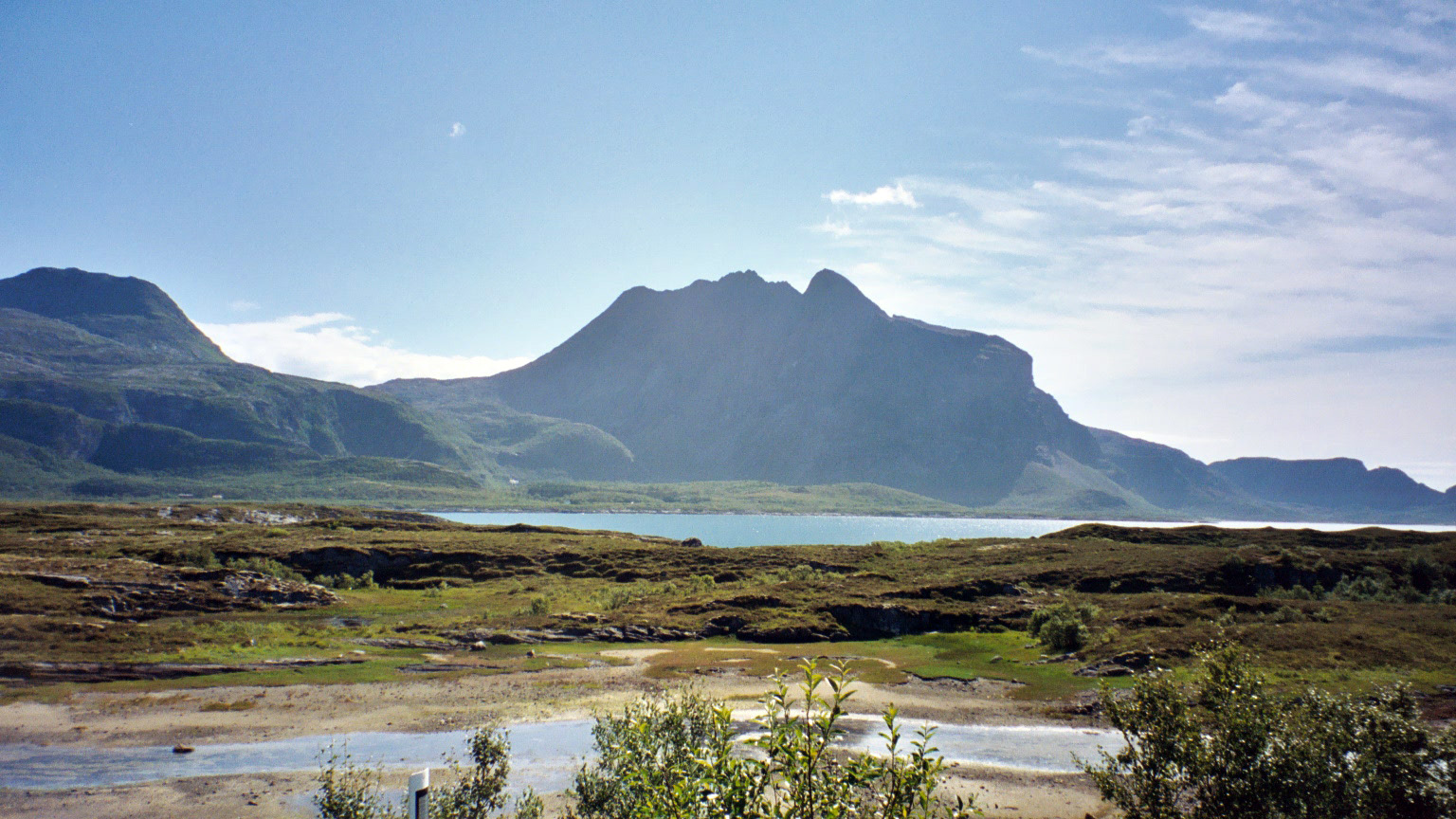

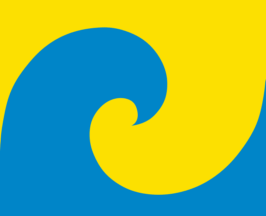
- Flag Coat of arms

- Nordland within Norway

- Dønna within Nordland
- Coordinates: 66°05′29″N 12°31′33″E
- Country: Norway
- County: Nordland
- District: Helgeland
- Established: 1 Jan 1962
  - Preceded by: Nordvik Municipality, Dønnes Municipality, and other areas
- Administrative centre: Solfjellsjøen

Government
  - Mayor (2024): John-Erik S. Johansen (Ap)

Area
  - Total: 192.57 km^{2} (74.35 sq mi)
  - Land: 186.41 km^{2} (71.97 sq mi)
  - Water: 6.16 km^{2} (2.38 sq mi) 3.2%
  - Rank: #305 in Norway
- Highest elevation: 855.1 m (2,805 ft)

Population (2024)
  - Total: 1,427
  - Rank: #305 in Norway
  - Density: 7.4/km^{2} (19/sq mi)
  - Change (10 years): ▲ +0.5%
- Demonym: Dønnværing

Official language
  - Norwegian form: Bokmål
- Time zone: UTC+01:00 (CET)
  - Summer (DST): UTC+02:00 (CEST)
- ISO 3166 code: NO-1827
- Website: Official website

Dønna is a municipality in Nordland county, Norway. It is part of the Helgeland region. The administrative centre of the island municipality is the village of Solfjellsjøen. Other villages include Bjørn, Dønnes, Hestad, Sandåker, and Vandve. The main island of Dønna is connected to the neighboring Herøy Municipality to the south by the Åkviksundet Bridge.

The 193-square-kilometre (75 sq mi) municipality is the 305th largest by area out of the 357 municipalities in Norway. Dønna Municipality is the 305th most populous municipality in Norway with a population of 1,427. The municipality's population density is 7.4 inhabitants per square kilometre (19/sq mi) and its population has increased by 0.5% over the previous 10-year period.

== General information ==
=== Municipal history ===
The municipality of Dønna was established on 1 January 1962 due to the work of the Schei Committee. The new municipality was created by merging these areas:

- all of Nordvik Municipality (population: 1,293)
- the part of Herøy Municipality on the southern tip of the island of Dønna (population: 19)
- the part of Nesna Municipality on the island Løkta (population: 80)
- the majority of Dønnes Municipality (population: 1,348), except for the part located on the island of Tomma.

The borders of Dønna Municipality have not changed since that time.

=== Name ===
The municipality is named after the island of Dønna (Old Norse: Dyn). The name is probably derived from the Old Norse verb dynja which means to "rumble" or "roar" (referring to the swell of the waves on the island).

=== Coat of arms ===
The coat of arms was granted on 29 May 1981. The official blazon is "Or a schnecke azure from base sinister to dexter" (Norwegian: Delt av gull og blått ved virvelsnitt). This means the arms have a field (background) that is divided by a line called a schnecke (a swirling clockwise spiral design that is looks like a wave). The field located above the line has a tincture of Or which means it is commonly colored yellow, but if it is made out of metal, then gold is used. The tincture below the line is blue. The arms are a canting symbol for the municipality since the Norwegian word dønning means "wave" or "swell". The arms were designed by Odd Fjordholm.

=== Churches ===
The Church of Norway has one parish (sokn) within Dønna Municipality. It is part of the Nord-Helgeland prosti (deanery) in the Diocese of Sør-Hålogaland.

Churches in Dønna Municipality
Parish (sokn)	Church name	Location of the church	Year built
Dønna	Dønnes Church	Dønnes	13th century
Dønna	Hæstad Church	Hestad	1912
Dønna	Løkta Church	Sandåker	1968
Dønna	Nordvik Church	Nordvik (near Solfjellsjøen)	1877
Dønna	Vandve Church	Vandve	1956

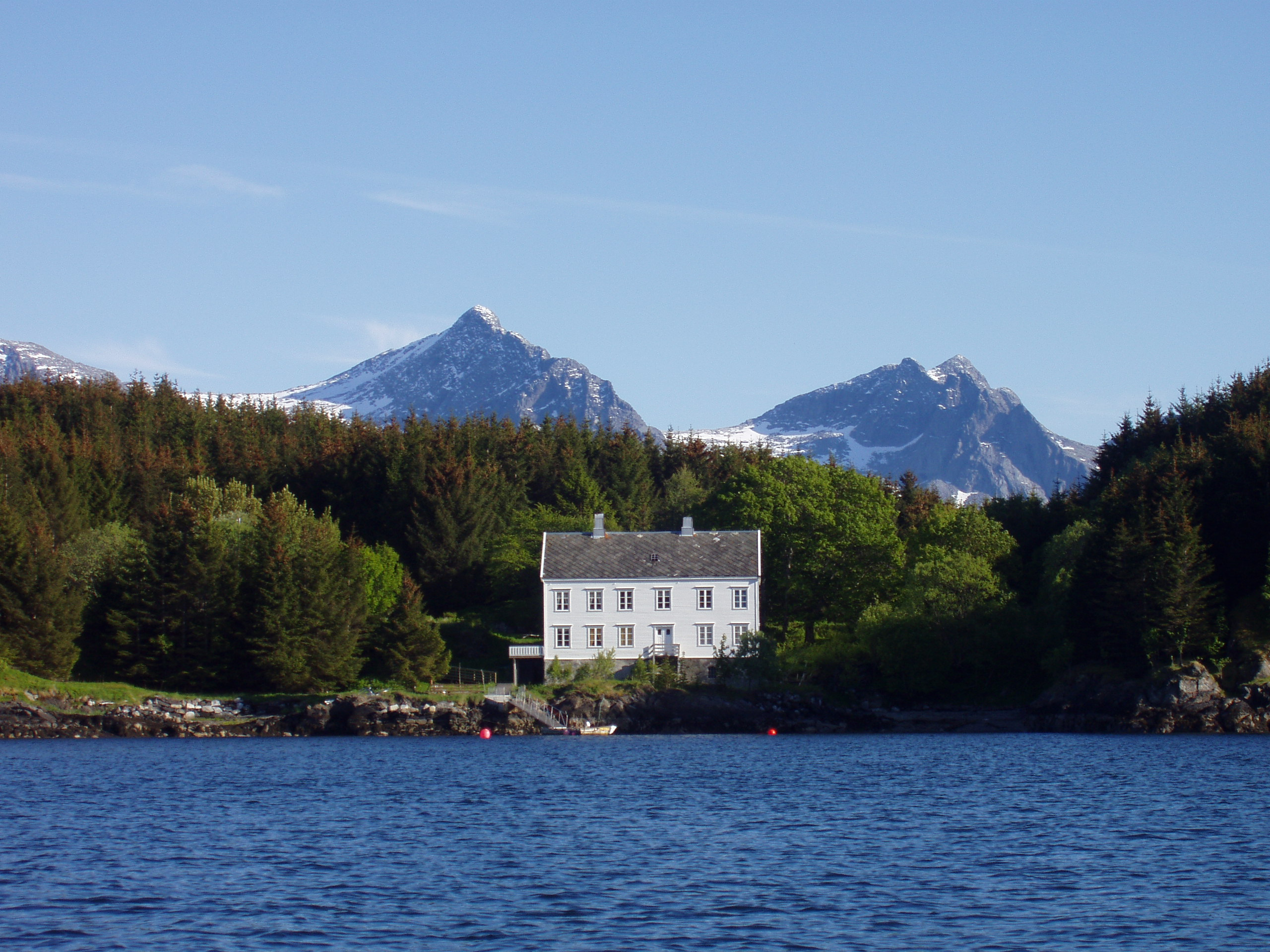
The old trading house at Lauvøy, surrounded by Sitka spruce

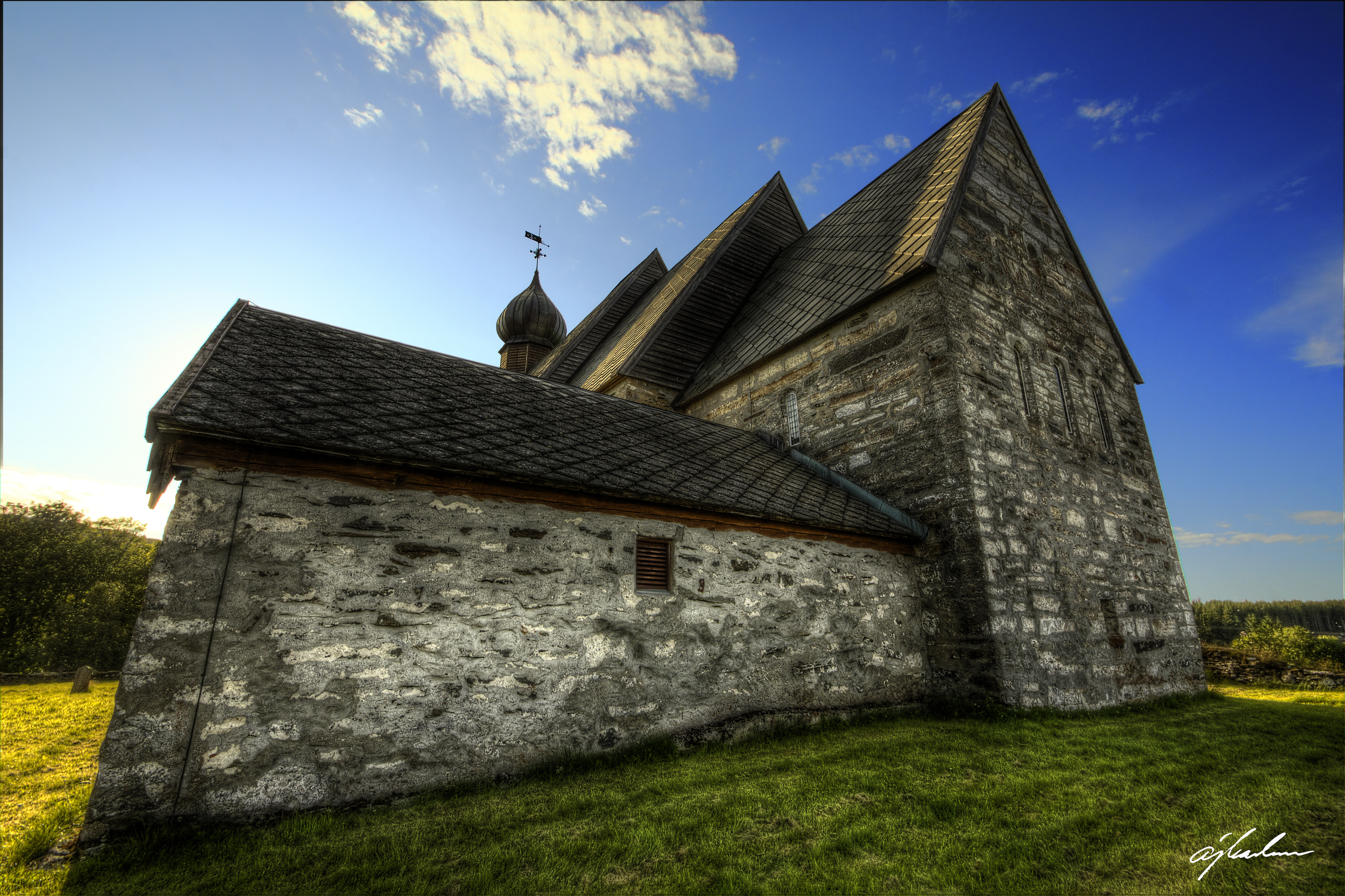
Dønnes Church

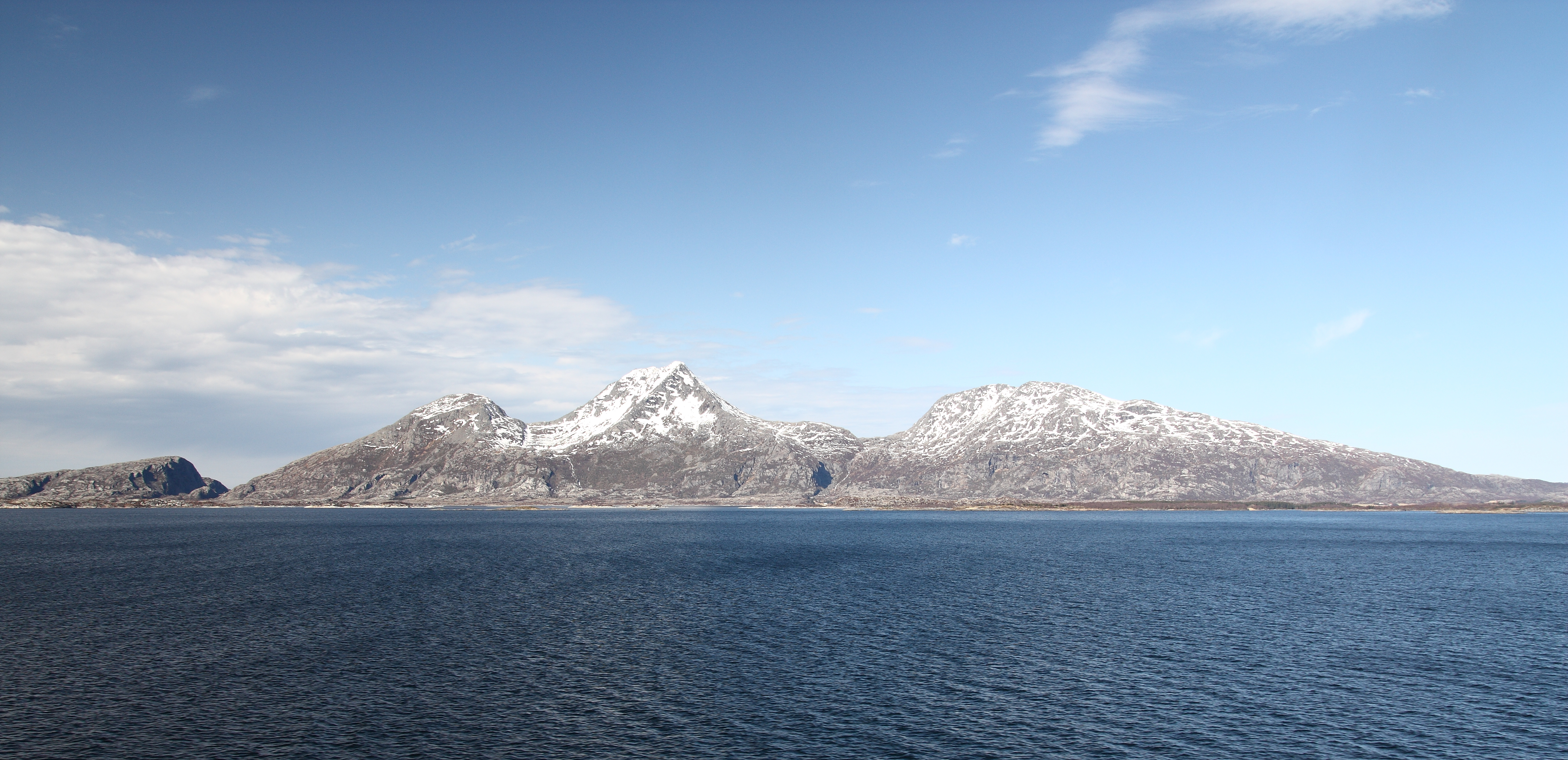
View of the Dønnmannen mountain

== Economy ==
Much of the industry focuses on fishing, aquaculture, and fish processing. There is also some agriculture, tourism, and some public services.

== Government ==
Dønna Municipality is responsible for primary education (through 10th grade), outpatient health services, senior citizen services, welfare and other social services, zoning, economic development, and municipal roads and utilities. The municipality is governed by a municipal council of directly elected representatives. The mayor is indirectly elected by a vote of the municipal council. The municipality is under the jurisdiction of the Helgeland District Court and the Hålogaland Court of Appeal.

=== Municipal council ===
The municipal council (Kommunestyre) of Dønna Municipality is made up of 17 representatives that are elected to four year terms. The tables below show the current and historical composition of the council by political party.

Dønna kommunestyre 2023–2027
Party name (in Norwegian)	Number of representatives
Labour Party (Arbeiderpartiet)	6
Conservative Party (Høyre)	3
Red Party (Rødt)	2
Centre Party (Senterpartiet)	4
Socialist Left Party (Sosialistisk Venstreparti)	2
Total number of members:	17

Dønna kommunestyre 2019–2023
Party name (in Norwegian)	Number of representatives
Labour Party (Arbeiderpartiet)	5
Conservative Party (Høyre)	4
Red Party (Rødt)	3
Centre Party (Senterpartiet)	3
Socialist Left Party (Sosialistisk Venstreparti)	2
Total number of members:	17

Dønna kommunestyre 2015–2019
Party name (in Norwegian)	Number of representatives
Labour Party (Arbeiderpartiet)	6
Progress Party (Fremskrittspartiet)	1
Conservative Party (Høyre)	2
Socialist Left Party (Sosialistisk Venstreparti)	3
Joint list of the Centre Party (Senterpartiet) and the Coastal Party (Kystpartiet)	5
Total number of members:	17

Dønna kommunestyre 2011–2015
Party name (in Norwegian)	Number of representatives
Labour Party (Arbeiderpartiet)	6
Progress Party (Fremskrittspartiet)	2
Conservative Party (Høyre)	2
Coastal Party (Kystpartiet)	2
Centre Party (Senterpartiet)	2
Socialist Left Party (Sosialistisk Venstreparti)	3
Total number of members:	17

Dønna kommunestyre 2007–2011
Party name (in Norwegian)	Number of representatives
Labour Party (Arbeiderpartiet)	6
Progress Party (Fremskrittspartiet)	4
Conservative Party (Høyre)	2
Coastal Party (Kystpartiet)	1
Centre Party (Senterpartiet)	2
Socialist Left Party (Sosialistisk Venstreparti)	2
Total number of members:	17

Dønna kommunestyre 2003–2007
Party name (in Norwegian)	Number of representatives
Labour Party (Arbeiderpartiet)	5
Conservative Party (Høyre)	3
Coastal Party (Kystpartiet)	1
Centre Party (Senterpartiet)	3
Socialist Left Party (Sosialistisk Venstreparti)	3
Cross-party Election (Tverrpolitisk Folkevalgte)	2
Total number of members:	17

Dønna kommunestyre 1999–2003
Party name (in Norwegian)	Number of representatives
Labour Party (Arbeiderpartiet)	8
Conservative Party (Høyre)	6
Centre Party (Senterpartiet)	5
Socialist Left Party (Sosialistisk Venstreparti)	2
Total number of members:	21

Dønna kommunestyre 1995–1999
Party name (in Norwegian)	Number of representatives
Labour Party (Arbeiderpartiet)	5
Conservative Party (Høyre)	5
Centre Party (Senterpartiet)	4
Socialist Left Party (Sosialistisk Venstreparti)	2
Joint list of the Pensioners' Party and free voters (Pensjonister og frie velgere)	1
Cross-party list (Tverrpolitisk liste)	4
Total number of members:	21

Dønna kommunestyre 1991–1995
Party name (in Norwegian)	Number of representatives
Labour Party (Arbeiderpartiet)	6
Conservative Party (Høyre)	4
Christian Democratic Party (Kristelig Folkeparti)	1
Centre Party (Senterpartiet)	5
Socialist Left Party (Sosialistisk Venstreparti)	3
Cross-party list (Tverrpolitisk liste)	2
Total number of members:	21

Dønna kommunestyre 1987–1991
Party name (in Norwegian)	Number of representatives
Labour Party (Arbeiderpartiet)	9
Conservative Party (Høyre)	5
Christian Democratic Party (Kristelig Folkeparti)	1
Red Electoral Alliance (Rød Valgallianse)	1
Centre Party (Senterpartiet)	4
Socialist Left Party (Sosialistisk Venstreparti)	1
Total number of members:	21

Dønna kommunestyre 1983–1987
Party name (in Norwegian)	Number of representatives
Labour Party (Arbeiderpartiet)	9
Conservative Party (Høyre)	4
Christian Democratic Party (Kristelig Folkeparti)	1
Centre Party (Senterpartiet)	3
Socialist Left Party (Sosialistisk Venstreparti)	2
Dønna cross-party list (Dønna Tverrpolitiske liste)	2
Total number of members:	21

Dønna kommunestyre 1979–1983
Party name (in Norwegian)	Number of representatives
Labour Party (Arbeiderpartiet)	6
Conservative Party (Høyre)	7
Christian Democratic Party (Kristelig Folkeparti)	2
Centre Party (Senterpartiet)	4
Socialist Left Party (Sosialistisk Venstreparti)	2
Total number of members:	21

Dønna kommunestyre 1975–1979
Party name (in Norwegian)	Number of representatives
Labour Party (Arbeiderpartiet)	7
Centre Party (Senterpartiet)	6
Socialist Left Party (Sosialistisk Venstreparti)	2
Joint list of the Conservative Party (Høyre) and Christian Democratic Party (Kristelig Folkeparti)	6
Total number of members:	21

Dønna kommunestyre 1971–1975
Party name (in Norwegian)	Number of representatives
Labour Party (Arbeiderpartiet)	10
Conservative Party (Høyre)	4
Christian Democratic Party (Kristelig Folkeparti)	2
Centre Party (Senterpartiet)	4
Local List(s) (Lokale lister)	1
Total number of members:	21

Dønna kommunestyre 1967–1971
Party name (in Norwegian)	Number of representatives
Labour Party (Arbeiderpartiet)	7
Conservative Party (Høyre)	4
Christian Democratic Party (Kristelig Folkeparti)	2
Centre Party (Senterpartiet)	3
Liberal Party (Venstre)	1
Local List(s) (Lokale lister)	4
Total number of members:	21

Dønna kommunestyre 1963–1967
Party name (in Norwegian)	Number of representatives
Labour Party (Arbeiderpartiet)	7
Conservative Party (Høyre)	2
Christian Democratic Party (Kristelig Folkeparti)	2
Centre Party (Senterpartiet)	3
Joint List(s) of Non-Socialist Parties (Borgerlige Felleslister)	7
Total number of members:	21

=== Mayors ===
The mayor (Norwegian: ordfører) of Dønna Municipality is the political leader of the municipality and the chairperson of the municipal council. Here is a list of people who have held this position:

- 1962–1963: Fridtjof Leonhard Hjortdahl (H)
- 1963–1975: Hans Gården (H)
- 1975–1979: Gunnar Horsgård (Sp)
- 1979–1983: Hans Gården (H)
- 1983–1987: Helge Emilsen (Ap)
- 1987–1991: Finn Hjortdahl (H)
- 1991–1995: Steinar Horsgård (Sp)
- 1995–2003: Anne Sofie Sand Mathisen (Ap)
- 2003–2007: Steinar Horsgård (Sp)
- 2007–2011: Ingunn Laumann (Ap)
- 2011–2015: Anne Sofie Sand Mathisen (Ap)
- 2015–2019: John-Erik Skjellnes Johansen (Ap)
- 2019–2023: Nils Jenssen (Sp)
- 2024–present: John-Erik Skjellnes Johansen (Ap)

== Geography ==
Dønna is located in the outer, coastal part of Helgeland which also consists of Leirfjord Municipality, Alstahaug Municipality, and Herøy Municipality. The municipality is made up of a large archipelago consisting of islands, islets, and reefs. The three largest islands in the municipality are Dønna, Løkta, and Vandve. The Åsværet islands (and the Åsvær Lighthouse) lie in the western part of the municipality. The island municipality is situated at the mouth of the Ranfjorden. The highest point in the municipality is the 855.1-metre (2,805 ft) tall mountain Dønnmannen on the island of Dønna.

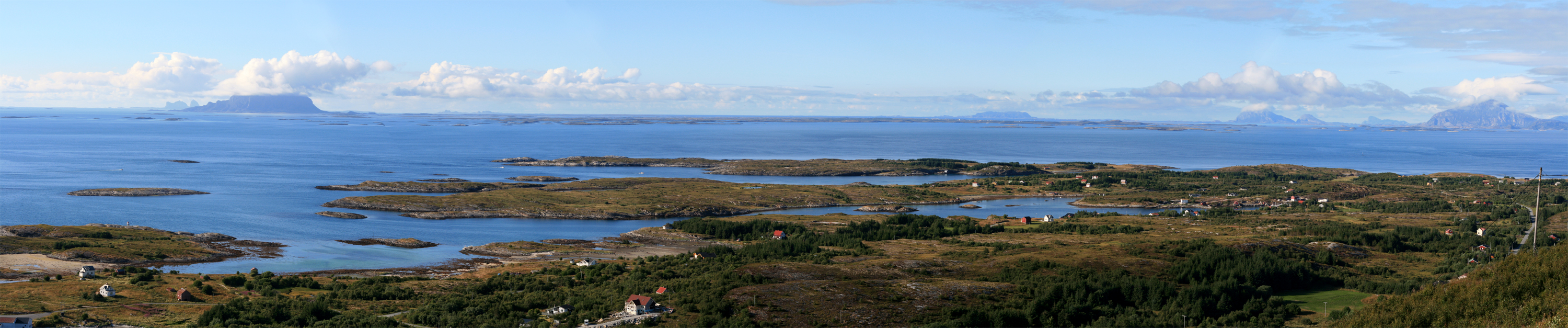
View from Dønnesfjellet, Dønna. The strandflaten lowland in the foreground and several islands with unique mountain formations visible in the distance

== Farms of Dønna ==
Historically, the land of Dønna was divided up into named farms. These farms were used in census and tax records and are useful for genalogical research.

=== Map of farms ===
Note: Coordinates are approximate. The map has been divided into parts consistent with the enumeration districts (Norwegian: tellingskrets) in the 1920 census of Norway. As this census was taken in 1920, and the boundaries of the municipality changed in 1962, this map is not consistent with modern enumeration districts. This map will include one farm name per farm number; other farm names or subdivision numbers may exist.

Dønna municipality, tellingskrets 1-5, from 1920 census
Tellingskrets (enumeration districts):
1. Glein (lime)
2. Løkka (red)
3. Husby skolekrets for Tomma (blue)
4. Nord-Dønnæs (purple)
5. Stavseng (black)
List of farms:
1 1: Skeim
2 2: Vaag
3 13: Sigerstad
4 14: Glein
5 15: Breivik
6 16: Kobberdal
7 17: Sandaaker
8 18: Sund
9 19: Hov
10 20: Husby
11 10: Rølvaag
12 11: Dønnes
13 12: Aakvik
14 3: Aakerøen
15 4: Aaker
16 5: Bø
17 6: Stavseng
18 7: Stavsengvik
19 8: Titternes
20 9: Volnes
21 Dønnes kirke (church), likely built in the 1200s; first record in 1308
22 Løkta kapell (chapel), built 1968
23 Hæstad kirke (church), built 1913
24 Nordvik kirke (church), built 1871
25 Vandve kapell (chapel), built 1968

==== Farm names and numbers ====
Following are the farms in Dønna municipality, as they are listed in O. Rygh's series "Norske Gaardnavne" ("Norwegian Farm Names"), the Nordland volume of which was published in 1905.

See also: Digital version of Norske Gaardnavne - Nordland (in Norwegian)

The farm numbers are used in some census records, and numbers that are near each other indicate that those farms are geographically proximate. Handwritten Norwegian sources, particularly those prior to 1800, may use variants on these names. For recorded variants before 1723, see the digital version of O. Rygh.

Farm names were often used as part of Norwegian names, in addition to the person's given name and patronymic or inherited surname. Some families retained the farm name, or toponymic, as a surname when they emigrated, so in those cases tracing a surname may tell you specifically where in Norway the family was from. This tradition began to change in the mid to late 19th century, and inherited surnames were codified into law in 1923.

If you can't find an entry when you are searching for a word that starts with AE, Ae, O, A or Aa, it may have been transcribed from one of those letters not used in English. Try looking for it under the Norwegian letter; Æ, Ø, and Å appear at the end of the Norwegian alphabet.

Farm Name	Farm Number
Skeim	1
Kamman, Vaag	2
Aakerøen	3
Aaker	4
Bø	5
Stavseng	6
Stavsengvik	7
Titternes	8
Volnes	9
Rølvaag	10
Dønnes	11
Aakvik	12
Sigerstad	13
Glein	14
Breivik	15
Kobberdal	16
Sandaaker	17
Sund	18
Hov	19
Husby	20

== Notable people ==
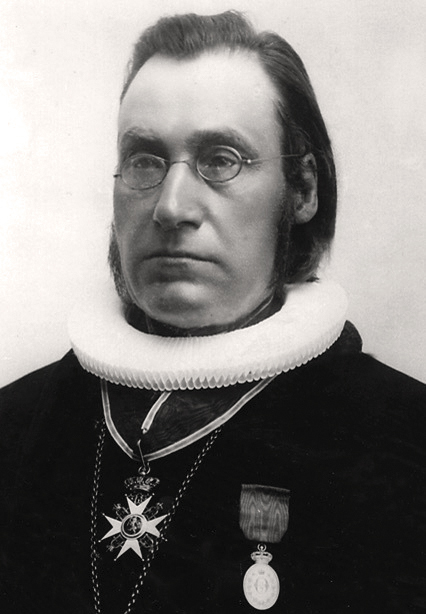
Anton Chr. Bang

- Gjeble Pederssøn (ca.1490 at Teigstad – 1557), a priest who was the first Lutheran bishop in Norway
- Petter Dass (ca.1647 – 1707), a Lutheran priest and poet; (birthplace disputed).
- Erasmus Zahl (1826 in Nordvika – 1900), a privileged trader and figure of the social hierarchy
- Anton Christian Bang (1840 on Dønna – 1913), a theologian, historian, politician, and Bishop of Oslo from 1896 to 1912
- Fredrikke Tønder-Olsen, (Norwegian Wiki) (1856 on Dønna - 1931), a feminist pioneer
- Julius J. Olson (1875 on Dønna – 1955), a Minnesota Supreme Court justice
- Ole Edvart Rølvaag (1876 on Dønna – 1931), a Norwegian-American author
- Axel Coldevin (1900 on Dønna – 1992), a historian who wrote about trade and industry
- Steinar Bastesen (born 1945 on Dønna), a Norwegian politician, fisherman, and whaler
- Roy Jacobsen (born 1954), a novelist and short-story writer who lives periodically on Dønna
- Odd Eriksen (born 1955), a politician who stopped an Algerian hijacker; brought up on Dønna
- Jostein Pedersen (born 1959 in Dønna), a musical journalist, reporter, and TV commentator
