= Dønnes Church =

Church in Nordland, Norway

- Dønnes kirke
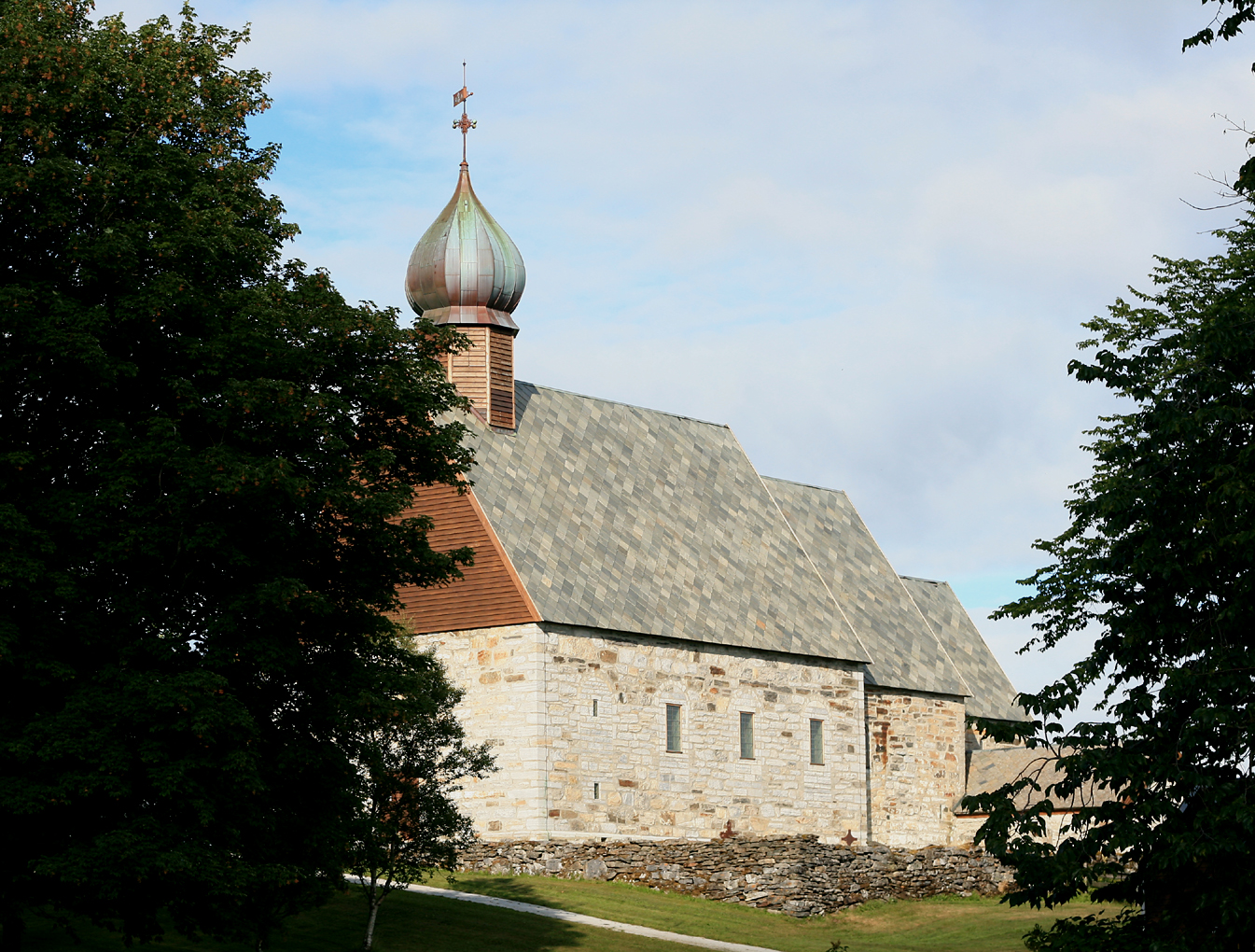
- View of the church
- Dønnes Church
- 66.2037427°N 12.58751517°E
- Location: Dønna Municipality, Nordland
- Country: Norway
- Denomination: Church of Norway
- Previous denomination: Catholic Church
- Churchmanship: Evangelical Lutheran

History
- Status: Parish church
- Founded: 13th century

Architecture
- Functional status: Active
- Architectural type: Long church
- Completed: c. 1230 (796 years ago)

Specifications
- Materials: Stone

Administration
- Diocese: Sør-Hålogaland
- Deanery: Nord-Helgeland prosti
- Parish: Dønna
- Norwegian Cultural Heritage Site
- Type: Church
- Status: Automatically protected
- ID: 84045

Dønnes Church (Norwegian: Dønnes kirke) is a 13th-century parish church of the Church of Norway in Dønna Municipality in Nordland county, Norway. It is located in the village of Dønnes on the northern part of the island of Dønna. It is one of the churches for the Dønna parish which is part of the Nord-Helgeland prosti (deanery) in the Diocese of Sør-Hålogaland. The stone church was built in a long church style during the 13th century using plans drawn up by an unknown architect.

Some of the interior decorations include Madonna with Child from 1200s, a figure of St. Laurentius (St. Lavrans) from the 1400s, and a carved Baroque style pulpit from the 1600s. The altarpiece is from 1670.

== History ==
The earliest existing historical records of the church date back to the year 1308, but the church was likely built during the first half of the 1200s, and there may have been a church on the site prior to the construction of this stone church. In 1584, written descriptions of the church state that it was in such poor condition that it was preferable to have the worship services outside in the graveyard rather than inside the building. In 1651, the church was purchased by Preben von Ahnen. In 1675, the church was sold to Peter Christoffersen Tønder. In 1796, the church was sold to a Mission College.

In 1814, this church served as an election church (Norwegian: valgkirke). Together with more than 300 other parish churches across Norway, it was a polling station for elections to the 1814 Norwegian Constituent Assembly which wrote the Constitution of Norway. This was Norway's first national elections. Each church parish was a constituency that elected people called "electors" who later met together in each county to elect the representatives for the assembly that was to meet at Eidsvoll Manor later that year.

In 1824, the church was sold out of private ownership to the people of the Dønnes parish. In 1866, the western part of the nave was torn down and rebuilt wider and longer so that the church would increase its capacity. The stone church has been renovated several times since then. In the 1960s and 1970s, Dønnes Church was examined and arranging under the leadership of Håkon Christie. Restoration work was completed in 1974.

== Media gallery ==
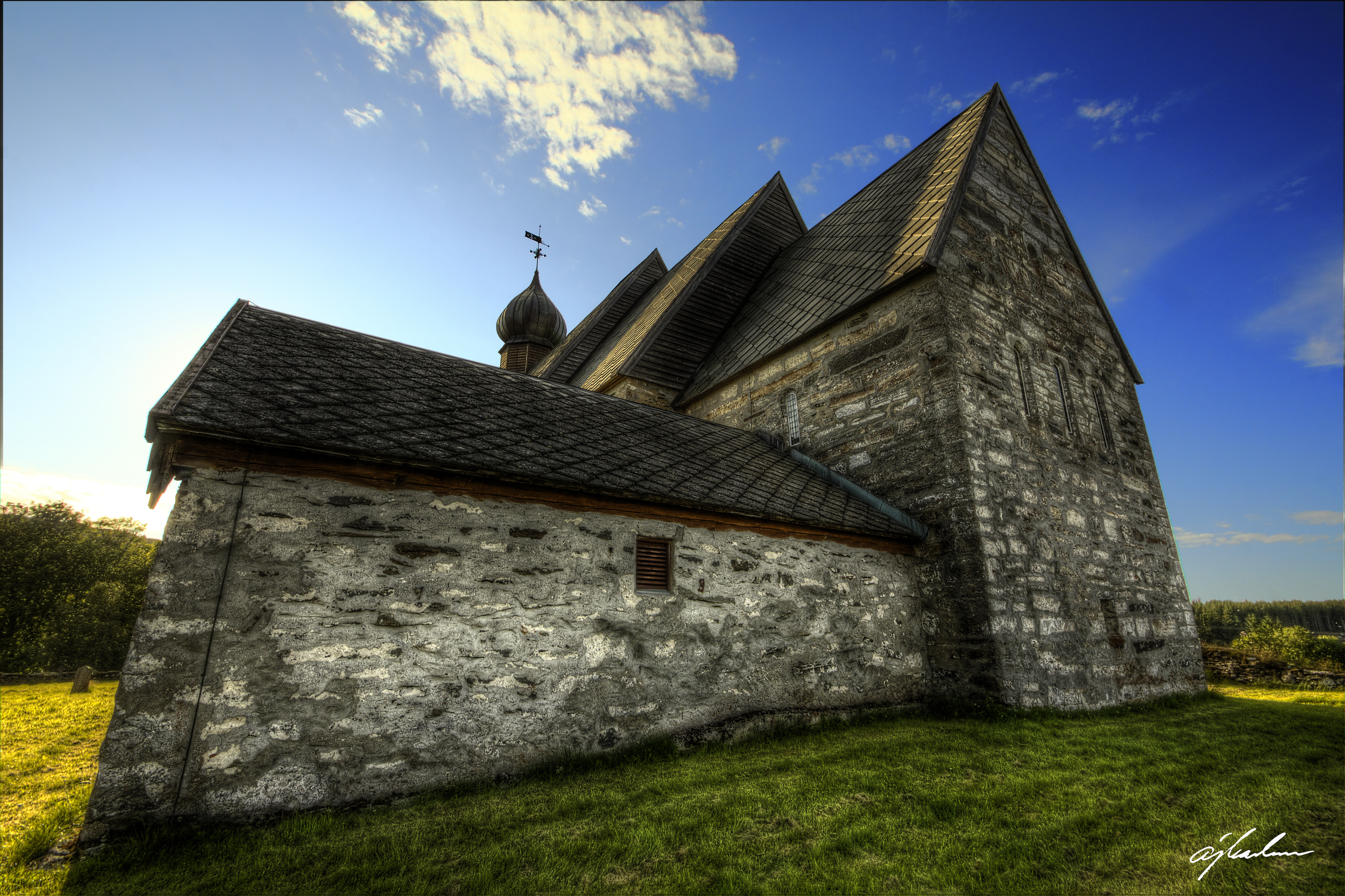
Rear view of Dønnes Church

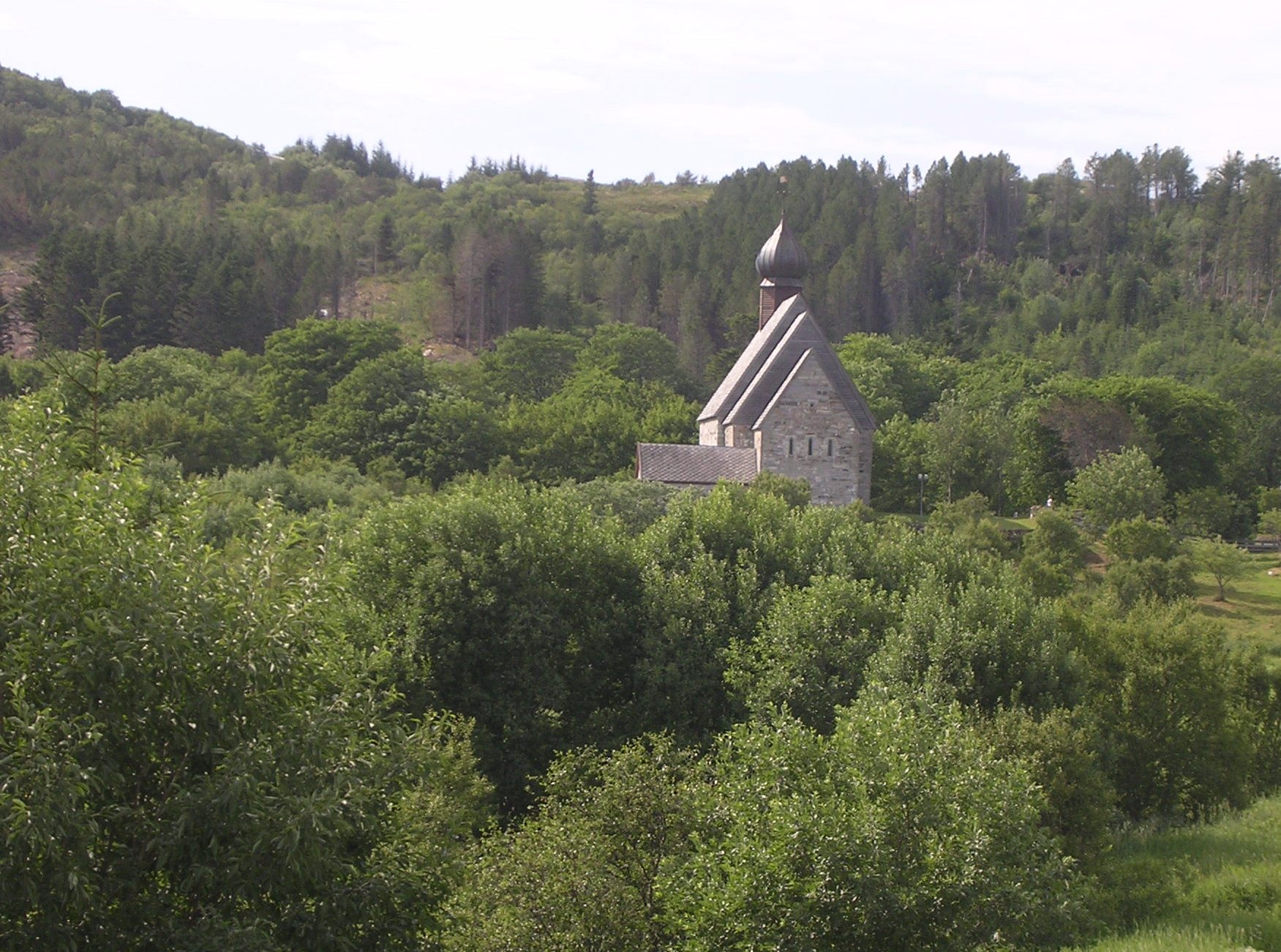
View from a distance

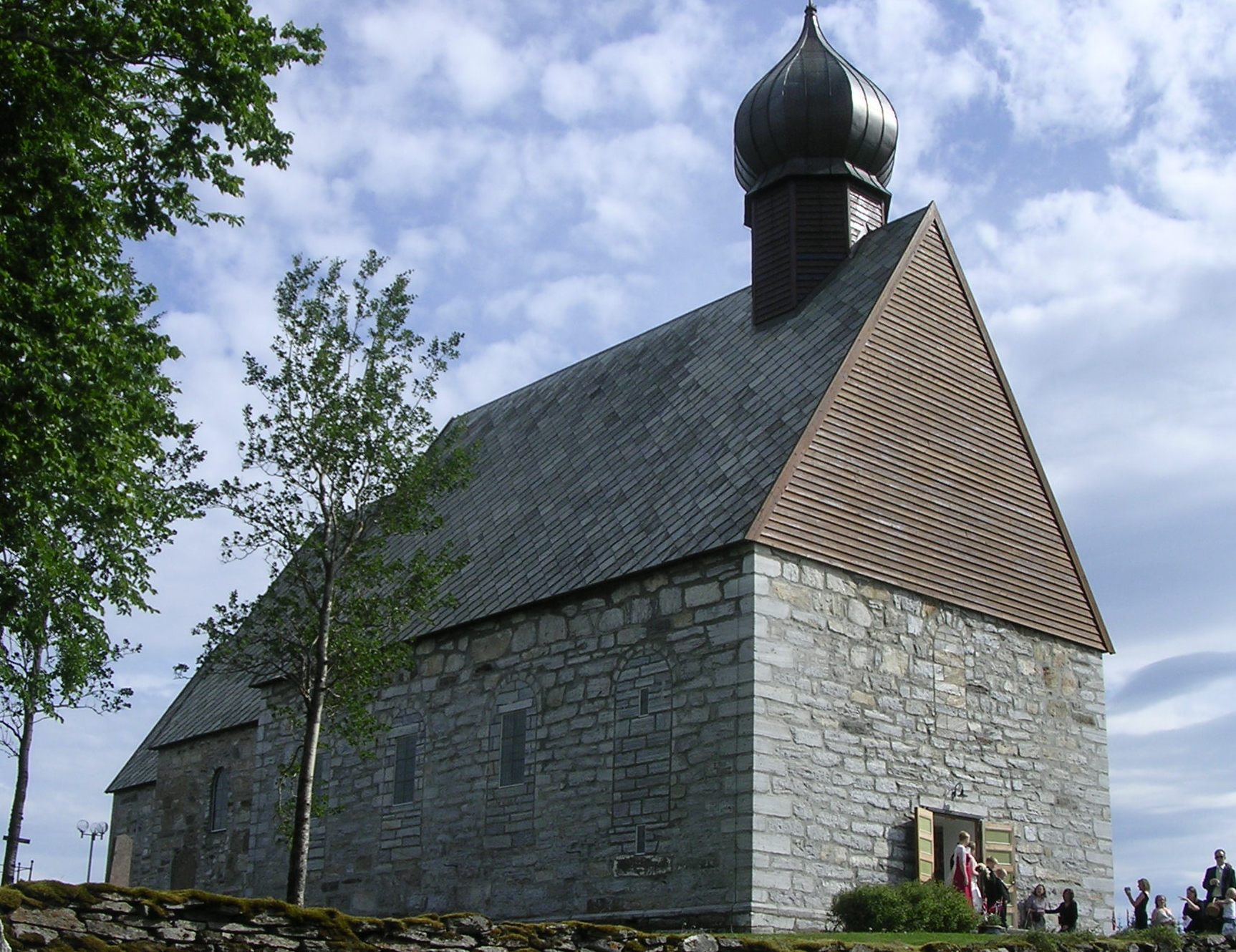
Exterior view

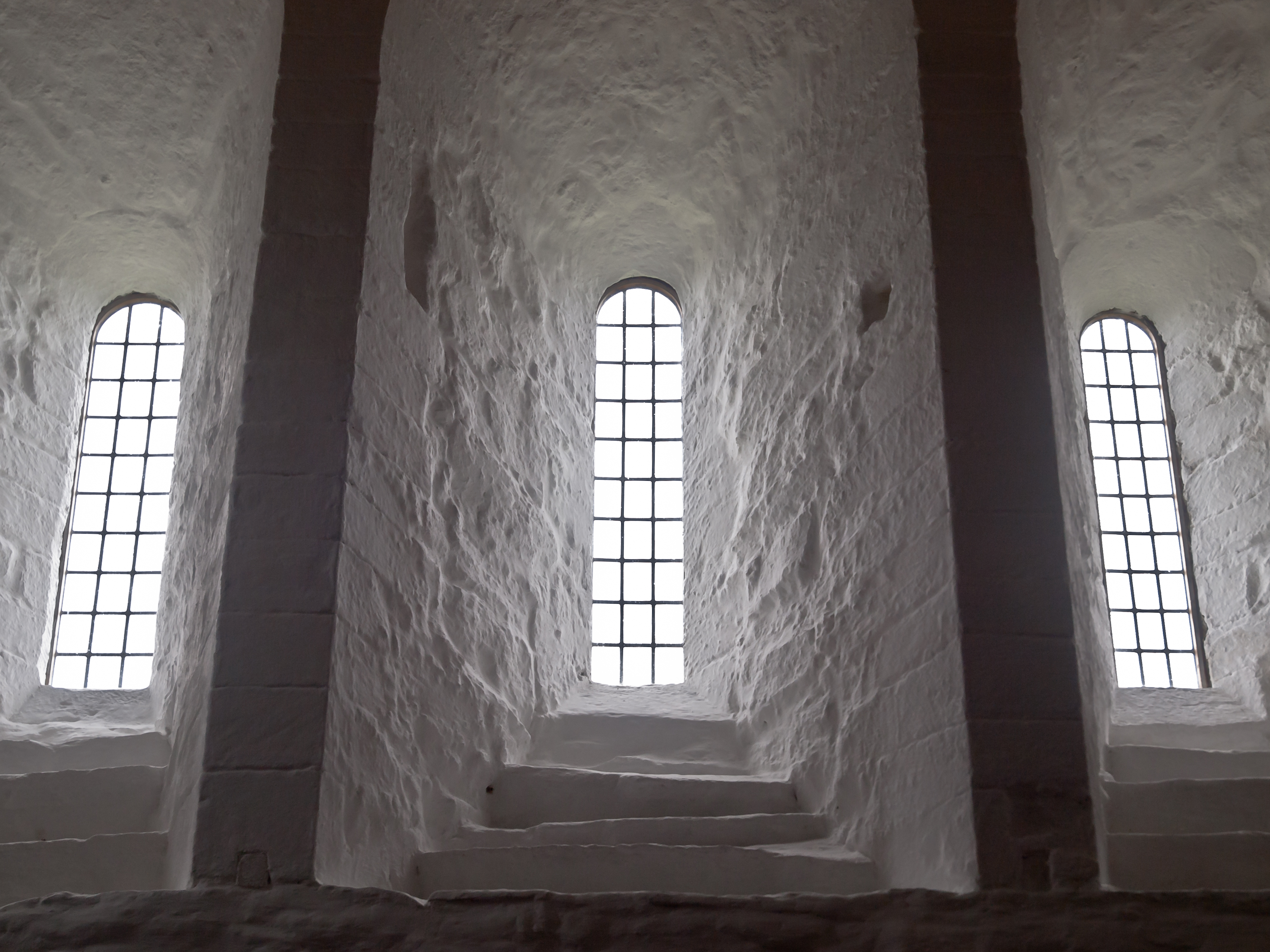
Interior windows

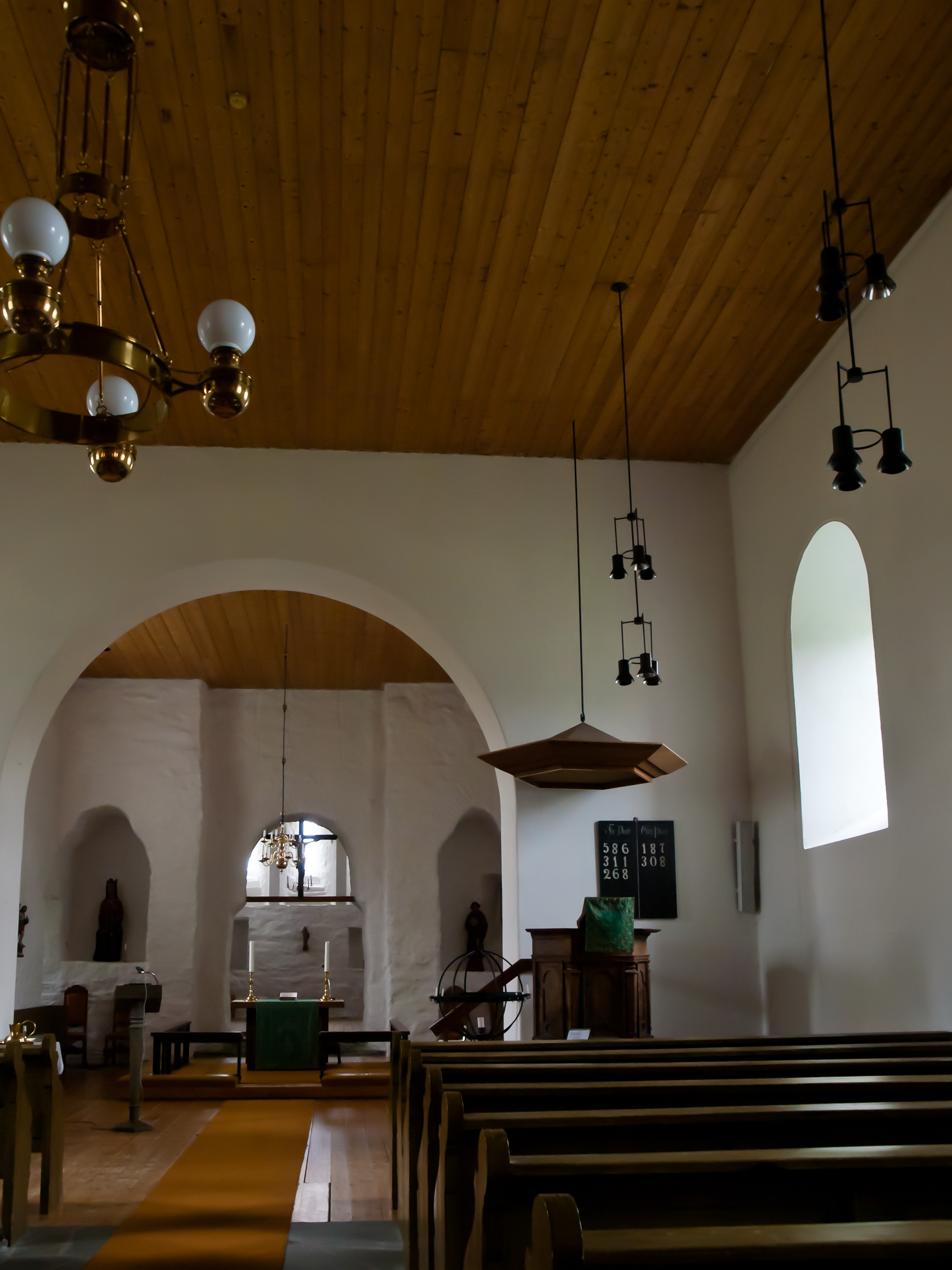
Interior view

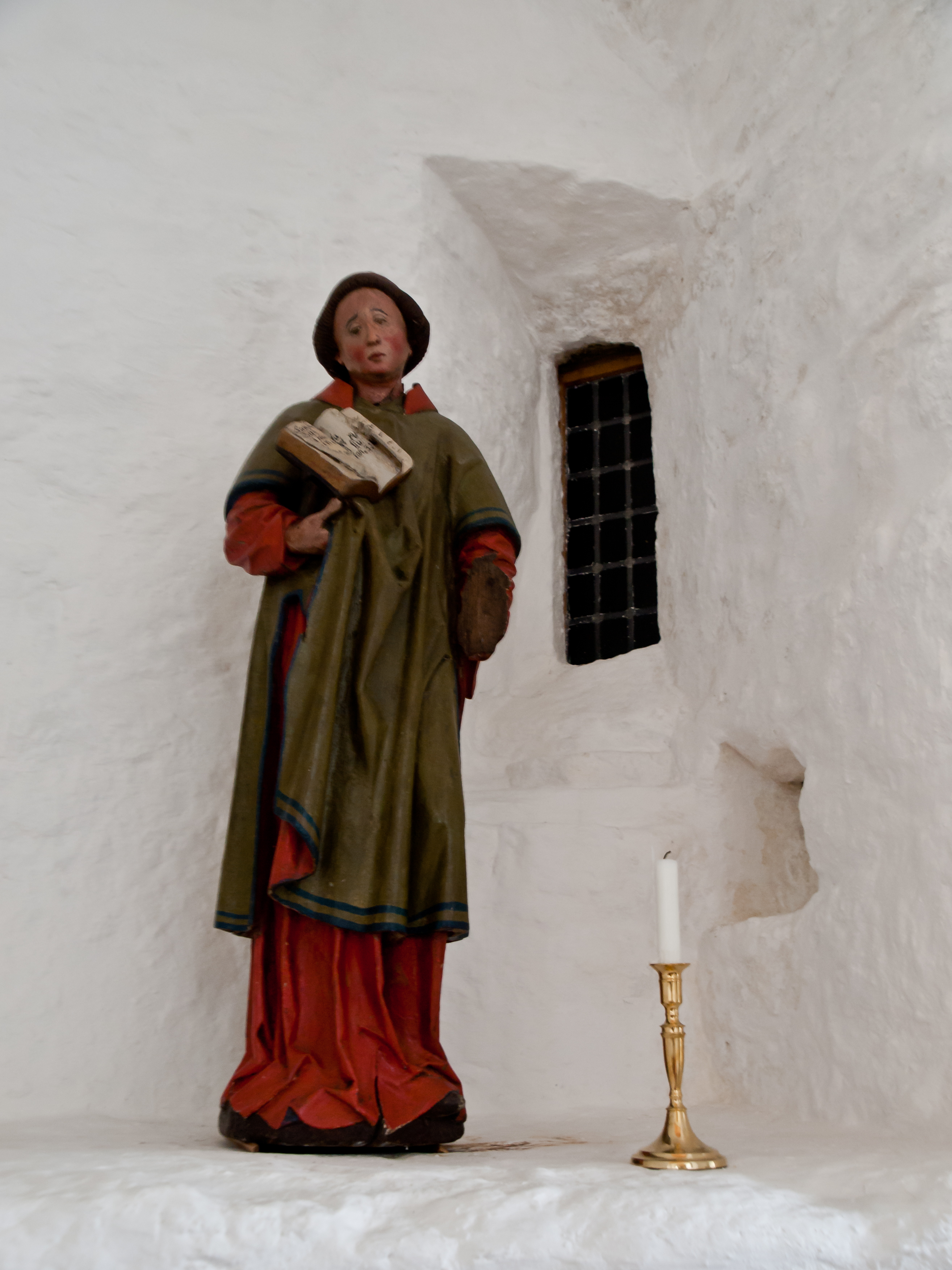
Statue of St Laurentius

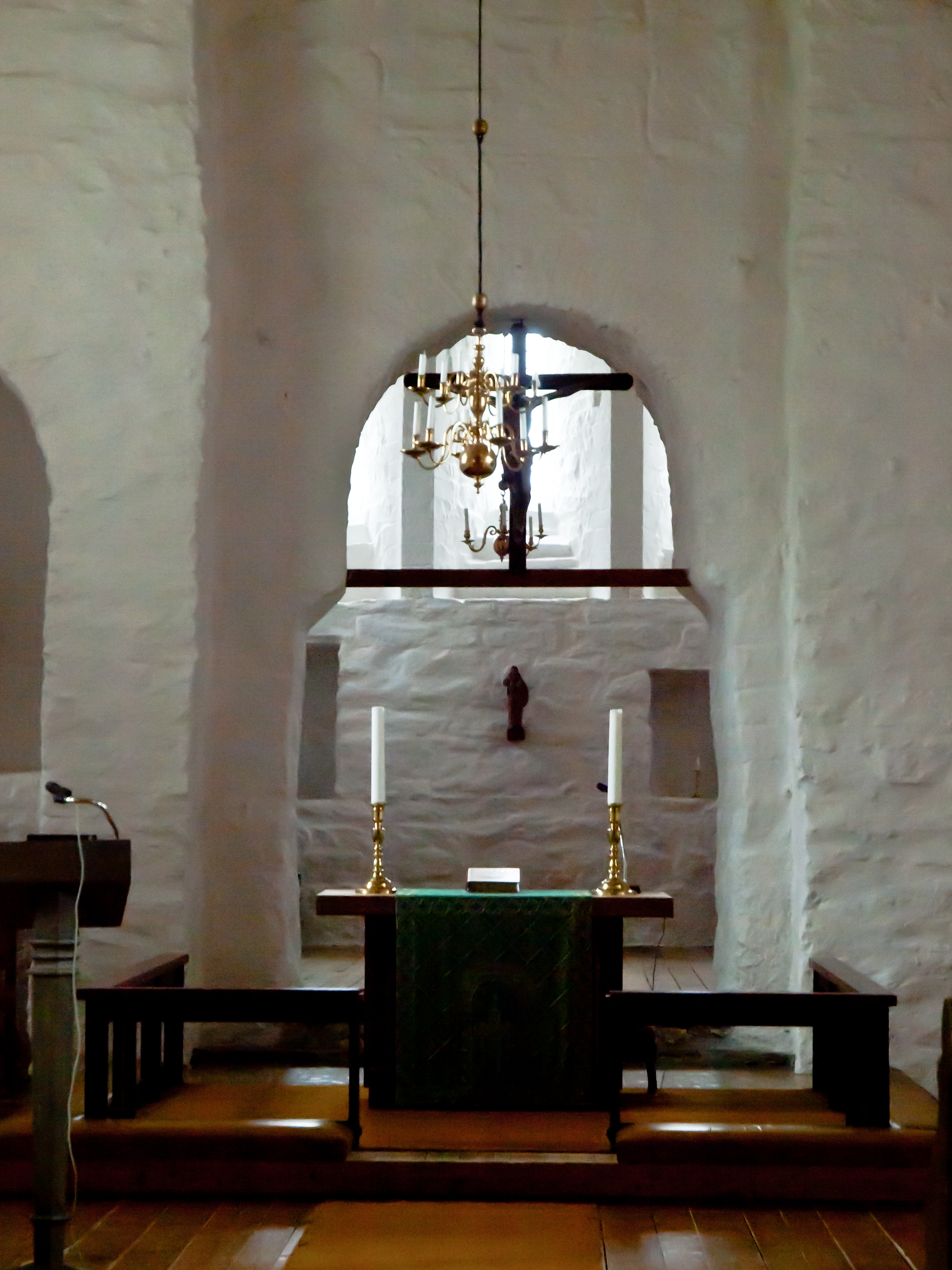
Altar

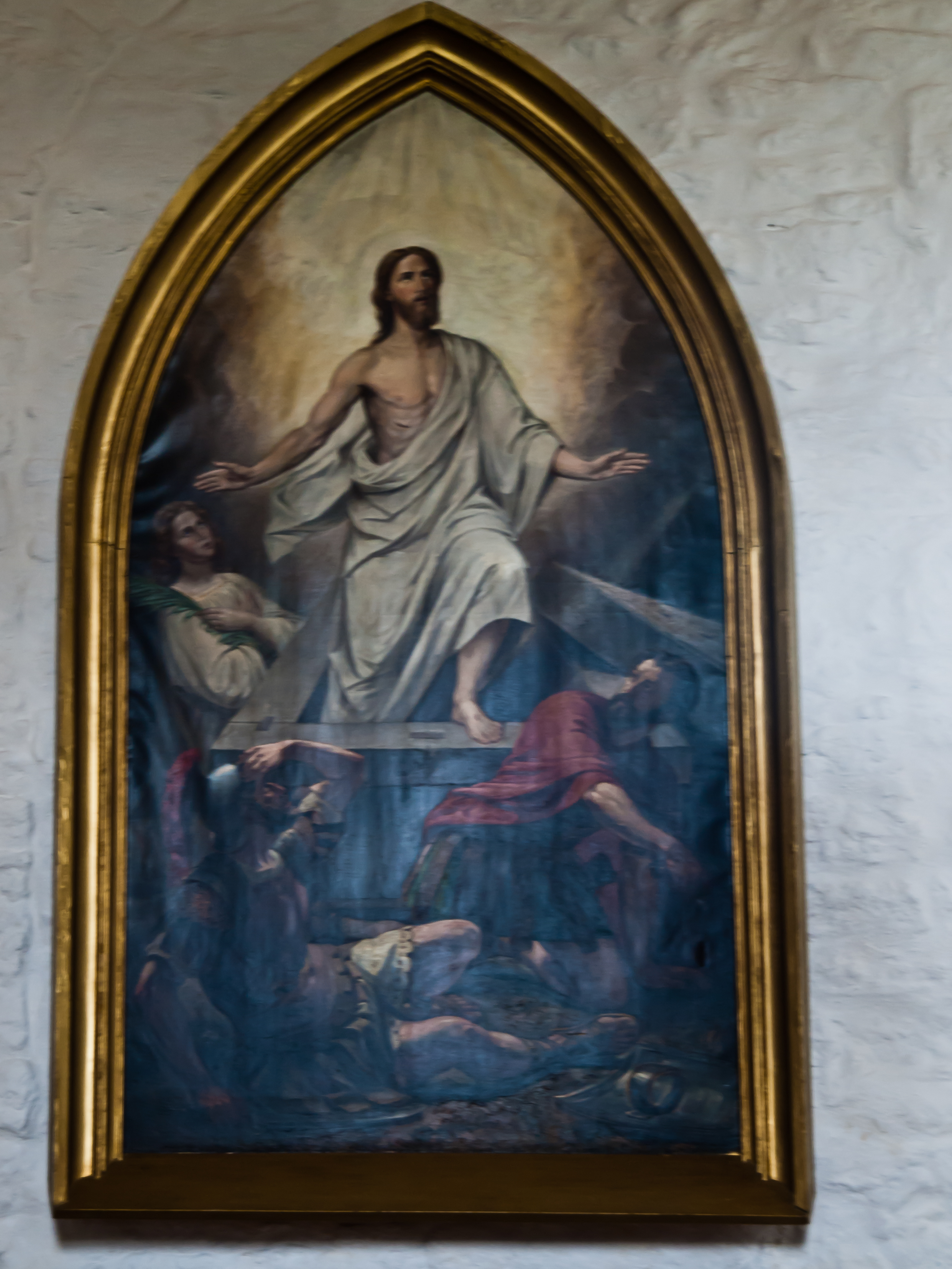
Christ risen

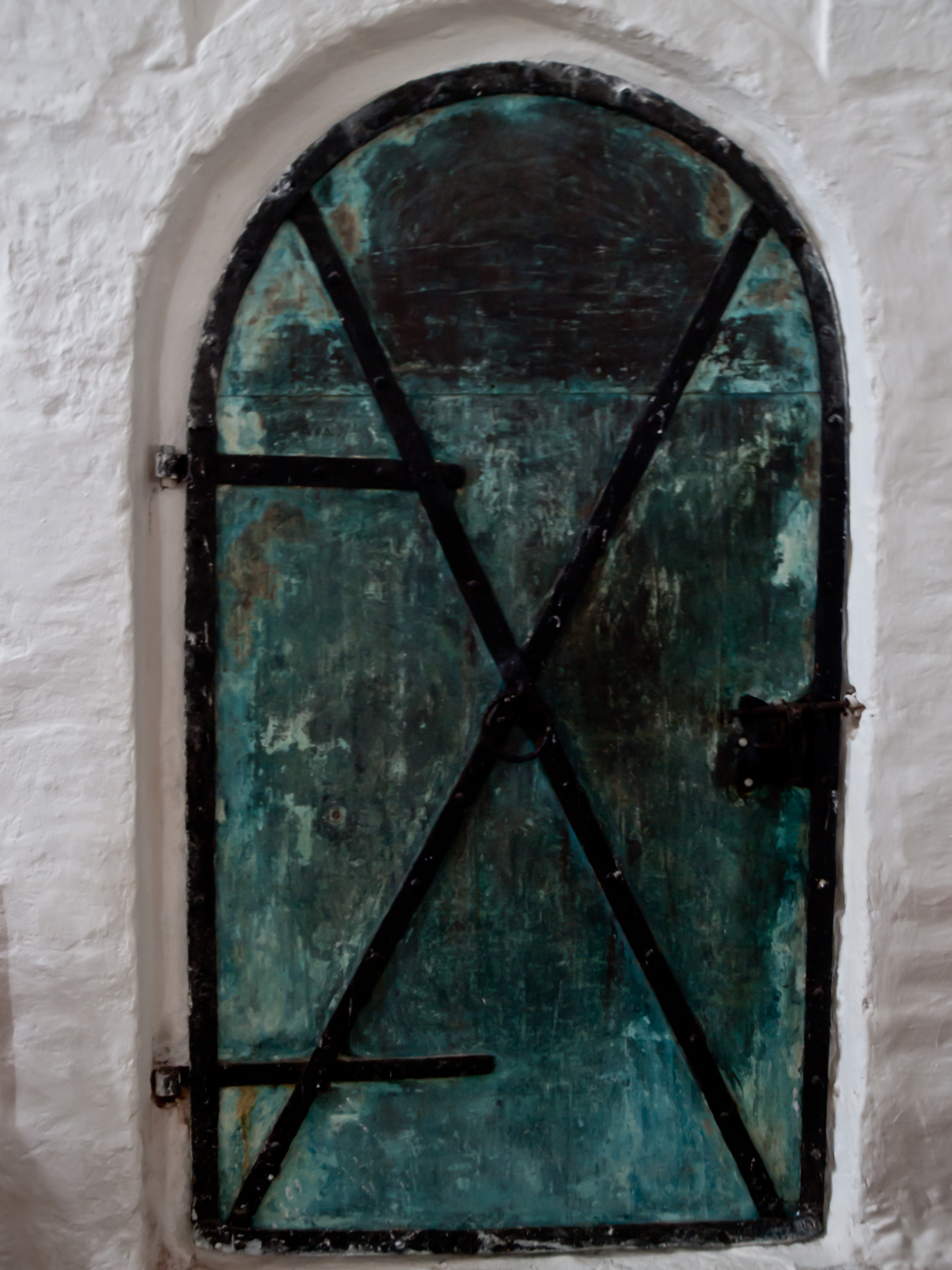
Door to the mausoleum

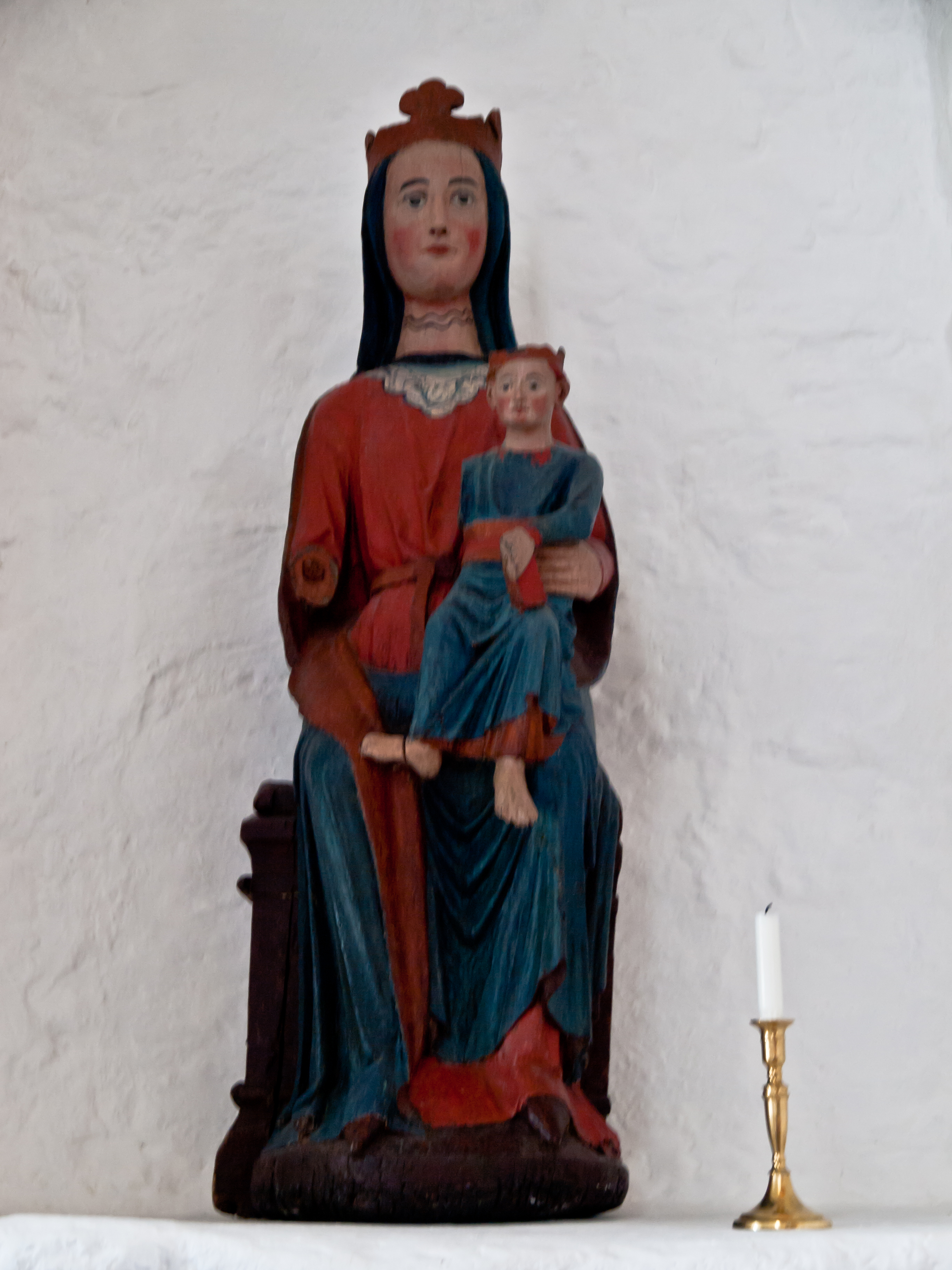
Madonna and child

== See also ==
- List of churches in Sør-Hålogaland
