= Sandåker =

Village in Dønna Municipality, Norway

- Village
- Interactive map of Sandåker
- Location within Nordland Location within Norway
- Coordinates: 66.1490°N 12.7291°E
- Country: Norway
- Region: Northern Norway
- County: Nordland
- District: Helgeland
- Municipality: Dønna Municipality
- Elevation: 14 m (46 ft)
- Time zone: UTC+01:00 (CET)
  - Summer (DST): UTC+02:00 (CEST)
- Post Code: 8813 Kopardal

Sandåker is a village in Dønna Municipality in Nordland county, Norway. It is located on the south-central part of the island of Løkta. It has the postal code 8813 Kopardal, named after the neighboring village of Kopardal, where the local ferry port is located. Historically, the Sandåker area previously belonged to Nesna Municipality, but since 1 January 1962 it has belonged to Dønna Municipality. Løkta Church is located in Sandåker.
