= Axel Coldevin =

Norwegian historian

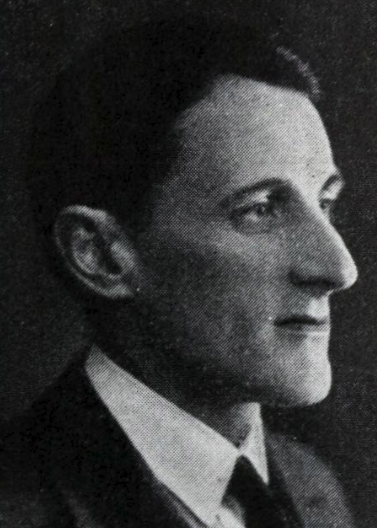
Portrait of Axel Coldevin

Axel Coldevin (4 March 1900 – 23 June 1992) was a Norwegian historian. He was born on the island of Dønna. He is best known for his works on trade and industry in Northern Norway. He was co-editor of the series Vårt folks historie from 1963, and wrote volume five of the series, Enevoldstiden. He was awarded the King's Medal of Merit in 1965, and was a member of the Royal Norwegian Society of Sciences and Letters.
