= Løkta Church =

Church in Nordland, Norway

- Løkta kirke
- Løkta Church
- 66.14890061°N 12.731656283°E
- Location: Dønna Municipality, Nordland
- Country: Norway
- Denomination: Church of Norway
- Churchmanship: Evangelical Lutheran

History
- Former name: Løkta kapell
- Status: Chapel
- Founded: 1968
- Consecrated: 1968

Architecture
- Functional status: Active
- Architectural type: Long church
- Completed: 1968 (58 years ago)

Specifications
- Capacity: 90
- Materials: Wood

Administration
- Diocese: Sør-Hålogaland
- Deanery: Nord-Helgeland prosti
- Parish: Dønna
- Norwegian Cultural Heritage Site
- Type: Church
- Status: Not protected
- ID: 84362

Løkta Church (Norwegian: Løkta kirke) is a chapel of the Church of Norway in Dønna Municipality in Nordland county, Norway. It is located in the village of Sandåker on the island of Løkta. It is an annex chapel in the Dønna parish which is part of the Nord-Helgeland prosti (deanery) in the Diocese of Sør-Hålogaland. The white, wooden chapel was built in a long church style in 1968. The chapel seats about 90 people.

== See also ==
- List of churches in Sør-Hålogaland
