= Hæstad Church =

Church in Nordland, Norway

Hæstad / Hestad Church
- Hæstad / Hestad kirke
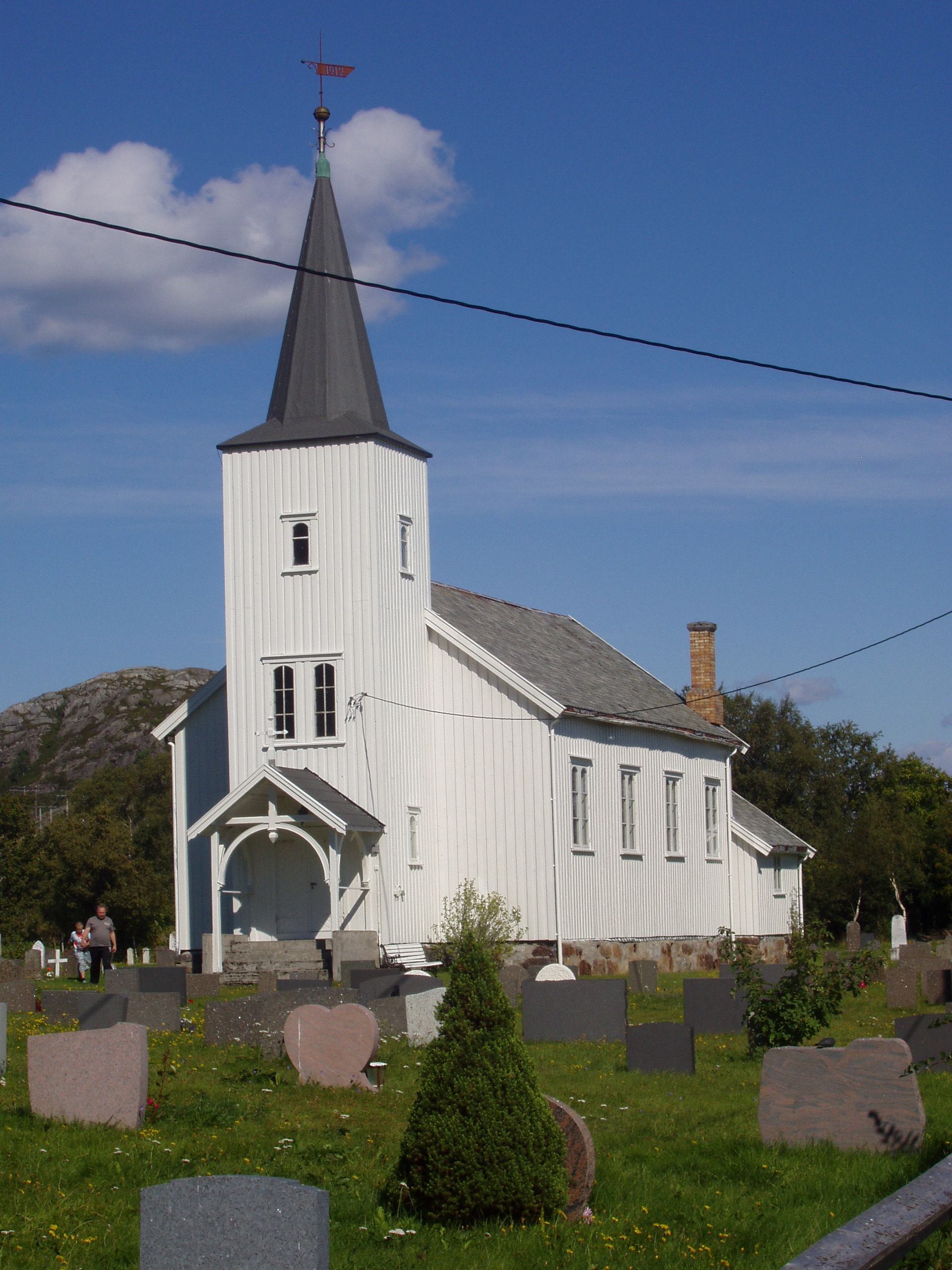
- View of the church
- Hæstad / Hestad Church
- 66.05426598°N 12.517987489°E
- Location: Dønna Municipality, Nordland
- Country: Norway
- Denomination: Church of Norway
- Churchmanship: Evangelical Lutheran

History
- Status: Parish church
- Founded: 1913
- Consecrated: 11 Sept 1913

Architecture
- Functional status: Active
- Architect: Victor Nordan
- Architectural type: Long church
- Completed: 1913 (113 years ago)

Specifications
- Capacity: 220
- Materials: Wood

Administration
- Diocese: Sør-Hålogaland
- Deanery: Nord-Helgeland prosti
- Parish: Dønna
- Norwegian Cultural Heritage Site
- Type: Church
- Status: Listed
- ID: 84690

Hæstad Church (Norwegian: Hæstad kirke) is a parish church of the Church of Norway in Dønna Municipality in Nordland county, Norway. It is located in the village of Hestad on the southern part of the island of Dønna. It is one of the churches for the Dønna parish which is part of the Nord-Helgeland prosti (deanery) in the Diocese of Sør-Hålogaland. The white, wooden church was built in a long church style in 1913 using plans drawn up by the architect Victor Nordan, the son of Jacob Wilhelm Nordan. The church seats about 220 people and it holds worship services at Christmas and some Sundays in the summer. The building was consecrated on 11 September 1913.

== See also ==
- List of churches in Sør-Hålogaland
