= Vandve Church =

Church in Nordland, Norway

- Vandve kirke
- Vandve Church
- 66.15542417°N 12.33054077°E
- Location: Dønna Municipality, Nordland
- Country: Norway
- Denomination: Church of Norway
- Churchmanship: Evangelical Lutheran

History
- Status: Chapel
- Founded: 1956
- Consecrated: 1956

Architecture
- Functional status: Active
- Architect: Arne Reppen
- Architectural type: Rectangular
- Completed: 1956 (70 years ago)

Specifications
- Capacity: 50
- Materials: Wood

Administration
- Diocese: Sør-Hålogaland
- Deanery: Nord-Helgeland prosti
- Parish: Dønna

Vandve Church (Norwegian: Vandve kirke) is a chapel of the Church of Norway in Dønna Municipality in Nordland county, Norway. It is located in the island village of Vandve. It is an annex chapel in the Dønna parish which is part of the Nord-Helgeland prosti (deanery) in the Diocese of Sør-Hålogaland. The white, wooden chapel was built in a rectangular style in 1956 using plans drawn up by the architect Arne Reppen. The chapel seats about 50 people. The church was originally named "Vandve Chapel" until 1980 when it was renamed "Vandve Church".

== See also ==
- List of churches in Sør-Hålogaland
