= Åsværet =

Island group in Nordland, Norway

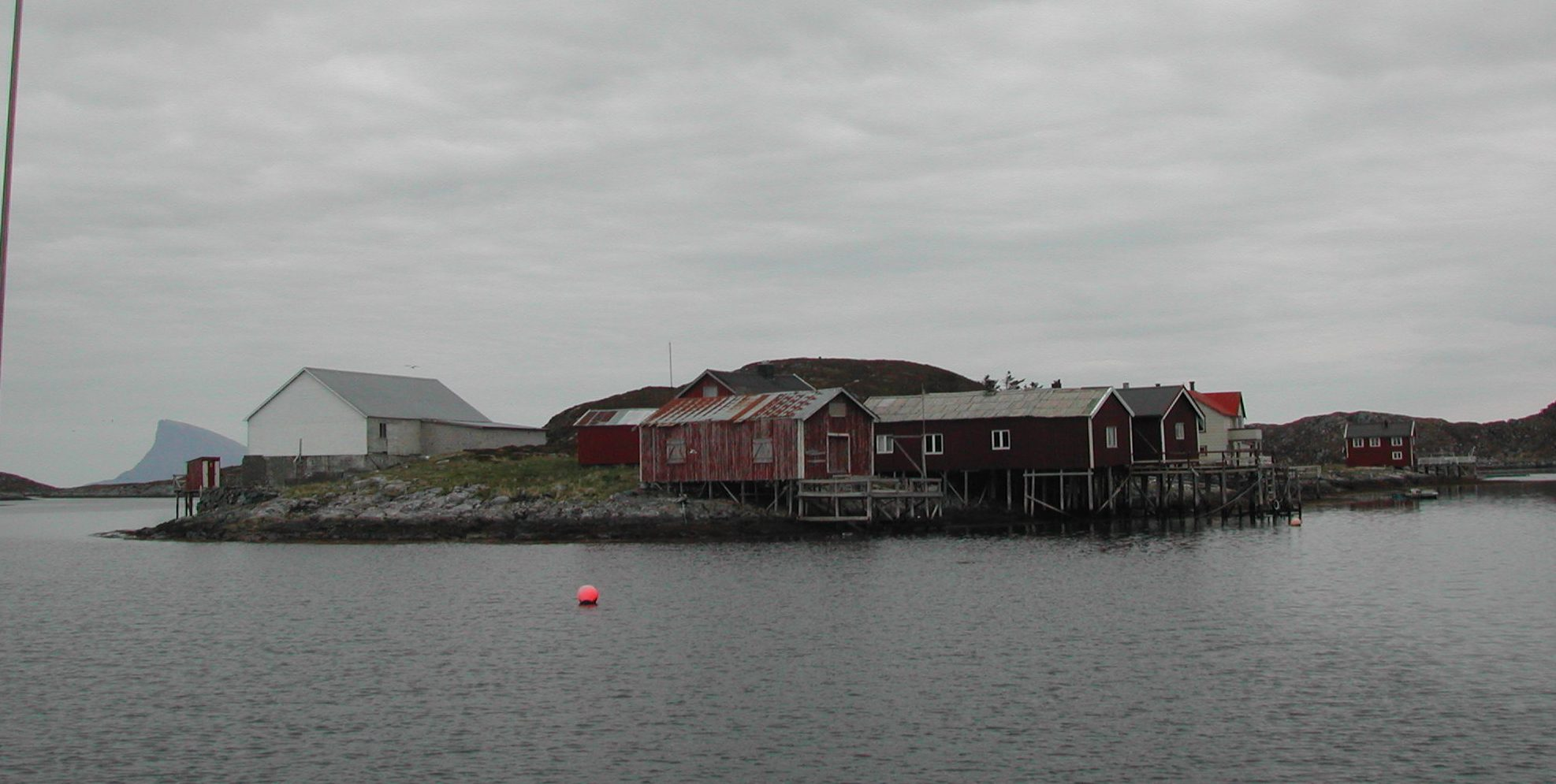
- Interactive map of Åsværet

Geography
- Location: Nordland, Norway
- Coordinates: 66.233796°N 12.219543°E

Administration
- Norway
- County: Nordland
- Municipality: Dønna Municipality

Åsværet is a small group of islands lying on the Arctic Circle in Dønna Municipality in Nordland county, Norway. The islands lie on the south side of the Nordåsværfjord, about 15 kilometres (9.3 mi) south of the island of Lovund and 12 kilometres (7.5 mi) northwest of the island of Dønna. The Åsvær Lighthouse was built here in 1876. The islands are noted for their herring fishery.
