= Hestad (surname) =

Hestad is a surname. Notable people with the surname include:

- Daniel Berg Hestad, Norwegian footballer
- Eirik Hestad, Norwegian footballer
- Harry Hestad, Norwegian footballer and manager
- Monika Hestad, Norwegian industrial designer and researcher
- Stein Olav Hestad, former Norwegian footballer
