= Vandve =

Island in Nordland, Norway

Vandve Vandved
- Interactive map of Vandve; Vandved

Geography
- Location: Nordland, Norway
- Coordinates: 66.1468°N 12.3143°E
- Area: 5.8 km^{2} (2.2 sq mi)
- Length: 6 km (3.7 mi)
- Width: 1.5 km (0.93 mi)
- Highest elevation: 27 m (89 ft)
- Highest point: Mershågjen

Administration
- Norway
- County: Nordland
- Municipality: Dønna Municipality

Demographics
- Population: 32 (2017)

Vandve is an island in Dønna Municipality in Nordland county, Norway. The 5.8-square-kilometre (2.2 sq mi) flat island lies about 5 kilometres (3.1 mi) west of the island of Dønna and about 10 kilometres (6.2 mi) south of the Åsværet islands. Vandve Church is located on the island. There is a regular ferry connection to the nearby island of Dønna. In 2017, there were about 30 residents of the island.

== See also ==
- List of islands of Norway
