= Hestad, Dønna =

Village in Dønna Municipality, Norway

Hestad
- Village
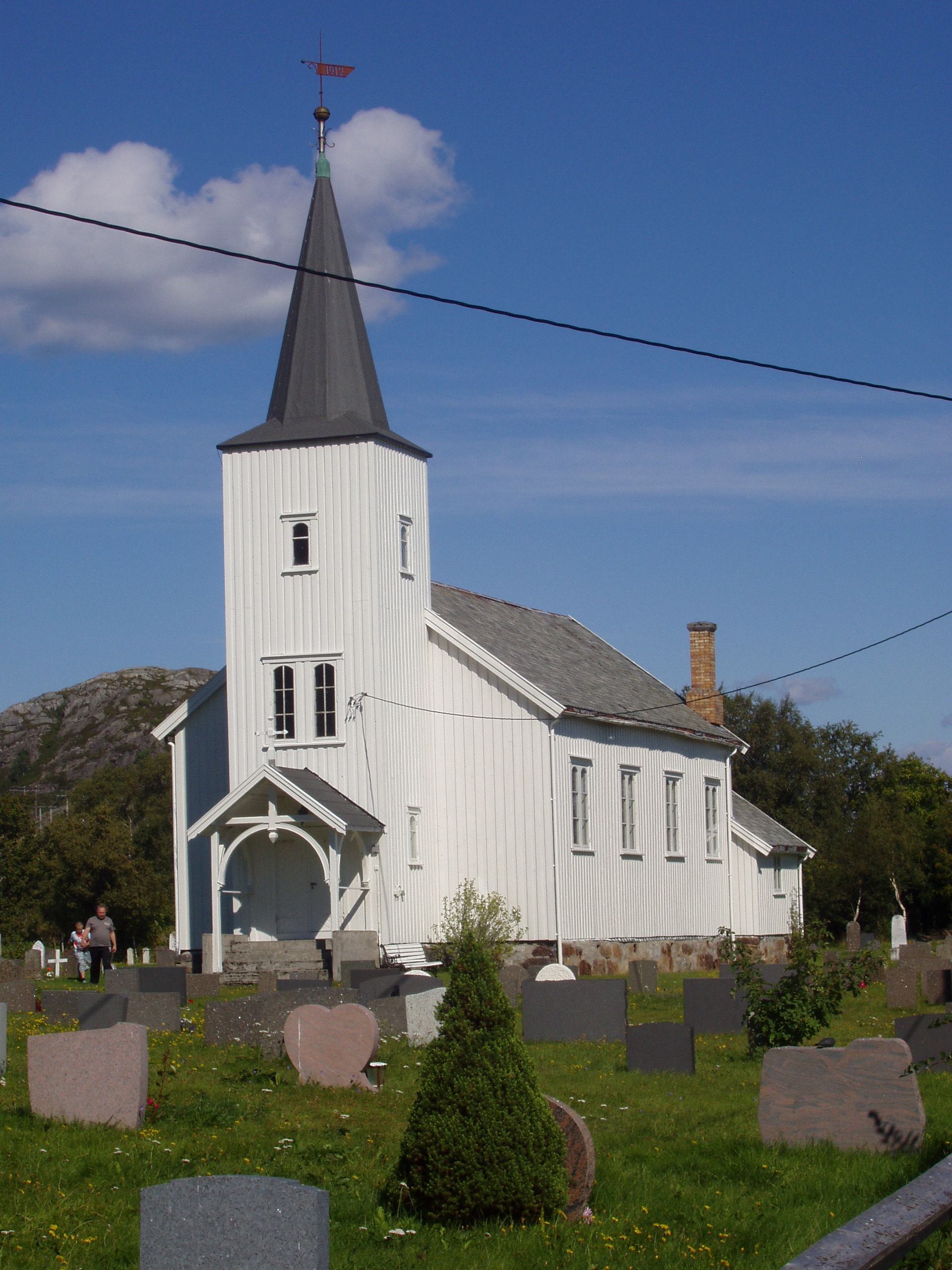
- View of the village church
- Interactive map of Hestad
- Location within Nordland Location within Norway
- Coordinates: 66.0547°N 12.5244°E
- Country: Norway
- Region: Northern Norway
- County: Nordland
- District: Helgeland
- Municipality: Dønna Municipality
- Elevation: 9 m (30 ft)
- Time zone: UTC+01:00 (CET)
  - Summer (DST): UTC+02:00 (CEST)
- Post Code: 8820 Dønna

Hestad is a village in Dønna Municipality in Nordland county, Norway. The village is located on the southern part of the island of Dønna, about 6 kilometres (3.7 mi) northwest of the mainland town of Sandnessjøen. Hæstad Church is located in the village. Norwegian County Road 828 runs through the village along the coast of the island.
