= Løkta =

Island in Nordland, Norway

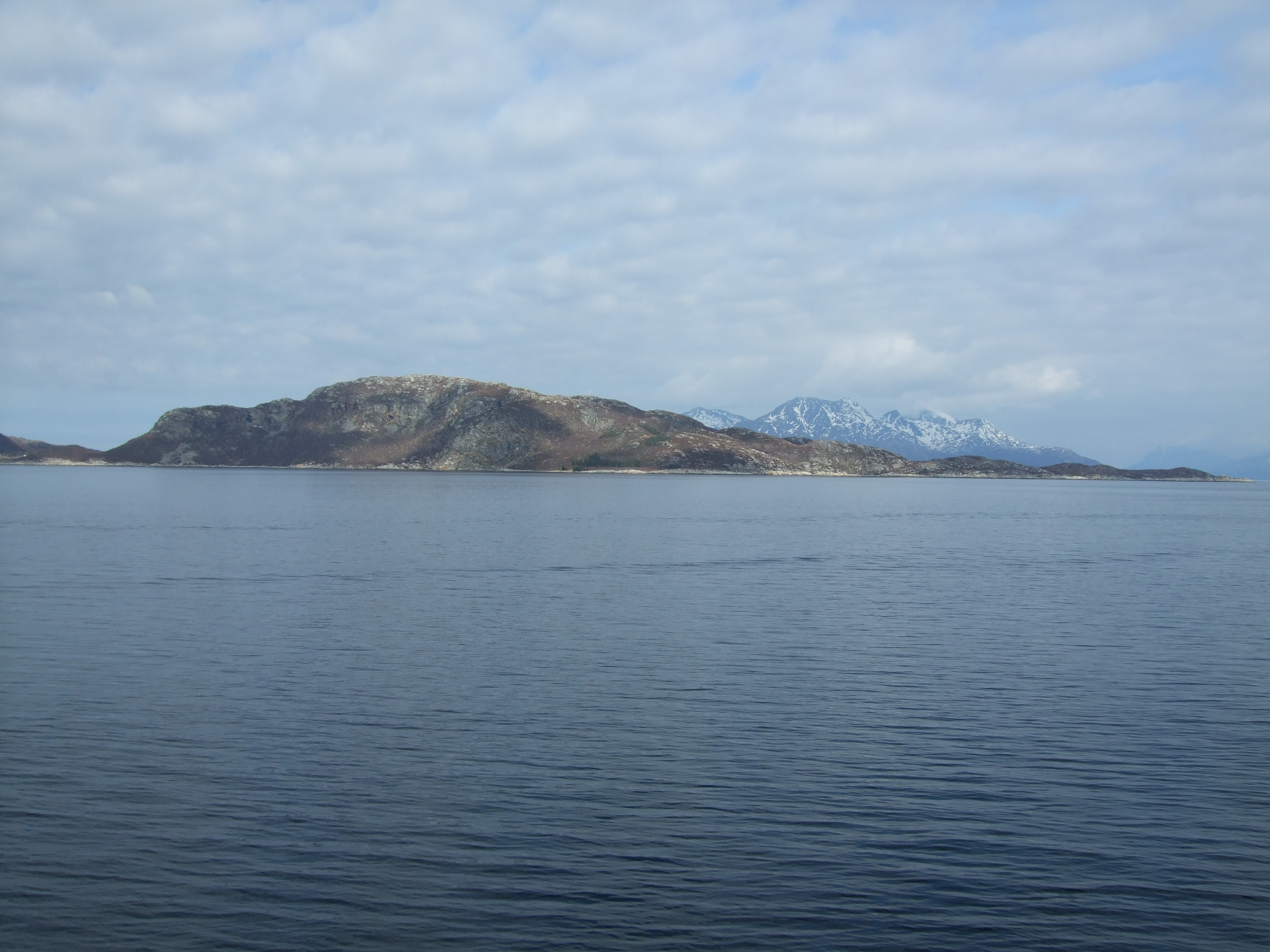
- Interactive map of Løkta

Geography
- Location: Nordland, Norway
- Coordinates: 66.1641°N 12.6935°E
- Area: 17.4 km^{2} (6.7 sq mi)
- Length: 6 km (3.7 mi)
- Width: 5 km (3.1 mi)
- Highest elevation: 238 m (781 ft)
- Highest point: Sandåkerfjellet

Administration
- Norway
- County: Nordland
- Municipality: Dønna Municipality

Demographics
- Population: 135 (2017)

Løkta is an island in Dønna Municipality in Nordland county, Norway. The 17.4-square-kilometre (6.7 sq mi) island is located between the islands of Dønna and Hugla, at the entrance to the Ranfjorden. The village of Sandåker is located on the southern part of the island, just west of the 238-metre (781 ft) tall Sandåkerfjellet. Løkta Church is located on the island. Historically, the western part of the island was a part of the old Dønnes Municipality and the eastern part belonged to Nesna Municipality, but in 1962 all of the island became a part of Dønna Municipality. In 2017, there were 135 residents of the island.

== See also ==
- List of islands of Norway
