= Dønna (island) =

Island in Dønna, Norway

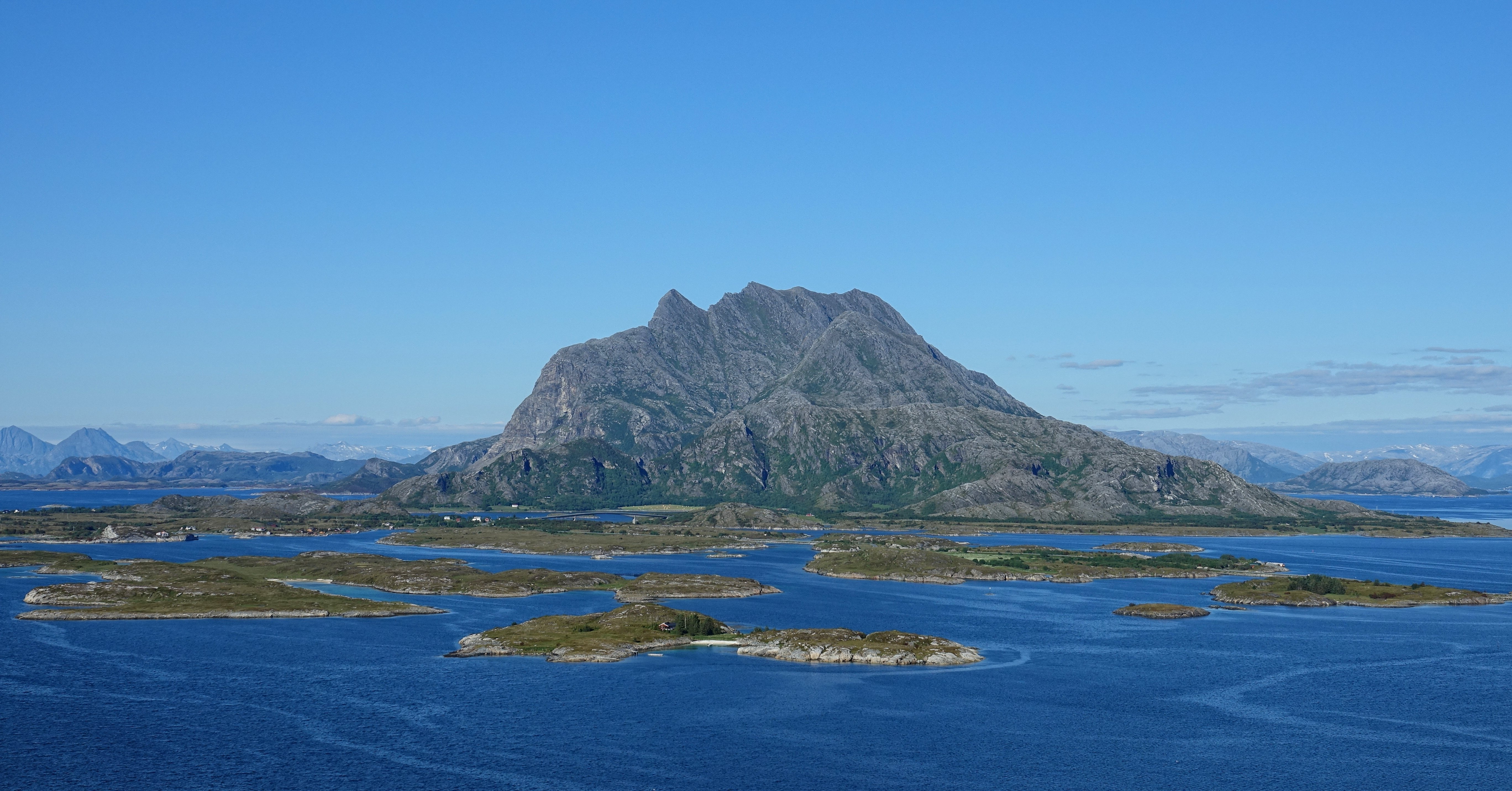
- View of the mountain Dønnamannen
- Interactive map of Dønna

Geography
- Location: Nordland, Norway
- Coordinates: 66.0401°N 12.3940°E
- Area: 138 km^{2} (53 sq mi)
- Length: 26 km (16.2 mi)
- Width: 10 km (6 mi)
- Highest elevation: 858 m (2815 ft)
- Highest point: Dønnamannen

Administration
- Norway
- County: Nordland
- Municipality: Dønna Municipality

Demographics
- Population: 1,235 (2017)
- Pop. density: 8.9/km^{2} (23.1/sq mi)

Dønna is the largest island in Dønna Municipality in Nordland county, Norway. The 138-square-kilometre (53 sq mi) island lies off the west coast of the mainland of Helgeland, Norway. The islands of Løkta and Tomma lie northeast of the island, the islands of Vandve and Åsværet lie to the west, and the islands of Herøy and Alsta lie to the south.

The island is the main island of the municipality where most of the municipal residents live. In 2017, there were about 1,235 residents on the island. The northern and central parts of the island are low and relatively flat, partly marshy which nice coastal beaches. The southern part of Dønna is mountainous with several steep and bare mountains. The highest point on the island was the 858-metre (2,815 ft) tall mountain Dønnamannen in the south part of the island.

The island is only connected to the mainland by ferry connections with the nearby town of Sandnessjøen (and to the neighboring island of Løkta). Dønna is connected to the island of Staulen (in Herøy Municipality) by the Åkviksundet Bridge on the southern tip of the island.

== See also ==
- List of islands of Norway
