= Eckhoff =

Eckhoff is a surname. Notable people with the surname include:

- Albertus Eckhoff (1875–1949), New Zealand cricketer
- Bert Eckhoff (1901–1967), New Zealand rugby league footballer
- Dennis Eckhoff (1945–1995), American football player and coach
- Ditlef Eckhoff (born 1942), Norwegian Jazz musician
- Ernst Fredrik Eckhoff (1905–1997), Norwegian judge
- Hartvig Sverdrup Eckhoff (1855-1928), Norwegian architect
- Johannes Eckhoff (1919–2007), Norwegian actor
- Lawrence Eckhoff (born 1952), New Zealand cricketer
- Mathias Eckhoff (1925-?), Norwegian businessman
- Niels Stockfleth Darre Eckhoff (1831–1914), Norwegian architect
- Stian Eckhoff (born 1979), Norwegian biathlete
- Tias Eckhoff (1926–2016), Norwegian industrial designer
- Tiril Eckhoff (born 1990), Norwegian biathlete
- Tor Eckhoff (1964-2021), Norwegian YouTuber
- Torstein Eckhoff (1916–1993), Norwegian civil servant and law professor
