= Ernst Fredrik Eckhoff =

Norwegian judge (1905–1997)

Ernst Fredrik Eckhoff (28 April 1905 – 14 September 1997) was a Norwegian judge.

He was born in 1905 as a son of jurist Nicolay Kristian Schreuder Eckhoff (1870–1955). He was a second cousin of legal academic Torstein Eckhoff, designer Tias Eckhoff and actor Johannes Eckhoff, and a grandnephew of architect Niels Stockfleth Darre Eckhoff. He was also a first cousin of Anders Lange. He lived in Kristiansand.

During the occupation of Norway by Nazi Germany, he was a member of Milorg. He was arrested by the Nazi authorities in December 1942, and was incarcerated at Grini from 28 June 1943 to the liberation of Norway on 8 May 1945. After the liberation he was appointed Supreme Court Justice. In 1945 he was also appointed member of the commission Undersøkelseskommisjonen av 1945. This was a commission appointed by the Parliament of Norway in 1945 to investigate the role of the three branches of government in 1940: the Norwegian Parliament, Government and Supreme Court, as well as the Administrative Council which was established after the German occupation of Norway in 1940. The chair of the commission was Gustav Adolf Lammers Heiberg and the other members were Ernst Fredrik Eckhoff, Arnold Holmboe, Ole Hallesby, Nils Nilsen Thune, Arne Bergsgård and Sverre Steen. The secretary of the commission was Helge Sivertsen.

Eckhoff continued as a Supreme Court Justice until retiring in 1975. In the 1980s he was a member of the board of Scandinavian Airlines System. He died on 14 September 1997.
