= Nils Nilsen Thune =

Norwegian jurist and civil servant

Nils Nilsen Thune (27 May 1880 – 28 May 1950) was a Norwegian jurist and civil servant.

He was born in Vang Municipality in Oppland county, and was a son of Nils Trondsen Thune. He graduated with the cand.jur. degree in 1902. He was hired in the Trondhjem police in 1911, and became police inspector in the city in 1916 and an assessor in 1920. In 1924 he was appointed as the district stipendiary magistrate in Inderøy Municipality. During these years he was a member of the municipal councils of both Trondheim Municipality and Steinkjer Municipality. In 1933 he became district stipendiary magistrate of Eiker Municipality, Modum Municipality, and Sigdal Municipality, and in 1945 he became acting County Governor of Buskerud, and he got the position on a permanent basis in 1946.

In 1945 he was also named as a member of the commission Undersøkelseskommisjonen av 1945 that scrutinized the actions of the Norwegian government in 1940. The other commission members were Gustav Adolf Lammers Heiberg, Arnold Holmboe, Ole Hallesby, Ernst Fredrik Eckhoff, Arne Bergsgård and Sverre Steen, and the secretary was Helge Sivertsen. The background for the commission was the German invasion of Norway on 9 April 1940, and the question was raised whether Norway could have avoided it through a different foreign and security policy. Second, the actions of Norwegian authorities between 9 April and 25 September 1940 were investigated, both regarding the three branches of government (Parliament, Government, Supreme Court) that eventually laid down their offices, but also the transition authority (the Administrative Council) as well as other relevant civil and military bodies.

In April 1950 it was decided that he retire from his position on 1 October the same year. However, he died on Drammen Hospital on 28 May 1950, having suffered a heart problem during the funeral of his brother Helge Nilsen Thune three days before.

Political offices
Preceded by Jens Hundseid	County Governor of Buskerud; 1945–1950	Succeeded by Arnold G. Dybsjord
