= Gustav Adolf Lammers Heiberg =

Norwegian barrister and politician

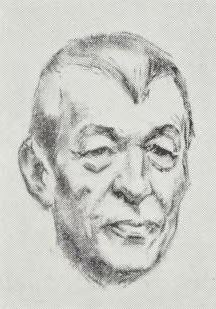
Gustav Adolf Lammers Heiberg

Gustav Adolf Lammers Heiberg (22 April 1875 – 1948) was a Norwegian barrister and politician for the Labour Party.

== Personal life ==
He was born in Kristiania as a son of barrister Anton Vilhelm Heiberg (1831–1885) and his wife Antonie Magdalene Fossum. He was a first cousin of Eivind, Jacob, Gunnar and Inge Heiberg and a first cousin once removed of Hans Heiberg. His sister Engel was married to physician Edvard Heiberg Hansteen.

Gustav Heiberg married twice. His first marriage, to Signe Konow, lasted from April 1904 to her death in April 1920. In 1921 he married Etty Roll, from Molde, a daughter of Ferdinand Nicolai Roll and sister of Nini Roll Anker. They settled in Vestre Aker.

== Career ==
Heiberg enrolled as a student in 1894 and graduated with the cand.jur. degree in 1897. He chaired Norwegian Students' Society from 1901 to 1902. After some years as a junior employee in a lawyer's office, he opened his own lawyer's office in Kristiania in 1902. From 1903 he was entitled to work with Supreme Court cases.

Heiberg was a member of the Labour Party since 1898, and served as a member of the executive committee of the municipal council of Kristiania from 1911 to 1919. Here, he was especially preoccupied with improving housing conditions in the city. He stood for parliamentary election in 1912, but was not elected. When the radical wing assumed control of the party at the 1918 national convention, he became tired from the ensuing disagreements in his party, and left politics to pursue his professional career.

In 1921 he was hired as city lawyer. He was involved in several high-profile cases, notably as a defender during the Impeachment trial of Abraham Berge in 1926 and 1927. Berge was a former Prime Minister, and his cabinet members Odd S. Klingenberg, Christian F. Michelet, Cornelius Middelthon, Johan H. Rye Holmboe, Anders Venger and Karl Wilhelm Wefring also stood for trial. They were not convicted. This has been the last impeachment trial in Norway.

During the German occupation of Norway, Heiberg was incarcerated at Grini as a "hostage", from 14 April 1942 to 22 October 1942. In 1945 Heiberg was named as chairman of the commission Undersøkelseskommisjonen av 1945 that scrutinized the actions of the Norwegian government in 1940. The other commission members were Arnold Holmboe, Ole Hallesby, Ernst Fredrik Eckhoff, Nils Nilsen Thune, Arne Bergsgård and Sverre Steen, and the secretary was Helge Sivertsen. The background for the commission was the German invasion of Norway on 9 April 1940, and the question was raised whether Norway could have avoided it through a different foreign and security policy. Second, the actions of Norwegian authorities between 9 April and 25 September 1940 were investigated, both regarding the three branches of government (Parliament, Government, Supreme Court) that eventually laid down their offices, but also the Administrative Council as well as other relevant civil and military bodies.

Heiberg was also a founder of Folketeaterbevegelsen in 1929, together with Sverre Iversen, Fernanda Nissen and Kyrre Grepp, whose goal was to draw "broad masses of laborers and functionaries" into the theatre audience, as well as to establish a people's theatre. Folketeatret was finally established in 1952. Heiberg did not live to see this as he died in 1948.
