= Albertus (given name) =

Albertus is a given name. Notable people with the name include:

Latinized names

- Aldberht or Albertus (died between 781 and 786), Bishop of Hereford
- Albertus Parisiensis (died 1177), French cantor and composer
- Albertus de Pisa (died 1240), Italian Franciscan friar
- Albertus Stadensis (c.1187–c.1265), German Benedictine chronicler
- Albertus Magnus (circa 1200–1280), German Dominican friar and bishop
- Albertus de Saxonia (c.1320–1390), German philosopher
- Albertus Pictor (c.1440-c.1507), Swedish painter
- Albertus de Brudzewo (c.1445–c.1497), Polish astronomer, mathematician, philosopher and diplomat

Birth names

- Albertus Gerardus "Gerard" Bilders (1838–1865), Dutch landscape painter
- Albertus Boom (born 1938), Dutch cyclist
- Albertus Jonas Brandt (1787–1821), Dutch still-life painter
- Albertus Theodore Briggs (1862–1937), American Methodist minister
- Albertus Brondgeest (1786–1849), Dutch art trader, drawer and landscape painter
- Albertus Bryne (circa 1621–1668), English organist and composer
- Albertus Carpentier Alting (born 1954), Netherlands Antilles luger and bobsledder
- Albertus W. Catlin (1868–1933), US Marine Corps brigadier general and Medal of Honor recipient
- Albertus Clouwet (1636–1679), Flemish engraver
- Albertus Jacobus Duymaer van Twist (1809–1887), Governor-General of the Dutch East Indies
- Albertus Eckhoff (1875–1949), New Zealand cricketer
- Albertus Geldermans (1935–2025), Dutch racing cyclist
- Albertus Klijn (1923–2012), Dutch biblical scholar
- Albertus Morton (c.1584–1625), English diplomat and Secretary of State
- Albertus van Naamen van Eemnes (1828–1902), Dutch politician and lawyer
- Albertus Antonie Nijland (1868–1936), Dutch astronomer
- Albertus Perk (1887–1919), Dutch fencer
- Albertus van Raalte (1811–1876), Dutch-born pastor of the Reformed Church of America
- Albertus John Rooks (1869–1958), American college president
- Albertus Seba (1665–1736), Dutch pharmacist, zoologist and collector
- Albertus Willem Sijthoff (1829–1913), prominent Dutch publisher
- Albertus Soegijapranata (1896–1963), first Indonesian native Roman Catholic archbishop
- Albertus Susanto Njoto (born 1976), Hong Kong badminton player
- Albertus Swanepoel (born 1959), South African fashion designer
- Albertus Van Loon, Dutch settler and owner of the Albertus Van Loon House
- Albertus Wielsma (1883–1968), Dutch rower
- Albertus Henricus Wiese (1761–1810), Governor-General of the Dutch East Indies

== See also ==
- Albert (given name)
