= Barbie Basics =

Line of collector's edition Barbie dolls

The Barbie Basics is a line of collector's edition Barbie dolls. They were created by Mattel designer Bill Greening and were introduced in late 2009 to be officially released in the spring of 2010.

As their name suggests, the dolls are dressed in "basic" clothing that women usually have in their closets. The debut collection featured the best-known fashion staple: the little black dress.

== Description ==
The dolls have the so-called collector-only ModelMuse body sculpt (which is thinner than most Barbie bodies and has impressive details including neck and collarbone sculpting). The posing of the arms varies from doll to doll and some have different stances. All the dolls also have differing head molds, skin tones and ethnicities. The male dolls introduced in Collection 002 feature the MaleMuse body created for the Twilight Edward Cullen doll in 2009. In Collection 002.5, female Basics dolls featured an articulated ModelMuse body.

The dolls are part of the Black Label collection which, unlike some Barbie lines, is for adult collectors only (the minimum age limit is 14).

The first collection (Collection 001) featured 12 dolls wearing different little black dresses and 4 accessory packs (which were sold separately). The second wave of the collection (called Collection 001.5) only featured 4 dolls (though one of them featured a new face sculpt) and showcased little black dresses with pink ribbon accents, along with another 2 new accessory packs. The third wave (Collection Red) was a Target store exclusive which featured 3 dolls wearing little red dresses and a new accessory pack.

Collection 002 debuted in the spring of 2011. In the collection, there are 12 dolls (9 Barbies and 3 Kens) and the theme is jeans and T-shirts. Collection 002.5 was announced to collectors in February 2011 and featured three dolls and two accessory sets. These dolls feature an articulated body, a first for the Basics line. The dolls are dressed in jeans with metallic-finish blouses and earrings. A second version of Collection Red (called 'Collection Red 2') was released with 1 new accessory pack and 3 dolls wearing red shirts and white jeans.

Collection 003, the third and final collection, debuted in the spring of 2012. There are 6 dolls and 2 new accessory packs and the theme is colorful swimsuits.

== The dolls ==
The Barbie Basics dolls from Collection 001. From left to right: Models No. 03, 08, 05, 02, 12, 01, 11, 07, 04, 06, 09 and 10.

The featured dolls do not have names, but are numbered instead. Each of the dolls has a different head mold (corresponding to their model number). Some of the molds are popularly used in the Barbie Collector line. Mattel's head molds are usually, but not always, named after the doll/character/line in which they debuted.

- "Model No. 1" has pale skin and bleached blond hair in Collection 001, Collection Red and Collection Red 2. She then appeared as a raven-haired brunette in Collection 001.5. She also reappeared in Collection 002 with sandy blond hair and a tanner skin tone. She uses the Mackie head mold (which was exclusively created for Bob Mackie's limited-edition Barbie dolls since 1991). Her head mold is by far the most popular of all the molds in the line and has been frequently used for the character of Barbie for both the main and collector lines since its creation.
- "Model No. 2" has peach skin and long chestnut brown hair in Collection 001. She reappears in Collection 002 with the same overall look but with shorter hair. She becomes an African-American doll in Collection Red 2 with light-brown curly hair. She is totally revamped in Collection 003, where she has wine-red hair and the same skin tone as in Collection 001. She uses the Lara head mold, which is frequently used for the collector line's designer Barbie dolls (e.g. the Versace, Vera Wang, Juicy Couture, and Diane von Fürstenberg dolls). The head mold was named after Lara, one of Barbie's friends from the Generation Girl line back in 1999.
- "Model No. 3" has peach skin and long auburn hair in Collection 001 and Collection Red. She then appeared with curly red hair in Collection 001.5. In Collection 002, her whole look is revamped and she has pale skin and curly blond hair. In Collection Red 2, she has long black hair in a ponytail. She uses the Steffie head mold which is, by far, the oldest face sculpt in the line. It was first used for Barbie's friend Steffie back in 1971 (thus gaining its name). Other notable characters who used the head mold are Whitney, PJ, Midge and Summer.
- "Model No. 4" has cropped curly black hair and has the darkest skin tone in Collection 001. She is totally revamped in Collection 002, where she has tan skin and long red hair. She is featured in Collection 002.5, with a light tan skin tone and dark brown hair. She is, again, revamped in Collection 003, where she has tan skin and long golden-blond hair. She uses the Goddess (a.k.a. Angel) head mold which was first used on the Fantasy Goddess of Africa doll from the Bob Mackie International Beauty Collection in 1999 and for the Classical Goddess line of dolls in 2000.
- "Model No. 5" is an East Asian doll with long black hair in Collection 001 and Collection 002 (she sported bangs in the latter collection). She is featured with the same look in Collection 003, though donning a short bob. She uses the Kayla/Lea head mold, which was named after two of Barbie's friends of the same name. This popular head mold has been frequently used for Barbie's ethnic Asian friends in the main line as well as for several Asian-themed dolls in the collector line.
- "Model No. 6" has tan skin and long golden-blond hair in both Collection 001 and Collection 001.5. Her head mold was first used for the LeAnn Rimes doll in 2003 and for the David's Bridal Eternal doll in 2004. Despite this, the head mold is named Carnaval after the 2006 Carnaval Barbie doll from the Dolls of the World line. Mattel calls it the BeBe sculpt.
- "Model No. 7" has peach skin and long ginger hair in Collection 001. She reappeared in Collection 002 with warm brown hair and the same skin tone. She is totally revamped in Collection 003 where she has pale skin and platinum-blond hair. She uses the Aphrodite head mold which was first used for the 2009 Aphrodite Barbie doll (though the head mold is sometimes called the Kentucky, since it was used for the Kentucky Derby Barbie doll, released a bit earlier than the Aphrodite). The head mold was, allegedly, made from the Mackie face (upper part) and the Lara face (lips).
- "Model No. 8" is an African-American doll with long light-brown hair in Collection 001 and Collection Red (she sported a short Afro in the latter collection). She also appears in Collection 002 with the same overall look, but with a shorter haircut. She is again featured in Collection 002.5 donning long coppery brown hair and the same skin tone. In Collection 003, she sports a dark Afro and a slightly darker skin tone compared to her previous versions. She uses the Mbili head mold. Mbili was the name of the second doll in a series of collector's edition African-American dolls created by Byron Lars. The head mold is also currently used for Mattel's So In Style Grace, Trichelle, Kara, Marisa and Chandra dolls.
- "Model No. 9" has pale skin and a short platinum blond bob in Collection 001. She uses the Diva head mold, which was first used by Barbie's bandmate of the same name in her band Barbie and the Rockers. The head mold was also notably used by Barbie's friend Midge after she reappeared in 1988.
- "Model No. 10" is an African-American doll with long black hair in Collection 001. Her head mold was first used for the annual 2002 Barbie (African-American version) and for several African-American dolls a few years later. It was officially named the Desiree (a.k.a. Adria) face sculpt after Barbie's friend of the same name in the Fashion Fever line in 2005. The head mold is currently used for African-American friends in the main line such as Artsy and Nikki.
- "Model No. 11" has olive skin and a short brunette bob in Collection 001. She is totally revamped in Collection 002, where she has tan skin and long blond hair. She uses the Teresa head mold which was used by Barbie's friend of the same name in the main line from 1992 to 2006.
- "Model No. 12" has tan skin and long dirty blond hair in Collection 001. She uses the rarely used Tango face sculpt which first appeared in the 2002 Tango Barbie and Ken gift set and is also used for Shannen in Fashion Fever Line.
- "Model No. 13" debuted in Collection 001.5 and has peach skin and pixie-cut dark hair. She uses the Generation Girl (a.k.a. CEO) head mold which was first used by Barbie in the line of the same name. The head mold is currently used for the character of Barbie in the main line.
- "Model No. 14" debuted in Collection 002 where she has pale skin and long dark brown hair. She is also featured in Collection 002.5, with long platinum blond hair and the same skin tone. She returns in Collection 003 with the same overall look she donned in Collection 002, but with tanner skin. She uses the Louboutin head mold, which was first used in Christian Louboutin's series of dolls in the Barbie Collector line (and is also known as "Glimmer" after the "Glimmer of Gold" doll from the Robert Best Precious Metals series).
- "Model No. 15" debuted in Collection 002 where he has pale skin and shoulder-length dark hair. He is one of the three Ken dolls in Collection 002. His head mold was first used for the character of Edward Cullen in the Twilight films' series of dolls by Mattel. Despite this, the head mold is often called the Harley Ken since it was popularly used by Ken for the 2010 Harley-Davidson Barbie and Ken gift set.
- "Model No. 16" debuted in Collection 002 where he has peach skin and short blond hair. He uses the Ken Tango head mold which was first used for Ken in the 2002 Tango Barbie and Ken gift set. The head mold was also notably used by Blaine, Barbie's friend (and one-time romantic interest).
- "Model No. 17" debuted in Collection 002 as an African-American doll with cropped hair. He uses an all-new head sculpt never before used by Mattel, dubbed by collectors as the New Basic.

== Controversy ==
One of the dolls, Model No. 10, gained controversy for her stock dress (which had a v-neck with a plunging neckline). Several parents complained and the matter was even covered by news and media. Despite the parents' pleas for the removal of the doll from the shelves, retail stores such as Wal-Mart and Toys "R" Us argued that they would continue to sell the dolls since the line is aimed toward adult collectors and is not for children. Since the incident, versions of Model No. 10's dress have borne a shorter v-neck or a completely round neckline.

== Promotion ==
The Barbie Basics was the first doll line (and retail product) to bear the logo of the CFDA (Council of Fashion Designers of America) on their boxes. The line was officially approved by the CFDA and several of its members have even quoted about the line in the official Barbie Basics website.

A special production of Barbie dolls was produced from 1980 to 1982. One look was introduced with a classic Barbie doll dressed out with Nike white shoes. A production run of 200 Barbie dolls were sold to retailers in Florida and Georgia test markets. Limited quantities are known to be highly sought after and is a rare collectable among collectors. In 1994, a 1982 Barbie doll sold at auction for $12,000.

In late January 2010, Mattel officially released 12 one-of-a-kind dolls made by several designers who were members of the CFDA. These were Models No. 1 to 12 as designed by 12 different designers. The designers were: Rachel Roy, Tory Burch, Albertus Swanepoel, Phillip Crangi, Kate Spade (represented by Deborah Lloyd), Monica Botkier, Betsey Johnson, Isaac Mizrahi, Alexis Bittar, Lorraine Schwartz, Justin Guinta for Subversive Jewelry, and Devi Kroell. The one-of-a-kind dolls were auctioned in eBay and all of the proceeds went to various charities and foundations sponsored by the CFDA.

To promote the line in Australia, Mattel enlisted renowned Australian jeweler Stefano Canturi to create a one-of-a-kind doll. Canturi collaborated with the Barbie design team to create the world's most expensive Barbie doll. Valued at A$600,000, the doll debuted in Sydney, Australia in conjunction to the Australian Fashion Week. The doll was decorated with a diamond choker with a rare pink diamond as its centerpiece.

== Current lines ==
Spring 2010

- Collection 001:
  - Models No. 1, 2, 3, 4, 5, 6, 7, 8, 9, 10, 11, 12
  - Looks No. 1, 2, 3, 4

Fall 2010

- Collection 001.5:
  - Models No. 1, 3, 6, 13
  - Looks No. 1, 2
- Collection Red (Target exclusives):
  - Models No. 1, 3, 8
  - Look No. 1

Spring 2011

- Collection 002:
  - Models No. 1, 2, 3, 4, 5, 7, 8, 11, 14, 15, 16, 17
  - Looks No. 1, 2, 3, 4

Fall 2011

- Collection 002.5:
  - Models No. 4, 8, 14
  - Looks No. 1, 2
- Collection Red (Target exclusives):
  - Models No. 1, 2, 3
  - Look No. 2

Spring 2012

- Collection 003:
  - Models No. 2, 4, 5, 7, 8, 14
  - Looks No. 1, 2

== See also ==
- Barbie
- little black dress
