= Undersøkelseskommisjonen av 1945 =

Norwegian commission

Undersøkelseskommisjonen av 1945 was a commission appointed by the Parliament of Norway in 1945 and chaired by Norwegian politician Gustav Heiberg, given the task to investigate the role of the three branches of power: the Norwegian Parliament, Government and Supreme Court, as well as the Administrative Council in 1940. The six reports with nine annexes published by the commission in 1946 and 1947, are regarded as an important source on the events in 1940.

== Commission members ==
- Gustav Adolf Lammers Heiberg (chairman)
- Arne Bergsgård
- Ernst Fredrik Eckhoff
- Ole Hallesby
- Arnold Holmboe
- Sverre Steen
- Nils Nilsen Thune
- Helge Sivertsen (secretary).

== Reports ==
- I. Foreign and defence policy under Nygaardsvold's Cabinet until 7 June 1940 (with eight annexes, 1–8)
- II. Administrative Council
- III. Riksrådsforhandlingene (with annex 9)
- IV. The Supreme Court
- V. County governors and new organization of the municipalities in 1940
- VI. Undertakings of the Cabinet Nygaardsvold from 7 June 1940 to 25 June 1945

=== Annexes ===
- 1. Sivertsen, Helge. Tysklands planer om overfall på Norge (in Norwegian).
- 2. Nordlie, J.H. Kort oversikt over kampene i Norge våren 1940 (in Norwegian).
- 3. Bergsgård, Arne. Utenrikspolitikken til april 1940 (in Norwegian).
- 4. "Altmark"-saken (in Norwegian).
- 5. Holmboe, Arnold. Norsk forsvarspolitikk før 9. april 1940 (in Norwegian).
- 6. Den sivile beredskapspolitikk til 9. april 1940 (in Norwegian).
- 7. Aprildagene 1940 (in Norwegian).
- 8. Norsk politikk 9. april – 1. juni 1940 (in Norwegian).
- 9. Steen, Sverre. Riksrådsforhandlingene (in Norwegian).
