= Fortyfivedownstairs =

Theatre and gallery in Melbourne, Australia

fortyfivedownstairs
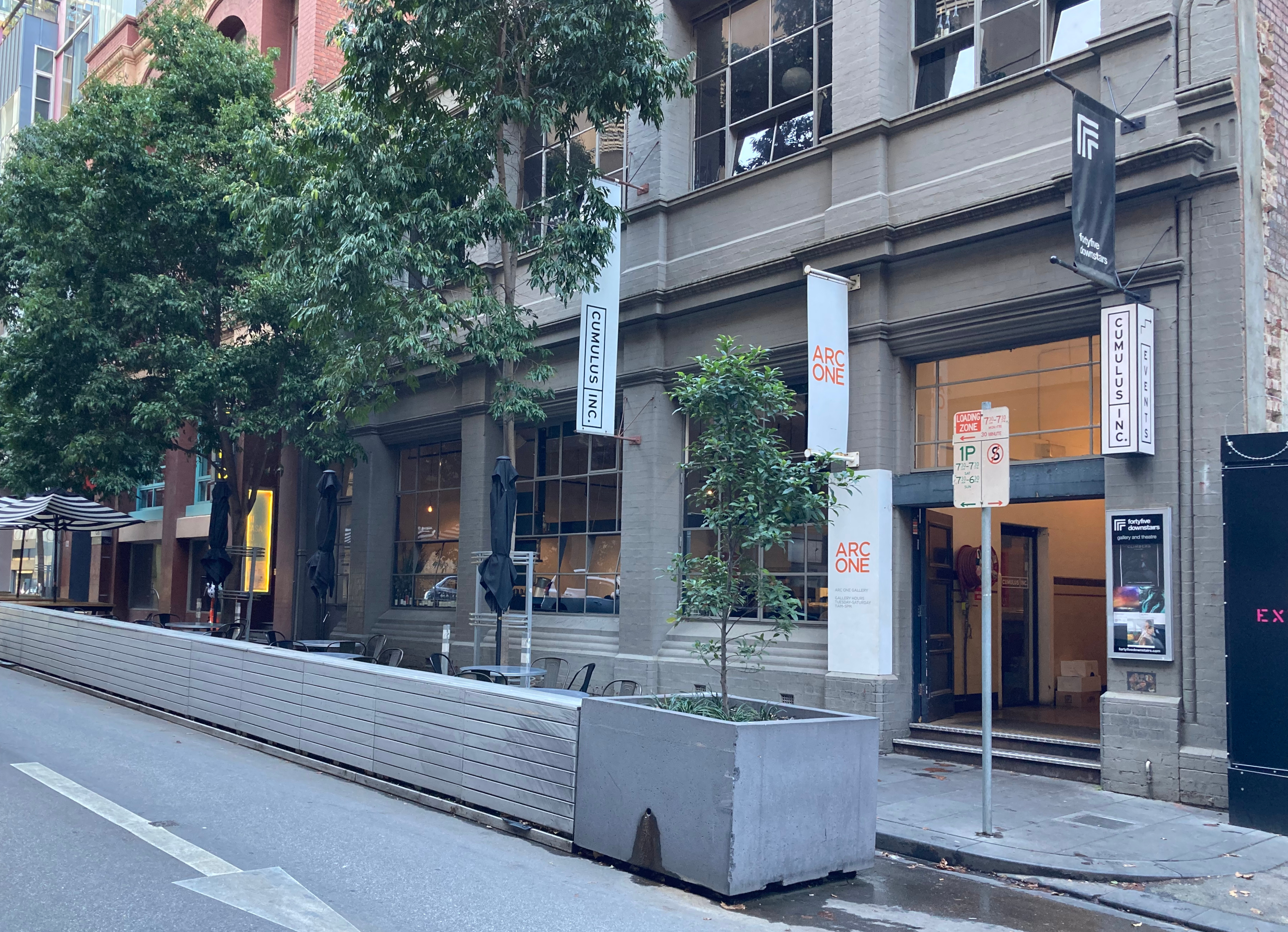
- Interactive map of fortyfivedownstairs
- Address: 45 Flinders Lane; Melbourne
- Coordinates: 37.814964°S 144.973162°E

Construction
- Opened: 2002

Website
- www.fortyfivedownstairs.com

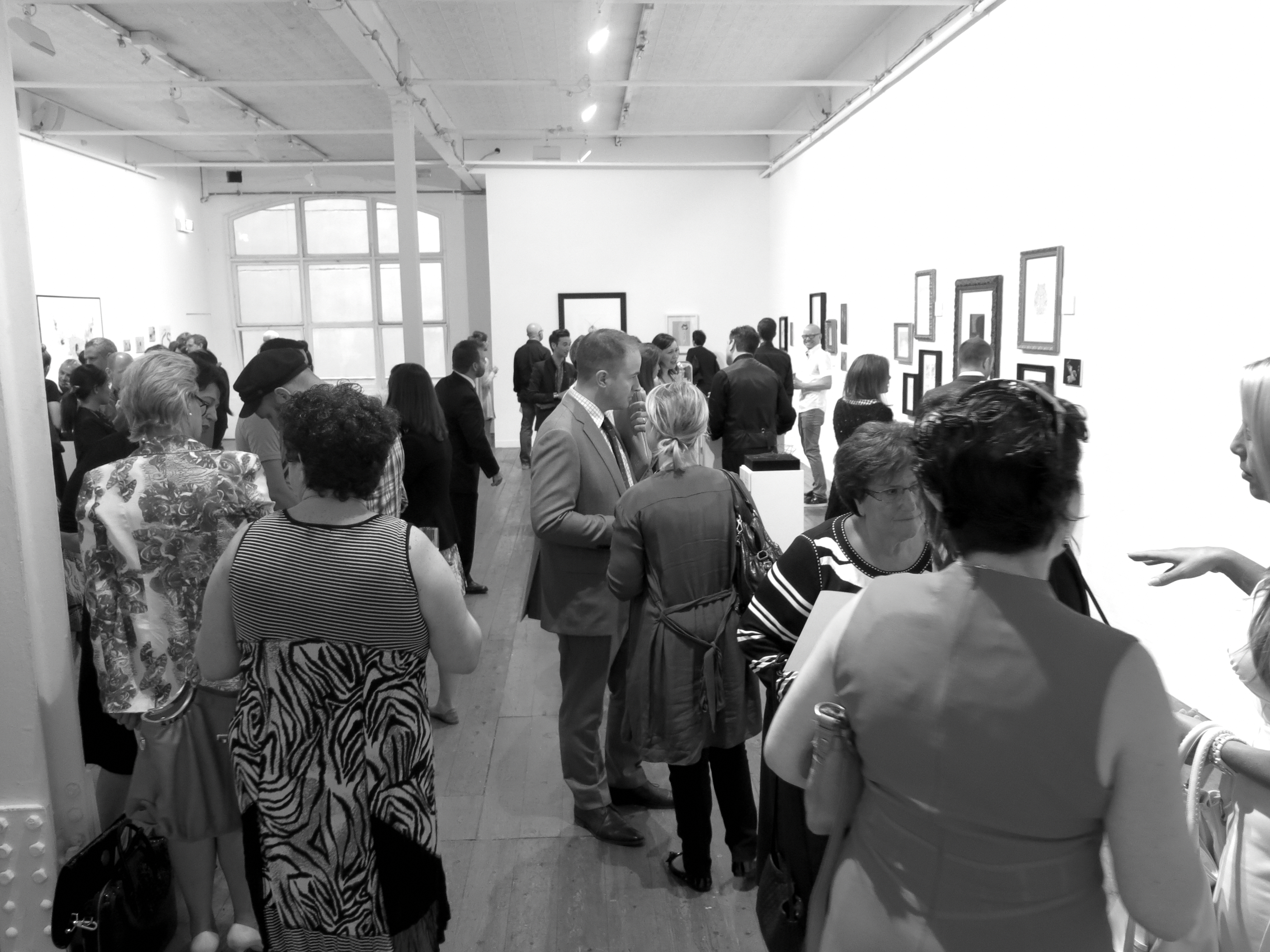
Journey art exhibition by Stefano Canturi in February 2013

fortyfivedownstairs is a not-for-profit theatre and gallery in Melbourne, Australia.

Located on the lower floors of a nineteenth century building in Flinders Lane, fortyfivedownstairs showcases visual art, independent theatre, and live music. An institution that nurtures risk-taking artists, the organisation was founded in 2002 by former ABC journalist Mary Lou Jelbart AM, Julian Burnside AO KC, and a group of like-minded supporters who agreed in the early years to support the inner-city venue.

Jelbart served as Artistic Director of both the theatre and gallery from 2002 to 2022. In 2023, producer Cameron Lukey was appointed Artistic Director of the theatre.
