= Ada Polak =

Norwegian art historian (1914–2010)

Ada Buch Polak
- Born: 19 September 1914; Ljan, Norway
- Died: 25 October 2010 (aged 96); London, England
- Education: University of Oslo
- Occupation: art historian

Ada Buch Polak (19 September 1914 – 25 October 2010) was a Norwegian art historian.

== Biography ==
Andrea Buch was born in Ljan, Norway. Her father was the engineer Harald Buch (1872–1950) and her mother was the teacher Camilla Collett (1878–1973). She was a great-granddaughter of writer Camilla Collett (1813–1895) and professor Peter Jonas Collett (1813-1851), grandniece of museum curator Robert (1842-1913) and historian Alf Collett (1844–1919). Her sister Ellisiv (1908–2001) married historian and professor Sverre Steen (1898–1983).

She finished her secondary education in 1933 and graduated from the University of Oslo in 1940 with the thesis Norsk Glass 1739–1753, and continued working with glass to take her doctorate in 1953 on the thesis Gammelt norsk glass.

She spent half a year as an associate professor at the Norwegian Museum of Decorative Arts and Design, and was then a curator at West Norway Museum of Decorative Art (Vestlandske Kunstindustrimuseum) from 1942 to 1948.

Polak spent the rest of her career as a freelance writer, contributing to books, journals and yearbooks, magazines and newspapers. She was on a state scholarship from the early 1980s. She was a member of the Norwegian Academy of Science and Letters, and was decorated as a Knight, First Class of the Royal Norwegian Order of St. Olav in 1981.

== Personal life ==
In July 1948 she married the British solicitor Alfred Laurence Polak (1900–1992), and moved to London. She died in October 2010 in London.
