= Nordvik Church =

Church in Nordland, Norway

- Nordvik kirke
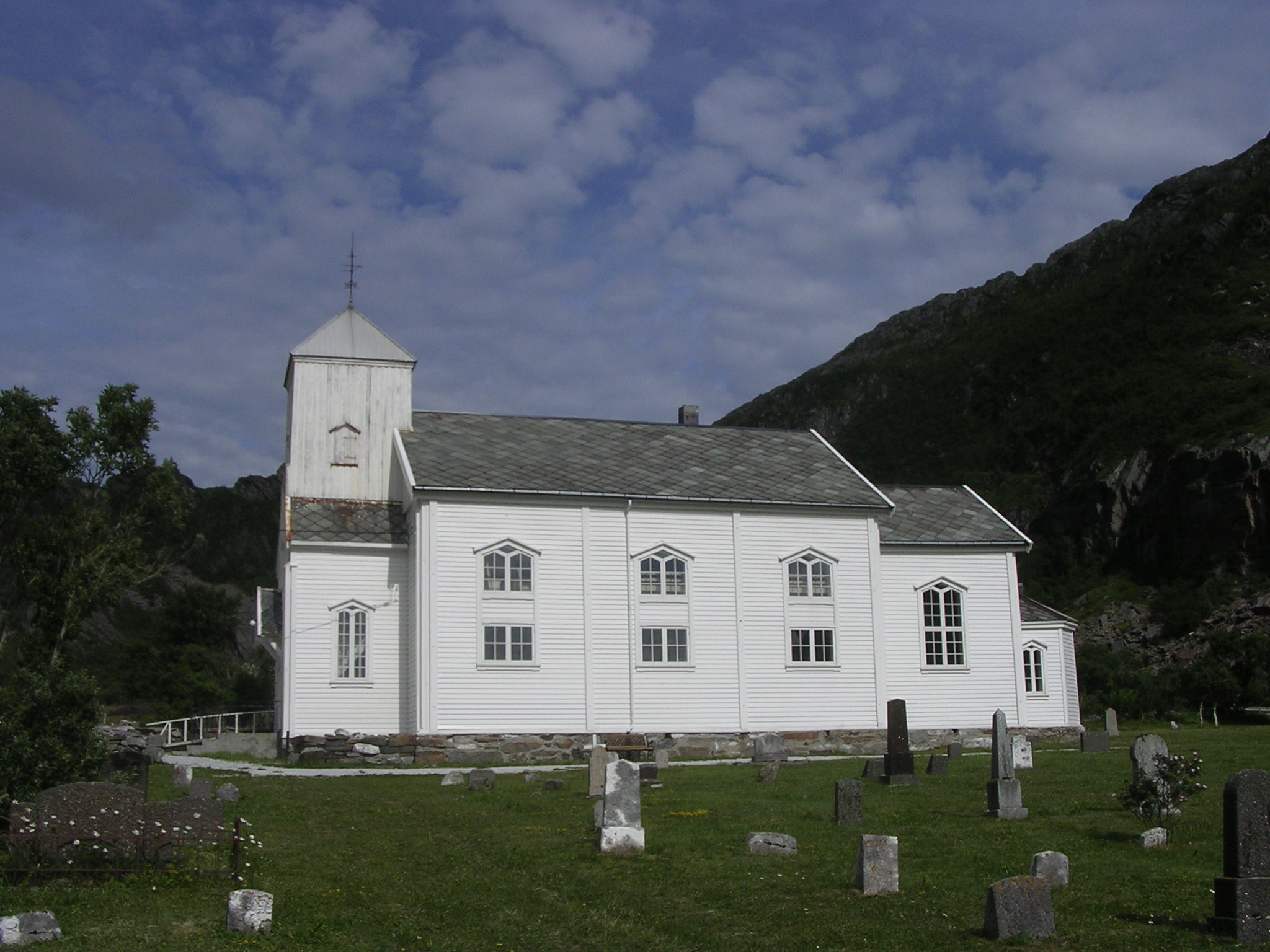
- View of the church
- Nordvik Church
- 66.12401244°N 12.5151739°E
- Location: Dønna Municipality, Nordland
- Country: Norway
- Denomination: Church of Norway
- Churchmanship: Evangelical Lutheran

History
- Status: Parish church
- Founded: 1871
- Consecrated: 18 June 1871

Architecture
- Functional status: Active
- Architect: Niels Eckhoff
- Architectural type: Long church
- Completed: 1871 (155 years ago)

Specifications
- Capacity: 300
- Materials: Wood

Administration
- Diocese: Sør-Hålogaland
- Deanery: Nord-Helgeland prosti
- Parish: Dønna
- Norwegian Cultural Heritage Site
- Type: Church
- Status: Listed
- ID: 85172

Nordvik Church (Norwegian: Nordvik kirke) is a parish church of the Church of Norway in Dønna Municipality in Nordland county, Norway. It is located at Nordvik, just north of the village of Solfjellsjøen on the island of Dønna. It is one of the churches for the Dønna parish which is part of the Nord-Helgeland prosti (deanery) in the Diocese of Sør-Hålogaland. The white, wooden church was built in a long church style in 1871 using plans drawn up by the architect Niels Stockfleth Darre Eckhoff. The church seats about 300 people. The building was consecrated on 18 June 1871. Historically, it was the main church for the old Nordvik Municipality which existed from 1917 until 1962.

== See also ==
- List of churches in Sør-Hålogaland
