= Solfjellsjøen =

Village in Dønna Municipality, Norway

Solfjellsjøen Solfjellsjyen
- Village
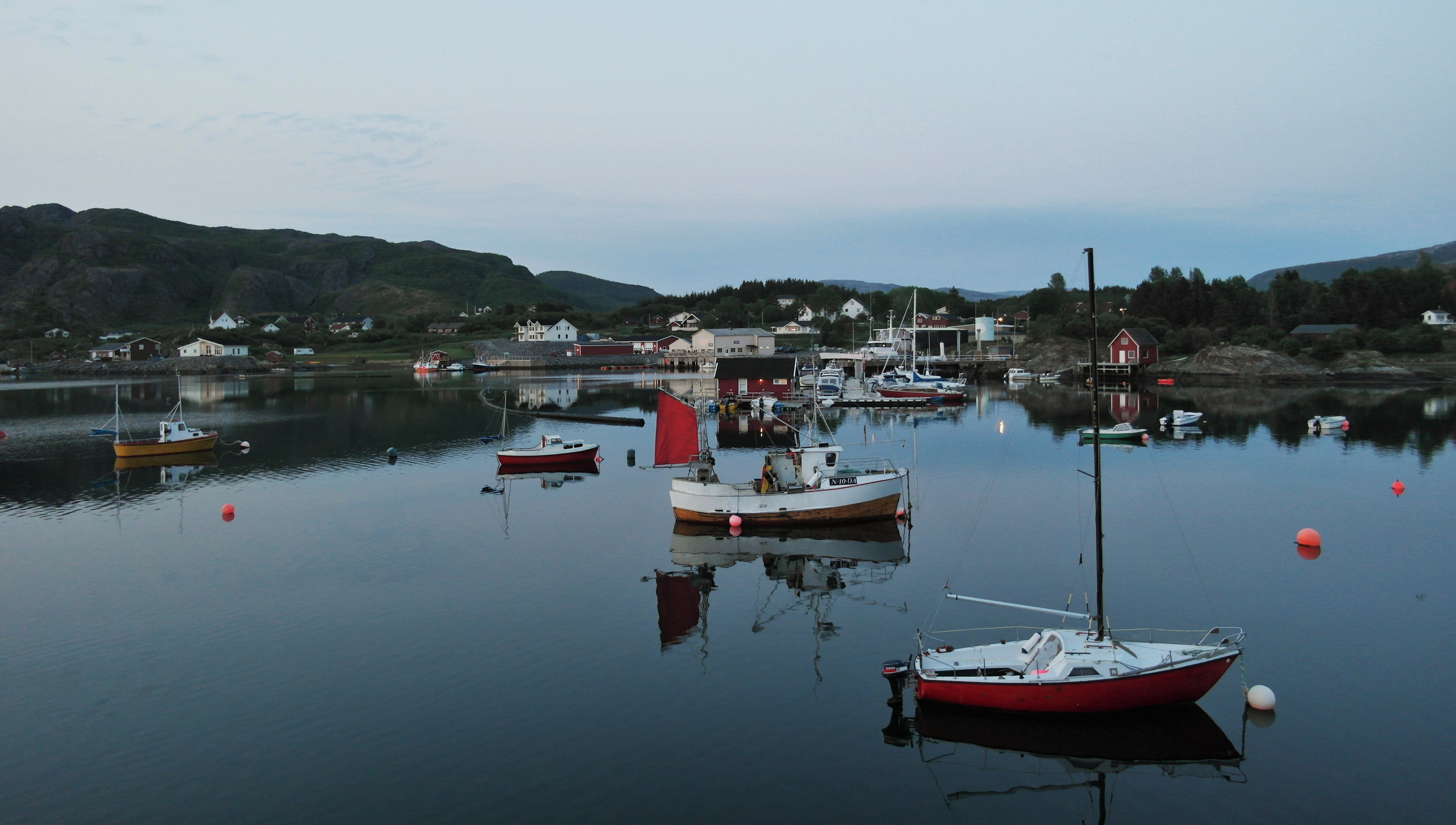
- View of the village harbour
- Interactive map of Solfjellsjøen
- Location within Nordland Location within Norway
- Coordinates: 66.1090°N 12.4905°E
- Country: Norway
- Region: Northern Norway
- County: Nordland
- District: Helgeland
- Municipality: Dønna Municipality

Area
  - Total: 0.31 km^{2} (0.12 sq mi)
- Elevation: 13 m (43 ft)

Population (2024)
  - Total: 270
  - Density: 871/km^{2} (2,260/sq mi)
- Time zone: UTC+01:00 (CET)
  - Summer (DST): UTC+02:00 (CEST)
- Post Code: 8820 Dønna

Solfjellsjøen is the administrative centre of Dønna Municipality in Nordland county, Norway. The village is located on the west-central part of the island of Dønna. Nordvik Church is located about 2 kilometres (1.2 mi) north of the village. There is a ferry connection from Solfjellsjøen to the nearby island of Vandve to the west.

The 0.31-square-kilometre (77-acre) village has a population (2024) of 270 and a population density of 871 inhabitants per square kilometre (2,260/sq mi).

== Notable people ==
- Odd-Harald Vistnes Forsland, a politician from Solfjellsjøen
