= Ellisiv Steen =

Norwegian professor and literary researcher

- Born: 4 February 1908; Kristiania (now Oslo), Norway
- Died: 27 October 2001 (aged 93)
- Education: University of Oslo
- Occupations: professor and literary researcher
- Known for: board member of Norsk Film, Norwegian editor of the Swedish periodical Ord och Bild
- Spouses: Sverre Steen (m. 1933)
- Parents: Harald Buch (father); Camilla Collett (mother)
- Relatives: Ada Polak (sister)
- Awards: fellow, Norwegian Academy of Science and Letters

Ellisiv Andrea Steen (4 February 1908 – 27 October 2001) was a Norwegian professor and literary researcher.

== Biography ==
She was born in Kristiania (now Oslo), Norway. She was the daughter of Harald Buch (1872–1950) and Camilla Collett (1878–1973) and a sister of art historian Ada Polak. In 1933 she married professor and historian Sverre Steen.

Her master's thesis was a study of English writer and philosopher Aldous Huxley. She gained her Doctor of Philosophy degree at the University of Oslo in 1948; the subject of her doctoral thesis was a treatment on the authorship of Norwegian writer Camilla Collett. She was a fellow of the Norwegian Academy of Science and Letters from 1955, and appointed professor at the University of Oslo in 1972.

She was a board member of Norsk Film from 1948 to 1964, and Norwegian editor of the Swedish periodical Ord och Bild from 1950 to 1959.

== Selected works ==
- Aldous Huxley - 1935
- Diktning og virkelighet. En studie i Camilla Colletts forfatterskap - 1947
- Den lange strid. En studie i Camilla Colletts senere forfatterskap - 1954
- Kristin Lavransdatter. En kritisk studie - 1959
- Tarjei Vesaas: Is-slottet - 1964
