= Jens Henrik Nordlie =

Norwegian businessman and resistance fighter (1910–1996)

- Born: 18 January 1910; Kristiania, Norway
- Died: 2 April 1996 (aged 86); Oslo
- Occupations: Businessperson and military officer
- Organization: Fritt Ord

Jens Henrik Nordlie (18 January 1910 – 2 April 1996) was a Norwegian military officer, resistance fighter from World War II and businessperson. He participated in the Norwegian Campaign in 1940, and was a member of Milorg's leadership in 1941. He worked for the Norwegian High Command in London from 1943, leading one of the two sections of department 4 (FO IV). He contributed to the post-war investigation committee, Undersøkelseskommisjonen av 1945, where he wrote the appendix on the fighting in Norway in spring 1940. He was operative leader of the clandestine Stay behind in Norway. He was CEO of the company Narvesen from 1957 to 1975, and a co-founder of the organization Fritt Ord.

== Personal life ==
Nordlie was born in Kristiania to colonel Oswald Fredrik Wilhelm Nordlie and Anna Margrethe Holtermann Carlsen. He was married twice, first to Grete Stephanson, and second to Lise Ringberg. He died in Oslo in 1996.
