= Kristofer Randers =

Norwegian poet

- Born: 1 April 1851; Aremark, Norway
- Died: 15 March 1917 (aged 65); Kristiania
- Occupations: poet, theatre critic

Ole Kristofer Randers (1 April 1851 – 15 March 1917) was a Norwegian poet and theatre critic. He made his literary debut in 1879 with the poetry collection Med Lyre og Lanse. His travel guide book on Sunnmøre, Søndmøre. Reisehaandbog from 1890, has been re-issued several times. He was also a theatre critic for the newspaper Aftenposten.

Randers died in Kristiania on 15 March 1917.

== Selected works ==
- Søndmøre. Reisehaandbog (1890)
