= Daniel Frederik Petersen =

Norwegian Constitutional Assembly
- In office 1814–1814

Personal details
- Born: 21 December 1757 Drammen, Norway
- Died: 24 September 1816 (aged 58)
- Occupation: Military officer

Daniel Frederik Petersen (21 December 1757 – 24 September 1816) was a Norwegian army officer.

Johan Daniel Frederik Petersen was born at Drammen in Buskerud county, Norway.

He was a career army pfficer. He first enlisted in the military during 1783 in the service of the Prussian Army. He rose in the rank to Captain in the Norske Jegerkorps at Kongsvinger in Hedmark during 1788 and Major in the 2nd Akershus Infantry Regiment in 1801. In 1807, he became a Lieutenant colonel and in 1811 Colonel and Commanding officer of Sønnafjelske infantry Regiment in Halden at the fortress of Fredriksten. In 1814 he had the rank of Major General and was Second-in-command at Fredriksten fortress.

He represented Sønnafjelske infantry Regiment, together with Ole Svendsen Iglerød, at the Norwegian Constituent Assembly in 1814. He died in Christiania during 1816.
