= Torstein Eckhoff =

Norwegian civil servant and professor of law

Torstein Einang Eckhoff (5 June 1916 – 17 April 1993) was a Norwegian civil servant and professor of law at the University of Oslo.

== Personal life ==
He was born in Vestre Slidre Municipality as the son of shipmaster Trygve Eckhoff (1884–1957) and his wife Sigrid Einang (1886–1971). He was a brother of designer Mathias Gerrard Eckhoff, a second cousin of jurist Ernst Fredrik Eckhoff and actor Johannes Eckhoff, and a grandnephew of architect Niels Stockfleth Darre Eckhoff. In 1941 he married psychologist Eva Bergliot Råness (1921–1991). They resided at Eiksmarka.

== Career ==
Eckhoff finished his secondary education in 1934, and enrolled in law studies at the University of Oslo. He graduated with the cand.jur. degree in 1938, and worked as a deputy judge on the island of Senja until 1940. He then became a lecturer of law, and released several books during World War II. His 1945 book Rettskraft earned him the dr.juris degree in 1947. In 1945 he was hired in the Ministry of Justice and the Police, where he was promoted to assistant secretary after one year. He spent a period from 1947 to 1948 in the United States; this resulted in the book Rettsvesen og rettsvitenskap i USA (1953).

In 1953 he left the Ministry of Justice, being appointed as a lecturer at the University of Oslo. He was a member of the Norwegian Academy of Science and Letters from 1955, and was promoted to professor of jurisprudence in 1957. He retired in 1986. Among the books he wrote are Rettskildelære (1971) and Forvaltningsrett (1978). The latter has since his death been updated and edited by Eivind Smith, while the former is taken care of by Jan E. Helgesen. Both books are still important parts of the curriculum at the University of Oslo. Eckhoff was also known for cooperating with law sociologist Vilhelm Aubert and philosopher of law Nils Kristian Sundby. He held honorary degrees at the University of Bergen, the Stockholm University and the University of Turku, and a festschrift was issued for his seventieth birthday.

Regarded as Norway's leading authority on European Community law, Eckhoff was known for his work outside of academica as an opponent of Norwegian membership in the community, later the European Union. He referred to the European Economic Area agreement as "a constitutional catastrophe", and played an important role in the debate leading up to the Norwegian rejection in the Norwegian European Union membership referendum of 1994. However, he did not live to see the result as he died in April 1993 in Copenhagen.
