= Bill Greening =

American toy designer

Bill Greening (born c. 1971–72) is an American toy designer. Greening is known for his work at Mattel where he was a designer of Barbie dolls for 26 years. Greening has worked on a number of collaborations between Mattel's Barbie doll and celebrities.

== Background ==
Greening grew up in Orange, California and was given his first Barbie dolls as a child. In 1988, Greening began actively collecting Barbie dolls when he was sixteen years old. His collection numbers more than 500 pieces.

After high school, Greening attended Fullerton Junior College as an art major, later transferring to California State University, Long Beach where he graduated with a bachelor's degree in fashion design.

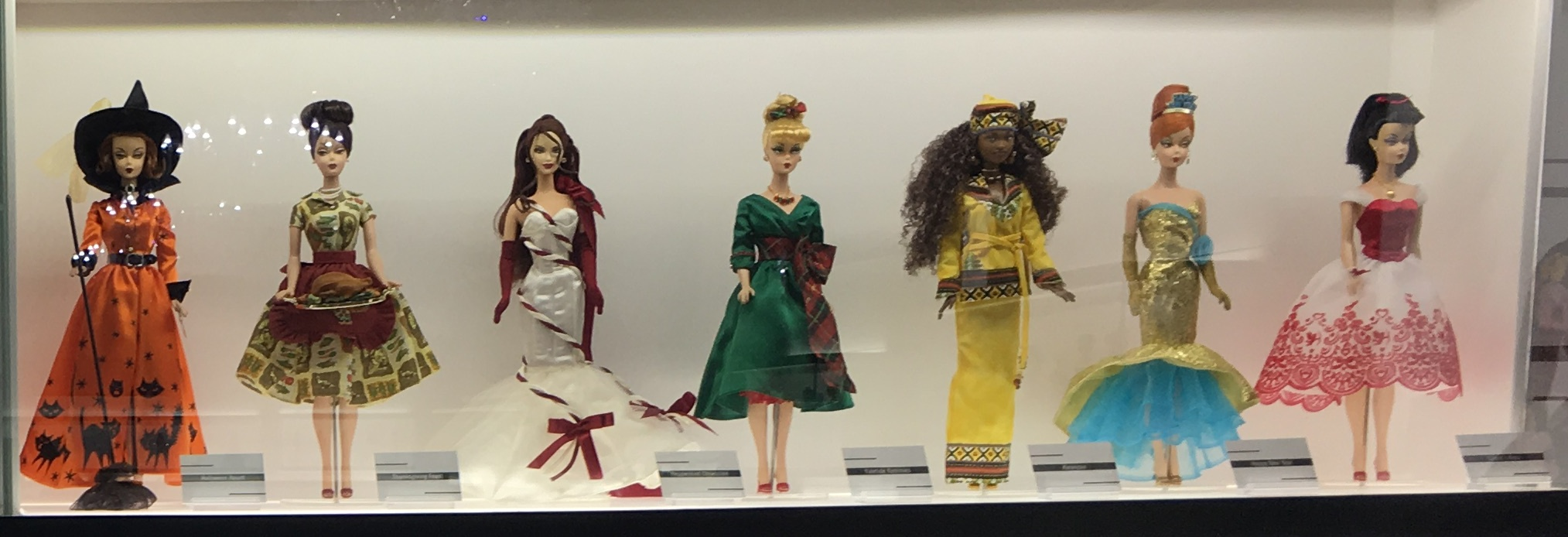
This display of collector Barbie dolls at Barbie Expo Les Cours Mont-Royal showcases several of Greening's designs, including Halloween Haunt (far left) and Cupid's Kisses (far right).

=== Mattel career ===
In 1999 Greening began his career at Mattel as an assistant designer. In 2006, Greening began designing for the Barbie Signature line, where he was later named principal designer. As principal designer, Greening was responsible for developing initial versions of Barbie dolls before toys went into production as well as designing dolls based on celebrities, including Tina Turner, Lucille Ball, Stevie Nicks, and Kylie Minogue. Greening also designed Barbie dolls based on imagined and fantasy characters, including The Hunger Games's Katniss Everdeen, She-Ra, and Lara Croft of the Tomb Raider franchise.

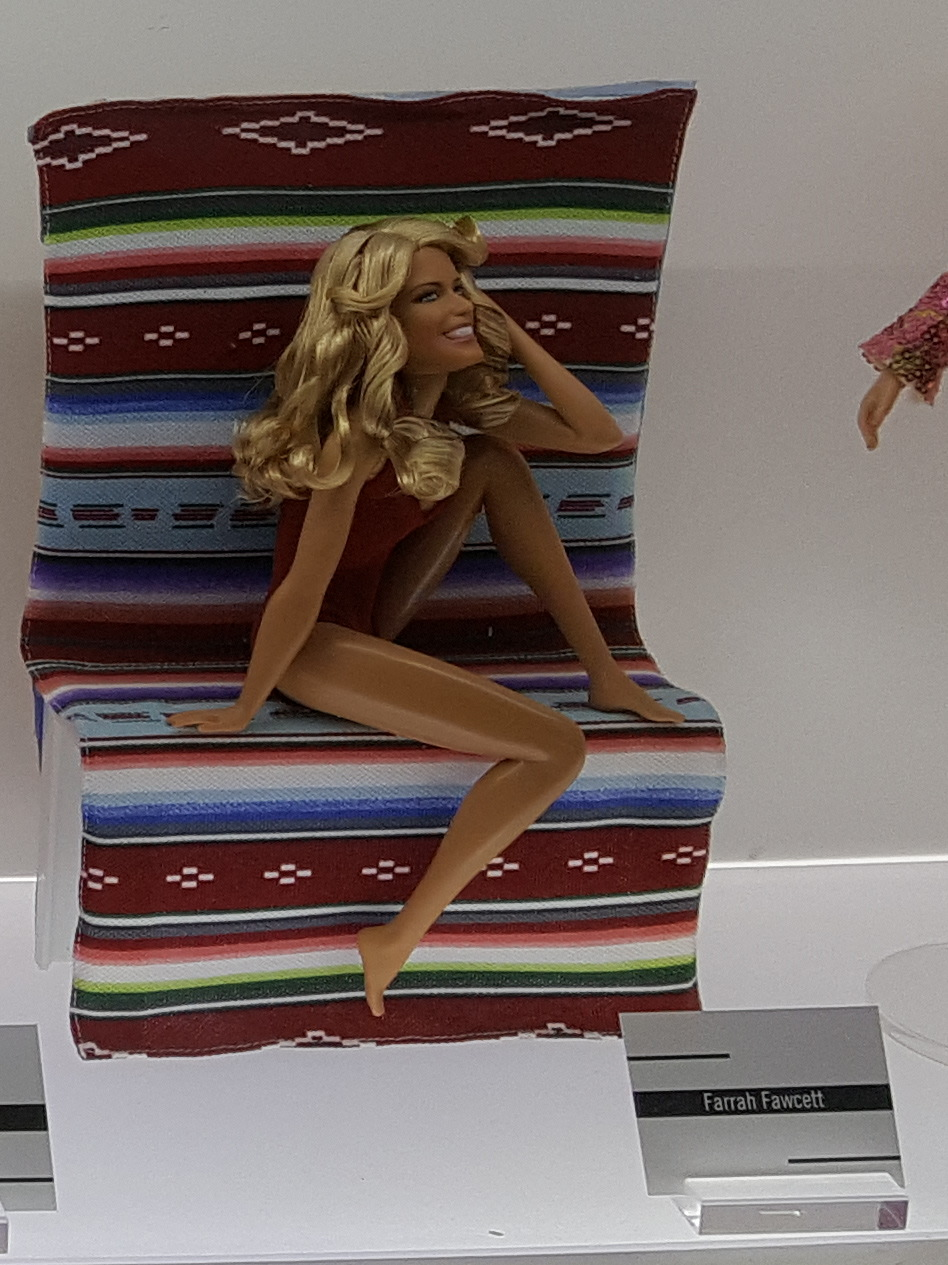
2011 Farrah Fawcett Barbie designed by Bill Greening

In 2020, Greening designed the 40th Anniversary First Black Barbie Doll in honor of Kitty Black Perkins, Greening's mentor and designer of the first black Barbie doll. At the time, Mattel faced criticism that a white man was responsible for designing a black doll. In response, Black Perkins publicly announced support for Greening's work on the doll, saying that “You don’t have to be Black to design Black.”

In 2025, Greening and Kitty Black Perkins collaborated to design and release the 45th Anniversary Kitty Black Perkins Barbie Doll.

In March 2025, Mattel announced sweeping layoffs at the company's El Segundo headquarters, firing 120 workers, including Greening.

=== Independent designer ===
Greening also designs one of a kind dolls for doll conventions and collectors.

== See also ==
- Barbie Basics, doll line created and designed by Greening
- Black Barbie: A Documentary, film about the first black Barbie doll, and where Greening appears
