= Eivind Smith =

Norwegian jurist and professor of law (born 1949)

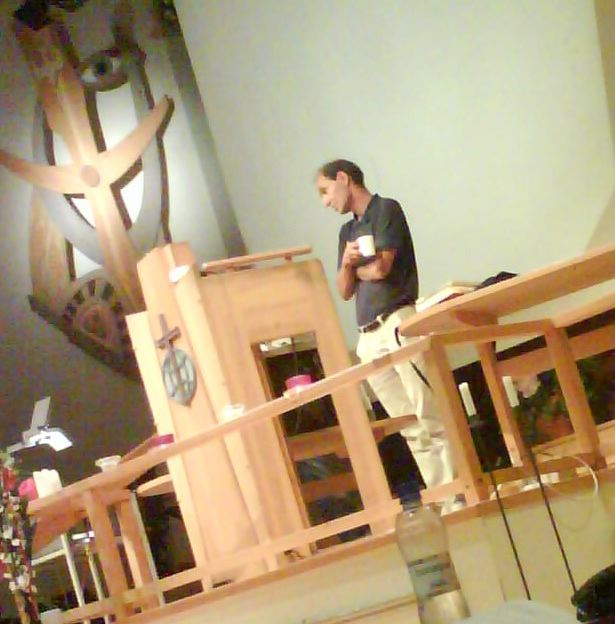

Eivind Smith (born 4 December 1949) is a Norwegian jurist and professor of law.

He was born in Bærum, and took the dr.juris degree in 1979. Since 1986, he has been Professor of Law at the Faculty of Law, University of Oslo. He is a member of the Norwegian Academy of Science and Letters.

He has published a large number of juridical books and articles. He continues to update and edit the book Forvaltningsrett (administrative law) after the original author Torstein Eckhoff died. Smith has also written the book Konstitusjonelt demokrati (constitutional democracy), which forms the bulk of the curriculum in constitutional law at the university.

Smith has been the chair of the Norwegian Institute for Social Research from 2007 to 2010.

On May 29, 1998 Smith received an honorary doctorate from the Faculty of Law at Uppsala University, Sweden In 2014, Smith was awarded an honorary doctorate degree by the University of Copenhagen. This is his third degree honoris causa, holding the former two at the University of Uppsala and at Aix-Marseille Université. Furthermore, Smith is Officer of the Ordre des Palmes Académiques. In 2012 he was anointed Knight of the Legion of Honour.
