= Aremark =

Aremark Municipality Aremark kommune
- Municipality
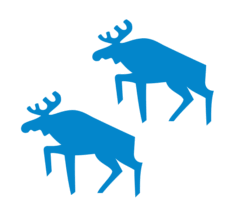
- Flag Coat of arms

- Østfold within Norway

- Aremark within Østfold
- Coordinates: 59°13′23″N 11°41′44″E
- Country: Norway
- County: Østfold
- District: Smaalenene
- Administrative centre: Fosby

Government
  - Mayor (2011): Geir Aarbu (SP)

Area
  - Total: 319 km^{2} (123 sq mi)
  - Land: 282 km^{2} (109 sq mi)
  - Rank: #265 in Norway

Population (2004)
  - Total: 1,424
  - Rank: #376 in Norway
  - Density: 5/km^{2} (13/sq mi)
  - Change (10 years): ▼ −1.3%
- Demonym: Aremarking

Official language
  - Norwegian form: Bokmål
- Time zone: UTC+01:00 (CET)
  - Summer (DST): UTC+02:00 (CEST)
- ISO 3166 code: NO-3124
- Website: Official website

Aremark is a municipality in Østfold county, Norway. The administrative centre of the municipality is the village of Fosby.

Aremark was established as a municipality on 1 January 1838 (see formannskapsdistrikt). The new municipality of Øymark was separated from Aremark on 1 July 1903.

== General information ==
=== Name ===
The Norse form of the name was Aramǫrk. The first element is the genitive of the name of the lake Ari (now Aremarksjøen). (The name of the lake is probably derived from ari which means "eagle", thus "eagle lake".) The last element is mǫrk f 'woodland, borderland' (see March).

=== Coat-of-arms ===
The coat-of-arms is from modern times. They were granted on 7 November 1986. The arms show two blue-colored elk on a silver background. The elk was chosen as a symbol because of the large forests and the many animals in the area.

Number of minorities (1st and 2nd generation) in Aremark by country of origin in 2017
Ancestry	Number
Sweden	11
Syria	7
Germany	6

== Economy ==
Farming and forestry are the two top components of Aremark's economy.

== Culture ==
Every two years in Aremark there is a relatively large festival: Elgfestivalen (elk festival). It is held in a festivity area at Kirkeng Camping. It has been arranged every two years since September 1998. The festival begins Friday afternoon and lasts until Sunday afternoon.

=== Religion ===
There are two chapels/churches in Aremark. Aremark church, which is located near Kirkeng(Church meadow), and Holmgil chapel in Bjørkebekk (Birch creek).

=== Television ===
Aremark has been used in several movie titles and in television. The Norwegian movies "Folk flest bor i Kina" (Most people live in China) and "Celofan" are both filmed in the municipality. The reality show "Farmen" is filmed at Bøensæther husmannsplass close to Marker.

== Sister cities ==
The following cities are twinned with Aremark:

- - Dzērbene, Cēsis district, Latvia

== Notable people ==
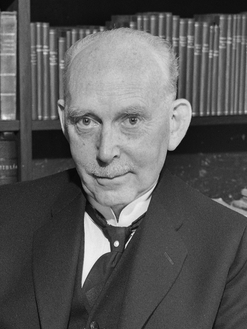
Ole Hallesby, 1949

- Hieronymus Heyerdahl (1773 in Aremark – 1847) a Norwegian minister and politician
- Ludvig Ludvigsen Daae (1834 in Aremark – 1910) a Norwegian historian, author and professor
- Kristofer Randers (1851 in Aremark – 1917) a Norwegian poet and theatre critic
- Ole Hallesby (1879 in Aremark – 1961) a conservative Lutheran theologian and author
- Ole Svendsen Iglerød (1784 in Aremark – 1872) a Norwegian soldier, farmer and politician
- Eyolf Soot (1859 in Aremark – 1928) a Norwegian painter
- Olaf Johannessen (1886 in Aremark – 1943) a Norwegian rifle shooter, twice team silver medallist and team bronze medallist at the 1920 Summer Olympics
- Ruth Vatvedt Fjeld (born 1948 in Aremark) a Norwegian linguist and academic
- Henriette Jæger (born 2003 in Aremark) a Norwegian track and field athlete, a European champion and a participant at the 2024 Summer Olympics.

== Gallery ==
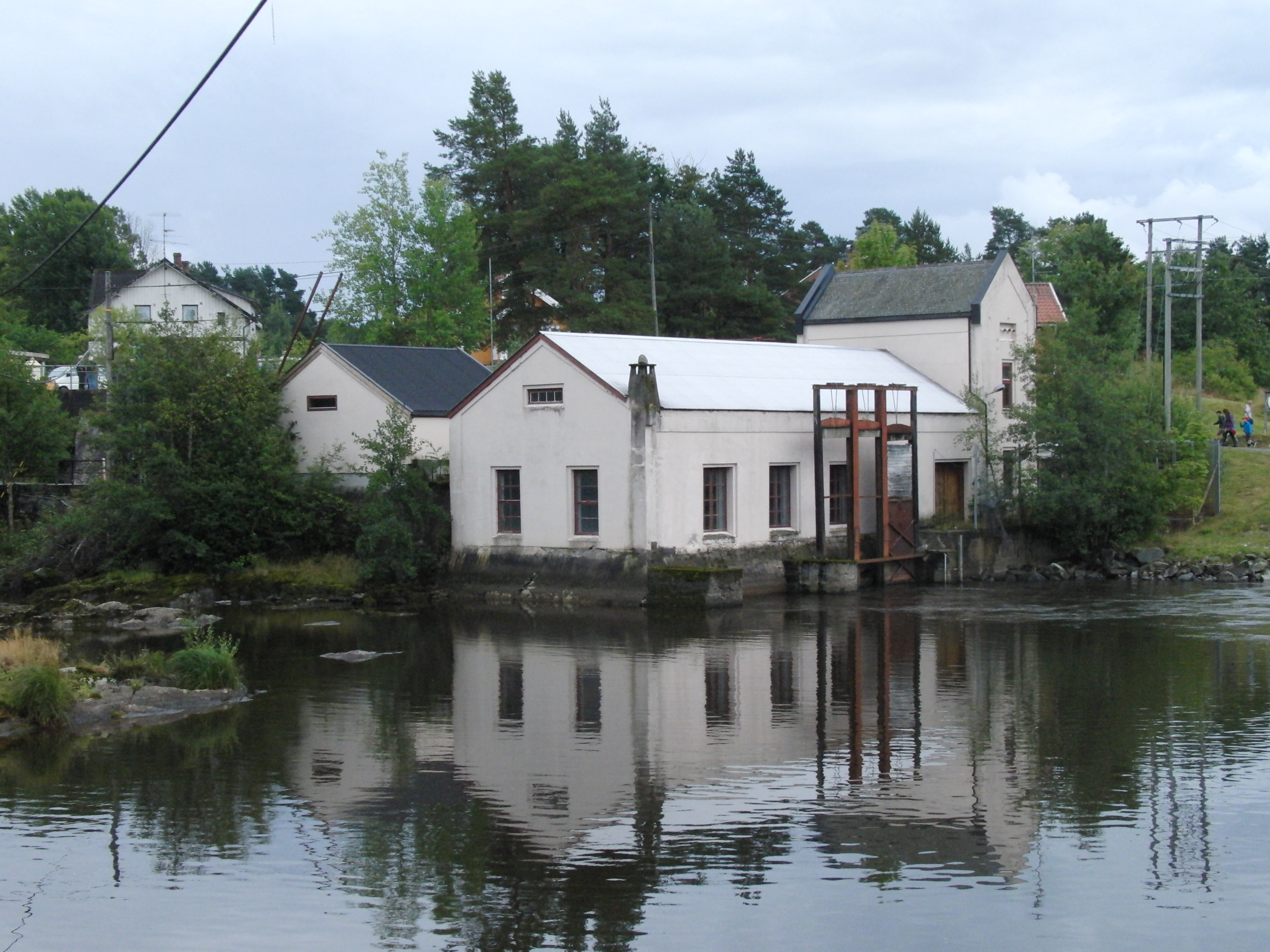
Strømsfoss kraftverk

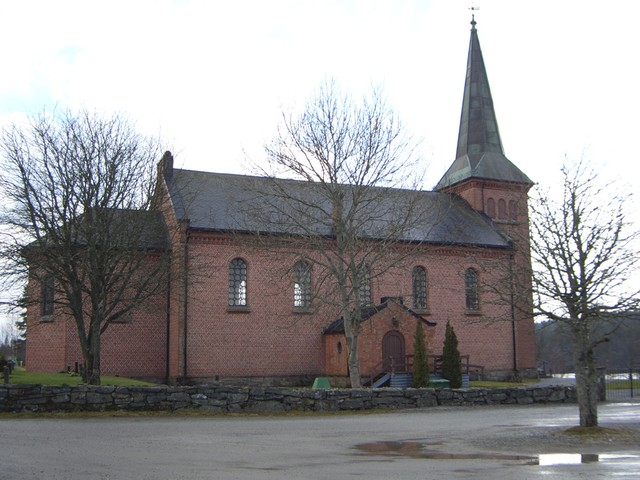
Aremark kirke

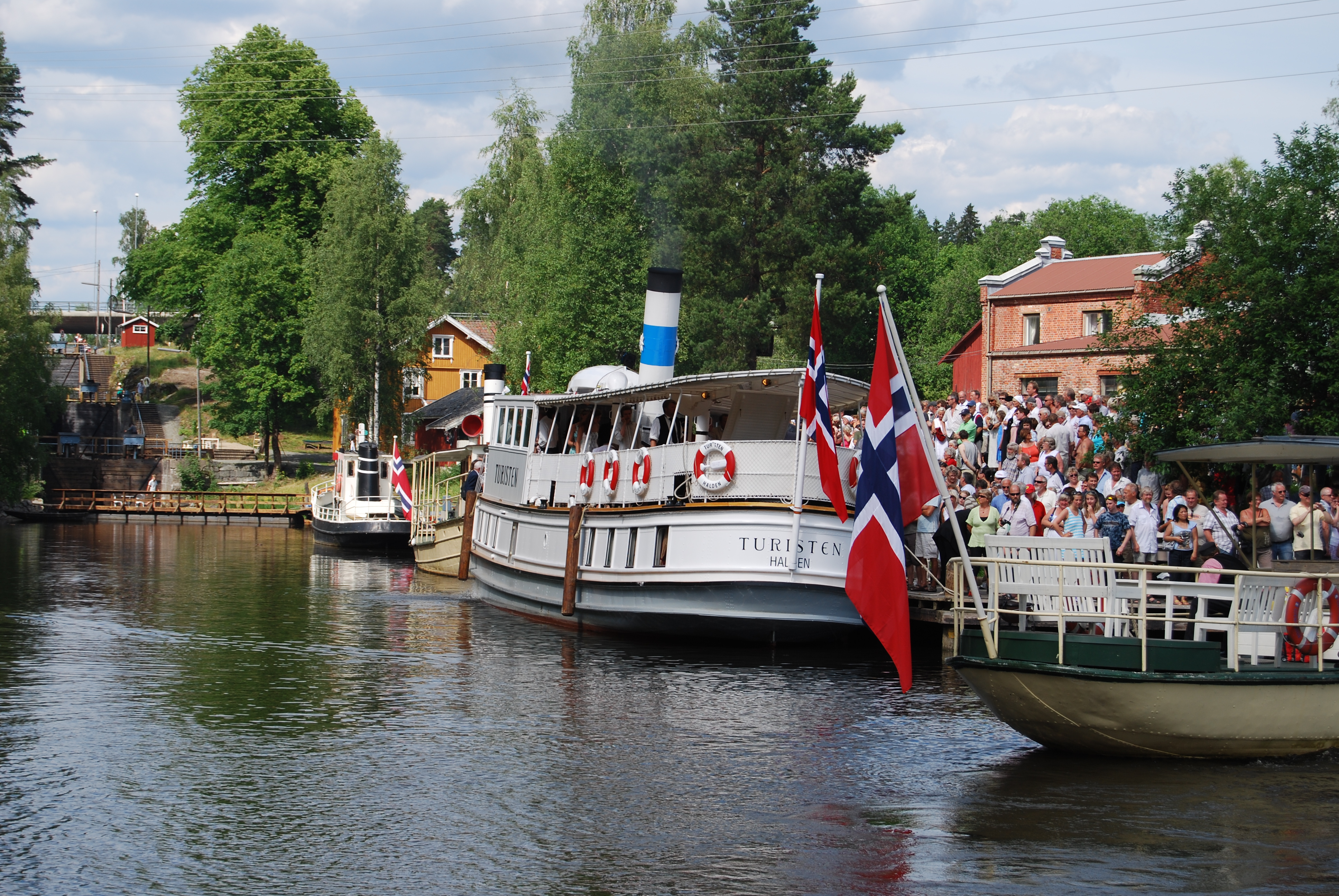
DS Turisten

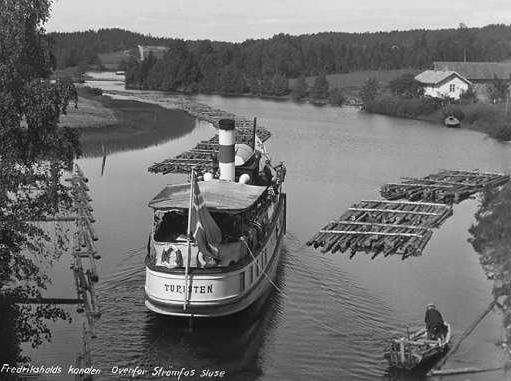
DS Turisten, 1925
