= Fredrik Ludvig Konow =

Norwegian politician (1864–1953)

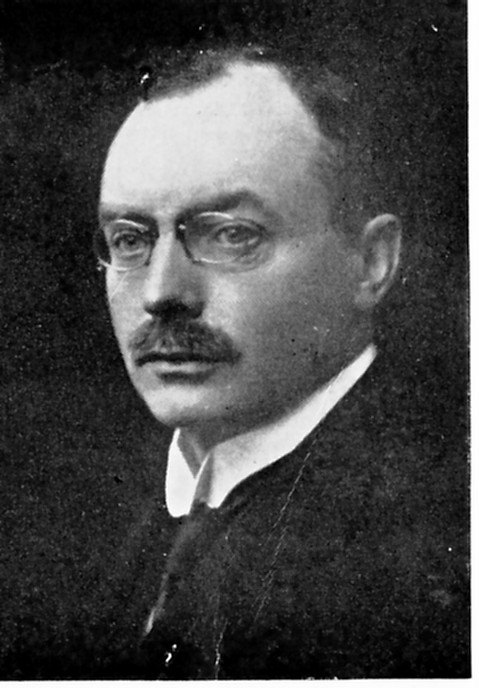

Minister of Finance
- In office 5 March 1926 – 28 January 1928
- Prime Minister: Ivar Lykke
- Preceded by: Arnold Holmboe
- Succeeded by: Christopher Hornsrud
- In office 20 February 1912 – 31 January 1913
- Prime Minister: Jens Bratlie
- Preceded by: Abraham Berge
- Succeeded by: Anton Omholt

Member of the Norwegian Parliament
- In office 1 January 1919 – 31 December 1921
- Constituency: Nordnes
- In office 1 January 1910 – 31 December 1912
- Constituency: Nordnes

Personal details
- Born: 23 June 1864 Bergen, Hordaland, United Kingdoms of Sweden and Norway
- Died: 14 August 1953 (aged 89) Bergen, Hordaland, Norway
- Party: Free-minded Liberal
- Spouse(s): Karen Doris Elisabeth Rieck (m. 1904); Birgit Helene Schjøtt (1896–1901 her death)
- Children: 5

Fredrik Ludvig Konow (23 June 1864 – 14 August 1953) was a Norwegian businessman and a politician for the Free-minded Liberal Party.

He was born in Bergen as a son of merchant and consul Wollert Konow (1829–1885) and Wilhelmine Marie Bredahl (1828–1908). He was named after his grandfather, who was son of Wollert Konow and a brother of Wollert and Carl Konow. His great-great-grandfather was named Friedrich Ludwig Konow, and migrated to Bergen from Germany in the late 1700s.

Fredrik Ludvig Konow was also a second cousin of Carl and Sten Konow, first cousin once removed of Wollert Konow (H) and Wollert Konow (SB), and uncle of Frederik Konow Lund. He was married twice; first to Birgit Helene Schjøtt (1877–1901) since 1896, and after her death to Lily Rieck (1878–1956) since 1904.

He was Minister of Finance during 1912–1913 and 1926–1928. The first time he served in the Bratlie's Cabinet, then in Lykke's Cabinet. He was also elected to the Parliament of Norway from the constituency Nordnes in 1909 and 1918.
