= Niels Stockfleth Darre Eckhoff =

Norwegian architect (1831–1914)

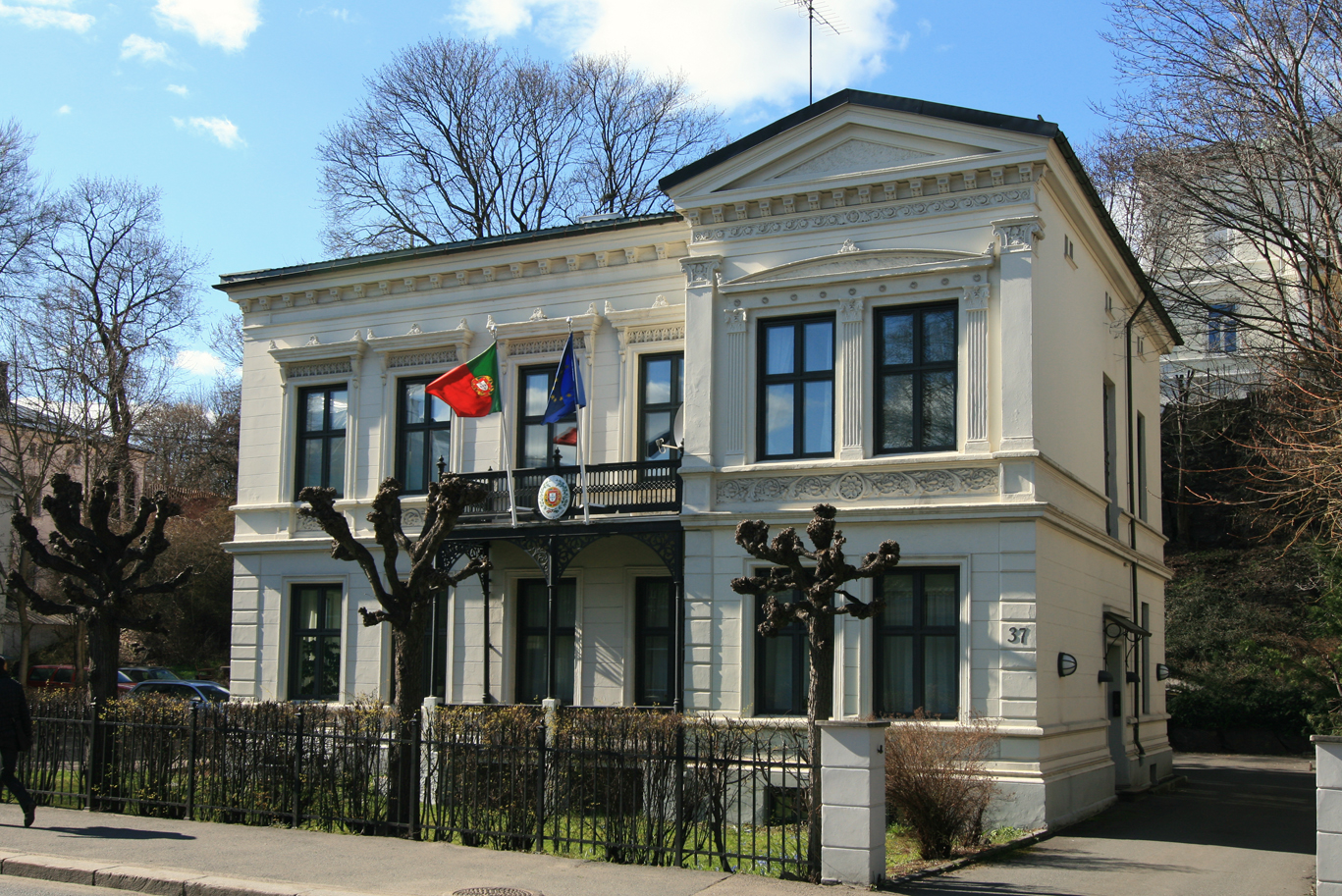
Josefines gate 37 in Oslo, which today houses the Portuguese embassy.

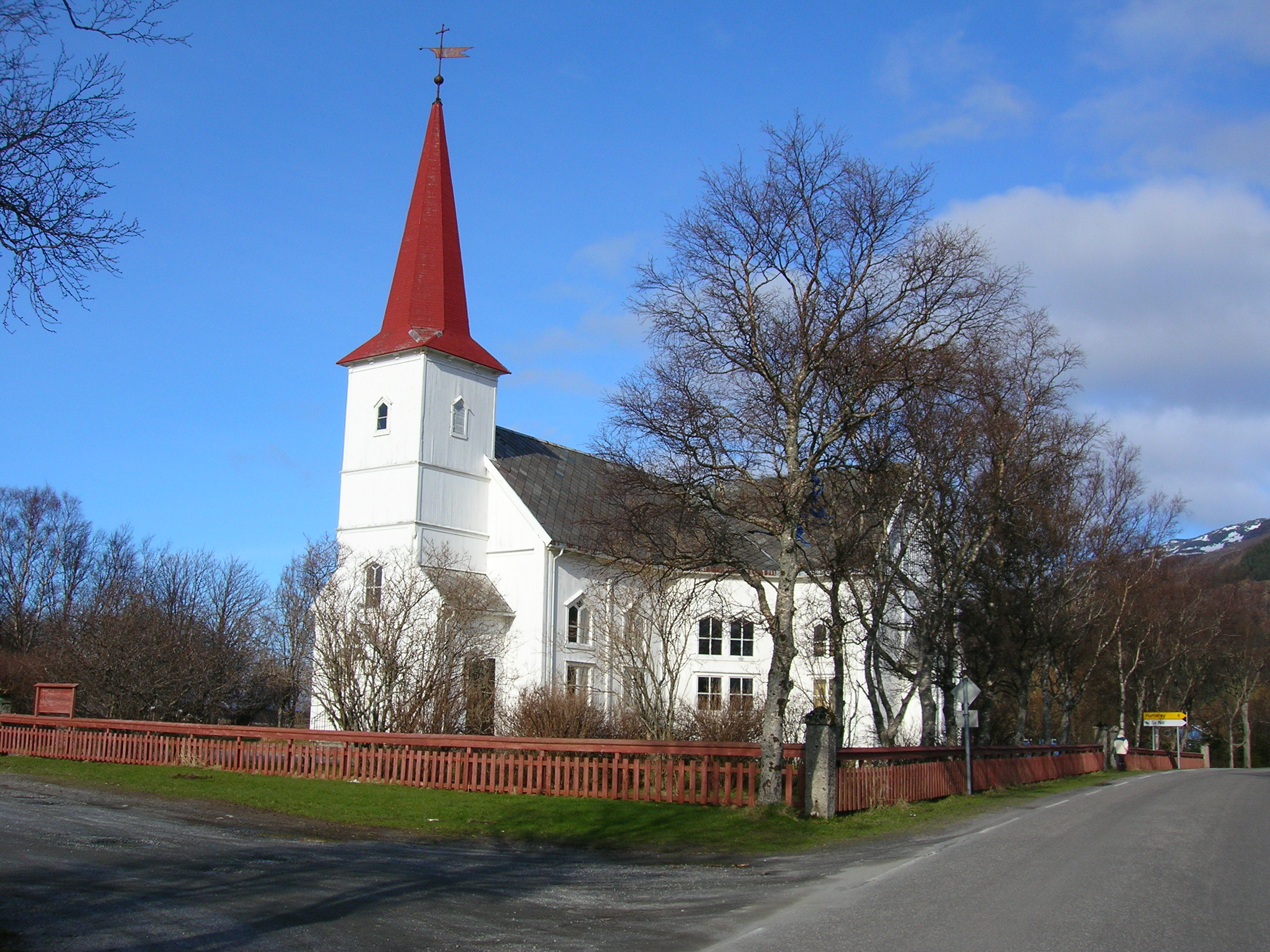
Nesna Church.

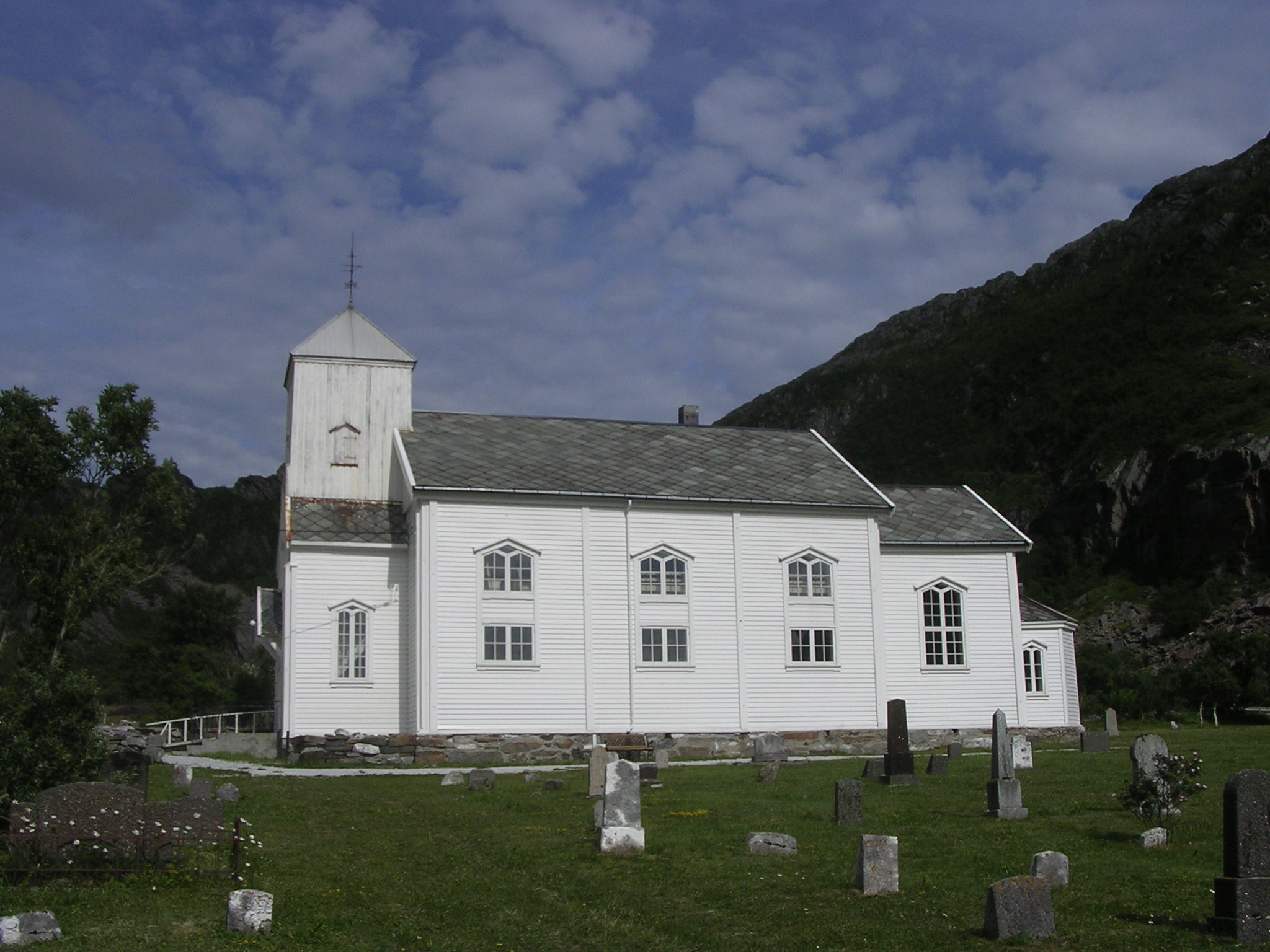
Nordvik Church.

Niels Stockfleth Darre Eckhoff (5 January 1831 – 26 September 1914) was a Norwegian architect.

He was born in Throndhjem as the son of Christian Martin Eckhoff and his wife Nicoline Johanne Luytkis. He married Nicoline Otilie Eckhoff in July 1869; the couple had several children. He was a granduncle of jurist Ernst Fredrik Eckhoff, actor Johannes Eckhoff, legal academic Torstein Eckhoff and designer Tias Eckhoff.

He attended the Royal Drawing School, now the Norwegian National Academy of Craft and Art Industry, in Oslo. He was a student of Johan Henrik Nebelong during the construction of Oscarshall, from 1847 to 1852. He studied later at the Royal Danish Academy of Fine Arts in Copenhagen. After returning from Copenhagen he was hired as an assistant at the National Academy of Craft and Art Industry. He then took various assignments in Christiania from 1860 to 1862 and in Nordland from 1862 to 1866, before the city fire in Drammen created opportunities for work there. Eckhoff was responsible for the new city hall as well as Drammen Sparebank. In 1870 he relocated to Christiania. Together with Georg Andreas Bull he designed much of the neighborhood Homansbyen. His drawings were also used for several churches in Nordland. Eckhoff resettled in Stavanger in 1910.

Eckhoff was inspired by many styles, including historicism, gothicism, neo-Gothicism and Art Nouveau.
