= Ole Svendsen Iglerød =

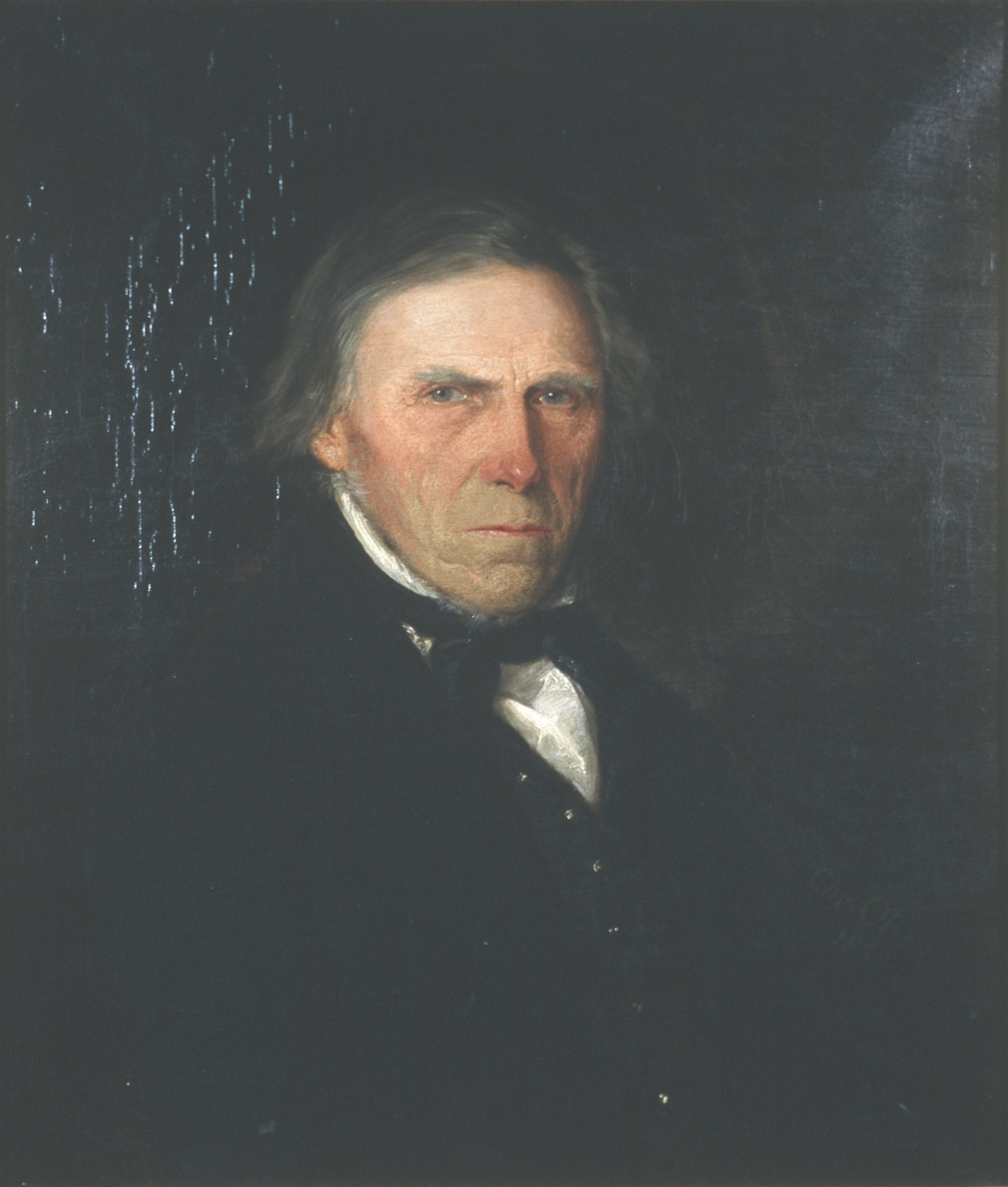
Ole Svendsen Iglerød (1784–1872), c. 1854

Ole Svendsen Iglerød (1 November 1784 – 1 November 1872) was a Norwegian soldier, farmer and politician.

Ole Iglerød was born the son of a farmer at Aremark in Østfold. He went to school in Fredrikshald. From 1808 to 1814, he served with the Norwegian Army in the Søndenfjeldske Infantry Regiment stationed at the Fredriksten Fortress. He participated, under the command of Andreas Samuel Krebs, in the skirmishes at Prestebakke and Berby in the valley of Enningdalen during the Dano-Swedish War (1808). He was involved in the Swedish–Norwegian War where he participated at the Battle of Kjølberg Bridge (1814). Wounded in battle, he was discharged from active service and returned to Aremark where he took over the family farm.

Together with Daniel Frederik Petersen, he was given the honor of representing Søndenfjeldske Infantry Regiment at the Norwegian Constituent Assembly at Eidsvoll in 1814. In 1864, he was one of four former Eidsvoll representatives (eidsvollmannen) who participated in the 50th Anniversary of the original event.

Ole Iglerød died at Rishaugen in Aremark and was buried at the Aremark Church. In 1908, a monument in his memory was unveiled in the Aremark churchyard.

== Related Reading ==
- Dahl, Per Fredrik (2011) Aremark kirke 150 år, kirkested fra 1100-tallet (Aremark menighetsråd) ISBN 978-82-303-1912-3
