= Albertus Eckhoff =

New Zealand cricketer

Personal information
- Full name: Albertus David Eckhoff
- Born: 24 June 1875; Dunedin, Otago, New Zealand
- Died: 1 April 1949 (aged 73); Wellington, New Zealand
- Role: Bowler

Domestic team information
- Years: Team
- 1899/00–1914/15: Otago
- Source: ESPNcricinfo, 8 May 2016

Albertus Eckhoff (24 June 1875 – 1 April 1949) was a New Zealand cricketer. He played 15 first-class matches for Otago between the 1899–00 and 1914–15 seasons.

Eckhoff was born at Dunedin in 1875. He worked as a blacksmith. Principally a bowler, he made his representative debut for Otago against Wellington at the Basin Reserve as a late replacement for John Harkness, although he did not take a wicket in the match and was generally considered not to be the best alternative available for Otago. Despite his performance, he retained his place for Otago's last representative match of the season, again due to other players being unavailable.

In his 15 first-class matches Eckhoff took 21 wickets, with best figures of 6/21―figures from his second representative match, a performance which The Press called "sensational", commenting that although "he sent down a lot of loose stuff, he also bowled some really good balls"; the Dunedin Evening Star's reporter was of the opinion that "he will do great things for Otago yet". As a batsman he scored a total of 112 runs wit a highest score of 19. He died suddenly at Wellington in 1949 aged 73.
