= John Harkness (cricketer) =

New Zealand cricketer

Personal information
- Full name: John Tinline Harkness
- Born: 6 April 1867; Richmond, Nelson, New Zealand
- Died: 15 December 1960 (aged 93); Christchurch, Canterbury, New Zealand

Domestic team information
- Years: Team
- 1892/93: Auckland
- 1897/98–1900/01: Otago
- Source: CricInfo, 13 May 2016

John Tinline Harkness (6 April 1867 – 15 December 1960) was a New Zealand cricketer. He played one first-class match for Auckland during the 1892–93 season and four for Otago between 1897–98 and 1900–01.

Harkness was born at Richmond in 1867 and educated at Nelson College from 1880 to 1883. He played club cricket in Nelson and by 1891 had moved to live in the Grafton area of Auckland. He scored 33 runs for Auckland Second XI in November 1891 and the Auckland Star considered him to have "the makings of a first-class bat" as well as a good rugby union three-quarter.

During the following season Harkness made his representative debut for Auckland, playing his only first-class match for the side against Otago in December 1892. The Observer described him as "a very good fast bowler" who "keeps good length as well as pace", although was of the opinion that he was only a "medium bat". He scored a total of four runs on debut and did not take a wicket in the match.

Professionally Harkness qualified as an accountant and by the end of the 1890s was working in Dunedin in Otago. He played club cricket for the Carisbrook side in the city and appeared in four first-class matches for the representative side between February 1898 and December 1900, taking four wickets. By 1905 he was living in Christchurch and was a founder member of the East Christchurch Cricket Club. He died at Christchurch in 1960 aged 93.
