= Tromsø Sparebank =

Savings bank

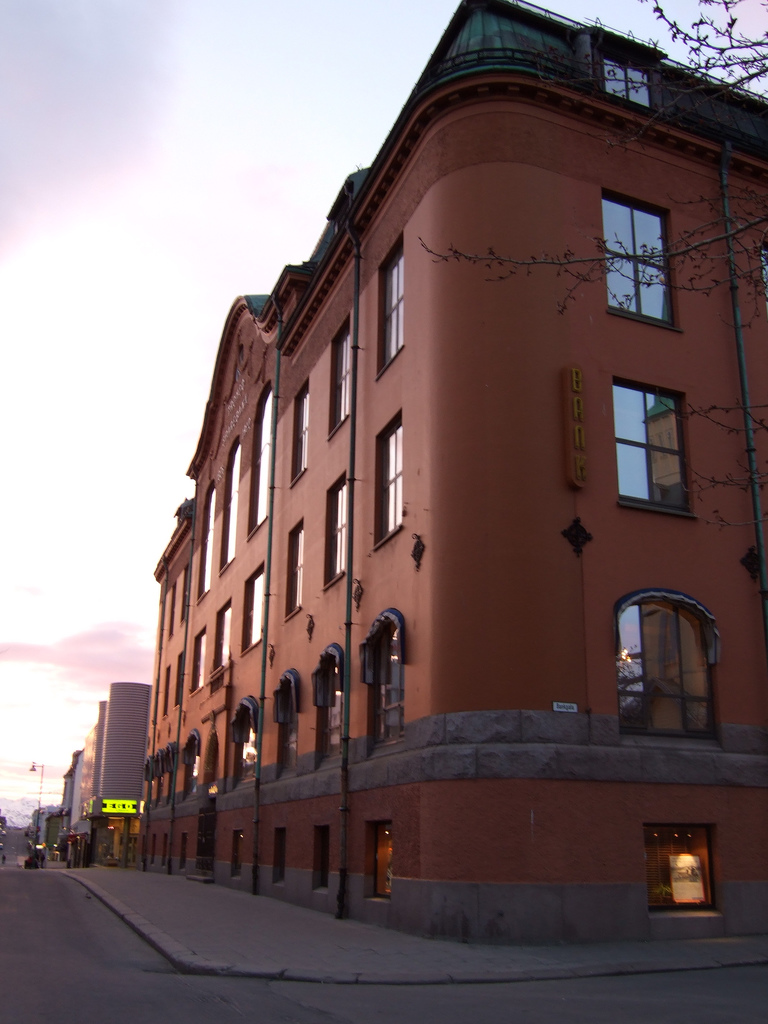
The bank's head offices

Tromsø Sparebank was a savings bank based in Tromsø, Norway. It was established in 1836 and merged with Sparebanken Nord in 1989 to form Sparebanken Nord-Norge. The bank established a branch in Longyearbyen in 1959.
