= Albertus Swanepoel =

South African milliner (1959–2024)

- Born: 12 April 1959
- Died: 25 July 2024 (aged 65)
- Occupations: Milliner and owner of Albertus Swanepoel LLC

Albertus Swanepoel (12 April 1959 – 25 July 2024) was a South African milliner based in New York City, whose hat designs featured in the runway shows of designers such as Carolina Herrera, Alexander Wang, Narciso Rodriguez, and Tommy Hilfiger. A BA Fine Arts graduate from the University of Pretoria, Swanepoel won the Coty Award as South Africa's top designer before moving to the United States in 1989.

== Biography ==
Swanepoel launched a range of made-to-measure clothing under his Quartus Manna label in 1983 before starting a glove business in New York City in 1992. While continuing with the glove business, he started evening millinery classes and pursued various freelance millinery jobs while making his own hats on the side. Among his freelance collaborations he worked with theatrical milliner Lynne Mackey, constructing hats for several Broadway shows, including Kiss Me, Kate and Mamma Mia!.

In 2004, Swanepoel collaborated with Marc by Marc Jacobs for a Fall hat collection, and the following year worked with Proenza Schouler on hats for a Spring collection. In 2006 he started his own company, Albertus Swanepoel LLC, which sells namesake collections to selected USA retail stores and to several international markets. His designs have been featured in publications such as Vogue, Harper’s Bazaar, Time, Glamour, The Wall Street Journal and The New York Times.

Swanepoel died on 25 July 2024, at the age of 65.

== Awards ==
- 2008: Runner-up in the Vogue/CFDA Fashion Fund Awards
- 2009: Nominated as Accessory Designer in CFDA/Swarovski Awards
- 2010: Accessory Designer Award: African Fashion week International / nominated as Accessory Designer in WGSN Awards
- 2014: University of Pretoria Alumni Laureate Award

== Sources ==
- http://albertusswanepoel.com/#/life
- https://www.safashionweek.co.za
