= Canturi =

Australian jewellery fine brand

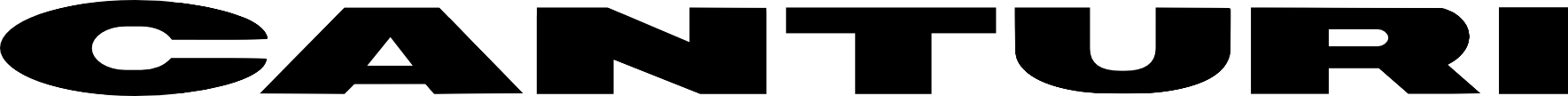

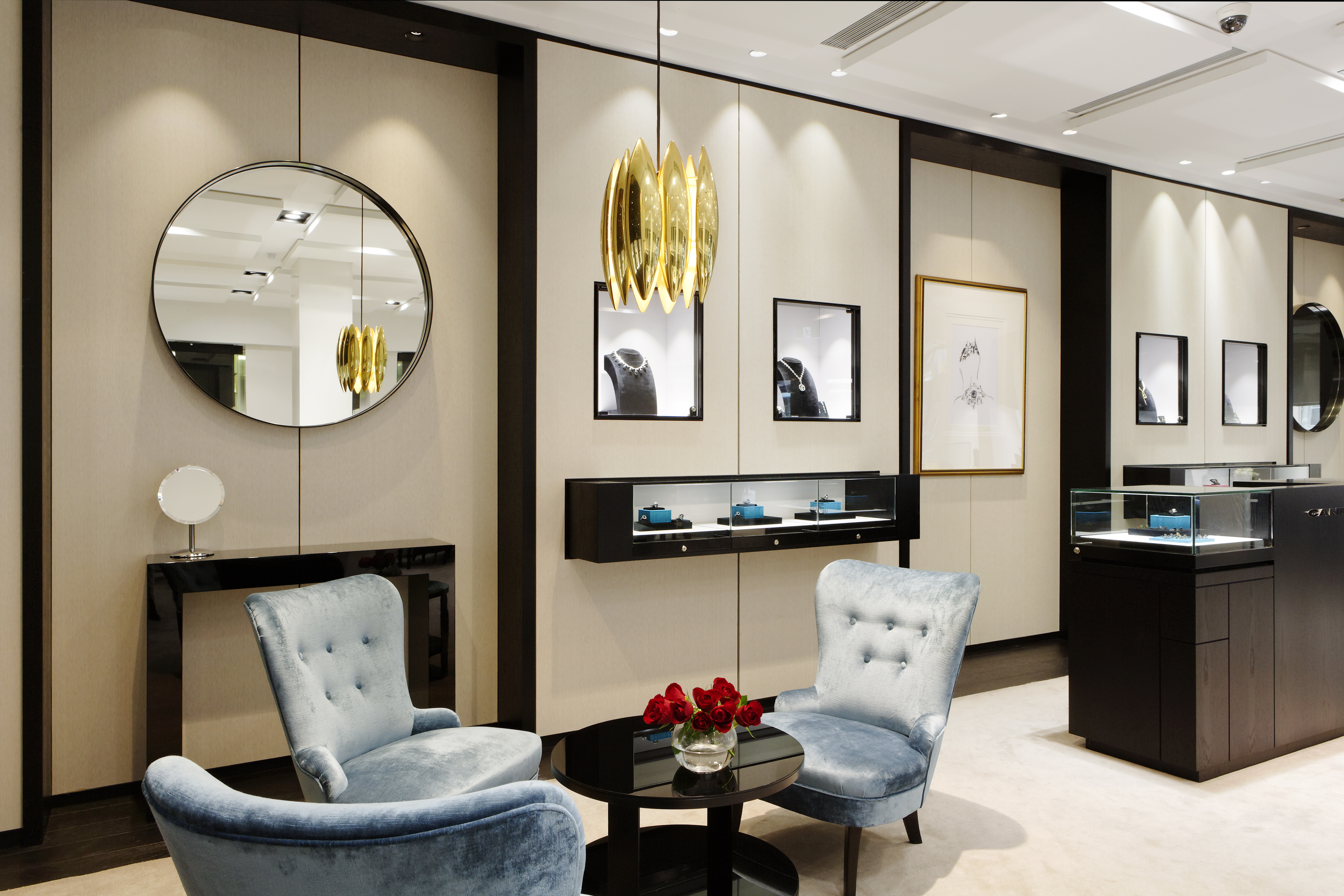
- Canturi's Brisbane salon in 2013
- Type: Private company
- Founded: 1986
- Founder: Stefano Canturi
- Headquarters: Australia
- Products: Jewellery and timepieces
- Website: canturi.com

Canturi, officially Canturi Jewels, is an Australian fine jewellery brand founded in Sydney in 1986 by designer Stefano Canturi. Known for incorporating aspects of Cubism into their designs, Canturi created the Satine diamond necklace worn by Nicole Kidman in Moulin Rouge! (2001), which holds the record for the most valuable piece of jewellery ever created for a film, as well as the Barbie by Stefano Canturi, the most expensive Barbie doll ever sold at auction.

== History ==
Stefano Canturi was born in Sydney, Australia, to parents of Italian heritage. He began designing jewellery professionally at 21, and established Canturi Jewels in Sydney in 1986. In 1991, Canturi launched the Cubism collection, featuring geometric shapes and angular settings referencing the early twentieth-century art movement of the same name. In 2003, Canturi was appointed by Cartier to design jewels.

Canturi has boutiques in Sydney, Melbourne, and Brisbane. In 2009, Canturi expanded to Las Vegas and New York City, where they opened a boutique on Manhattan's 66th Street.

== Products ==
=== Jewellery ===
For Baz Luhrmann's 2001 film Moulin Rouge!, Canturi was commissioned to design a necklace to be worn by Nicole Kidman. The necklace was conceived by Luhrmann and his wife, Catherine Martin. Canturi spent several weeks researching late nineteenth-century French jewellery before producing the design. The necklace, known as Satine, was handcrafted in 18-carat white gold and set with 1,308 diamonds totalling 134 carats, with a 5-carat emerald-cut diamond as the centrepiece and a 2.5-carat cabochon-cut Sri Lankan blue sapphire clasp. Three months of fittings were required, during which a mould of Kidman's neck and cleavage was taken.

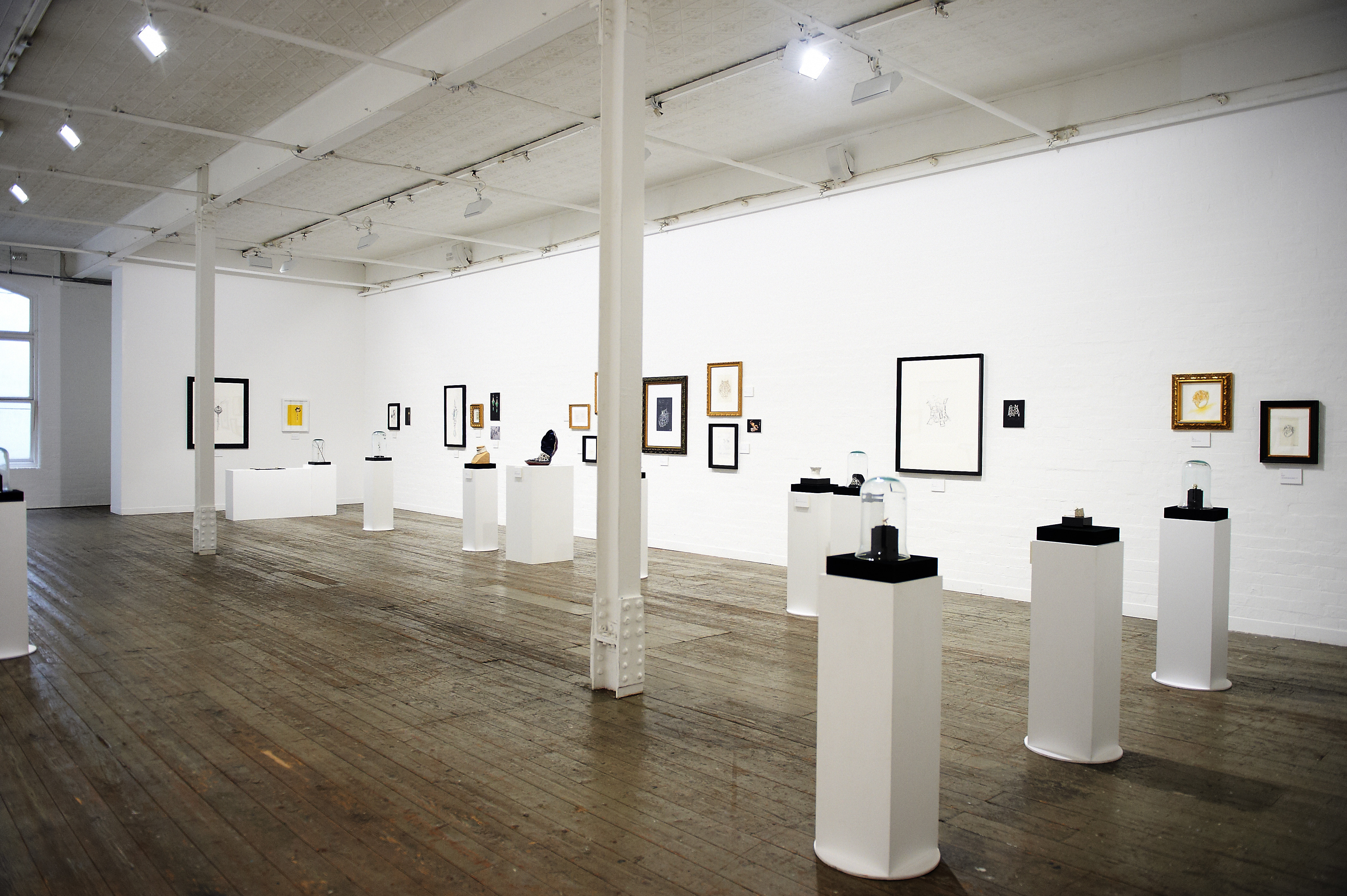
Canturi Journey exhibition in 2013

Because of the necklace's value — estimated at US$1 million by Christie's at the time of production, and described by Luhrmann as worth US$2.5 million — a replica in silver and crystals with a magnetic clasp was produced for the scene in which the necklace is torn from Kidman's neck. Two security guards were stationed on set whenever the real necklace was present. The necklace was entered into the Guinness World Records as the most valuable piece of jewellery ever created for a film. After the film's release, it appeared on The Oprah Winfrey Show, on the cover of Harper's Bazaar, and in Vogue. Satine was later withdrawn from a Christie's auction and was then used in various fashion shoots. The piece was displayed at a Canturi art exhibition, Journey, in 2013, and was the inspiration for a later Canturi collection, the Rouge Jewels.

In addition to Moulin Rouge!, Canturi jewellery appeared in The Matrix (1999), The Night We Called It a Day (2003), and Australia (2008). Canturi jewellery has been worn by Oprah Winfrey (for whom Canturi designed a diamond "O" pendant), Kylie Minogue, Linda Evangelista, Britney Spears, and Jennifer Lopez. In 2011, Canturi produced a jewelled realisation of a 1926 Erté design originally created for George White's Broadway production of Scandals. The piece, known as the Clasp, is an evening bag set with 3,978 diamonds, 20 ounces of gold, black sapphires, rubies, and pearl tassels, carrying a price of US$780,000. It was exhibited at the Martin Lawrence Galleries and Caesars Palace.

==== Barbie by Stefano Canturi ====
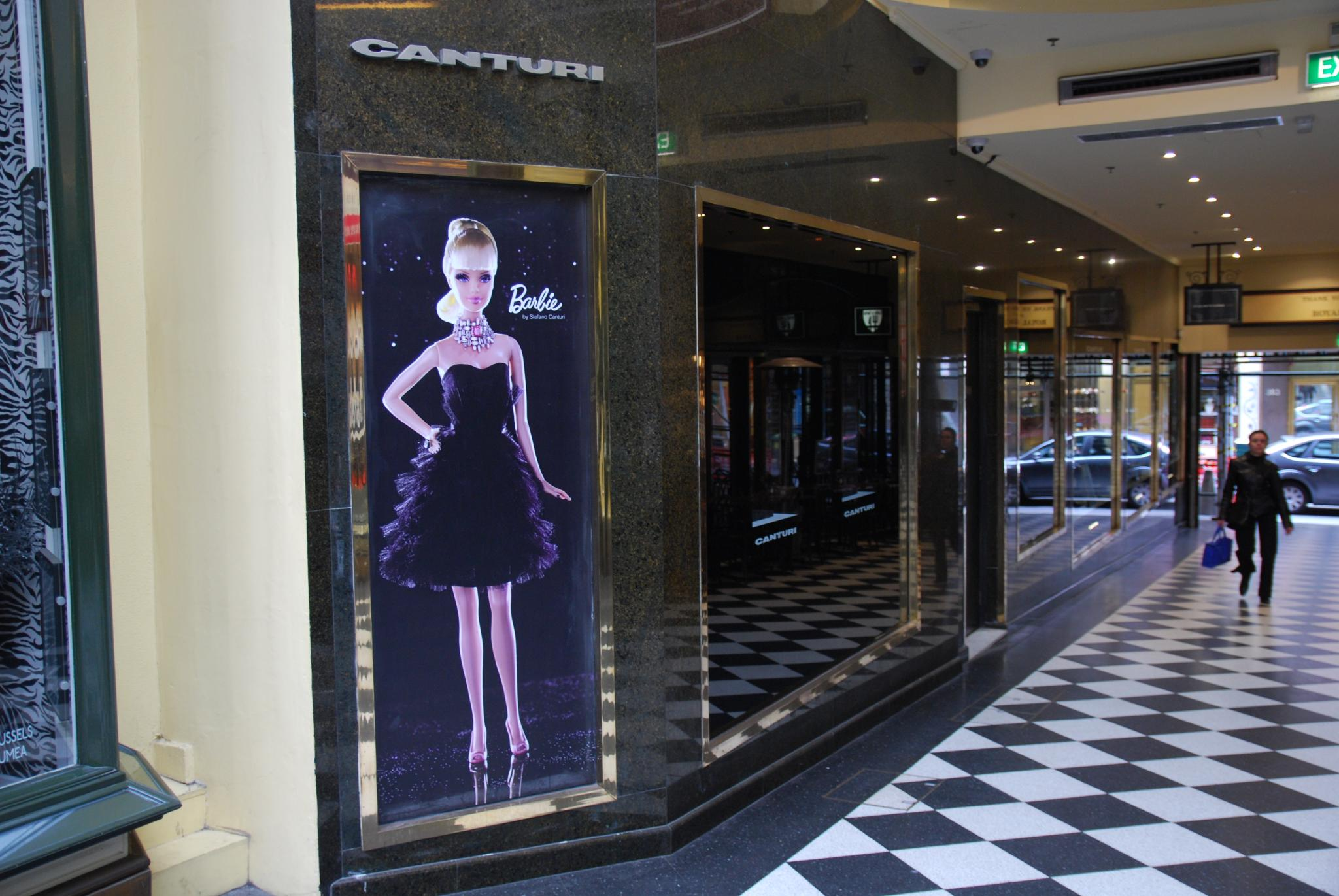
The doll advertised at Canturi's Melbourne boutique in 2010

In 2010, Mattel commissioned Canturi to design jewellery for a one-of-a-kind Barbie doll to be auctioned in aid of the Breast Cancer Research Foundation. Canturi spent six months on the doll, which wore a strapless little black dress and a necklace set with three carats of white diamonds surrounding a one-carat square emerald-cut pink diamond from the Argyle diamond mine, along with a matching pink diamond ring.

Barbie by Stefano Canturi was sold at Christie's in New York City on 20 October 2010 to an anonymous buyer for US$302,500, a Guinness World Record for the most expensive Barbie doll ever sold at auction. Until 2026, the doll also held the record for the most expensive toy ever sold at auction.

==== Estate of Melissa Caddick ====
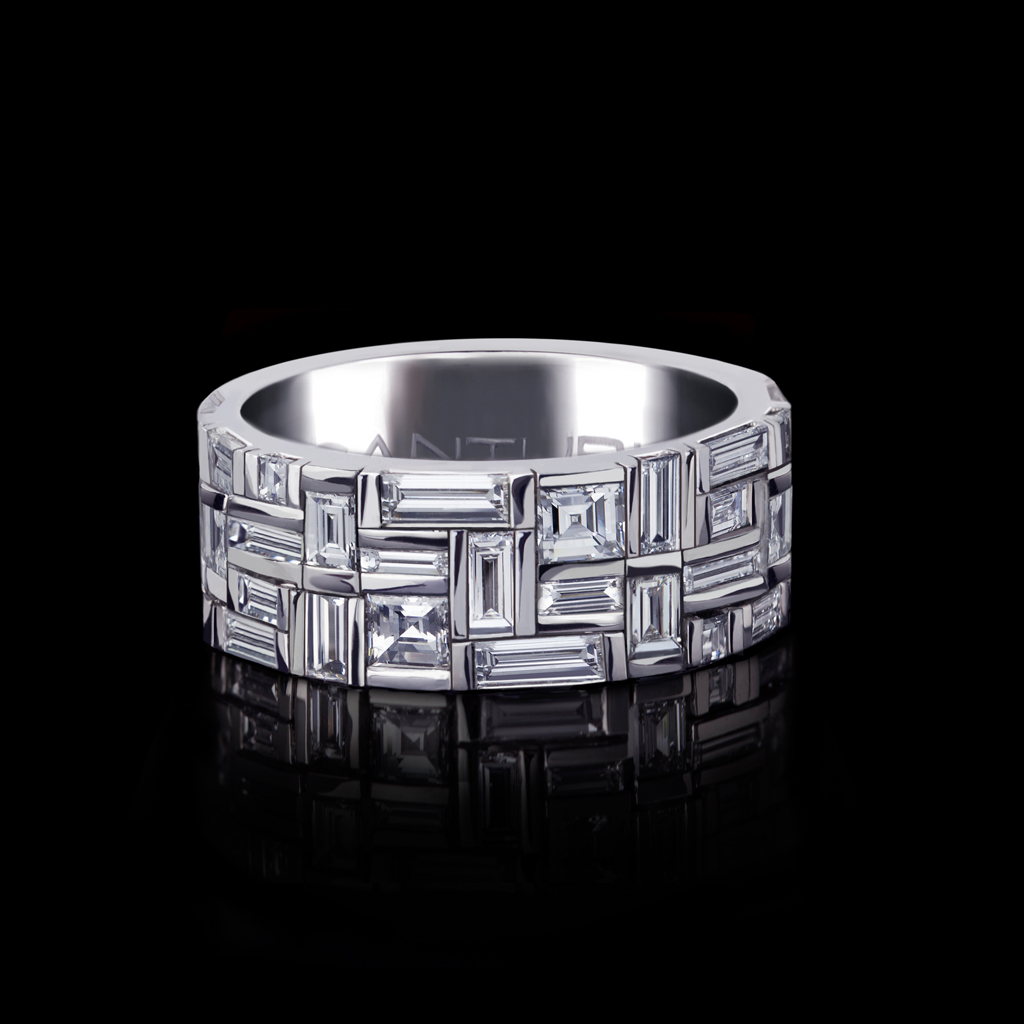
A Cubism-style Canturi diamond ring

In December 2022, 47 pieces of Canturi jewellery were sold at auction as part of the liquidation of assets belonging to the estate of Melissa Caddick, an Australian fraudster who disappeared in November 2020 following an Australian Securities and Investments Commission raid on her home in connection with a Ponzi scheme. All 47 lots sold, with the Caddick property realising over 175% above reserve prices.

Pieces sold at the auction include Stella, a $370,000 diamond and black sapphire necklace, and Aqualina, a Cubism-inspired necklace valued at over $400,000. The auction house described it as "the most magnificent and comprehensive collection of jewels by the renowned Australian jewellery designer Canturi ever to be offered at auction".

=== Timepieces ===
In 2024, following three years of development across Switzerland, Italy, and Australia, Canturi launched its first timepiece, the Cubism High Jewel Watch, with production limited to 15 pieces per year. Valued at $530,000, the watch contains more than 50 carats of natural baguette and carré cut diamonds. After being worn by singer Troye Sivan at the 2024 ARIA Music Awards, the watch was sold to a buyer in Brisbane.

After the initial launch, Canturi went on to produce and sell 20 timepieces inspired by the Cubism High Jewel Watch, the cheapest of which was listed for $23,500. Canturi later produced a second distinct watch design, the Cubism Bracciale, valued at $97,000.
