= Arnold Holmboe =

Norwegian politician

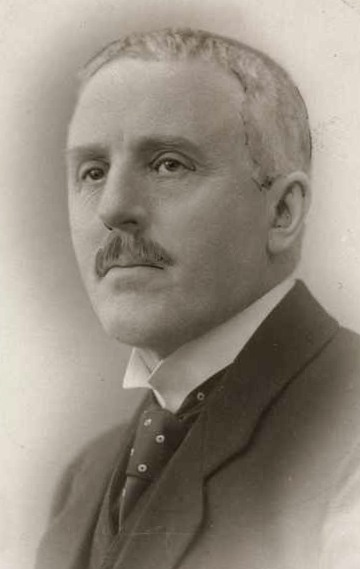
- Holmboe in ca. 1925 or 1935.

Minister of Finance
- In office 25 July 1924 – 5 March 1926
- Prime Minister: J. L. Mowinckel
- Preceded by: Abraham Berge
- Succeeded by: Fredrik L. Konow

Minister of Justice
- In office 24 August 1922 – 6 March 1923
- Prime Minister: Otto Blehr
- Preceded by: Olaf Amundsen
- Succeeded by: Otto B. Halvorsen

Personal details
- Born: 11 March 1873 Beitstad, Nord-Trøndelag, Sweden-Norway
- Died: 27 July 1956 (aged 83) Oslo, Norway
- Party: Liberal
- Spouse: Dagmar Theodore Dahlmann (m. 1904)
- Children: 1

Arnold Holmboe (11 March 1873 – 27 July 1956) was a Norwegian politician for the Liberal Party. He was mayor of Tromsø, two-term member of the Norwegian Parliament as well as Minister of Justice from 1922 to 1923 and Minister of Finance from 1924 to 1926.

== Personal life ==
He was born in Malm as the son of farmer Anton Christian Holmboe (1839–1911) and his wife Elen Berthine Arntsdatter Stjernen (1849–1902). He had several younger sisters. He was a distant relative of Otto Holmboe (1710–1773), and his grandfather Hans Fredrik was a third cousin of academics Bernt Michael and Christopher Andreas Holmboe.

In 1904, Arnold Holmboe married Dagmar Theodora Dahlmann. The couple had one son.

== Career ==
He took higher education, graduated as cand.jur. in 1900 and then worked in Steigen for one year and Harstad for two years. In 1903 he was hired as an attorney in Tromsø. He was a member of Tromsø city council from 1907 to 1922, serving as mayor in the periods 1907 to 1908, 1913 to 1914 and 1916 to 1917. He was also CEO of the local savings bank Tromsø Sparebank from 1913 to 1928.

He was elected to the Norwegian Parliament in 1922, representing the Market towns of Nordland, Troms and Finnmark. On 24 August the same year, he was appointed Minister of Justice and the Police in the second cabinet Blehr. His seat in Parliament was taken by Knut Nilsen Evanger. Holmboe later lost the job when the second cabinet Blehr fell in March 1923. However, in July 1924 Holmboe returned as Minister of Finance and Customs in the first cabinet Mowinckel. That cabinet fell in March 1926. Holmboe then stood for election to Parliament and served one last term from 1928 to 1930.

From 1928 to 1943, he was the CEO of Vinmonopolet.

As a part of the legal purge in Norway after World War II, Holmboe was a member of the Undersøkelseskommisjonen av 1945.

Political offices
Preceded by Olaf Amundsen	Norwegian Minister of Justice and the Police; 1922–1923	Succeeded by Otto Bahr Halvorsen
Preceded by Abraham Berge	Norwegian Minister of Finance and Customs; 1924–1926	Succeeded by Fredrik Ludvig Konow
