= Tias Eckhoff =

Norwegian industrial designer

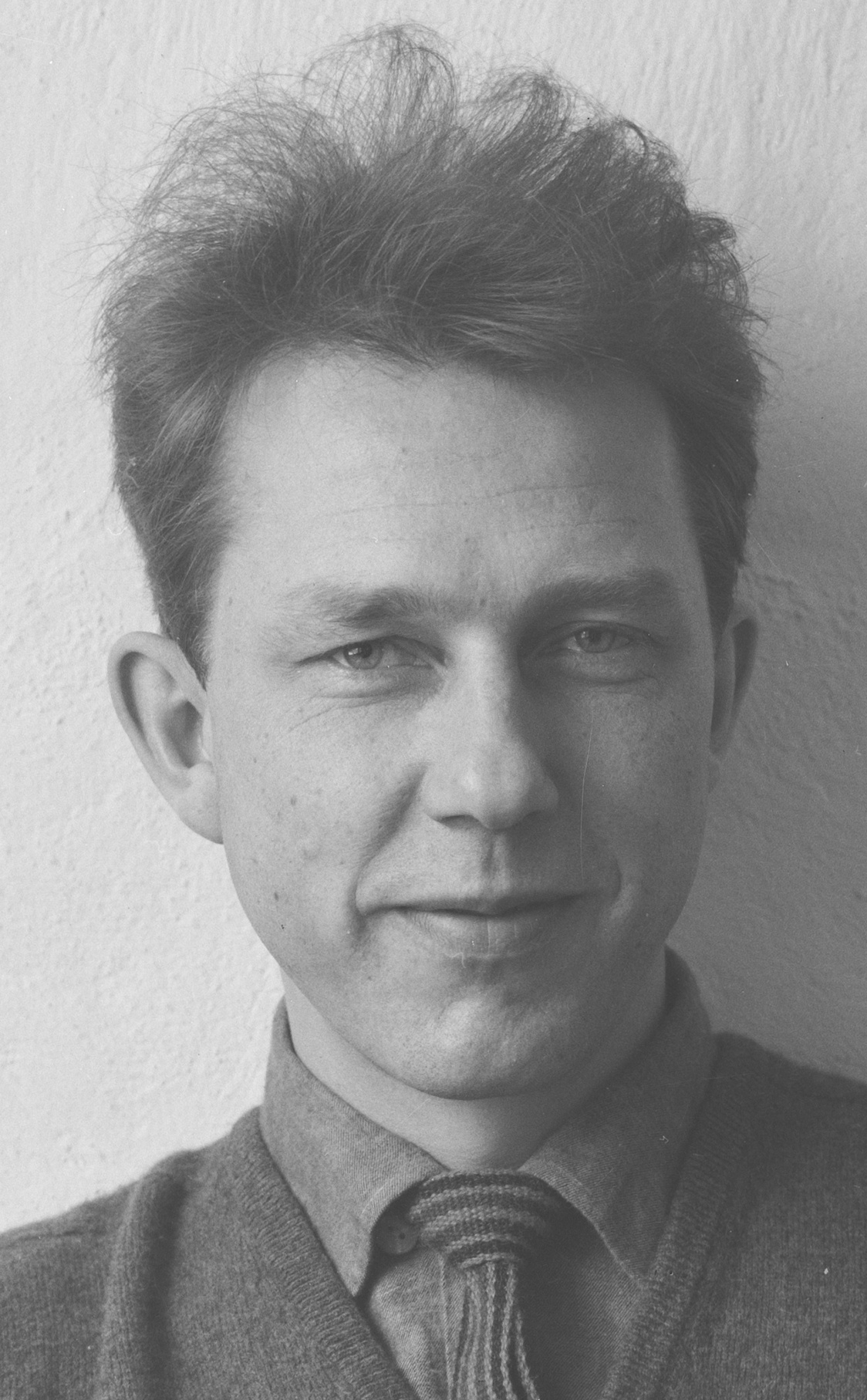

Mathias Gerhard "Tias" Eckhoff (25 June 1926 – 30 January 2016) was a Norwegian industrial designer.

== Personal life ==
Born in Vestre Slidre Municipality on 25 June 1926, Eckhoff was a son of shipmaster Trygve Eckhoff and Sigrid Einang, and was a brother of Torstein Eckhoff. He married Janicke Didrichsen in 1952.

== Career ==
He worked as designer for Porsgrunds Porselænsfabrik from 1949. Among his designs are Det riflede from 1952, Maya from 1961, and Una from 1973. He is represented in various museums, including the Museum of Modern Art in New York City, and the Victoria and Albert Museum in London. He was awarded the Lunning Prize in 1953. His designs won gold medals at the Triennale in Milan in 1954, 1957, and 1960.

== Death ==
Eckhoff died in Gjøvik on 30 January 2016.
