= Arne Bergsgård =

Norwegian historian and educator

Arne Bergsgård (18 April 1886 – 18 June 1954) was a Norwegian historian and educator.

== Biography ==
Arne Bergsgård was born in Vestre Slidre Municipality in Oppland and grew up in Vang Municipality, Norway. He was the son of Asle Bergsgård and Ingeborg Thune. He attended high school in Fredrikstad, where he graduated in 1904. In 1910, he received his philology degree. He served as a teacher from 1911 to 1914 in Volda, and from 1914 to 1922 at Stord. In 1922, he was appointed a senior lecturer in history at the Norwegian College of General Sciences in Trondheim. He earned his PhD in 1933 with a thesis on Ole Gabriel Ueland, and in 1935 he became a professor. He was rector of the college from 1937 to 1953. He was a board member of Noregs Mållag from 1929 to 1936.

During the occupation of Norway by Nazi Germany he joined the resistance movement, editing the underground publication I krigstid. He was a member of the postwar investigation committee, Undersøkelseskommisjonen av 1945, where he wrote the appendix on the Norwegian Government's Foreign Policy up to April 1940.

As a historian, he concentrated largely on the 19th century, primarily the emergence of Norwegian national identity. He became a member of Royal Norwegian Society of Sciences and Letters in 1926 and the Norwegian Academy of Science and Letters in 1938. He was decorated Knight, First Class of the Order of St. Olav in 1950.
