= Ole Hallesby =

Norwegian Lutheran theologian, author and educator

Ole Kristian Hallesby
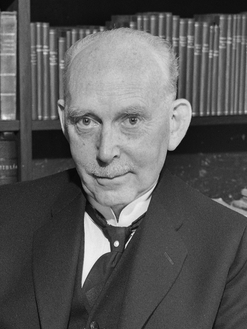
- Born: 5 August 1879; Aremark, Norway
- Died: 22 November 1961 (aged 82)
- Occupations: theologian, ethicist, teacher, preacher, writer

Ole Kristian Hallesby (5 August 1879 – 22 November 1961) was a conservative, Norwegian Lutheran theologian, author and educator.

== Biography ==
Ole Kristian Hallesby was born in Aremark, in Østfold, Norway. Hallesby grew up as the sixth of eight siblings on a family farm with a father also served as an assistant pastor. His family was from the Lutheran piety of the Haugean heritage. He graduated with a degree in theology in 1903 and was awarded his doctorate in 1909.

Ole Kristian Hallesby taught at the Free Faculty of Theology from 1909 to 1952. He was chairman of the Norwegian Santal Mission 1902-1906 and chairman of the Norwegian Lutheran Inner Mission Society (Det norske lutherske Indremisjonsselskap) from 1923 to 1956. He was also central to the founding of Norwegian Christian Student and School Association in 1924.

== Nazi occupation of Norway ==
An outspoken opponent of the Nazi occupation of Norway, he was arrested and detained at Grini concentration camp for two years (until the end of the war). During a razzia in November 1948 it was revealed that the already-imprisoned Nazi agents, Gard Holtskog, Sten Blom Westberg and Hans Johann Krijom, were about to fabricate a document which probably was supposed to tie Hallesby to the Nazis.

== Hell debate ==
In 1953, a radio speech by Hallesby caused a major debate in Norway on the existence of hell. In the speech, Hallesby spoke to the non-religious that if you fell dead to the floor this moment, you fall at the same time into hell, and how can you who is unconverted lie down calmly to sleep at night, you who don't know if you'll wake up in your bed or in hell?

The speech was condemned on the front page of Dagbladet the following day, and criticisms were raised against NRK for hosting Hallesby's speech. NRK responded that since there was a state church, they had to accept it as it was. Within the church, the debate ignited a conflict between liberal and literal interpretations of the Bible. The bishop of Hamar Kristian Schjelderup was the main spokesperson for the liberal side who argued that the damnation of hell was incompatible with a religion of love. Most of the church supported Hallesby's view of hell, though some did not support the wording in his speech. The debate also brought up questions whether there ought to be a state church. The debate may also have catalyzed the formation of the Norwegian Humanist Association.

== Bibliography (US editions) ==
Hallesby wrote 67 books, mostly on theology and ethics, but is known for devotional writings.

- The Christian Life: In The Light of the Cross (1922)
- Infant baptism and adult conversion: An exposition of the relation between… (1924)
- Why I Am A Christian (1925)
- The Christian Home (1926)
- Prayer (1931)
- Conscience (1933)
- Under His Wings (1933, 3rd ed.)
- God's Word For Today: A Devotional Book For The Home (1937)
- Religious or Christian (1939)
- Temperament & the Christian Faith (1962, reprint)

== See also ==
- Hans Nielsen Hauge
- MF Norwegian School of Theology

== Related Reading ==
- Aarnes, Asbjørn; Bjerkeset, Ole Andreas (2002) Gjensyn med Hallesby (Lunde Forlag AS) ISBN 82-520-3574-4
