= Johannes Eckhoff =

Norwegian actor

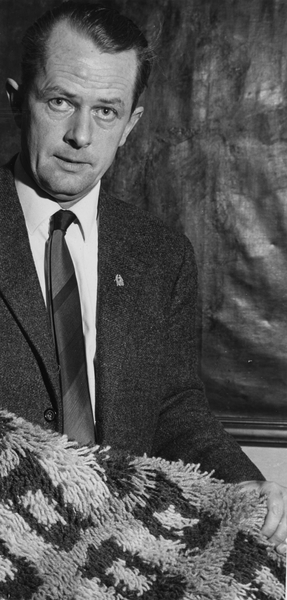
- Born: 26 April 1919
- Died: 26 October 2007 (aged 88); Spain

Johannes Nicolai Eckhoff (26 April 1919 – 26 October 2007) was a Norwegian actor. He made his stage debut at Trøndelag Teater in 1939, and had later worked for Centralteatret, Det Nye Teater and Riksteatret. He participated in the film Englandsfarere in 1946, and in Kampen om tungtvannet from 1948. He contributed to several radio and television series for children at the Norwegian Broadcasting Corporation.
