= Sverre Steen =

Norwegian historian (1898–1983)

Sverre Steen (1 August 1898 – 23 June 1983) was a Norwegian historian and professor at the University of Oslo from 1938 to 1965. He served as president of the Norwegian Historical Association from 1936 to 1947.

== Biography ==
Steen was born in Bergen, Norway. He was the son of Johan Martin Nilsen Steen (1863–1955) and Bertha Kathrine Hopland (1858–1927). He was a student at Bergen Cathedral School from 1911 to 1916. He attended the University of Oslo from 1918 where he was mentored by professor of history Edvard Bull Sr. (1881-1932).

After graduating from the university in 1924, Steen became a lecturer at Trondheim Cathedral School. Steen was a fellow at the University of Oslo from 1927 and became a lecturer of history in 1933. He replaced Halvdan Koht and assumed the position of professor of history in 1938. He held this position until 1965. He was a member of the Norwegian Historical Association. He served as president of the organization from 1936 to 1947 and served as chairman of the committee for historic knowledge from 1963 until 1970.

During the occupation of Norway by Nazi Germany he was imprisoned in Bredtveit concentration camp from 15 October 1943, then in Berg concentration camp from 22 to 25 November 1943.

Steen was best known to the general public through his NRK radio series Langsomt ble landet vårt eget from 1967. He wrote four volumes of Det norske folks liv og historie (1930-1935), was main editor for the three volume work on Norway's role during World War II, Norges krig 1940–45 (1947-1950), and wrote a five volumes work on the period from 1814 to 1836, Det frie Norge (1951-1962).

Steen was a member of the Norwegian Academy of Science and Letters from 1937 and of the Royal Swedish Academy of Letters, History and Antiquities from 1948. He received his honorary doctorate at the University of Aarhus in 1954. He was decorated Commander of the Order of St. Olav in 1965.

== Personal life ==
He was married to Ellisiv Steen (1908–2001). She was a literary researcher and professor at the University of Oslo. They were the parents of four sons.

In 1995 the Sverre Steen Prize (Sverre Steen-prisen) was founded in his honor. The prize was instituted by the Norwegian Historical Association and J. W. Cappelens Forlag. It is awarded annually to a person or group who has excelled with outstanding dissemination of history at a high academic level in book form or other media.

== Selected works ==
- Riksrådsforhandlingene 1940 (1947)
- Det frie Norge 1814 (1951)
- På fallittens rand (1953)
- Krise og avspenning (1954)
- Det gamle samfunn (1957)
- Konge og Storting (1962)
- Grev Wedels stattholdertid (1972)
- Drømmen om frihet (1973)
- Langsomt ble landet vårt eget (1967)
