= Nord-Herøy =

Island in Nordland, Norway

- Interactive map of Nord-Herøy

Geography
- Location: Nordland, Norway
- Coordinates: 65.9895°N 12.3038°E
- Archipelago: Herøy
- Area: 8.9 km^{2} (3.4 sq mi)
- Length: 6.7 km (4.16 mi)
- Width: 2.6 km (1.62 mi)
- Highest elevation: 48 m (157 ft)
- Highest point: Brannåsen

Administration
- Norway
- County: Nordland
- Municipality: Herøy Municipality

Demographics
- Population: appx 800 (2017)

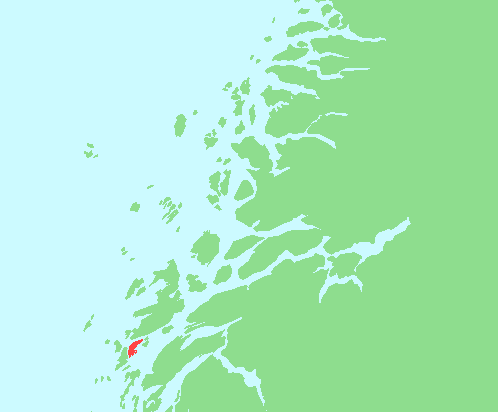
Locator map of Nord-Herøy, Nordland, Norway

Nord-Herøy (lit. 'North Herøy') is an island in Herøy Municipality in Nordland county, Norway. With an area of 8.9 square kilometers (3.4 sq mi), it is the largest island in the municipality. The island has about 800 residents (in 2017).

To the southwest lies the Herøysundet (lit. 'Herøy Strait'), which is crossed by the Herøysund Bridge and Norwegian County Road 828 to the neighboring island of Sør-Herøy. To the southeast of the island lies the Alsten Fjord (Alstenfjorden) and the island of Alsten in Alstahaug Municipality. To the east-northeast lies the island of Hjartøya, and to the north lies the Dønnessundet (lit. 'Dønnes Strait') and the island of Dønna. To the northwest is the island of Hestøya, with bridge connections to the nearby islands of Indre Øksningan, Ytre Øksningan, Staulen, and Seløya, and to the Åkviksundet Bridge to Dønna.

The municipal seat, Silvalen, is located on the island along Herøysundet.

There are three lakes on the island: Storvatnet, Salsvatnet, and Vikvatnet.

== See also ==
- List of islands of Norway
