= Herøy =

Herøy, Heroy, or Herøya may refer to:

== Places ==
- Herøy Municipality (Møre og Romsdal), a municipality in Møre og Romsdal county, Norway
- Herøy Municipality (Nordland), a municipality in Nordland county, Norway
- Herøya, a suburb of the city of Porsgrunn in Telemark county, Norway

=== Churches ===
- Herøy Church, a church in Herøy Municipality in Møre og Romsdal county, Norway
- Herøy Church (Nordland), a church in Herøy Municipality in Nordland county, Norway
- Herøya Church, a church in Porsgrunn Municipality in Telemark county, Norway

== People ==
- Heroy Clarke, a Jamaican politician
- Chris Heroy, an American stock car racing crew chief

== Other ==
- Herøy Bridge, a bridge in Herøy Municipality in Møre og Romsdal county, Norway
- Herøy Open Air Museum, a museum in Herøy Municipality in Nordland county, Norway
