= Tenna (disambiguation) =

Tenna (天和) is a Japanese era name for a period spanning the years from 1681 through 1684.

Tenna may also refer to:

== Places ==
- Tenna, Nordland, an island in Nordland county, Norway
- Tenna, Switzerland, a former municipality in Switzerland
- Tenna, Trentino, a municipality in Trentino, Italy
- Tenna, Sri Lanka, a village in Sri Lanka
- Tenna (river), a river in Marche, Italy, flowing into the Adriatic Sea

== Other uses ==
- Tenna (Deltarune), a character from Chapter 3 of the video game Deltarune
