= Staulen =

Island in Nordland, Norway

- Interactive map of Staulen

Geography
- Location: Nordland, Norway
- Coordinates: 66.0320°N 12.2802°E
- Area: 2.6 km^{2} (1.0 sq mi)
- Length: 2.7 km (1.68 mi)
- Width: 1.6 km (0.99 mi)
- Highest elevation: 54 m (177 ft)
- Highest point: Staulhamren

Administration
- Norway
- County: Nordland
- Municipality: Herøy Municipality

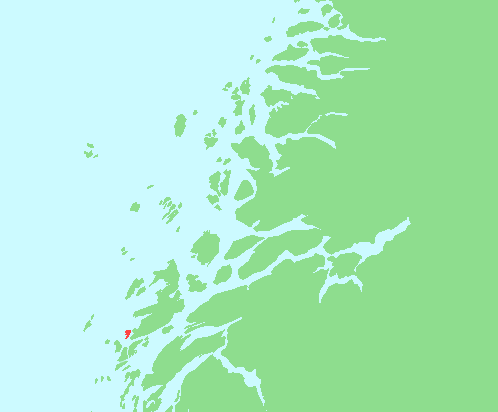
Locator map of Staulen, Norway

Staulen is an island in Herøy Municipality in Nordland county, Norway. The 2.6-square-kilometre (1.0 sq mi) island just southwest of the large island of Dønna. The settlements on the island include the villages of Nordstaulen, Sørstaulen, and Sandvikja.

The Åkviksundet (lit. 'Åkvik Strait') lies between the islands of Staulen and Dønna and the Åkviksundet Bridge and Norwegian County Road 828 connect the two islands. The road continues south through Staulen before crossing various smaller islands, including Landvindsøya, Skardsøya, and Kjeøya, before crossing the Hoholmen Bridge on its way to the main island of Nord-Herøy.

== See also ==
- List of islands of Norway
