= Norwegian County Road 161 =

County road in Nordland, Norway

County Road 161

Route information
- Length: 6.67 km (4.14 mi)

Major junctions
- North end: Fv828 Kjerkåsen
- South end: Tennvalen

Location
- Country: Norway
- Counties: Nordland

Highway system
- Roads in Norway; National Roads; County Roads

County Road 161 (Norwegian: Fylkesvei 161) is a 6.67-kilometer (4.14 mi) road in Nordland County, Norway. It is also locally named Sør-Herøyveien (lit. 'South Herøy Road'). It is located in Herøy Municipality and it connects Kjerkåsen to the island of Tennvalen. The road follows the southeast coast of the island of Sør-Herøy, crosses a bridge over the Tennsundet strait, and then continues southwest along the length of the island of Tenna, terminating at the island of Tennvalen.
