= Norwegian County Road 828 =

County road in Nordland, Norway

County Road 828

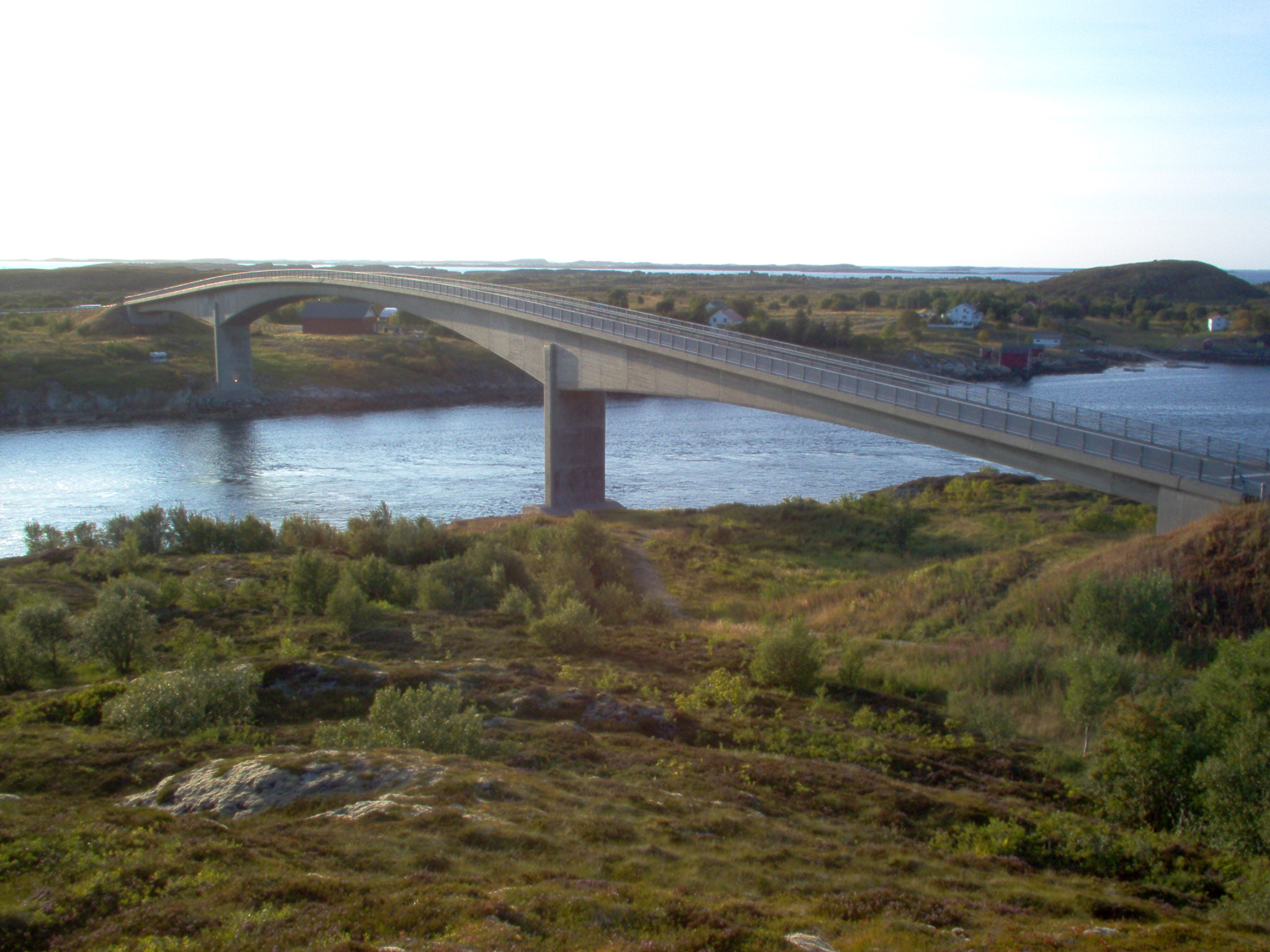
- Åkviksundet Bridge viewed from Dønna

Route information
- Length: 33.6 km (20.9 mi)

Major junctions
- North end: Fv809 Bjørn
- Fv165 at Sør-Staulen; Fv166 at Hestøya; Fv162 at Herøy School (Sentralskolen); Fv161 at Kjerkåsen
- South end: Flostad

Location
- Country: Norway
- Counties: Nordland

Highway system
- Roads in Norway; National Roads; County Roads

County Road 828 (Norwegian: Fylkesvei 828) is a 33.6-kilometer (20.9 mi) road in Nordland County, Norway. It is also locally named Hæstadveien (Hæstad Road), Seløyveien (Seløy Road), Brunsvikveien (Brunsvik Road), Nord-Herøyveien (North Herøy Road), Sør-Herøyveien (South Herøy Road), Fagervikveien (Fagervik Road), and Flostadveien (Flostad Road).

The road runs from the ferry terminal at the village of Bjørn in Dønna Municipality along the south coast of the island of Dønna, passing through the village of Hestad. At the southern part of the island, it crosses the Åkviksundet Bridge and passes over several small islands, including Staulen, Skardsøya, Kjeøya, and Hestøya, before reaching the island of Nord-Herøy in Herøy Municipality. There one branch of the road runs northeast to the ferry terminal at Engan. The other branch runs southwest along the length of Nord-Herøy, crosses Herøysundet (Herøy Strait) via the Herøysund Bridge to the island of Sør-Herøy, turns south at Herøy School (Sentralskolen), and then turns east at Kjerkåsen before terminating at the ferry terminal at Flostad.
