= Helgeland Museum =

Group of museums in Norway

Coordinates: 65°50′14″N 13°11′14″E

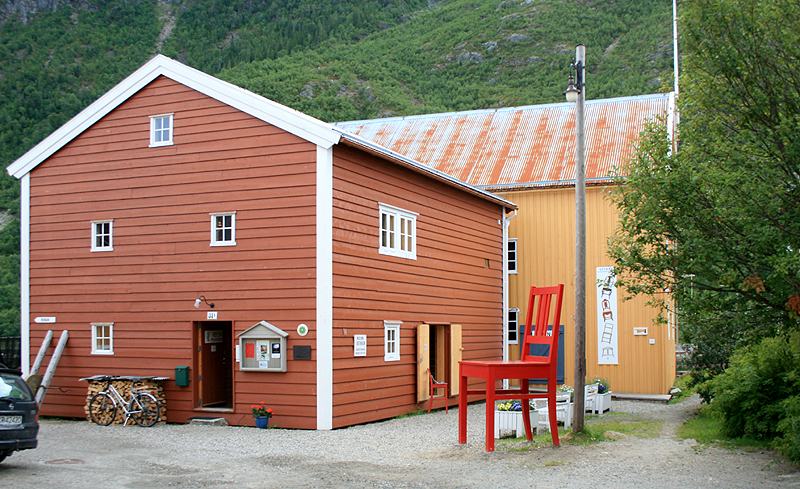
The Vefsn Museum on Sjøgata in Mosjøen, a division of the Helgeland Museum

The Helgeland Museum is a group of 18 museums and collections of buildings in 18 municipalities in Helgeland, Norway. The concept of the museum is to distribute the museum's expertise across Helgeland. This allows people with special professional skills to work for all of the museums in this collaboration. The Helgeland Museum has about 49 permanent employees. Its administrative office is on Sjøgata (Sea Street) in Mosjøen.

== Divisions ==
- Petter Dass Museum in Alstahaug Municipality
- Bindal Museum in Bindal Municipality
- Velfjord Open Air Museum in Brønnøy Municipality
- Old Nordvika trading post in Dønna Municipality
- Grane Open Air Museum in Grane Municipality
- Gammelsagmaro Open Air Museum in Grane Municipality
- Lensmann's farm in Hattfjelldal Municipality
- Hemnes Museum in Hemnes Municipality
- Herøy Open Air Museum in Herøy Municipality
- Leirfjord Museum in Leirfjord Municipality
- Grønsvik coastal battery in Lurøy Municipality
- Nesna Museum in Nesna Municipality
- Rana Museum in Rana Municipality
- Rødøy Museum / Old Falch trading post in Rødøy Municipality
- Sømna Open Air Museum in Sømna Municipality
- Træna Museum in Træna Municipality
- Vefsn Museum in Vefsn Municipality
- Vega Open Air Museum in Vega Municipality
- E-House eider duck museum in Vega Municipality
- Vevelstad Open Air Museum in Vevelstad Municipality
