= Herøy Open Air Museum =

Norwegian museum

Coordinates: 65°58′23″N 12°16′43″E

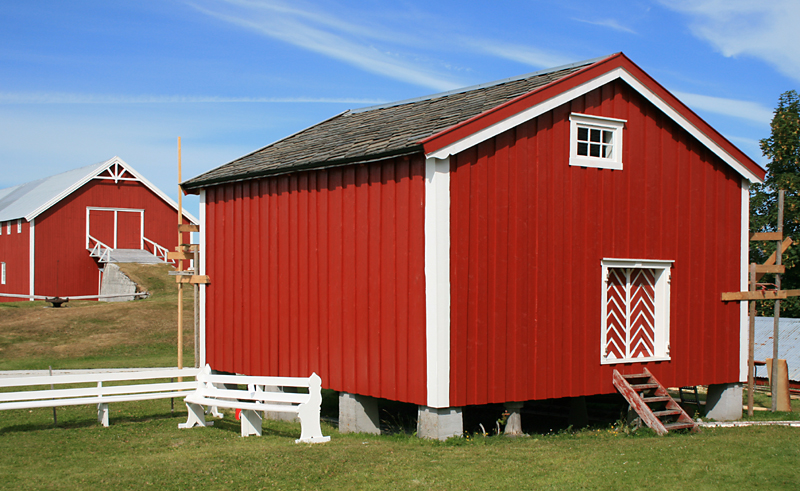
Elevated granary at the Herøy Parsonage

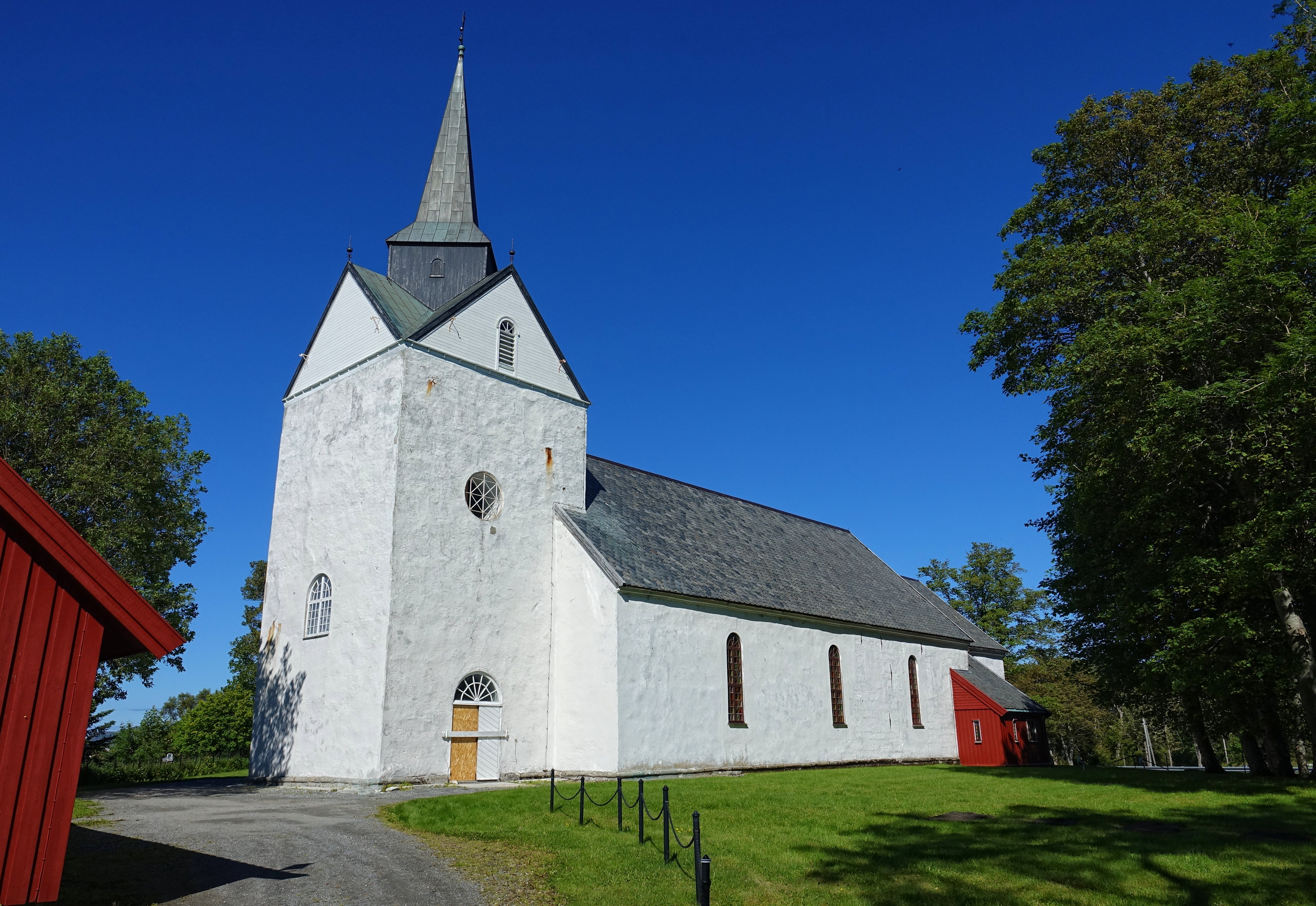
Herøy Church

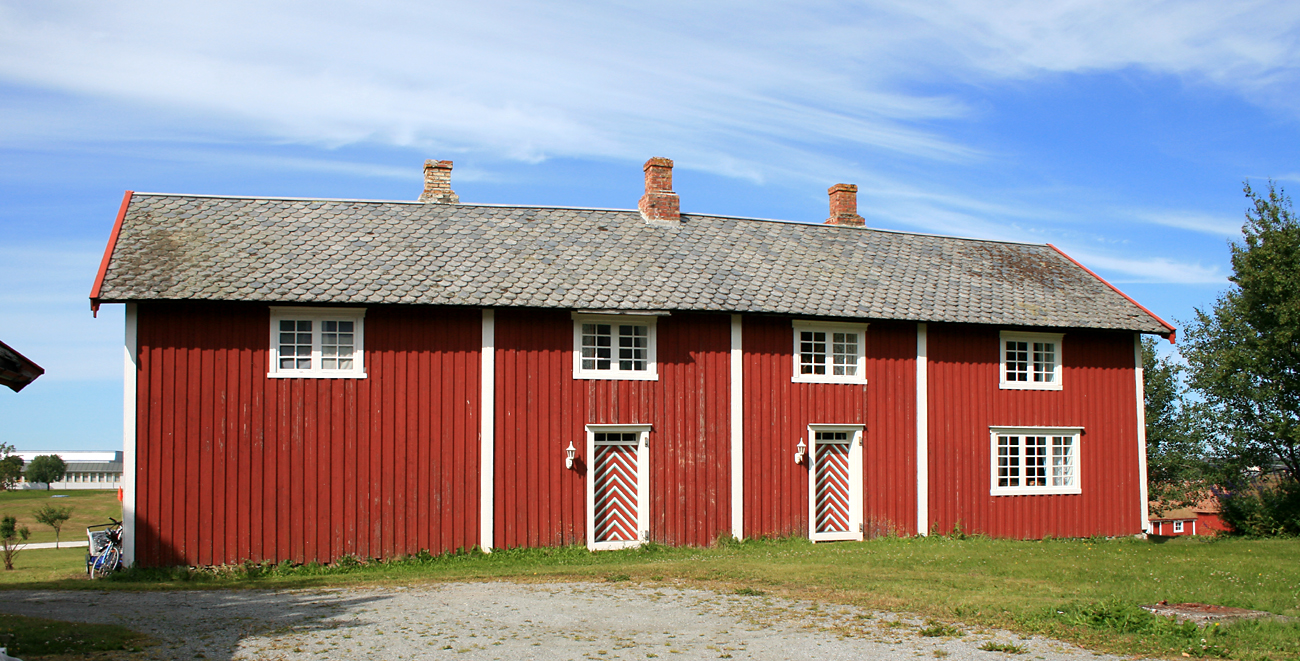
Servants' housing (borgstua) at the Herøy Parsonage

The Herøy Open Air Museum (Norwegian: Herøy bygdesamling) is a museum at the Herøy Parsonage on the island of Sør-Herøy in Nordland county, Norway. The museum is owned by the Herøy Historical Society (Herøy Historielag) and the Norwegian Church Endowment (Opplysningsvesenets fond, Ovf) but is operated by the Helgeland Museum.

The museum focuses on local cultural history and the history of civil service in the region, and it has a collection numbering over 15,000 items. A collection of historical photographs is part of the museum. In addition to its permanent exhibit, the museum also has rotating exhibits presenting art and cultural history. The museum is located close to Herøy Church, where guided tours are offered.
