= Sandværet =

Island in Nordland, Norway

- Interactive map of Sandværet

Geography
- Location: Nordland, Norway
- Coordinates: 65.8951°N 11.9872°E

Administration
- Norway
- County: Nordland
- Municipality: Herøy Municipality

Sandværet is an island group in Herøy Municipality in Nordland county, Norway. The islands are located about 17 kilometres (11 mi) southwest of the municipal center of Silvalen and about 5 kilometres (3.1 mi) west of the island of Husvær. The main populated islands in the group include Nordøya, Innerøya, Ytterøya, Langøya, and Gråøya. Sandvær Chapel serves the islands and has several worship services each year.

== See also ==
- List of islands of Norway
