= Gåsvær =

Island in Nordland, Norway

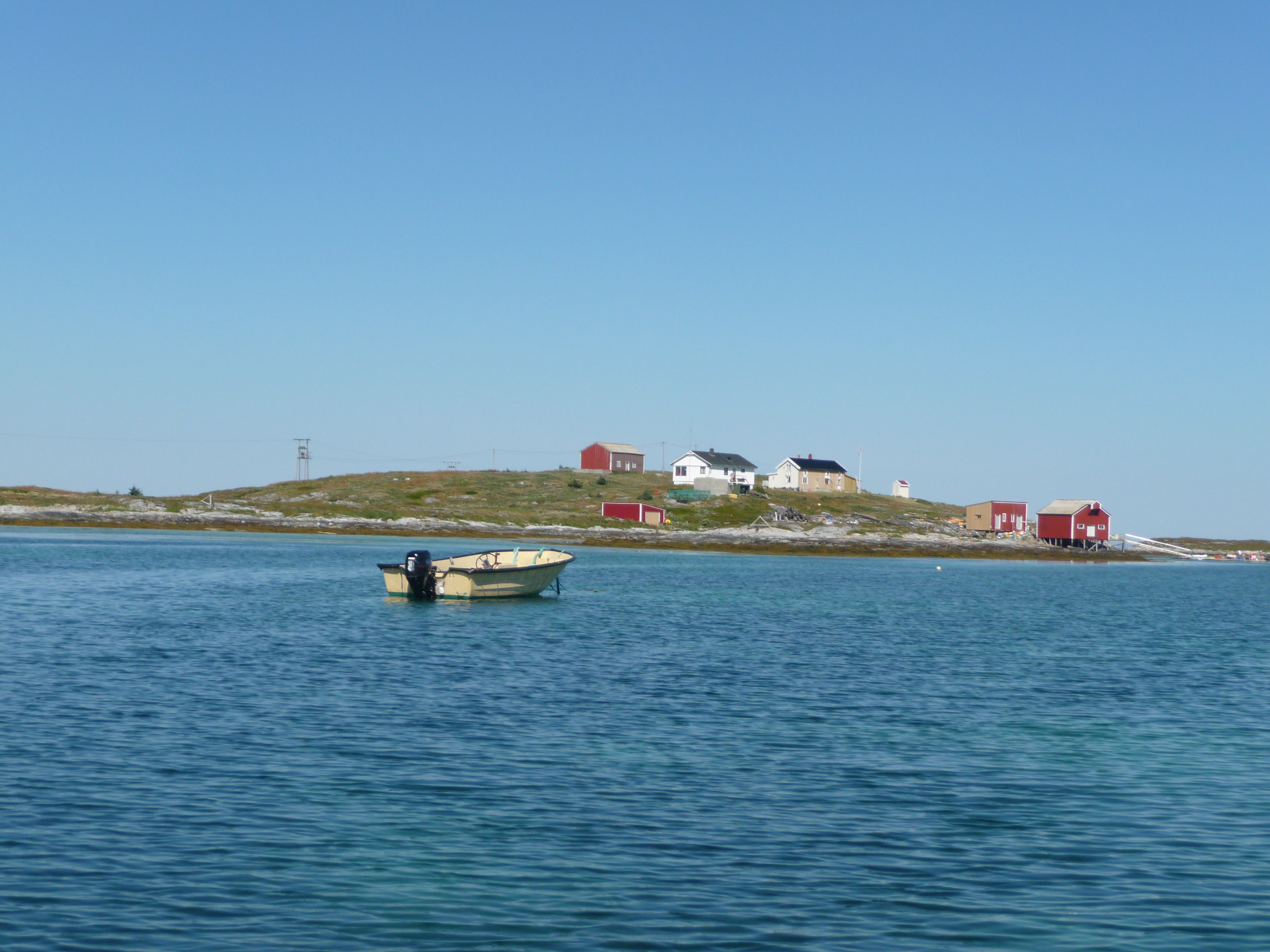
- View of Innerodden
- Interactive map of Gåsvær

Geography
- Location: Nordland, Norway
- Coordinates: 66.0526622°N 12.020855°E

Administration
- Norway
- County: Nordland
- Municipality: Herøy Municipality

Gåsvær is an island group in Herøy Municipality in Nordland county, Norway. It is located about 15 kilometres (9.3 mi) northwest of the municipal center of Silvalen. The main islands in the group include Nordgåsvær, Sørgåsvær, Flatøya, and Innerodden. Gåsvær Chapel is located on Sørgåsvær island. Ytterholmen Lighthouse lies about 15 kilometres (9.3 mi) southwest of Gåsvær.

The last permanent residents moved away from Gåsvær in 1990. Ferry services to Gåsvær ended in the summer of 2007. Many of the houses that remain on the islands are now used as holiday houses and summer houses. The islands once had many residents who made a living by fishing and small farms on the islands.

Electrical power was lost in 2024; the undersea power cable was damaged; there is no agreement about repairs to the 60-year old cable; there is no agreement about replacing the cable.

== See also ==
- List of islands of Norway
