= Hoholmen Bridge =

Hoholmen Bridge Hoholmen bru
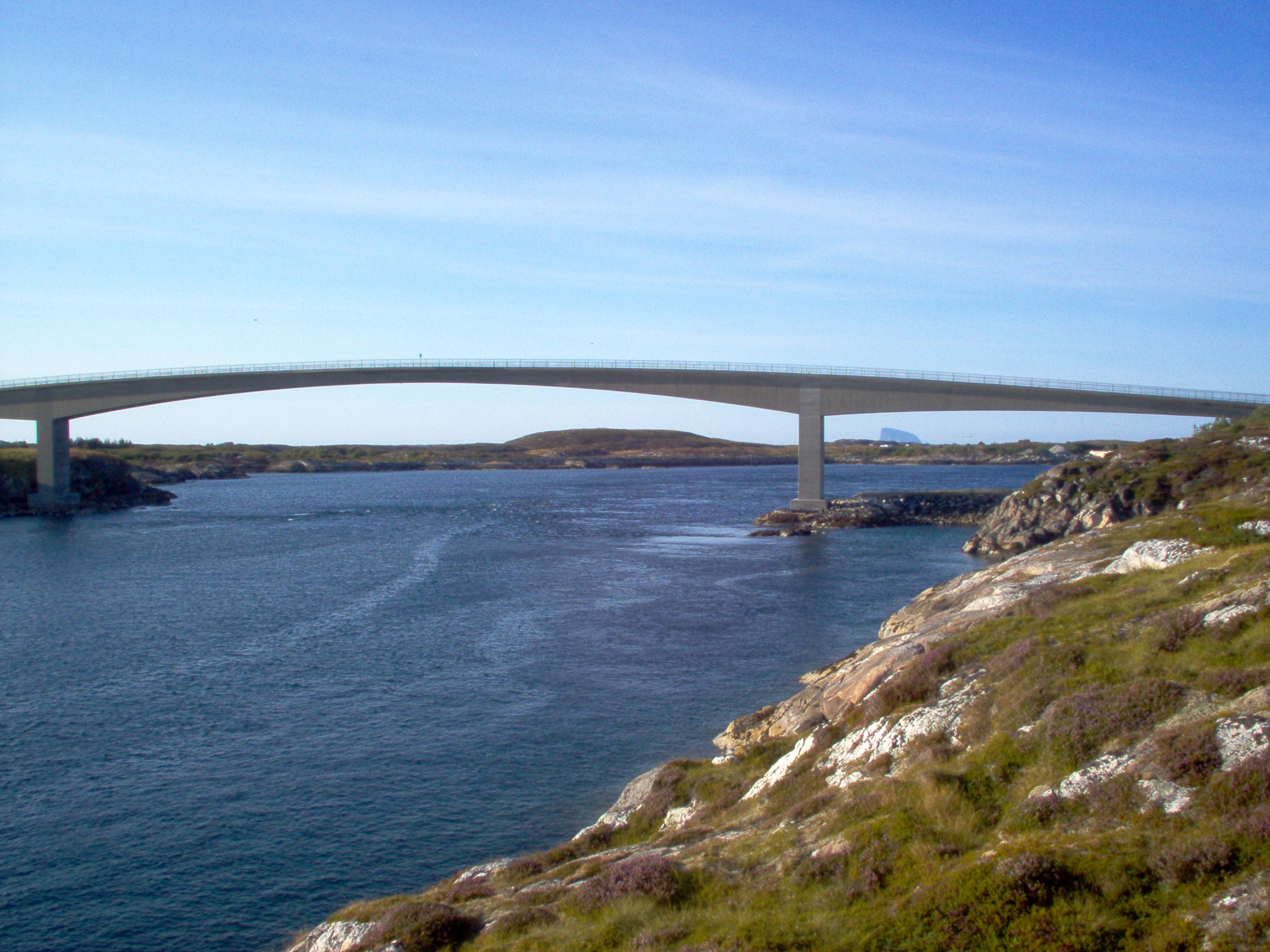
- View of the bridge
- Coordinates: 66°00′29″N 12°16′07″E
- Carries: Fv828
- Crosses: Hoholmstrømmen
- Locale: Herøy Municipality

Characteristics
- Design: Cantilever bridge
- Total length: 316 metres (1,037 ft)
- Longest span: 120 metres (390 ft)
- Clearance below: 24.2 metres (79 ft)

The Hoholmen Bridge (Norwegian: Hoholmen bru) is a cantilever bridge in Herøy Municipality in Nordland county, Norway. Together with the Åkviksundet Bridge, it forms the road connection between Herøy Municipality and Dønna Municipality, two neighboring island municipalities. It is located about 5 kilometres (3.1 mi) north of the village of Herøyholmen, between the small islands of Hoholmen and Kjeøya. The bridge is 316 metres (1,037 ft) long, and the main span is 120 metres (390 ft).

== See also ==
- List of bridges in Norway
- List of bridges in Norway by length
- List of bridges
- List of bridges by length
