= Kalvøyrevet Bridge =

Kalvøyrevet Bridge Kalvøyrevet bru
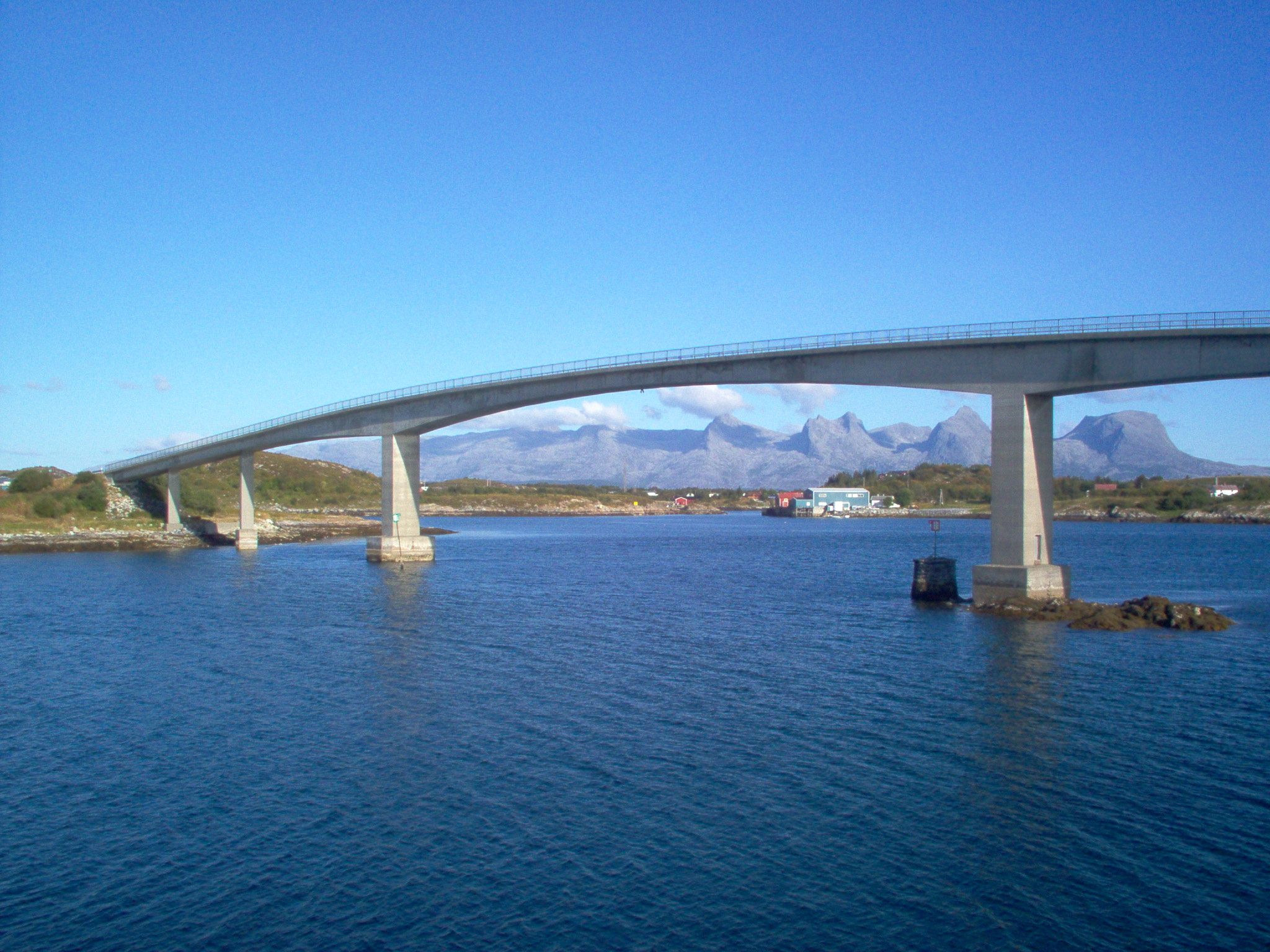
- View of the bridge (De syv søstre mountains in background)
- Coordinates: 65°59′51″N 12°15′55″E
- Carries: Fv166
- Locale: Herøy Municipality

Characteristics
- Design: Cantilever bridge
- Material: Concrete
- Total length: 298 metres (978 ft)
- Longest span: 95 metres (312 ft)

The Kalvøyrevet Bridge (Norwegian: Kalvøyrevet bru) is a cantilever bridge in Herøy Municipality in Nordland county, Norway. The concrete bridge is 298 metres (978 ft) long, and the main span is 95 metres (312 ft). The bridge connects the small islands of Kalvøya and Hestøya and it was built as a part of Norwegian County Road 166 which connects the larger islands of Indre Øksningan and Ytre Øksningan with the rest of Herøy Municipality.

== See also ==
- List of bridges in Norway
- List of bridges in Norway by length
- List of bridges
- List of bridges by length
