= Sør-Herøy =

Island in Nordland, Norway

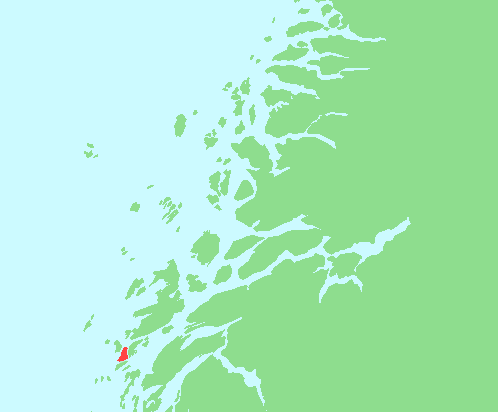
- The island of Sør-Herøy highlighted in red.
- Interactive map of Sør-Herøy

Geography
- Location: Nordland, Norway
- Coordinates: 65.9705°N 12.2560°E
- Archipelago: Herøy
- Area: 6.2 km^{2} (2.4 sq mi)
- Length: 4.7 km (2.92 mi)
- Width: 2.3 km (1.43 mi)
- Highest elevation: 48 m (157 ft)
- Highest point: Lauvås

Administration
- Norway
- County: Nordland
- Municipality: Herøy Municipality

Demographics
- Population: 446 (2017)

Sør-Herøy (lit. 'South Herøy') is an island in the middle of Herøy Municipality in Nordland county, Norway. Sør-Herøy is surrounded by the following islands: Nord-Herøy (to the northeast), Tenna (to the south), and Indre Øksningan (to the northwest). To the west lies the Færøysundet strait, named after the islet of Færøya, which is actually a peninsula connected to Sør-Herøy. To the east lies the Herøysundet strait, which is crossed by the Herøysund Bridge and Norwegian County Road 828 to Nord-Herøy. To the south lies the Tennsundet strait with the Tennsund Bridge and Norwegian County Road 161 to Tenna. The bridges create part of the road network connecting the municipality of Herøy to the island of Dønna, which lies to the north in Dønna Municipality. The island has a population of 446 (in 2017).

Sør-Herøy is the location of Herøy Church, an old stone church dating from the 1100s, where the poet and priest Petter Dass served as a curate. The parsonage is also located on the island.

Herøy School serves students from Sør-Herøy, Tenna, and Nord-Herøy islands. This area was combined into a single school district in 2008.

There is a ferry stop located on the southeastern shore of the island with regular ferries to the nearby islands of Alsten, Altra, and Husvær.

== See also ==
- List of islands of Norway
