= Ytterholmen Lighthouse =

Coastal lighthouse in Norway

Ytterholmen Lighthouse Ytterholmen fyrstasjon
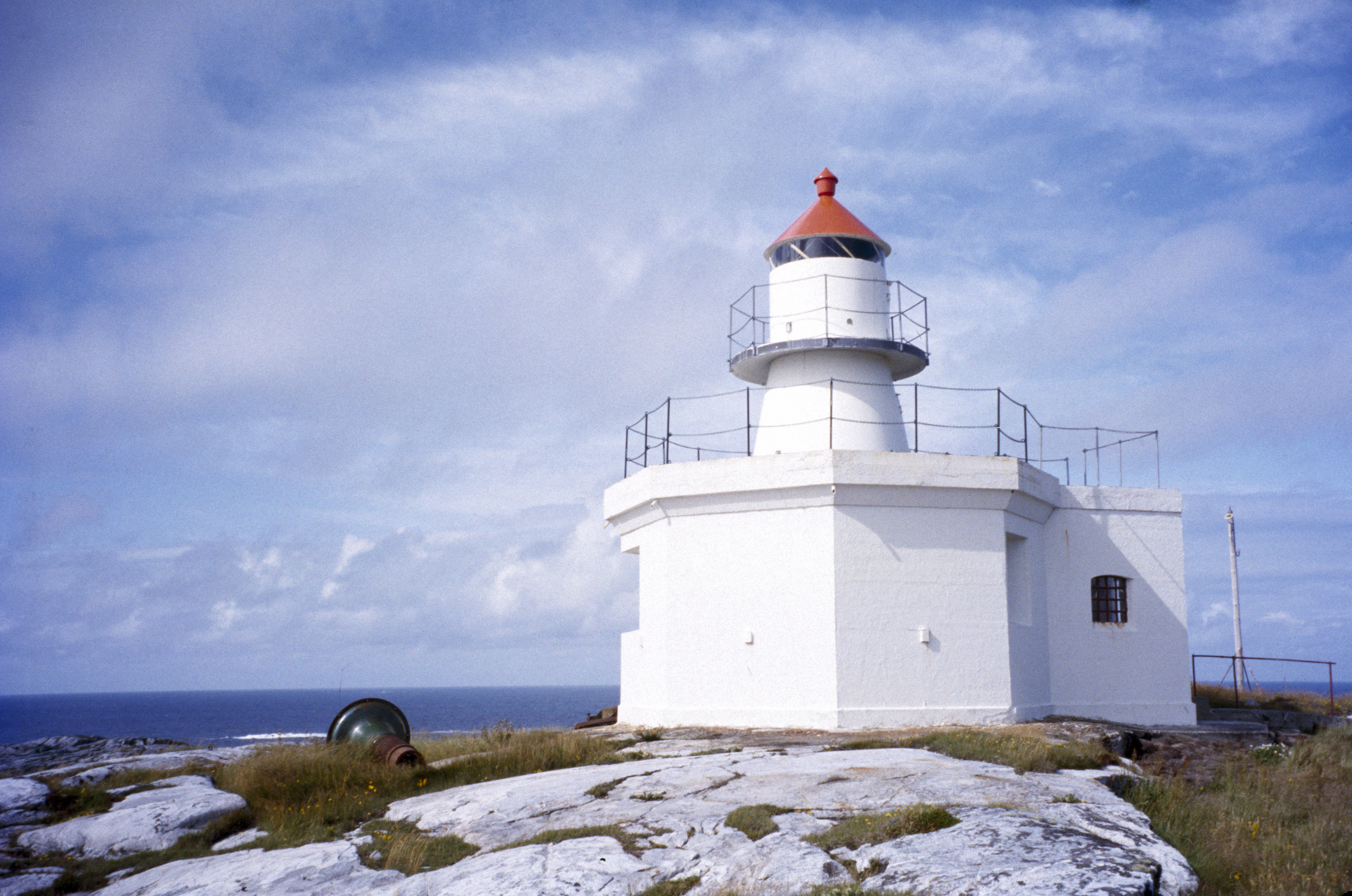
- View of the lighthouse
- Location of the lighthouse
- Location: Nordland, Norway
- Coordinates: 66°01′N 11°41′E

Tower
- Constructed: 1912
- Foundation: octagonal prism
- Construction: stone
- Automated: 2003
- Height: 9 metres (30 ft)
- Shape: cylindrical tower
- Markings: white tower, red lantern roof

Light
- Focal height: 47.4 metres (156 ft)
- Range: 22.1 nmi (40.9 km; 25.4 mi)
- Characteristic: Fl(2) W 30s, Oc(2) WRG 10s
- Norway no.: 654500

Ytterholmen Lighthouse (Norwegian: Ytterholmen fyr) is a coastal lighthouse in Herøy Municipality in Nordland county, Norway. It is located on the island of Ytterholmen, about 40 kilometres (25 mi) west of the town of Sandnessjøen and about 15 kilometres (9.3 mi) southwest of the Gåsvær islands. The lighthouse is owned and operated by the municipality and it can be rented by tourists.

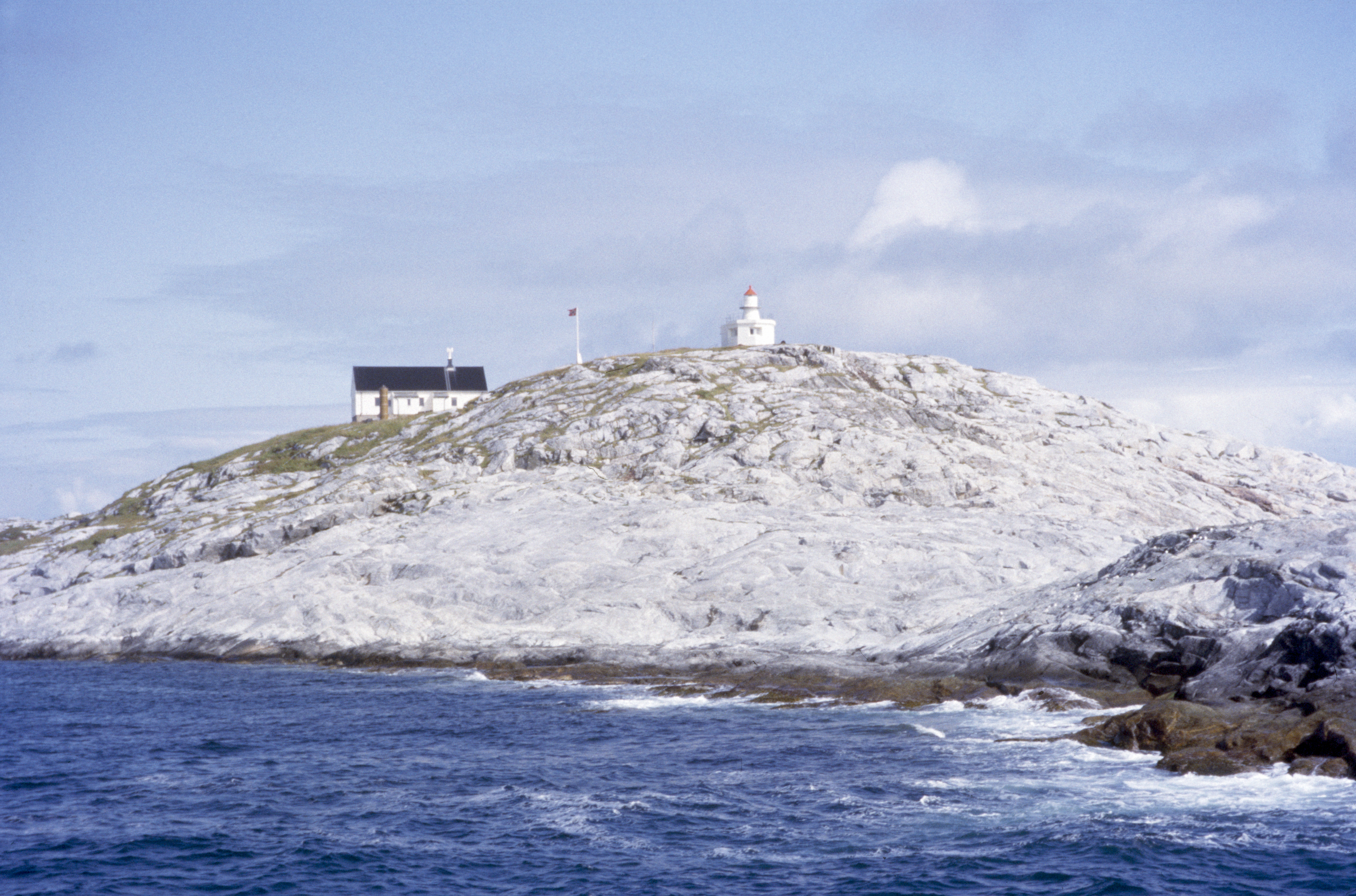
Ytterholmen Lighthouse

Ytterholmen Lighthouse is a white, 9-metre (30 ft) tall lighthouse tower which was built in 1910 and it was automated in 2003. The light sits at an elevation of 47.4 metres (156 ft) above sea level. It can be seen for up to 22.1 nautical miles (40.9 km; 25.4 mi). The light emits two white flashes every 30 seconds.

There is also a secondary light about 4 metres (13 ft) below the main light. This secondary light emits a white, red or green depending on direction, occulting twice every 10 seconds. The secondary light can be seen for up to 12 nautical miles (22 km; 14 mi).

== See also ==
- Lighthouses in Norway
- List of lighthouses in Norway
