= Sandvær Chapel =

Church in Nordland, Norway

- Sandvær bedehuskapell
- Sandvær Chapel
- 65.89563063°N 11.99427196°E
- Location: Herøy Municipality, Nordland
- Country: Norway
- Denomination: Church of Norway
- Churchmanship: Evangelical Lutheran

History
- Status: Chapel
- Founded: 1947
- Consecrated: 1947

Architecture
- Functional status: Active
- Architectural type: Long church
- Completed: 1947 (79 years ago)

Specifications
- Capacity: 70
- Materials: Wood

Administration
- Diocese: Sør-Hålogaland
- Deanery: Nord-Helgeland prosti
- Parish: Herøy

Sandvær Chapel (Norwegian: Sandvær bedehuskapell) is a chapel of the Church of Norway in Herøy Municipality in Nordland county, Norway. It is located in the Sandværet islands. It is an annex chapel in the Herøy parish which is part of the Nord-Helgeland prosti (deanery) in the Diocese of Sør-Hålogaland. The wooden chapel was built in a long church style in 1947. The chapel seats about 70 people.

== See also ==
- List of churches in Sør-Hålogaland
