= Husvær Chapel =

Church in Nordland, Norway

- Husvær bedehuskapell
- Husvær Chapel
- 65.91270661°N 12.12126061°E
- Location: Herøy Municipality, Nordland
- Country: Norway
- Denomination: Church of Norway
- Churchmanship: Evangelical Lutheran

History
- Status: Chapel
- Founded: 1936
- Consecrated: 1936

Architecture
- Functional status: Active
- Architect(s): Otto Edvardsen and Peder Andersen
- Architectural type: Long church
- Completed: 1936 (90 years ago)

Specifications
- Capacity: 80
- Materials: Wood

Administration
- Diocese: Sør-Hålogaland
- Deanery: Nord-Helgeland prosti
- Parish: Herøy

Husvær Chapel (Norwegian: Husvær bedehuskapell) is a chapel of the Church of Norway in Herøy Municipality in Nordland county, Norway. It is located in the Husvær island group. It is an annex chapel in the Herøy parish which is part of the Nord-Helgeland prosti (deanery) in the Diocese of Sør-Hålogaland. The wooden chapel was built in a long church style in 1936 using plans drawn up by the architects Otto Edvardsen and Peder Andersen. The chapel seats about 80 people.

== See also ==
- List of churches in Sør-Hålogaland
