= Husvær =

Island in Nordland, Norway

- Interactive map of Husvær

Geography
- Location: Nordland, Norway
- Coordinates: 65.9154°N 12.1159°E

Administration
- Norway
- County: Nordland
- Municipality: Herøy Municipality

Husvær is an island group in Herøy Municipality in Nordland county, Norway. The islands are located about 10 kilometres (6.2 mi) southwest of the municipal center of Silvalen and just southwest of the island of Tenna. The Sandværet islands lie about 5 kilometres (3.1 mi) west of Husvær. The islands have one main road connecting several of the populated islands together with a ferry link at the eastern end. The main populated islands are Husvær, Prestøya, and Brasøya. Husvær Chapel offers several worship services each year.

The area around Husvær is quite nice for tourism, especially for boating and camping.

== See also ==
- List of islands of Norway
