= Gåsvær Chapel =

Church in Nordland, Norway

- Gåsvær kapell
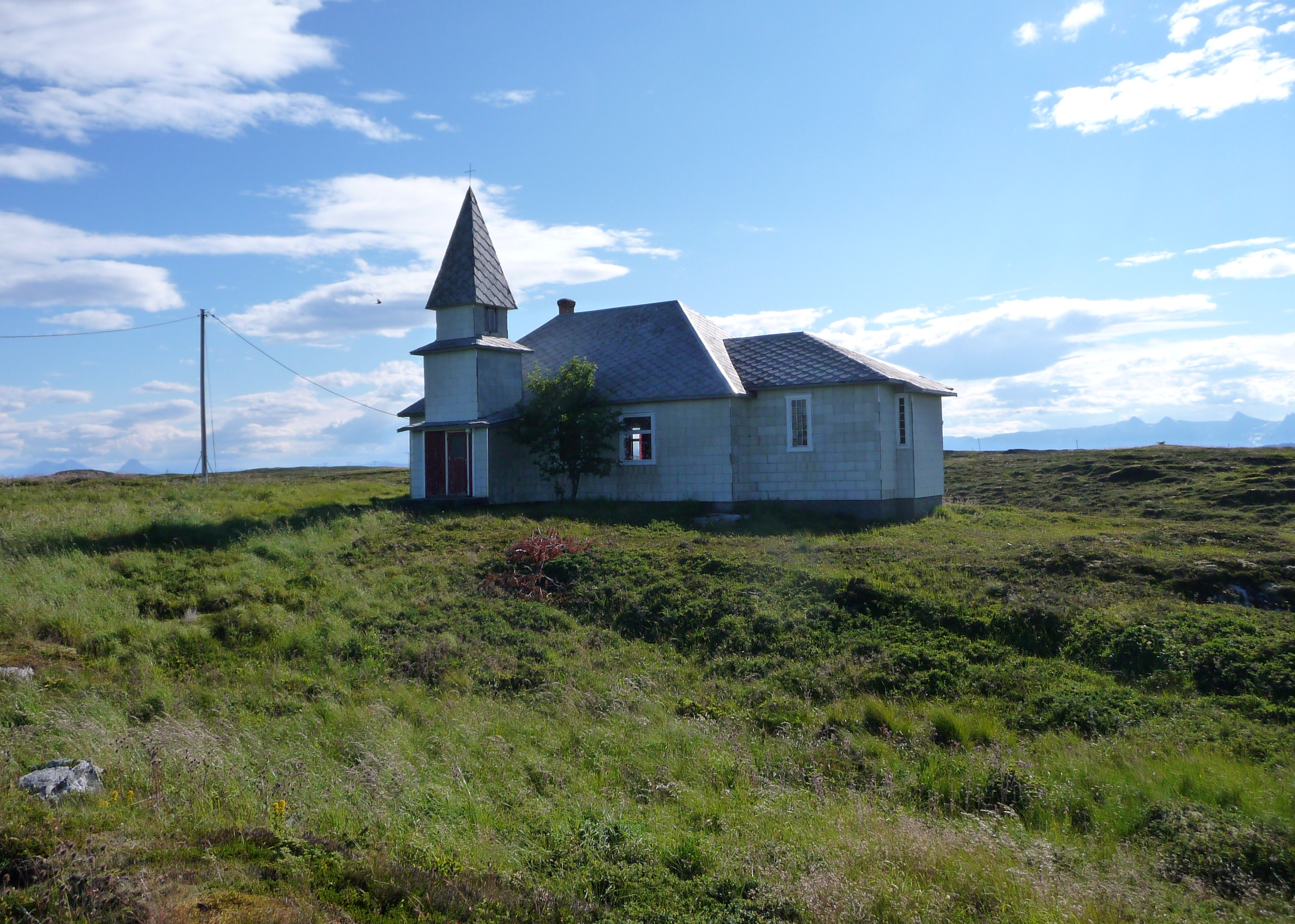
- View of the chapel
- Gåsvær Chapel
- 66.04828325°N 12.00991273°E
- Location: Herøy Municipality, Nordland
- Country: Norway
- Denomination: Church of Norway
- Churchmanship: Evangelical Lutheran

History
- Status: Chapel
- Founded: 1951
- Consecrated: June 1951

Architecture
- Functional status: Inactive
- Architect: Peder Stavnes
- Architectural type: Long church
- Completed: 1951 (75 years ago)

Specifications
- Capacity: 100
- Materials: Wood

Administration
- Diocese: Sør-Hålogaland
- Deanery: Nord-Helgeland prosti
- Parish: Herøy
- Norwegian Cultural Heritage Site
- Type: Church
- Status: Not protected
- ID: 84456

Gåsvær Chapel (Norwegian: Gåsvær kapell) is a chapel of the Church of Norway in Herøy Municipality in Nordland county, Norway. It is located in the Gåsvær islands. It is an annex chapel in the Herøy parish which is part of the Nord-Helgeland prosti (deanery) in the Diocese of Sør-Hålogaland. The white, wooden chapel was built in a long church style in 1951 using plans drawn up by the architect Peder Stavnes. The chapel seats about 100 people.

== History ==
The islands of Gåsvær were once quite populated with many homes, shops, and schools. Many fishermen and their families lived there. In the 1940s and early 1950s a local chapter of the Norwegian YMCA was established in Gåsvær. This group decided to build a prayer chapel for the islands. The new chapel was consecrated in June 1951. In 1967, the small chapel was enlarged and upgraded to the status of a "chapel" rather than a simple prayer house. Over time, the islands have depopulated since the islands are not accessible by road. The church is rarely used anymore since no one permanently lives on the island. Currently there is one worship service held at this church each July when vacationers are visiting the holiday cottages on the island.

== See also ==
- List of churches in Sør-Hålogaland
