= Tenna, Nordland =

Island in Nordland, Norway

Tenna Kinnarøya
- Interactive map of Tenna; Kinnarøya

Geography
- Location: Nordland, Norway
- Coordinates: 65.9434°N 12.2169°E
- Archipelago: Herøy
- Area: 3.5 km^{2} (1.4 sq mi)
- Length: 4.5 km (2.8 mi)
- Width: 1.3 km (0.81 mi)
- Highest elevation: 21 m (69 ft)
- Highest point: Nord-Stauløyhågjen

Administration
- Norway
- County: Nordland
- Municipality: Herøy Municipality

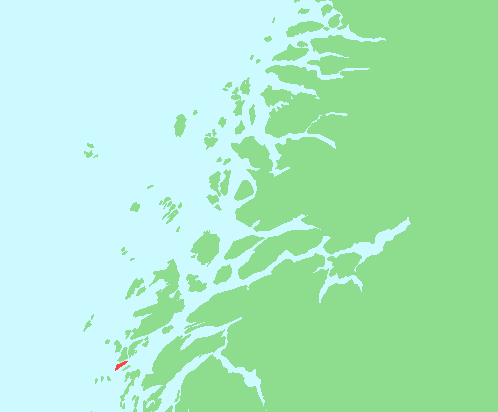
Locator map of Tenna, Nordland, Norway

Tenna or Kinnarøya is an island in Herøy Municipality in Nordland county, Norway. The island has an area of 3.5 square kilometers (1.4 sq mi). It is traversed by Norwegian County Road 161, which also connects it to the neighboring island of Sør-Herøy, crossing the Tennsundet (lit. 'Tenna Strait') over the Tennsund Bridge. To the south lies the Andøysundet (lit. 'Andøya Strait'). The Husvær islands lie to the southwest of Tenna; they are connected to Tenna by a ferry.

== See also ==
- List of islands of Norway
