= Herøy Church (Nordland) =

Church in Nordland, Norway

- Herøy kirke
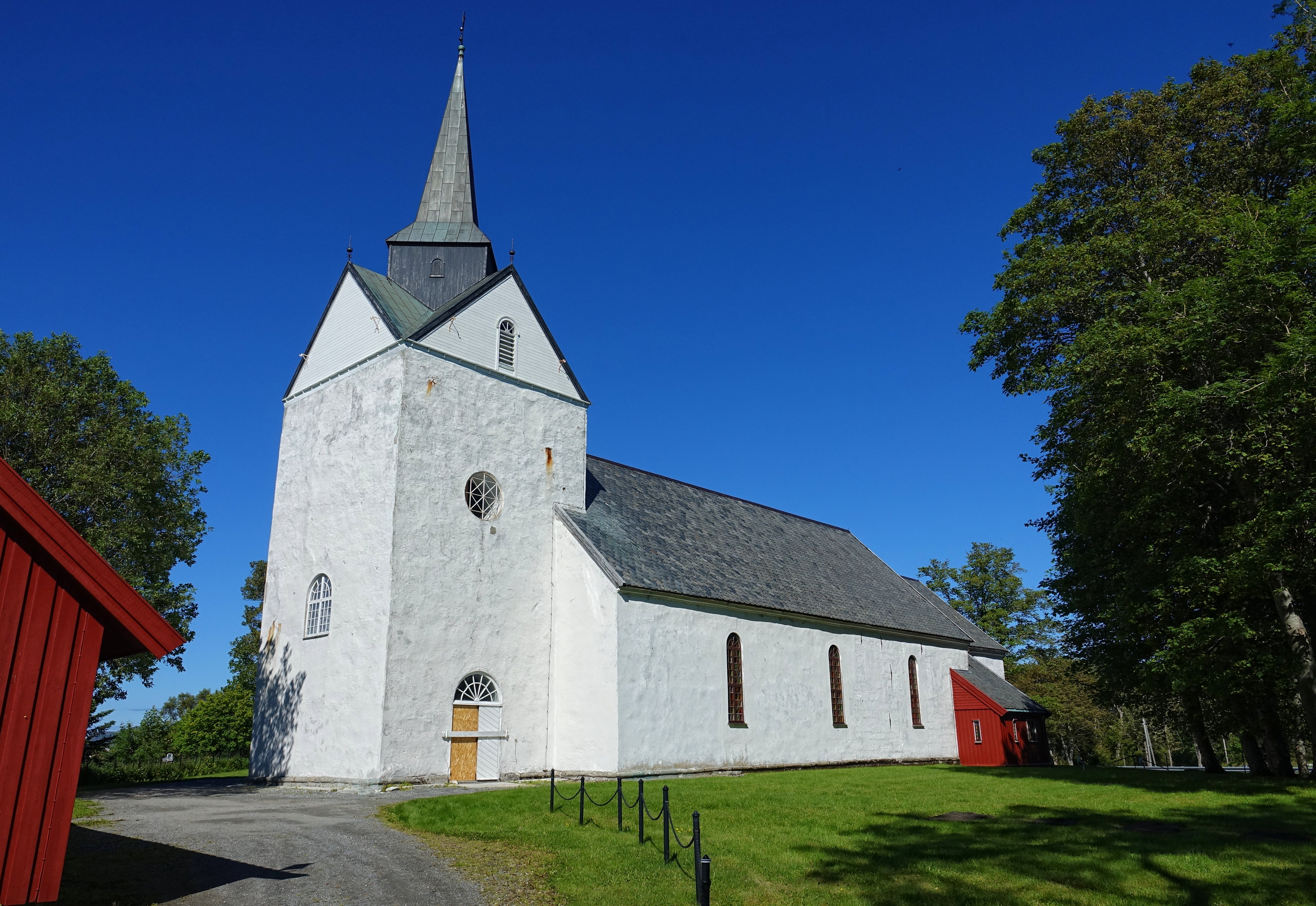
- View of the church
- Herøy Church
- 65.97310085°N 12.2782967°E
- Location: Herøy Municipality, Nordland
- Country: Norway
- Denomination: Church of Norway
- Previous denomination: Catholic Church
- Churchmanship: Evangelical Lutheran

History
- Status: Parish church
- Founded: 12th century
- Consecrated: 12th century

Architecture
- Functional status: Active
- Architectural type: Long church
- Completed: c. 1150 (876 years ago)

Specifications
- Capacity: 350
- Materials: Stone

Administration
- Diocese: Sør-Hålogaland
- Deanery: Nord-Helgeland prosti
- Parish: Herøy
- Norwegian Cultural Heritage Site
- Type: Church
- Status: Automatically protected
- ID: 84564

Herøy Church (Norwegian: Herøy kirke) is a parish church of the Church of Norway in Herøy Municipality in Nordland county, Norway. It is located in the village of Silvalen on the island of Sør-Herøy. It is the main church for the Herøy parish which is part of the Nord-Helgeland prosti (deanery) in the Diocese of Sør-Hålogaland. The white, wooden church was built in a long church style in the 12th century using plans drawn up by an unknown architect. The church seats about 350 people.

== History ==
The earliest existing historical records of the church date back to the year 1432, but the church was originally constructed during the second half of the 1100s. The church has a rectangular nave, a tower to the west, and a narrower choir with a semicircular apse. The choir and apse have a lower roof line than the nave. Research on the building has shown that the choir part is the oldest part of the existing building with the apse and nave built a little later. Originally, the current choir was the stone nave that was attached to a wooden building. The wood building was later torn down and the stone building was expanded. Over the years, the church fell into disrepair. During the early 1400s, the western wall of the church was taken down and the stone nave was shortened by about 4 metres (13 ft) and then a new wall was built. In 1879, the church was enlarged by doubling the length the nave (adding about 10 metres (33 ft) to the nave) and then a new west tower was added on the end of the new nave. In the 1960s, the church was thoroughly renovated by the architect John Egil Tverdahl.

== Media gallery ==
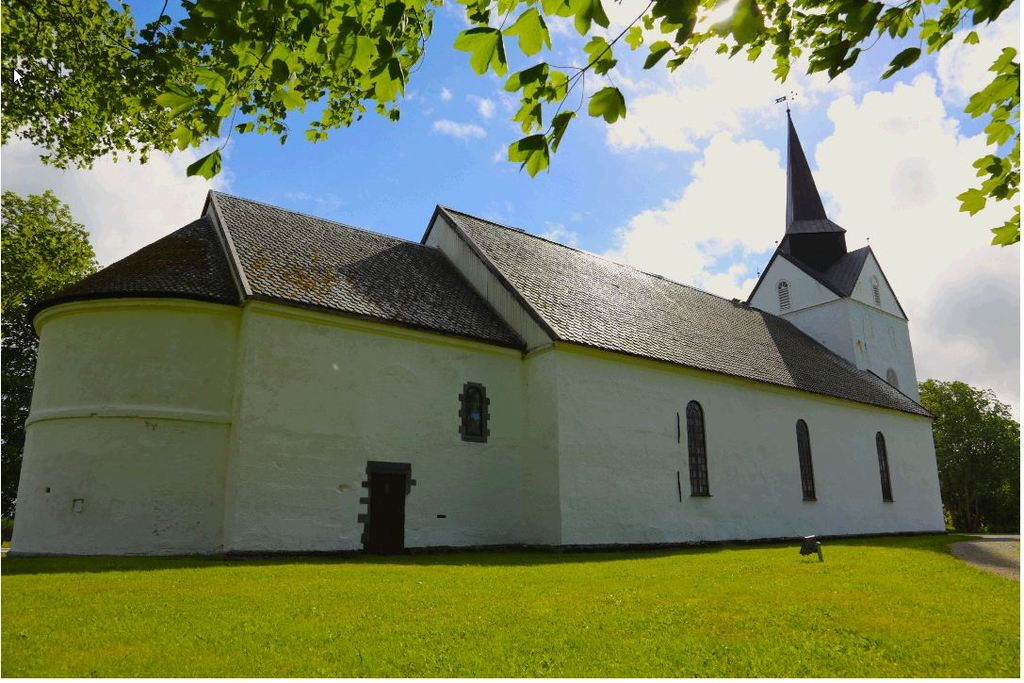

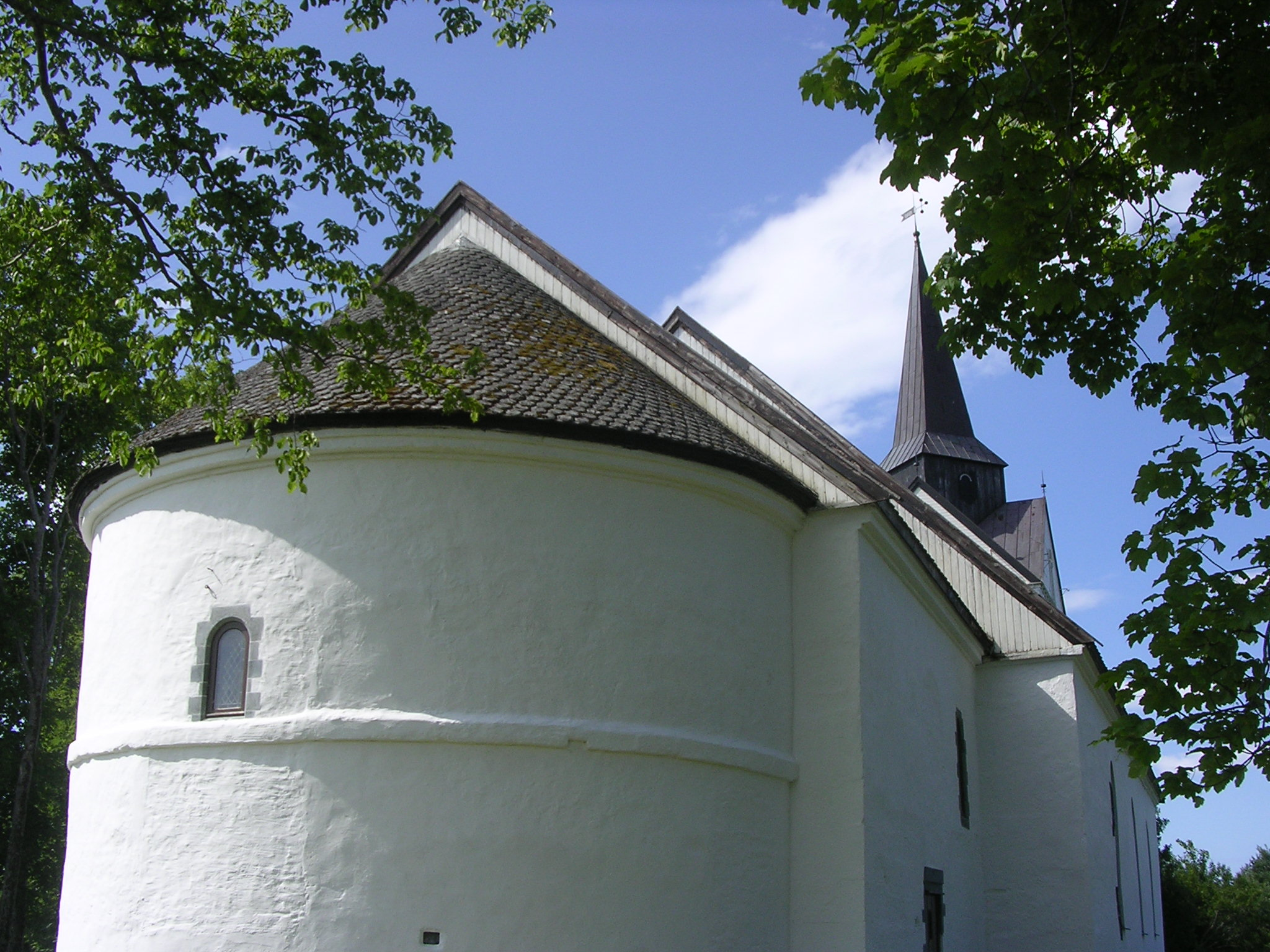

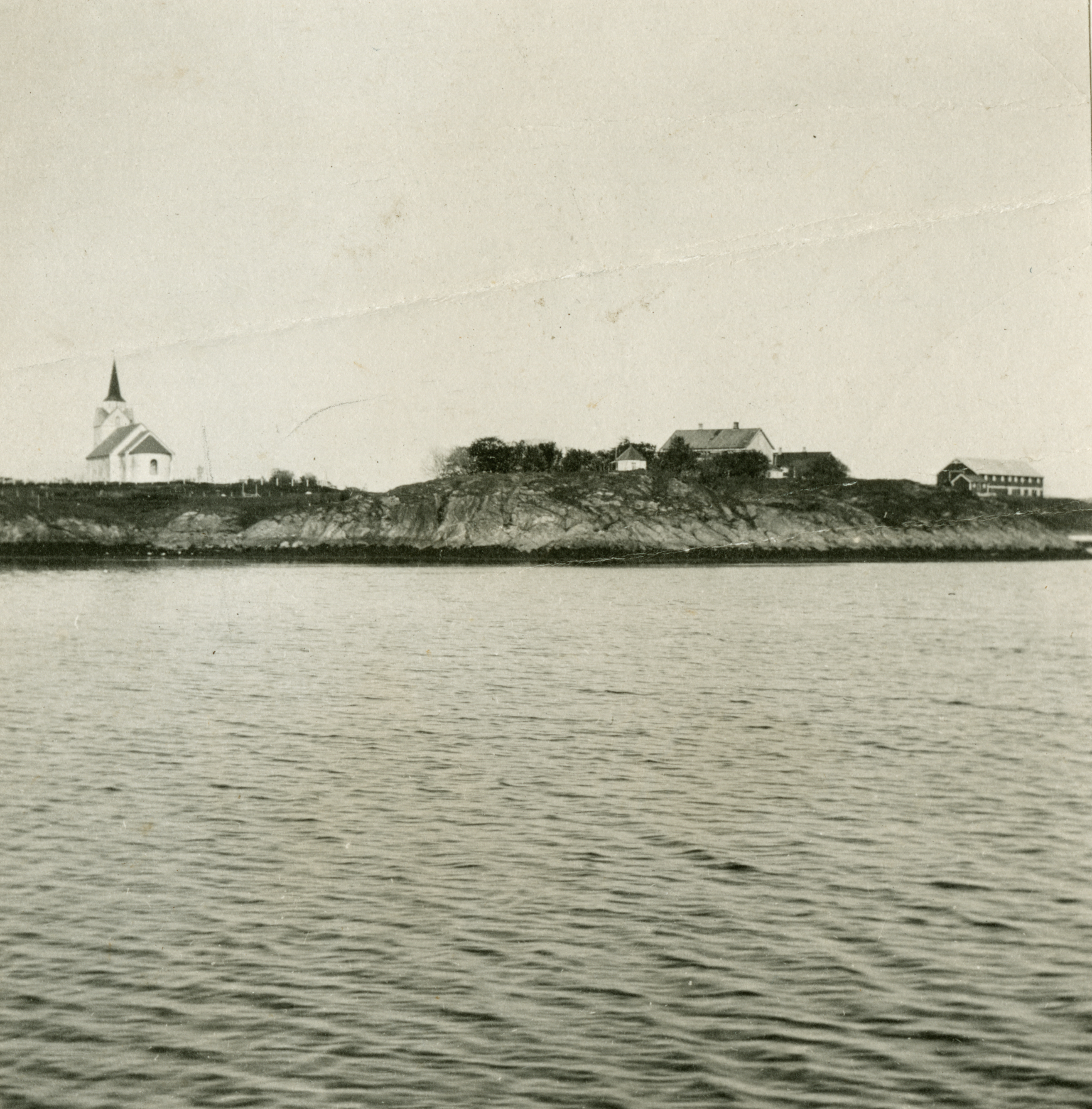

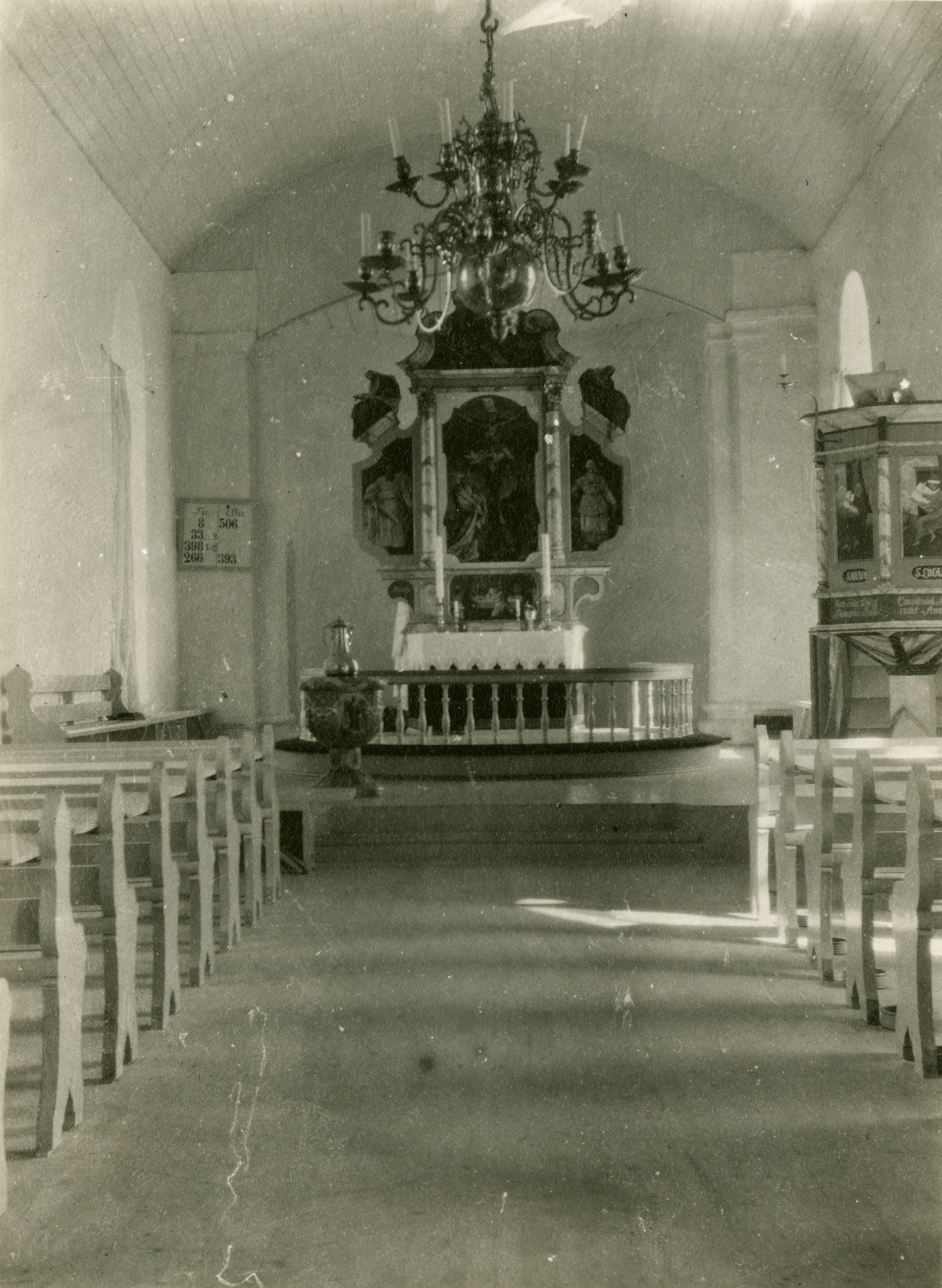

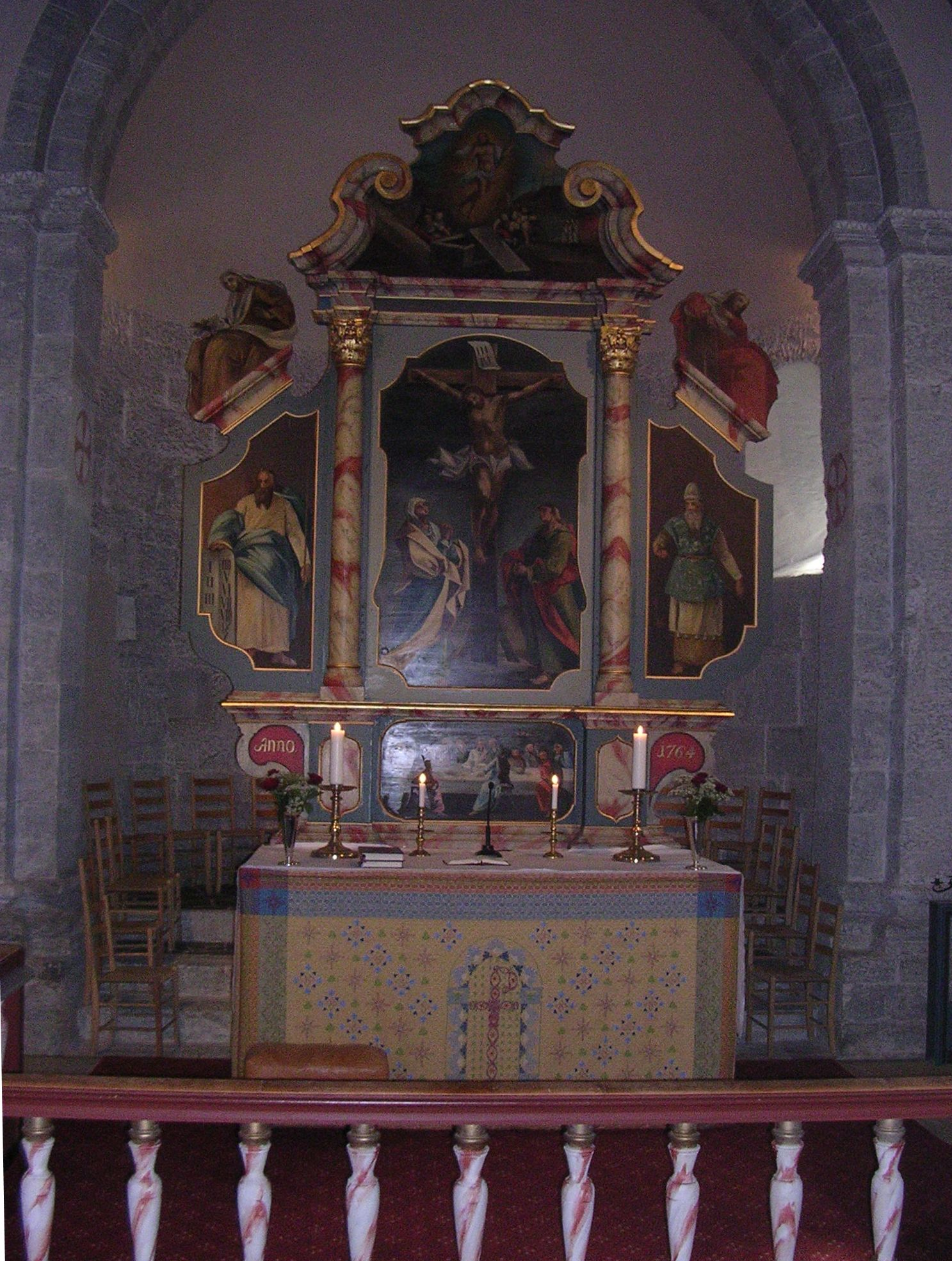

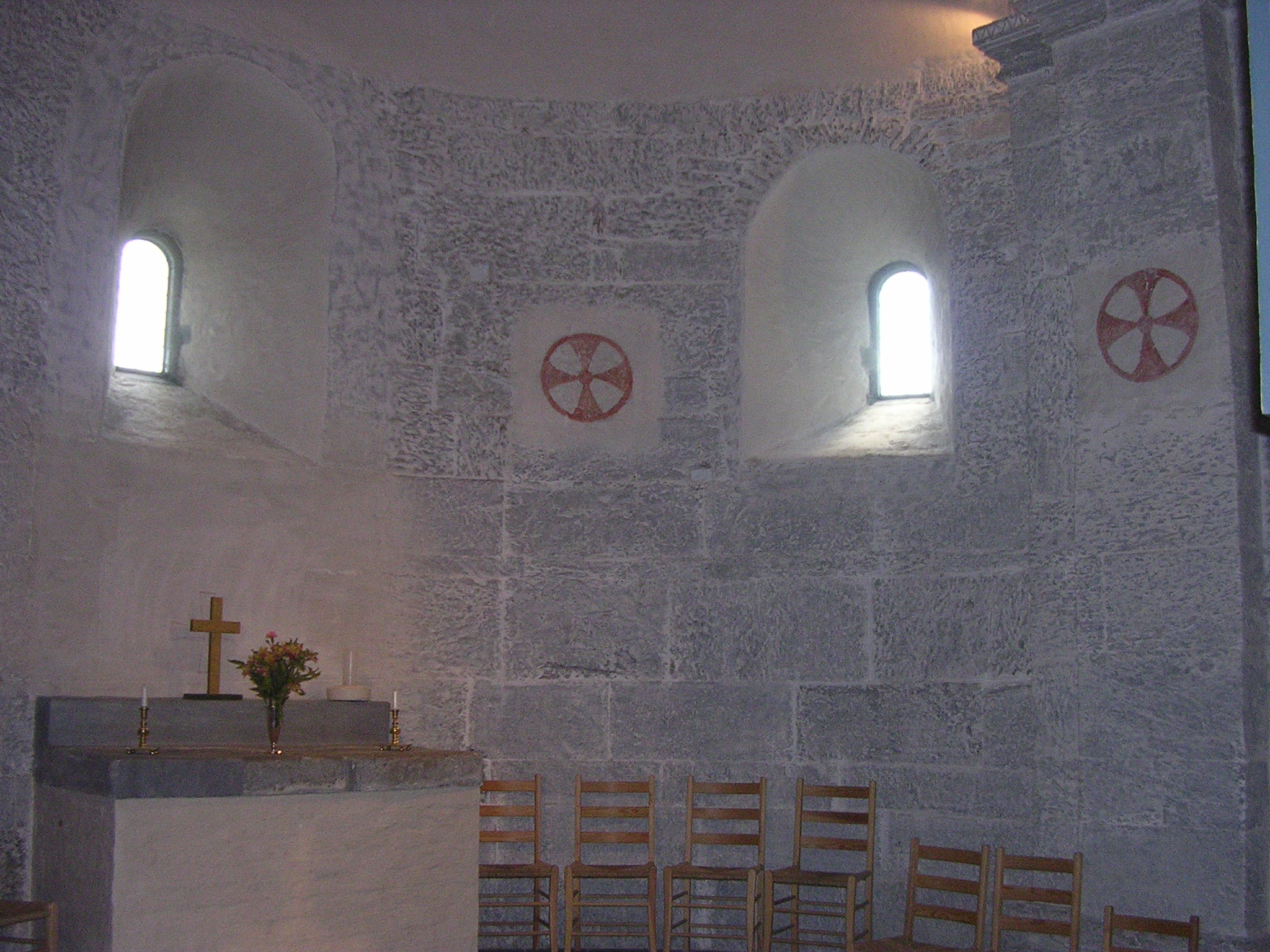

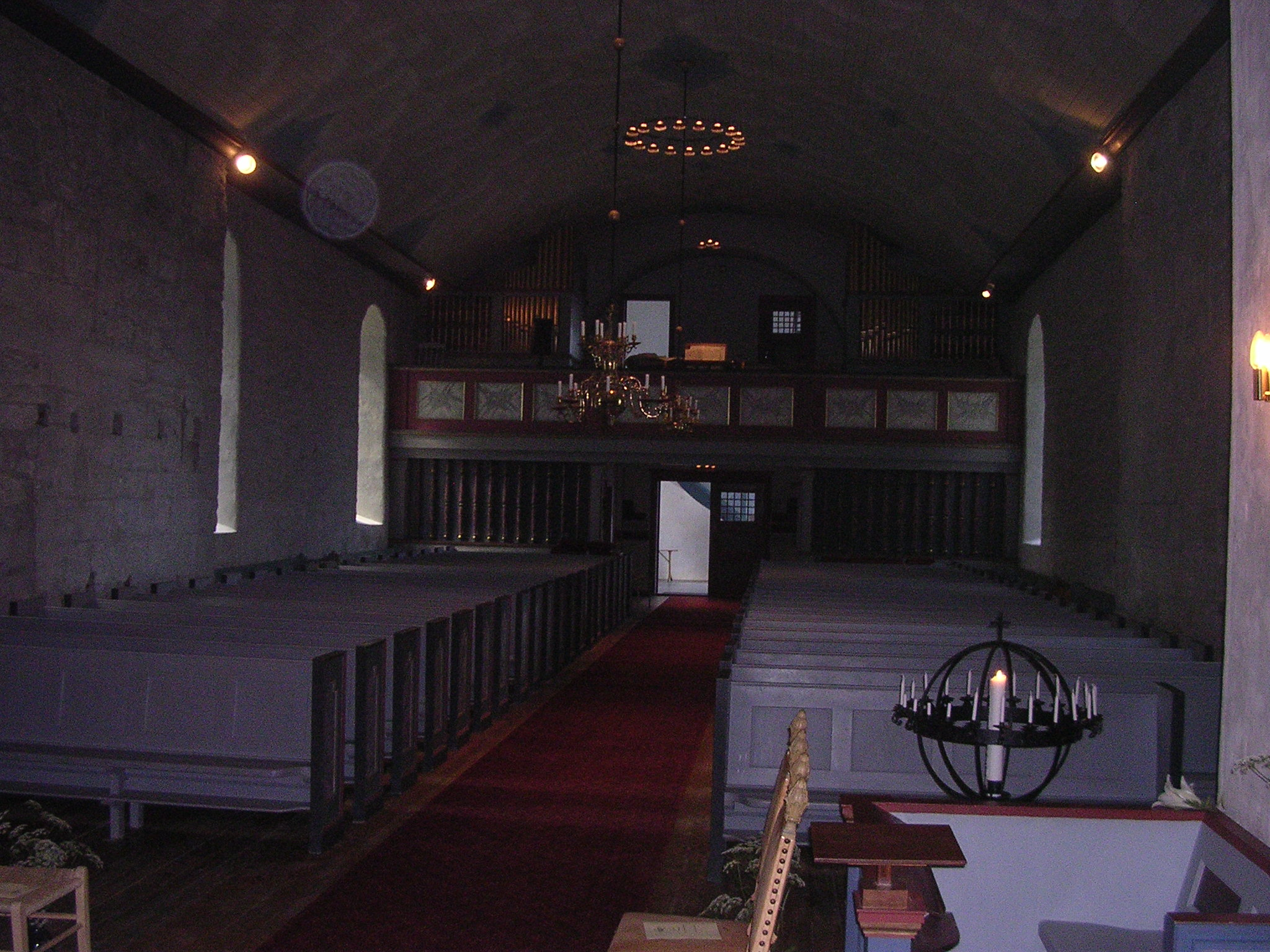

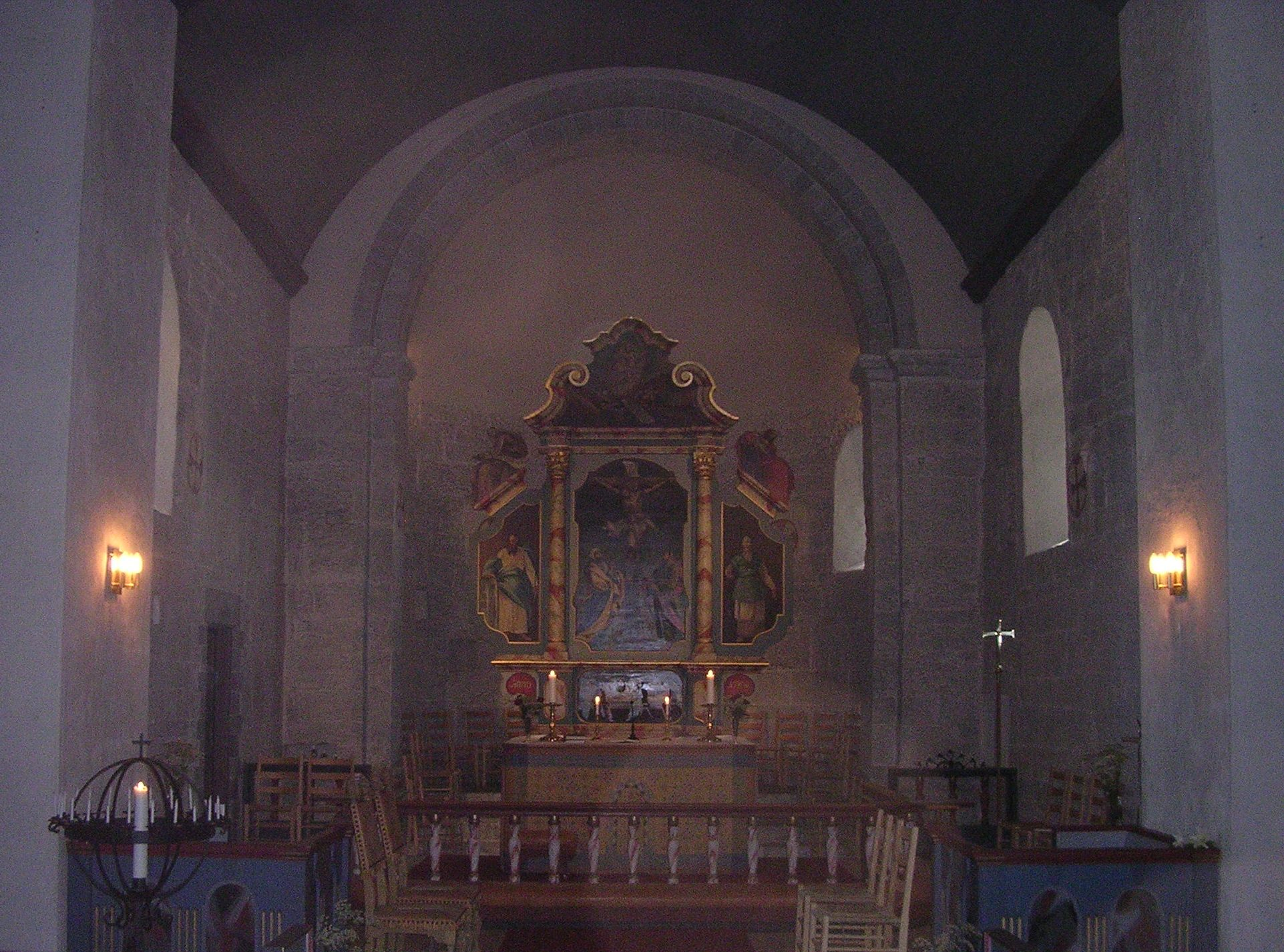

== See also ==
- List of churches in Sør-Hålogaland
