= Åkviksundet Bridge =

Åkviksundet Bridge Åkviksundet bru
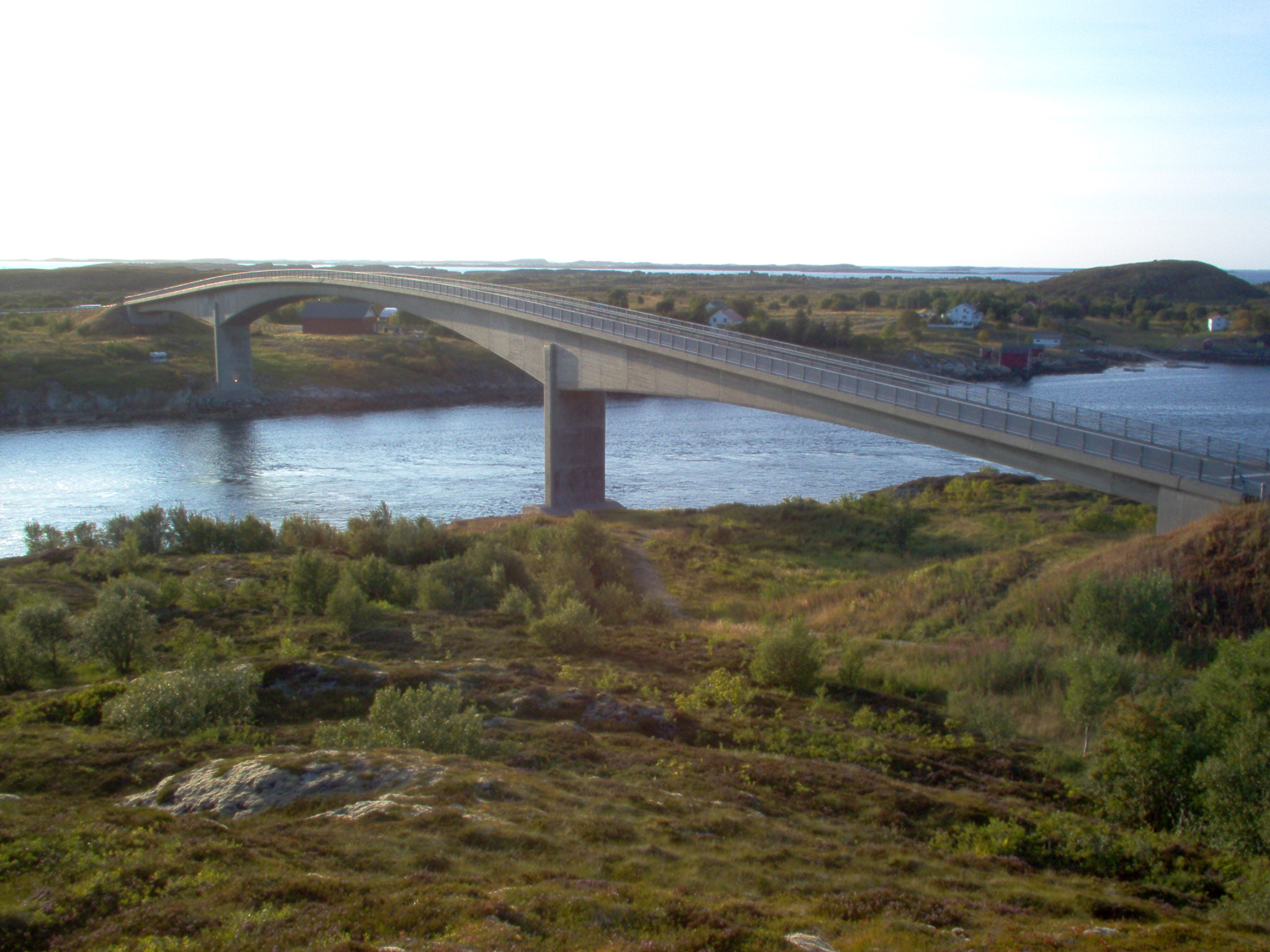
- View of the bridge
- Coordinates: 66°01′38″N 12°17′50″E

Characteristics
- Design: Box girder bridge
- Material: Concrete
- Total length: 285 metres (935 ft)
- Width: 9.1 metres (30 ft)
- Longest span: 135 metres (443 ft)
- No. of spans: 3
- Clearance below: 24.2 metres (79 ft)

History
- Construction start: 1998
- Construction end: 1999
- Inaugurated: 19 June 1999

The Åkviksundet Bridge (Norwegian: Åkviksundet bru) is a box girder bridge that crosses the Åkviksundet strait between the islands of Dønna and Staulen in Nordland county, Norway. Together with the Hoholmen Bridge, it forms the road connection between Herøy Municipality and Dønna Municipality. The bridge is 285 metres (935 ft) long, the longest of the three spans is 135 metres (443 ft), and the maximum clearance to the sea is 24.2 metres (79 ft). Jan-Eirik Nilsskog was the main engineer that built the bridge. The Åkviksundet Bridge was opened by King Harald V on 19 June 1999.

== See also ==
- List of bridges in Norway
- List of bridges in Norway by length
- List of bridges
- List of bridges by length
