= Indre Øksningan =

Island in Nordland, Norway

- Interactive map of Indre Øksningan

Geography
- Location: Nordland, Norway
- Coordinates: 65.9933°N 12.2304°E
- Archipelago: Øksningan
- Area: 2.3 km^{2} (0.89 sq mi)
- Length: 3.25 km (2.019 mi)
- Width: 1.4 km (0.87 mi)
- Highest elevation: 57.5 m (188.6 ft)
- Highest point: Matmorhågjen

Administration
- Norway
- County: Nordland
- Municipality: Herøy Municipality

Demographics
- Population: 78 (2016)

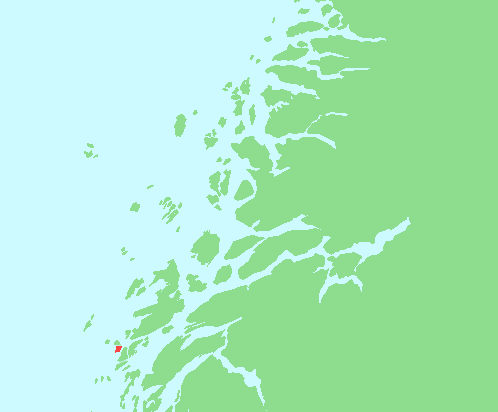
Locator map of Indre Øksningan in Nordland, Norway

Indre Øksningan (lit. 'Inner Øksningan') is an island in Herøy Municipality in Nordland county, Norway. Together with Ytre Øksningan, it is part of the Øksningan archipelago. The island has an area of 2.3 square kilometers (0.89 sq mi) and a population of 78 (2016). It is connected to the rest of Herøy by the Kalvøyrevet Bridge and Norwegian County Road 166.

== See also ==
- List of islands of Norway
