= Ytre Øksningan =

Island in Nordland, Norway

- Interactive map of Ytre Øksningan

Geography
- Location: Nordland, Norway
- Coordinates: 66.0053°N 12.2282°E
- Archipelago: Øksningan
- Area: 2.1 km^{2} (0.81 sq mi)
- Length: 2 km (1.2 mi)
- Width: 1.8 km (1.12 mi)
- Highest elevation: 98 m (322 ft)
- Highest point: Stortuva

Administration
- Norway
- County: Nordland
- Municipality: Herøy Municipality

Demographics
- Population: 58 (2016)

Ytre Øksningan (lit. 'Outer Øksningan') is an island in Herøy Municipality in Nordland county, Norway. Together with Indre Øksningan, it is part of the Øksningan archipelago. The island has an area of 2.1 square kilometers (0.81 sq mi) and a population of 58 (2016). It is connected to the rest of Herøy by Norwegian County Road 166. The largest village on the island is Innerøya on the southeast shore of the island.

== See also ==
- List of islands of Norway
