= Silvalen =

Silvalen Herøyholmen
- Village
- Interactive map of Silvalen
- Location within Nordland Location within Norway
- Coordinates: 65.9832°N 12.2886°E
- Country: Norway
- Region: Northern Norway
- County: Nordland
- District: Helgeland
- Municipality: Herøy Municipality

Area
  - Total: 0.98 km^{2} (0.38 sq mi)
- Elevation: 7 m (23 ft)

Population (2024)
  - Total: 860
  - Density: 878/km^{2} (2,270/sq mi)
- Time zone: UTC+01:00 (CET)
  - Summer (DST): UTC+02:00 (CEST)
- Post Code: 8850 Herøy

Silvalen or Herøyholmen is the administrative centre of Herøy Municipality in Nordland county, Norway. The village is located on two different islands, Nord-Herøy and Sør-Herøy, with the Herøysundet strait running between them. The Herøysundet Bridge crosses the strait, connecting both sides of the village. Herøy Church is located in the southern part of the village.

The 0.98-square-kilometre (240-acre) village has a population (2024) of 860 and a population density of 878 inhabitants per square kilometre (2,270/sq mi).
