= Herøy Municipality (Nordland) =

Municipality in Nordland, Norway

Herøy Municipality Herøy kommune
- Municipality
- Herø herred (historic name)
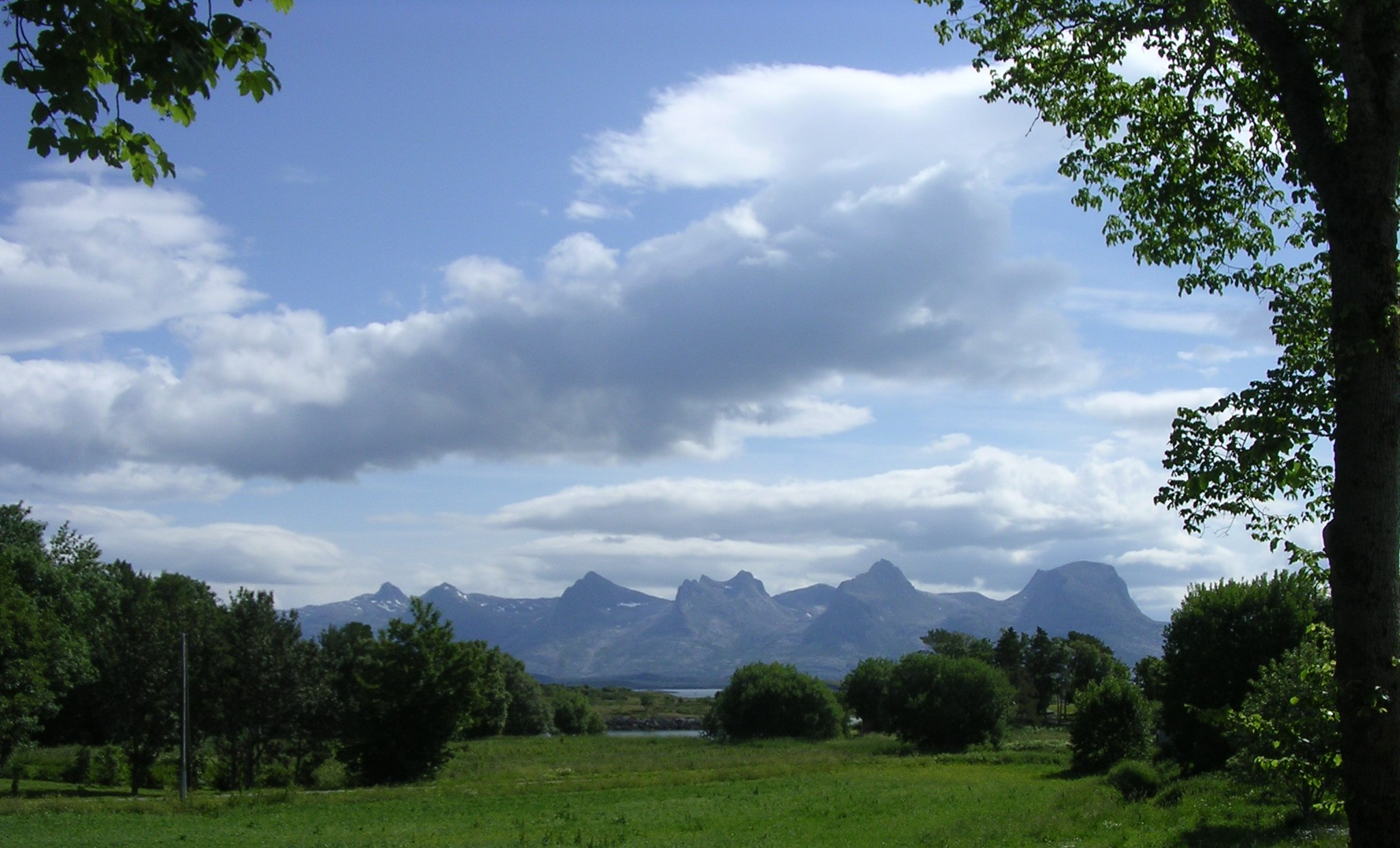
- De syv søstre mountains seen from Herøy

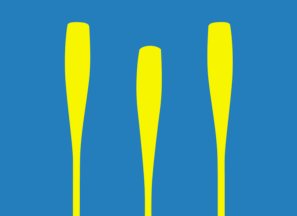
- Flag Coat of arms

- Nordland within Norway

- Herøy within Nordland
- Coordinates: 65°59′55″N 12°13′02″E
- Country: Norway
- County: Nordland
- District: Helgeland
- Established: 1864
  - Preceded by: Alstahaug Municipality
- Administrative centre: Silvalen

Government
  - Mayor (2019): Elbjørg Larsen (Ap)

Area
  - Total: 64.46 km^{2} (24.89 sq mi)
  - Land: 63.89 km^{2} (24.67 sq mi)
  - Water: 0.57 km^{2} (0.22 sq mi) 0.9%
  - Rank: #344 in Norway
- Highest elevation: 119.15 m (390.9 ft)

Population (2024)
  - Total: 1,842
  - Rank: #291 in Norway
  - Density: 28.6/km^{2} (74/sq mi)
  - Change (10 years): ▲ +6.3%
- Demonym: Herøyfjerding

Official language
  - Norwegian form: Bokmål
- Time zone: UTC+01:00 (CET)
  - Summer (DST): UTC+02:00 (CEST)
- ISO 3166 code: NO-1818
- Website: Official website

Herøy is a municipality in Nordland county, Norway. It is part of the Helgeland traditional region. The administrative centre of the municipality is the village of Silvalen. The island municipality is located about 15 kilometres (9.3 mi) west of the town of Sandnessjøen.

The 64-square-kilometre (25 sq mi) municipality is the 344th largest by area out of the 357 municipalities in Norway. Herøy Municipality is the 291st most populous municipality in Norway with a population of 1,842. The municipality's population density is 28.6 inhabitants per square kilometre (74/sq mi) and its population has increased by 6.3% over the previous 10-year period.

== General information ==
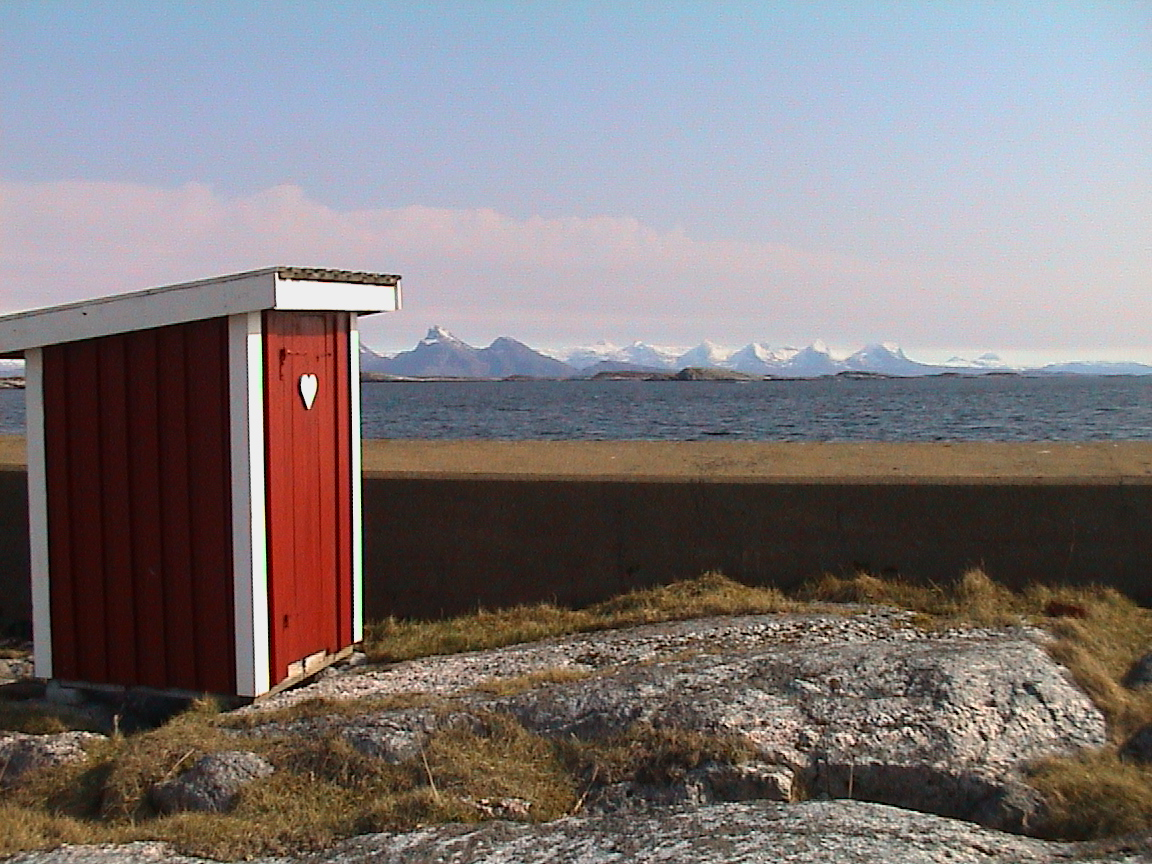
Restroom with a view

The municipality of Herøy was established in 1864 when it was separated from Alstahaug Municipality. Initially the population of Herøy was 2,438. On 1 July 1917, the northern district of Herøy (population: 1,530) was separated from Herøy to become the new Nordvik Municipality. This left Herøy with 2,555 residents.

During the 1960s, there were many municipal mergers across Norway due to the work of the Schei Committee. On 1 January 1962 the part of Herøy Municipality on the island of Dønna (population: 19) was transferred to the new Dønna Municipality. On 1 January 1965 the Husvær/Sandværet island groups (population: 461) were transferred from Alstahaug Municipality to Herøy Municipality.

=== Name ===
The municipality (originally the parish) is named after the islands of Søndre Herøya and Nordre Herøya (Old Norse: Herøyjar). The first element is herr which means "army" (here in the sense of skipaherr which means "military fleet"). The last element is the definite form of øy which means "island". The sound between the islands was probably a meeting place for the Leidang fleet of the district. Historically, the name of the municipality was spelled Herø. On 6 January 1908, a royal resolution changed the spelling of the name of the municipality to Herøy.

=== Coat of arms ===
The coat of arms was granted on 3 July 1987. The official blazon is "Azure, three oars Or issuant from the base, the central one abased" (Norwegian: I blått tre oppvoksende gull årer, den midterste nedsenket). This means the arms have a blue field (background) and the charge is three vertical oars arranged in a horizontal row, with the middle oar, slightly lower. The oars have a tincture of Or which means it is commonly colored yellow, but if it is made out of metal, then gold is used. The blue color in the field symbolizes the importance of the ocean for the island municipality. The oar was chosen to represent the importance of boats. The municipal name comes from the Old Norse word "herr" which means a military meeting place, i.e. the place where fleet gathers. Thus the arms are canting. The arms were designed by Jarle E. Henriksen.

=== Churches ===
The Church of Norway has one parish (sokn) within Herøy Municipality. It is part of the Nord-Helgeland prosti (deanery) in the Diocese of Sør-Hålogaland.

Churches in Herøy Municipality
Parish (sokn)	Church name	Location of the church	Year built
Herøy	Herøy Church	Silvalen	12th century
Herøy	Gåsvær Chapel	Gåsvær	1951
Herøy	Husvær Chapel	Husvær	1936
Herøy	Sandvær Chapel	Sandværet	1947

== Geography ==
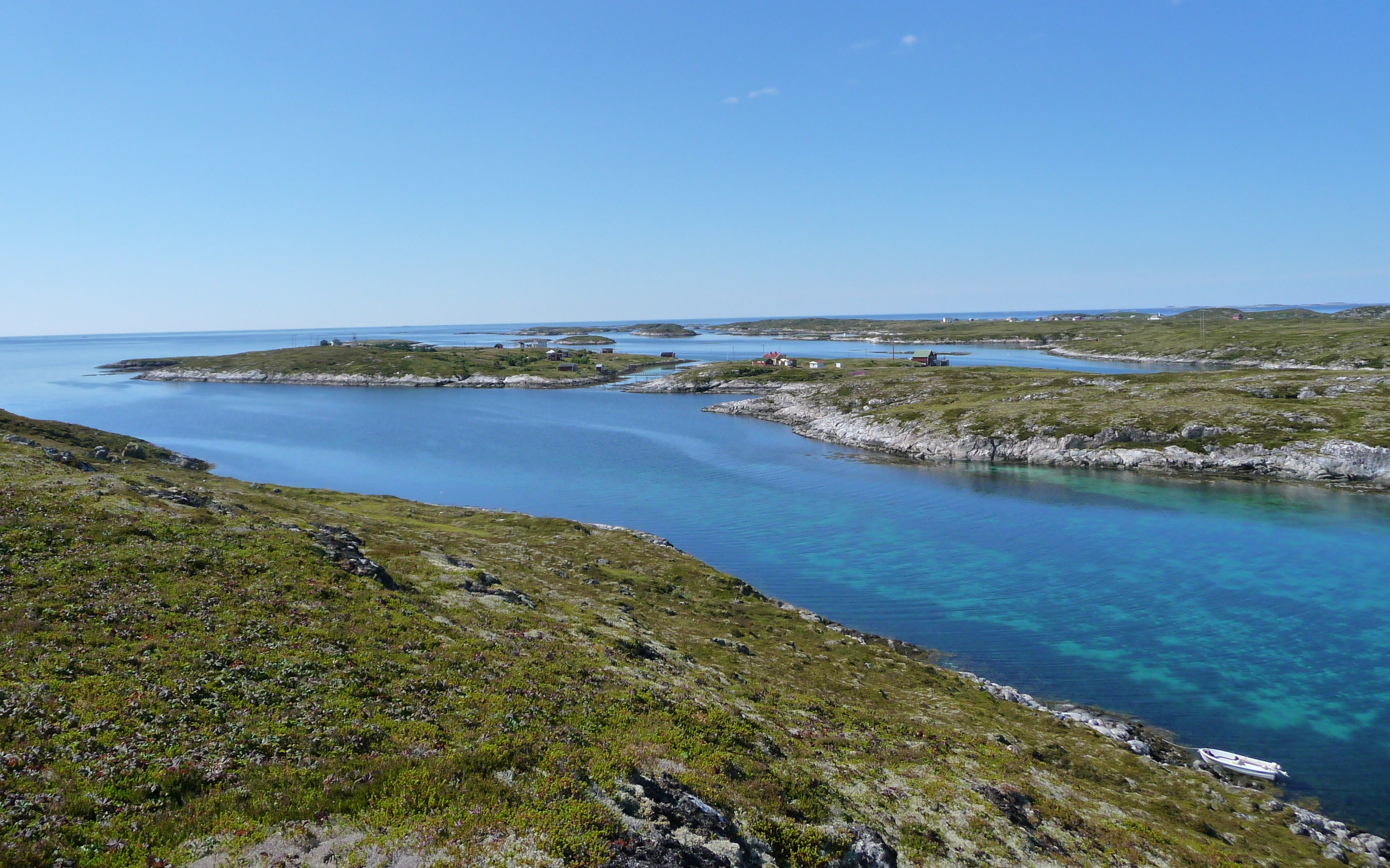
View of Gåsvær

The municipality of Herøy consists of about 1,700 little islands and islets. The main islands are Nord-Herøy, Sør-Herøy, Tenna, Ytre Øksningan, Indre Øksningan, Seløya, and Staulen— all of which are connected by bridges including Åkviksundet Bridge, Hoholmen Bridge, Kalvøyrevet Bridge. Most islands are low and close to the sea surface. The highest point in the municipality is the 119.15-metre (390.9 ft) tall mountain Vardøyfjellet on the island of Vardøya.

There are also several smaller outlying island groups such as Gåsvær, Husvær, and Sandværet. Ytterholmen Lighthouse is located in the far western part of the municipality.

== Government ==
Herøy Municipality is responsible for primary education (through 10th grade), outpatient health services, senior citizen services, welfare and other social services, zoning, economic development, and municipal roads and utilities. The municipality is governed by a municipal council of directly elected representatives. The mayor is indirectly elected by a vote of the municipal council. The municipality is under the jurisdiction of the Helgeland District Court and the Hålogaland Court of Appeal.

=== Municipal council ===
The municipal council (Kommunestyre) of Herøy Municipality is made up of 19 representatives that are elected to four year terms. The tables below show the current and historical composition of the council by political party.

Herøy kommunestyre 2023–2027
Party name (in Norwegian)	Number of representatives
Labour Party (Arbeiderpartiet)	10
Progress Party (Fremskrittspartiet)	4
Herøy Local List (Herøy Bygdeliste)	5
Total number of members:	19

Herøy kommunestyre 2019–2023
Party name (in Norwegian)	Number of representatives
Labour Party (Arbeiderpartiet)	8
Conservative Party (Høyre)	3
Centre Party (Senterpartiet)	4
Herøy Local List (Herøy Bygdeliste)	4
Total number of members:	19

Herøy kommunestyre 2015–2019
Party name (in Norwegian)	Number of representatives
Labour Party (Arbeiderpartiet)	12
Progress Party (Fremskrittspartiet)	2
Centre Party (Senterpartiet)	2
Socialist Left Party (Sosialistisk Venstreparti)	1
Joint list of the Conservative Party (Høyre) and the Liberal Party (Venstre)	2
Total number of members:	19

Herøy kommunestyre 2011–2015
Party name (in Norwegian)	Number of representatives
Labour Party (Arbeiderpartiet)	11
Progress Party (Fremskrittspartiet)	3
Joint list of the Conservative Party (Høyre), Centre Party (Senterpartiet), and Liberal Party (Venstre)	5
Total number of members:	19

Herøy kommunestyre 2007–2011
Party name (in Norwegian)	Number of representatives
Labour Party (Arbeiderpartiet)	11
Progress Party (Fremskrittspartiet)	3
Conservative Party (Høyre)	1
Centre Party (Senterpartiet)	3
Socialist Left Party (Sosialistisk Venstreparti)	1
Total number of members:	19

Herøy kommunestyre 2003–2007
Party name (in Norwegian)	Number of representatives
Labour Party (Arbeiderpartiet)	9
Progress Party (Fremskrittspartiet)	2
Conservative Party (Høyre)	2
Centre Party (Senterpartiet)	2
Socialist Left Party (Sosialistisk Venstreparti)	2
Total number of members:	17

Herøy kommunestyre 1999–2003
Party name (in Norwegian)	Number of representatives
Labour Party (Arbeiderpartiet)	9
Conservative Party (Høyre)	5
Socialist Left Party (Sosialistisk Venstreparti)	1
Joint list of the Centre Party (Senterpartiet), Christian Democratic Party (Kristelig Folkeparti), and Liberal Party (Venstre)	6
Total number of members:	21

Herøy kommunestyre 1995–1999
Party name (in Norwegian)	Number of representatives
Labour Party (Arbeiderpartiet)	11
Conservative Party (Høyre)	4
Socialist Left Party (Sosialistisk Venstreparti)	1
Joint list of the Centre Party (Senterpartiet), Christian Democratic Party (Kristelig Folkeparti), and Liberal Party (Venstre)	5
Total number of members:	21

Herøy kommunestyre 1991–1995
Party name (in Norwegian)	Number of representatives
Labour Party (Arbeiderpartiet)	12
Conservative Party (Høyre)	2
Socialist Left Party (Sosialistisk Venstreparti)	2
Joint list of the Centre Party (Senterpartiet), Christian Democratic Party (Kristelig Folkeparti), and Liberal Party (Venstre)	5
Total number of members:	21

Herøy kommunestyre 1987–1991
Party name (in Norwegian)	Number of representatives
Labour Party (Arbeiderpartiet)	12
Conservative Party (Høyre)	3
Joint list of the Centre Party (Senterpartiet), Christian Democratic Party (Kristelig Folkeparti), and Liberal Party (Venstre)	6
Total number of members:	21

Herøy kommunestyre 1983–1987
Party name (in Norwegian)	Number of representatives
Labour Party (Arbeiderpartiet)	15
Conservative Party (Høyre)	3
Christian Democratic Party (Kristelig Folkeparti)	1
Centre Party (Senterpartiet)	1
Liberal Party (Venstre)	1
Total number of members:	21

Herøy kommunestyre 1979–1983
Party name (in Norwegian)	Number of representatives
Labour Party (Arbeiderpartiet)	13
Conservative Party (Høyre)	4
Christian Democratic Party (Kristelig Folkeparti)	2
Centre Party (Senterpartiet)	1
Liberal Party (Venstre)	1
Total number of members:	21

Herøy kommunestyre 1975–1979
Party name (in Norwegian)	Number of representatives
Labour Party (Arbeiderpartiet)	13
Conservative Party (Høyre)	2
Christian Democratic Party (Kristelig Folkeparti)	4
Centre Party (Senterpartiet)	2
Total number of members:	21

Herøy kommunestyre 1971–1975
Party name (in Norwegian)	Number of representatives
Labour Party (Arbeiderpartiet)	12
Conservative Party (Høyre)	3
Christian Democratic Party (Kristelig Folkeparti)	3
Centre Party (Senterpartiet)	2
Liberal Party (Venstre)	1
Total number of members:	21

Herøy kommunestyre 1967–1971
Party name (in Norwegian)	Number of representatives
Labour Party (Arbeiderpartiet)	16
Conservative Party (Høyre)	4
Christian Democratic Party (Kristelig Folkeparti)	3
Centre Party (Senterpartiet)	1
Liberal Party (Venstre)	1
Total number of members:	25

Herøy kommunestyre 1963–1967
Party name (in Norwegian)	Number of representatives
Labour Party (Arbeiderpartiet)	12
Joint List(s) of Non-Socialist Parties (Borgerlige Felleslister)	6
Local List(s) (Lokale lister)	3
Total number of members:	21

Herøy herredsstyre 1959–1963
Party name (in Norwegian)	Number of representatives
Labour Party (Arbeiderpartiet)	9
Joint List(s) of Non-Socialist Parties (Borgerlige Felleslister)	5
Local List(s) (Lokale lister)	7
Total number of members:	21

Herøy herredsstyre 1955–1959
Party name (in Norwegian)	Number of representatives
Labour Party (Arbeiderpartiet)	9
Joint List(s) of Non-Socialist Parties (Borgerlige Felleslister)	12
Total number of members:	21

Herøy herredsstyre 1951–1955
Party name (in Norwegian)	Number of representatives
Labour Party (Arbeiderpartiet)	10
Joint List(s) of Non-Socialist Parties (Borgerlige Felleslister)	10
Local List(s) (Lokale lister)	1
Total number of members:	21

Herøy herredsstyre 1947–1951
Party name (in Norwegian)	Number of representatives
Labour Party (Arbeiderpartiet)	8
Joint List(s) of Non-Socialist Parties (Borgerlige Felleslister)	5
Local List(s) (Lokale lister)	8
Total number of members:	21

Herøy herredsstyre 1945–1947
Party name (in Norwegian)	Number of representatives
Labour Party (Arbeiderpartiet)	5
List of workers, fishermen, and small farmholders (Arbeidere, fiskere, småbrukere liste)	5
Local List(s) (Lokale lister)	11
Total number of members:	21

Herøy herredsstyre 1937–1941*
Party name (in Norwegian)	Number of representatives
Labour Party (Arbeiderpartiet)	5
Local List(s) (Lokale lister)	11
Total number of members:	16
Note: Due to the German occupation of Norway during World War II, no elections were held for new municipal councils until after the war ended in 1945.

=== Mayors ===
The mayor (Norwegian: ordfører) of Herøy Municipality is the political leader of the municipality and the chairperson of the municipal council. Here is a list of people who have held this position:

- 1864–1864: Andreas Christian Bech
- 1865–1876: Paul Smith
- 1876–1878: Evert Johannessen
- 1879–1880: Hans Herman Hansen
- 1881–1886: Hans Mørk Smith
- 1887–1910: Hans J. Mørk
- 1911–1912: Sigvard Nielsen
- 1913–1913: Helmer Tømmervik
- 1914–1915: Marius Sørensen
- 1915–1917: Hans Johnsen
- 1918–1919: Helmer Tømmervik
- 1920–1920: Marius Sørensen
- 1920–1922: Johannes Ødegaard Dietrichson
- 1923–1923: Gudolf Havig
- 1924–1934: Hans Johansen
- 1935–1937: Harald Drøpping
- 1937–1938: Ivar Helbekkmo
- 1938–1942: Norvald Lundestad
- 1942–1943: Hjalmar Jacobsen
- 1943–1944: Asbjørn Mo
- 1945–1945: Gudolf Havig
- 1946–1946: Jon Holmefjord
- 1946–1952: Henning Edvardsen
- 1952–1954: Birger Bjerkelo
- 1954–1956: Torbjørn Grønbech
- 1957–1959: Harald Zahl Braseth
- 1960–1971: Helge N. Olsen
- 1971–1987: Steinar Furu (Ap)
- 1987–1999: Arnt Frode Jensen (Ap)
- 1999–2003: Unni Hansen (Sp)
- 2003–2019: Arnt Frode Jensen (Ap)
- 2019–present: Elbjørg Larsen (Ap)

== Economy ==
The main industries in the municipality is fishing, fish farming and processing activities associated with this. Other important industries are agriculture, transportation, service industries, and tourism.

== Notable people ==
- Petter Dass (ca.1647 – 1707), a Lutheran priest and the foremost Norwegian poet of his generation
- Benjamin Dass (1706 at Skar farm in Alstahaug, Herøy – 1775), an educator, scholar, and Rector of Trondheim Cathedral School
