= Nesna =

Nesna may refer to:

== Places ==
- Nesna Municipality, a municipality in Nordland county, Norway
- Nesna (village), a village in Nesna Municipality in Nordland county, Norway
- Nesna Church, a church in Nesna Municipality in Nordland county, Norway
- "Nesna campus" of Nord University (formerly Nesna University College)
