= Hugla =

Island in Nordland, Norway

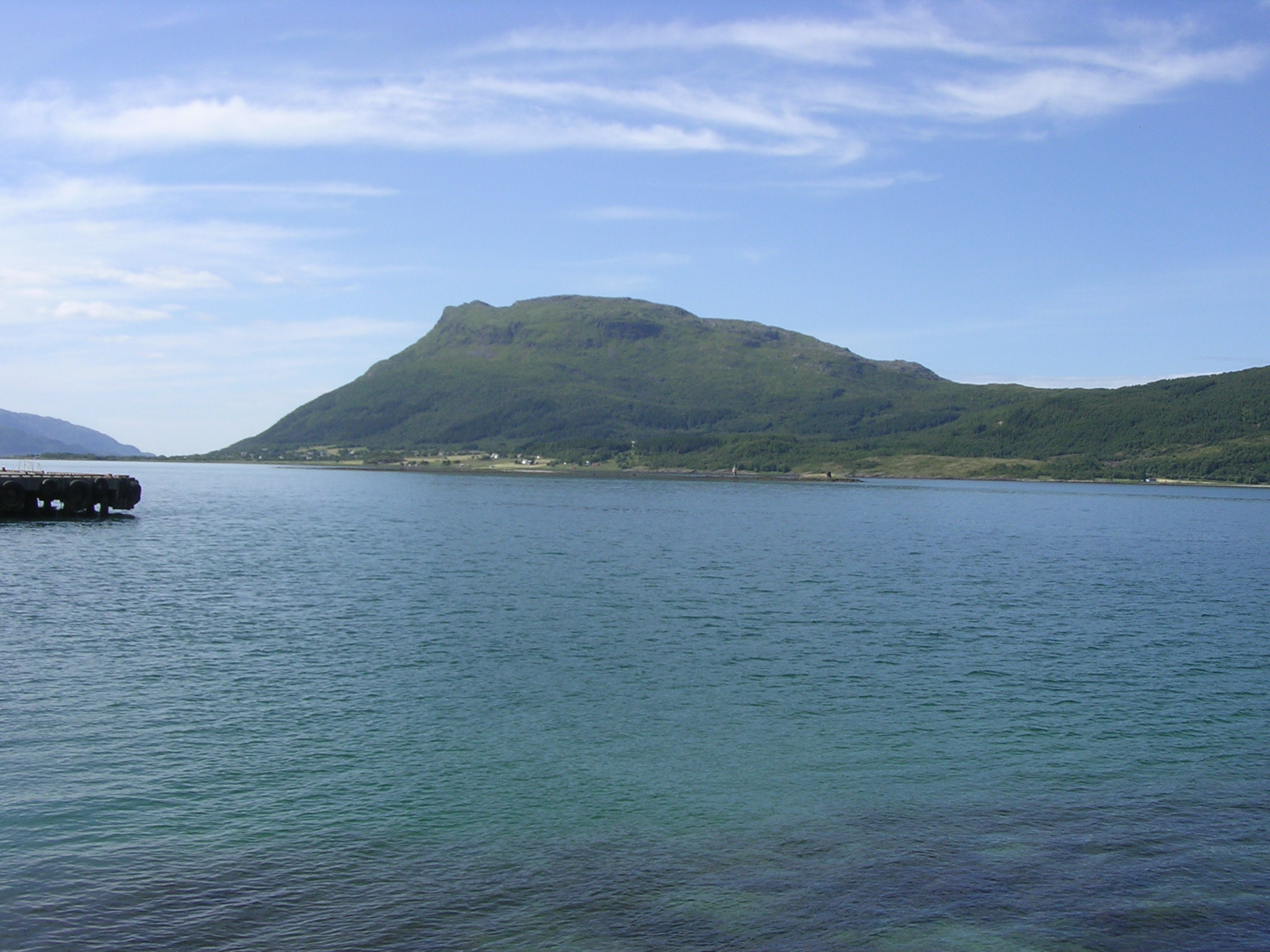
- View of the southern part of Hugla
- Interactive map of Hugla

Geography
- Location: Nordland, Norway
- Coordinates: 66.1873°N 12.9177°E
- Area: 17.9 km^{2} (6.9 sq mi)
- Length: 7 km (4.3 mi)
- Width: 4.5 km (2.8 mi)
- Highest elevation: 629 m (2064 ft)
- Highest point: Huggeltind

Administration
- Norway
- County: Nordland
- Municipality: Nesna Municipality

Hugla is an island in Nesna Municipality in Nordland county, Norway. The 17.9-square-kilometre (6.9 sq mi) island lies south of the islands of Tomma and Handnesøya, west of the mainland of Nesna Municipality, east of the island of Løkta, and north of the Ranfjorden. The residents of the island live mostly on the eastern coast, across the fjord from the village of Nesna.

Map of Nesna

The majority of the settlement is located in the east of the island, which is connected to Nesna by a car ferry. The island has a school and a small shop.

== See also ==
- List of islands of Norway
