= Nesna (village) =

Village in Nesna Municipality, Norway

- Village
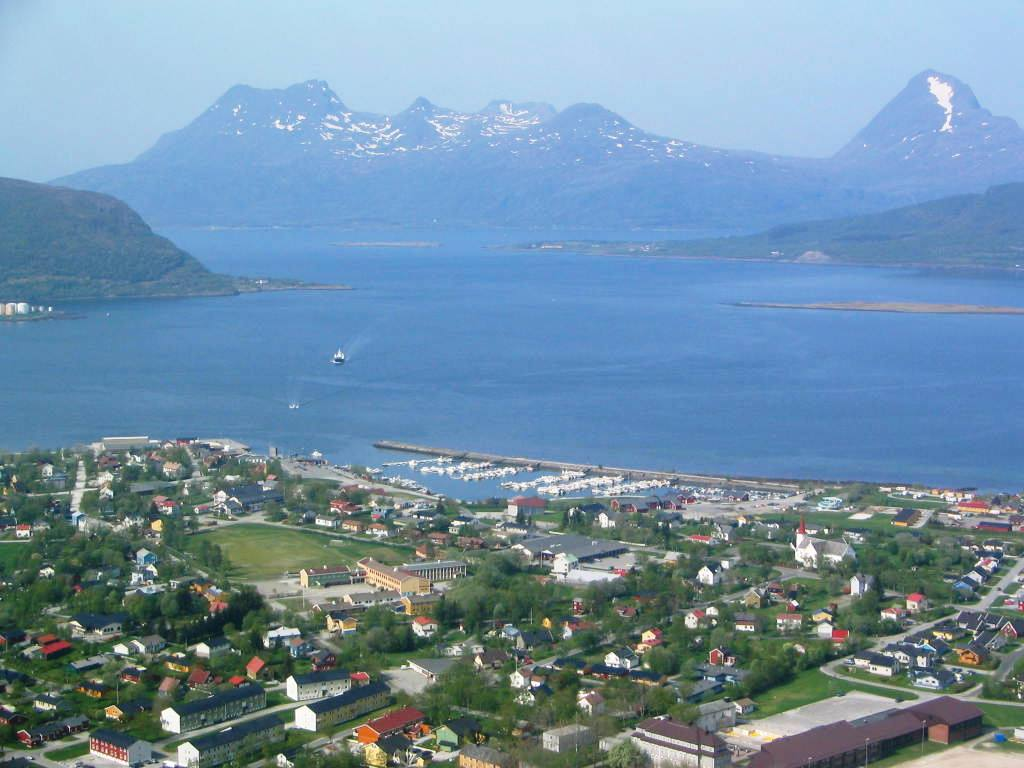
- View of the village
- Interactive map of Nesna
- Location within Nordland Location within Norway
- Coordinates: 66.1982°N 13.0184°E
- Country: Norway
- Region: Northern Norway
- County: Nordland
- District: Helgeland
- Municipality: Nesna Municipality

Area
  - Total: 1.08 km^{2} (0.42 sq mi)
- Elevation: 10 m (33 ft)

Population (2023)
  - Total: 1,346
  - Density: 1,246/km^{2} (3,230/sq mi)
- Time zone: UTC+01:00 (CET)
  - Summer (DST): UTC+02:00 (CEST)
- Post Code: 8700 Nesna

Nesna is the administrative centre of Nesna Municipality in Nordland county, Norway. The village is located on a peninsula on the mainland of Norway, along the Nesnakroken strait, just north of the Ranfjorden and south of the Sjona fjord. The Norwegian County Road 17 crosses the Ranfjorden on a ferry which docks in the village before heading north along the coastline. Nesna has regular ferry connections to the nearby islands of Handnesøya, Hugla, and Tomma.

The 1.08-square-kilometre (270-acre) village has a population (2023) of 1,346 and a population density of 1,246 inhabitants per square kilometre (3,230/sq mi).

Nesna Church is located in the village, and the village is also host to a campus of Nord University.

== Media gallery ==
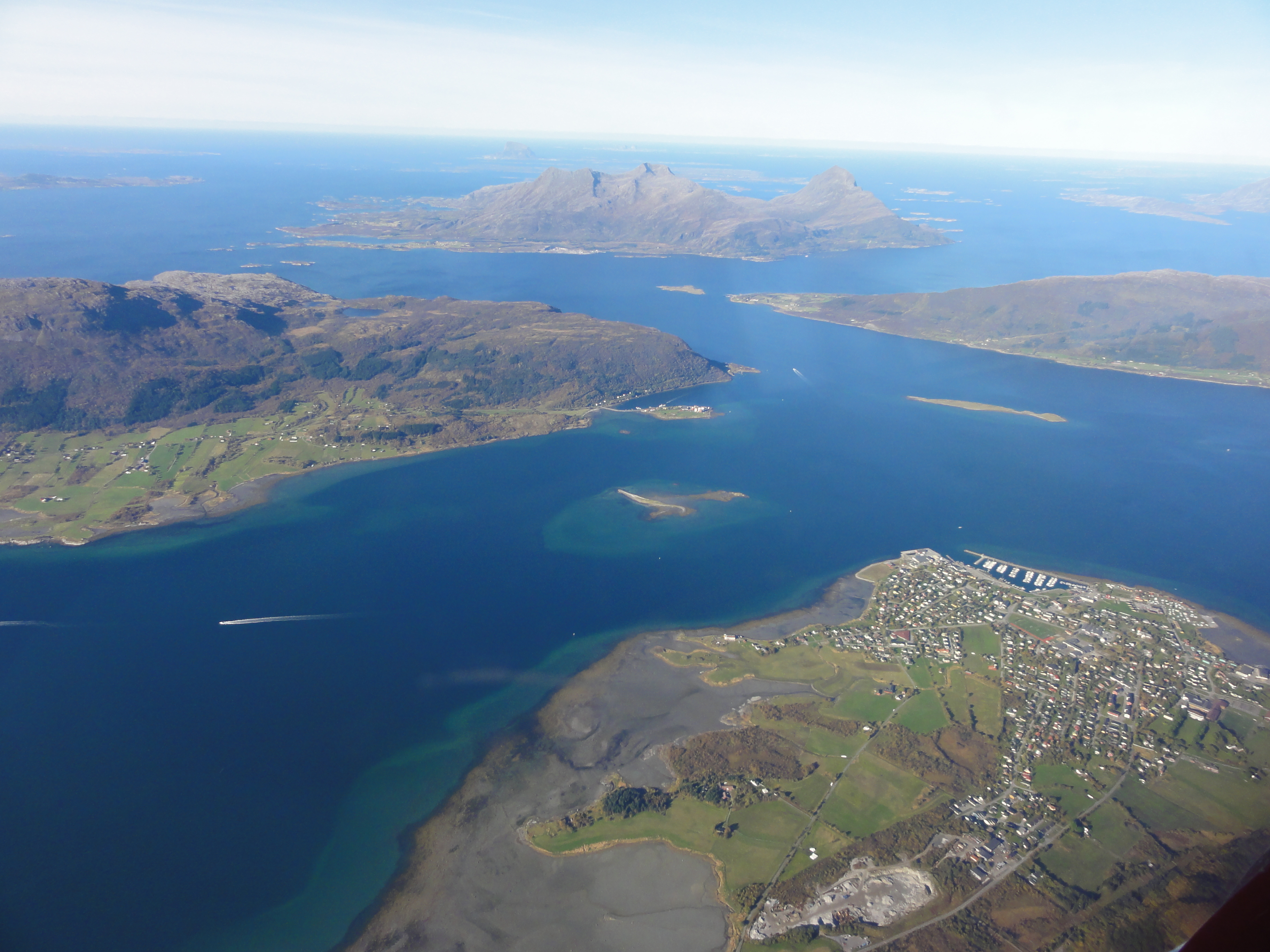
The village in the lower right corner.

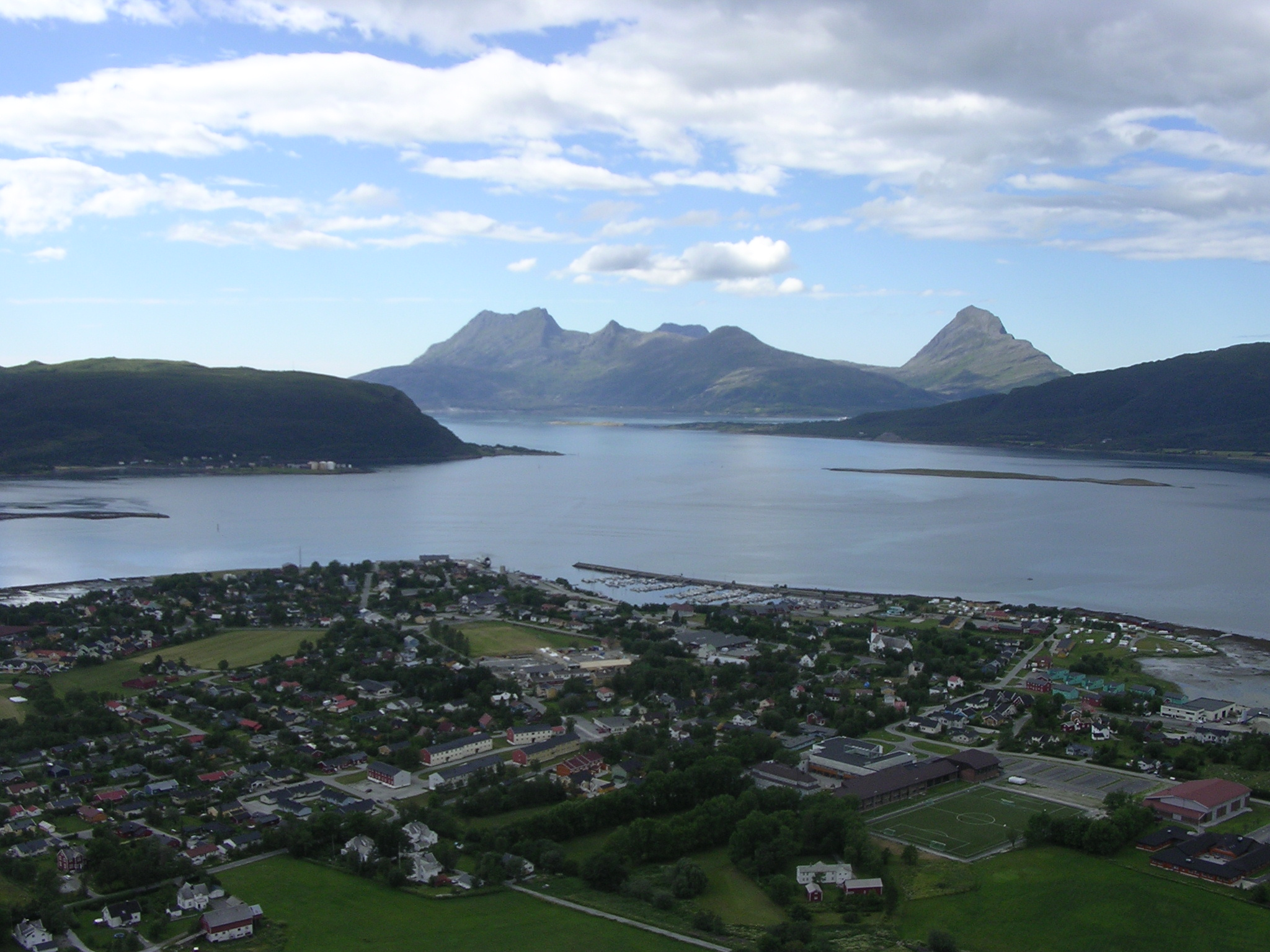
Aerial view looking northwest

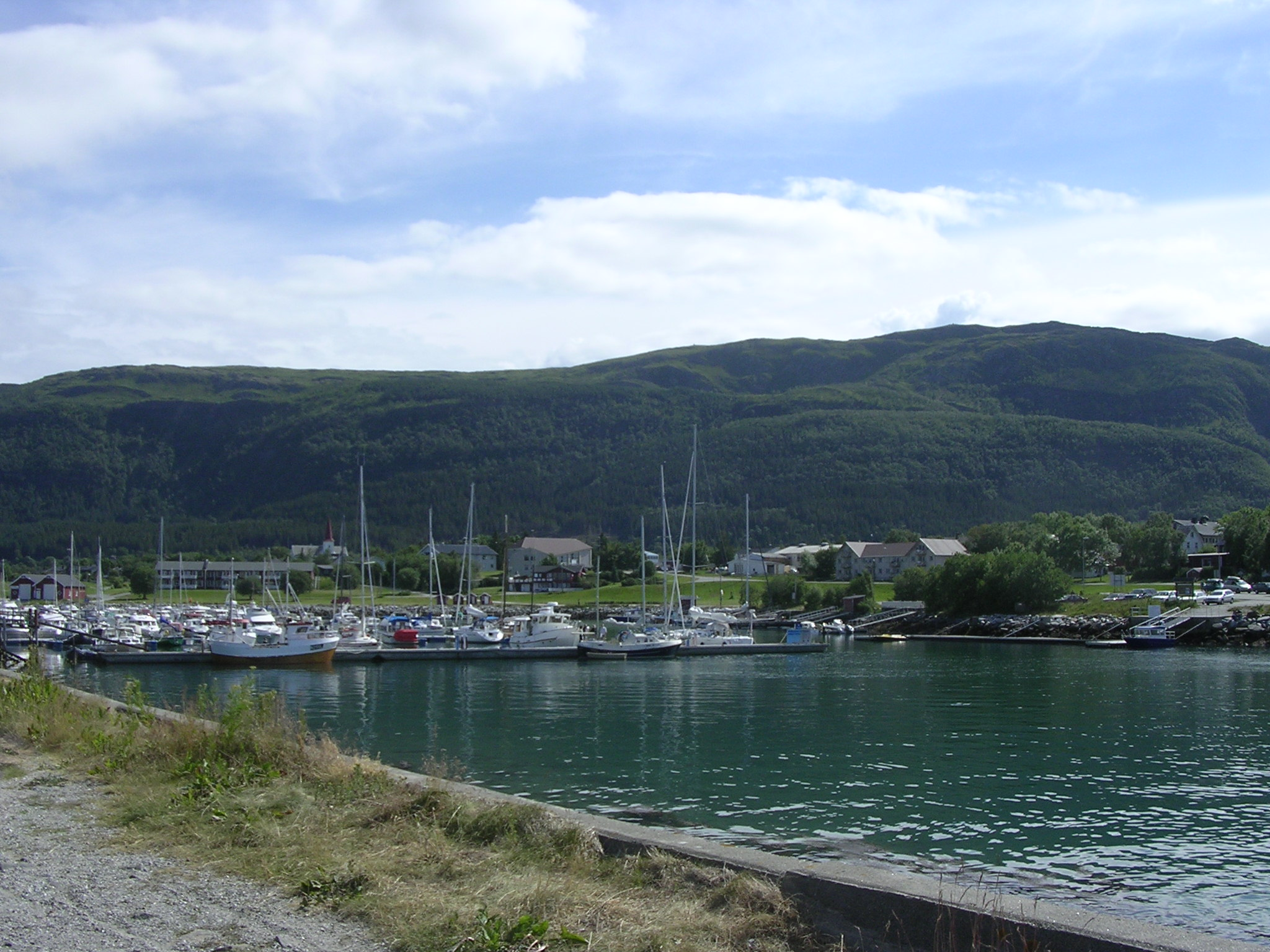
Harbour view

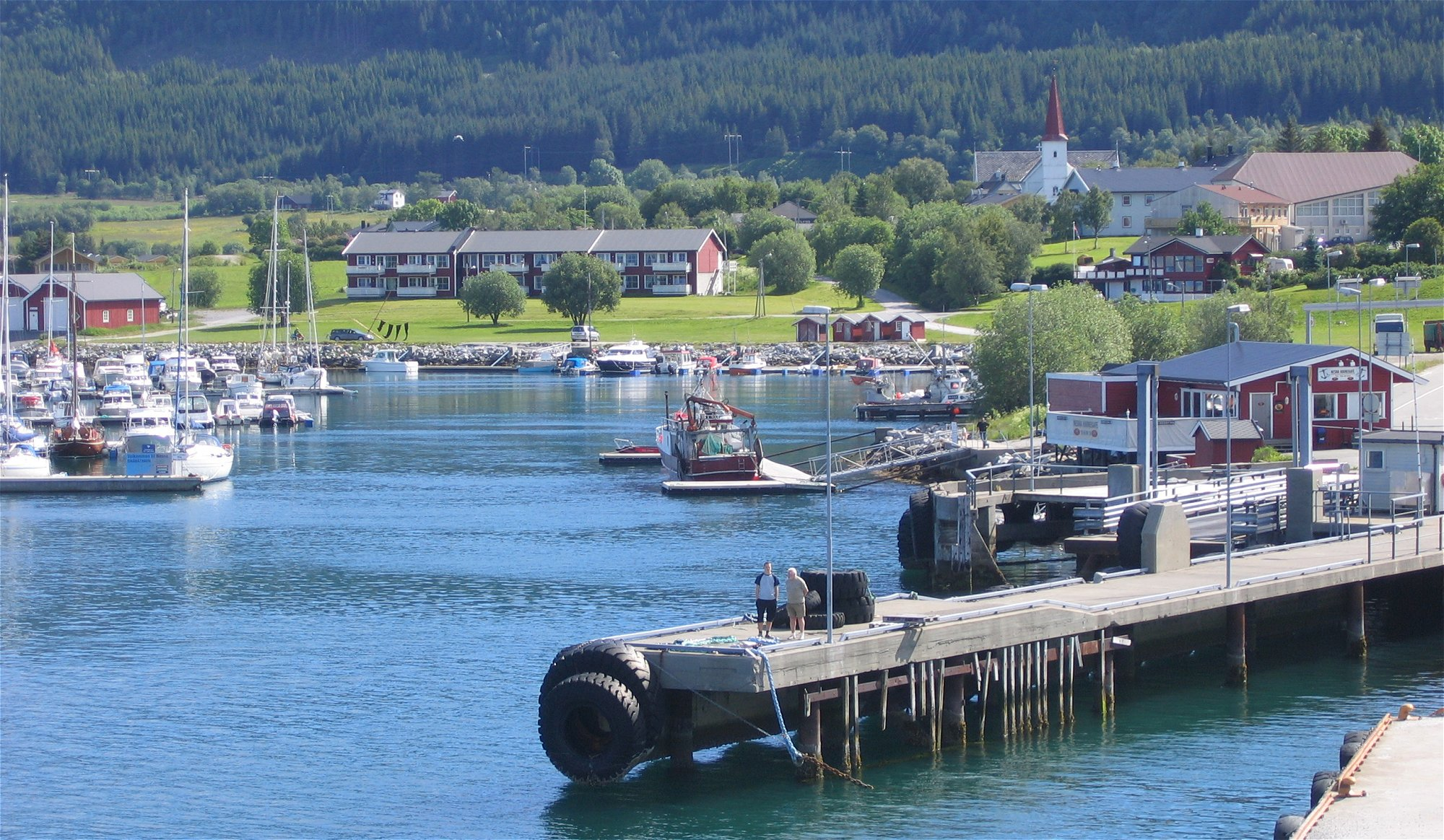
Harbour view

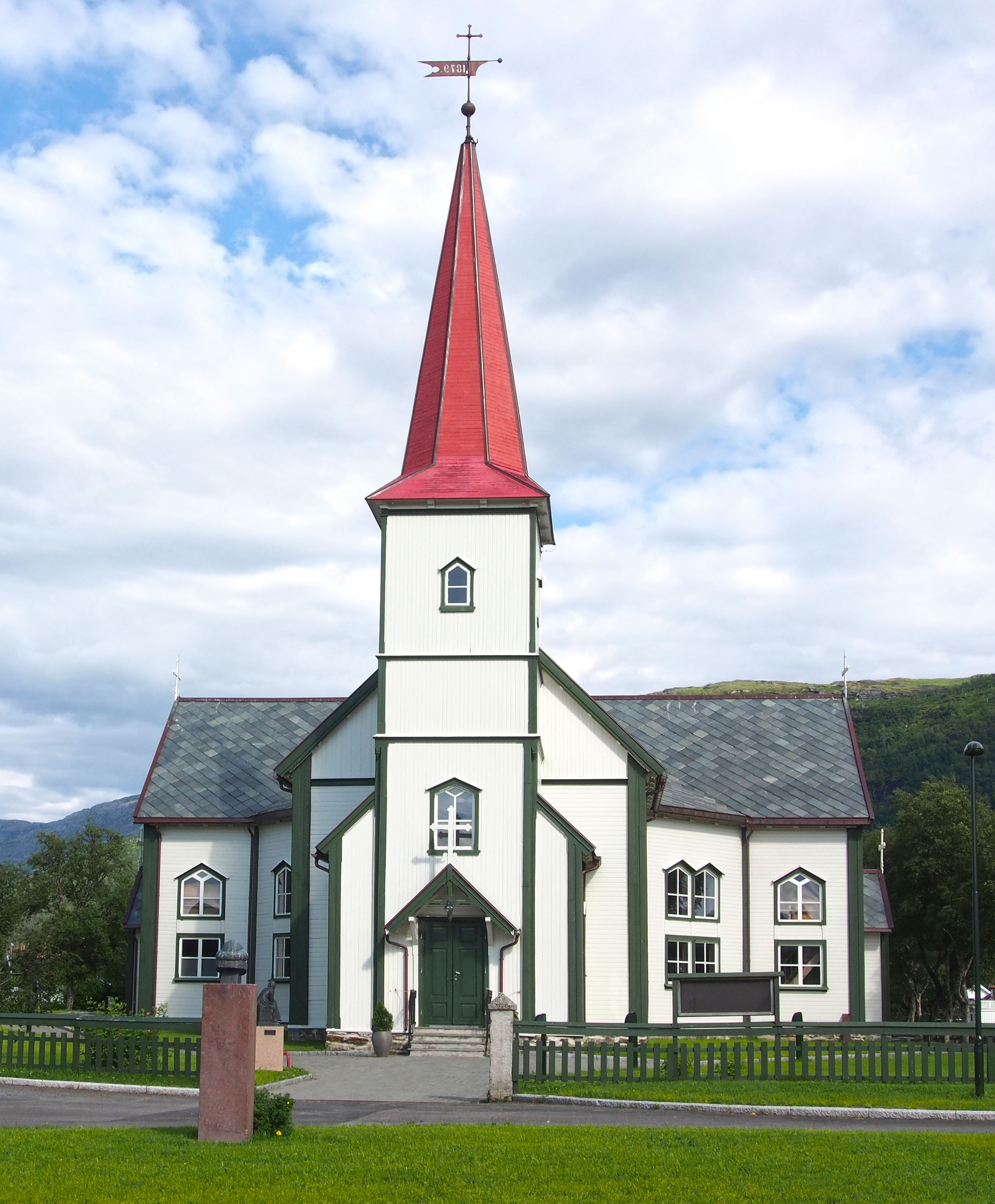
Nesna Church

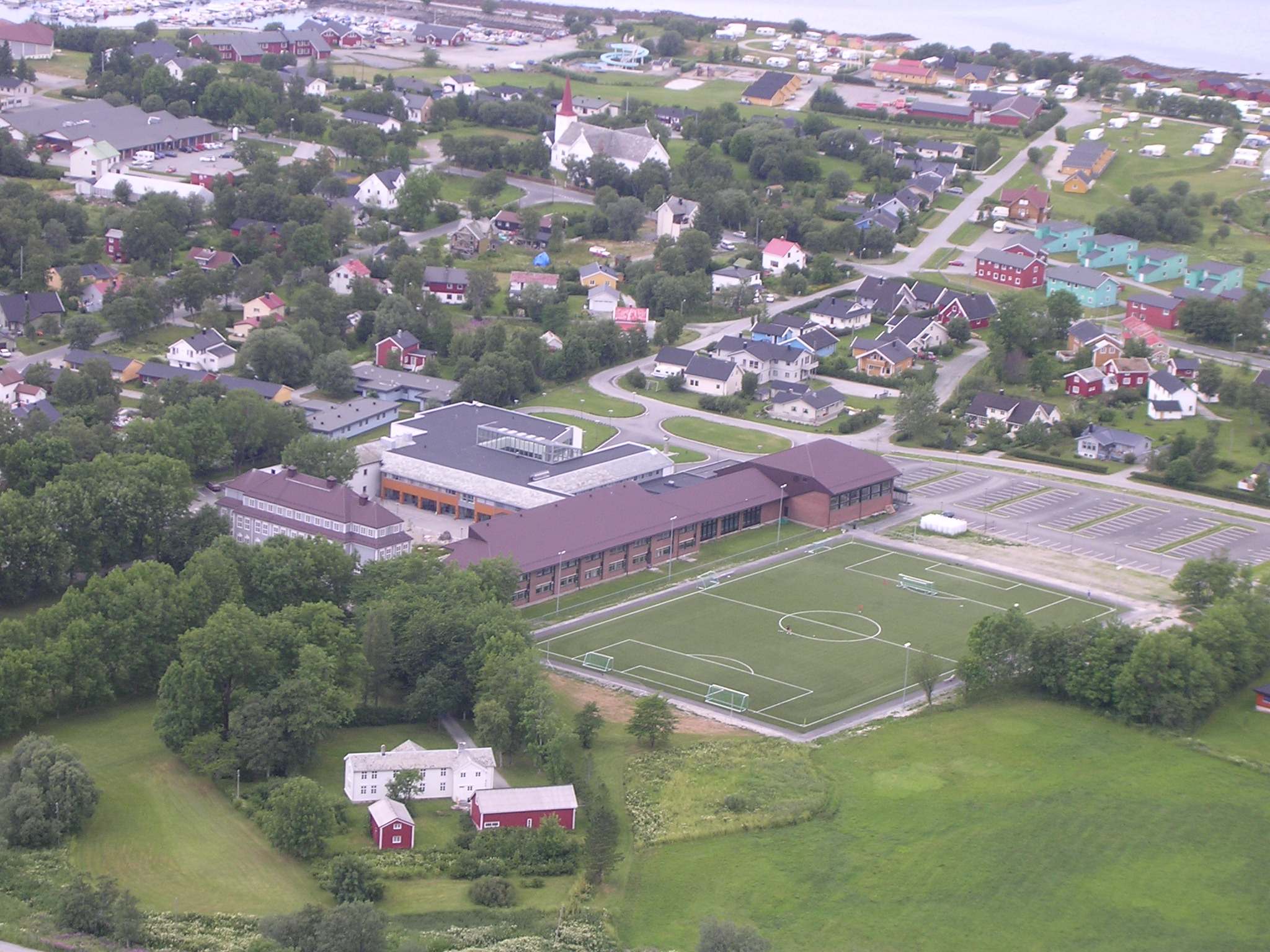
Nord University
