= Handnesøya =

Island in Nesna, Norway

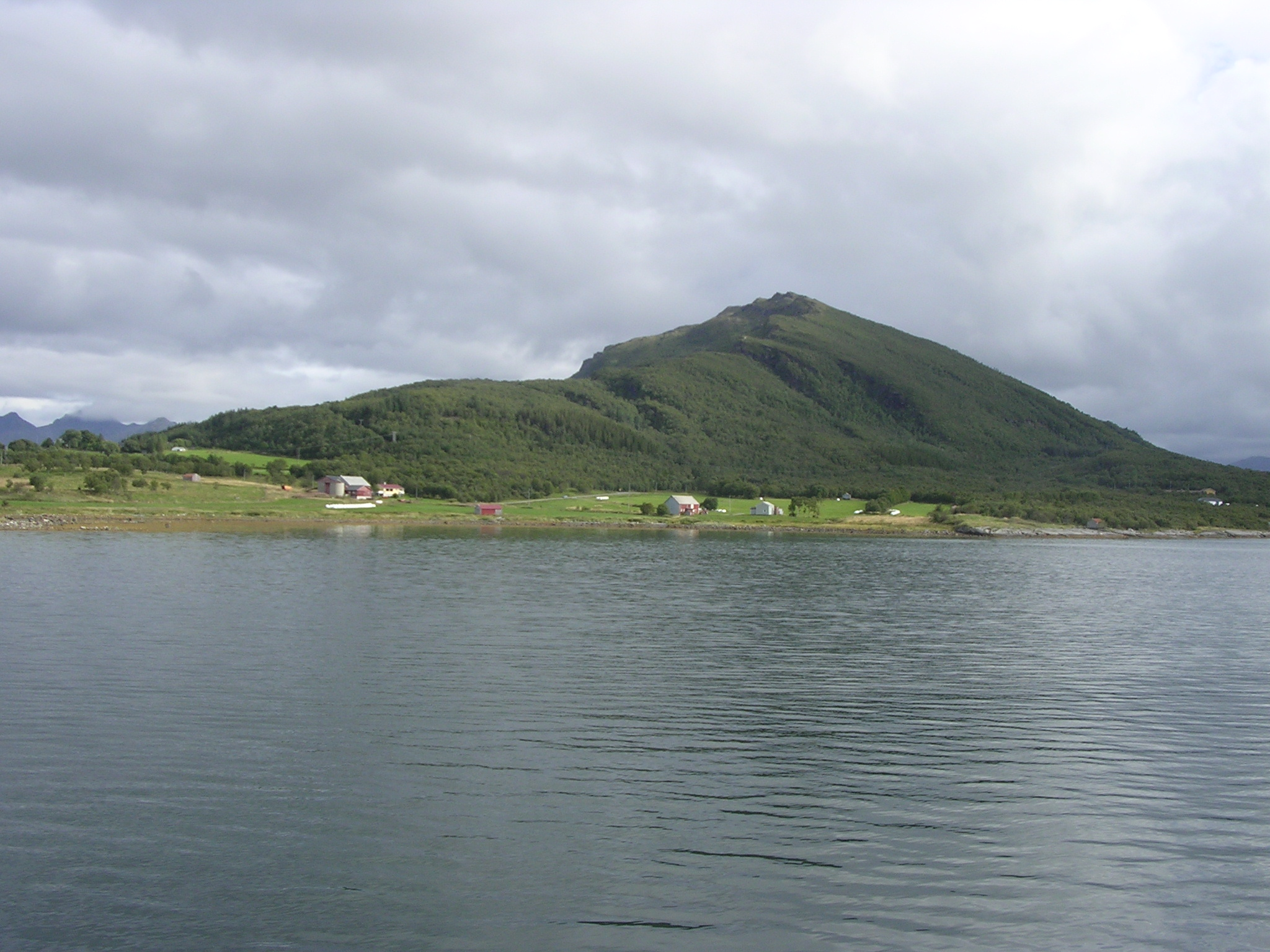
- View of the island (from the south)
- Interactive map of Handnesøya

Geography
- Location: Nordland, Norway
- Coordinates: 66.2624°N 13.0409°E
- Area: 34.4 km^{2} (13.3 sq mi)
- Length: 13 km (8.1 mi)
- Width: 4 km (2.5 mi)
- Highest elevation: 599 m (1965 ft)
- Highest point: Stokkatinden

Administration
- Norway
- County: Nordland
- Municipality: Nesna Municipality

Handnesøya is an island in Nesna Municipality in Nordland county, Norway. The 34.4-square-kilometre (13.3 sq mi) island lies between the islands of Tomma and Hugla and the mainland, along the Sjona fjord. The mountainous island has a very narrow flat areas on the east and west sides where the island's residents live. There is a ferry connection from the village of Handnesneset on the southern tip of the island to the village of Nesna on the mainland and to the island of Tomma. Handnesøya Chapel is located in the village of Saura on the western side of the island.

Map of Nesna

== See also ==
- List of islands of Norway
