= Saura, Nordland =

Village in Nesna Municipality, Norway

Saura
- Village
- Interactive map of Saura
- Location within Nordland Location within Norway
- Coordinates: 66.2326°N 12.9886°E
- Country: Norway
- Region: Northern Norway
- County: Nordland
- District: Helgeland
- Municipality: Nesna Municipality
- Elevation: 22 m (72 ft)
- Time zone: UTC+01:00 (CET)
  - Summer (DST): UTC+02:00 (CEST)
- Post Code: 8724 Saura

Saura is a village in Nesna Municipality in Nordland county, Norway. It is located on the southeastern side of the island of Handnesøya. It is the location of Handnesøya Chapel, some small shops, and a dock.
