= Handnesøya Chapel =

Church in Nordland, Norway

- Handnesøya kapell
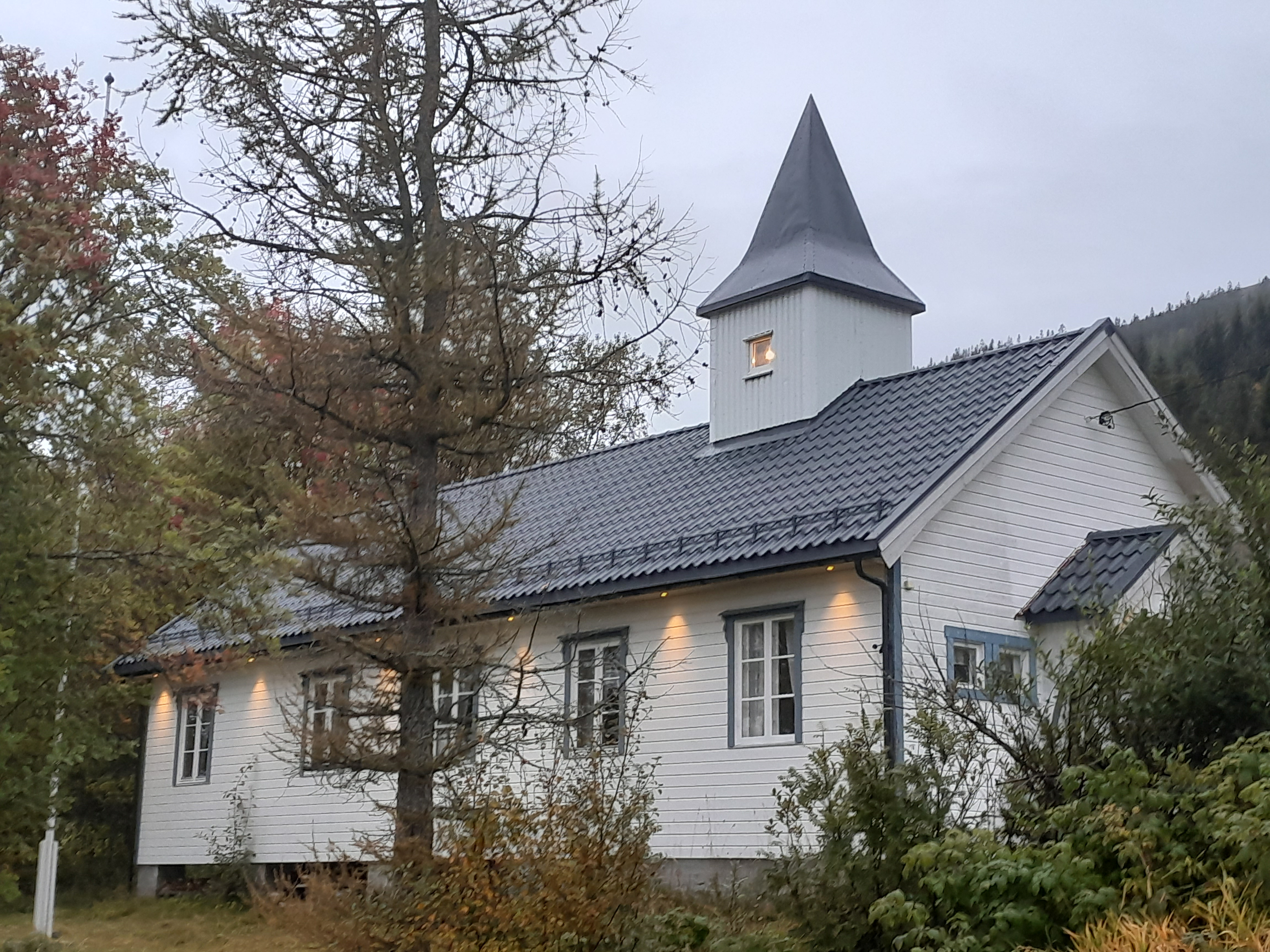
- View of the chapel
- Handnesøya Chapel
- 66.2353555°N 13.004227°E
- Location: Nesna Municipality, Nordland
- Country: Norway
- Denomination: Church of Norway
- Churchmanship: Evangelical Lutheran

History
- Status: Chapel
- Founded: 1921
- Consecrated: June 1969

Architecture
- Functional status: Active
- Architectural type: Long church
- Completed: 1921 (105 years ago)

Specifications
- Capacity: 70
- Materials: Wood

Administration
- Diocese: Sør-Hålogaland
- Deanery: Nord-Helgeland prosti
- Parish: Nesna
- Norwegian Cultural Heritage Site
- Type: Church
- Status: Not protected
- ID: 84479

Handnesøya Chapel (Norwegian: Handnesøya kapell) is a chapel of the Church of Norway in Nesna Municipality in Nordland county, Norway. It is located in the village of Saura on the southeastern shore of the island of Handnesøya. It is an annex chapel in the Nesna parish which is part of the Nord-Helgeland prosti (deanery) in the Diocese of Sør-Hålogaland. The white, wooden chapel was built in a long church style in 1921. The chapel seats about 70 people.

== History ==
The local villagers erected the Handnesøya Chapel on a voluntary basis, and it was to serve as a church building for the island of Handnesøya. From the beginning, the chapel was organized as a privately owned prayer house. During the 1960s, a cooperative was formed by the villagers who became the formal owner of the church building. In June 1969, after an extensive restoration and extension, the prayer house was consecrated as an annex chapel by the Bishop of Sør-Hålogaland.

== See also ==
- List of churches in Sør-Hålogaland
