= Nesna Church =

Church in Nordland, Norway

- Nesna kirke
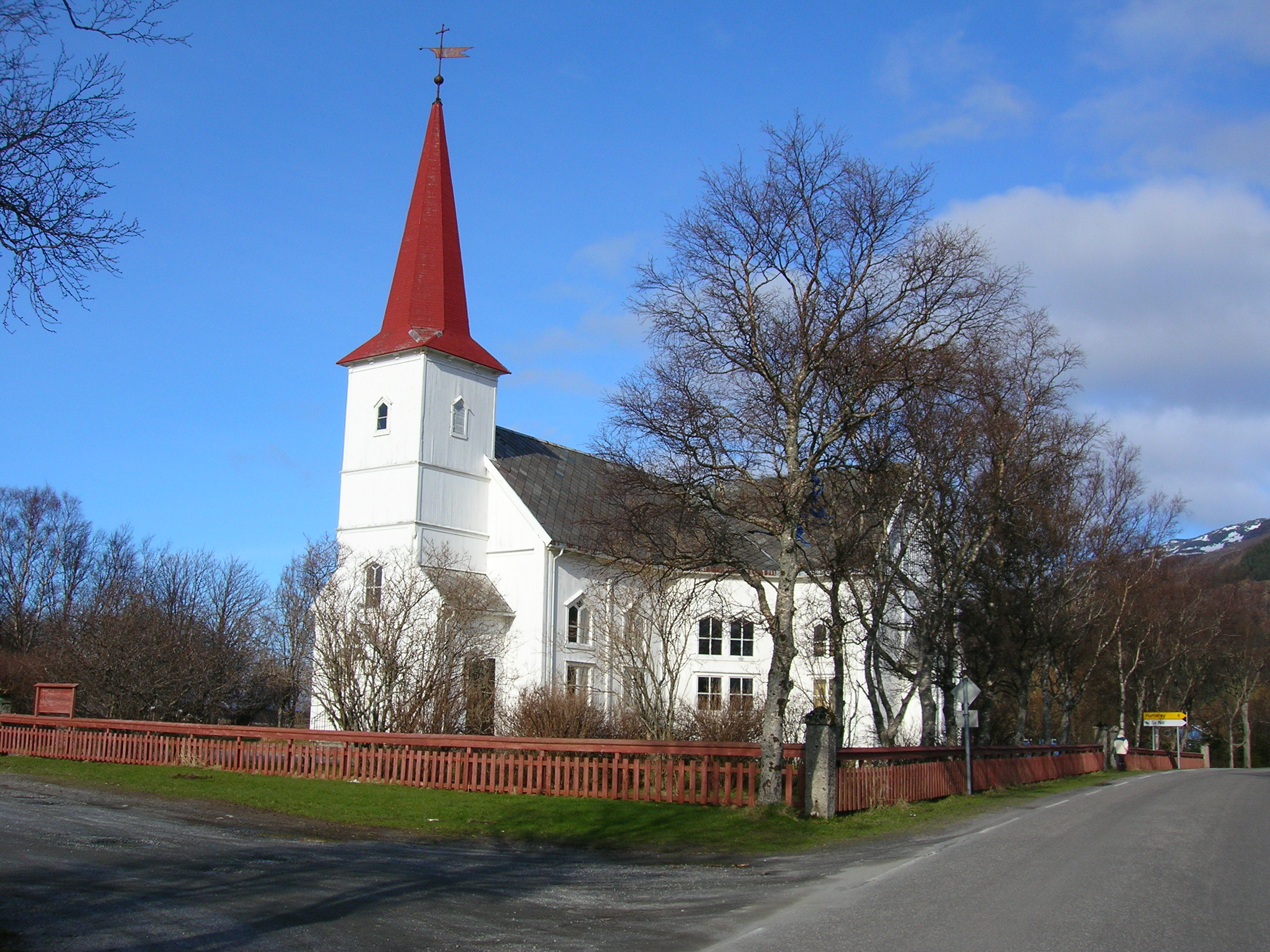
- View of the church
- Nesna Church
- 66.2005027°N 13.0255848°E
- Location: Nesna Municipality, Nordland
- Country: Norway
- Denomination: Church of Norway
- Churchmanship: Evangelical Lutheran

History
- Status: Parish church
- Founded: 15th century
- Consecrated: 17 Sept 1880

Architecture
- Functional status: Active
- Architect: Niels S.D. Eckhoff
- Architectural type: Octagonal cruciform
- Style: Neo-Gothic
- Completed: 1880 (146 years ago)

Specifications
- Capacity: 480
- Materials: Wood

Administration
- Diocese: Sør-Hålogaland
- Deanery: Nord-Helgeland prosti
- Parish: Nesna
- Norwegian Cultural Heritage Site
- Type: Church
- Status: Listed
- ID: 85122

Nesna Church (Norwegian: Nesna kirke) is a parish church of the Church of Norway in Nesna Municipality in Nordland county, Norway. It is located in the village of Nesna and it serves as the main church for the Nesna parish, which is part of the Nord-Helgeland prosti (deanery) in the Diocese of Sør-Hålogaland. The white, neo-gothic, wooden church was built in an octagonal cruciform style in 1880, based on plans drawn up by the architect Niels Stockfleth Darre Eckhoff. The church seats about 480 people.

== History ==
The earliest existing historical records of the church date back to the year 1589, but the church altarpiece is dated to the 1470s, suggesting that the church was likely founded around that time. The first church at Nesna was built about 50 metres (160 ft) north of the present. In 1666, a church inspection reported that the building was in need of major repairs, which were likely carried out soon afterwards. By 1750, the church was described as very neglected. In 1767, the old church was torn down, and a new church was constructed on the same site. It was a timber-framed, cruciform building painted red on the exterior.

In 1814, this church served as an election church (Norwegian: valgkirke). Together with more than 300 other parish churches across Norway, it acted as a polling station for elections to the 1814 Norwegian Constituent Assembly, which drafted the Constitution of Norway. This marked Norway's first national elections. Each church parish was a constituency that elected people called "electors" who later convened in each county to elect the representatives for the assembly that would meet at Eidsvoll Manor later that year.

By 1880, the congregation had outgrown the small church, so a new church was built about 50 metres (160 ft) south of the old church. After the new church was completed, the old church was torn down and the materials were sold. The new church was consecrated on 17 September 1880. This building also had cruciform shape, but slightly modified. The inner corners of the cruciform design were cut off, forming more of an octagonal central area.

== Media gallery ==
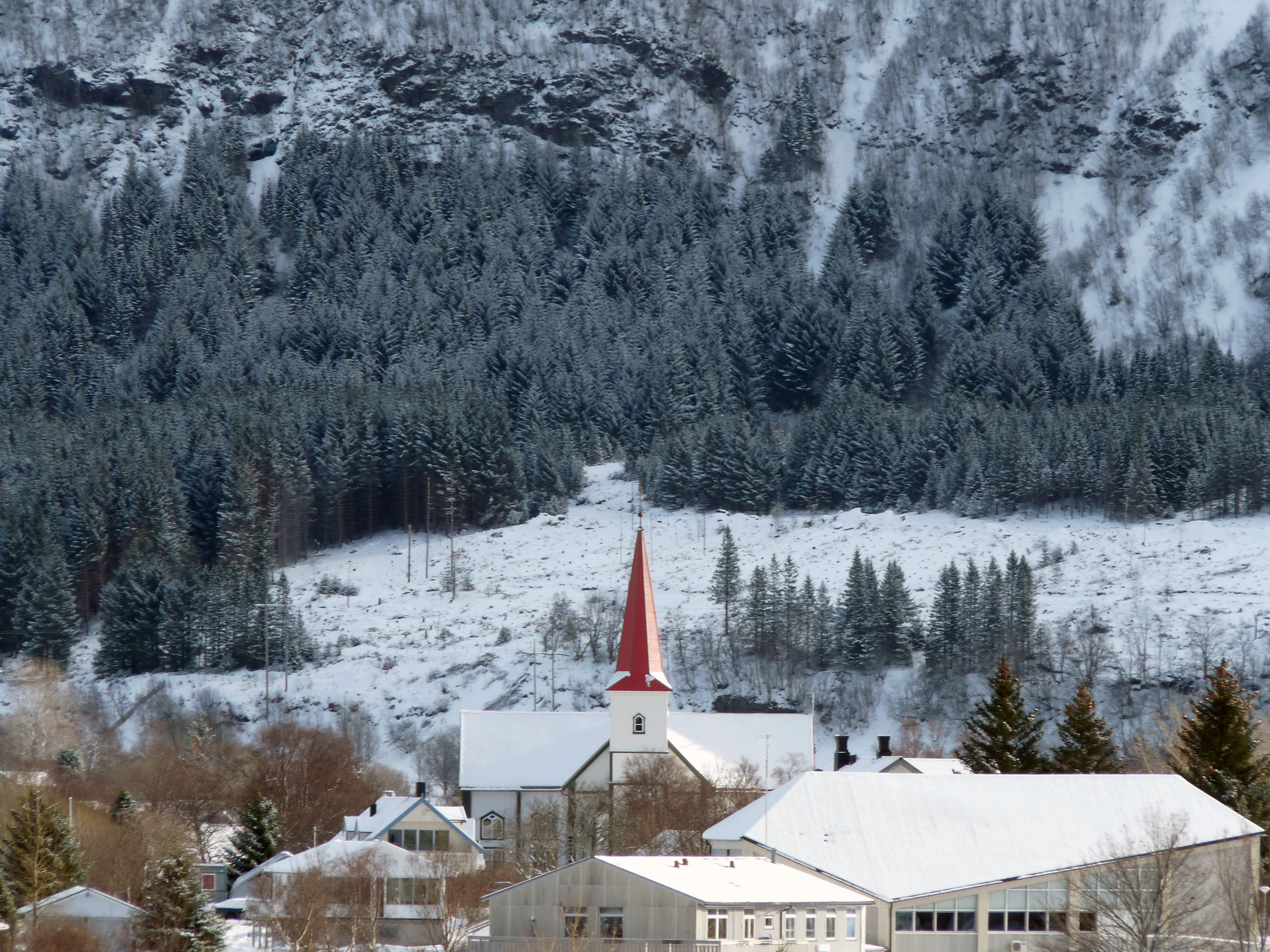

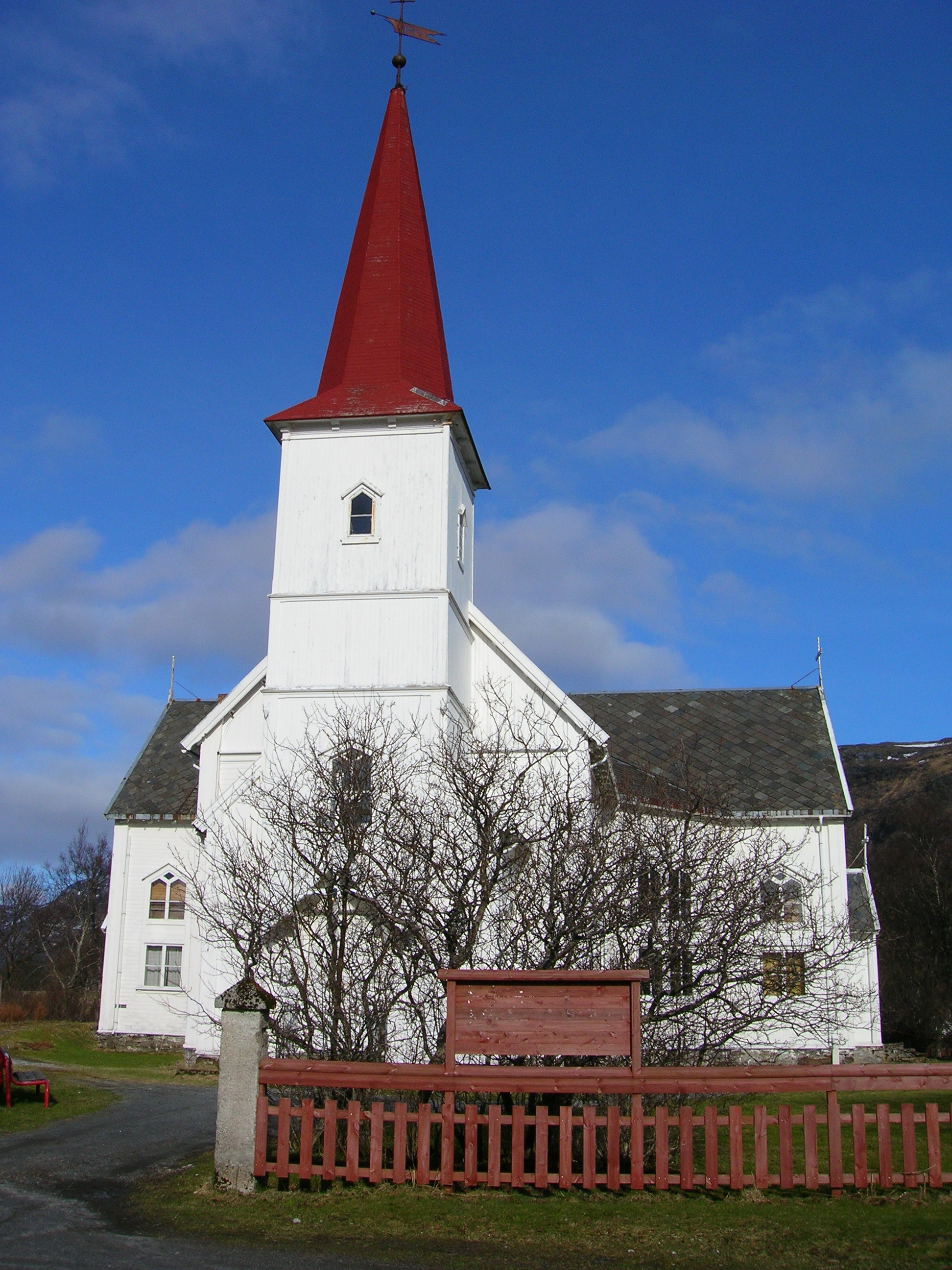

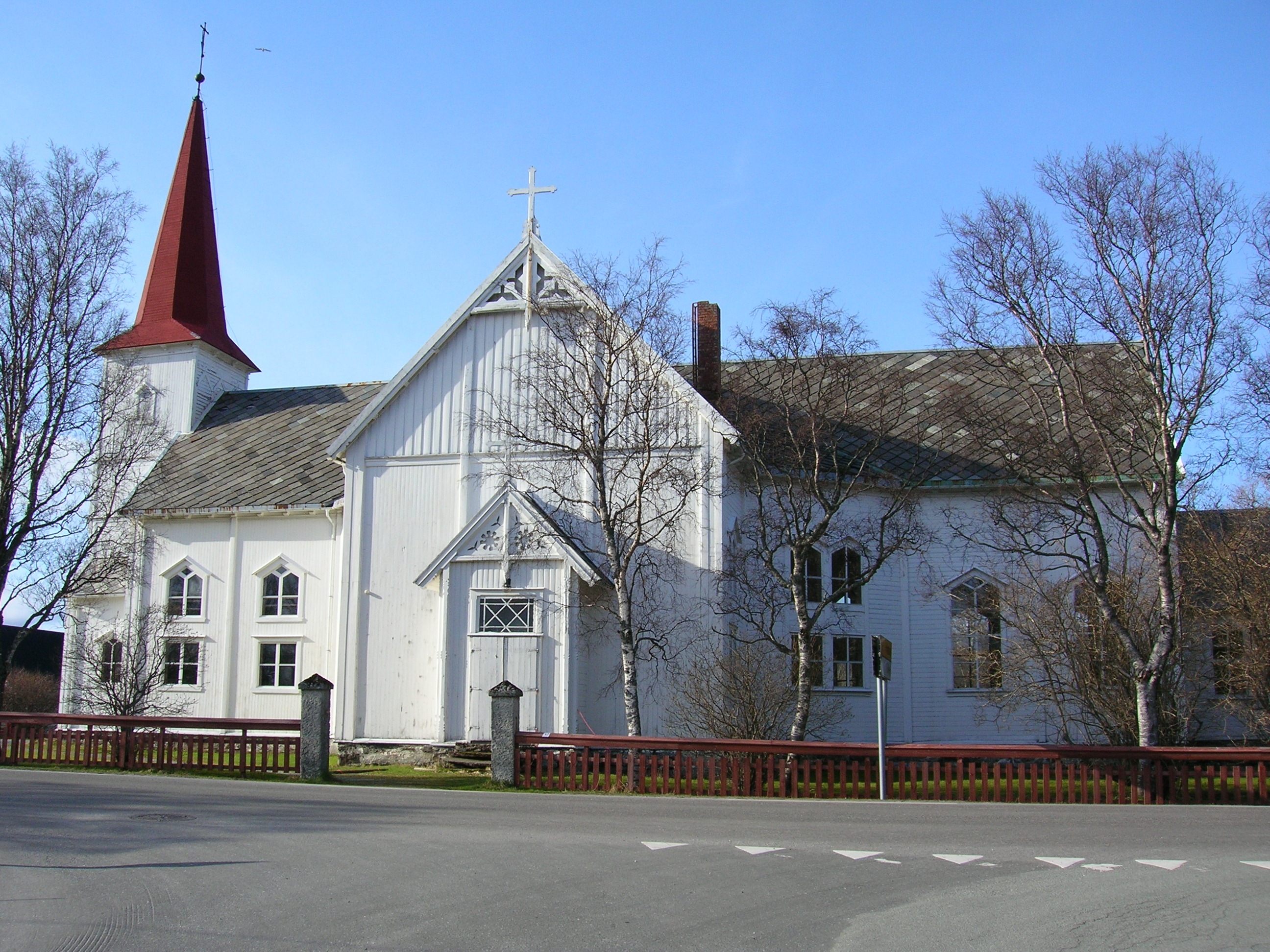

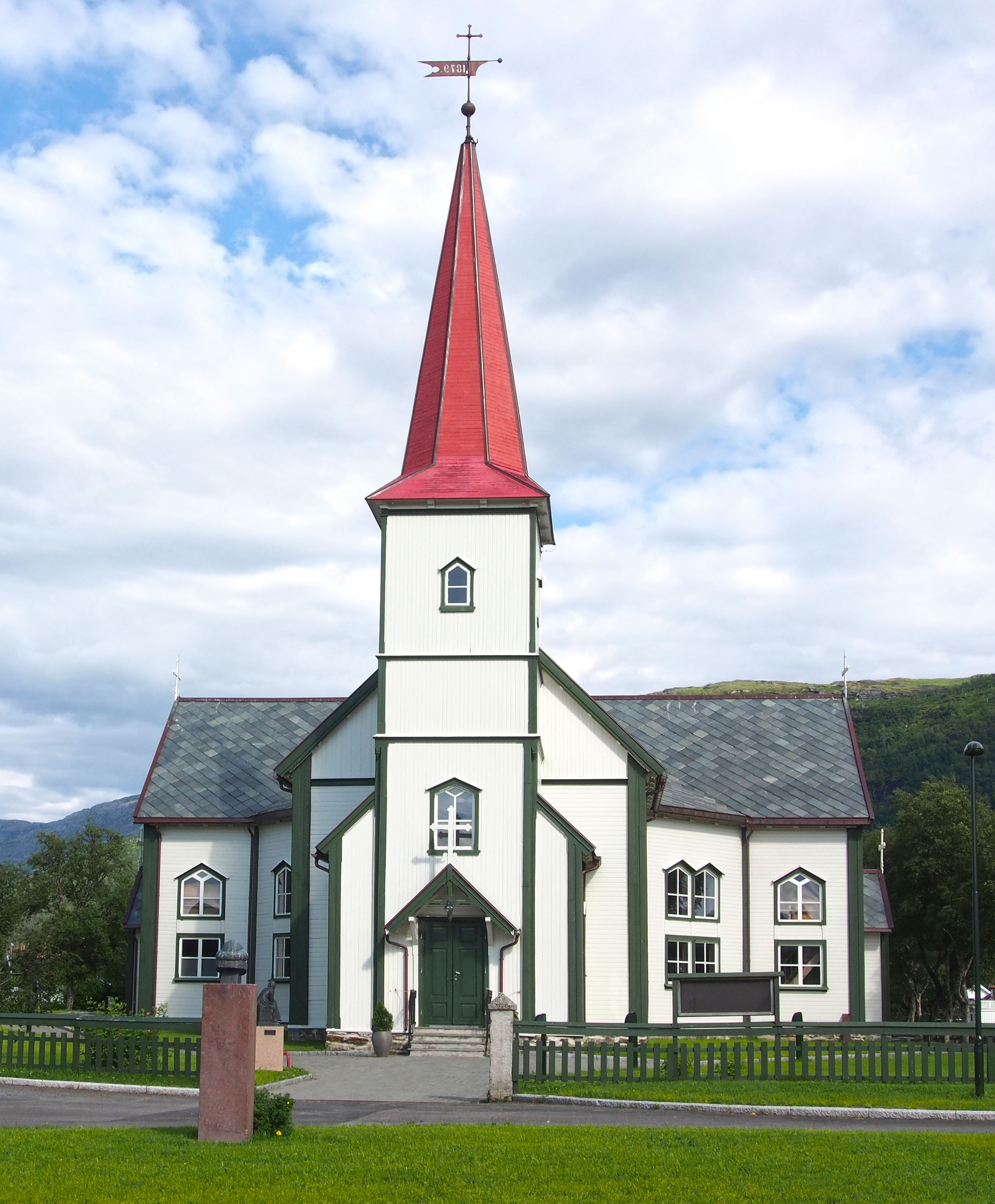

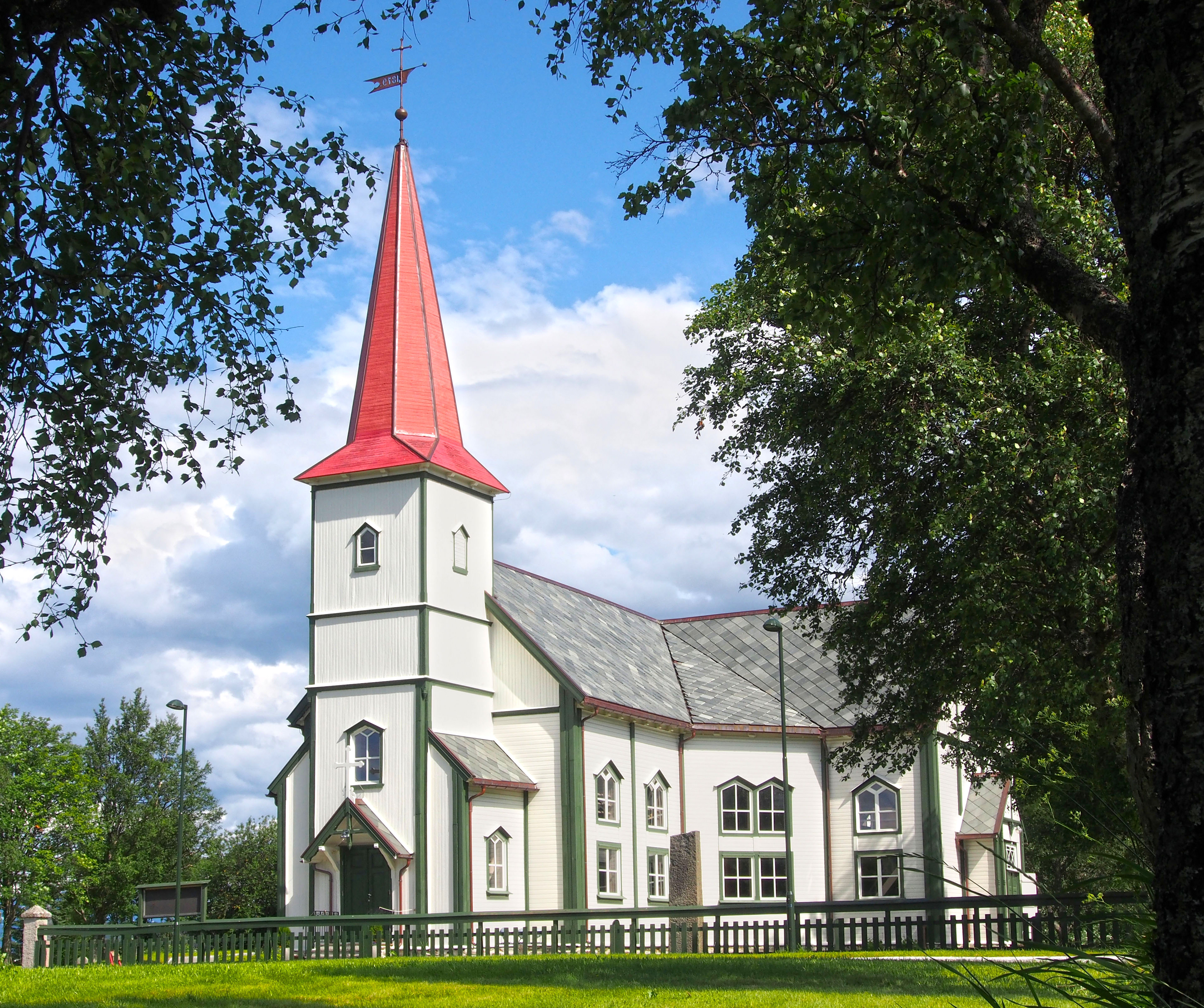

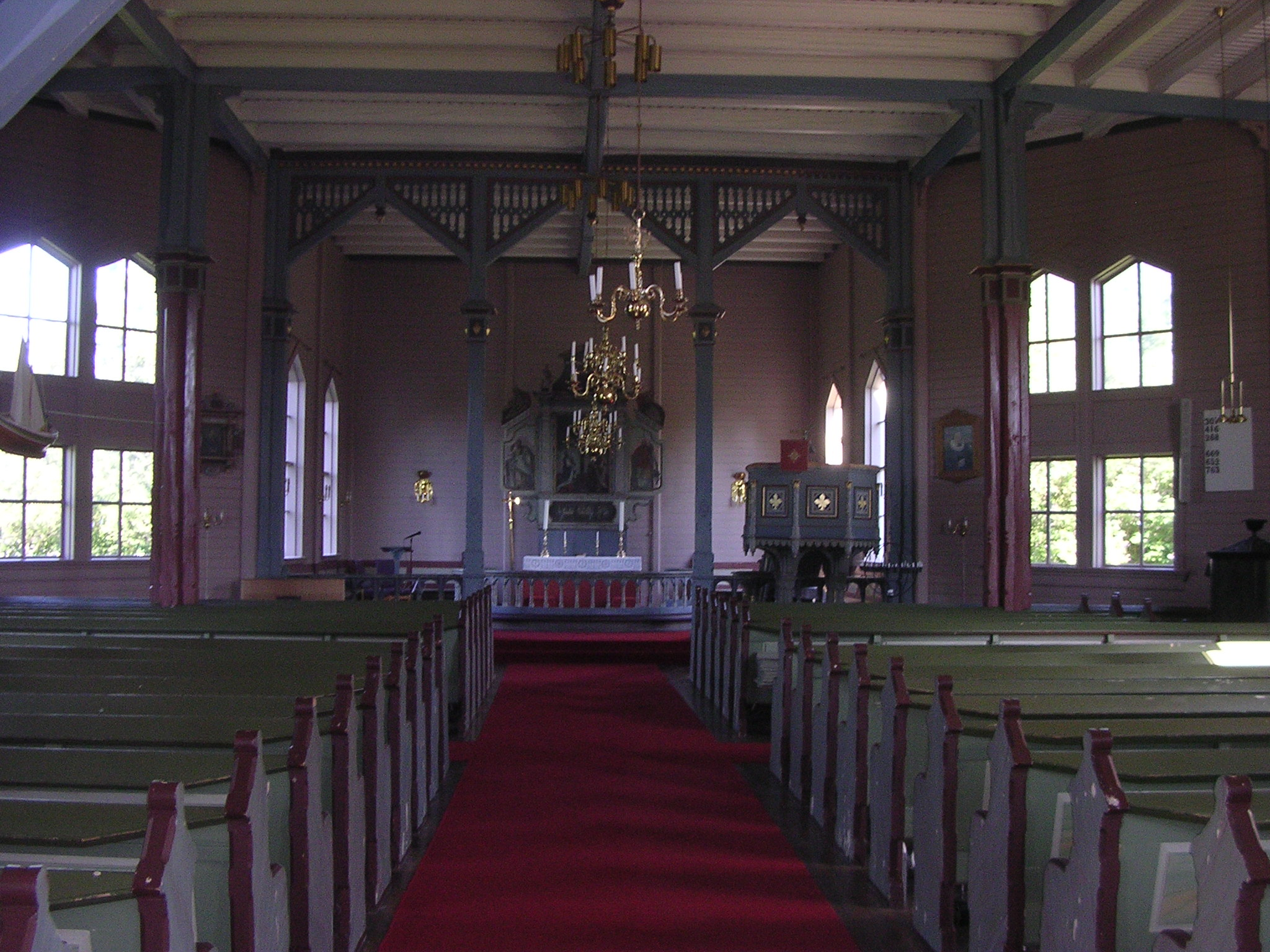

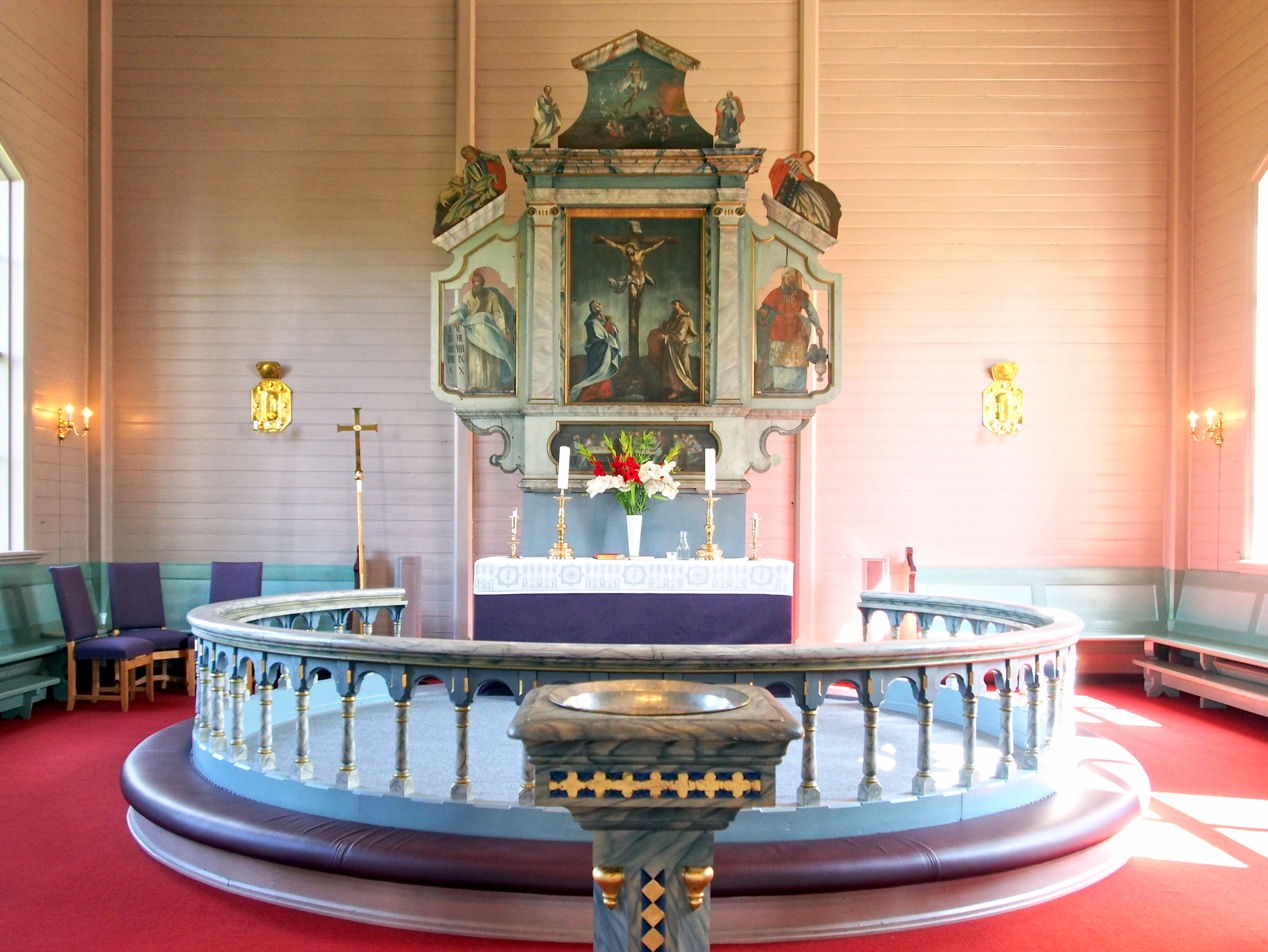

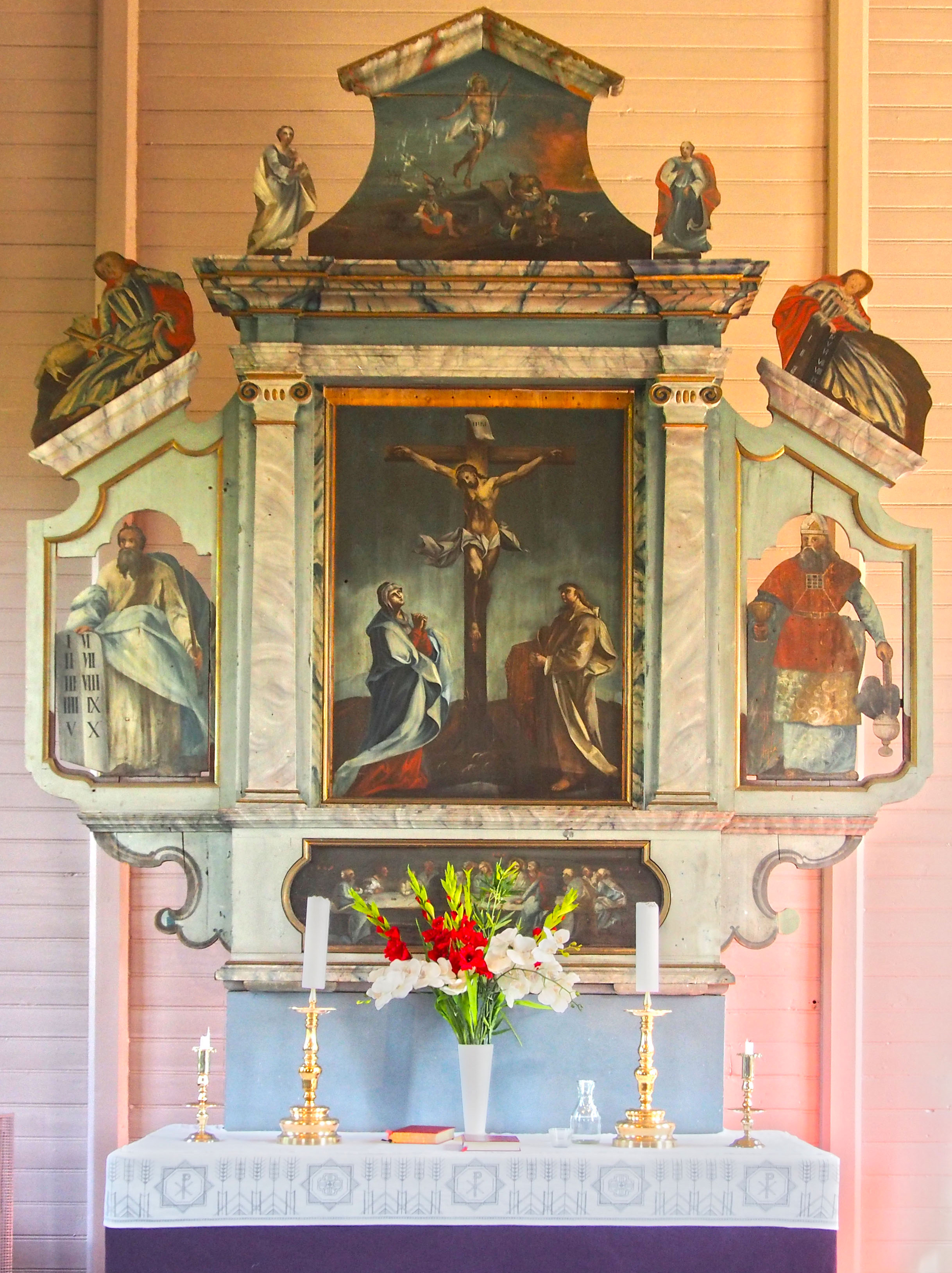

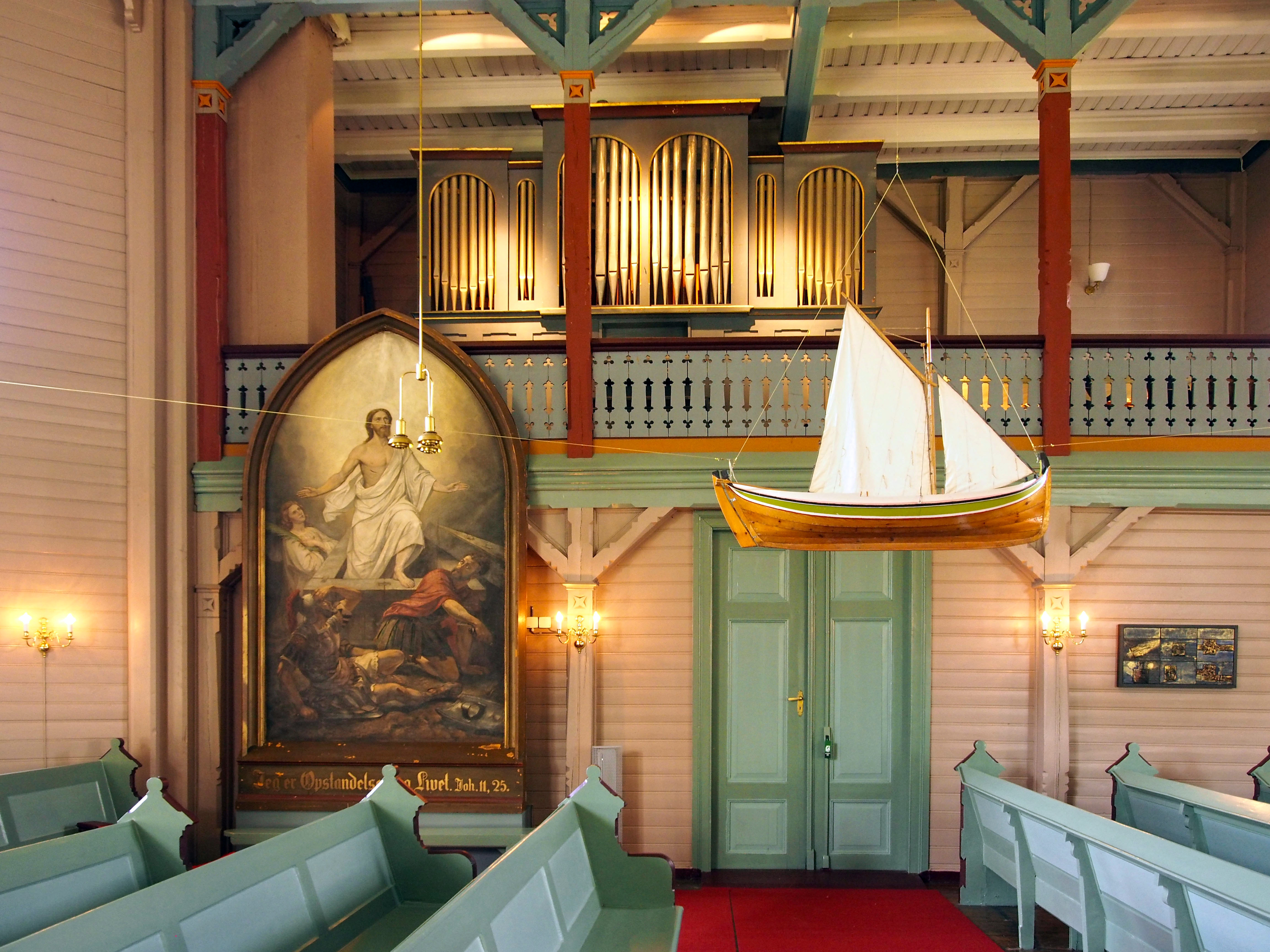

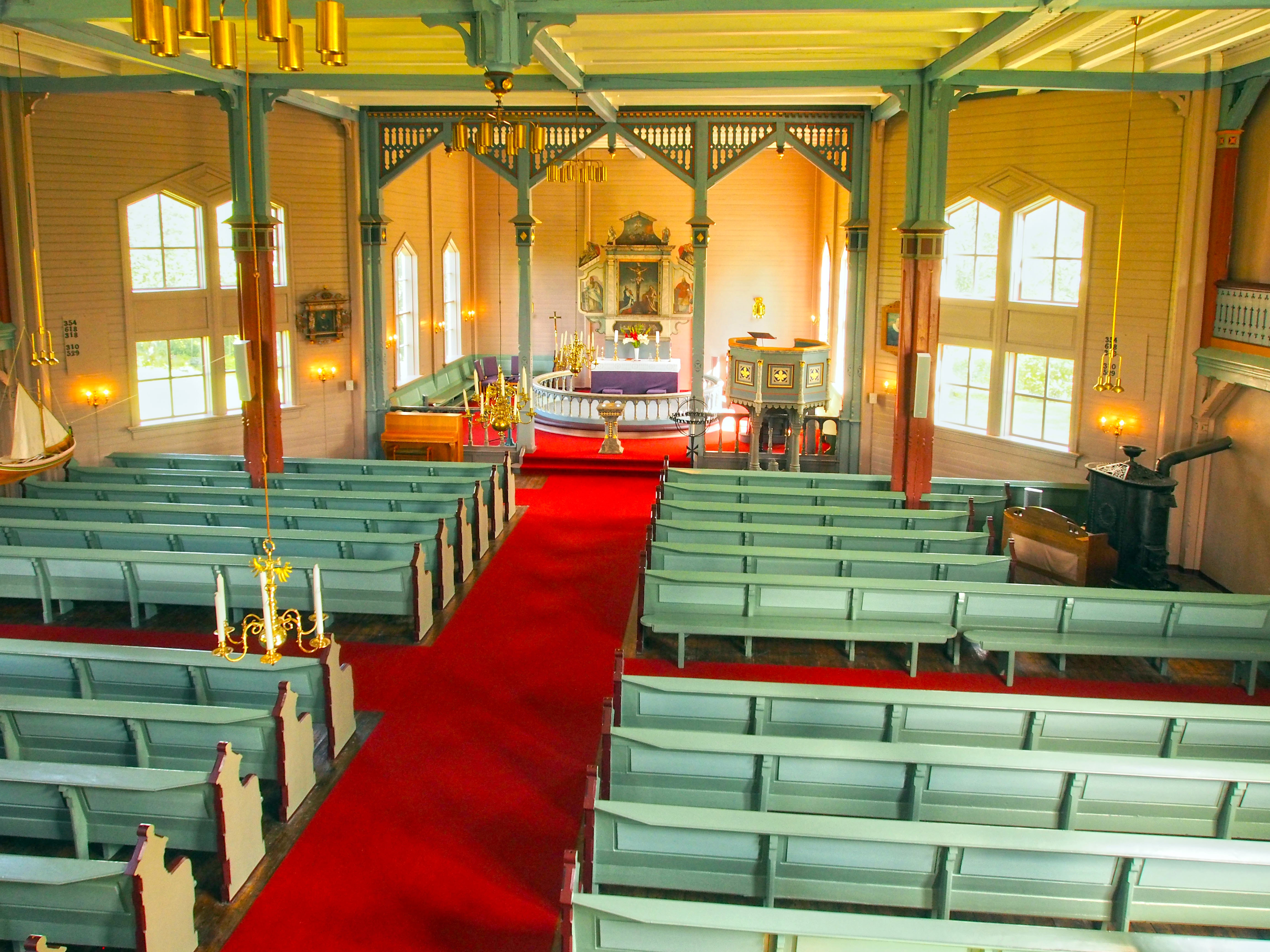

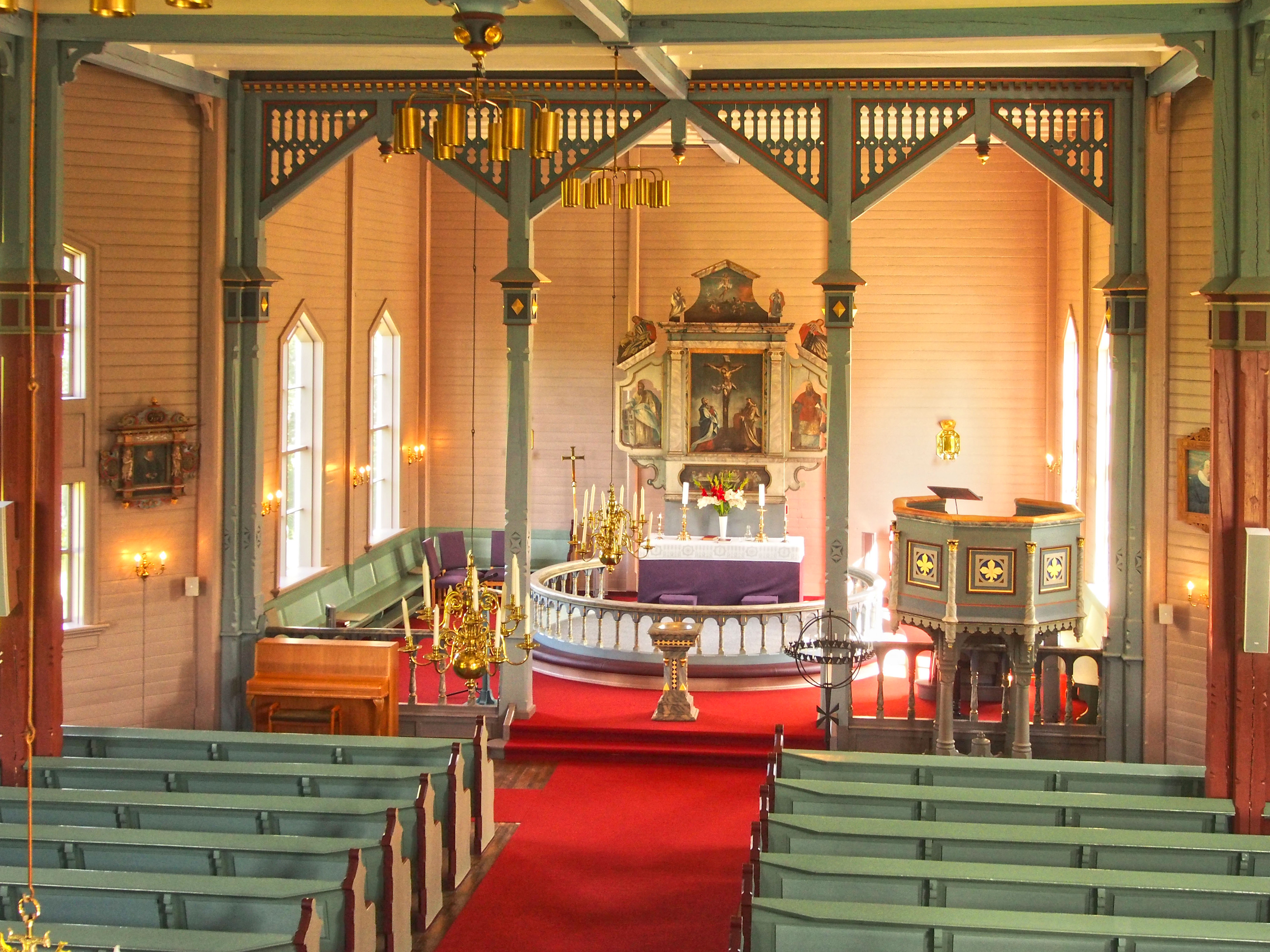
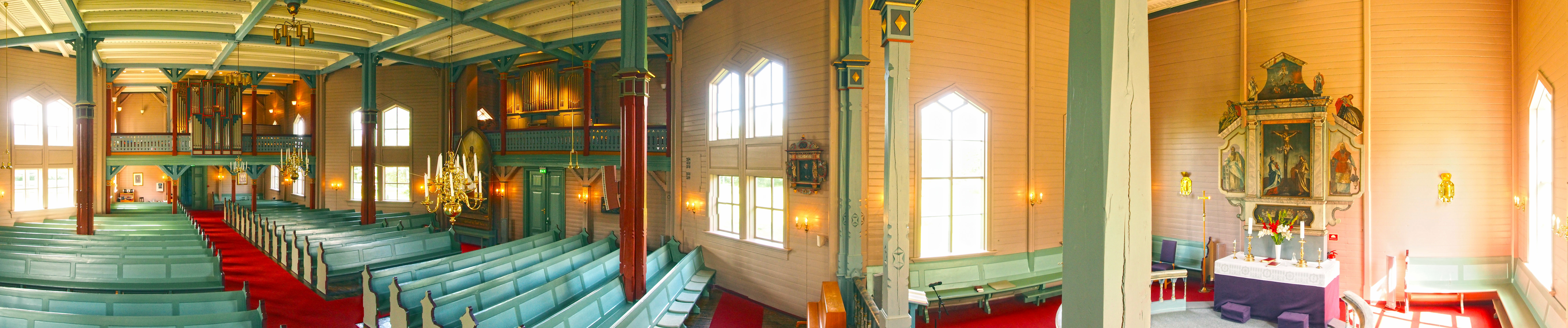

== See also ==
- List of churches in Sør-Hålogaland
