= Nesna Municipality =

Municipality in Nordland, Norway

Nesna Municipality Nesna kommune Neässná
- Municipality
- Nesne herred (historic name)
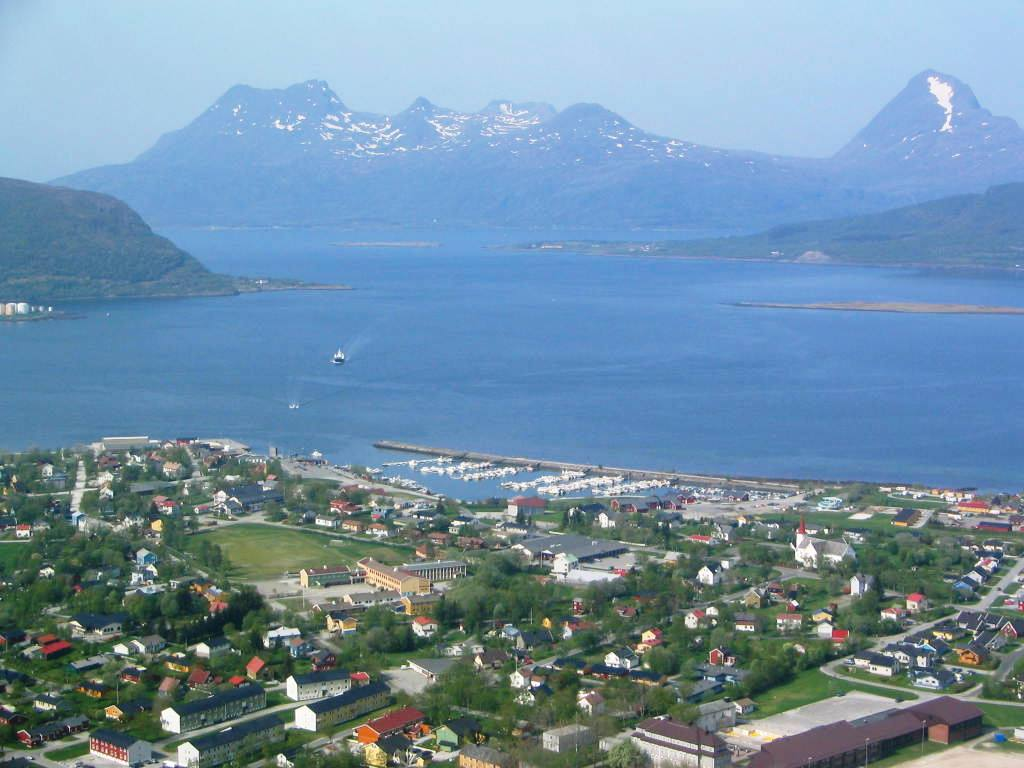
- View of the Nesna peninsula (front), Tomma (middle), Handnesøya (right), Hugla (left)

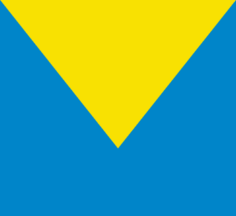
- Flag Coat of arms

- Nordland within Norway

- Nesna within Nordland
- Coordinates: 66°15′28″N 13°02′06″E
- Country: Norway
- County: Nordland
- District: Helgeland
- Established: 1 January 1838
  - Created as: Formannskapsdistrikt
- Administrative centre: Nesna

Government
  - Mayor (2015): Hanne Davidsen (Ap)

Area
  - Total: 183.19 km^{2} (70.73 sq mi)
  - Land: 181.30 km^{2} (70.00 sq mi)
  - Water: 1.89 km^{2} (0.73 sq mi) 1%
  - Rank: #310 in Norway
- Highest elevation: 921.75 m (3,024.1 ft)

Population (2024)
  - Total: 1,808
  - Rank: #294 in Norway
  - Density: 9.9/km^{2} (26/sq mi)
  - Change (10 years): ▼ −4.9%
- Demonym: Nesnaværing

Official language
  - Norwegian form: Bokmål
- Time zone: UTC+01:00 (CET)
  - Summer (DST): UTC+02:00 (CEST)
- ISO 3166 code: NO-1828
- Website: Official website

Nesna is a municipality in Nordland county, Norway. It is part of the Helgeland traditional region. The administrative centre of the municipality is the village of Nesna. Other villages in Nesna include Handnesneset, Husby, Saura, and Vikholmen.

Map of Nesna municipality

The municipality consists of the three main islands Tomma, Hugla (known as "Hugløy" by its inhabitants), and Handnesøya, and one peninsula that bears the name of the municipality, Nesna. The old Husby Estate is headquartered in Husby on Tomma island.

The Coastal Express arrives two times a day at the village of Nesna, the northbound arrives 05:30 and the southbound 11:15. The village of Nesna is also home to the Nesna campus of Nord University, and there is also the KVN High School, and Nesna Church.

The 183.2-square-kilometre (70.7 sq mi) municipality is the 310th largest by area out of the 357 municipalities in Norway. Nesna Municipality is the 294th most populous municipality in Norway with a population of 1,808. The municipality's population density is 9.9 inhabitants per square kilometre (26/sq mi) and its population has decreased by 4.9% over the previous 10-year period.

== General information ==
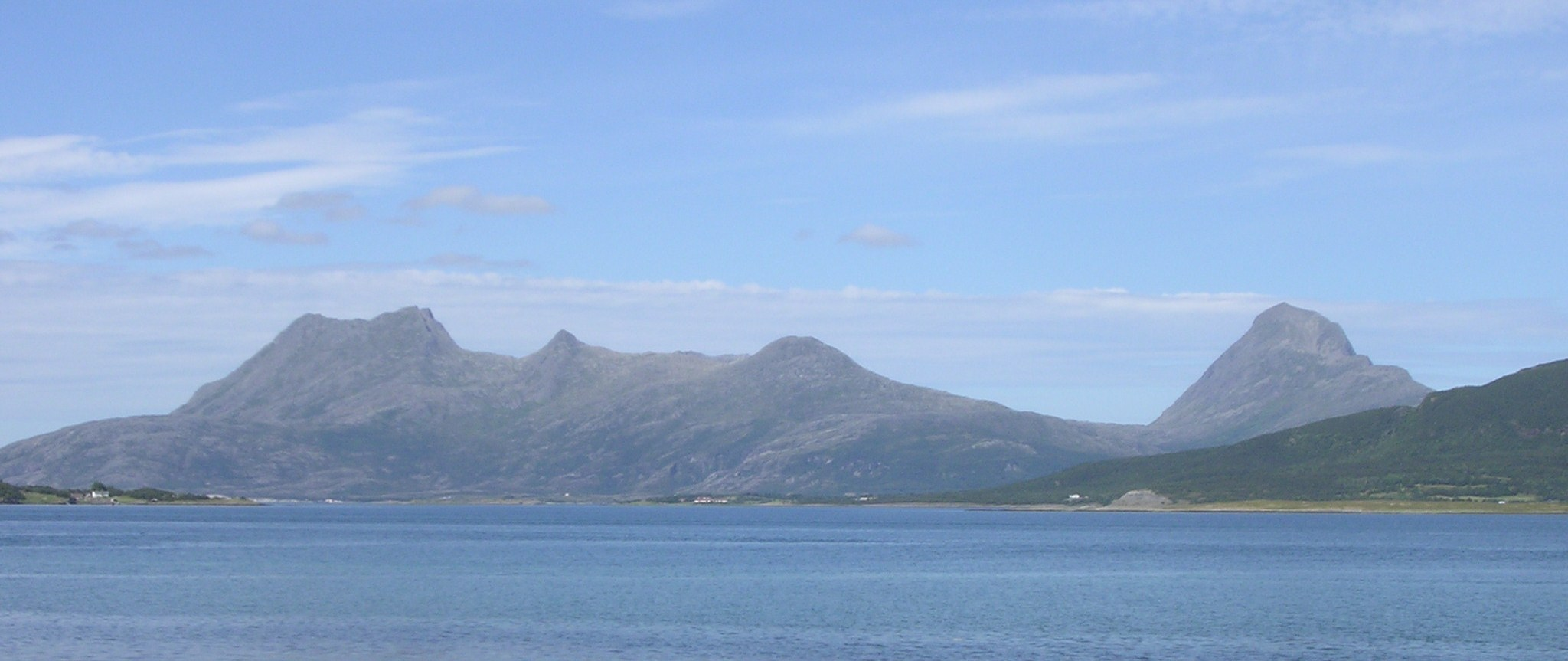
View of the island of Tomma

Nesna was established as a municipality on 1 January 1838 (see formannskapsdistrikt law). The western island district of Nesna Municipality (population: 1,348) was separated from Nesna Municipality on 1 July 1888 to form the new Dønnes Municipality. This left Nesna Municipality with 2,958 residents. On 1 January 1919, the Bardalssjøen farm (population: 4) was transferred from Hemnes Municipality to Nesna Municipality. In 1945, a small area of southern Nesna Municipality (population: 26) was transferred to Leirfjord Municipality.

During the 1960s, there were many municipal mergers across Norway due to the work of the Schei Committee. On 1 January 1962, the part of the island of Løkta (population: 80) belonging to Nesna Municipality was transferred to the new Dønna Municipality. The part of the island of Tomma (population: 80) belonging to Dønnes Municipality was transferred to Nesna Municipality. Then on 1 January 1964, the Bardalssjøen area of Nesna Municipality (located south of the Ranfjorden), was transferred to Leirfjord Municipality. On that same date, the part of Nesna around the inner part of the Sjona fjord was transferred to Rana Municipality.

=== Name ===
The municipality (originally the parish) is named after the old Nesna farm (Old Norse: Nesnar) since the first Nesna Church was built there. The name is derived from the word nes which means "headland". Historically, the name of the municipality was spelled Nesne. On 6 January 1908, a royal resolution changed the spelling of the name of the municipality to Nesna.

=== Coat of arms ===
The coat of arms was granted on 23 June 1989. The official blazon is "Per chevron inverted Or and Azure" (Norwegian: Delt av gull og blått ved omvendt sparresnitt). This means the arms have a field (background) that is divided by a line in the form of an inverted chevron pattern. The background above the line has a tincture of Or which means it is commonly colored yellow, but if it is made out of metal, then gold is used. The background below the line has a tincture of azure. The arms are a canting of the name of the municipality (Nesna comes form nes which means headland in Norwegian). The arms show a yellow-colored "headland" or peninsula surrounded by blue water. The arms were designed by Jarle E. Henriksen.

=== Churches ===
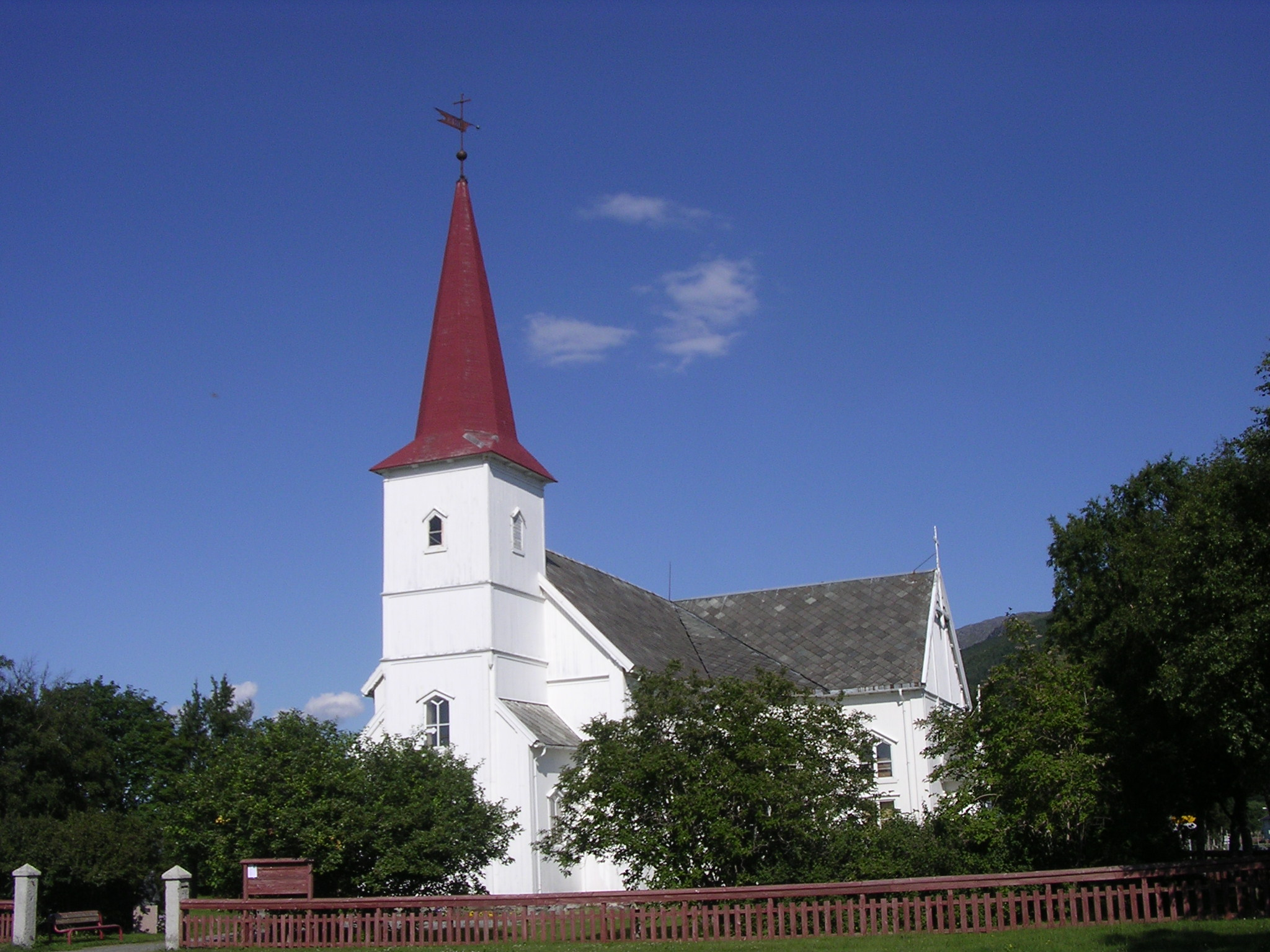
Nesna Church

The Church of Norway has one parish (sokn) within Nesna Municipality. It is part of the Nord-Helgeland prosti (deanery) in the Diocese of Sør-Hålogaland.

Churches in Nesna Municipality
Parish (sokn)	Church name	Location of the church	Year built
Nesna	Nesna Church	Nesna	1880
Nesna	Handnesøya Chapel	Saura	1969
Nesna	Husby Chapel	Husby	1905

== Government ==
Nesna Municipality is responsible for primary education (through 10th grade), outpatient health services, senior citizen services, welfare and other social services, zoning, economic development, and municipal roads and utilities. The municipality is governed by a municipal council of directly elected representatives. The mayor is indirectly elected by a vote of the municipal council. The municipality is under the jurisdiction of the Helgeland District Court and the Hålogaland Court of Appeal.

=== Municipal council ===
The municipal council (Kommunestyre) of Nesna Municipality is made up of 17 representatives that are elected to four-year terms. The tables below show the current and historical composition of the council by political party.

Nesna kommunestyre 2023–2027
Party name (in Norwegian)	Number of representatives
Labour Party (Arbeiderpartiet)	7
Progress Party (Fremskrittspartiet)	1
Centre Party (Senterpartiet)	3
Socialist Left Party (Sosialistisk Venstreparti)	3
Joint List(s) of Non-Socialist Parties (Borgerlige Felleslister)	3
Total number of members:	17

Nesna kommunestyre 2019–2023
Party name (in Norwegian)	Number of representatives
Labour Party (Arbeiderpartiet)	7
Green Party (Miljøpartiet De Grønne)	1
Centre Party (Senterpartiet)	4
Socialist Left Party (Sosialistisk Venstreparti)	2
Joint List(s) of Non-Socialist Parties (Borgerlige Felleslister)	3
Total number of members:	17

Nesna kommunestyre 2015–2019
Party name (in Norwegian)	Number of representatives
Labour Party (Arbeiderpartiet)	7
Green Party (Miljøpartiet De Grønne)	1
Conservative Party (Høyre)	3
Centre Party (Senterpartiet)	3
Socialist Left Party (Sosialistisk Venstreparti)	3
Total number of members:	17

Nesna kommunestyre 2011–2015
Party name (in Norwegian)	Number of representatives
Labour Party (Arbeiderpartiet)	4
Progress Party (Fremskrittspartiet)	2
Conservative Party (Høyre)	5
Centre Party (Senterpartiet)	3
Socialist Left Party (Sosialistisk Venstreparti)	2
Liberal Party (Venstre)	1
Total number of members:	17

Nesna kommunestyre 2007–2011
Party name (in Norwegian)	Number of representatives
Labour Party (Arbeiderpartiet)	4
Progress Party (Fremskrittspartiet)	3
Conservative Party (Høyre)	2
Centre Party (Senterpartiet)	3
Socialist Left Party (Sosialistisk Venstreparti)	3
Liberal Party (Venstre)	2
Total number of members:	17

Nesna kommunestyre 2003–2007
Party name (in Norwegian)	Number of representatives
Labour Party (Arbeiderpartiet)	4
Progress Party (Fremskrittspartiet)	5
Conservative Party (Høyre)	2
Centre Party (Senterpartiet)	2
Socialist Left Party (Sosialistisk Venstreparti)	3
Liberal Party (Venstre)	1
Total number of members:	17

Nesna kommunestyre 1999–2003
Party name (in Norwegian)	Number of representatives
Labour Party (Arbeiderpartiet)	7
Conservative Party (Høyre)	3
Centre Party (Senterpartiet)	3
Socialist Left Party (Sosialistisk Venstreparti)	2
Liberal Party (Venstre)	2
Total number of members:	17

Nesna kommunestyre 1995–1999
Party name (in Norwegian)	Number of representatives
Labour Party (Arbeiderpartiet)	4
Conservative Party (Høyre)	2
Centre Party (Senterpartiet)	4
Socialist Left Party (Sosialistisk Venstreparti)	2
Liberal Party (Venstre)	2
Cooperative list for Nesna (Samarbeidslista for Nesna)	3
Total number of members:	17

Nesna kommunestyre 1991–1995
Party name (in Norwegian)	Number of representatives
Labour Party (Arbeiderpartiet)	7
Conservative Party (Høyre)	2
Centre Party (Senterpartiet)	4
Socialist Left Party (Sosialistisk Venstreparti)	3
Liberal Party (Venstre)	1
Total number of members:	17

Nesna kommunestyre 1987–1991
Party name (in Norwegian)	Number of representatives
Labour Party (Arbeiderpartiet)	9
Conservative Party (Høyre)	3
Centre Party (Senterpartiet)	3
Socialist Left Party (Sosialistisk Venstreparti)	1
Liberal Party (Venstre)	1
Total number of members:	17

Nesna kommunestyre 1983–1987
Party name (in Norwegian)	Number of representatives
Labour Party (Arbeiderpartiet)	7
Conservative Party (Høyre)	5
Christian Democratic Party (Kristelig Folkeparti)	1
Socialist Left Party (Sosialistisk Venstreparti)	1
Joint list of the Centre Party (Senterpartiet) and the Liberal Party (Venstre)	3
Total number of members:	17

Nesna kommunestyre 1979–1983
Party name (in Norwegian)	Number of representatives
Labour Party (Arbeiderpartiet)	6
Conservative Party (Høyre)	4
Christian Democratic Party (Kristelig Folkeparti)	1
Socialist Left Party (Sosialistisk Venstreparti)	1
Joint list of the Centre Party (Senterpartiet) and the Liberal Party (Venstre)	4
Election list for the Tomma area (Valgliste for Tomma krets)	1
Total number of members:	17

Nesna kommunestyre 1975–1979
Party name (in Norwegian)	Number of representatives
Labour Party (Arbeiderpartiet)	6
Christian Democratic Party (Kristelig Folkeparti)	1
Centre Party (Senterpartiet)	2
Socialist Left Party (Sosialistisk Venstreparti)	1
Joint list of independent voters, the Conservative Party, and the Liberal Party (Samarbeidsliste av Uavhengige Velgere, Høyre og Venstre)	5
Election list for the Tomma area (Valgliste for Tomma krets)	2
Total number of members:	17

Nesna kommunestyre 1971–1975
Party name (in Norwegian)	Number of representatives
Labour Party (Arbeiderpartiet)	7
Christian Democratic Party (Kristelig Folkeparti)	1
Centre Party (Senterpartiet)	2
Liberal Party (Venstre)	1
Local List(s) (Lokale lister)	6
Total number of members:	17

Nesna kommunestyre 1967–1971
Party name (in Norwegian)	Number of representatives
Labour Party (Arbeiderpartiet)	9
Conservative Party (Høyre)	1
Christian Democratic Party (Kristelig Folkeparti)	1
Centre Party (Senterpartiet)	3
Liberal Party (Venstre)	2
Local List(s) (Lokale lister)	1
Total number of members:	17

Nesna kommunestyre 1963–1967
Party name (in Norwegian)	Number of representatives
Labour Party (Arbeiderpartiet)	9
Conservative Party (Høyre)	2
Centre Party (Senterpartiet)	4
Liberal Party (Venstre)	1
Local List(s) (Lokale lister)	1
Total number of members:	17

Nesna herredsstyre 1959–1963
Party name (in Norwegian)	Number of representatives
Labour Party (Arbeiderpartiet)	9
Conservative Party (Høyre)	3
Centre Party (Senterpartiet)	5
Liberal Party (Venstre)	2
Local List(s) (Lokale lister)	2
Total number of members:	21

Nesna herredsstyre 1955–1959
Party name (in Norwegian)	Number of representatives
Labour Party (Arbeiderpartiet)	10
List of workers, fishermen, and small farmholders (Arbeidere, fiskere, småbrukere liste)	2
Joint List(s) of Non-Socialist Parties (Borgerlige Felleslister)	9
Total number of members:	21

Nesna herredsstyre 1951–1955
Party name (in Norwegian)	Number of representatives
Labour Party (Arbeiderpartiet)	11
Joint List(s) of Non-Socialist Parties (Borgerlige Felleslister)	10
Total number of members:	21

Nesna herredsstyre 1947–1951
Party name (in Norwegian)	Number of representatives
Labour Party (Arbeiderpartiet)	13
Joint List(s) of Non-Socialist Parties (Borgerlige Felleslister)	7
Local List(s) (Lokale lister)	1
Total number of members:	21

Nesna herredsstyre 1945–1947
Party name (in Norwegian)	Number of representatives
Labour Party (Arbeiderpartiet)	14
Local List(s) (Lokale lister)	7
Total number of members:	21

Nesna herredsstyre 1937–1941*
Party name (in Norwegian)	Number of representatives
Labour Party (Arbeiderpartiet)	5
List of workers, fishermen, and small farmholders (Arbeidere, fiskere, småbrukere liste)	1
Joint List(s) of Non-Socialist Parties (Borgerlige Felleslister)	6
Local List(s) (Lokale lister)	4
Total number of members:	16
Note: Due to the German occupation of Norway during World War II, no elections were held for new municipal councils until after the war ended in 1945.

=== Mayors ===
The mayor (Norwegian: ordfører) of Nesna Municipality is the political leader of the municipality and the chairperson of the municipal council. Here is a list of people who have held this position:

- 1838–1848: Johan Augustinussen
- 1848–1850: Fredrik Christian Sand
- 1850–1854: Johan Augustinussen
- 1854–1867: Elias Olsen
- 1867–1876: Jacob Fredrik Zahl
- 1877–1880: Elias Olsen
- 1881–1890: Carl Jøsevold
- 1891–1894: Jakob Beck
- 1894–1896: Lorents Pettersen
- 1896–1898: Christian F. Olsen
- 1899–1907: Carl Jøsevold
- 1908–1914: Nils Haugen
- 1915–1918: Anders Pettersen
- 1919–1922: Møller Zahl Hauknes
- 1922–1925: Ivar Hjellvik
- 1926–1928: Laurits Riise
- 1929–1942: Arne Langset (V)
- 1943–1945: Anders Forsland
- 1945–1945: Arne Langset (V)
- 1946–1952: Johan Knutsen (Ap)
- 1952–1956: Einar Enga (Ap)
- 1956–1957: Olaus Berg (H)
- 1958–1964: Edvard Kaspersen (Ap)
- 1964–1964: Henry Antonsen (Ap)
- 1964–1965: Håkon Langseth (Sp)
- 1966–1967: Leander Paulsen (Ap)
- 1968–1971: Arne Herseth (Ap)
- 1972–1973: Edvard Kaspersen (LL)
- 1974–1975: Arne Herseth (Ap)
- 1976–1981: Mathias Sellæg Moe (V)
- 1982–1983: Kåre Eriksen (H)
- 1984–1985: Ole A. Selseth (V)
- 1986–1987: Arne Herseth (Ap)
- 1988–1991: Øyvind Jenssen (Ap)
- 1991–1995: Anne-Lise Wold (Ap)
- 1996–1999: Gunnhild Forsland (Sp)
- 1999–2007: Anne-Lise Wold (Ap)
- 2007–2011: Ronny Sommerro (Ap)
- 2011–2015: Marit Bye (H)
- 2015–present: Hanne Davidsen (Ap)

== Geography ==
The highest point in the municipality is the 921.75-metre (3,024.1 ft) tall mountain Tommskjevelen. Nesna is located west of Rana Municipality, north of Leirfjord Municipality (across the Ranfjorden), east of Dønna Municipality (an island municipality), and south of Lurøy Municipality.

=== Farms of Nesna ===
Historically, the land of Nesna was divided up into named farms. These farms were used in census and tax records and are useful for genealogical research.

Nesna municipality, tellingskrets 1-3, 6-7, from 1920 census
Tellingskrets (enumeration districts): 1, Tomøy (lime); 2, Hannesøy (red); 3, Hugløya og Horn (blue); 6, Nesnastranden (purple); 7, Nesna og Strandlandet (black). List of farms:
1 1: Finvik
2 2: Sellåt
3 3: Forsland
4 4: Skjeivstad
5 5: Alsøy
6 6: Nordstrand
7 7: Valla
8 8: Hansteen
9 9: Hagen
10 10: Ravnfløi
11 11: Skaganeset
12 12: Øbo
13 13: Fjelstad
14 14: Steiro
15 15: Stokka
16 16: Hines
17 17: Riksen
18 18: Saura
19 19: Dilleren
20 20: Svaleng
21 21: Huglen
22 22: Horn
23 23: Halland
24 24: Feøy
25 25: Nordbostad
26 26: Vik
27 46: Einmo
28 47: Langseth
29 48: Engen
30 49: Remmen
31 50: Skog
32 51: Remmaa
33 52: Oldersletten
34 53: Huske
35 54: Herseth
36 55: Handaa
37 56: Sletstrand
38 57: Nesna
39 58: Utsyn
40 59: Sandnes
41 60: Strandheim
42 61: Strand øvre
43 62: Mehus
44 63: Hammerø
45 64: Hinderå
47 Handnesøya kirke (church), built 1921, consecrated 1969
48 Husby kapell (chapel), built 1905
49 Nesna kirke (church), built 1880

==== Map of the farms ====
Note that each map has a maximum number of listings it can display, so the map has been divided into parts consistent with the enumeration districts (Norwegian: tellingskrets) in the 1920 census. This map includes one farm name per farm number; other farm names or subdivision numbers may exist. (Note: The historical tellingskrets 4, Nordsjona og Kvalnes, and 5, Myklebostad og Venes, are now part of Vefsn Municipality, while the historical tellingskrets 8, Bardal; 9, Sørlandet; and 10, Lilandet Fagerviken, are now part of Leirfjord Municipality. Parts of the Dønnes municipality were added to Nesna).

==== Farm names and numbers ====
The farms in the Nesna municipality are listed in O. Rygh's series Norske_Gaardnavne ("Norwegian farm names"), the Nordland volume of which was published in 1905.

See also: Digital version of Norske Gaardnavne - Nordland (in Norwegian)

The farm numbers are used in some census records, and numbers that are near each other indicate that those farms are geographically proximate. Handwritten Norwegian sources, particularly those prior to 1800, may use variants on these names. For recorded variants before 1723, see the digital version of O. Rygh. Note that the 1920 census records mapped above may not match O. Rygh.

Farm names were often used as part of Norwegian names, in addition to the person's given name and patronymic or inherited surname. Some families retained the farm name, or toponymic, as a surname when they emigrated, so in those cases tracing a surname may tell you specifically where in Norway the family was from. This tradition began to change in the mid to late 19th century, and inherited surnames were codified into law in 1923.

== Notable people ==
- Johan Augustinussen (born 1808 at Langset - 1888 in Nesna), a curate/choirmaster, teacher, and politician
- Hans Christiansen (1867 in Nesna – 1938), a sailor who competed at the 1912 Summer Olympics
- Birger Fredrik Motzfeldt OBE, CVO (1898 in Nesna – 1987), an aviator and senior military officer
- Ida Maria (born 1984), a musician and singer-songwriter who was born and lives in Nesna
- Emil Weber Meek (born 1988), a professional mixed martial artist who was brought up in Nesna
- Ulrik Berglann (born 1992 in Nesna), a footballer with 180 club caps
