= Ranfjorden =

Fjord in Nordland, Norway

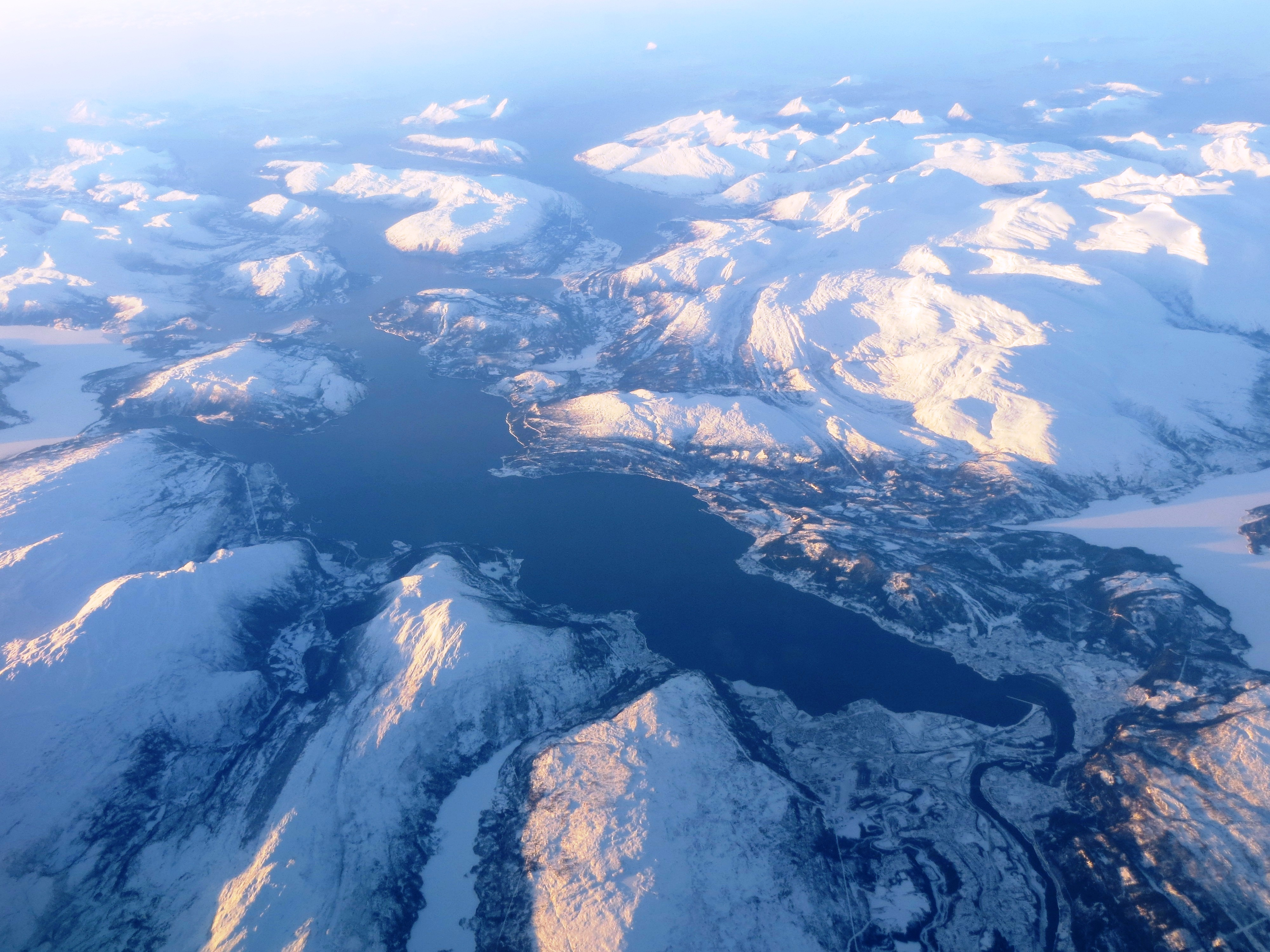
- View of the fjord
- Interactive map of the fjord
- Location: Nordland county, Norway
- Coordinates: 66.1356°N 12.8422°E
- Type: Fjord
- Basin countries: Norway
- Max. length: 68 kilometres (42 mi)
- Max. depth: 525 metres (1,722 ft)

Ranfjorden is a fjord in the Helgeland district of Nordland county, Norway. The largest part of the fjord is in Rana Municipality, but the fjord also passes through the municipalities of Hemnes, Vefsn, Leirfjord, Nesna, and Dønna.

The Ranelva river meets the Ranfjord in at the town of Mo i Rana at the innermost part of the fjord. It then flows to the west for about 68 kilometres (42 mi) to where it meets the sea along the border of Dønna Municipality and Nesna Municipality.

The inner part of the fjord is lush, forested, and more heavily populated. The western parts of the fjord are narrow with steep sides and that area has few inhabitants. There is a narrow strait that connects to the Sørfjorden and Elsfjorden at the village of Hemnesberget. Two large rivers flow into the fjord: Ranelva and Røssåga. The European route E6 highway follows the part of the southern coast of the fjord on its way to Mo i Rana.

== Gallery ==
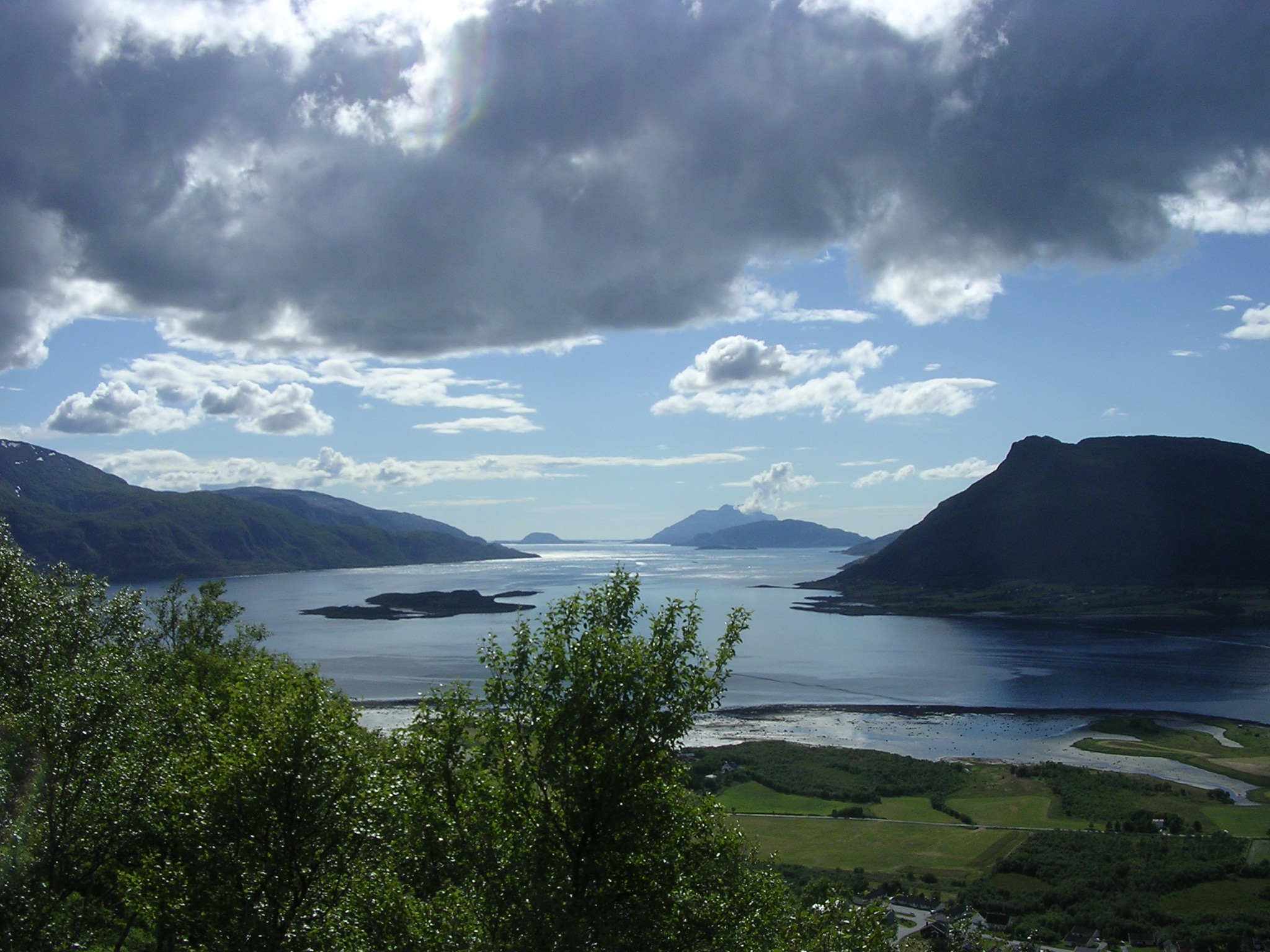
The mouth of Ranfjorden in Nesna Municipality

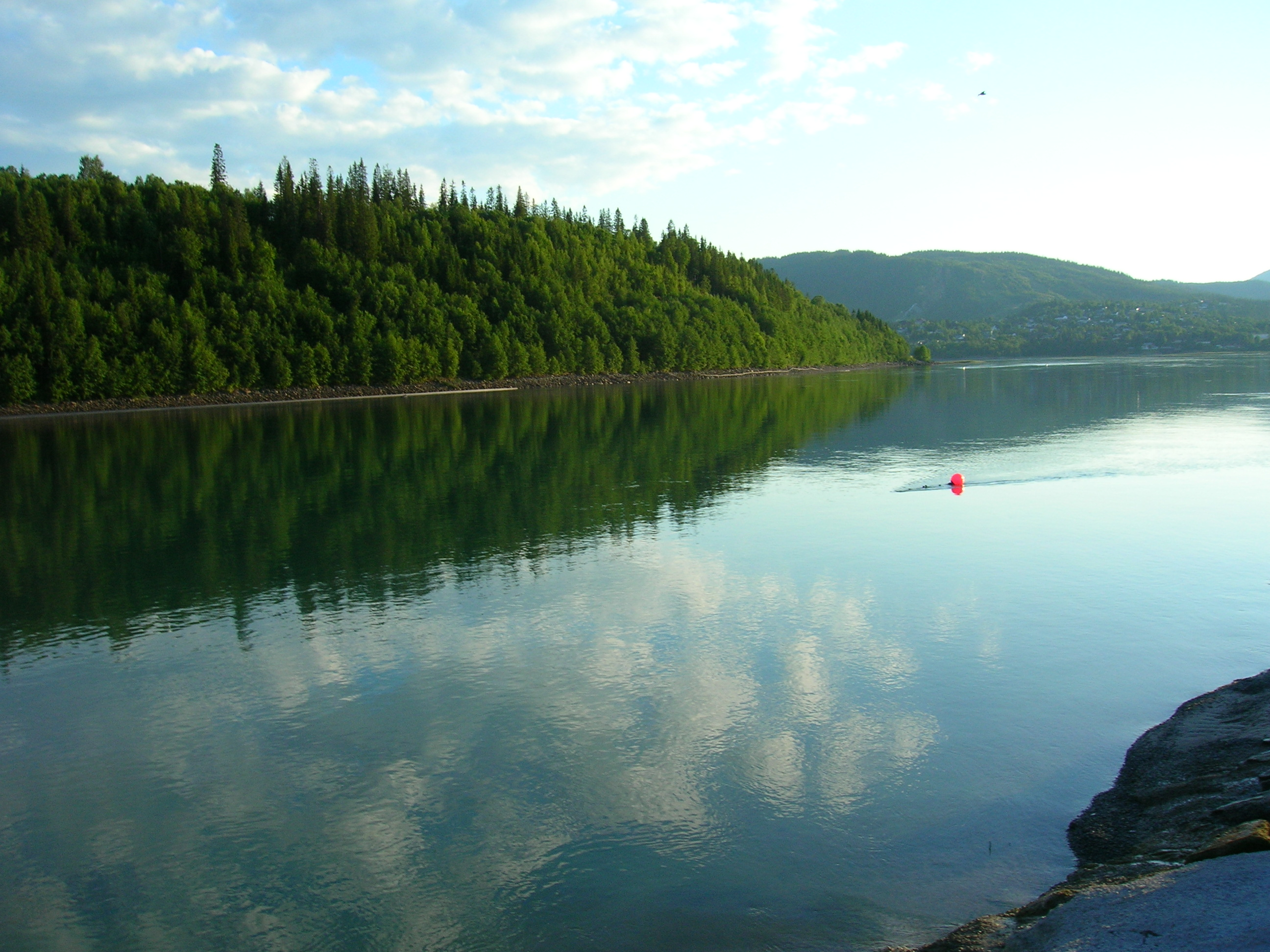
Near Ytteren in Rana

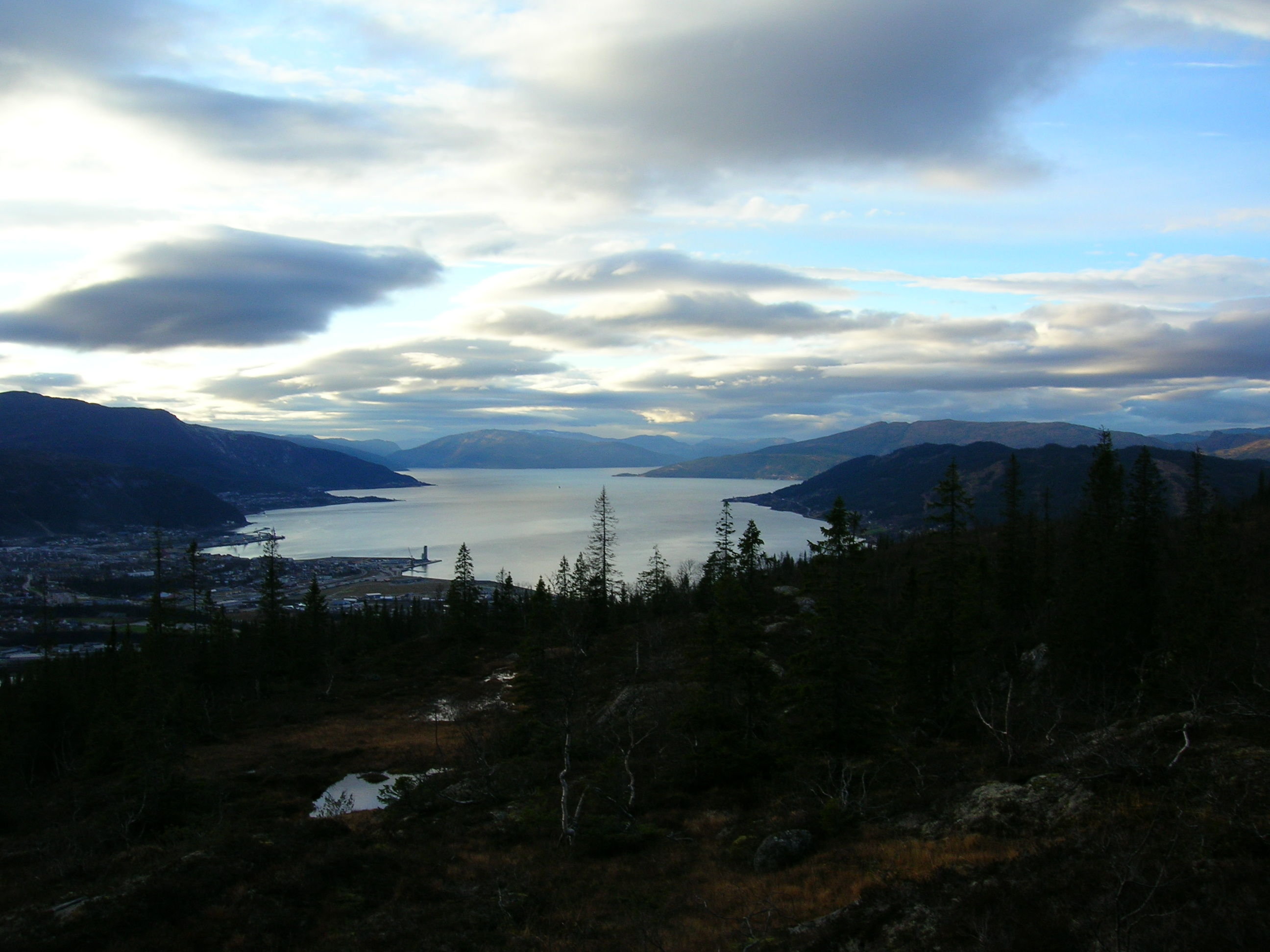
Kvitbergan, with Ranfjorden in the background

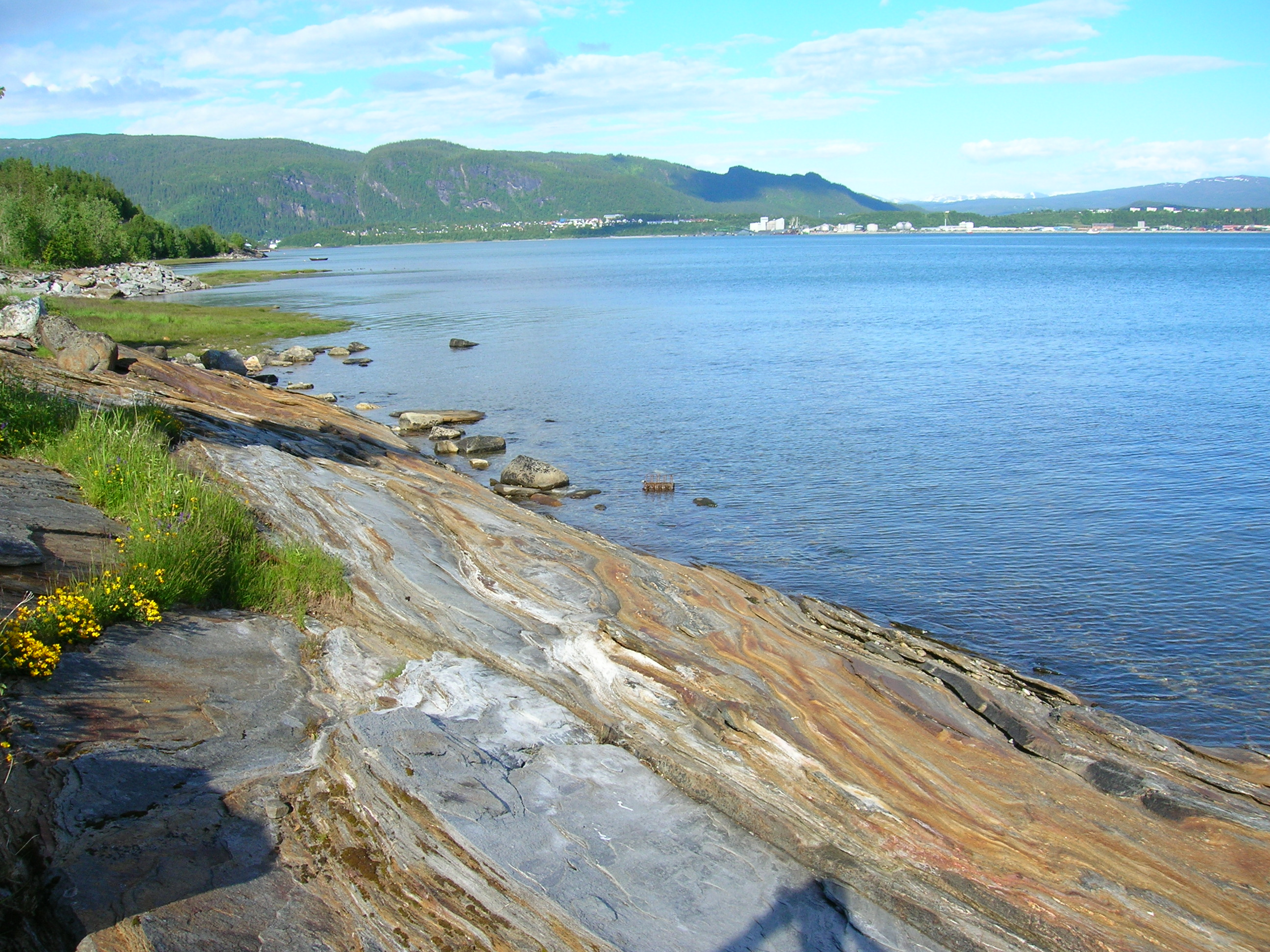
View between Båsmoen and Alteren in Rana

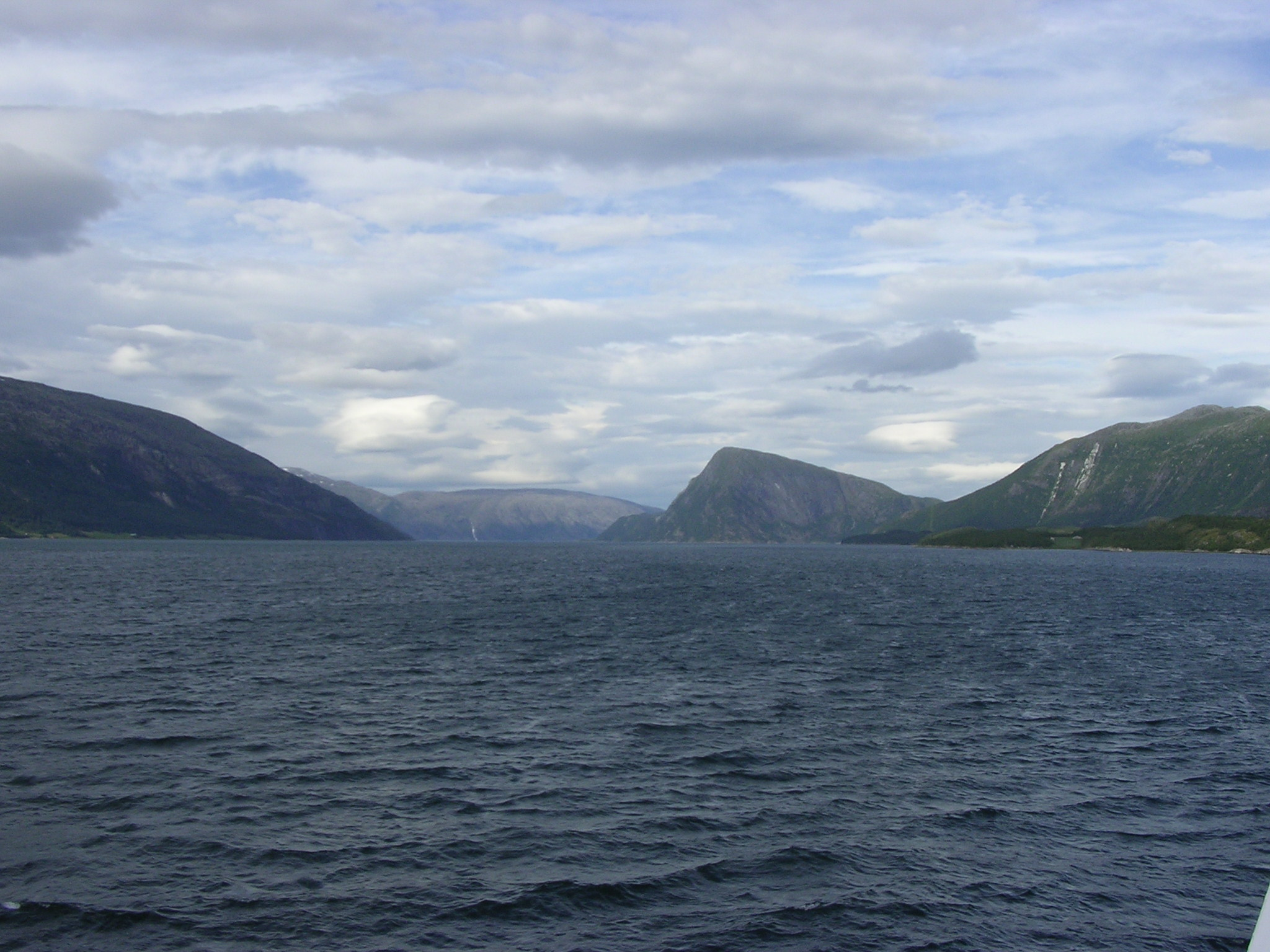
Eastward view into Ranfjorden

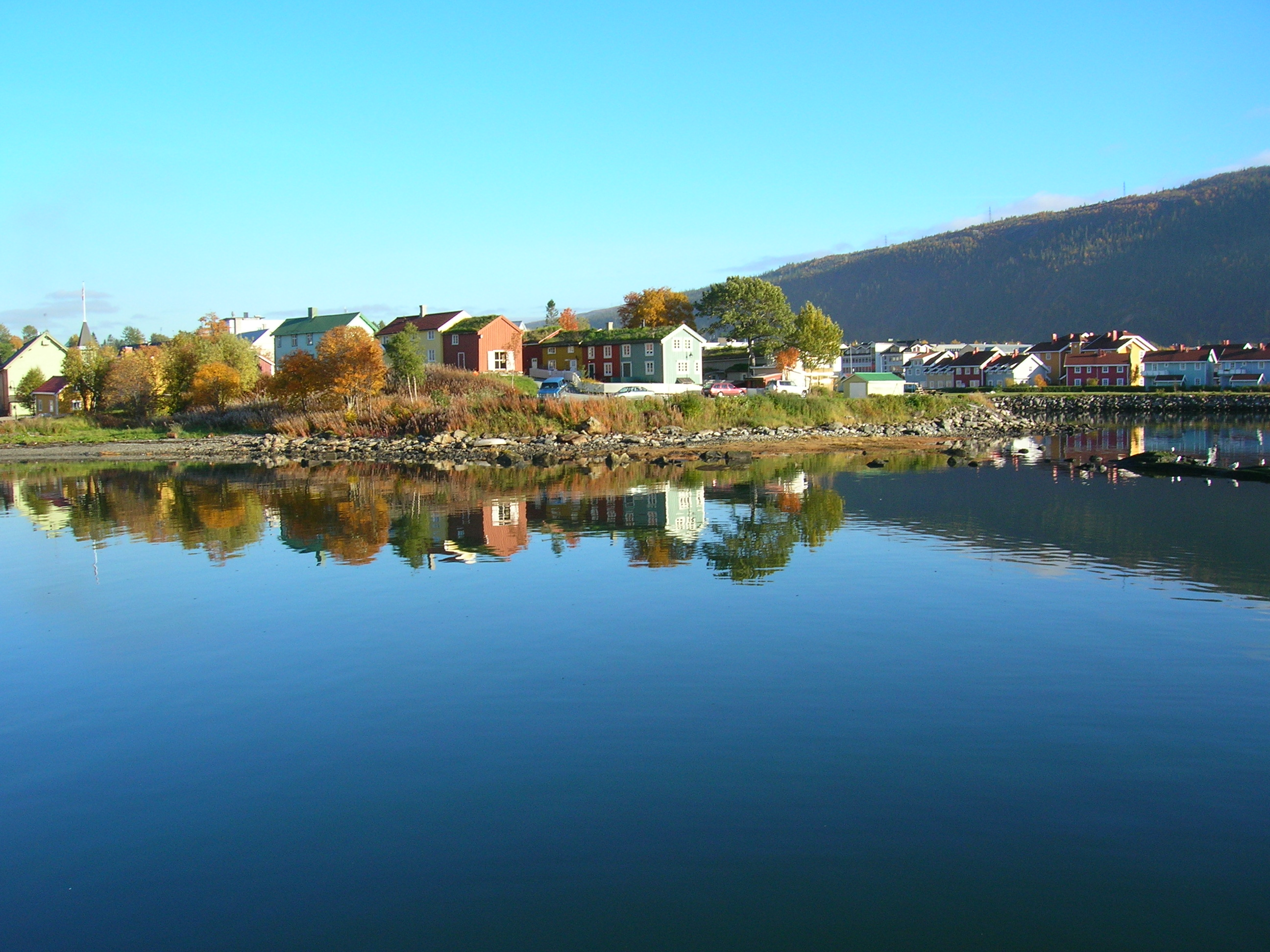
View from Ranfjorden of Moholmen, the oldest part of Mo i Rana.
