= Husebye =

Husebye is a surname. Notable people with the surname include:

- Birgitte Husebye, Norwegian orienteering competitor
- Eystein Husebye (1937–2025), Norwegian seismologist
- Eystein Husebye, Jr. (born 1961), Norwegian endocrinologist, son of the former
- Finn Moestue Husebye (1905–2001), Norwegian priest
- Leif Husebye (1926–2009), Norwegian sailor, sports journalist, and newspaper editor

== See also ==
- Huseby
- Husby
