= Gothus =

Gothus may refer to:

- Gothus (crab), a genus of crabs
- Gothus, the Latinized form of the Germanic name Gaut
- An epithet for people originating from Götaland, including:
  - Laurentius Petri Gothus (died 1579), Archbishop of Uppsala
  - Laurentius Paulinus Gothus (1565–1646), Archbishop of Uppsala
  - Johannes Matthiae Gothus (1592–1670), Bishop of Strängnäs

== See also ==
- Name of the Goths
