= Husby =

Husby may refer to:

== Places ==
=== Denmark ===
- Husby, Denmark, a village in Holstebro Municipality
- Husby, Denmark, a village in Middelfart Municipality

=== Germany ===
- Husby, Germany, a municipality in the Hürup area of Schleswig-Holstein
- Hüsby, a municipality in the Arensharde area of Schleswig-Holstein

=== Norway ===
- Husby, Norway, a village in Nesna, Nordland County
  - Husby Chapel, a chapel in Nesna
- Husby Estate, an old estate in Nesna, Nordland County

=== Sweden ===
- Husby, Stockholm, a district in Stockholm
  - Husby metro station, a metro station in Stockholm
- Husby, Hedemora, district in Hedemora
- Husby (estate), a collection of royal estates in the Uppsala öd of the Swedish King
- Västra Husby, a locality situated in Söderköping Municipality, Östergötland County
- Östra Husby, a locality situated in Norrköping Municipality, Östergötland County
- Husby Court District, a district of Dalarna
- Husby AIK, a Swedish football club located in Dala-Husby

== People ==
- Per Husby (born 1944), Norwegian musician, teacher, civil engineer, and orchestra leader
- Stig Roar Husby (born 1954), retired Norwegian long-distance runner
- Olaf Husby (1878–1948), Norwegian sport shooter
- Hans Husby, former lead vocalist of the Norwegian death-punk band Turbonegro
