= Johannes Matthiae Gothus =

Swedish Lutheran bishop

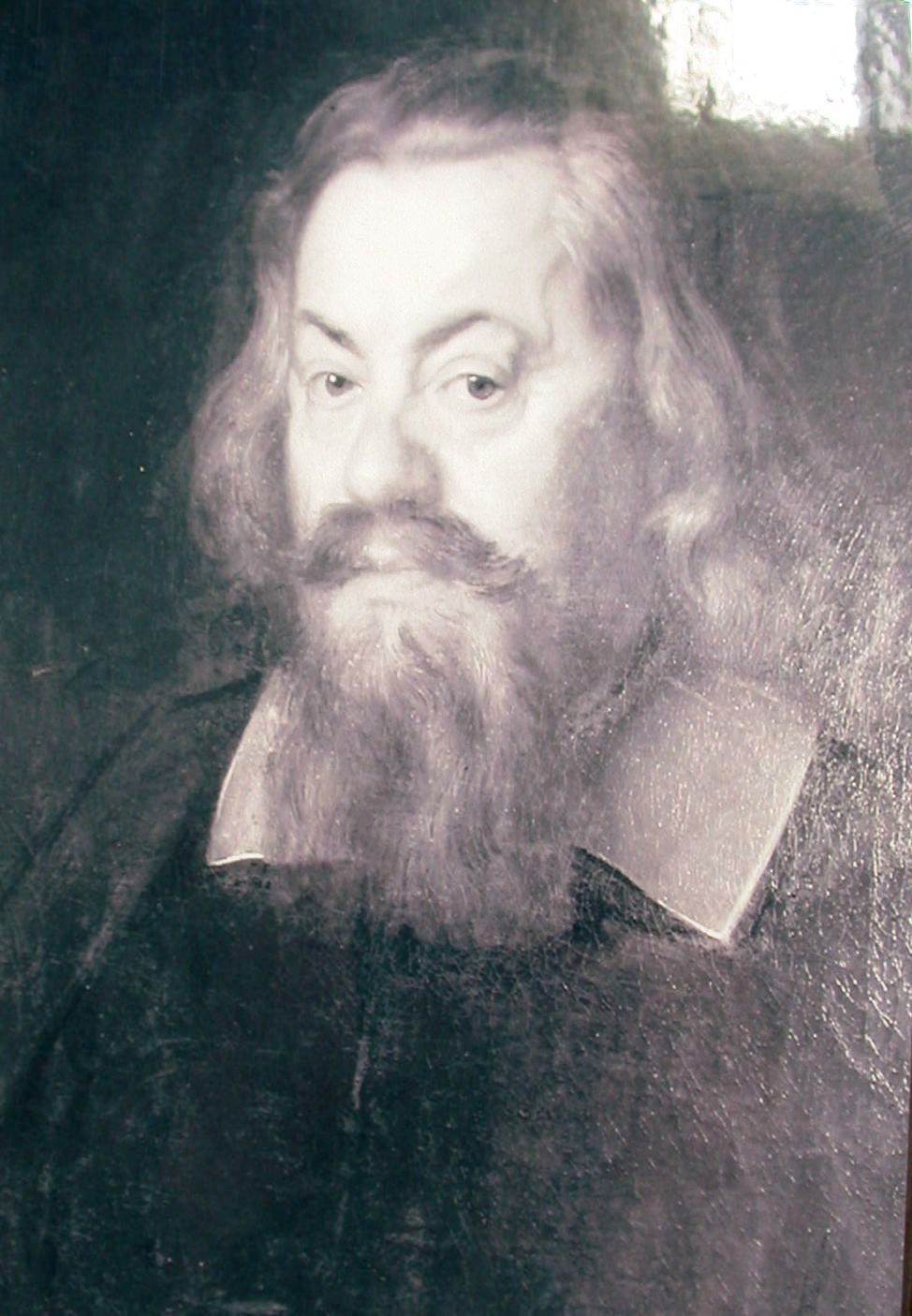
Johannes Matthiæ Gothus, painting by the French painter Sébastien Bourdon

Johannes Matthiae Gothus (29 December 1592 in Västra Husby – 18 February 1670 in Stockholm) was a Swedish Lutheran Bishop of Strängnäs and a professor of Uppsala University, the rector of the Collegium illustrious, Collegium Illustre (the school for young noblemen run by the House of Nobility) in Stockholm (1626–1629) and the most eminent teacher in Sweden during the seventeenth century. He was Bishop of Strängnäs from 1643 to 1664.

Gothus embodies like no other Swedish clergyman during the confessional era the continuity and renewal of the Reformed Evangelical humanist tradition in Sweden. He had very close contact with the Swedish royal house and with European reform circles; he was a dear friend of John Amos Comenius and John Dury. Thus, he exerted influence on the so-called folk teaching, school order of 1649, which he formulated himself, and on organisational issues relating to the Church. In particular, he was the spokesman for a so-called ecumenical, European religious policy. His fate was therefore sealed when, with the guardianship of 1660, the ecclesiastical cycles changed. He was, then, forced to resign from the position as bishop of Strängnäs. As a man of ecumenism, Gothus' has a special position in the Swedish and European Church history. His only equal, in approach and status, is the Bishop Nathan Söderblom.

== Family ==
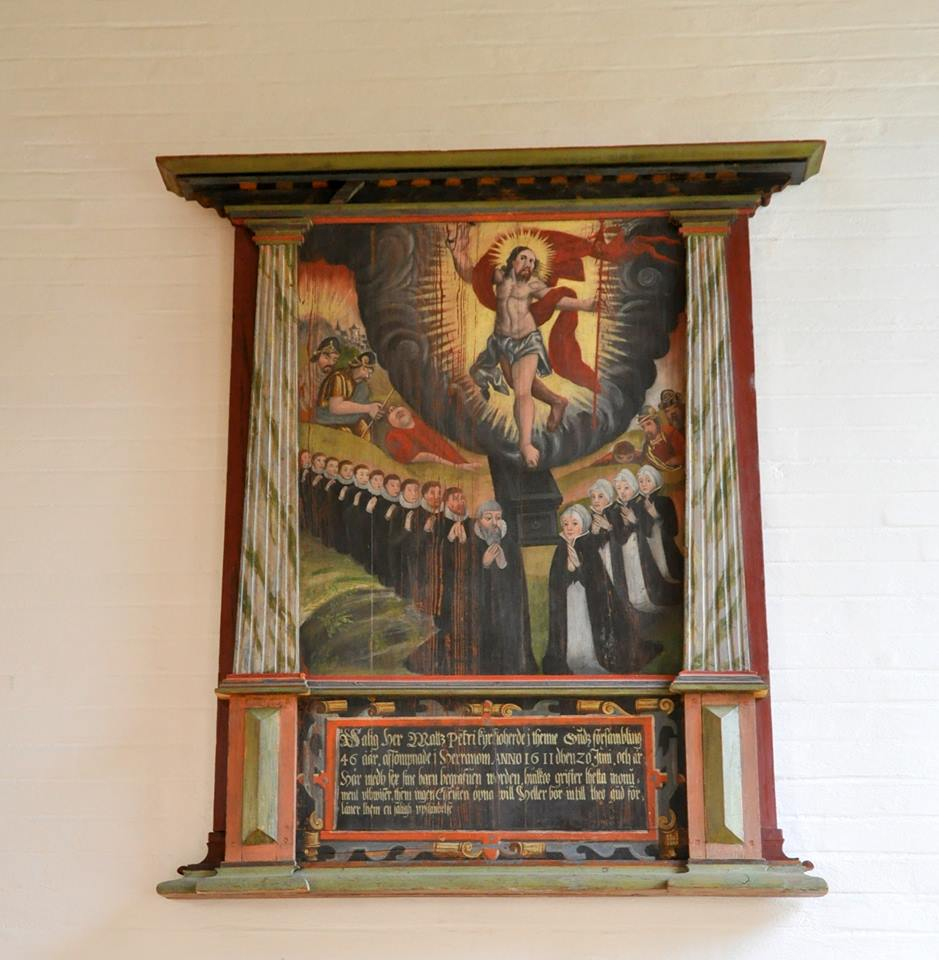
Epitaphium of Matthias Petri Upplänning, his wife, and children. Gothus was the youngest and can be seen furthest to the left

Gothus (born Johan Mattsson) was son of the vicar Matthias Petri Upplänning of Västra Husby (1533–1610) and Anna Danielsdotter Grubbe, the daughter of Daniel Jonsson Grubbe, the mayor of Norrköping. His father's, Matthias Petri Upplänning, ancestors had been part of the ancient frälse. A source claims that, Bishop Johannes Matthiae's paternal great-grandmother was Birgitta Vasa, a cousin of king Gustav Vasa. Gothus had 14 siblings, one of whom was the merchant in Söderköping Peder Mattsson Stiernfelt, later ennobled and introduced Stiernfelt. Gothus was great-uncle of Johan Hadorph.

Gothus was first married to Catarina Nilsdotter Bohm, the daughter of chamberlain of Kammarkollegiet, the Legal, Financial and Administrative Services Agency, Nils Olofsson Bohm and Karin Pedersdotter. The wedding ceremony was held at the Royal Palace in Stockholm in the autumn of 1634. His second wife was Beata Nilsdotter Lillieram, daughter of chancellor Nils Chesnecopherus Lillieram, the wedding was held at Rockelstad Castle in 1659, a bishop seat at the time.

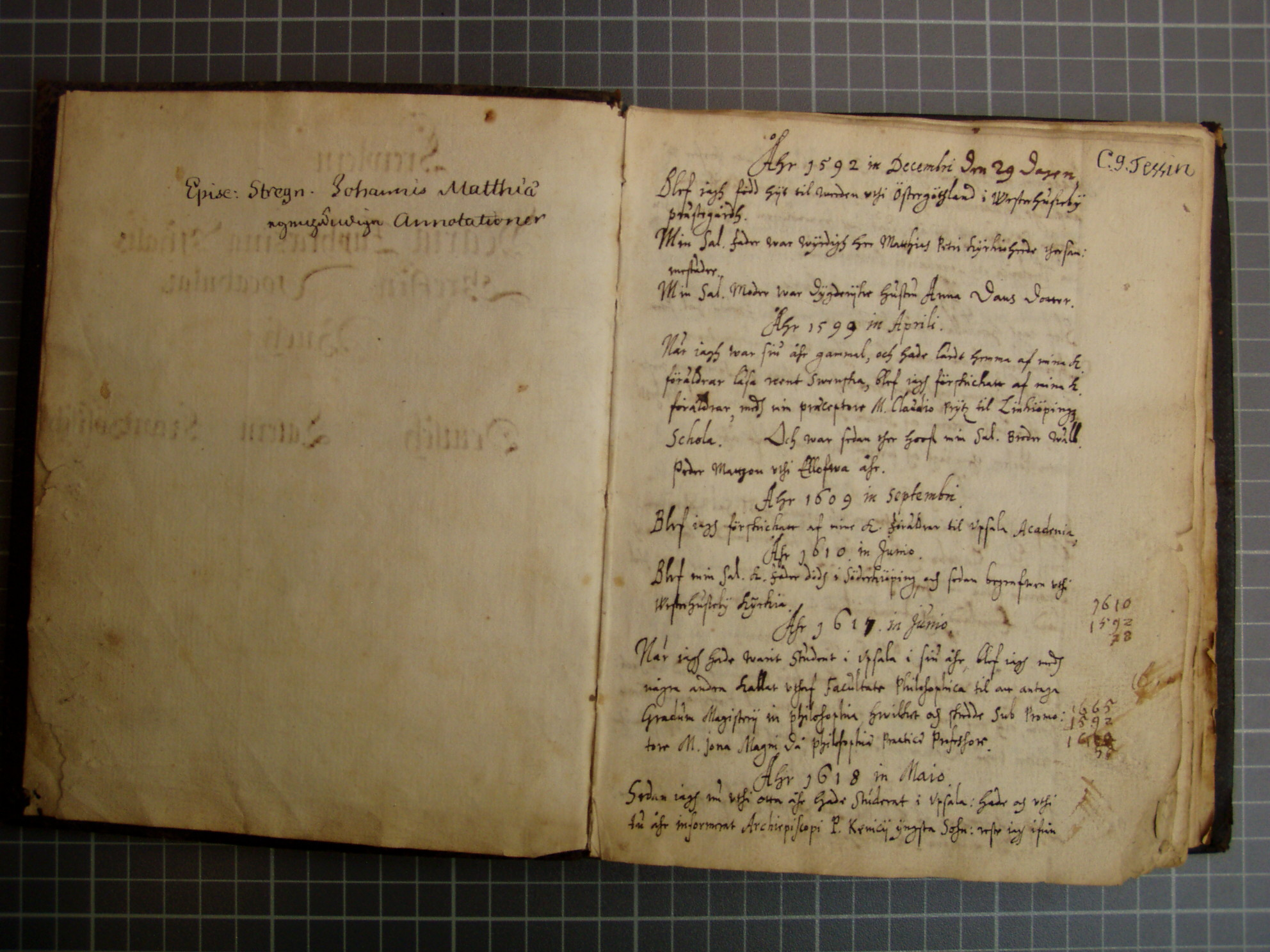
Johannes Matthiae Gothus diary

The children of Johannes Matthiae Gothus were introduced at the Riddarhuset, Swedish House of Nobility in Stockholm, under the name Oljeqvist as noble family number 331.

The following notes of his childrend's baptisms are taken from Johannes Matthiae Gothus's diary:

- Christina Johansdotter born 1636-02-14 in the court assembly, † 1636-07-20 of severe chest disease. Johannes Matthiae Gothus writes in his diary, "At twelve o'clock in the day, my dear daughter and first child Christina was born. God let her grow up and be disciplined in a true fear of God and all Christian virtues. The following Thursday, which was February 18, she was baptised right here in Stockholm at the palace, by Her Royal Highness the Dowager Queen's court preacher, M. Jacobo Tankio. The baptismal witnesses were Queen Maria Eleonora, the Queen Dowager, Queen Christina, the future queen, Miss Christina Pfaltz Countess, Seneschal of the Realm Mr. Gabriel Göstafsson Oxenstierna, Marshal of the Realm Jacob de la Gardie, Admiral of the Realm Mr. Carl Carlsson Gyllenhielm, Privy Council Mr. Johan Skytte, vice- president of the Court of Appeal, Mr. Carl Horn, Chancellor of the Court, Mr. Johan Salvius, secr. Nils Nilsson, Jacob Barchman, Lorentz Hartman, mistress of the court Mrs. Elisabeth Gyllenstierna, national treasurer Mrs. Anna Banér, cammar virgin, virgin. Brita Gyllenstierna, maiden Kerstin Boosdotter, court maiden, maiden Kirstin Curk, maiden Margareta Oxehufvud, Peder Rosenskiöldz's wife Catharina, Michel... wife Christina Barcsman. My dear daughter Christina lived a short time in this world. For when she was fourteen weeks old she fell ill by a violent chest-sickness, with which she struggled for a few weeks, until she blissfully and meekly fell asleep in the lord's room on June 20, 1636, when it was about four o'clock in the evening. She was, then, honorably buried in Strängnäs church on 23 June. M. Stephano Gallio court minister did the funeral ceremony .......(Latin). God redeem my blessed little daughter a joyful resurrection on... the last day.
- Johan Johansson Oljeqvist born 1637-04-11 in the court assembly, † unmarried in Hamburg/Paris/Amsterdam? Childless? Johannes Matthiae Gothus writes, "On April 11, the third day of Easter, a little before four o'clock, my dear son Johannes was born. God Almighty let him live and grow in age and grace both to God and men. The Friday after that, which was April 14, he was accepted into the Church of God in the Palace church by M. Stephano Gallio, court preacher, through the sacrament of ...5 baptism. The baptismal witnesses were Duke Carl Gustaf Pfalztzgref to the Rhine, Svea Rike's Council and Chamber Council Mr. Åke Axelsson, Svea Rike's Council and Reich Marshal Mr. Axel Banér, H.h Majt's Master of the Court Mr. Gustaf Horn, Chamberlain Christian Carlsson Oxenstierna, Court Junker Lorentz von der Lind, Councilman in Stockholm Hans Hansson, secr. in the Jönköping court Lars Bohm, feldher Jacob de la Gardie in Stockholm, Countess of Wisingsborg wife Ebba Brahe, Mr. Lars Sparre's wife Märta Banér, court maid, maiden Kristina Gyllenstierna, maiden Margareta Sefrding, legal doctor Jonas Botvidis wife Karin Nilsdotter, secr. in the court-martial Johan Nilsson's wife Brita."
- Gustav Johansson Oljeqvist born 1638-04-28 in the court assembly, † unmarried 1700-05-03 at Janslunda farm, Överselö sn. Chancellor of the Exchequer in 1665, bank commissioner in 1689, Russian diplomat and envoy. On April 28, a little before four o'clock, my dear son Gustaf was born. God Almighty bless and keep him and let him grow in the fear of the Lord and all lawful virtues. On the 1st of May, on Philippi Jacobi day, he was baptised in the church of God by the court preacher M. Stephano Gallio at Stockholm Palace. The witnesses at his baptism were... Chancellor Axel Oxenstierna, Privy Councillor, Admiral and Governor General Clas Fleming, Privy Councillor and Admiral Erich Ryning, Governor of Livland Bengt Oxenstierna, Colonel Gustav Gustavsson (Gustav of Vasaborg), Lord Chamberlain Gustaf Gabrielsson Oxenstierna, secr. status and the governor of Stockholm Palace Lars Grubbe, interest master Erich Ersson, chamberlain Bengt Hansson, queen Christina, Countess Palatine wife Catharina, chambermaid Brita Gyllenstierna, court maids Ebba Bielkenstierna and Ebba Gyllenstierna, secretary Johan Mån..wife Karin, B...Wib. .rs wife Margareta Strömberg.
- Anna Johansdotter Oljeqvist
- Nils Johansson Oljeqvist born 1641 Stockholm Palace, † 1690 Lundegård, Öland. Occupation: District Judge of Öland. Married 1:o Elisabeth Sabel † 1671-12-07. Married Birgitta Gyllenadler, daughter of Bishop Samuel Enander Gyllenadler. Johannes Matthiae Gothus writes, on December 10 between seven and eight o'clock in the morning on a Friday, my dear son Nils was born in Stockholm, God Almighty let him live and be brought up in discipline and fear of the Lord. The following Monday, which was December 13, he was baptised at the Palace by the court preacher M. Stephano Gallio. Witnesses of his baptism... persons Seneschal of the Realm Mr. Per Brahe the Younger, Chamberlains Johan Patkel and Axel Åhrfoh, First Proceptors Bengt Baaz and Carol. Pommweg, court bookkeeper Hindric Wulf, queen Christina, miss Eleonora Catharina, mistress of the court Mrs. Beata Oxenstierna, maiden Elisabeth Carlsdotter, wife Clara M. Aegidy Auly, wife Malin Joh. Leuchhovy, wives Anna Funk, Petter Bohms...
- Karin Johansdotter Oljeqvist
- Kristina Johansdotter Oljeqvist
- Elisabeth Johansdotter Oljeqvist
- Maria Johansdotter Oljeqvist
- Petrus Johansdotter Oljeqvist
- Carl Johansson Oljeqvist
- Maria Johansdotter
- Katarina Johansdotter Oljeqvist

== Career ==
=== Early life and education ===
Gothus' special position among the clergy is explained by his unique life course. He grew up in a milieu that was shaped by Duke Charles's struggle against Sigismund, the high nobility, the clergy and the practical-religious problem associated with immigration of foreign labor in the mining industry. His father, who was a church pastor in Söderköping, had, as one of the delegates of the clergy, signed the Söderköping Arvsförening in 1590, his 20-year-old brother was a pastor of Duke Charles in 1597, and since 1599 the church pastor in Norrköping, where the Confederate Confederate's through a wide-eyed congregational care assimilated the reformed population. Like Duke Charles, later Charles IX of Sweden, Gothus' came to work for an evangelical-humanist Church reform and to meet the opposition from the orthodox clergy.

During a ten-year study period, beginning in 1599 in Linköping, Gothus experienced Linköping Bloodbath and Norrköping's Arvsförening. Once the stormy decade of the 1590s had come to an end, he enrolled at Uppsala university. Upon enrolling, he immediately joined the pious religious controversy of the compatriot, the educated Johannes Messenius of Braunsberg Jesuit College, Collegium Hosianum, who was in conflict with the intrusive scholastic confessional representative Johannes Rudbeckius. During his stay in Uppsala, he received further impulses that would guide him in his independent spiritual direction. He enjoyed financial support from the East Gothic court circles and the burghers, from John, Duke of Östergötland and his wife, king Gustav II Adolf's sister Princess Maria Elizabeth of Sweden, and High Councillor Johan Skytte. His humanistic religious orientation is reflected in his studies of poetry under Messenius, whose dramas he performed on stage, in his dissertations in ethics, and in his position as informant of his relatives, the sons of Lutheran-Melanchthonic Archbishop Petrus Kenicius.

After studying in Uppsala, Gothus' came, in no less than seven years, between 1618 and 1625, to have Europe as his university. He made his first foreign study trip in 1618 to 1620, mainly to the Hessian university in Giessen. He deepened his piety focus during studies for the major ethical-religious-oriented theologian, university, church and school reformer Balthasar Mentzer the Elder. Gothus made only a brief visit to Sweden between his two long foreign trips during, which, he, in 1621, was appointed professor poesos at Uppsala university.

His second course of study was crucial to his life's work. In spite of all Lutheran-confessional regulations and scholastic-theological educational goals, he was exposed and deepened himself in the ethico-religious renaissance during his visits to Holland, England and France, not least in England, where there was a reaction to Calvinist neo-confessionalism, which prevailed at the Synod of Dort in 1619, and which Gothus' himself faced in a dissertation in Giessen.

=== Professorship and rectorship of Collegium Illustre ===
By the time Gothus returned home at the age of 32, he was a mature man with European broad-mindedness like no other Swedish theologian. He immediately became professor of theology at Uppsala University and rector and professor of the newly founded Collegium Illustre in Stockholm. At the time of the House of Knight's establishment, king Gustavus Adolphus had realised that the nobility needed education to maintain their position. Already in the preamble of the knight house order, the long-gone plans of a special school, exclusive to the nobility and located at the knight house, were clarified.

This teaching work was subsequently established in 1626 and was initially a success. The seven-year schooling would prepare the noble youngster for a career in the top tier of the kingdom. Johannes Matthiæ Gothus was appointed professor and principal. One of the school's facilitators, the Swedish National Council Johan Skytte, had the room decorated for teaching and published textbooks. Gustavus Adolphus, who sometimes heard the school's disputes, promised on 24 April 1627, an annual grant from the state funds for this so-called Collegium illustre on 2,000 dollars silver coins. The rest of the costs were taken out of the knight's house.

The Swedish Council, Johan Skytte, had the main leadership in its establishment and governance. Gothus provided the curriculum, Ratio studiorum; Plan of Studies. One of the most characteristic features of humanistic pedagogy was the practice of keeping notebooks; schoolboys were encouraged to compile commonplace books for reference use when they could read and write reasonably accurately. Ratio Studiorum lavished praise on notebook practice. Like numerous humanistic teaching programmes, it suggested that the students should excerpt sentences, proverbs, similes and other literary elements, write them down in a notebook and memorise them. According to Gothus, a schoolboy should begin at the age of eight with moral sentences of Publilius Syrus, Terence, Seneca, Cato and Cicero; at the age of ten, he should be introduced to sentences by Greek authors, first in Latin translations, later in the original Greek version.

The educational system consisted of a lower and a higher department. In the lower, which was seven-class and intended for children between seven and fourteen years of age, teaching was preferably communicated in the classical languages and French; in the higher, "auditorium publicum", lectures were held in philosophy, mathematics and eloquence. The intention was, in time, to include lectures that also covered theology, law and medicine, in other words, to form a full university in the capital. At the college, disputes were published and defended. The three professors were Johannes Matthiæ Gothus, author of the above-mentioned curriculum and finally bishop of Strängnäs diocese, Vilhelm Simonius and Jöran Lilja alias Georg Stiernhielm and, after his departure in 1628, Jacobus Boose Rudbeckius. Eeach day began and ended with prayer and Bible reading. In between, lessons were held in both classical and modern languages such as dialectics, rhetoric, physics and mathematics. Physical exercises were an important element in which teaching of singing, dance and instruments was interspersed with more warlike training in the preparation of troops as well as martial and equestrian art. Among the students was the future field master Carl Gustaf Wrangel.

The teachers' salaries were paid partly by the state (annual appropriation of 2000 dollars of copper coins, according to the royal letter of 27 April 1627) and partly by the knight house fund. The plague in 1629 interrupted the college's activities. At the same time, Johannes Matthiæ Gothus and Simonius were drawn to other fields of work. Rudbeckius was retained at work and pay until 1632, when his resignation college completely ceased. Collegium illustrations came to be short-lived. In 1629 the plague ravaged Stockholm and the nobility left the city. The lecture rooms were empty and the teachers undertook other assignments. It was formally dissolved three years later.

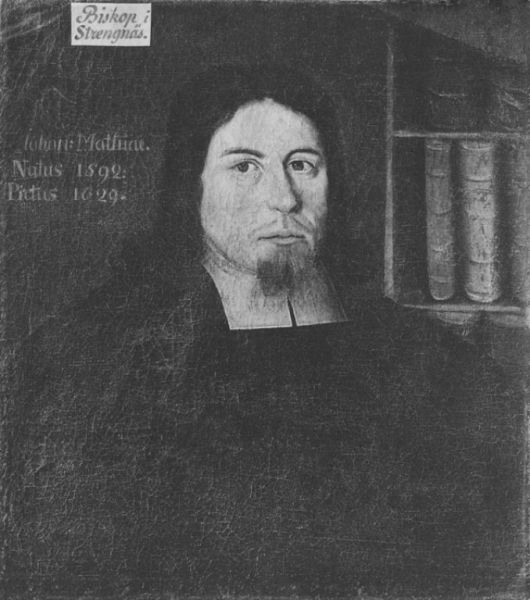

=== Court pastor and military bishop ===
In 1630–32 he accompanied king Gustavus Adolphus during the German campaign as field bishop in the Thirty Years' War and was responsible for the ecumenical negotiations with John Dury, which he completed during his stay in Sweden as an English envoy in 1636–38. During his time in Germany, he was, among other things, responsible for managing the inventory and stocktaking of the books from the libraries of Worms and Würzburg. In Mainz, he was assisted by the royal physician, Roberthonius, and doctor Henkel. He had enjoyed Gustavus Adolphus full support and was appointed by him to deal with the crown princess Christina's upbringing, with all the delicate religious-personal and ecumenical problems this involved with reformed family relations within the country and intended reformed goal for the young queen, both the current reform pedagogy and his foreign experience at the church board organisation.

=== Queen Christina's teacher ===
After the king's death, a guardian board was appointed, headed by the chancellor Axel Oxenstierna. Gustavus Adolphus had left instructions for her daughter's upbringing and selected her future governors and preceptors. It was of great importance that these were native men – Axel Banér was appointed governor and Gustaf Kristersson Horn af Åminne sub-governor. The teacher who would have the most long-term influence on the Queen was Johannes Matthiae Gothus who taught her languages, Swedish, German, French, Italian, Dutch, German, classical languages, including Latin, Greek and Hebrew, astronomy, physics, mathematics, history, philosophy, and religion. The goals of Kristina's upbringing as regent were regulated by the report of the Estates on 24 March 1635. Kristina would learn something about foreign customs because they were necessary for her rank and position, but she would "dress up" in the natives in the first place. The essence of her studies would be the word of God, the articles of Christianity, and all Christian virtues. It was emphasised that she would not be infected with "Papacy or Calvinist willpower". French, German, Italian and Dutch, in addition Latin and had knowledge of Greek, Hebrew and Arabic as well. Her scientific interest was mainly focused on classical philology, philosophy, theology, mathematics and astronomy.

Queen Kristina's relationship with her teacher was close; so close, he became like a father to her. She referred to him as father.

=== Later career and disputes ===
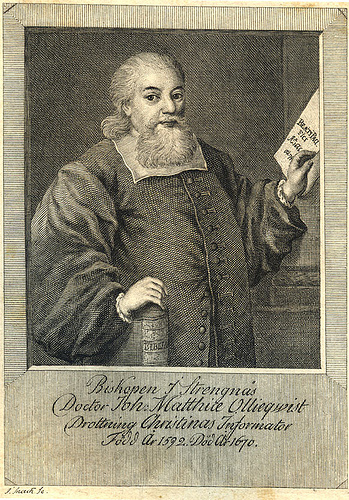

== Authorship ==
Gothus authored numerous writings that spread throughout much of 17th-century Europe. He published at least 92 printed writings, of which 67 were books on religion, seven sermons, four on linguistics, including an introduction to Latin grammar, dedicated to Queen Christina. Of these books, 61 are written in Latin, 28 in Swedish, of which seven are sermons. One book in German, one in Dutch and one in French.

== Manors and estates ==
Johannes Matthiae received gifts and great fiefs from Christina, Queen of Sweden and the Queen Mother. He owned more than 33 large estates and manors and a number of smaller properties in different parts of Sweden. These were part of the crown payment.

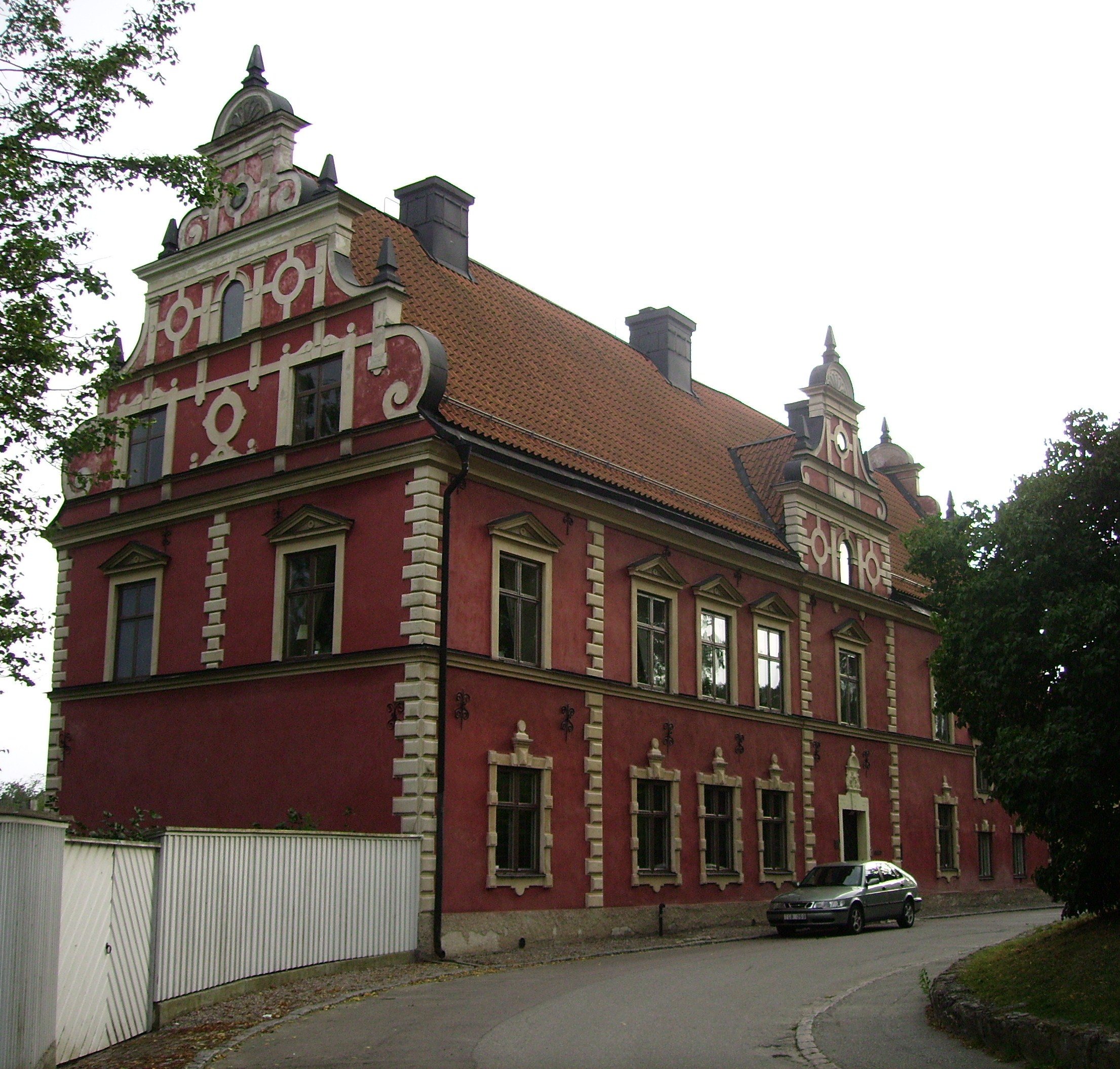
Strängnäs Bishop Palace, built by Johannes Matthiae Gothus

He built Strängnäs Bishop's Palace, which still stands today. Rockelstad castle was in Gothus' possession and thus functioned as a Bishop's palace. He also owned Söderlänna Manor.

== Ancestors ==
Ancestors of Johannes Matthiae Gothus

16. Peder Nilsson Upplänning of Mörby
8. District judge, bailiff at Stockholm Palace, Mats Persson Upplänning
17. Christina Puke
4. Peder Mattsson Upplänning
18. Cristiern Johansson Vasa till Örby
9. Birgitta "Brita" Cristiernsdotter Vasa
19. Dorotea Knutsdotter Banér
2. Vicar of Västra Husby, Matthias Petri Upplänning
5. Catharina Eriksdotter Puke
1. Johannes Matthiae Gothus
6. [[Mayor of Norrköping, Dan Jonsson Grubbe]]
3. Anna Danielsdotter Grubbe
7. NN

== Bibliography ==
- Pentapoligrammaton Ostrogothiae, Stockholm 1613.
- Gust. Adolphus, in coronationis festo carmine elegiaco celebratus, Uppsala 1617.
- Oratio insignes peregrinationis utilitates continens, Uppsala 1618.
- Threnodia in obitam Princ. Johannis, Ib. e.a.
- Naenia in obitum Princ. Mariae Elis. e.a.
- Syntagma breve Theologicum publicatum, Lips. 1622.
- Disp. Theol. de Sacra Coena, Stockholm 1625.
- Libellus puerilis in quo continentur V. primaria capita doctrinae Christianae cum praecationibus aliquot sacris quinque linguis comprehensa, Latina, Suetica, Gallica, Germanica, Anglica, Ib. 1626.
- Gnomologia veterum Latinorum Poetarum & Historicorum Laberii, Syrii, Plauti, Terentii, Seneeae, Virgilii, Ovidii, etc Ib. 1627.
- Disp. duae de ministerio ecclesiastico prop. in Coll. ill., Stockholm 1628, Strängnäs 1659.
- Ratio discendi Linguam Latinam pro Christina Regina, Stockholm 1635. (Omtryckt 1650 av Bachorn med titeln Grammatica Regia, vilket medförde att många fick uppfattningen att det var Bachorns eget verk).
- Ratio studiorum ante decennium ad petitionem D. D. Directorum ill. Collegii Stockholm conscripta, Ib 1636
- Summa öfwer den reena saliggiörande Catholske Christelige läran uthdragne af then Hel. Skrift, Ib 1640, Strängnäs 1659.
- Grammatica latina contracta, Ib 1674.
- Likpredikningar över: Riksrådet baron Gustaf Horn, Stockholm 1641.; Biskop Wallius, Ib 1641.; Fältmarsk Johan Banér, Ib 1641.; Ärkebiskop Laurentius Paulinus, Uppsala 1646.; R. R. Thure Sparres fru Maria Axelsdotter, Strängnäs 1650.; Anna Bååt, 1650.; Likcermon öfver Pfalzgrefven Johan Casimir och dess sonson Gustaf Adolf, Ib 1652
- Een predikan vid Dr. Christinae inträde uti Regementet 1643, Strängnäs 1644.
- Examen Cathecheticum, thet är Cathechismiförhör uthöffuer Strängnäs Biskopsdöme etc., Strängnäs 1652.
- Pastoralus Zelotypia, Ib. 1645, 1649.
- Methodus concionandi, Ib. 1652 och 1659.
- Idea boni Ordinis in ecclesia Christi, Ib. 1644 och 1659.
- Epistolarum decades X de universe munere pastorali ete., Ib. 1652 och 1659.
- Quaerela de praepostero quorundam judicio in castigando aliorum scriptis, centum propositionibus inclusa, Ib 1646 och 1660.
- Form eller sätt att visitera kyrkor och församblingar, Ib. 1653.
- Form eller sätt om förberedelse till then heliga nattvarden etc., Ib. 1653.
- Form eller sätt att begynna gudstjensten uthi en nybygd kyrka, hwilket man gemenligen kallar kyrkiowigning, Ib. 1654.
- Form eller sätt att insättia kyrkioherdar i theras församblingar, Ib. 1654.
- Regula credendi er virendi, salutiferam verbi divini veritatem, catholica articulorum fidei Christianae delineatione complexa et ad Christinam Augustam Reginam transmissa, Ib. 1649.
- Strengnäs Kyrkie- och hwsbok, Ib. 1658.
- Ulysses verae Christianae Religionis eller Wägwisare till den sanna Christeliga religionen etc., Ib. 1659.
- Form eller sätt huru gudztiensten må förrättas etc., Ib. 1659.
- Positiones de disciplina ecclesiastica, Ib. 1661.
- Formula Catholicae priscae et orthodoxae fidei in primorum ecelesiae Christianae Oecumen. Conciliorum symbolis aliisque confessionibus exposita, Ib. 1665.
- Quaestiones Regiae et Responsiones Sapientum ex vetustissima historiae Aristeae et LXX Interpretibus deductae, Ib. e.a.
- Ramus Olivae Septentrionalis I:us et II:us Baccas nonnullas religiosae paci suaviter redolentes et concordiae Ecclesiasticae sadras inter Christianos diffundes etc., Ib. 165
- Ramus etc. III:us
- X:us, Ib. 1661
- Register öfver the förnemste Stycken och Capitel, som synes höra till en fullkombligh kyrkieordningh eller then Svenskes överseende och förbättringh, Stockholm 1633.
- Confessio fidei Suio Gothicae. Thet är: then Christel. Trosbekjännelse, hvilke Guds försambling uthi Sveriges Rijke allmänneliga trodt och bekiändt hafver, ifrån thet Evangelii sanning uti Kon. Gustaffs regementz tijd etc., Strängnäs 1657.
- Opuscula Theologica, Ib. 1661. (20 afhandlingar, förut tryckta, men nu utg. I ett band, förbättrade och tillökte).
- Kyrkie- och Huuspostilla, Stockholm 1666
- Apparatus biblicus eller anledning till then heliga bibels och kyrkones historiens grundeliga förstånd, Ib. 1660.
- Kyrkiones historia…intill närvarande tidh, Ib. 1669
- Sacrarum disquisitionum decas una ad refutandos Epicureos, Atheos et Fanaticos etc., Ib. 1169.

(Omständligare titlar läsas i bibl. Suio Goth. II delen s221-234, Schefferi Svecia Lit. Och hofclerc. Historia II delen s554-567).
