= Huseby =

Huseby is a surname. Notable people with the surname include:

- Dagfin Huseby (1922–2010), Norwegian wrestler
- Gunnar Huseby (1923–1995), Icelandic track and field athlete
- Magnar G. Huseby (1928–2011), Norwegian engineer and politician
- Olaf Huseby (1856–1942), Norwegian-American bookseller and publisher

== See also ==
- Husebye
- Husby
