= Tommeidet boat burial =

Viking Age double boat burial in Nordland, Norway

- Hilt and upper blade of the iron sword from the burial
- Interactive map of Tommeidet boat burial
- 66.267°N 12.728°E
- Type: Double boat burial
- Periods: Viking Age, 10th century
- Location: Tommeidet, Tomma, Nesna, Nordland, Norway

Site notes
- Excavation dates: 1910
- Archaeologists: Karl Rygh

Tommeidet boat burial (also spelled Tommeide) is a Viking Age double boat burial on the island of Tomma in Nesna Municipality, Nordland, Norway. It was excavated by Karl Rygh in 1910.

In the 2020 study "Population genomics of the Viking world", a genetic sample from a male skeleton's tooth was analyzed and identified as VK524 and dated to the 10th century. His skeleton was found within a group of clustered burial mounds in the western part of Tomma, Norway, in 1910. Inside the boat burial, a female skeleton lay next to him; it has not been identified genetically. The burial mound was excavated by the Norwegian archaeologist Karl Rygh and documented in the publication "Arkæologiske undersøgelser 1910".

During the excavation, grave goods, including animal bones, weapons, tools, jewelry, and dress accessories, were found and are housed at the NTNU University Museum in Trondheim, Norway. The surviving male skeleton is known by the anthropological reference A3708 and is cataloged by the museum as T9378.

== Location ==
Tomma island is located along the northern Norway coastline in Nordland county, near the town of Nesna. The island is approximately 48 square kilometers (19 sq mi). Tomma is located at the entrance of the Sjona fjord.

Tommeidet is a rural coastal farm in western Tomma and is where VK524's burial was found and documented in 1910. Rygh described his burial mound "e" as located north of the farm buildings.

Mountain landscape at Tommeidet

Farmland and the sea at Tommeidet

== Burial ground ==
In 1884, Knut Lossius documented one long mound and seven round mounds at the site, which corresponds to the location later described by Rygh. He recorded that there were ditches around the mounds and that boat rivets and unburned bones had already been discovered in two of the round mounds.

According to the 1910 description, eight burial mounds were found adjacent to VK524's boat burial. Rygh described a group of round and elongated mounds north of the farm buildings.

Mound "e" was the location of VK524's boat burial and was no longer visible above the ground by 1978.

Plan of the burial mounds, from Karl Rygh's 1910 excavation report (Fig. 5)

== Excavation ==
Title page of Karl Rygh's report "Arkæologiske undersøgelser 1910" (Trondhjem, 1910)

Rygh describes mound "e" as about 6.5 by 5.5 meters (21 ft × 18 ft), with stones under the turf, then a thick layer of clean beach sand holding the burial. He found about 30 scattered clench nails, which showed that a boat had been aligned southwest–northeast. Near the center of the mound were the well-preserved skull and long bones of a male, with a sword along his right side, a ring-pin on his chest, and a shield boss at his left side.

There was a second skeleton next to him on his left, less well preserved. Rygh found an oval brooch high on each side of her chest, a trefoil brooch between them, four beads at her neck, and a sickle blade and a spearhead at her left side.

Rygh concluded that the grave could not be earlier than the 10th century.

It is of particular interest because it is a certain example of a double grave in which a man and a woman were laid side by side at the same time. In view of the structure of the mound and the positions of the skeletons and grave goods, it is entirely out of the question here that the mound was reopened and one of the bodies inserted later.

— Karl Rygh, Arkæologiske undersøgelser 1910 (translated from Norwegian)

== Grave goods ==
The surviving objects Karl Rygh found in the boat burial are held at the NTNU University Museum in Trondheim, Norway. In 1917, the Norwegian archaeologist Haakon Schetelig documented the grave in his catalog of Norwegian boat graves. He also dated the oval brooches to the 10th century.

Selected finds from the burial at the NTNU University Museum

Objects from mound e, as described in Karl Rygh's list of the collection's 1910 accessions
| Image | Object (Note: R. numbers refer to the numbered figures in Oluf Rygh's Norske Oldsager (1885), which are used as type references.) | Description (Rygh 1911) |
|---|---|---|
| Two domed, oval bronze brooches with openwork decoration and a green and gold patina, side by side | Pair of oval brooches, bronze Type: R. 652 · Rygh: woman | Oval and bowl-shaped. Pieces of cloth, in part clearly linen, are rusted fast to both the inner and outer sides. |
| Three-lobed bronze brooch covered in dense relief ornament with a green patina, resting on the fingers of a hand, with a small hole drilled near the edge of one lobe | Trefoil brooch, bronze Type: somewhat like R. 671 · Rygh: woman | White coating on the back. At the ends of the lobes: a double pin hinge, closed at the back; a pin catch, with a rusted iron pin between the two; and an upright crest with a (broken-open) hole, in which a chain probably hung. In addition, a hole has been drilled through the brooch itself near the edge of this lobe, probably to replace the first hole after it was damaged. |
| Four round black glass beads with crossing white bands and small red dots, on textured foam beside a museum tag | Four beads, black glass paste Rygh: woman | Each has two white, crossing bands encircling four knobs of applied glass in alternating white, red and green. |
| Four elongated, brownish bone fragments on textured foam, one tied with white string, beside a museum tag Small, dark, corroded iron fragment on textured foam beside a museum label | Needle case (probable), bone Rygh: woman | Four pieces of a thin-walled bone cylinder. The original length cannot be determined; the inner width was at least 1 cm. Traces of iron rust inside. |
| | Sickle blade, iron Rygh: woman | Incomplete; now 29 cm long and up to 3 cm wide. The tang went 6 cm into the handle. |
| Green-patinated bronze pin whose curled head loops through a flat, horseshoe-shaped ring | Ring-pin, bronze Rygh: man | Pin 9 cm long, round in its middle part and flattened at the upper and lower ends, bent at the top around the ring. The ring is flat and shaped like a horseshoe; its ends are joined by a round bar around which the pin is bent. |
| Heavily corroded iron sword with a crossguard and a pommel, lying on white foam with the hilt at the top, and the number 9372 painted on the blade | Double-edged sword, iron Type: guards closest to R. 495 · Rygh: man | Blade 83 cm long and 6 cm wide at the top, with a broad fuller along its whole length, covered with rusted-on wood from the scabbard. Unlike R. 495, instead of a pommel knob there is a small peak on the upper side of the upper guard. |
| Corroded iron spearhead with a long, narrow blade, beside two dark, rust-stained wooden fragments on textured foam | Double-edged spearhead, iron Rygh: man | 32 cm long, of which only 15 cm is blade. A 4 cm piece of the wooden shaft is also preserved projecting beyond the socket, heavily impregnated with rust. |
| Dark, corroded iron shield boss with a cord tied through it, above several detached iron fragments on white foam | Shield boss, iron Type: approximately R. 562 · Rygh: man | Slight constriction above the rim; internal diameter about 16 cm at the base. A completely preserved rivet shows that the shield board was no more than 7–8 mm thick. |
| | Axe blade, iron Type: cf. R. 552 · Rygh: man (lay somewhat to one side) | Edge somewhat rusted away; now 14 cm long. |
| Dozens of corroded, rust-brown iron clench nails and fragments in a white foam-lined tray | Clench nails, iron Rygh: not assigned | A collection of clench nails, 2–2.5 cm long between the heads. |
| About a dozen corroded iron fragments laid out in a foam-lined box, with a museum tag | Fittings, iron Rygh: not assigned | Several pieces, including two 10 cm long with rounded ends, each with three clench nails by which they were fastened to a board no more than 1 cm thick. |

== Human remains and ancient DNA ==
DNA from the skeleton (from a tooth) found in the Tommeidet boat burial was sampled and analyzed in the 2020 study "Population genomics of the Viking world". His identifier in the study is VK524, labeled "Norway_Nordland 3708". His Y-DNA haplogroup is I1a2a1a1d1a and his mtDNA haplogroup is HV0a1.

His estimated age at death is 40–50 years, and the radiocarbon date suggests his death between the mid-10th and early 11th centuries. Subsequent analysis of his skull showed a well-healed depression "most likely from blunt force trauma", suffered before his death; no injuries from around the time of death were recorded.

The bones of VK524 are also held by the university museum in Trondheim. According to Strand, only one of the two individuals buried in the grave, the male, has been identified.
