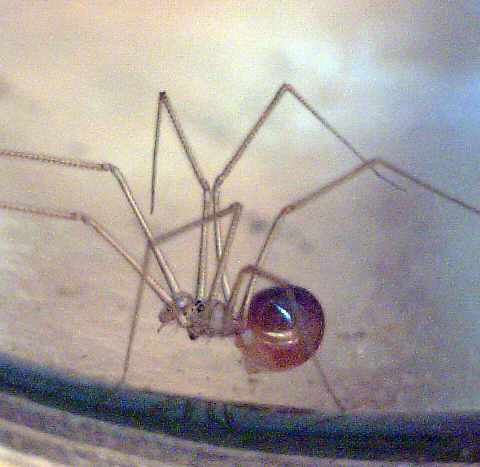

Scientific classification
- Domain: Eukaryota
- Kingdom: Animalia
- Phylum: Arthropoda
- Subphylum: Chelicerata
- Class: Arachnida
- Order: Araneae
- Infraorder: Araneomorphae
- Family: Pholcidae
- Genus: Spermophora
- Species: S. senoculata

Binomial name
- Spermophora senoculata (Dugès, 1836)

= Spermophora senoculata =

Species of spider

Spermophora senoculata, the shortbodied cellar spider, is a species of cellar spider in the family Pholcidae. It is found in Near East, and it has been introduced into the USA, southern Europe, China, Korea, and Japan.

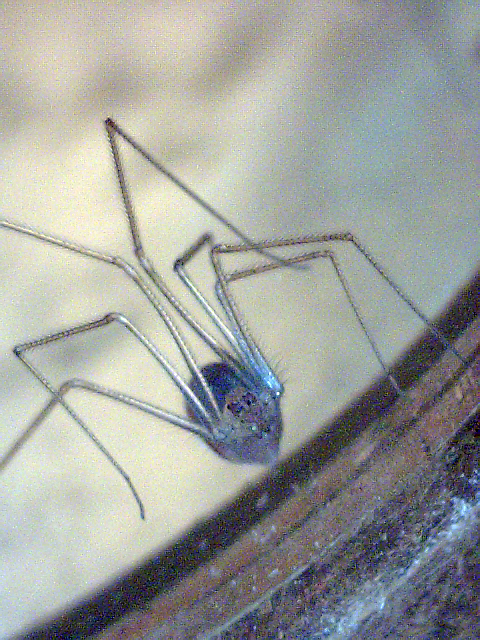
