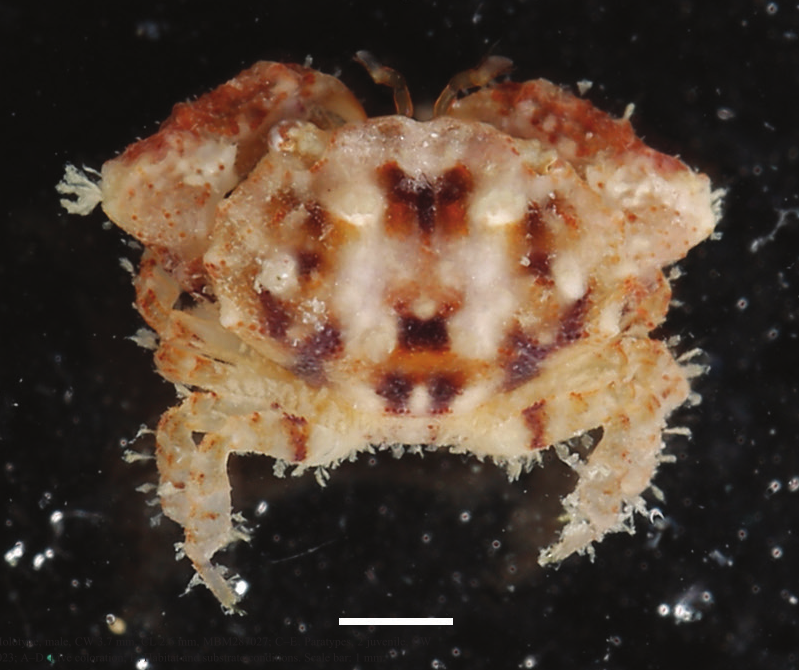
- Holotype of Gothus teemo (Scale bar: 1 mm (0.039 in))

Scientific classification
- Domain: Eukaryota
- Kingdom: Animalia
- Phylum: Arthropoda
- Class: Malacostraca
- Order: Decapoda
- Suborder: Pleocyemata
- Infraorder: Brachyura
- Family: Xanthidae
- Genus: Gothus
- Species: G. teemo

Binomial name
- Gothus teemo Yuan, Jiang, and Sha, 2024
- Range of Gothus teemo in the South China Sea

= Gothus teemo =

Species of crab

Gothus teemo is a species of crab and the type species of the genus Gothus. It was discovered in 2024 by Zi-Ming Yuan, Wei Jiang, and Zhong-Li Sha, based on specimens in the South China Sea. It is named after the board game Go as well as the League of Legends playable character Teemo.

== Etymology ==
Gothus teemo is named after Teemo, a champion (playable character) in the multiplayer online battle arena video game League of Legends. The crab's small size, brown stripes and dense covering of setae were compared to the short stature and fluffy brown and white fur coat of the raccoon-inspired character. It is the first animal species to be named after a League of Legends character.

The genus name Gothus refers to the game of Go, owing to similarities of the carapace patterns and granules with a Go board and stones. The suffix -thus is common in xanthid genera.

== Description ==
Gothus teemo is a small species of crab. All known specimens are less than 1 centimetre (0.39 in) in carapace width, with the holotype measuring 3.7 millimetres (0.15 in). The body is white to coral pink, with the carapace, legs and chelipeds bearing symmetrical brown to black stripes. The anterior carpus of the chelipeds are red, while the fingers are brown to black.

The carapace, covered in small round granules, is one and a half times longer than it is wide, and divided into two triangular lobes by a V-shaped notch. The body is densely covered in short setae, giving the crab what has been described as a fluffy appearance.

== Taxonomy ==
Gothus teemo is the type species of the genus Gothus, forming a clade with its other species Gothus consobrinus in all phylogenetic analyses. G. teemo is distinguished from G. consobrinus by, among other traits, more pronounced carapace regions bearing tufts of setae, as well as a fully reduced first tooth on the carapace margin.

The genus belongs in the family Xanthidae, although its exact placement is uncertain.

== Distribution and habitat ==
The species is known to inhabit crevices inside shallow coral reefs. Specimens have been found on Triton Island in the Paracel Islands and Mischief Reef of the Spratly Islands, both in the South China Sea.

== See also ==
- List of organisms named after works of fiction
