= Tomma =

Island in Nesna, Norway

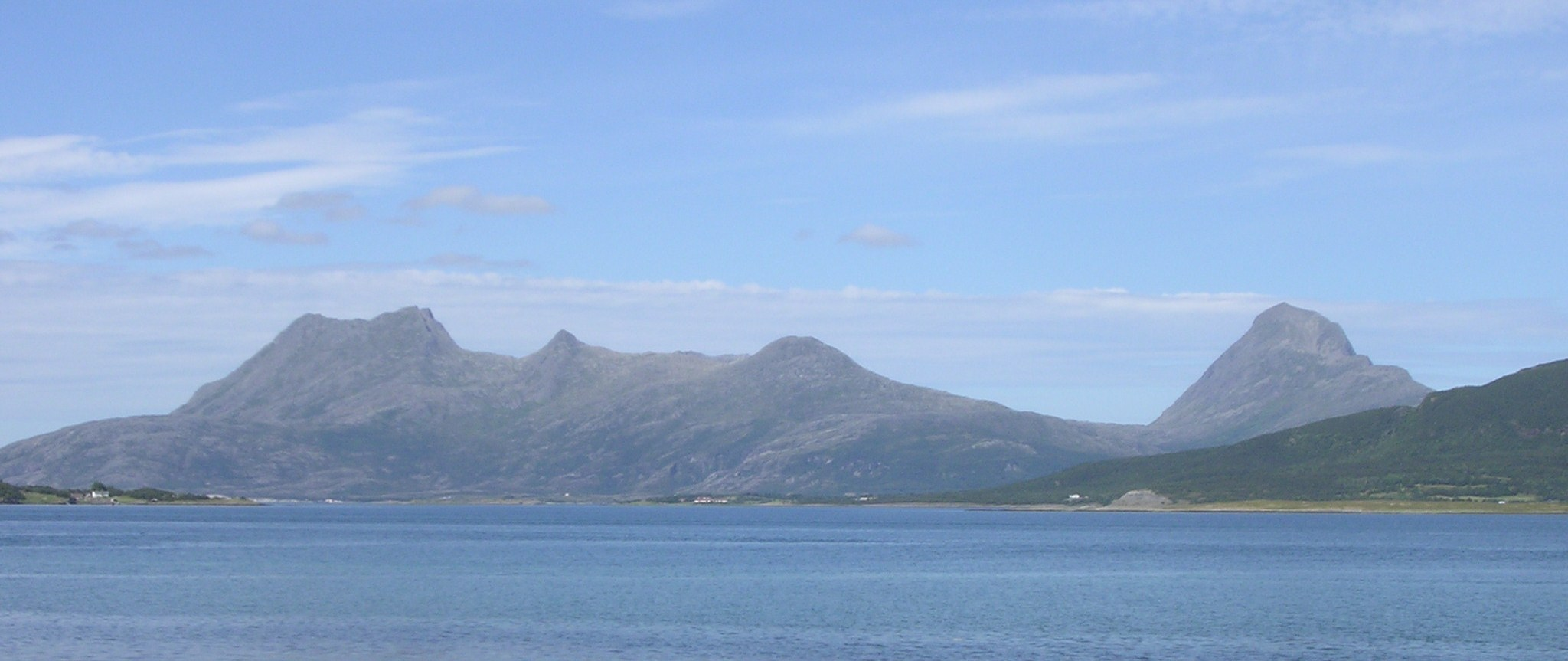
- View of Tomma seen from the east
- Interactive map of Tomma

Geography
- Location: Nordland, Norway
- Coordinates: 66.2465°N 12.7157°E
- Area: 47.3 km^{2} (18.3 sq mi)
- Length: 10 km (6 mi)
- Width: 9 km (5.6 mi)
- Highest elevation: 922 m (3025 ft)
- Highest point: Tomskjevelen

Administration
- Norway
- County: Nordland
- Municipality: Nesna Municipality

Tomma is an island in Nesna Municipality in Nordland county, Norway. The 47.3-square-kilometre (18.3 sq mi) island sits to the west of the islands of Handnesøya and Hugla. The island is at the southern entrance to the Sjona fjord. The main settlement on this island is the village of Husby, where the old Husby Estate and the Husby Chapel are located.

Map of Nesna

== Name ==
The Old Norse form of the name was Þǫmb. This name is probably identical with the word þǫmb which means "paunch" or "belly". (It is common in Norway to compare topographic elements with parts of the human body.)

== History ==
In 1910, the Norwegian archaeologist Karl Rygh excavated a Viking Age double boat burial containing a man and a woman at the farm Tommeidet.

== See also ==
- List of islands of Norway
