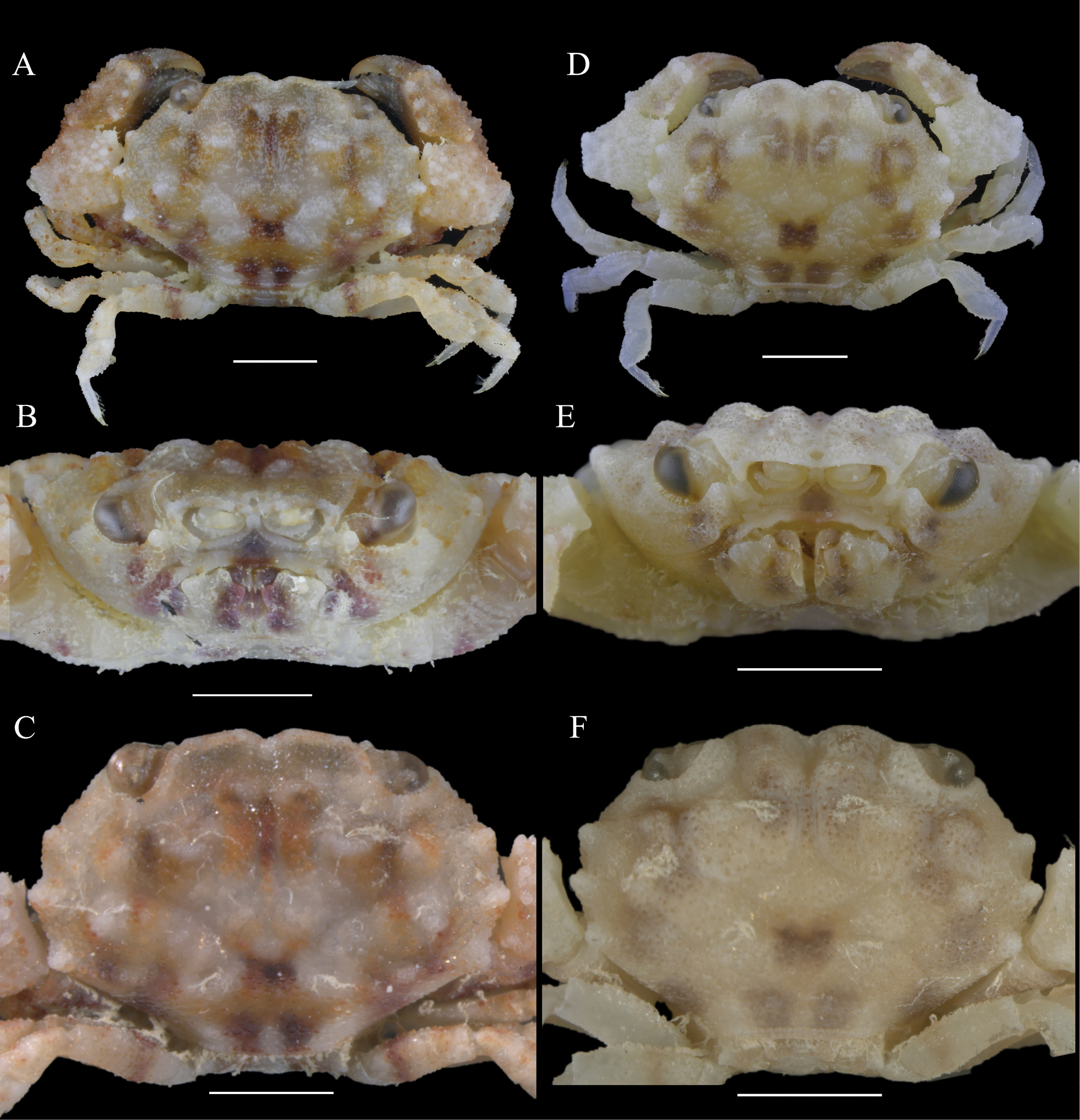
- Holotype and paratype of Gothus teemo

Scientific classification
- Domain: Eukaryota
- Kingdom: Animalia
- Phylum: Arthropoda
- Class: Malacostraca
- Order: Decapoda
- Suborder: Pleocyemata
- Infraorder: Brachyura
- Family: Xanthidae
- Subfamily: Euxanthinae
- Genus: Gothus; Yuan, Jiang, and Sha, 2024

Type species
- Gothus teemo Yuan, Jiang, and Sha, 2024

Other species
- Gothus consobrinus (A. Milne-Edwards, 1873)

= Gothus (crab) =

Genus of crab

Gothus is a genus of crab in the family Xanthidae, known from the Indo-West Pacific. The genus comprises two species, Gothus consobrinus and the type Gothus teemo.

== Etymology ==
Gothus is named after the game of Go, referencing the similarity of the carapace patterns and granules with a Go board and stones. The suffix -thus is common in xanthid genera.

== Description ==
Individuals of Gothus are small crabs of less than 10 millimetres (0.39 in) of carapace width. The carapace is vibrantly colored, and covered in small, round granules and tufts of setae. The regions of the carapace are clearly defined, with the front divided by a V-shaped notch. The anterolateral margin of the carapace bears four teeth on each side, where the first is flattened and not always clearly defined. Gothus has been described as closest morphologically to Rhizaltus, although the latter's carapace does not show defined teeth.

== Taxonomy ==
The genus Gothus comprises two known species. The type species, Gothus teemo, was described alongside the genus. The other species, Gothus consobrinus, was originally described as Actaea consobrina in 1873, before being transferred to Actaeodes in 1967. Molecular phylogeny confirms that the two species form a clade.

Inside Xanthidae, the genus has tentatively been placed in the subfamily Euxanthinae, although molecular phylogeny has questioned the monophyly of the subfamily. The position of Gothus is not stable, with the genus variously clustering with Liomerinae or with Xanthias and parts of Euxanthinae depending on the analysis.

== Distribution and habitat ==
Species in the genus are known to inhabit crevices inside shallow coral reefs. G. consobrinus was originally described from Upolu in modern-day Samoa, and is widely known from the Indo-West Pacific. Specimens have been reported in Japan, the Philippines, Vietnam and Australia, among other places. G. teemo has only been found in the Paracel and Spratly Islands of the South China Sea.
