= Husby, Norway =

Village in Nesna Municipality, Norway

Husby
- Village
- Interactive map of Husby
- Location within Nordland Location within Norway
- Coordinates: 66.2256°N 12.7697°E
- Country: Norway
- Region: Northern Norway
- County: Nordland
- District: Helgeland
- Municipality: Nesna Municipality
- Elevation: 10 m (33 ft)
- Time zone: UTC+01:00 (CET)
  - Summer (DST): UTC+02:00 (CEST)
- Post Code: 8723 Husby

Husby is a village on the island of Tomma in Nesna Municipality in Nordland county, Norway. It is located on the southwestern part of the island, along the Stilfjorden. It is the location of the Husby Estate and the Husby Chapel.

Husby (and the island of Tomma) historically has been a part of Nesna, but it (temporarily) belonged to Dønnes Municipality from 1 July 1888 until 1 January 1962 when it became part of Nesna Municipality once again.

== Media gallery ==
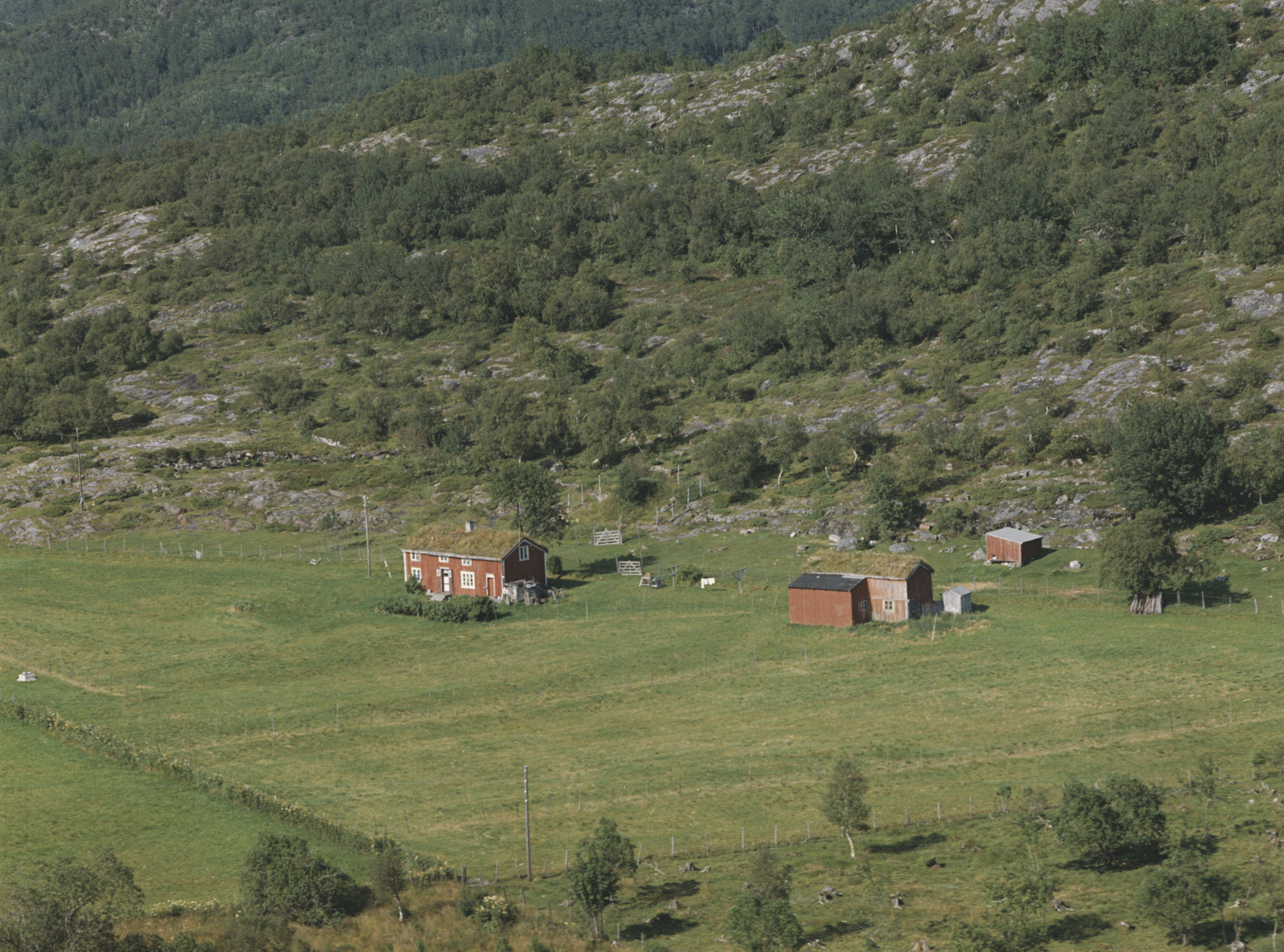

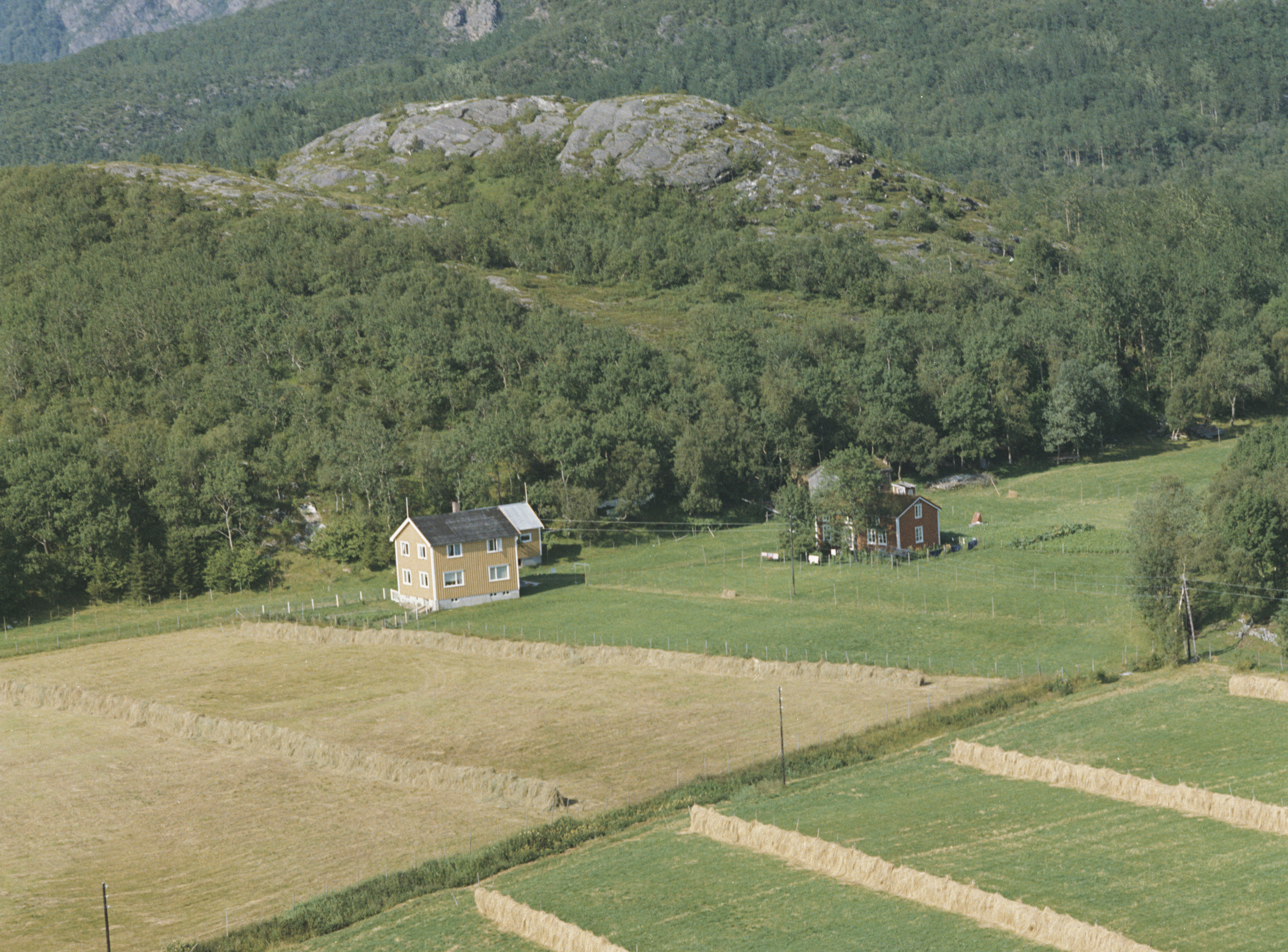

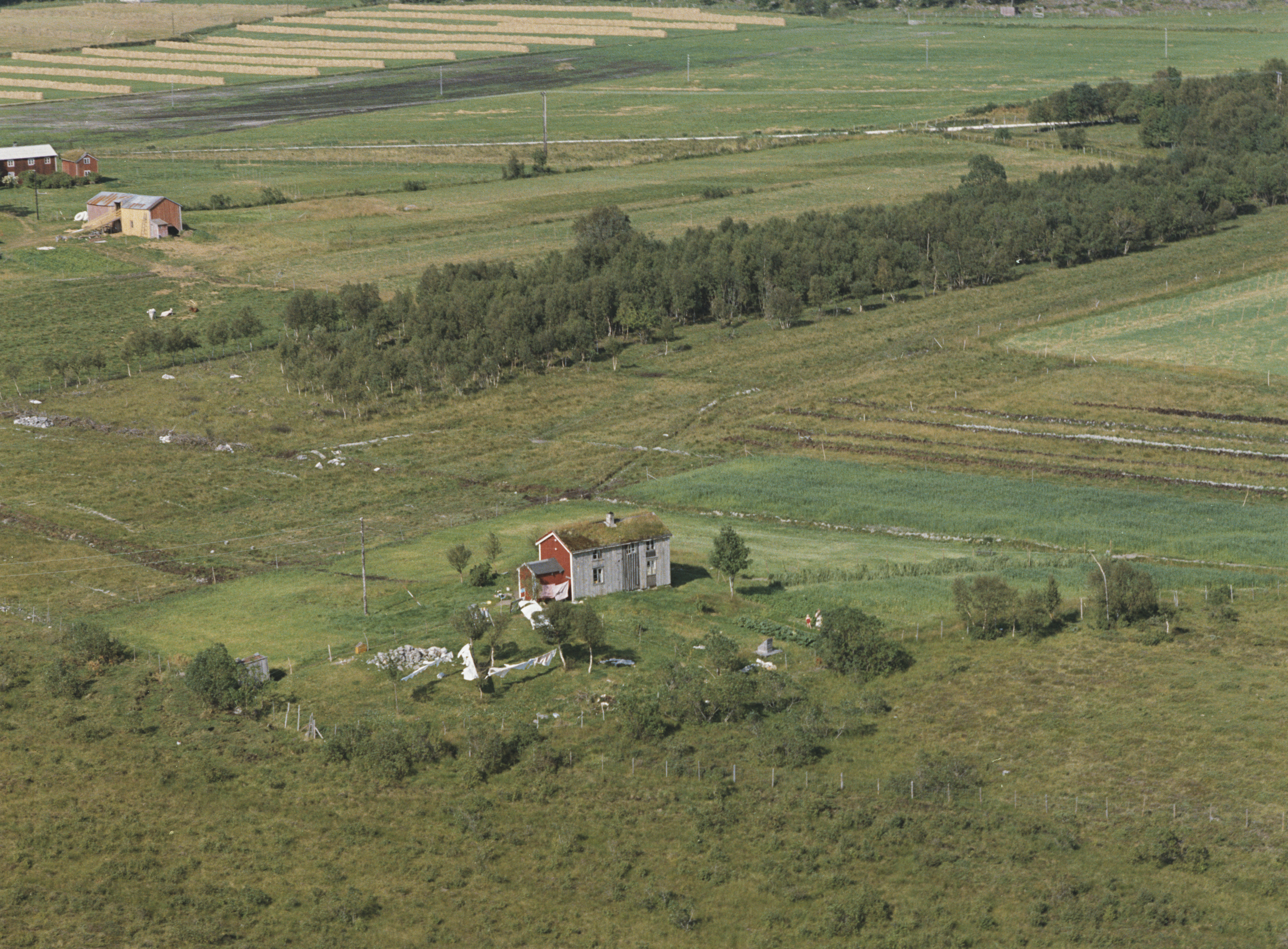

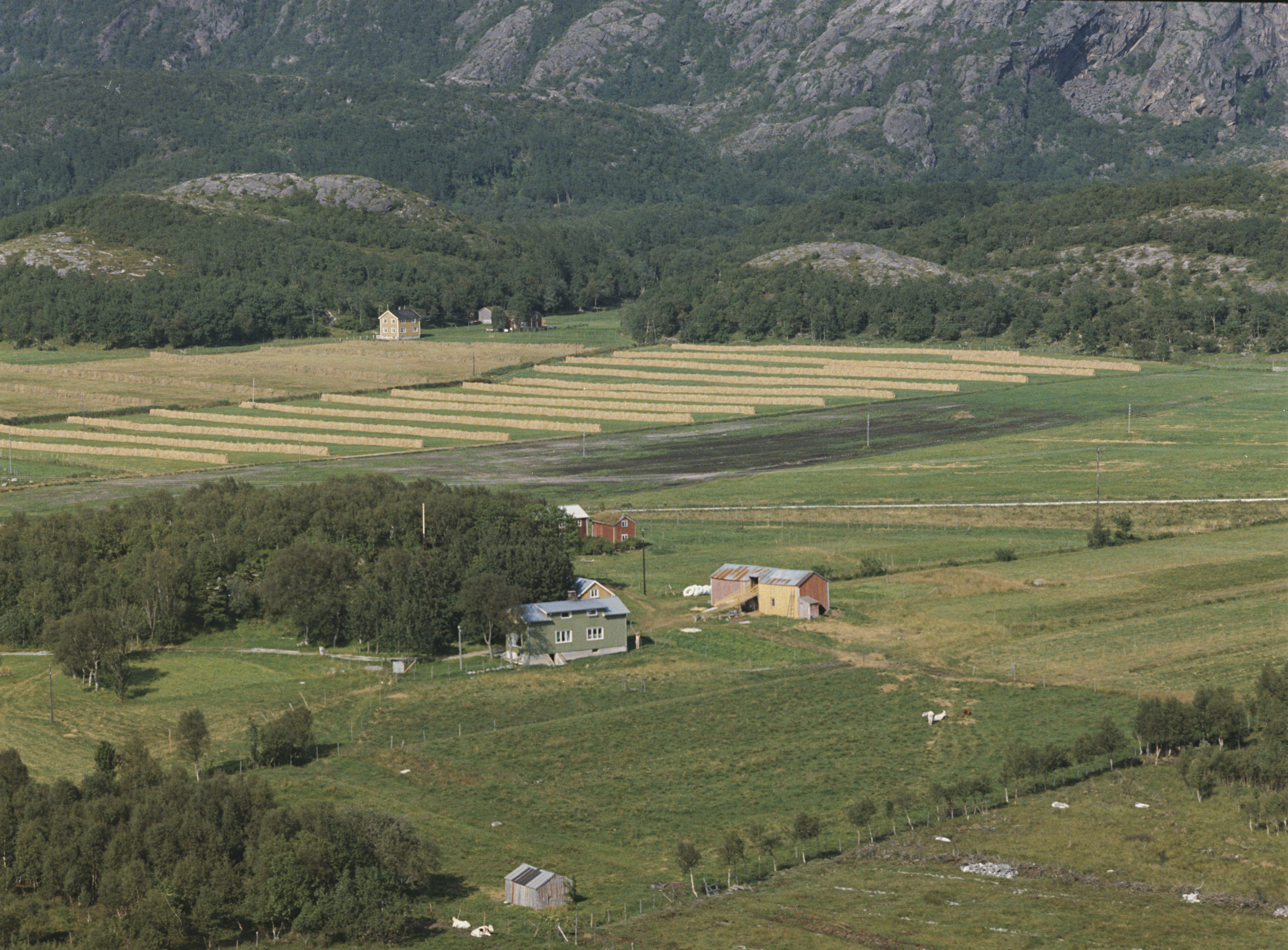

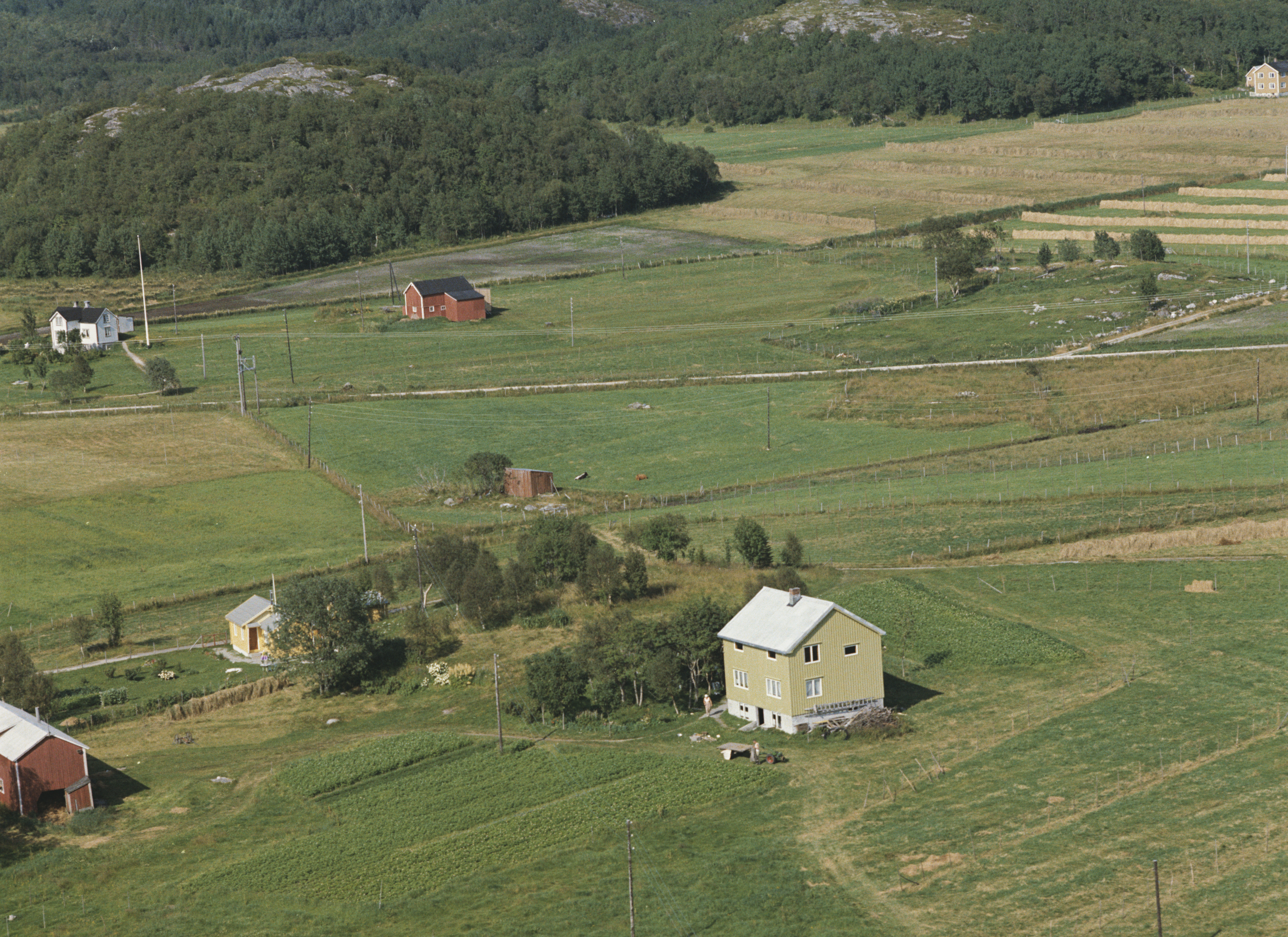

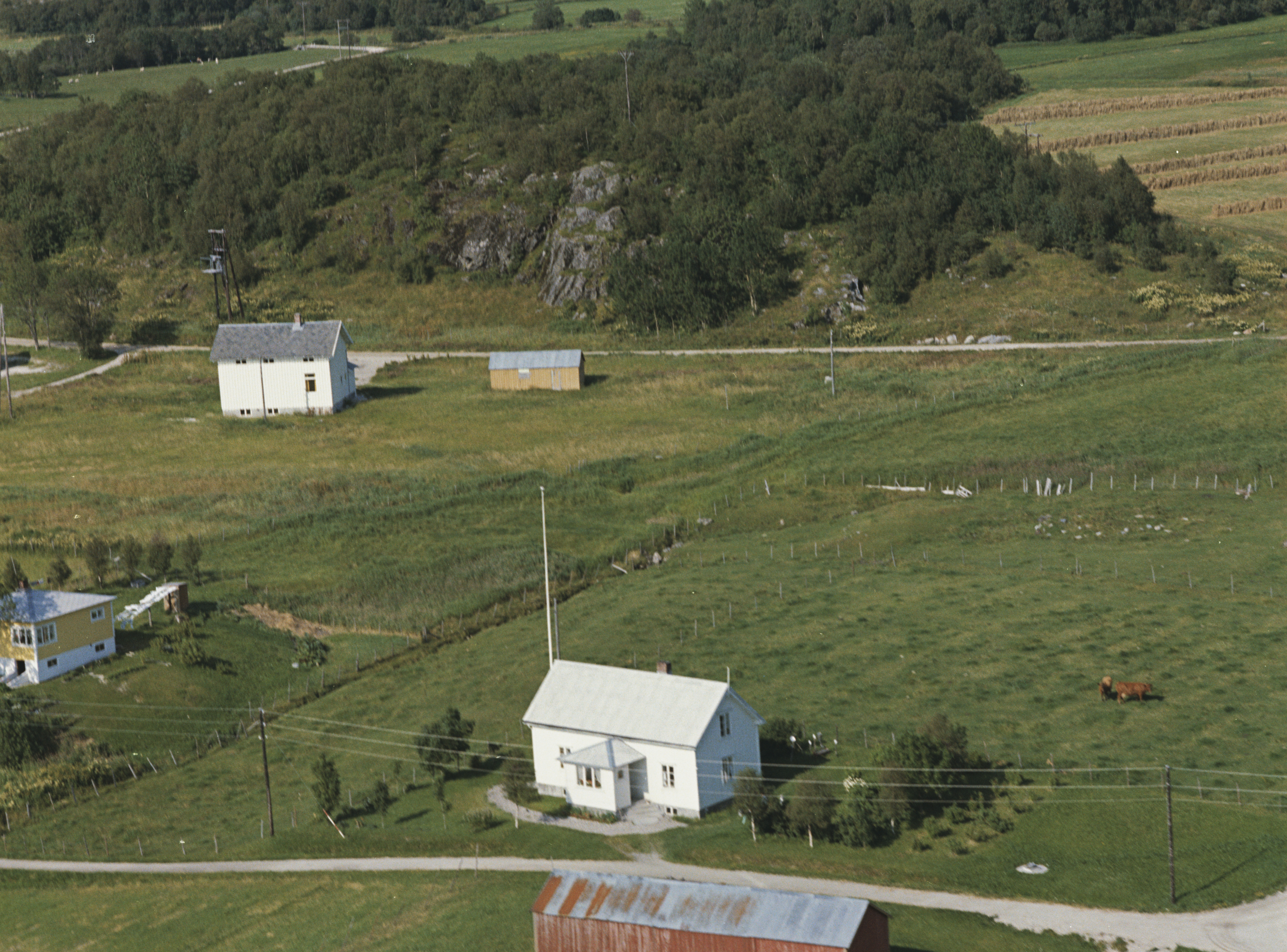

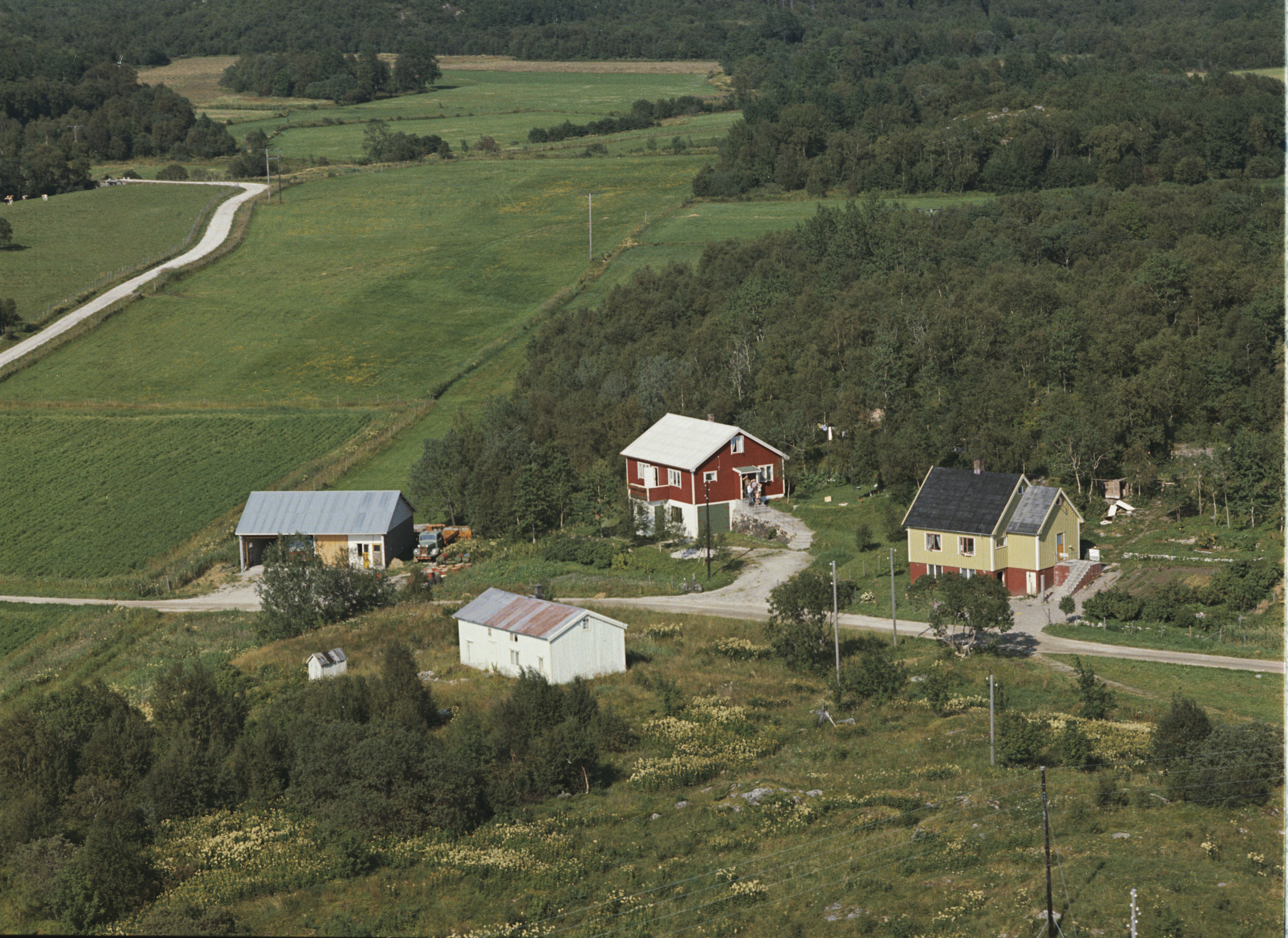

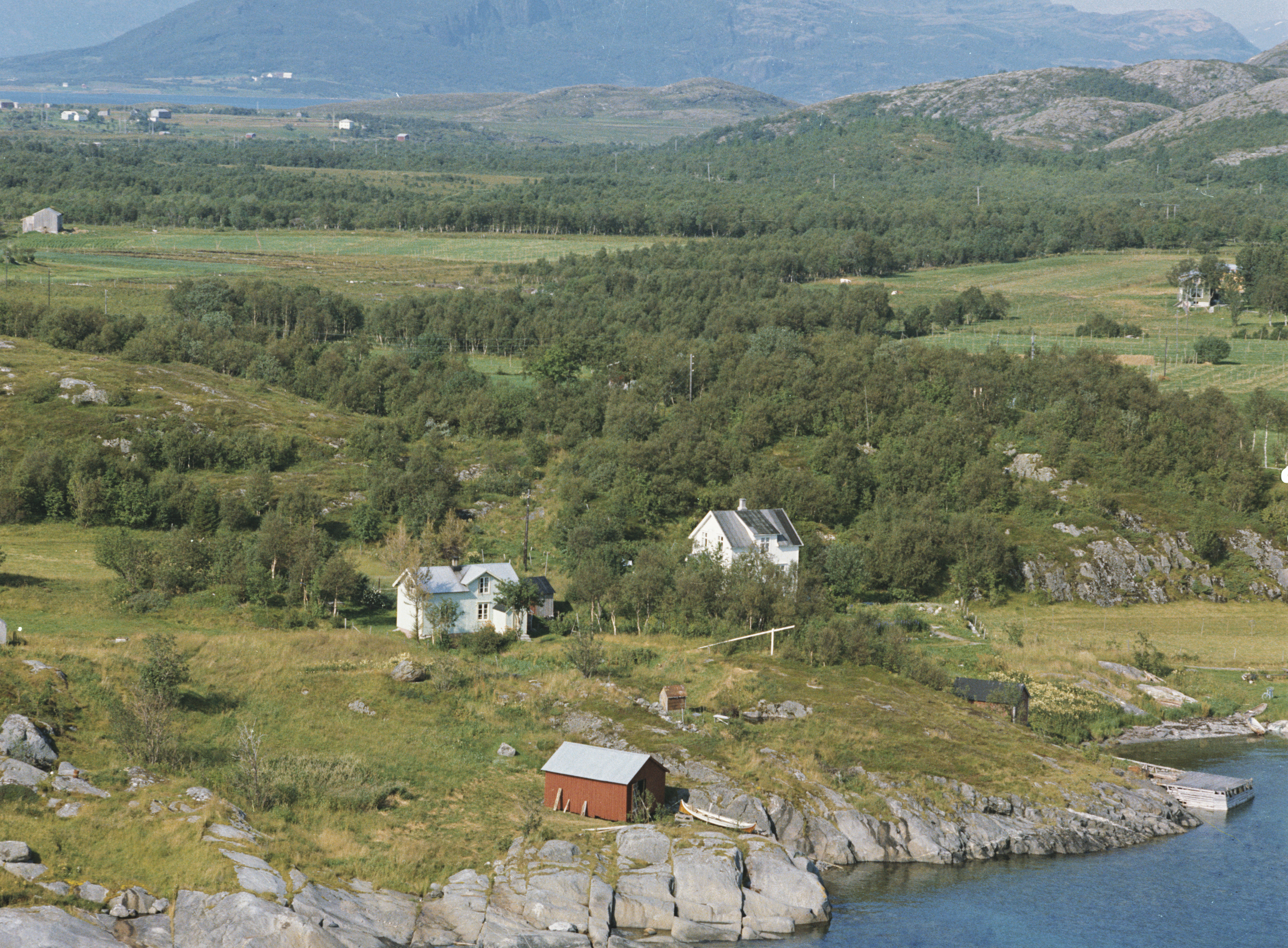

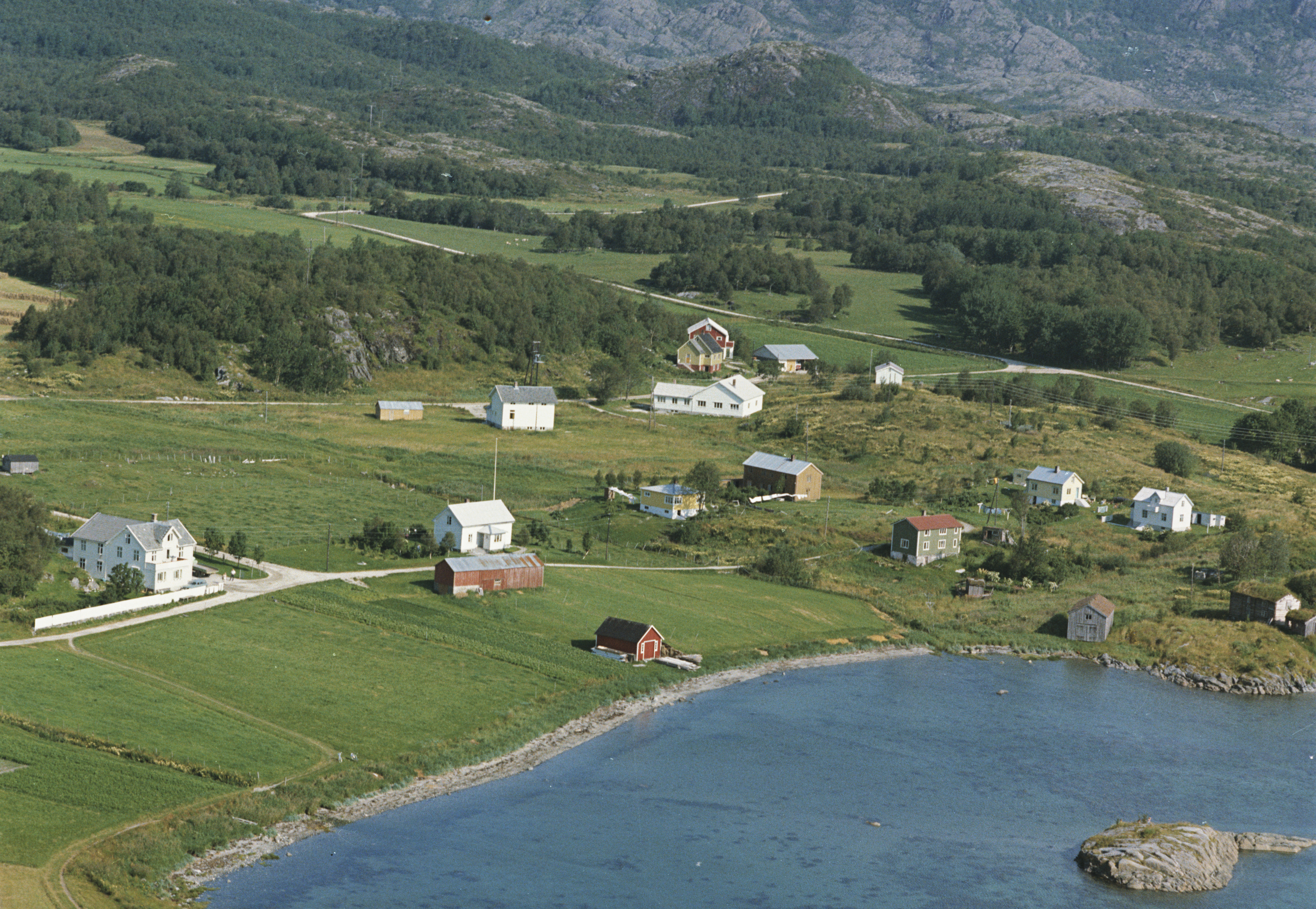

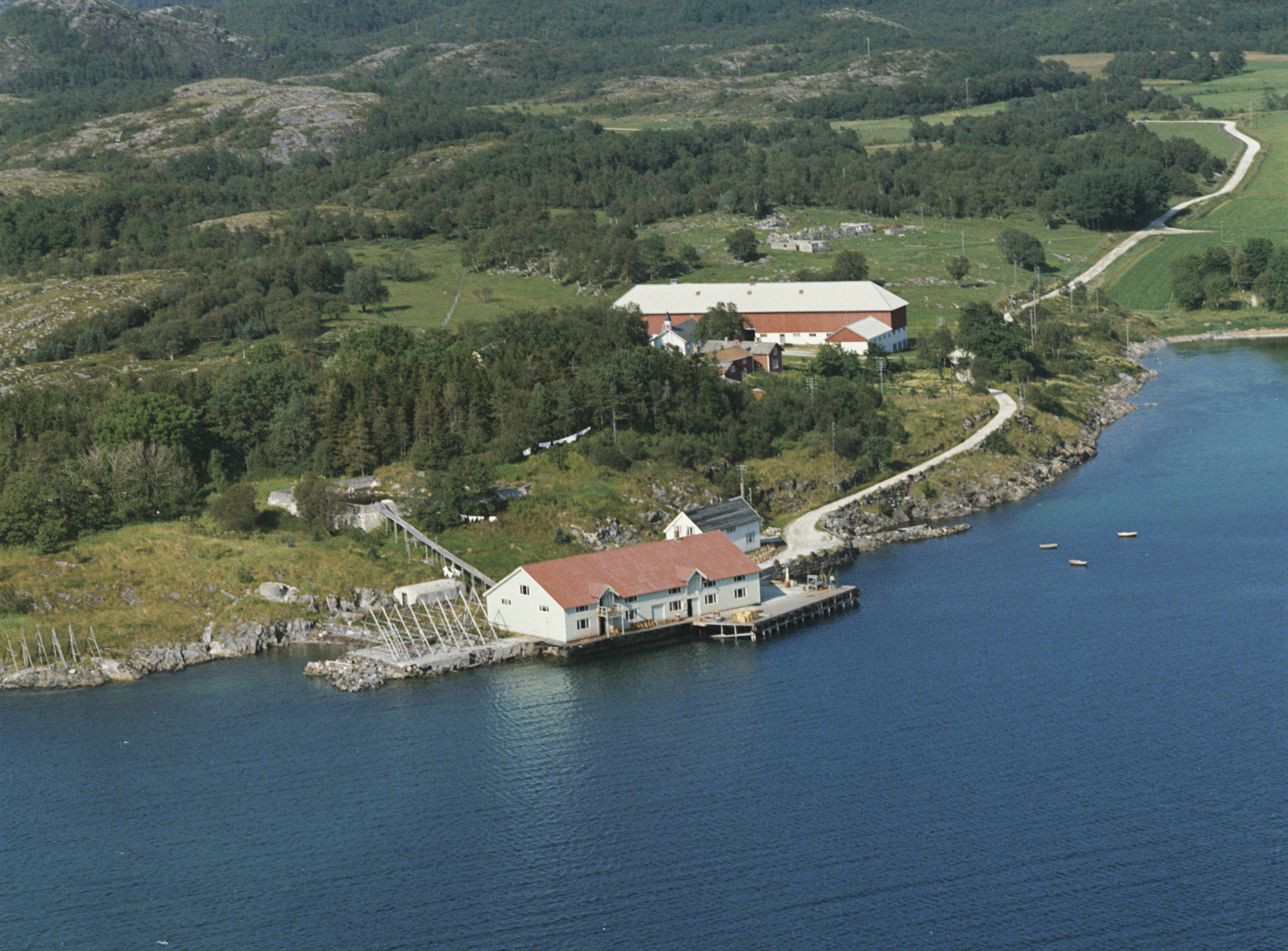

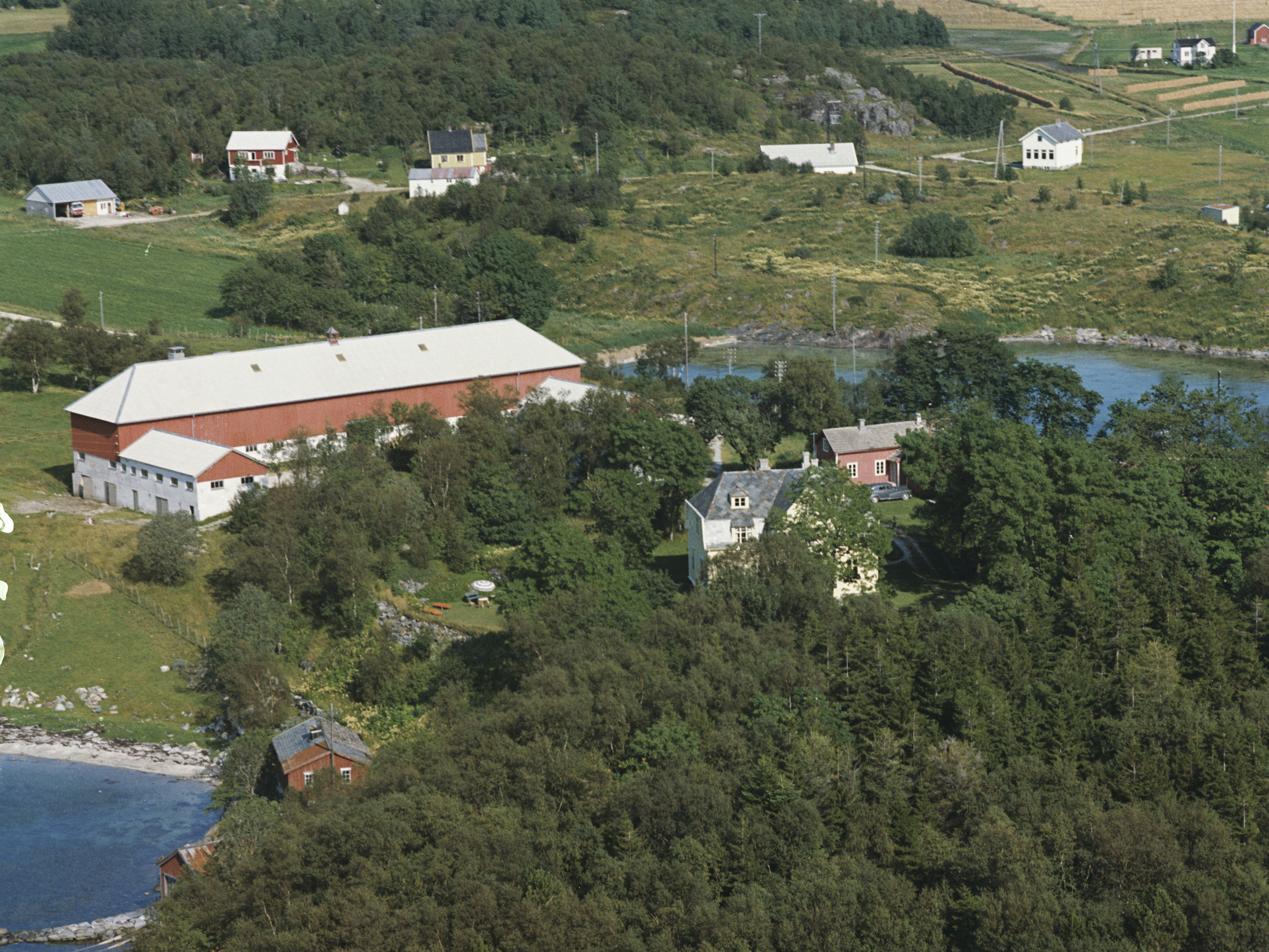

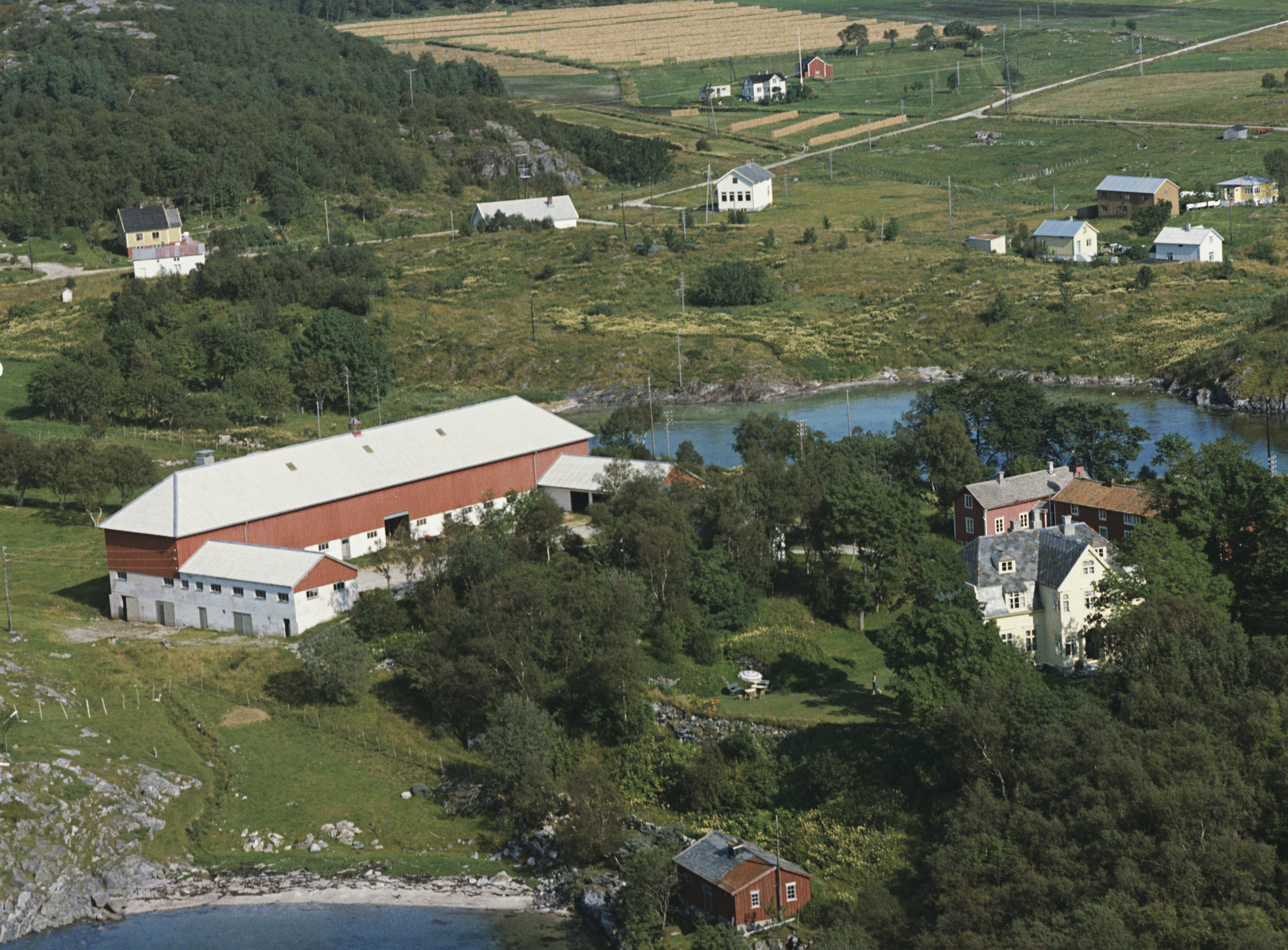
