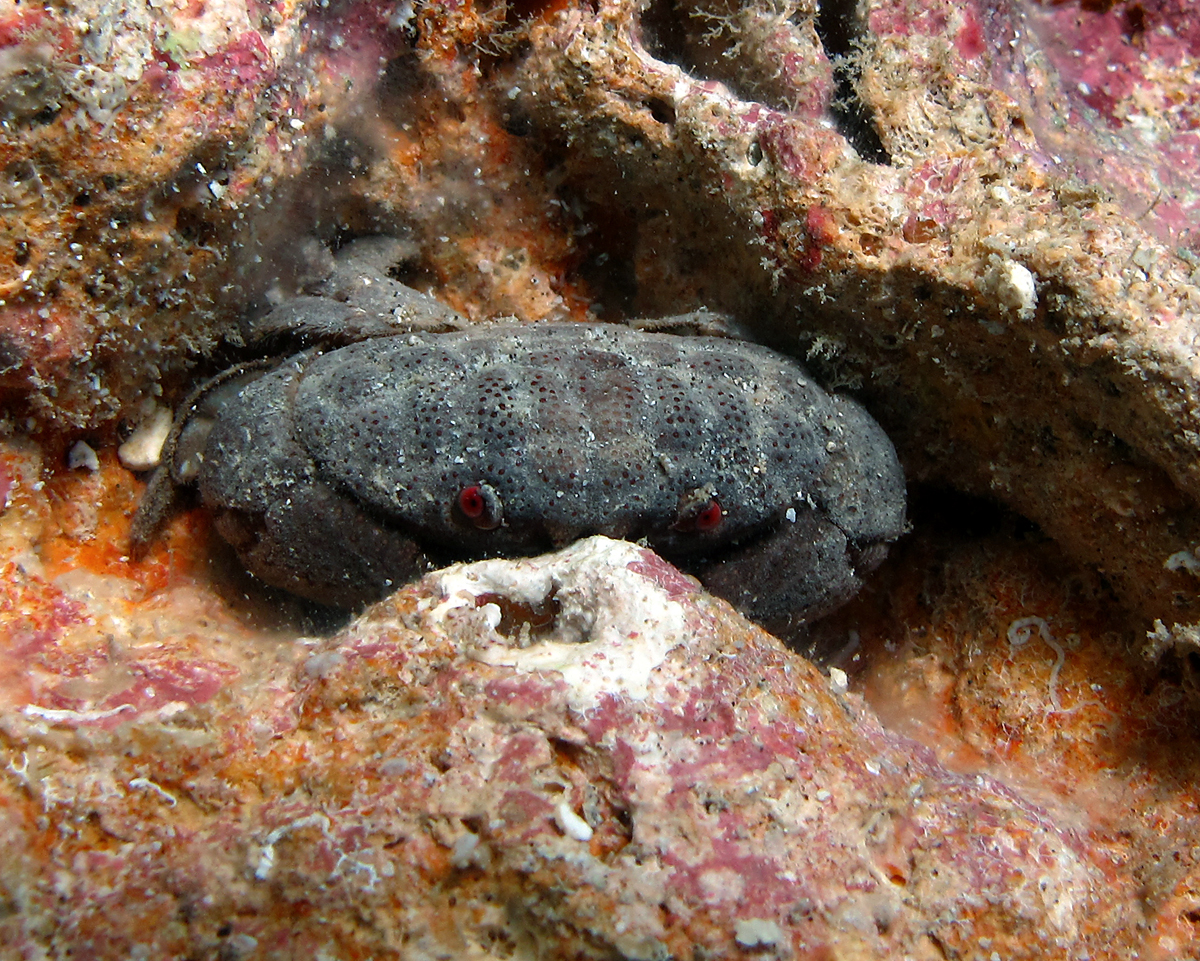
- Actaeodes tomentosus

Scientific classification
- Domain: Eukaryota
- Kingdom: Animalia
- Phylum: Arthropoda
- Class: Malacostraca
- Order: Decapoda
- Suborder: Pleocyemata
- Infraorder: Brachyura
- Family: Xanthidae
- Subfamily: Actaeinae
- Genus: Actaeodes; Dana, 1851

= Actaeodes =

Genus of crabs

Actaeodes is a genus of crabs in the family Xanthidae, containing the following species:

- Actaeodes hirsutissimus (Rüppell, 1830)
- Actaeodes mutatus Guinot, 1976
- Actaeodes ogasawaraensis Takeda & Komatsu, 2024
- Actaeodes quinquelobatus Garth & Kim, 1983
- Actaeodes semoni (Ortmann, 1894)
- Actaeodes tomentosus (H. Milne-Edwards, 1834)
