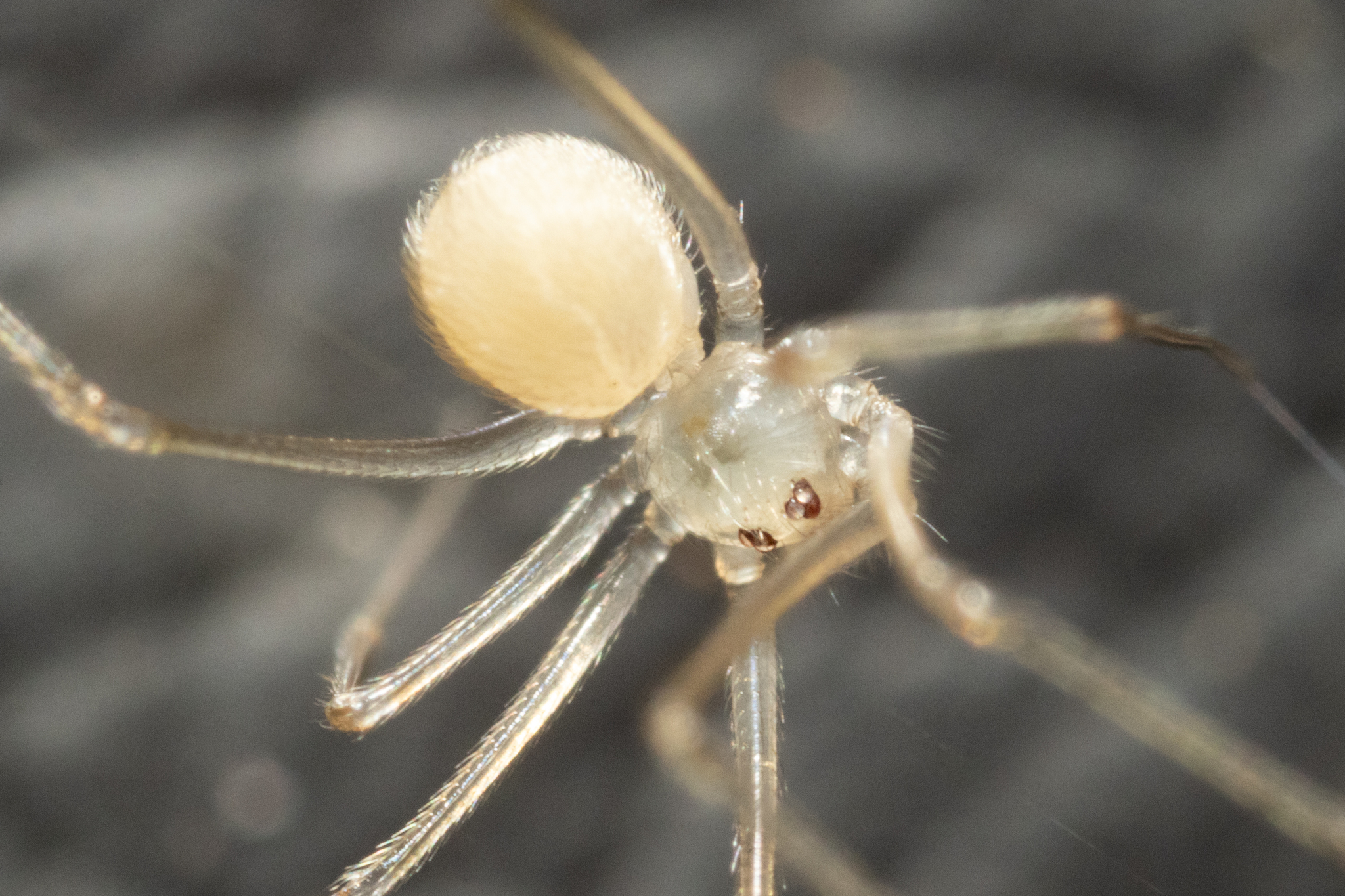
- S. senoculata
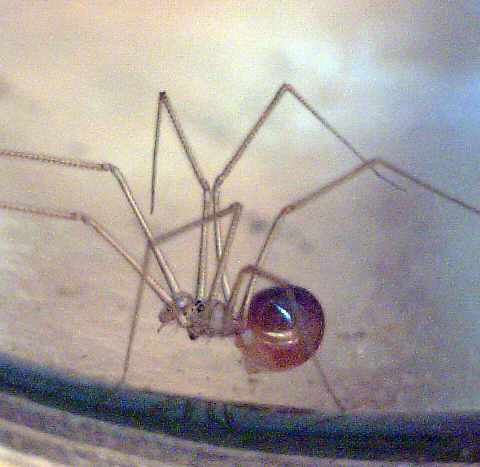
- Male shortbodied cellar spider (Spermophora senoculata) from the United States

Scientific classification
- Kingdom: Animalia
- Phylum: Arthropoda
- Subphylum: Chelicerata
- Class: Arachnida
- Order: Araneae
- Infraorder: Araneomorphae
- Family: Pholcidae
- Genus: Spermophora; Hentz, 1841

Type species
- S. senoculata (Dugès, 1836)

Species
- 45, see text

Synonyms
- Simonius Kishida, 1913

= Spermophora =

Genus of spiders

Spermophora is a genus of cellar spiders that was first described by Nicholas Marcellus Hentz in 1841.

Its species are found in Africa, Europe, Oceania, Asia, the United States, and Brazil.

== Species ==
As of October 2025, this genus includes 45 species:

- Spermophora abibae Huber, 2014 – DR Congo
- Spermophora akwamu Huber & Kwapong, 2013 – Ghana, Gabon
- Spermophora awalai Huber, 2014 – Cameroon
- Spermophora berlandi Fage, 1936 – Kenya
- Spermophora bukusu Huber & Warui, 2012 – Kenya, Uganda
- Spermophora deelemanae Huber, 2005 – Indonesia (Ambon)
- Spermophora dieke Huber, 2009 – Guinea
- Spermophora dumoga Huber, 2005 – Indonesia (Sulawesi)
- Spermophora estebani Simon, 1892 – Philippines
- Spermophora falcata Yao & Li, 2013 – Laos
- Spermophora gordimerae Huber, 2003 – South Africa
- Spermophora jocquei Huber, 2003 – Comoros, Mayotte
- Spermophora kaindi Huber, 2005 – New Guinea
- Spermophora kerinci Huber, 2005 – Indonesia (Sumatra, Bali). Introduced to Britain, Netherlands, Germany, Austria
- Spermophora kirinyaga Huber & Warui, 2012 – Kenya
- Spermophora kivu Huber, 2003 – Congo
- Spermophora kyambura Huber & Warui, 2012 – Cameroon to Uganda
- Spermophora lambilloni Huber, 2003 – Comoros
- Spermophora luzonica Huber, 2005 – Philippines
- Spermophora maathaiae Huber & Warui, 2012 – Kenya
- Spermophora maculata Keyserling, 1891 – Brazil
- Spermophora maros Huber, 2005 – Indonesia (Sulawesi)
- Spermophora masisiwe Huber, 2003 – Tanzania
- Spermophora mau Huber & Warui, 2012 – Kenya
- Spermophora minotaura Berland, 1920 – East Africa
- Spermophora morogoro Huber, 2003 – Tanzania
- Spermophora palau Huber, 2005 – Caroline Is.
- Spermophora paluma Huber, 2001 – Australia (Queensland)
- Spermophora pembai Huber, 2003 – South Africa
- Spermophora peninsulae Lawrence, 1964 – South Africa
- Spermophora persica Senglet, 2008 – Iran
- Spermophora ranomafana Huber, 2003 – Madagascar
- Spermophora sangarawe Huber, 2003 – Tanzania
- Spermophora schoemanae Huber, 2003 – South Africa
- Spermophora senoculata (Dugès, 1836) – Middle East. Introduced to United States, Jamaica, southern Europe, China, Korea, Japan (type species)
- Spermophora senoculatoides Senglet, 2008 – Iran
- Spermophora sumbawa Huber, 2005 – Indonesia (Sunda Islands)
- Spermophora suurbraak Huber, 2003 – South Africa
- Spermophora thorelli Roewer, 1942 – Myanmar
- Spermophora tonkoui Huber, 2003 – Guinea, Ivory Coast
- Spermophora tumbang Huber, 2005 – Borneo
- Spermophora usambara Huber, 2003 – Tanzania
- Spermophora vyvato Huber, 2003 – Madagascar
- Spermophora yao Huber, 2001 – Australia (Queensland)
- Spermophora ziama Huber & Kwapong, 2013 – Guinea

== See also ==
- List of Pholcidae species
