= Husby Chapel =

Church in Nordland, Norway

- Husby kapell
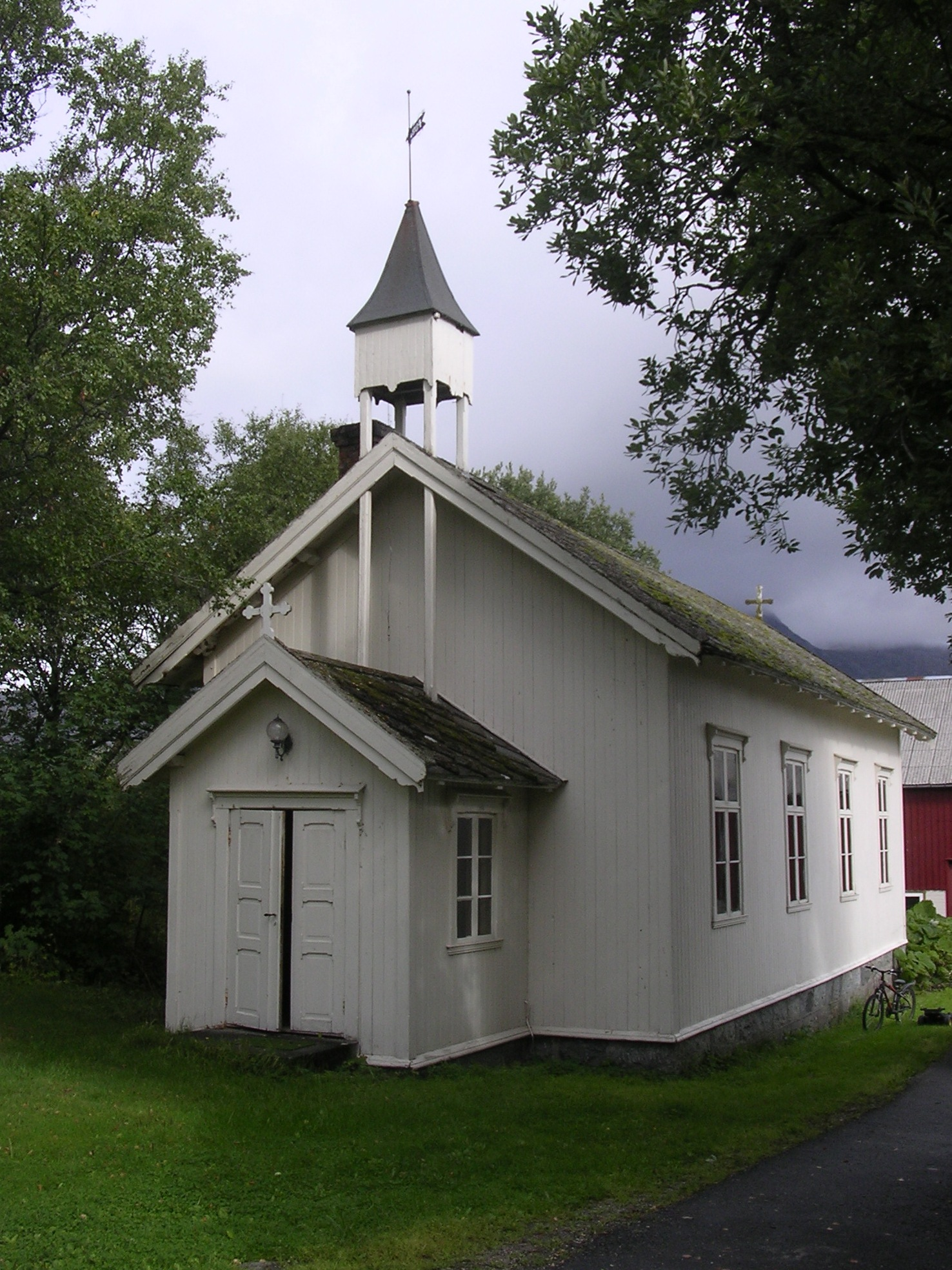
- View of the chapel
- Husby Chapel
- 66.2245888°N 12.7631274°E
- Location: Nesna Municipality, Nordland
- Country: Norway
- Denomination: Church of Norway
- Churchmanship: Evangelical Lutheran

History
- Status: Chapel
- Founded: 1905
- Consecrated: 2 June 1905

Architecture
- Functional status: Active
- Architectural type: Long church
- Completed: 1905 (121 years ago)

Specifications
- Capacity: 60
- Materials: Wood

Administration
- Diocese: Sør-Hålogaland
- Deanery: Nord-Helgeland prosti
- Parish: Nesna
- Norwegian Cultural Heritage Site
- Type: Church
- Status: Not protected
- ID: 84664

Husby Chapel (Norwegian: Husby kapell) is a chapel of the Church of Norway in Nesna Municipality in Nordland county, Norway. It is located in the village of Husby on the southern shore of the island of Tomma. It is an annex chapel in the Nesna parish which is part of the Nord-Helgeland prosti (deanery) in the Diocese of Sør-Hålogaland.

The white, wooden chapel was built in a long church style in 1905 as a private farm chapel for the Husby Estate. The chapel seats about 60 people. It was consecrated on 2 June 1905 as part of the Dønnes Municipality parish and had 4 worship services each year. It was transferred to Nesna Municipality parish in 1962, and since 2005, it has six regularly scheduled worship services each year in addition to special events such as weddings or funerals.

== See also ==
- List of churches in Sør-Hålogaland
