= Eystein Husebye, Jr. =

Norwegian endocrinologist

Eystein Sverre Husebye (born 17 June 1961) is a Norwegian endocrinologist.

He was born in Bergen as a son of seismologist Eystein Sverre Husebye and housewife Hildur née Monsen. He was a grandson of vicar and writer Sverre Daniel Husebye and nephew of chemist Steinar Husebye. Eystein Husebye, Jr. finished his secondary education in 1979 and graduated from the University of Bergen with the cand.med. degree in 1985.

Following a period as a research fellow from 1985 to 1988, he took the dr.med. degree in 1990 with the thesis Stimulus-secretion coupling in chromaffin cells of the bovine adrenal medulla. In between, he performed practical service for his medical degree in Hamar and Steigen, was then a physician at Andøya Air Station from 1990 to 1991 before moving to Sweden. He worked at Linköping University Hospital from 1991 and Uppsala Academic Hospital/University of Uppsala from 1993.

Husebye returned to Bergen as a professor at the University of Bergen and chief physician at Haukeland University Hospital. He was a visiting scholar at Harvard Medical School and head coordinator in Euradrenal, an EU project documenting causes and treatments of Addison's disease.

In 2009 he received an honorary degree from the University of Uppsala. He was inducted into the Norwegian Academy of Science and Letters in 2025.
