= Husby Estate =

Estate in Helgeland, Norway

Husby Farm is located on the island Tomma. Illustration: Commons user Finnrid

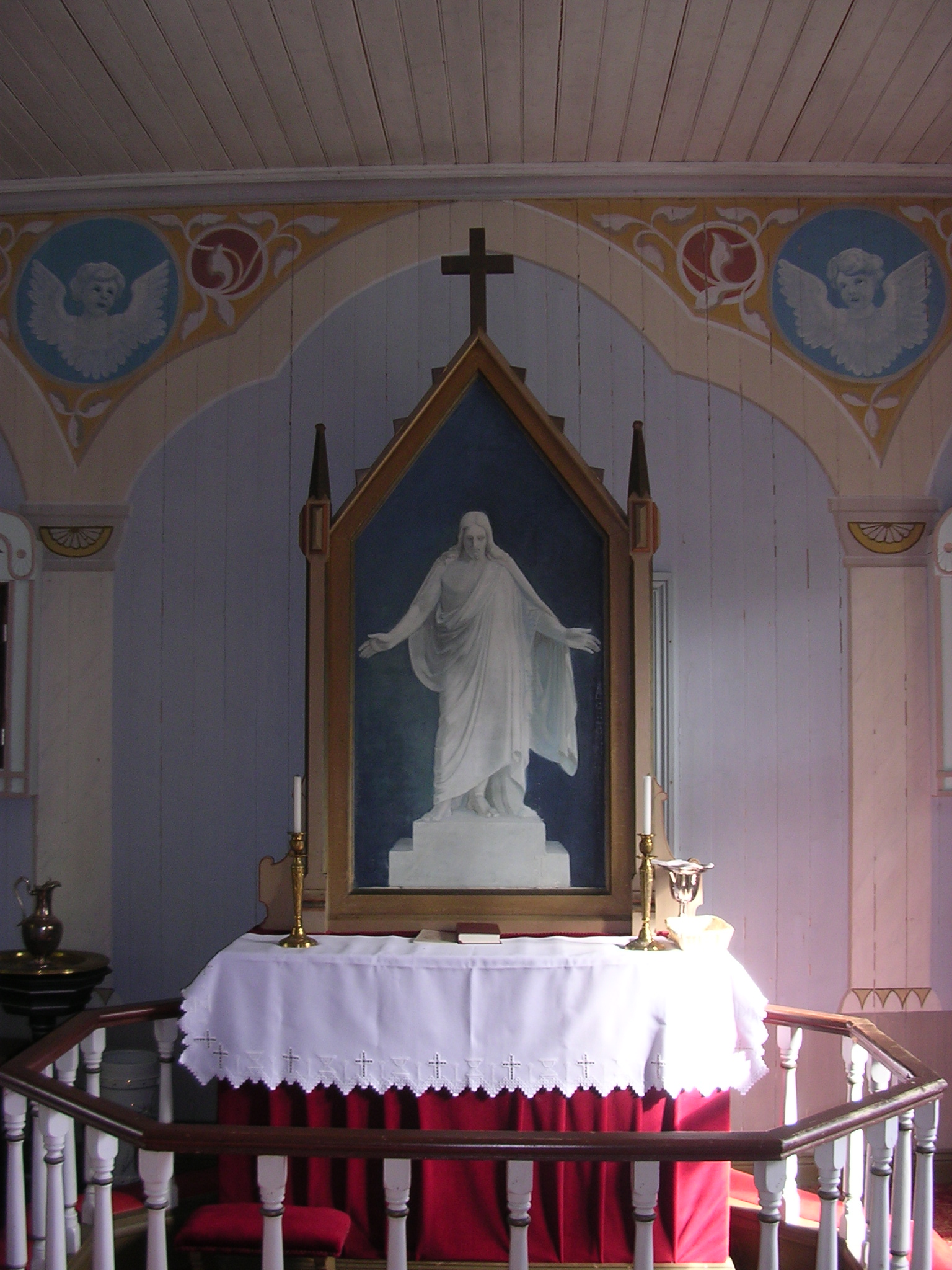
Interior of Husby Chapel, which was built on the command of proprietarian Nathalie Gidtske as a gift to the local community. Photograph: Commons user Finnrid

The Husby Estate (Norwegian: Husbygodset) is an estate in Helgeland, Norway. It is based in the village of Husby on the southwestern part of the island of Tomma in what is now Nesna Municipality.

== History ==
=== Christensen family ===
Anders Christensen the younger (1751–1821), a shipper and a tradesman, and otherwise a great-great-grandson of the noblewoman Margrete Jonsdotter Benkestok, started in 1806 buying properties in the parish of Lurøy. He bought altogether twelve parts of the farms Grønningen, Kvitvær, Lunderøy, Måsvær, Sandvær, Sengstrag, Sør-Nesøy, and Trolløy. In 1819 he bought a part of Husby Farm, which until then had been a part of the Dønnes Estate.

After Christensen's death his widow Anna Catharine née Bernhoft continued buying properties. In 1825 she bought a total of nine properties on farms in the parishes of Meløy, Rødøy, and Lurøy. In 1833, she bought twelve properties on farms in Lurøy. In 1834 she bought a lot of land in the parish of Træna. Later followed the purchases of the trade seat Lurøysjøen, the trade seat Lauvøya, and Åkvik Farm.

Their son Frederik Christian Bernhoft Christensen (1800–1869) took over the Husby Estate. He was succeeded by his son Anders Christensen the younger (1840–1901). Anders Christensen married Johanne Marie Coldevin, the daughter of Isaach Coldevin, who was the owner of the considerably bigger Dønnes Estate. With her were 67 farm properties added to the Husby Estate. The estate thereby grew to consist of approximately 190 farm properties, making it a medium-sized estate in Northern Norway.

The couple's two daughters, Frederikke Christiane Christensen (1867–1887) and Jørgine Catharine Christensen (1872), did not reach adult age, wherefore the estate stood without heirs. Johanne Marie Christensen died in ca. 1895. In 1899, the widower Anders Christensen married Nathalie née Finchenhagen (1873–1955). Anders Christensen died in 1901, whereupon the widow inherited the estate. Nathalie had the Husby Chapel built to serve the local population in 1905.

=== Gidtske family ===
In 1910 Nathalie Christensen married Karl Olaf Johan Karlsen Gidtske (1865–1948), a priest and a cand.theol., who thereby became the owner of the Husby Estate. During his time as a property owner, some of the estate's many farms were sold, partly voluntarily and partly due to forced cession. When their son Kaare Krey Gidtske (1912–1995) took over the estate in 1944, it had been reduced to about 50–60 farm properties (from the original 190). Regardless of the large decrease in size, Gidtske continued selling land. In 1974, Gidtske even sold the Husby Farm, the namesake farm for the estate.

The son of Kaare Gidtske and Kirsten née Jacobsen (1923–2009), Karl Gidtske the younger, is today's estate owner and as such one of the biggest landowners in the County of Nordland.

In the 2000s, some properties belonging to the estate were sold out of the family. Kaare Gidtske's widow, Kirsten Gidtske, would not accept this, wherefore she in 2007 used her right of preemption and bought the properties back for 5,500,000 kr. To the newspaper Rana Blad she stated that she had bought the properties so that they shall remain within the family.

== See also ==
- List of Norwegian estates
