= Eystein Husebye =

Norwegian seismologist

Eystein Sverre Husebye (9 February 1937 – 10 November 2025) was a Norwegian seismologist.

He was born in Sulitjelma as a son of vicar and writer Sverre Daniel Husebye. He was also a brother of chemist Steinar Husebye. He finished his secondary education in 1955 and graduated from the University of Bergen with the cand.real. degree in 1962.

Husesbye was a research fellow at the University of Bergen, Uppsala University and MIT, and took PhD degrees at the Uppsala University in 1972 and the University of Oslo in 1976.

He worked as research director at NORSAR from 1968 to 1993 and adjunct professor at the University of Oslo from 1979 to 1990. He was then a professor of seismology at the University of Bergen from 1993 to his retirement. He was inducted into the Norwegian Academy of Science and Letters in 1987. International, he was among others Norway's representative in the International Union of Geodesy and Geophysics from 1982 to 1988.

Marrying Hildur Monsen in 1960, their son Eystein Husebye, Jr. became a doctor of medicine. Husebye died in November 2025 in Bergen.
