= Västra Husby =

- Location within Östergötland Location within Sweden
- Coordinates: 58°30′N 16°10′E
- Country: Sweden
- Province: Östergötland
- County: Östergötland County
- Municipality: Söderköping Municipality

Area
  - Total: 0.39 km^{2} (0.15 sq mi)

Population (31 December 2010)
  - Total: 486
  - Density: 1,241/km^{2} (3,210/sq mi)
- Time zone: UTC+1 (CET)
  - Summer (DST): UTC+2 (CEST)

Västra Husby is a locality situated in Söderköping Municipality, Östergötland County, Sweden with 486 inhabitants in 2010. There are many places in Sweden called Husby, making it easily mixed up with the suburb in the capital Stockholm.
