= Johan Augustinussen =

Norwegian Church singer, teacher and politician (1808–1888)

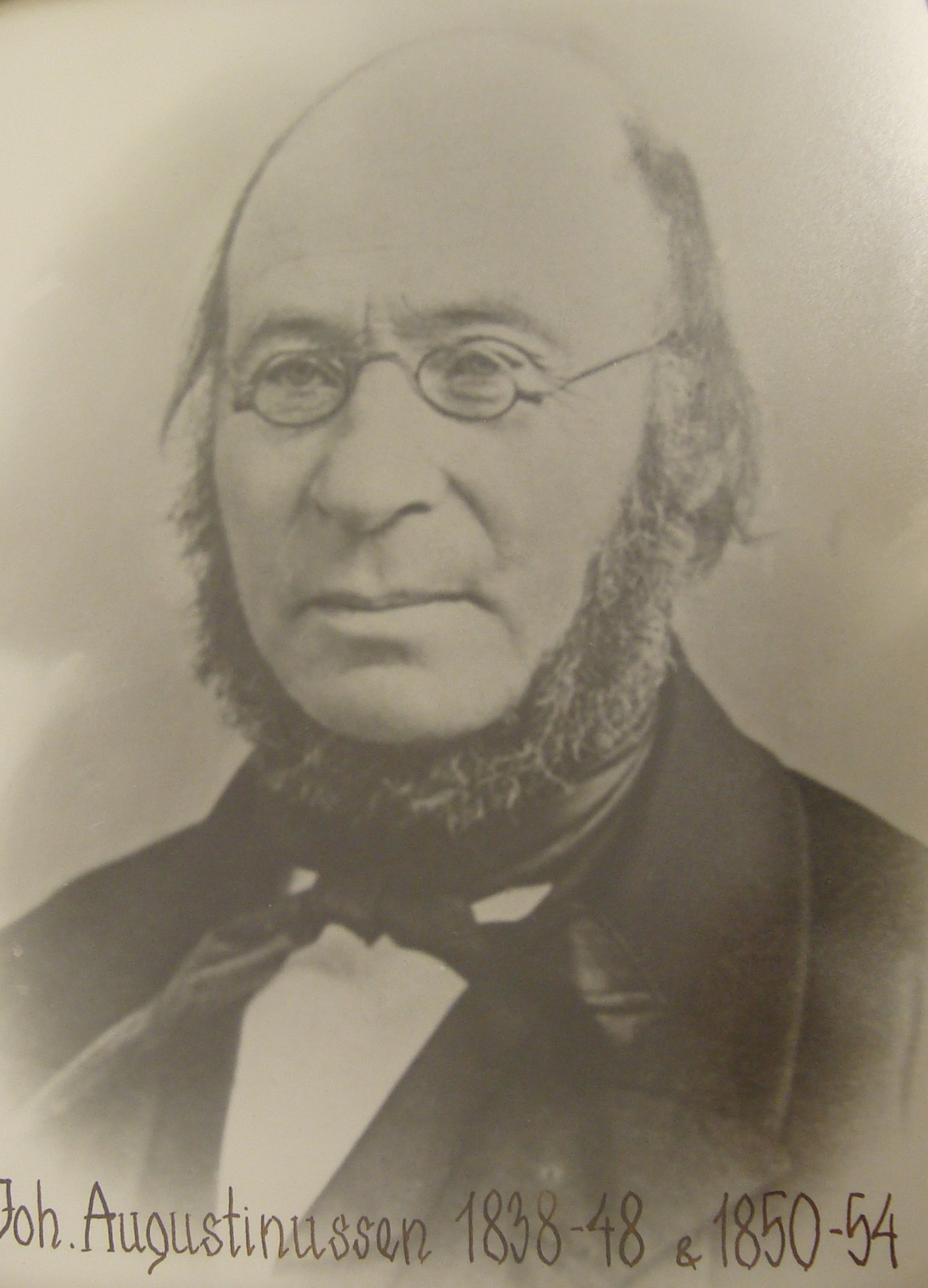

Personal details
- Born: 10 May 1808
- Died: 22 November 1888 (aged 80)

Johan Augustinussen, also written Augustiniussen, (born 10 May 1808 at Langset in Nesna Municipality, died 22 November 1888 in Nesna) was a Norwegian curate/choirmaster, teacher and politician.

Despite a lack of formal education, straight after his confirmation he was appointed as the communal school teacher in his native village of Nesna, and at the young age of 22, he was employed as the village's teacher and choirmaster, a position he held for almost 50 years. He also wrote poems and folk songs, and was very interested in music.

Johan Augustinussen became the first mayor of Nesna in 1838. He was mayor for a total of 14 years. He also held a number of other positions in the local community, and represented the county of Nordland in parliament for eight terms from 1848 to 1870. Only Sivert Nielsen sat more terms in the Storting for Nordland county during the 19th century. He was politically aligned with the farmer's alliance, led by Ole Gabriel Ueland. Initially, like Ueland, he supported Søren Jaabæk and Johan Sverdrup, but Augustinussen sympathized more with central parties after a while, as Jaabæk and Sverdrup moved in a more radical direction.

== Childhood and adolescence ==
Johan Augustinussen was born at "Oppigården" in Langset, a farm in Sjona some distance east of the village of Nesna. His parents were Augustinius Larssøn (1762–1815) and Kirstine Olsdatter (1770–1843). His paternal grandfather Lars Johnsen (1720–1767) was a farmer at Sandnes in Nesna, and his maternal grandfather Peder Tønder (1697–1735) had been a lensmann. Augustinius Larssøn was an enterprising fisherman; he owned, among others, both a færing and a six-oared row boat, many fishing nets and longlines, and also rorbu in Kabelvåg. His estate testified to his wealth, especially by the standards at the time, since in addition to the aforementioned boats, he also owned nine cows, a horse and a windmill. Local historian Øyvind Jenssen describes him as a man of "great reputation in the village", for example, he was one of the chosen parishioners who signed the authorization of the electors from Nesna for the Norwegian Constituent Assembly (Riksforsamlingen) in 1814.

Johan was the youngest of seven siblings, but only he and Ole, the brother four years older than him, reached adulthood. Johan's father died in 1815, and his mother remarried in 1816 with Møller Andersen Zahl from Handnes who was 20 years her younger. Johan's mother died in 1843, and Zahl remarried in 1845 with Anne Pedersdatter from Handnesøya. Jenssen describes her as a warm and good person who Johan had a good relationship with.

Johan Augustinussen showed little interest in farm work, showing instead a great interest in books. In one of the neighbor's living rooms at Langset, many books were to be found, and he often buried himself among them in order to read. It was said that he was a "lazybones" when it came to farm work, and he could not be counted on either during the harvest when he was in charge of cooking the porridge inside. He would sit on a wooden box and lose himself in his reading, not realizing that the porridge was burning. According to Jenssen however, the people surrounding hims were aware of his literary abilities at an early age, and the parish priest Jens Andreas Krogh "became interested in the bright boy and began to lend him books".

== Local offices ==
=== Teacher and choirmaster ===
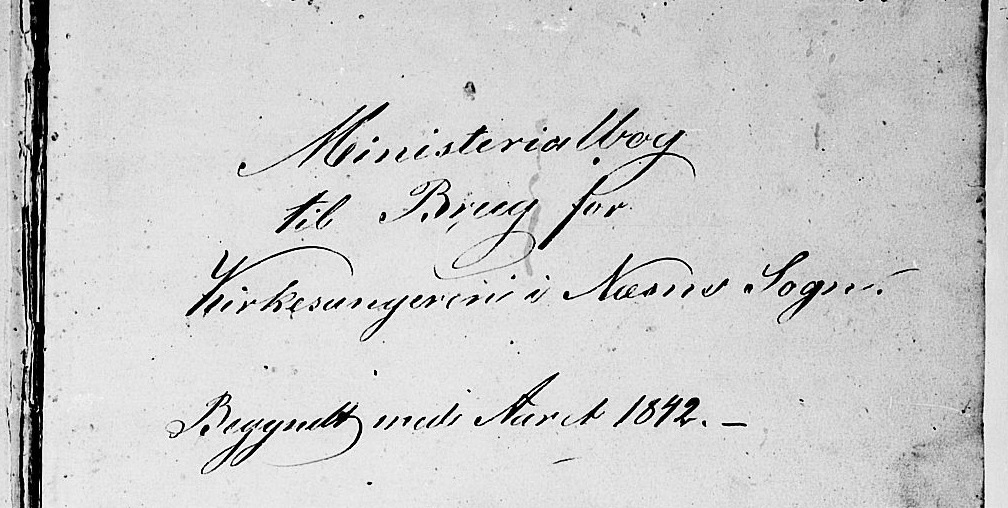
Title page from the parish register of Nesna pastors from 1842. In neat handwriting: Ministerial book for use by choirmasters in Nesna parish. Began 1842.

The condition of education in Nesna at the beginning o the 19th century was described as "lamentable". The education Augustinussen himself had received had mainly been from home and through the priest who lent him books. When he was asked in parliament where he studied, he answered: "Actually I ought to tell you that I was taught at home next to the stove by my mother". It was the curate who was responsible for teaching, and Nesna had been saddled with several awful curates. The curate Müller, in 1811, had to resign his post "due to adultery", and his successor Peter Eggen, who was curate during Augustinussen's childhood and early years, had little more success. He was a cobbler without any pedagogical qualifications and liked to drink and "chase women". Jenssen writes that "he had nothing to teach + for the simple reason that he knew nothing". The pastor at the time Christian Qvale testified that "He combined lewdness with the greatest incompetence" ., whilst the later priest Dometius wrote of Eggen that «Han cultivated both Bacchus and Venus and was a general annoyance".

This was the reason that despite a lack of schooling, straight after his confirmation, Augustinussen was employed as the communal school teacher by pastor Krogh. The communal school was meant to be preparation for regular school, where children would learn "how to read" and "the understanding of words". From 1826 he was also a home tutor for pastor Krogh's children. Here he was given access to Krogh's relatively rich library. The regular school in Nesna was built in 1823, 37 years before the common school law of 1860 demanded that schools of more than 30 pupils needed their own school building. It was tradition that the curate was the teacher there. Peter Eggen was finally suspended from his position as curate in 1829 and died the same year. When the curate position became available, Augustinussen was appointed in 1830, at the young age of 22. The curate was also called "choirmaster", and this title was used for Augustinussen among others in connection with parliament. He had this position until he became a pensioner in 1878, thus serving for almost 50 years. He was a member of the school commission for the same time period, and also led confirmation education when the priest was too busy. Anton Christian Bang said about this that "his gifted and lively teaching was characterized by seriousness without any expressed warmth".

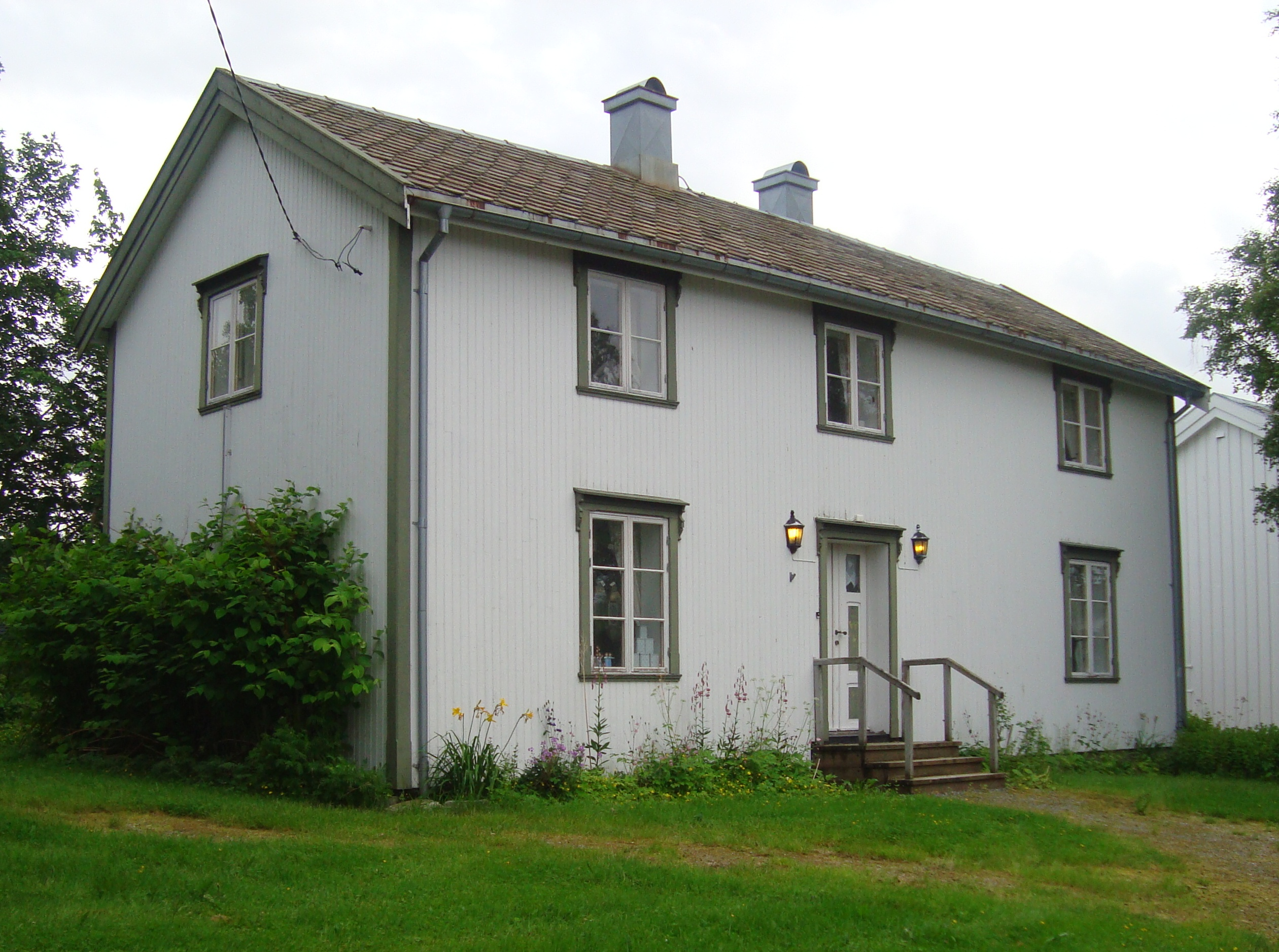
Nesna's first school building built in 1823. It was Augustinussen's workplace and home from 1830 to 1878. Credit: Finn Rindahl

As choirmaster, Augustinussen was entitled to a municipal curate's farm at Sandenes at the end of Ranfjorden. However, he chose to live in a cramped apartment in the school building. The school building was in 1856 (after renovations in 1853) 20.5 by 9 ells. On the ground floor were the teaching room, kitchen and parlor for the curate, while the rooms on the first floor were used for housing. Originally there was a dormitory in the attic for pupils who lived far away. It was used as a school building up until 1886, and then became housing for the curate. After becoming a pensioner in 1878, Augustinussen built himself a private residential block on the west wall of the teaching room where he lived for the rest of his life. This house has since been moved a little away. Both the schoolhouse and Augustinussen's house still stand at Nesna. The schoolhouse is considered to be "the region's oldest building for permanent, organized teaching for the common people".

When Augustinussen was curate, Jens Andreas Krogh was pastor in Nesna. In 1841 he was succeeded by Georg Greve, who was priest up until 1850 when Rasmus Dometius overtook the position and in 1866 Dometius was succeeded byHenning Stub. Stub and Augustinussen both resigned in 1878, but according to Jenssen "paradoxically, most the attention surrounded the curate".

Johan Augustinussen left deep traces within the school system in Nesna, managing to extend both the school hours and curriculum. Jenssen refers to Augustinussen's teaching career as "a teaching act that both in quality and quantity made a major and positive impact on the development of Nesna".

=== Mayor ===
The Formannskap laws were passed in 1837 and effective from 1 January 1838. Each prestegjeld would constitute a formannskap (formannskapsdistrikt). The prestegjeld in Nesna consisted at that time of Nesna and Dønnes sockens, and Johan Augustinussen was one of the three members in the first formannskap in Nesna. The other two were Johan Abrahamsen from Nesna and Johan Friderich Buch from Dønnes. The minutes from the first formannskap meeting are brief:

On 8 July 1838 were the undersigned members of the formannskap for Nesna prestegjeld gathered to choose a mayor; to which Choirmaster Johan Augustinussen was elected, and to the position of Vice mayor Johan Abrahamsen was elected for Nesna.
Thus is witnessed by [Signed Johan Augustinussen, Johan Abrahamsen, Johan Friderich Buch]

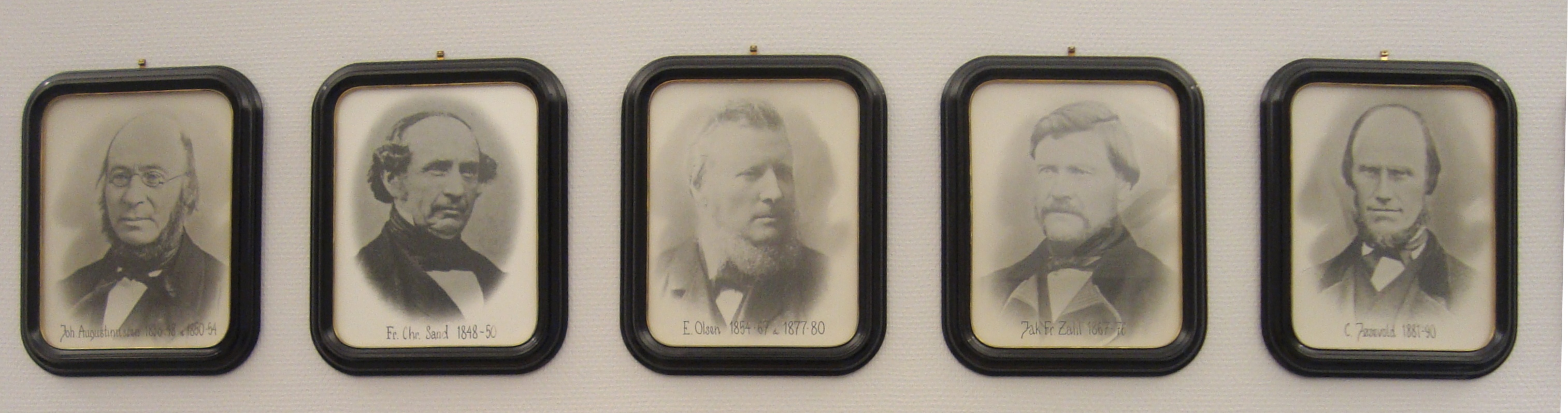
From the mayoral gallery in the municipal hall in Nesna. As first mayor Augustinussen is furthest to the left in the picture. The next four are Fredrik Christian Sand, Elias Olsen, Jacob Fredrik Zahl and Carl Jøsevold.

Augustinussen had since 1830 been a teacher and choirmaster, and in that capacity also a member of the school commission. In 1835 The Medicinal Journal for Helgeland reported that he had also been engaged as an assistant to the district doctor Johan Friederich Winther in the vaccinating against smallpox. He was 30 years old when he was elected as mayor, and was mayor of Nesna for terms, from 1838 to 1848 and from 1850 to 1854. Only two subsequent mayors of Nesna, Elias Olsen and Arne Langset, have served for an equivalent period. During his first term, the mayoral office was considered an office of trust; the herred often made decisions on the wording, but "it is left to the mayor to make them necessary". This is also shown as the herred was summoned for the first time on 20 October 1839, fifteen months after the mayoral election. The mayor did not seem important enough to take a person out of work unnecessarily.

=== Municipal treasuries ===
The confidence in Augustinussen was strongly expressed during his first term as mayor, since he also "worked as the municipality's administrator". It was an old practice that the village's pastor would manage the poor relief fund and the municipal treasury, but when Krogh left Nesna in 1841, the formannskap agreed to a different arrangement. Johan Augustinussen was employed as treasurer with responsibilities for the poor relief fund, with a wage of two Spd. per year. He was also responsible for the school treasury in Nesna (but not Dønnes) with a wage of one Spd. per year. This agreement was made by the formannskap where Augustinussen was himself one of the three members, but according to Jenssen no one saw "anything suspicious about this". Jenssen further notes that Augustinussen's accounts were always in "exemplary order" in contrast to the accounts of the school treasury in Dønnes, for which he was not responsible. The wage increased over the years, and in 1876 he received 30 Spd. per year for the supervision of the poor relief fund. Augustinussen was the municipal treasurer until he became a pensioner in 1878; when previous mayor Jacob Fredrik Zahl overtook the position. Zahl was succeeded by Ivar Anton Ivarsen Mehus in 1883, who was also a successor of Augustinussen in a different capacity in 1884, when he became Nesna's second parliamentary representative.

=== Librarian and other duties ===
Nesna had had a semi-public book collection, and according to Axel Coldevin a people's book collection was established for Nesna Municipality and Hemnes Municipality in 1814 after an initiative from bishop Krogh. In 1839, the herred decided to establish a "Common Library for Nesna Prestegjeld". Krogh was appointed as supervisor and accountant of the library, which was actually no more than a collection of book-chests. In 1841 Augustinussen took over the responsibility and arranged loans from the curate's farm until 1865. In 1844 he stated that the collection consists of 33 new and 88 "ancient" books.

Lindstøl states that Augustinussen was post master in Nesna for 14 years. (Note: Med 14 år mener Lindstøl perioden fra 1843 til 1857.) "Nesna post office" was established by order in council on 28 July 1842. It is uncertain whether Augustinussen was the first post master; he is mentioned in the post master minutes from 1843 with the title "choirmaster". He was formally appointed as post master on 19 November 1851. From 1 July 1857, the main post office was moved to the port of call for steamers at Vikholmen just east of the island of Hugla, and the same day the trader Lars Aagaard Meyer succeeded Augustinussen as post master. The yearly wage for the post master was 4 Spd. in 1842; in 1857 it was increased to 24 Spd.

Augustinussen was concilliation commissioner for 49 years. He also had some local duties after he retired in 1878.

== Member of parliament ==
=== Election ===
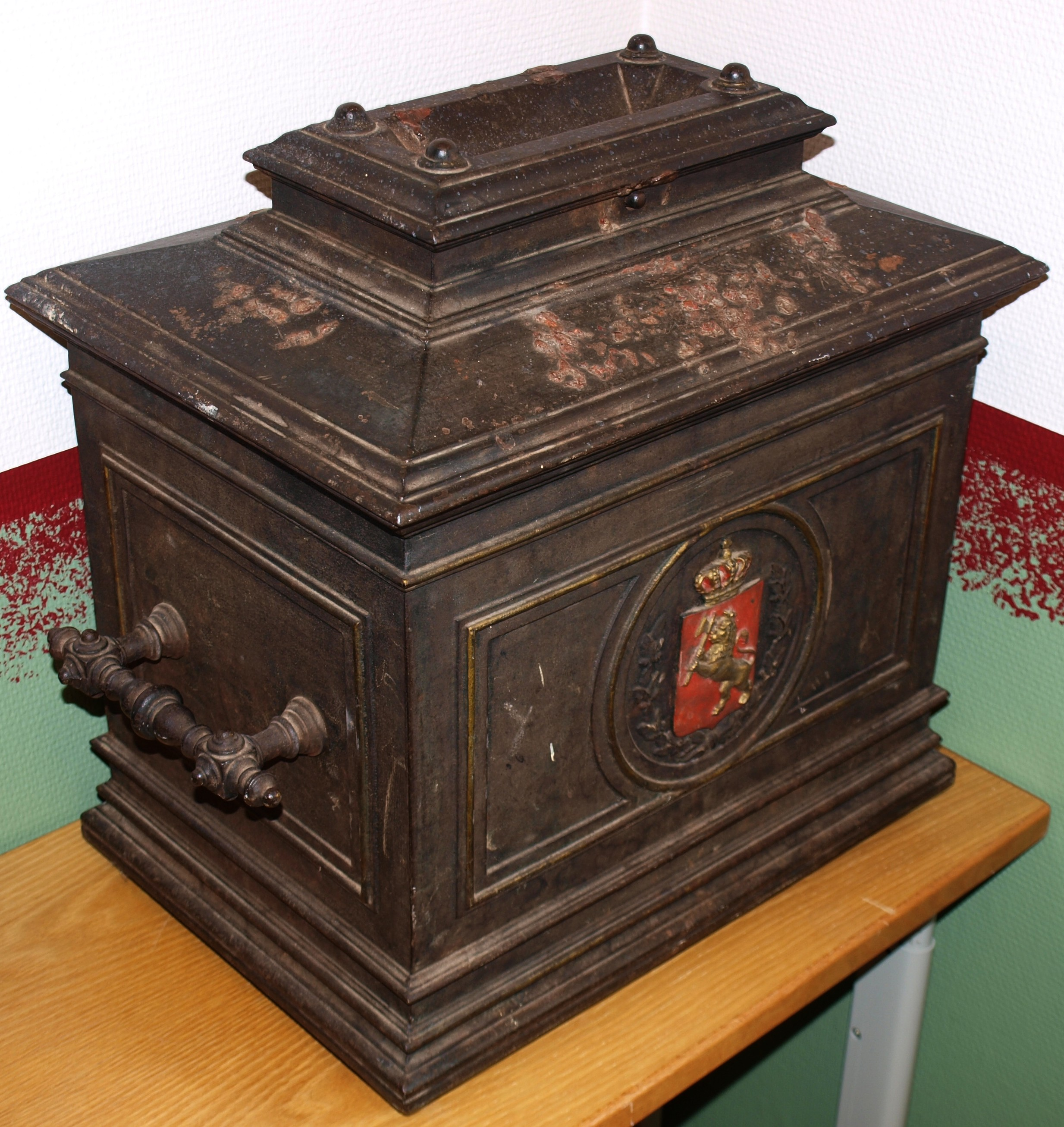
Old Norwegian voting urn. In Augustinussen's time, members of parliament were chosen by indirect election. Credit: Olve Utne

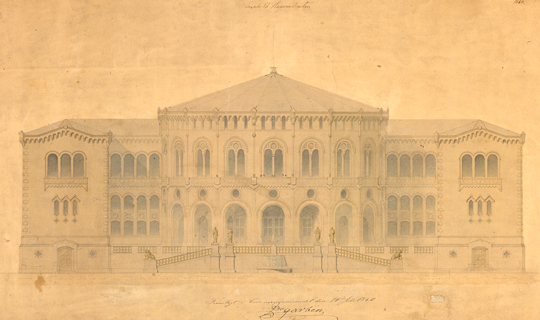
The Storting building was planned during the time when Augustinussen was a representative. On 18 May 1860, architect Emil Victor Langlet's suggested design (pictured) was accepted, and the building was ready and first used in 1866.

Johan Augustinussen was born at "Oppigården" in Langset, a farm in Sjona some distance east of the village of Nesna. His parents were Augustinius Larssøn (1762–1815) and Kirstine Olsdatter (1770–1843). His paternal grandfather Lars Johnsen (1720–1767) was a farmer at Sandnes in Nesna, and his maternal grandfather Peder Tønder (1697–1735) had been a lensmann. Augustinius Larssøn was an enterprising fisherman; he owned, among others, both a færing and a six-oared row boat, many fishing nets and longlines, and also rorbu in Kabelvåg. His estate testified to his wealth, especially by the standards at the time, since in addition to the aforementioned boats, he also owned nine cows, a horse and a windmill. Local historian Øyvind Jenssen describes him as a man of "great reputation in the village", for example, he was one of the chosen parishioners who signed the authorization of the electors from Nesna for the Norwegian Constituent Assembly (Riksforsamlingen) in 1814.

From 1814 through until the 1903 Norwegian parliamentary election, members of parliament were elected through indirect election. All market towns and prestegjeld appointed electors, in the market towns there was one elector per 50 voters and in the prestegjeld one per 100 voters. The Constitution of Norway set strict limitations on who had suffrage. In 1814 Nesna appointed two electors for the election for 1815–1817, one of them, lensmann Jens Eliassen, was elected as the fourth deputy. In addition to the right to vote being limited, political interest was also weak. In 1841 there were 221 voters in Nesna prestegjeld and only 25 voted, in 1860, 27 voted. In the country, each county amounted to a separate electoral district, and the electors from each district would come together "at a decide location of one of the authority's and 'appoint' someone either from their own number or from among the official voters...as many representatives as the district was entitled to have..." The electors from Nordland county met in Bodø, and from 1833, elected four representatives (earlier three, from 1883, five).

Johan was the youngest of seven siblings, but only he and Ole, the brother four years older than him, reached adulthood. Johan's father died in 1815, and his mother remarried in 1816 with Møller Andersen Zahl from Handnes who was 20 years her younger. Johan's mother died in 1843, and Zahl remarried in 1845 with Anne Pedersdatter from Handnesøya. Jenssen describes her as a warm and good person who Johan had a good relationship with.

=== Parliamentary sessions ===
According to the constitution, the parliament would assemble once ever three years, and it was in 1869 that constitutional changes were made resulting in yearly parliamentary sessions. These sessions, called "parliament proper" lasted around half a year during Augustinussen's time. In addition the constitution's articles §§69-70 granted the king power to summon an extraordinary parliament, so-called "parliament super proper". In the eight terms from 1848 to 1870 whilst Augustinussen was a member of parliament, two parliaments super proper were summoned, in 1858 and in 1864. Altogether, parliament was assembled ten times in this period, and Augustinussen attended all of these. He was granted a short leave of absence four times, and after one of these he took sick leave, J.A. Arctander had to serve as deputy for him at the assembly.

=== Teacher and choirmaster ===
The Storting building was completed in 1866. Up until 1854, parliament held its proceedings in Oslo Cathedral School's premises on the corner of Tollbodgaten and Dronningens gate. From 1854, the proceedings were held in the hall which is now known as "the Old festival hall" in the university building on Karl Johans gate. The ten parliamentary sessions that Augustinussen attended therefore had three different addresses, the first two in Oslo Cathedral School, then six in the university buildings before the last two were held in today's Storting building.

Augustinussen's parliamentary terms, with committee attendance
Parliament	assembled	committees	comments
12th proper	1 February – 26 August 1848	church committee	
13th proper	1 February – 30 September 1851	church committee, railway committee	
14th proper	1 February – 13 September 1854	election committee, church committee	leave/sickness from 15 May. Arctander attended from 3 August
15th proper	2 February – 14 October 1857	election committee, church committee, railway committee	
5th super proper	10 May – 9 June 1858	election committee, finance committee	
16the proper	1 October 1859 – 22 May 1860	authorization committee, church committee	leave from 9 May
17the proper	1 October 1862 – 22 June 1863	election committee, authorization committee, church committee no.2,	leave from 9 June
6th super proper	14 – 31 March 1864	election committee, authorization committee, committee of the Dano-German war	
18th proper	2 October 1865 - 14 June 1866	election committee, authorization committee, industry committee no. 1	leave from 15 May
19th proper	1 October 1868 – 21 June 1869	election committee, authorization committee, church committee no.2, railway committee	

Johan Augustinussen was elected to parliament eight times. With six terms of three years and two terms of to years, he was a member of parliament for 22 years, from 1848 to 1870. Only Sivert Andreas Nielsen has been elected as the representative of Nordland county more times: He was elected 13 times in the period from 1859 to 1900. In more recent times, Håkon Kyllingmark was elected seven times for a period of 28 years in total from 1954 to 1981.

=== Political orientation ===
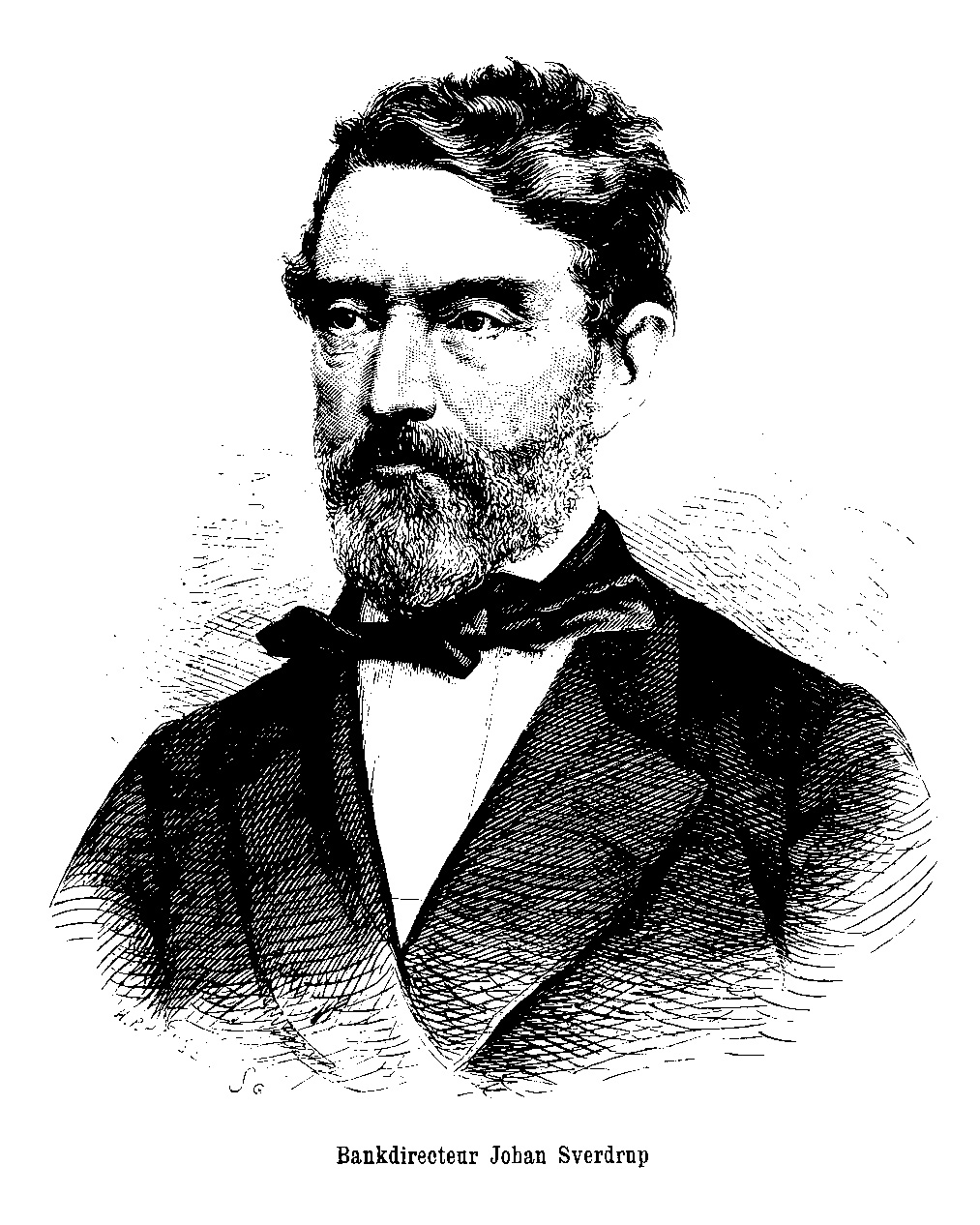
Johan Sverdrup, The Liberal Party's first leader. Augustinussen first supported Sverdup and the reform movement, but over time became extremely skeptical of what he called "Jaabækianism" and"Sverdrupianism". Augustinussen abandoned active politics when the political parties formed in 1884.

Parties in organized from did not exist in Norway during Augustinussen's time. The first Norwegian political parties were created in 1884 with the forming of The Liberal Party and The Conservative Party. There were still more or less organized factions and movements outside parliament. In the 1830s, Ole Gabriel Ueland had established a farmer's alliance with a formulated policy. Like Augustinussen, he was a choirmaster and teacher, and sat in parliament from 1833 until his death in 1870. Augustinussen became one of Ueland's faithful friends in parliament, and from the beginning he was considered to be a supporter of the farmer's alliance. Anton Christian Bang wrote in 1909 that "[Augustinussen's] party comrades among the Uelandian farmer opposition considered him to be among their most prudent and trusted men."

With Johan Sverdrup and the Reform Association in 1859, and not to mention Søren Jaabæk's Farmer's Friends Association from 1865, radicalization grew. To begin with they had support from Ueland and Augustinussen. Halvdan Koht mentions three who spoke in support of Sverdrup in the debate on the Jury Act, Augustinussen, Ueland and Jaabæk. After Sverdrup and Jaabæk entered into an alliance in 1869, in many ways parliament was split between the conservatives and the radicals. Augustinussen was not comfortable with this polarization, and so he distanced himself from earlier opinions and became more center orientated. Arne Bergsgård has characterized Augustinussen's early radicalism as "extremely yellow", and in a later letter to Bang, Augustinussen spoke very negatively about what he called "Jaabækianism" and "Sverdrupianism".

== Poetry and music ==
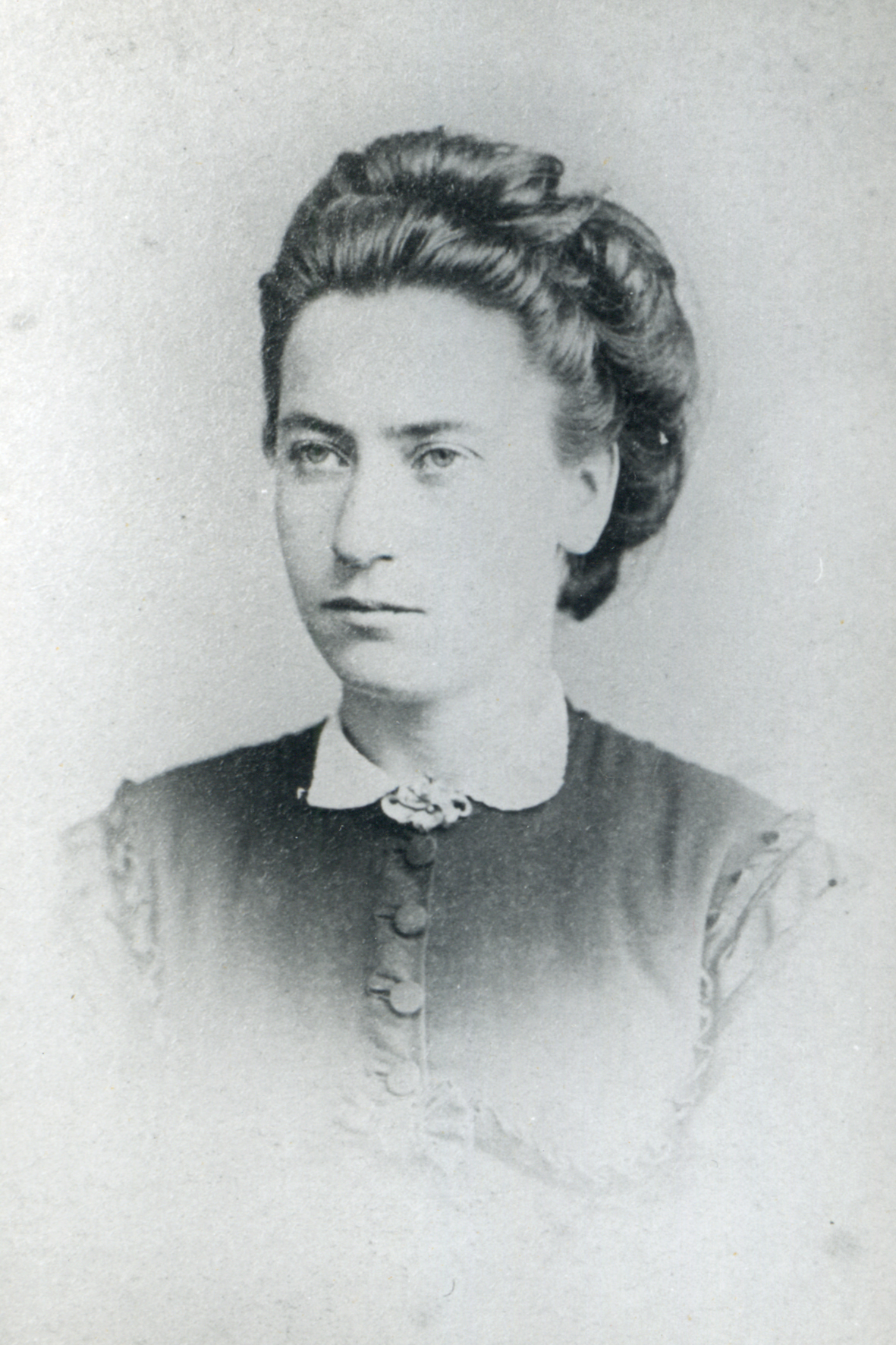
Augustinussen's daughter Christense, photo from the 1870s. Both she and her father were sources for Ole Tobias Olsen when he collected folk songs from Nordland.

Johan Augustinussen was also extremely interested in music; he played the violin and also wrote several folk songs and poems. It appears from his dairies that Augustinussen used to play the violin at parties in Kristiania. When Ole Tobias Olsen collected his folk songs from Nordland, he received several melodies both from Augustinussen and from his daughter Christense. In 1842 Augustinussen sought a short leave in order to take singing lessons in Bodø, this may have some correlation with the "Roverudian improvement in singing" . During the lessons he used a psalmodicon, an instrument with only one string.

Ivar Aasen referenced Augustinussen as a source for his "words from Nordland", and mentions him several times in his diaries from 1857 to 1869.

Augustinussen's diary from his time in parliament has been used as a source for later historians. Arne Bergsgård calls it "an amusing little diary" Jens Arup Seip wrote that Augustinussen's diaries had been a great help in his work, and provided a fine picture of the political flows from that time. Augustinussen also wrote poems and folk songs. Bang mentions that the folk song Astøings-visen was later published in Tromsø at M. Urdal's publishing house, "printed from a very erroneous transcript". Sections of the poem Kveldshugnad (7 of the 20 verses) are translated in the Nesna's Village Book, volume 2, and Astøingsvise and Åsværvise are printed in Helgeland's Yearbook, 1977.

A longer poem called "The Parliament's assembly in February 1871", was posthumously printed in Helgeland's Tidings in 1899. In the poem Augustinussen is invisibly present at the opening of the Storting, and welcomes every member of parliament, one after another as they arrive. The poem has explanatory notes from Augustinussen himself. A transcript was printed in Helgeland's Yearbook in 1981 and lasted nine pages. The poem is mildly satirical, it seems to be mostly be cheerful with friendly comments. Its sting is certainly pointed against Jaabæk and his supporters, and he also brings up old political battles, that hints at the debate over the railway in Trondheim.

== Family and children ==
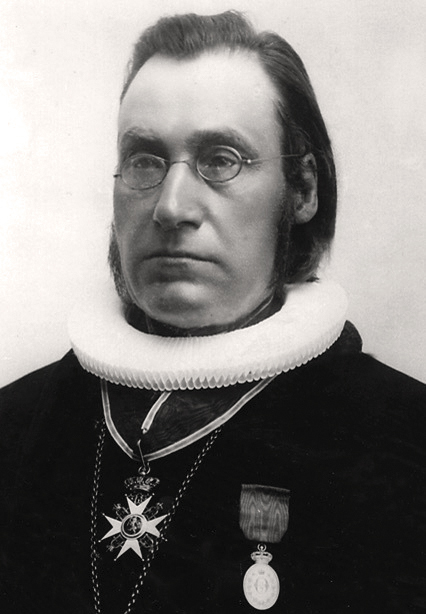
Bishop, professor and minister Anton Christian Bang knew Augustinussen from the time of his own confirmation and expressed great admiration for him. His book Erindringer from 1909 is used as a source.

In 1833, Johan Augustinussen was married to Christine Birgitte Iversdatter (1807–1887), daughter of Ivar Olsen Løkberg (1753-1810) and Kiersten Pedersdatter (1773-1861). They had four children, but three of them died before their father. Augustinussen's son Kristian died as a baby. His other son Ivar became a teacher and was, since the time of his confirmation, a close friend of future bishop and minister Anton Christian Bang. He died at the young age of 24 in 1862. Augustinussen's oldest son (f. 1834) had worked at the magistrate of Saura, and later became a lensmann in Hamarøy Municipality. He committed suicide in 1877. His daughter Christense Oline was born on 23 February 1846. On 5 August 1875, she married the farmer Johan Anton Olsen at Sandnes in Nesna, and had three sons. She died on 19 April 1929, when she was 83 years old.

== Legacy and recognitions ==
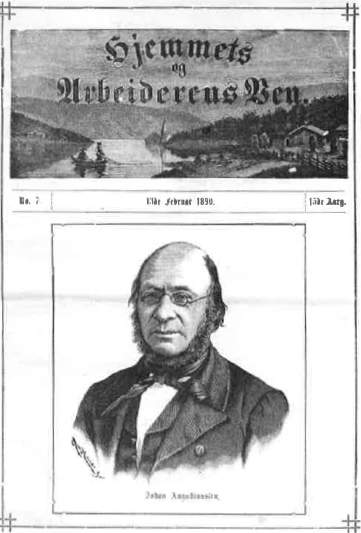
In February 1890, Augustinussen was profiled on the front page of Hjemmets og Arbeiderens Ven

Bang writes about Augustinussen in his autobiographical book Erindringer from 1909:

Jeg blev snart fyldt af Beundring for den dengang saa populære Stortingsmand. Han var et let og lyst Hoved, varmhjertet og tillidsvækkende i sin Færd, overlegen dygtig, naar det gjaldt at give Raad i vanskelige Spørgsmaal, sprudlende af Humor baade i bunden og ubunden Stil, den fuldt ud dannede Mand i hele sin Maade at være paa. Han stod dengang paa sin Berømmelses Høide, hans Portræt med en meget anerkjendende Biografi havde staaet i "Almuevennen", Helgelands Almue var stolt af ham og holdt det for en Ære at repræsenteres paa Stortinget af ham.

Augustinussen has been characterized as "the most towering and influential individual in Nesna's history". Øyvind Jenssen, local historian and earlier mayor f Nesna, writes that "No other single person has effected the development of Nesna municipality as strongly as the municipality's first mayor, Johan Augustinussen."

Johan Augustinussen received the medal for outstanding civil service in silver. When he reached the age of 70 on 10 May 1878, he received, with great surprise, a "very expensive mantelpiece clock" from Nesna municipality. In addition to the article in Friend of the common people, which Bang refers to, Augustinussen was also profiled in The home's and worker's friend on 13 February 1890 after his death, and also in Helgeland's Tidings no.4 1889.

Augustinussen died on 22 November 1888 of a stroke according to the ministerial book for the Nesna prestegjeld.

== Sources ==
=== Bibliography ===
- Andenæs, Johs. (1990). Statsforfatningen i Norge. Oslo: TANO. ISBN 8251828309.
- Augustinussen, Johan (1899). "Stortingets sammentræden i februar 1871". Helgelands Tidende for 17. januar 1899. Mosjøen. Sitert fra avskrift i Årbok for Helgeland 1981; side 114–123. ISBN 8290148259.
- Bang, Anton Chr. (1909). Erindringer. Kristiania: Gyldendalske Boghandel.
- Bergsgård, Arne (1932). Ole Gabriel Ueland og bondepolitikken. Vol. 1. Oslo: Aschehoug.
- Bergsgård, Arne (1932). Ole Gabriel Ueland og bondepolitikken. Vol. 2. Oslo: Aschehoug.
- Cappelen, J. (1885). Hovedregister til Storthings-Forhandlinger 1814—1870 med Tillæg, indeholdende Register til Komiteindstillinger (PDF). Kristiania: J. Chr. Gundersens Bogtrykkeri.
- Haffner, Vilhelm (1949). Stortinget og statsrådet : med tillegg til Tallak Lindstøl: Stortinget og Statsraadet 1814-1914. B. 1 : Biografier med tillegg til Tallak Lindstøl: Stortinget og Statsraadet 1814-1914. Oslo: Aschehoug.
- Jenssen, Øyvind (1998). Nesna bygdebok volume 2, 1800-1920. Nesna: Nesna kommune. ISBN 8299403812.
- Jæger, Tycho C (1918). Riksforsamlingens forhandlinger : tillægsdel. Tillegg : Adresser og fuldmagter samt hovedregister tillægsdel. Kristiania: Grøndahl & Søns Boktrykkeri.
- Koht, Halvdan (1918). Johan Sverdrup 1:1816 - 1869. Kristiania: Aschehoug.
- Lindstøl, Tallak Olsen (1914). Stortinget og statsraadet : samt tillæg. B. 1 D. 2 : Biografier A-K. Kristiania.
- Lindstøl, Tallak Olsen (1914). Stortinget og statsraadet : 1814-1914. B. 2 D. 1 : De enkelte storting og statsraader 1814-1885. Kristiania.
- Lovund, Johannes (1996). "Skolesentrum i snart to hundre år: skolestedet Nesna". In Eilertsen, Turid Følling (ed.). Fotefar mot nord. Bodø: Nordland fylkeskommune. ISBN 82-91138-69-9.
- Olsen, Ole Tobias (1982). Øystein Gaukstad (ed.). Folketonar frå Nordland. Oslo: Noregs boklag. ISBN 8252204910.
- Aasen, Ivar (1960). Reidar Djupedal (ed.). Brev og dagbøker. Vol. III. Oslo: Samlaget. Archived from the original on 2015-01-12.

=== Websites, newspapers etc. ===
- "Christiania Om Skolesagen". Aftenposten. 9 June 1869.
- Helgeland museum (10 August 2010). "Klokkergården - skolebygning fra 1823". Helgelandmuseum.no. Archived from the original on 9 May 2019.
- "Ministerialbok [for Nesna] nr. 838A06 (1829-1839)". arkivverket.
- "Stortingsbygningen fra 1866 til i dag". stortinget.no. Archived from the original on 7 October 2009.
- "Johan Augustinussen". Norsk senter for forskningsdata. Archived from the original on December 20, 2016.
