= Augustinussen =

Augustinussen is a surname. Notable people with the surname include:

- Johan Augustinussen (1808–1888), Norwegian curate/choirmaster, teacher, and politician
- Thomas Augustinussen (born 1981), Danish footballer and coach
