= Siffernotskrift =

Form of numbered musical notation

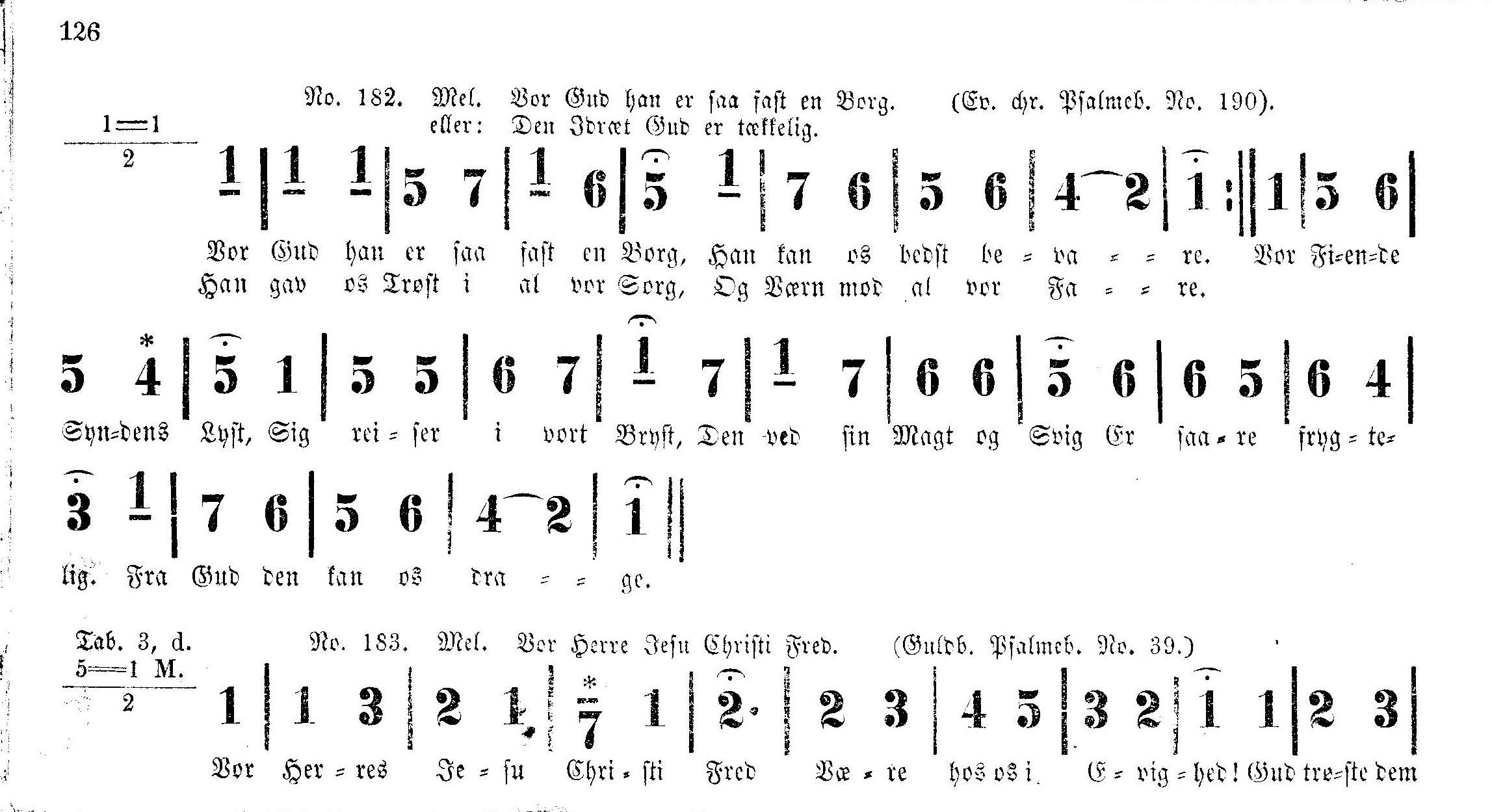
Notation for the psalmodicon from Lindeman's Coral-Melodier for Psalmodicon i siffertoneskrift for the tune «Vor Gud han er saa fast en Borg» aka «A Mighty Fortress Is Our God»

Siffernotskrift (lit. 'numerical note writing') or sifferskrift is a form of numbered musical notation in which numerals are given which correspond to musical notes on given instruments. The system was devised and used by Swedish clergyman, psalmist, and music educator Johan Dillner (1785–1862) in the hymnal he wrote 1830 for the psalmodicon – a one-string, bowed string instrument.

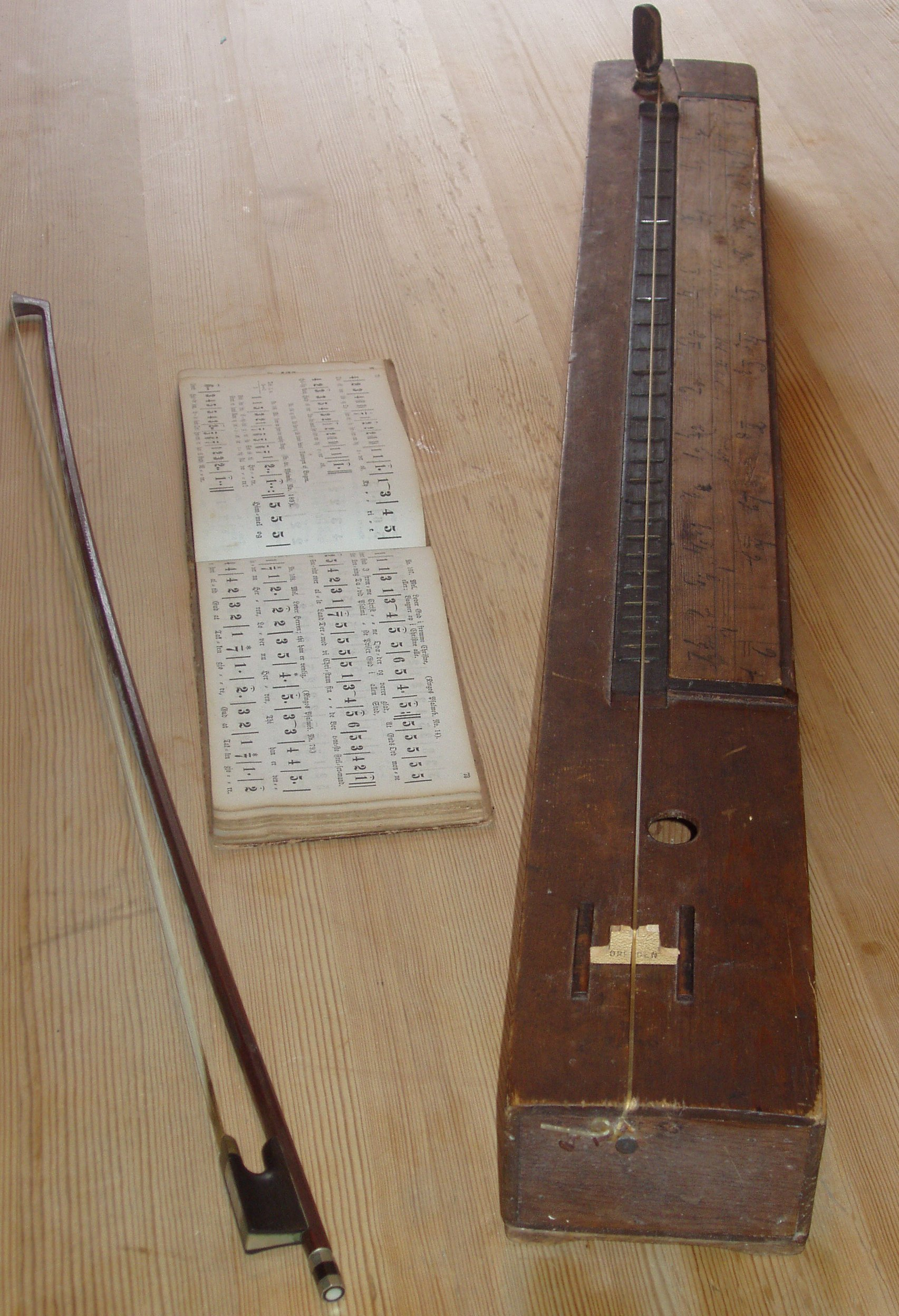
Psalmodicon with siffernotskrift book

Unlike the Galin-Paris-Chevé system of numbered notation, octave shifts are described using a combination of under/overlining and a shift in the position of numbers. The first phrase of the Vor Gud han er saa fast en Borg (A Mighty Fortress Is Our God) would become the following in the Asian GPC notation:

•1 | •1 •1 | 5 7 | •1 6 ...
