= Ole Tobias Olsen =

Norwegian teacher and minister (1830–1924)

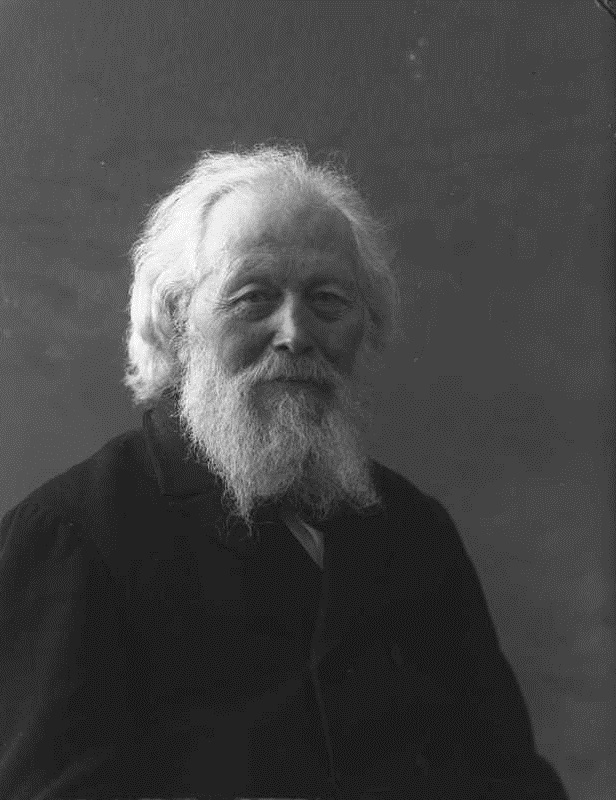
Ole Tobias Olsen in 1908

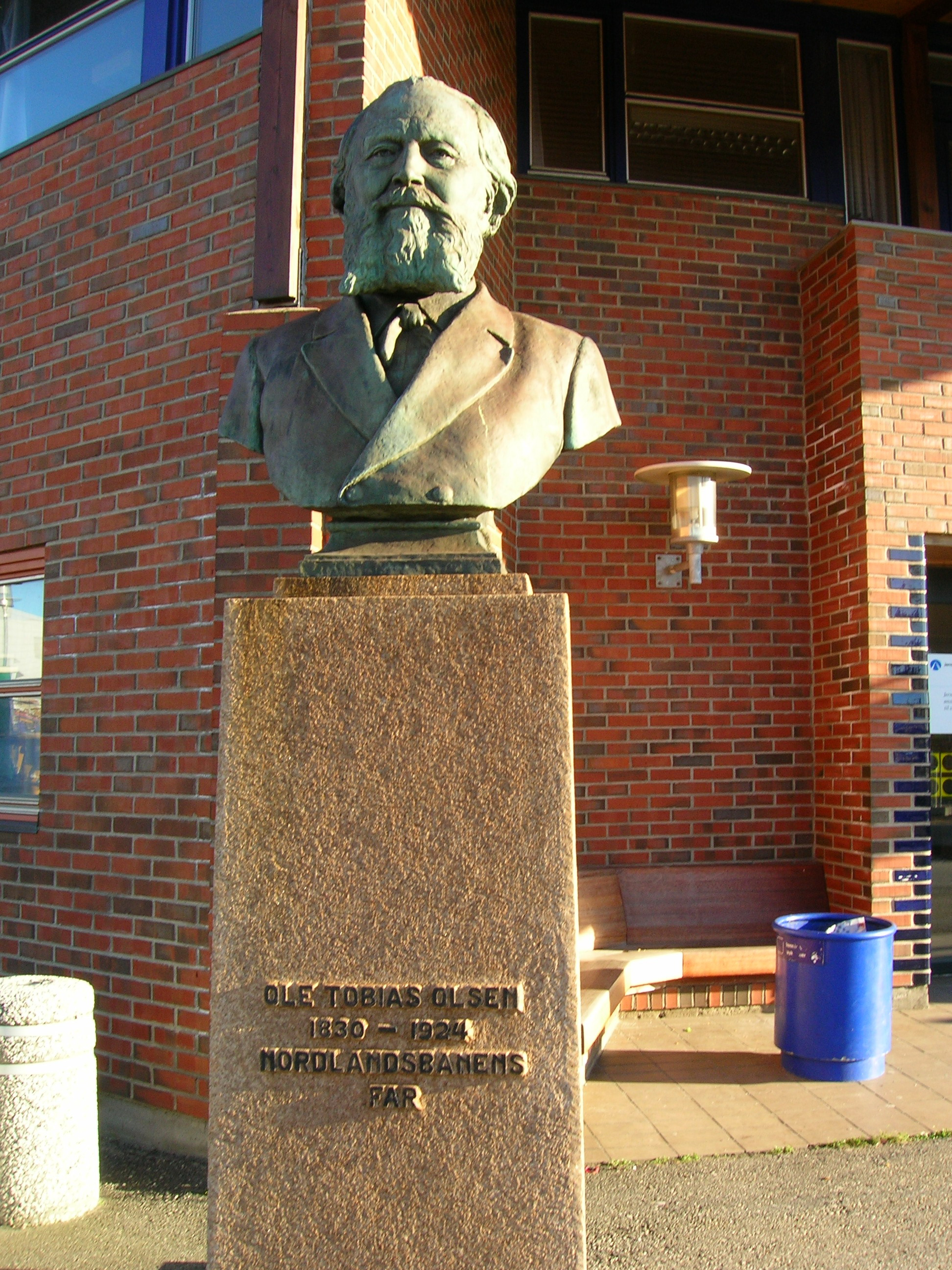
Bust of Ole Tobias Olsen at Mo i Rana railway station

Ole Tobias Olsen (18 August 1830 – 6 July 1924) was a Norwegian teacher and minister. He is best known as the father of the Nordland Line between Trondheim and Bodø in Nordland county, Norway.

== Biography ==
Olsen was a teacher in Tromsø during 1851 followed by service in Hadsel Municipality in Vesterålen and Kristiania, now Oslo in 1855. He earned his theological degree in 1865. In 1870, he received a scholarship to collect local fairy tales, folklore and folk tunes from Rana Municipality. He was vicar and mayor of Hattfjelldal Municipality from 1883 to 1904. In 1905, he moved to Kristiania where he lived until his death.

In early 1870, he had undertaken a preliminary study of a proposed railway line eastwards from Mo i Rana. He first proposed in construction of the 729 km. long Northern Line railway from Bodø to Trondheim in Morgenbladet during 1872. He was a member of Nordland County Railway Commission from 1885. In 1919, he was knighted 1st class in the Order of St. Olav. In 1923, the year before he died, the Norwegian Parliament approved the Nordland Line to be extend to Bodo, the end destination of the rail line.

== Personal life ==
Ole Tobias Olsen was from the Dunderlandsdalen valley in Rana Municipality in Nordland county, Norway. He was born on the Bjøllånes farm, the son of farmer Ole Pedersen Bjellånes (1774–1849) and Milda Nilsdotter (1800–1878). In 1877, he married Christine Bernhardine Dahl (1855–1910). Together they had ten children.

== Selected works ==
- Nogle Indlednings-Salmer – 1891
- Norske folkeeventyr og sagn: samlet i Nordland – 1912

== Memorials ==
- Mo I Rana - Ole Tobias Hotel
- Mo I Rana - Ole Tobias Olsens gate
- Mo I Rana - Bust at Mo i Rana Rail station
- Bodø - Ole Tobias Olsens vei

== Other Source ==
- Svanberg, Erling (1990) Langs vei og lei i Nordland : samferdsel i Nordland gjennom 3000 år (Bodø: Nordland fylkeskommune) ISBN 8274160215.
