= Psalmodicon =

Stringed musical instrument

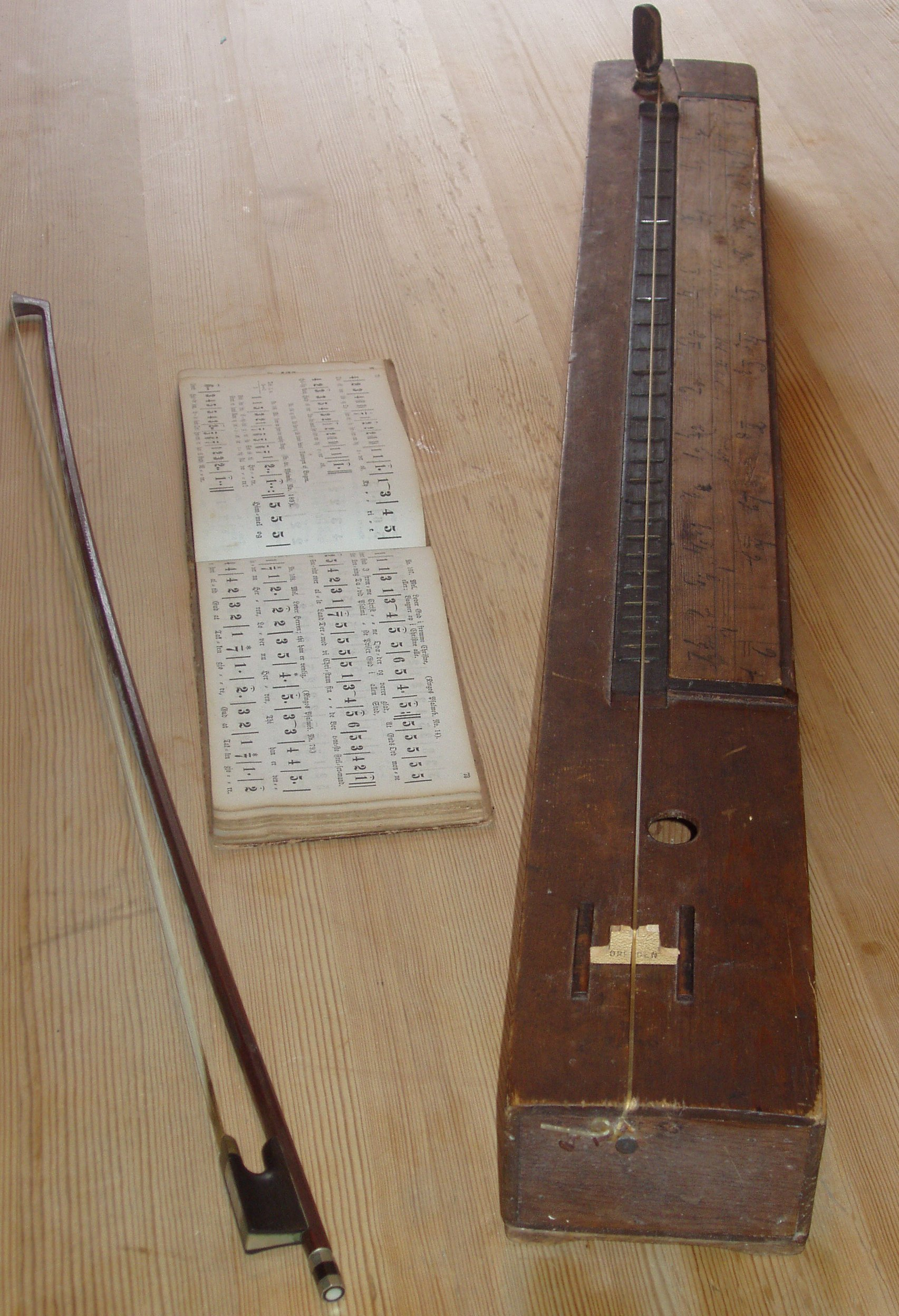
Psalmodicon from a farm on the island Skorpa in Helgeland, Norway, with bow and music book in siffernotskrift

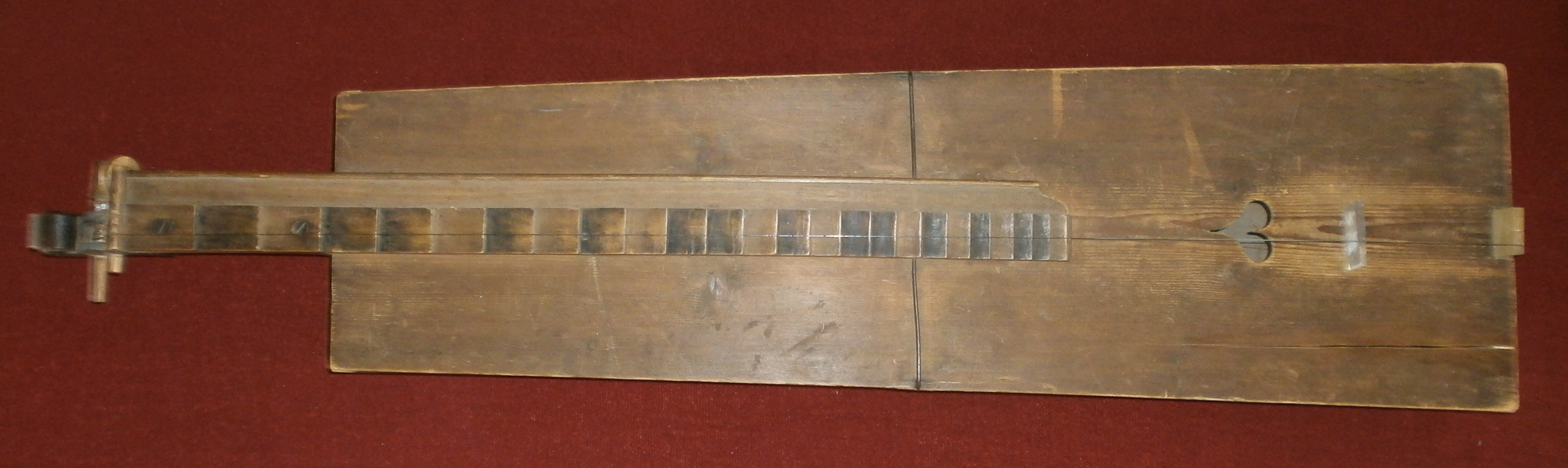
Psalmodikon from Gagnef, Dalarna, Sweden, made in 1869, originally with three strings

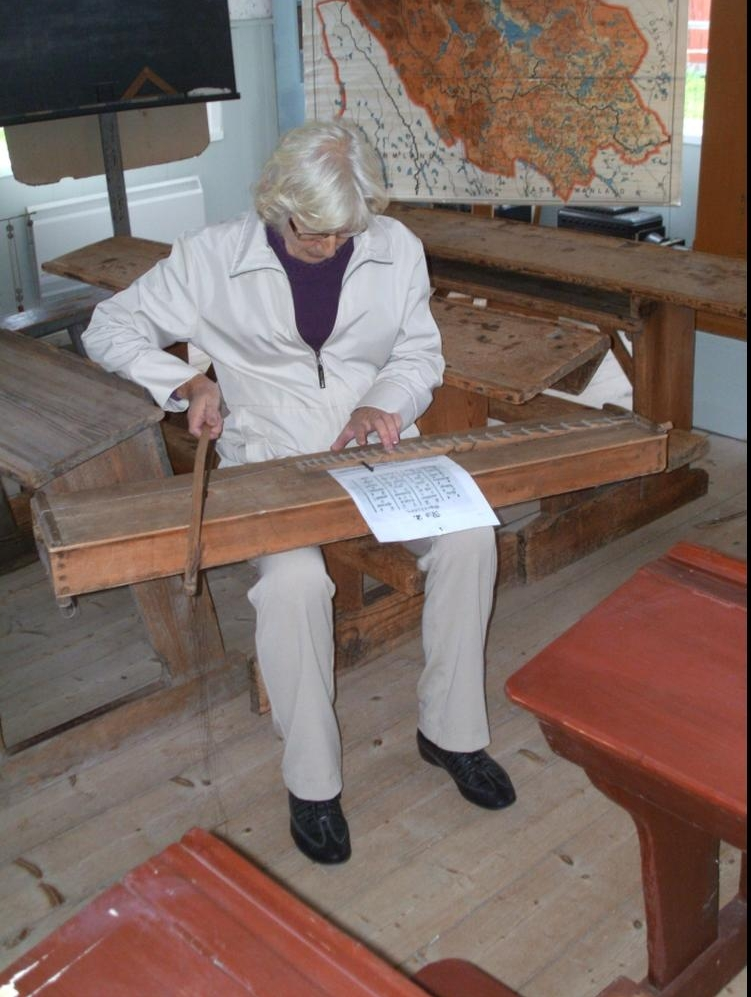
Psalmodikon, played at the School Museum in Djurmo, Dalarna, Sweden

The psalmodicon (psalmodikon or salmodikon) is a stringed musical instrument a type of Monochord; the most common variants have a single string. It was developed in Scandinavia for simplifying music in churches and schools, and as an alternative to the fiddle for sacred music. The instrument could be plucked or bowed. Beginning in the early 19th century, it was adopted by many rural churches in Scandinavia; later, immigrants brought the instrument to the United States.

At the time, many congregations could not afford organs. Dance instruments were considered inappropriate for sacred settings, so violins were not allowed. The psalmodikon, on the other hand, was inexpensive to build, was not used for dancing, took up little space, and could be played by people with little musical training. Its slow, melodic quality worked well with the hymns of the period. Examples of older printed music from these churches often have numbers written over the words, corresponding to numbers painted on the fret board of the psalmodikon. This system, known as siffernotskrift, allowed players who could not read standard musical notation to accompany hymns. As churches saved money for organs, however, psalmodikons became less common; by the late 20th century, they were rarely seen outside museums. In later years, however, the instrument was reintroduced by multi-instrumentalist folk musicians.

== Construction ==
The instrument consists of a long box, upon which is a chromatic fret board with up to around 25 semitone positions. It has one to three strings of metal or of gut (or in the modern day nylon); some earlier variants included metal sympathetic strings that were not touched, but vibrated due to the sound waves around them. The measure of one Swedish instrument from 1869 is 878 millimeter, which roughly corresponds with that of a cello. Over a sawtooth shaped fret board, it originally had three metal strings, of which two were removed to facilitate the learning process.

Advanced models could be fitted with bourdon strings on both sides of the fret board, up to twelve strings that individually could be mechanically subdued.

== History ==
Though some books attribute the instrument's invention to the Swedish Lutheran priest Johan Dillner (1785–1862) from Medelpad, others note that he promoted, rather than invented, the instrument. He published a book of siffernotskrift for hymns in 1830, and claimed that he could teach anyone to play in two hours. Notable players of the instrument include Ole H. Bremnes, Salmodikon, Forlaget Habet in 1998 (in Norwegian), and Ardith K. Melloh from the Swedish Pioneer Historical Quarterly who wrote a book called "Grandfather's Songbook; Or, The Psalmodikon in America" in October 1981. There is some scholarly consensus that the instrument first developed in Denmark around 1820, and spread from there. In the 1830s and 1840s, the Norwegian music educator Lars Roverud traveled widely in Norway popularising the instrument for training students and congregations in singing.

In the United States, the instrument retains a small following among Scandinavian-descended Americans, who have formed Nordic-American Psalmodikonforbundet to promote and preserve the instrument, produce recordings and tutorials.

== Distribution ==
The instrument is also known in Lithuania as manikarka or in Latvia as vienstīdzis or manihorka; a two-string variant developed within Latvian folk music, and became the ģīga or divstīdzis. In Estonia it is known as the moldpill or mollpill and in Norway as the salmodikon or salmedunken. In Finland the instrument is known as virsikantele.

== See also ==
- Monochord
- Tromba marina
