= Lars Roverud =

Norwegian musician (1776–1850)

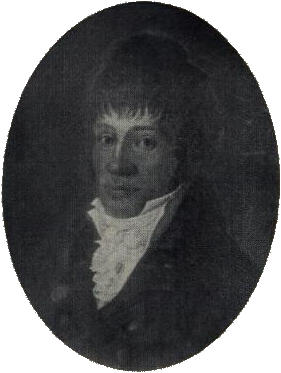
Lars Roverud by Jacob Munch

Lars Roverud (19 December 1776 – 26 February 1850) was a Norwegian musician and music teacher, among others at Asker Seminary and the Practical-Theological Seminary. He played a prominent role in popularising the psalmodikon, a one-string bowed instrument, for musical education and church music in Norway.
