= Vågen, Nordland =

Village in Bø Municipality, Norway

Vågen
- Village
- Interactive map of Vågen
- Location within Nordland Location within Norway
- Coordinates: 68.7776°N 14.4659°E
- Country: Norway
- Region: Northern Norway
- County: Nordland
- District: Vesterålen
- Municipality: Bø Municipality
- Elevation: 6 m (20 ft)
- Time zone: UTC+01:00 (CET)
  - Summer (DST): UTC+02:00 (CEST)
- Post Code: 8475 Straumsjøen

Vågen is a village in Bø Municipality in Nordland county, Norway. The village is located on the west side of the island of Langøya in the Vesterålen archipelago just west of the village of Nykvåg.

== Geography ==
Vågen is connected to the neighboring village of Nykvåg by County Road 916, which branches off from County Road 915 in Nykvåg and runs east before circling around Nykvåg bay to the quay in Vågen. The hill Gårdsnyken (127 meters or 417 feet) rises northwest of Vågen. The Nykvåg/Nykan Nature Reserve, encompassing the Nykan islands, lies east of Vågen.
