= Fishing village =

Village with an economy based on catching fish and harvesting seafood

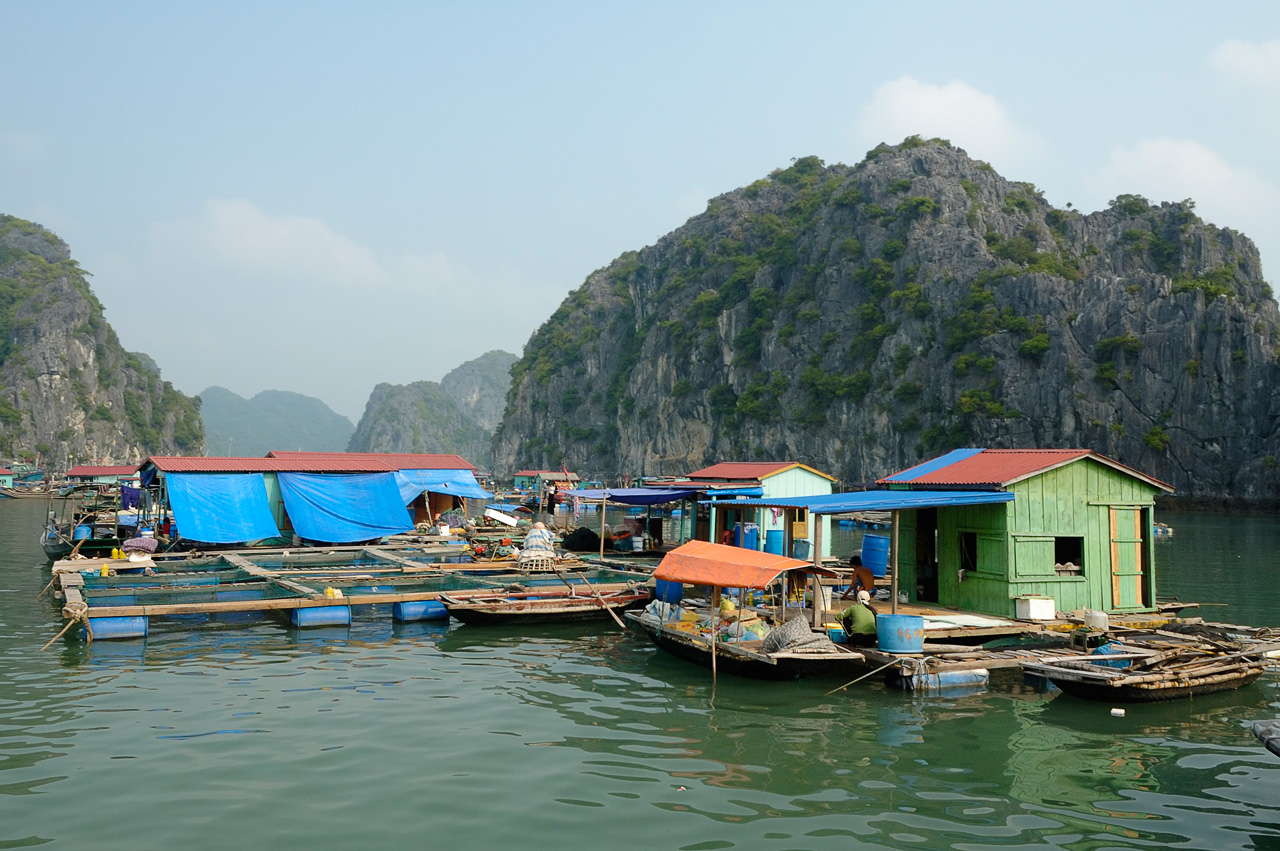
An unconventional floating fishing village in Halong Bay, Vietnam

A fishing village is a village, usually located near a fishing ground, with an economy based on catching fish and harvesting seafood. The continents and islands around the world have coastlines totalling around 356,000 kilometres (221,000 mi). From Neolithic times, these coastlines, as well as the shorelines of inland lakes and the banks of rivers, have been punctuated with fishing villages. Most surviving fishing villages are traditional.

== Characteristics ==
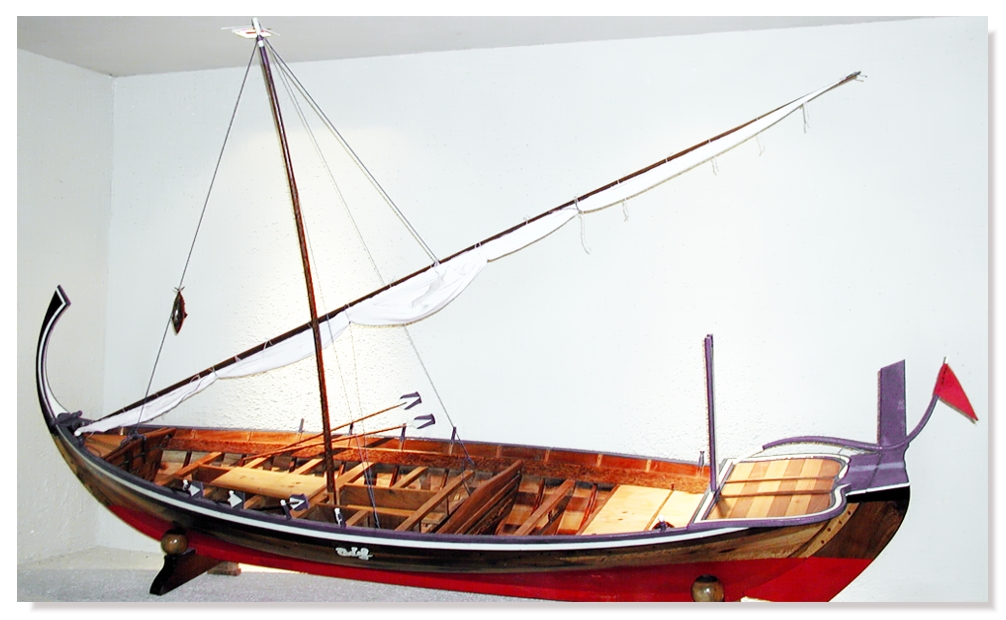
The dhoni is a traditional village fishing boat still used for fishing in the Maldives.

Coastal fishing villages are often somewhat isolated, and sited around a small natural harbour which provides a safe haven for a village fleet of fishing boats. The village needs to provide a safe way of landing fish and securing boats when they are not in use. Fishing villages may operate from a beach, particularly around lakes. For example, around parts of Lake Malawi, each fishing village has its own beach. If a fisherman from outside the village lands fish on the beach, he gives some of the fish to the village headman. Village fishing boats are usually characteristic of the stretch of coast along which they operate. Traditional fishing boats evolve over time to meet the local conditions, such as the materials available locally for boat building, the type of sea conditions the boats will encounter, and the demands of the local fisheries.

Some villages move out onto the water itself, such as the floating fishing villages of Ha Long Bay in Vietnam, the stilt houses of Tai O built over tidal flats near Hong Kong, and the kelong found in waters off Malaysia, the Philippines and Indonesia. Other fishing villages are built on floating islands, such as the Phumdi on Loktak Lake in India, and the Uros on Lake Titicaca which borders Peru and Bolivia.

Apart from catching fish, fishing villages often support enterprises typically found in other types of village, such as village crafts, transport, schools and health clinics, housing and community water supplies. In addition, there are enterprises that are natural to fishing villages, such as fish processing and marketing, and the building and maintenance of boats. Until the 19th century, some villagers supplemented their incomes with wrecking (taking valuables from nearby shipwrecks) and smuggling.

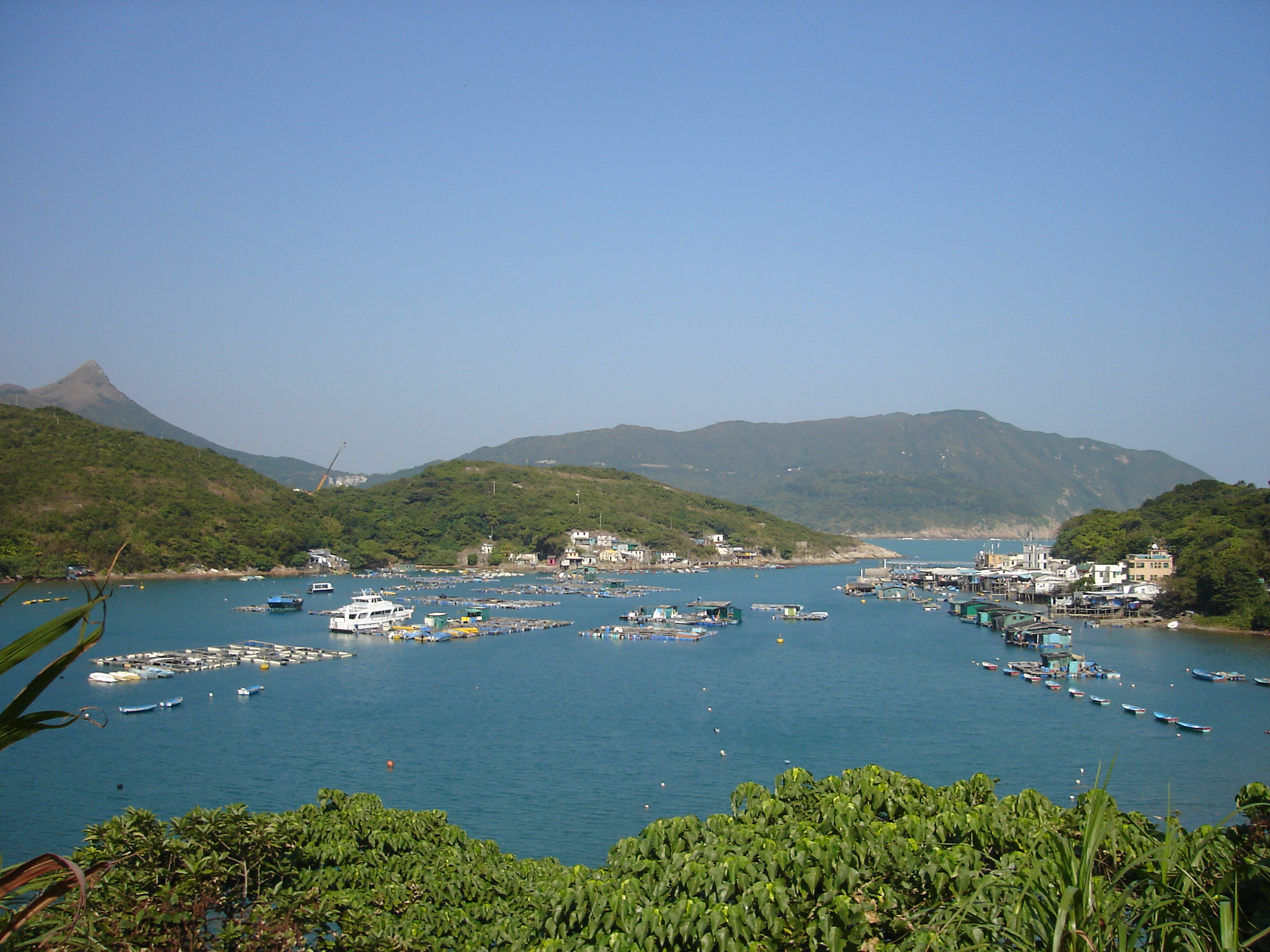
Po Toi O is a small active fishing village at Clear Water Bay Peninsula near Hong Kong

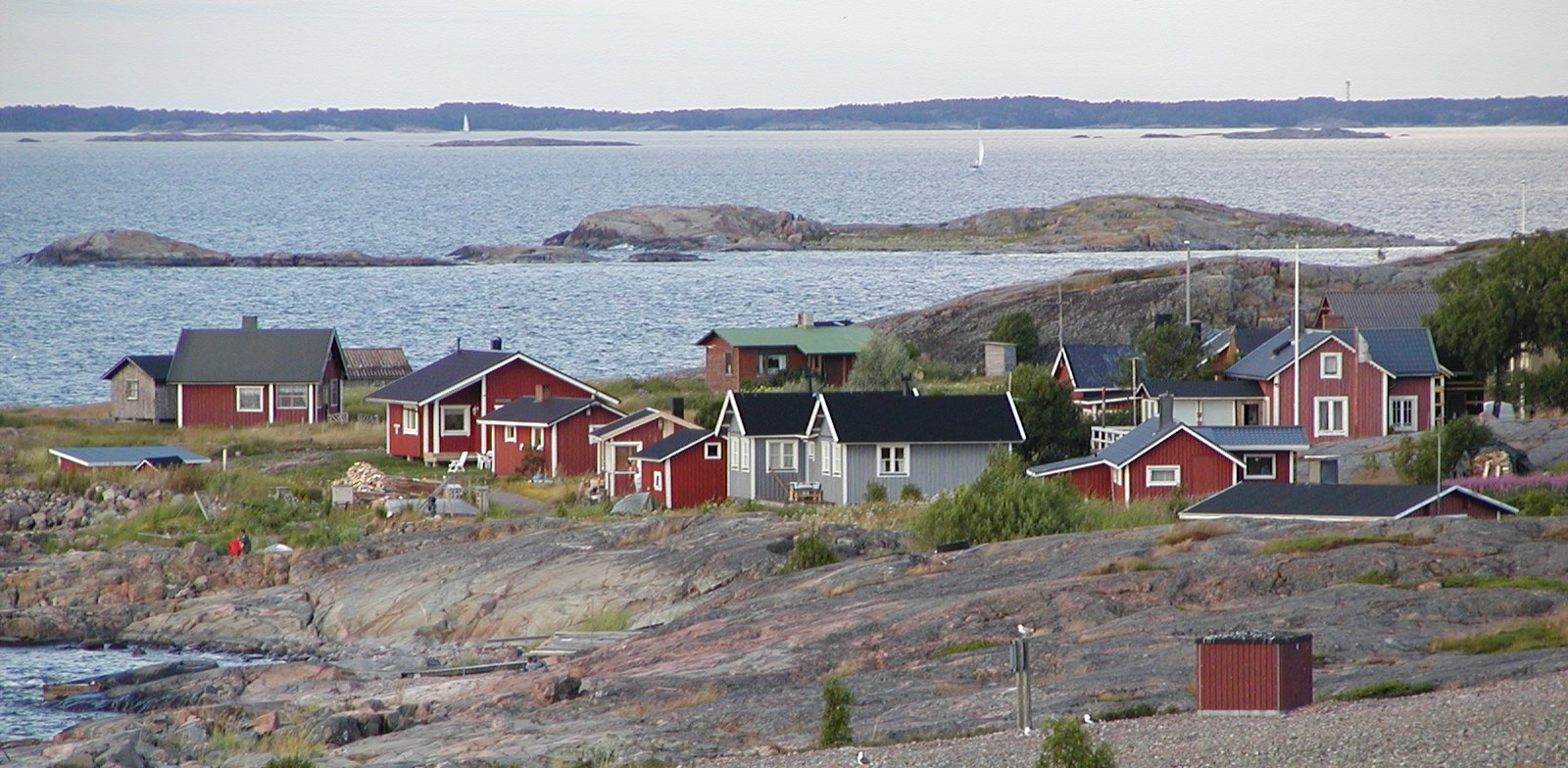
A fishing village at Jurmo Island in Korpo, Finland

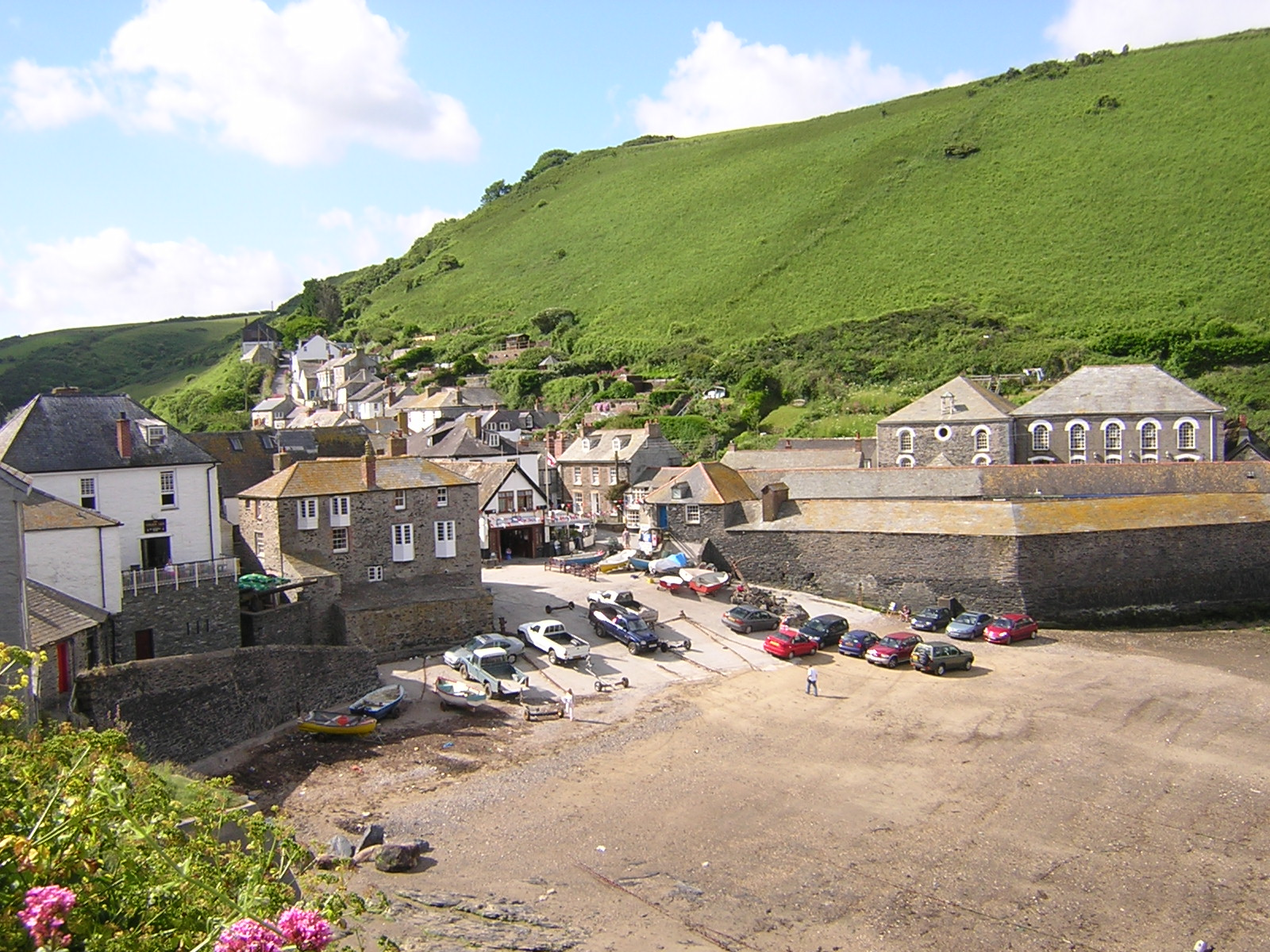
Port Isaac, a historic fishing village on the north coast of Cornwall

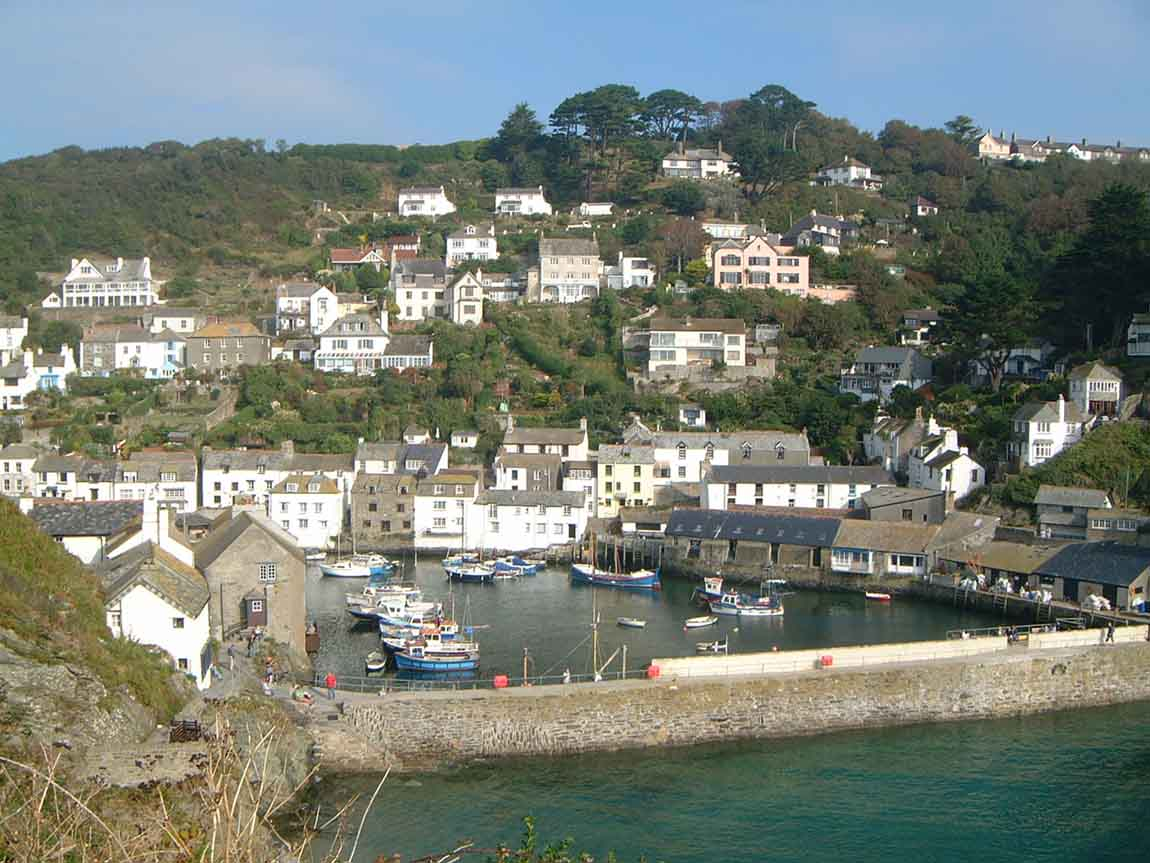
Polperro, on the south coast of Cornwall, has been an active fishing and smuggling port since the 12th century CE

In less developed countries, some traditional fishing villages persist in ways that have changed little from earlier times. In more developed countries, traditional fishing villages are changing due to socioeconomic factors like industrial fishing and urbanization. Over time, some fishing villages outgrow their original function as artisanal fishing villages. Seven hundred years ago, Shanghai, beside the Yangtze River delta, was a small fishing village. Extended fishing communities that retain their cultural identities around a connection to water through fishing, leisure, or otherwise, are sometimes referred to as aquapelagos. In recent times, fishing villages have been increasingly targeted for tourist and leisure enterprises. Recreational fishing and leisure boat pursuits can be big business these days, and traditional fishing villages are often well positioned to take advantage of this. For example, Destin on the coast of Florida, has evolved from an artisanal fishing village into a seaside resort dedicated to tourism with a large fishing fleet of recreational charter boats. The tourist appeal of fishing villages has become so big that the Korean government is purpose-building 48 fishing villages for their tourist drawing power. In 2004 China reported it had 8,048 fishing villages.

== Early villages ==
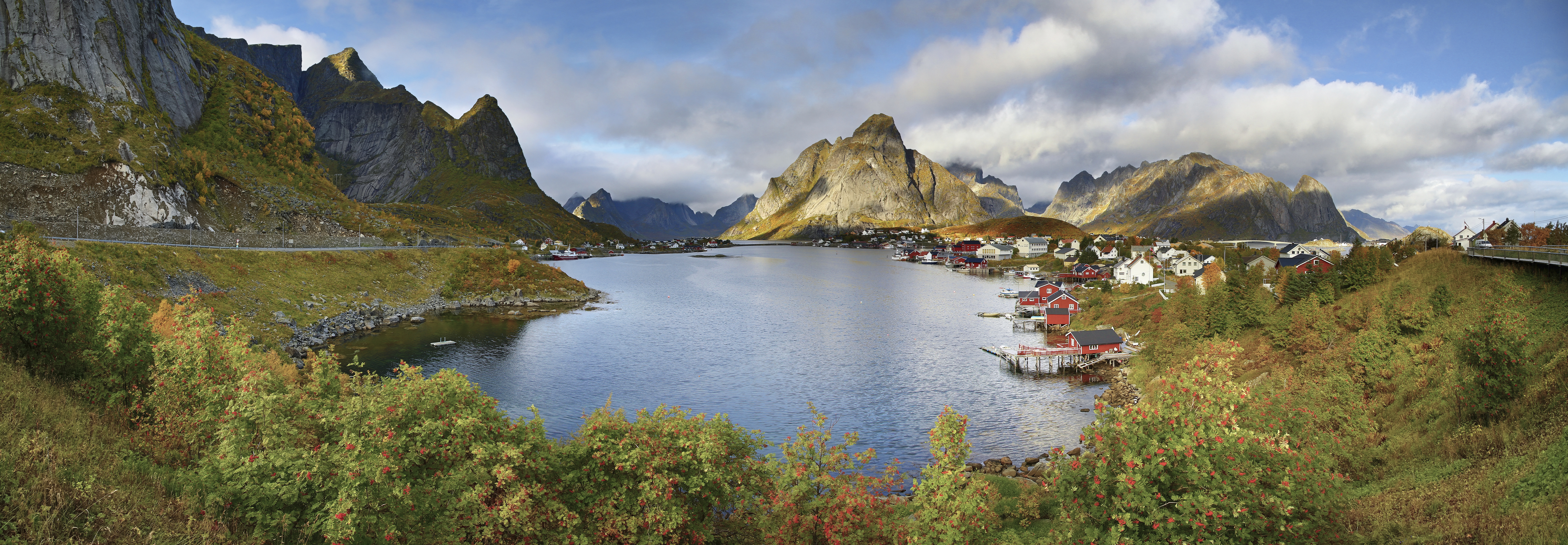
For hundreds of years a community of traditional fishing villages in the archipelago of Lofoten, Norway, was involved in the great cod fisheries. These villages were centred around what is now the village of Reine (pictured).

Skara Brae on the western coast of the Orkney mainland, off Scotland, was a small Neolithic agricultural and fishing village with ten stone houses. It was occupied from about 3100 to 2500 BC, and is Europe's most complete Neolithic village. The ancient Lycian sunken village of Kaleköy in Turkey, dates from 400 BCE. Clovelly, a fishing hamlet north Devon coast of England, an early Saxon settlement, is listed in the Domesday Book.

Recent archaeological excavations of earlier fishing settlements are occurring at some pace. A fishing village recently excavated in Khanh Hoa, Vietnam, is thought be about 3,500 years old. Excavations on the biblical fishing village Bethsaida, on the shore of the Sea of Galilee and birthplace of the apostles Peter, Philip and Andrew, have shown that Bethsaida was established in the tenth century BCE. A Tongan fishing village, recently excavated, appears to have been founded 2900 years ago. This makes it the oldest known settlement in Polynesia. Another recent excavation has been made at Walraversijde, a medieval fishing village on the coast of West Flanders in Belgium.

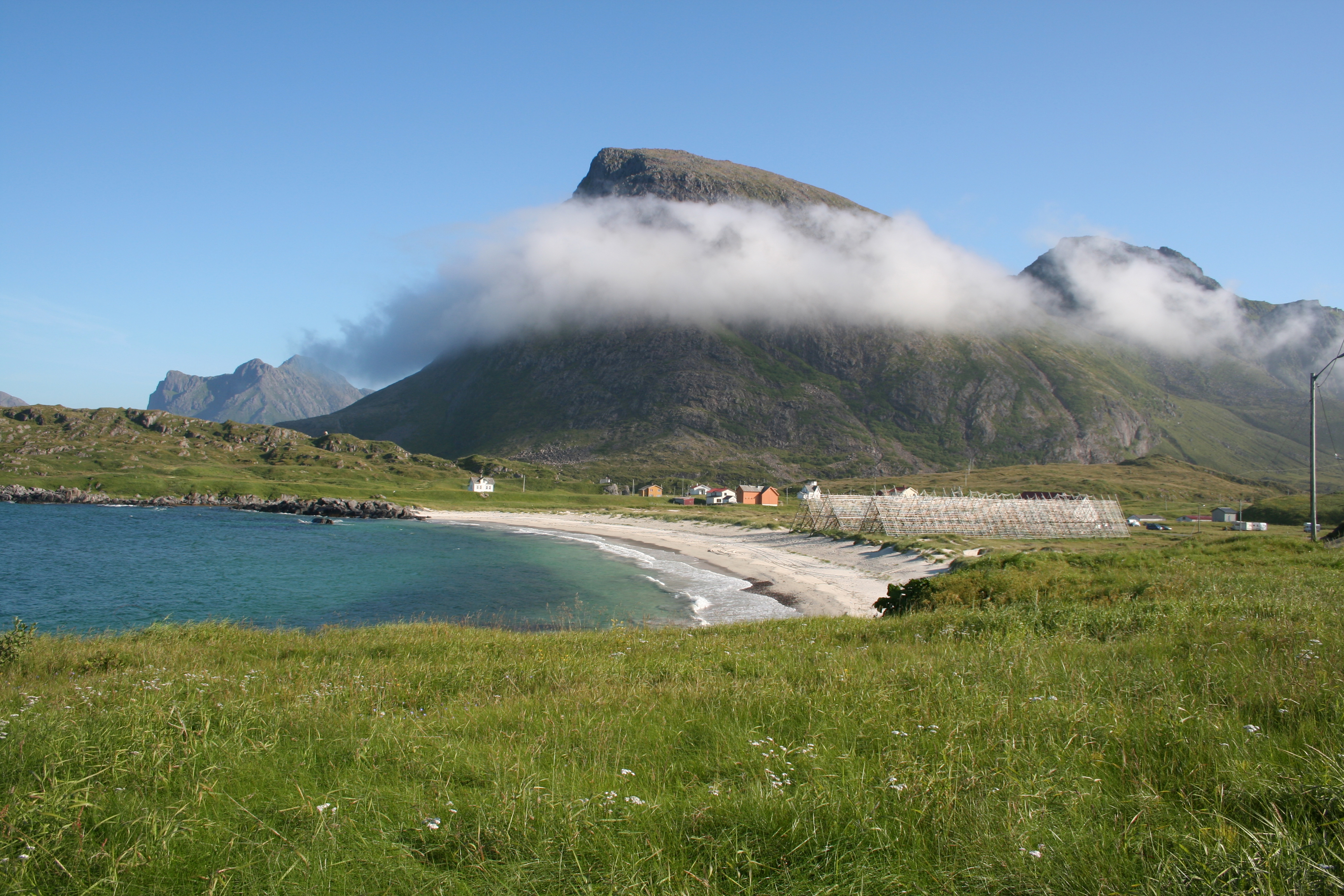
Hovden in Norway, has been fishing cod which migrate along the coast for over 1200 years.

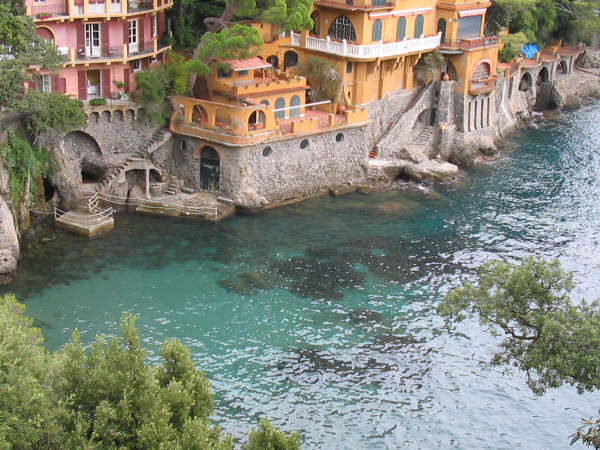
Portofino, founded in Roman times, is a picturesque fishing village on the north west Italian coast.

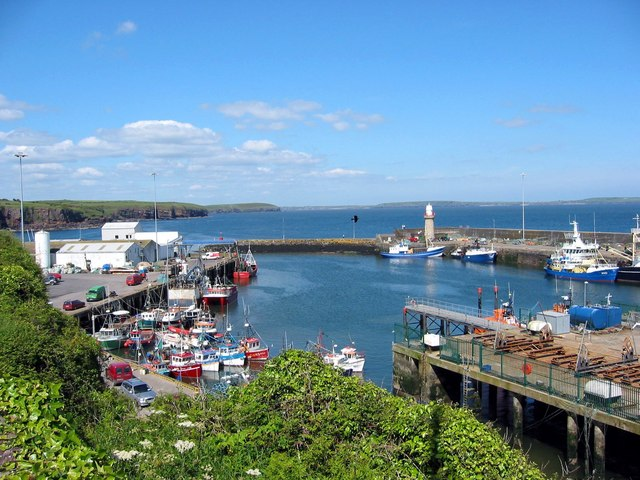
Dunmore East in south east Ireland has been a busy fishing port for hundreds of years.

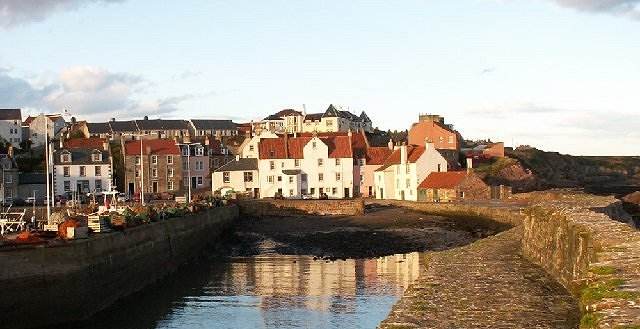
Pittenweem is a small and secluded fishing village on the east coast of Scotland, founded on historic herring fisheries.

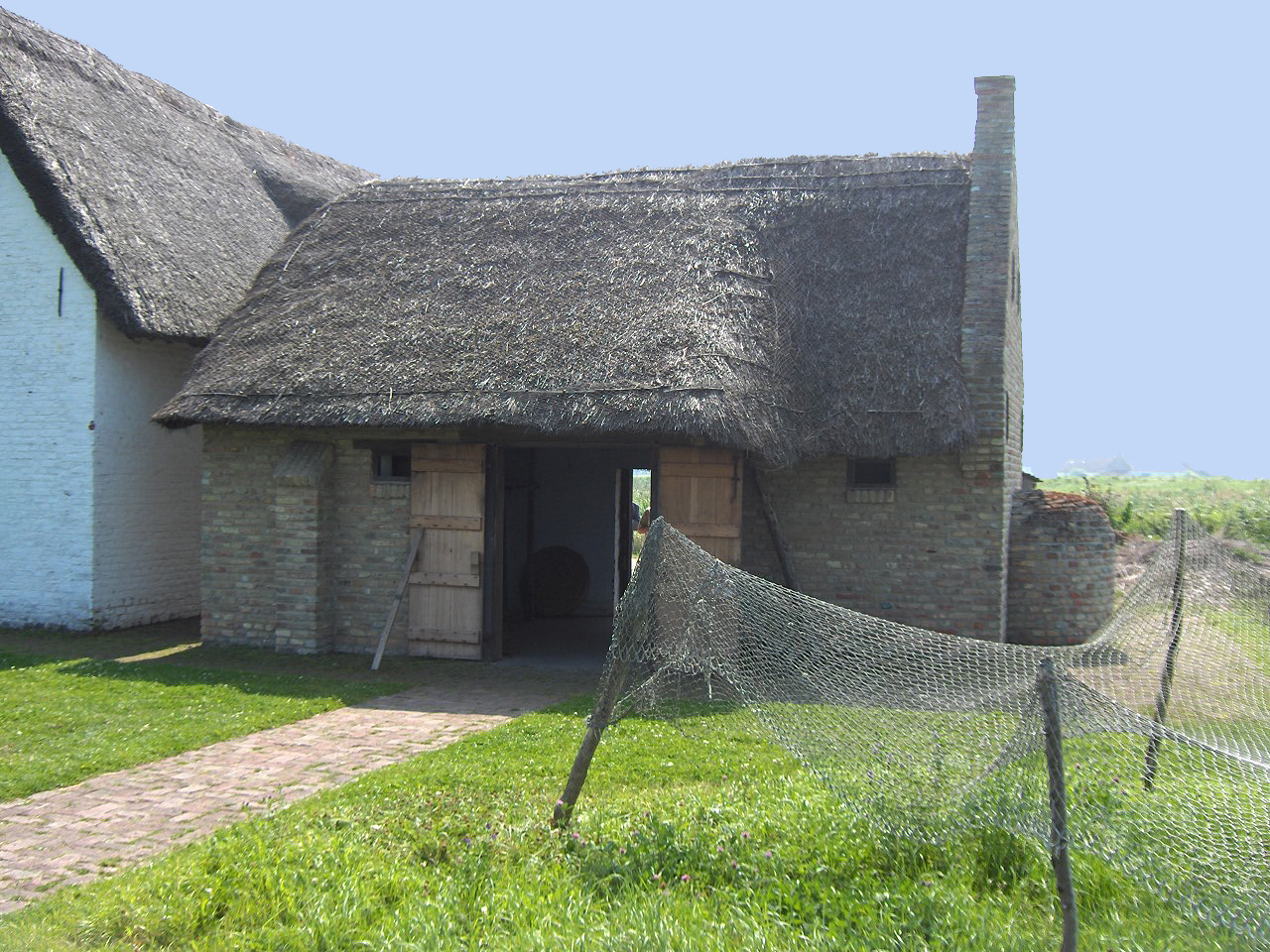
Reconstructed smokehouse at the medieval fishing village of Walraversijde, ca. 1465

== See also ==
- Artisanal fishing
- Community-supported fishery
- Fishing stage
- List of fishing villages
- Newfoundland outport
- Norwegian Fishing Village Museum
- Traditional fishing boat
