= Utskor =

Village in Bø Municipality, Norway

Utskor Utskår
- Village
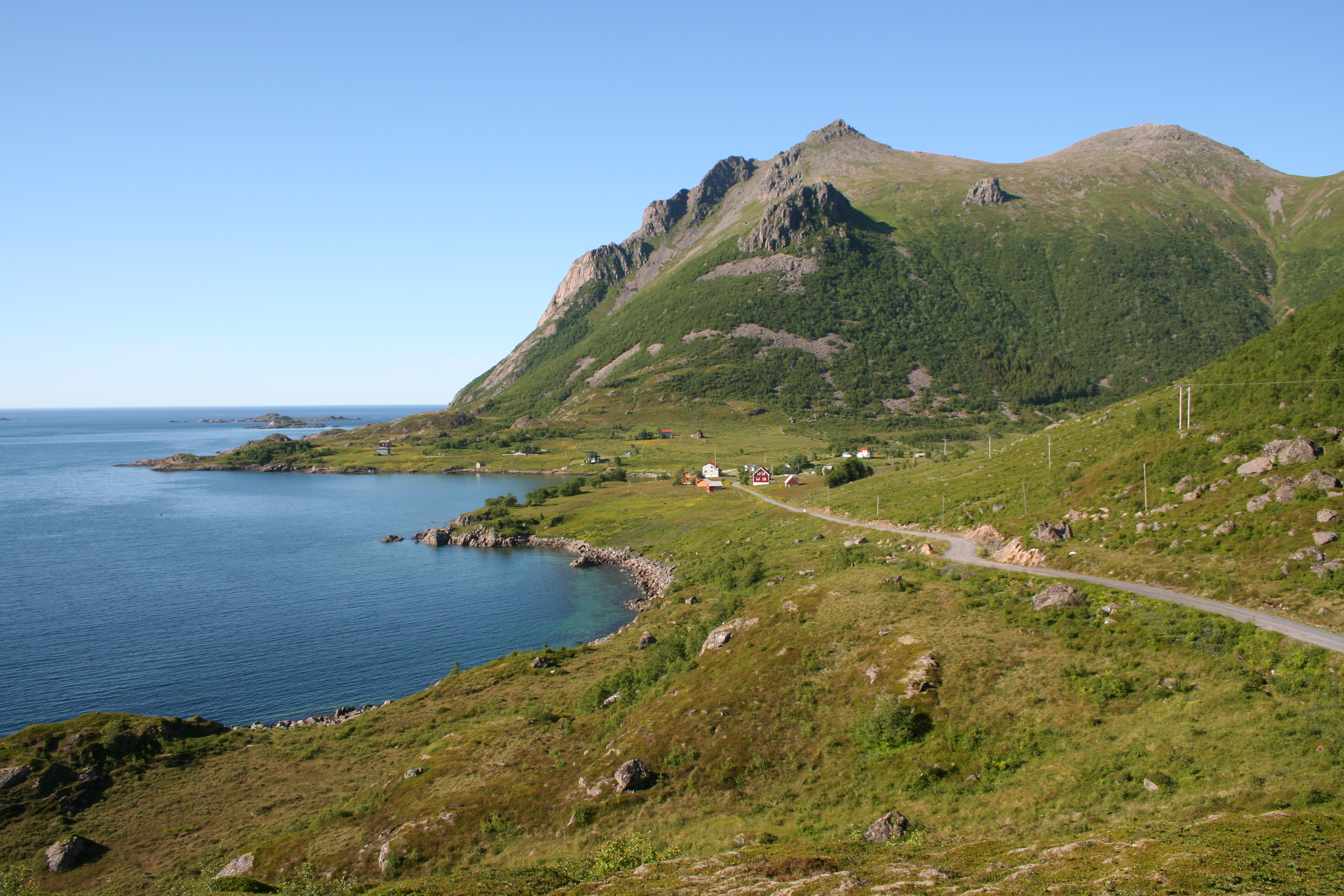
- Utskor seen from the south
- Interactive map of Utskor
- Location within Nordland Location within Norway
- Coordinates: 68.7978°N 14.6373°E
- Country: Norway
- Region: Northern Norway
- County: Nordland
- District: Vesterålen
- Municipality: Bø Municipality
- Elevation: 5 m (16 ft)
- Time zone: UTC+01:00 (CET)
  - Summer (DST): UTC+02:00 (CEST)
- Post Code: 8475 Straumsjøen

Utskor or Utskår is a village in Bø Municipality in Nordland county, Norway. The village is located on the eastern side of Malnesfjorden on the western part of the island of Langøya in the Vesterålen archipelago. The village of Eidet lies about 8 kilometres (5.0 mi) to the south, at the end of the fjord.

== History ==
The farm at Utskor is first mentioned in the 1567 census with two families living there. Archaeological findings dated to the Iron Age indicate that the place has been inhabited for a long time. The farm has historically been dependent on fishing, and it is located close to the rich fisheries on the continental shelf north of Vesterålen. Its peak population was reached at the beginning of the 20th century with about 15 families living in Utskor. As of 2022, the village has a permanent population of two, and a few summer residents.
