= Hovden, Nordland =

Village in Bø Municipality, Norway

Hovden
- Village
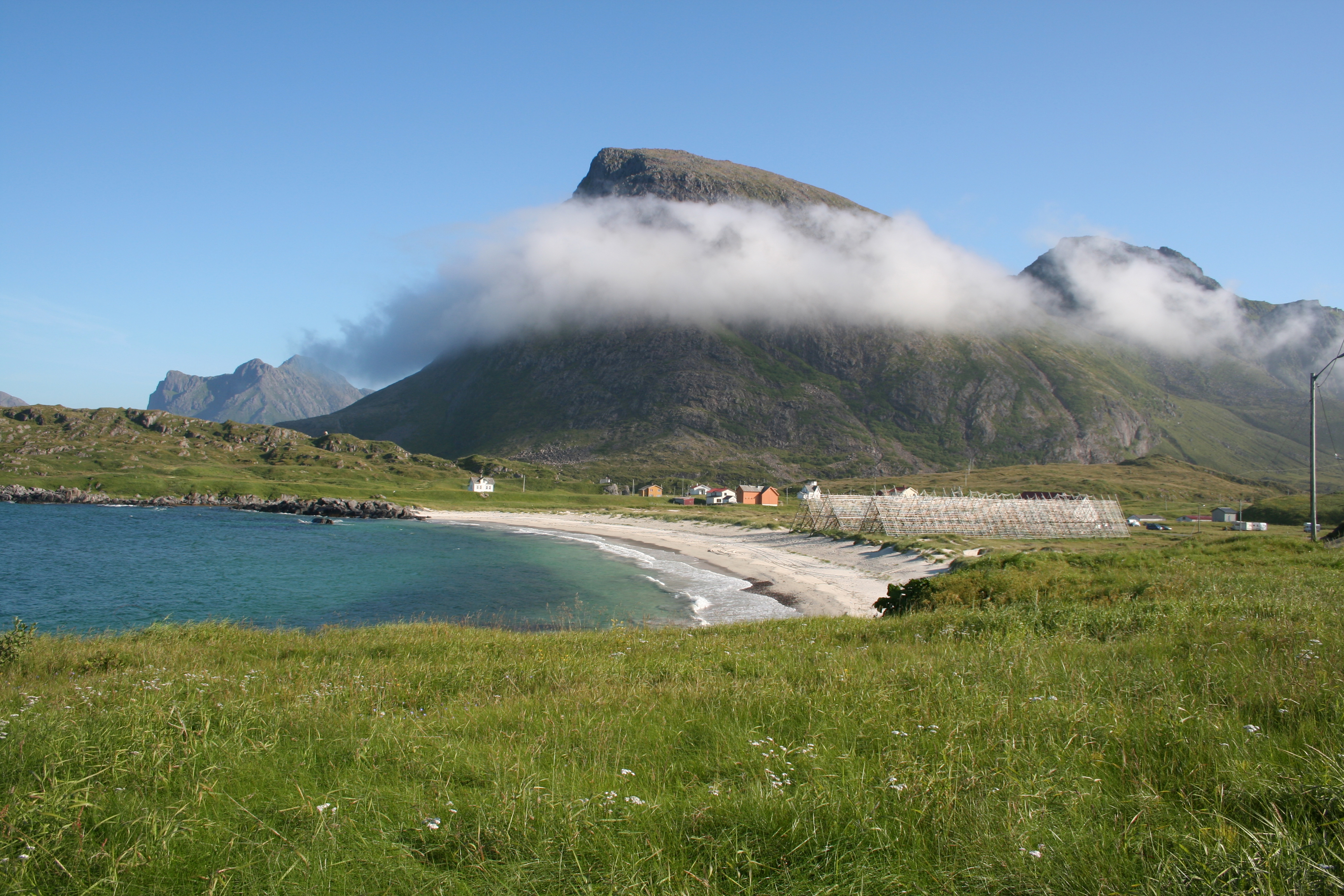
- Hovden, July 2006: Fog around the hill Malnesberget
- Interactive map of Hovden
- Location within Nordland Location within Norway
- Coordinates: 68.8125°N 14.5528°E
- Country: Norway
- Region: Northern Norway
- County: Nordland
- District: Vesterålen
- Municipality: Bø Municipality
- Elevation: 5 m (16 ft)
- Time zone: UTC+01:00 (CET)
  - Summer (DST): UTC+02:00 (CEST)
- Post Code: 8475 Straumsjøen

Hovden is a fishing village in Bø Municipality in Nordland county, Norway. The village is located at the northern tip of a peninsula on the island of Langøya, on the west side of the Malnesfjorden. The ocean lies to the north and west of the village. The road that goes to Hovden ends at the village. The habitation of Hovden, on the outermost point on a peninsula of the third-largest island in Norway (Langøya) is because of the closeness to the rich fishing banks off of the Vesterålen archipelago. Fish processing and fishing are the main employment of dwellers in Hovden.

Archaeological findings show that Hovden have been populated at least since 400 to 800 CE.

The village of Malnes lies to the south of Hovden. Malnes was the clerical center for the northern part of Bø until 1829 when Malnes Church was moved from Malnes to the village of Eidet. The name of the parish is still called Malnes.

== History ==
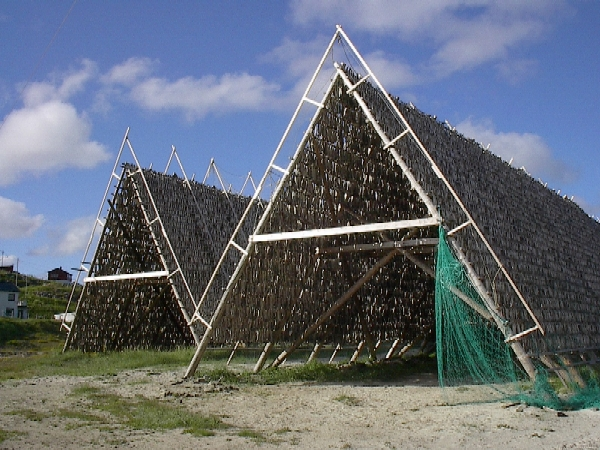
Fish Cathedral in Hovden

Hovden is a part of a line of old fishing communities in Vesterålen. Between the northern port of Andenes and the southwestern village of Bø there are several communities along the coastline with the common denominator of the closeness to the fishing banks off the Vesterålen archipelago. Hovden is one of these, and have to its advantage good harboring conditions and "clean" seas outside. Most of the coastline has a lot of rocks and skerries, so a good harbor was of vital significance to these communities.

Given the long settlement history, to maintain a large population is not possible in Hovden. From the census in 1666, nine men were registered as head of families in Hovden. Including families the total number of people could not have exceeded 60.

Agriculture in Hovden has always been limited. The main agricultural activity has been sheep and goat farming. But then as a supplement to the main income source: fishing. Conditions for farming large cattle are poor as the soil does not produce enough grass for larger cattle. Before potatoes came to Northern Norway (before the early 19th century) grains were grown in Hovden, we do not know of the type, but oats and barley have been grown in northern Norway since before the year 1000.

The fisheries have been and still are the most important economic activity in Hovden. Several different fisheries are important, but the most significant are the winter-fisheries between Christmas and Easter. These fisheries are also known under the name Lofotfisket. The Cod, gadus morhua migrate from the Barents Sea to spawn along the coast of Lofoten and have to pass Vesterålen on its way. Hovdens location is excellent given the short way to the areas where the fish are migrating south and northbound. For people living in Hovden, 80% of the total income was made during the first quarter of the year. The abundance of fish was far too much for consumption, and the fish was turned into dried fish and later salt fish, and then exported via Bergen to Europe.

The proximity to the fishing banks drew fishermen to Hovden. From the latter part of the 19th century, we know that in the winter months there could be up to 400 fishermen living on the small island across from the harbor (Holmen) and in the common landing place. They were living in cottages built for the purpose and under overturned boats.

During the latter part of the 19th century, Hovden came under ownership from what is called in Norwegian "væreier". Literally translated a "fishing community owner". These owners had total control of the economic activities in the community, and many had a monopoly on the buying and selling of the fish caught. This monopoly, and the fact that the investment in boats and nets became increasingly more expensive given the overall modernisation of the industry, made the fishermen dependent on the owner due to not being able to pay their debts with their income.

With the motorization of fishing vessels in the first two decades of the 20th century, the dependency on the "væreier" became even greater. With the motorization came a higher efficiency in catching fish, resulting in falling prices. Combined with the economic downturn in the 1930s, the profits from fishing dropped. Many of the owners went bankrupt and as a consequence the fishermen and their families had even less profit to live on. These events led to the formation of a fishermens union and in turn a state controlled buying monopoly who managed price formation. The reorganization of the fisheries made it more profitable for the fishermen.

== Etymology ==
"Hovden" gets its name from a high and steep cliff, now partly demolished, in the northwestern part of the village. The word derives from the Old Norse language, and the stem of the word is the same as in modern Norwegian/Danish "hode", Swedish "huvud", and English "head". This cliff is at the former southern entrance to the harbor. Now closed by a breakwater. The islets on the northernmost point of Hovden was called Maarsholmen.

"Malnes" means a headland with a shore made of rounded stones. A "moll" in Norwegian.

== Climate ==
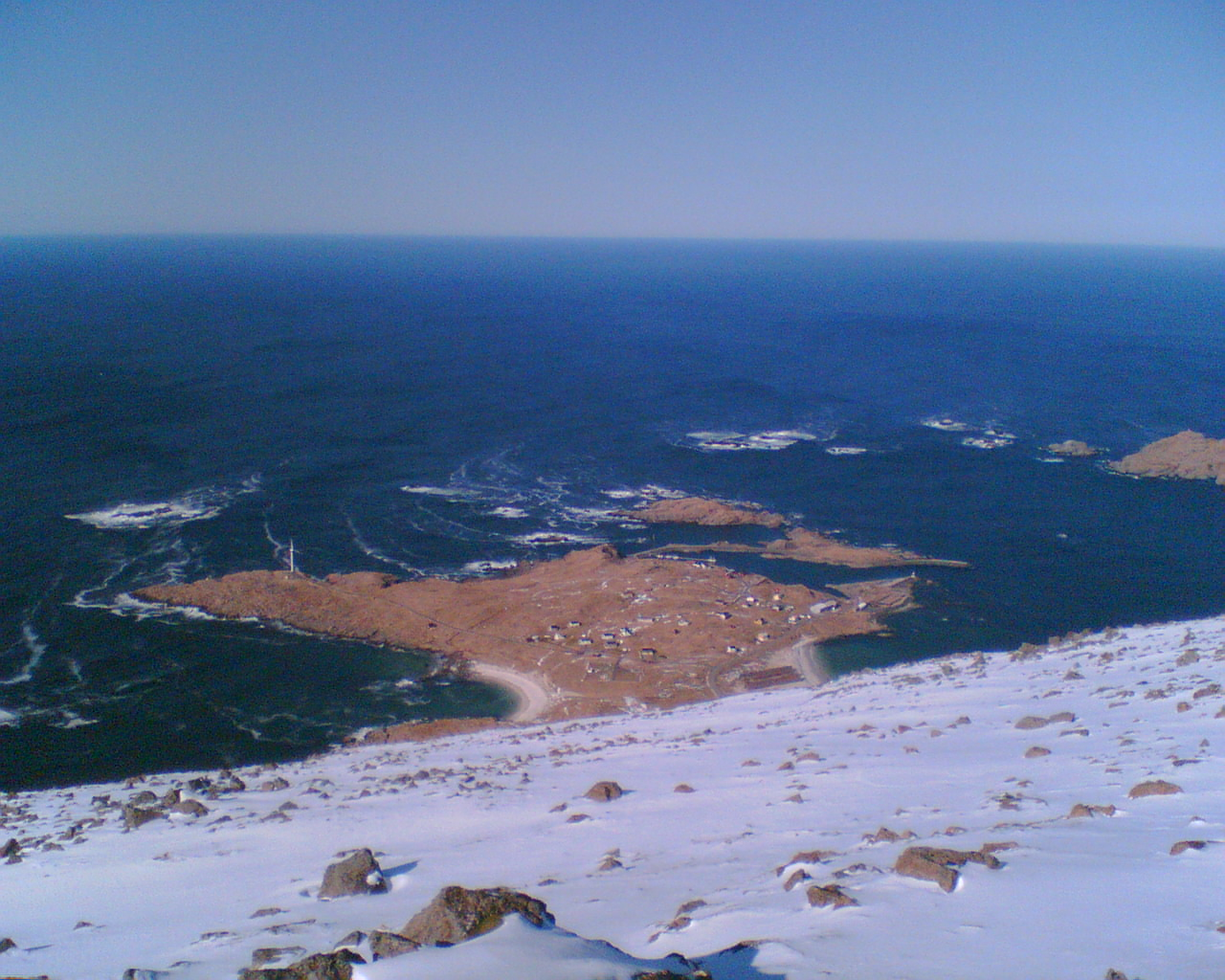
From Malnesberget 529 meters above sea level

Hovden's climate is a mild coastal climate. The winter is seldom cold. Average temperature in January is −1.4 °C (29.5 °F). The summer is seldom warm. Average temperature in August is 12.1 °C (53.8 °F). The precipitation is quite large with approximately 1,000 millimetres (39 in) per year. The climate is perfect for drying fish since the temperature is seldom below −2 °C (28 °F) or above 10 °C (50 °F) in the most important months between January and May.

The immediate closeness of the ocean makes the climate mild. April to June have the least precipitation, while the wet months are the autumn months. The dominating winds are the southwest winds (mild and moist) and the northeast winds (cold and dry). The North Atlantic Drift (extension of the Gulf Stream) is the reason for the mild climate. The continental shelf rises close to shore outside Vesterålen and have an insignificant impact on the life in the sea.

== Nature ==
The typical coastal landscape of Northern Norway is present in Hovden. The earth is barren, dominated by grass and heather. No wild woods are growing as a product of high exploitation by man, sheep and goats. The island of Frugga lies 1 kilometre (0.62 mi) north of Hovden. It is a nature reserve because of the large colony of puffin. To the south, the moraine of Raen stretches towards the village of Nykvåg. This moraine is the end moraine from a glacier ending in the sea here. This area is also a nature reserve.

Hovden is situated north of the Arctic Circle and has both the midnight sun and the winter darkness. The Midnight sun is present in Hovden between the end of May and the end of July. The polar night is between the end of November to mid-January.

== Culture ==
Being a northern Norwegian community, the same cultural influences are present as in other northern Norwegian communities. The culture is influenced by the mobility of Norwegians from the south to the north in the latter part of the 19th century. It has also received influence from the Sami culture along with Russian, Finnish, and Swedish culture as the migration in the northern part of the Scandinavian peninsula have been modestly restricted by state agencies until the 20th century and after the Russian Revolution.

The geographical location and the fact that the road was not built to Hovden until the 1950s made the dwellers self-contained and many of the cultural institutions was built by voluntary communal work. The freshwater-supply, street lights, the local Malnes Church, and a community house were all erected this way. Hovden had several Christian groups. A sports association was active in the 1960s and 1970s.

Hovden's population is now aging, the average age amongst the inhabitants is past 60. The Hovden Grendelag, consisting of younger migrated people from Hovden, is now the main actor in the local cultural field.
