= Malnesberget =

Mountain in Norway

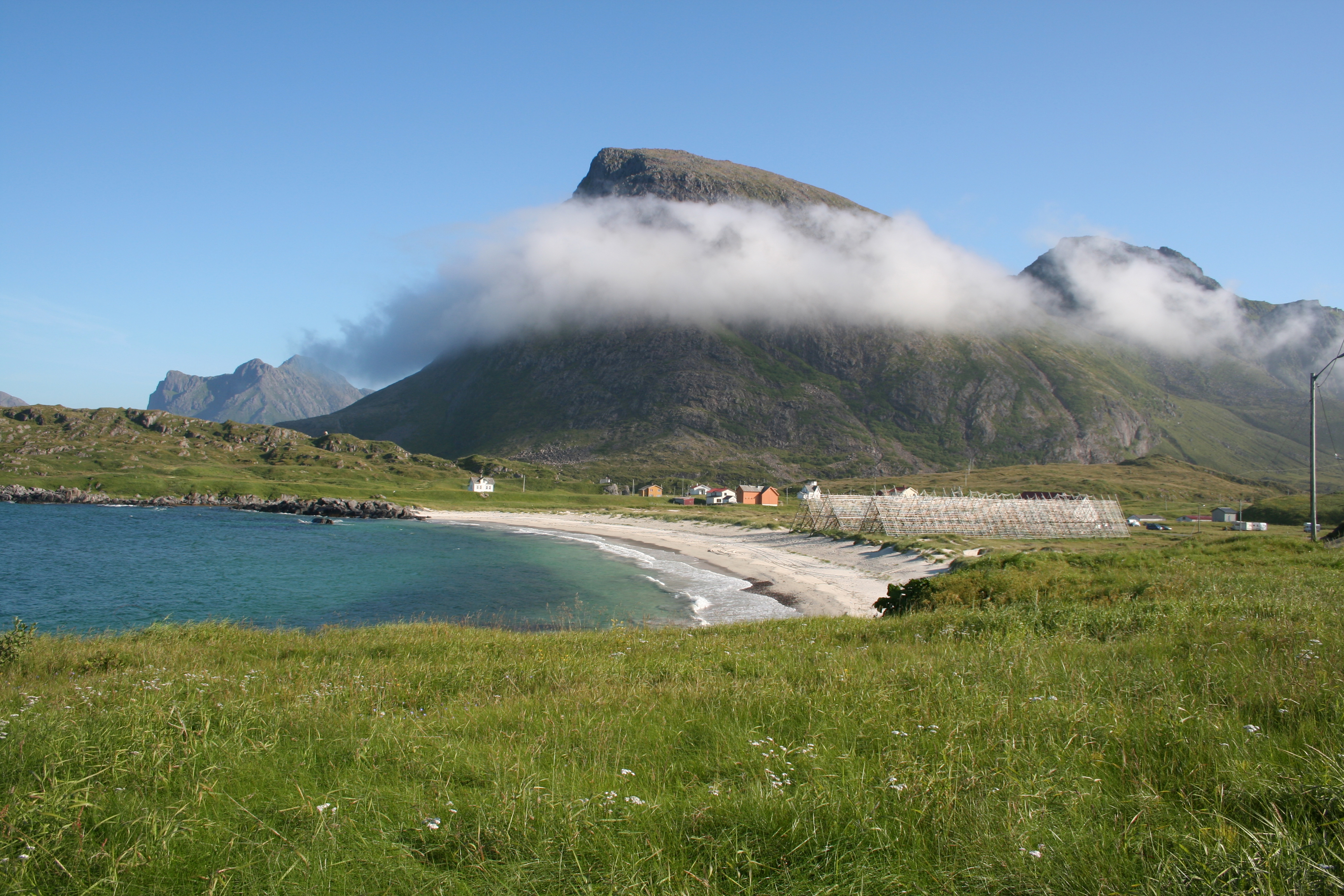
- Malnesberget seen from Hovden

Highest point
- Elevation: 529 m (1,736 ft)
- Coordinates: 68.7993°N 14.5662°E

Geography
- Interactive map of the mountain
- Location: Nordland, Norway

Climbing
- Easiest route: From below Tussen near Malnes

Malnesberget (lit. 'Malnes mountain') is a 529-meter (1,736 ft) mountain in Bø Municipality in Nordland county, Norway. The mountain stands on the western side of the large island of Langøya, along the Malnesfjorden, just south of the villages of Hovden and Malnes (hence the name). It can be climbed from the village of Malnes starting about 500 meters (1,600 ft) north of Tussen (elevation: 198 meters or 650 feet), a smaller hill located along Norwegian County Road 915, just west of Malnesberget.
