= Norwegian County Road 917 =

Road in Norway

County Road 917

Route information
- Length: 1.7 km (1.1 mi)

Major junctions
- South end: Fv915 at Eidet, Bø
- North end: Grimstad, Bø

Location
- Country: Norway
- Counties: Nordland

Highway system
- Roads in Norway; National Roads; County Roads

County Road 917 (Norwegian: Fylkesvei 917), also known as Grimstadveien (Grimstad Road), is a 1.7-kilometer (1.1 mi) road in Bø Municipality in Nordland County, Norway.

The road starts at the village of Eidet, where it branches off from County Road 915. It travels north, parallel to the coast, past the Klubben and Bøne farms, before terminating at the Grimstad farm. The road was widened and paved in 2014.
