= Kekova shipwreck =

World's oldest known shipwreck

The Kekova shipwreck is the oldest known shipwreck in the world, according to archaeologists. (Note: Prof Hakan Öniz from Akdeniz University, Turkey and Dr Karin Sowada from Macquarie University, Australia.) The shipwreck has been dated, by analysing the style of the pottery, to the Early Bronze Age, between c. 2700–2400 BC, which would make it older than the Dokos shipwreck in Greece.

The site was excavated in October of 2026. The remains of the shipwreck are located about 30 metres underwater off the coast of the island of Kekova (known as Dolichiste in Antiquity) in Antalya Province, Turkey. The cargo site consisted of over 30 ceramic amphorae and three stone anchors, with some amphorae still containing traces of their contents. One amphora appeared to be a Bronze Age container for transporting olive oil and wine.

The ship is estimated to have been a trade vessel about 10 metres long. It likely began its journey on the eastern coast of the Mediterranean Sea, bound for either Troy or Minoan Crete. The ship itself has not survived to the present.

Outside experts were intrigued by the Kekova find but cautious about calling it "the world’s oldest shipwreck". Justin Leidwanger of Stanford noted that the evidence is thin: a dozen or so jars and three anchors that are hard to date, with no hull to carbon date. Sean Kingsley suggested the jars may simply have been thrown overboard, and others pointed to similar amphoras from much later wrecks.
