= Kekova =

Small Turkish island near Demre

Coordinates: 36°10′50″N 29°52′40″E

Kekova Island
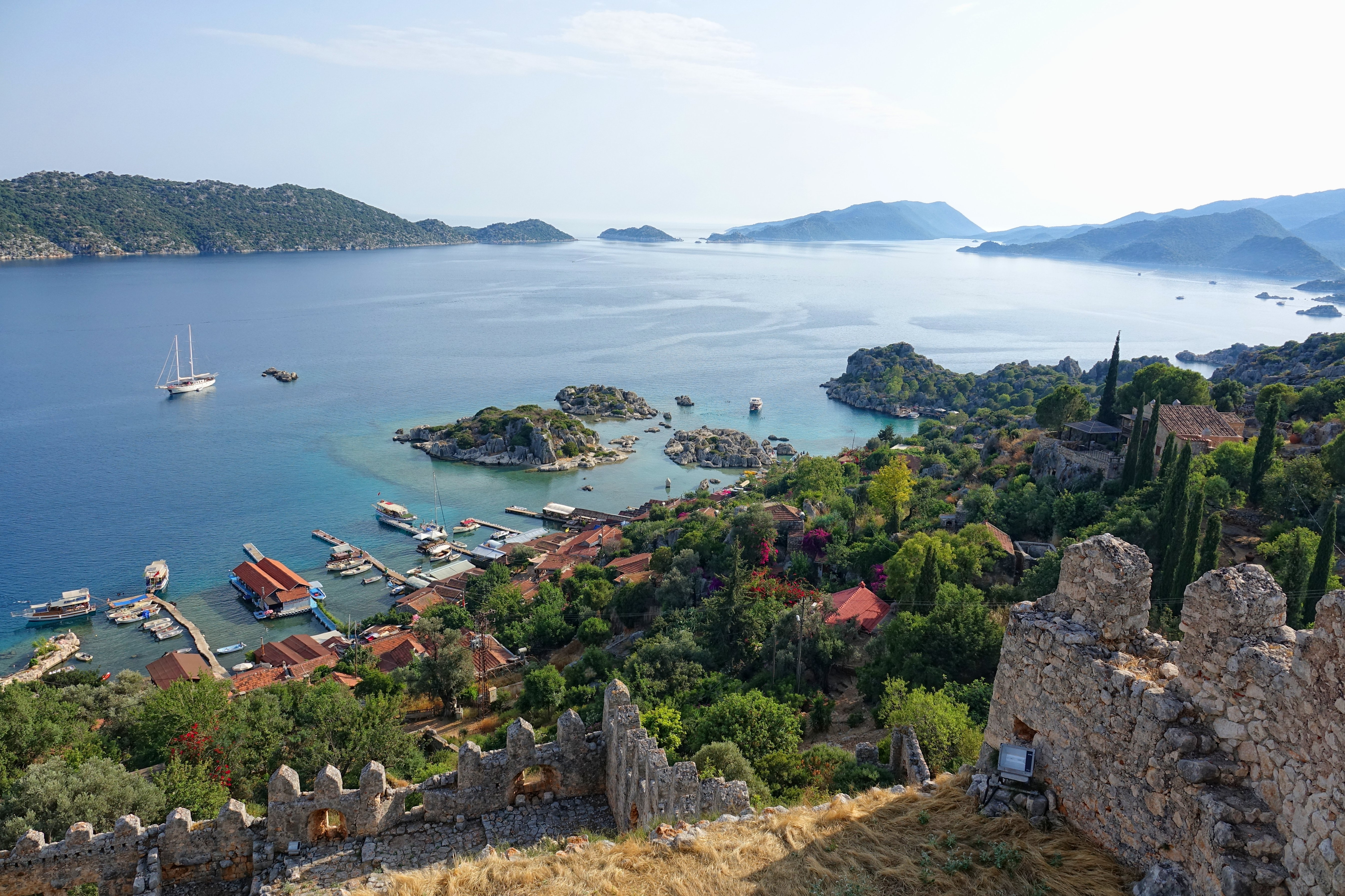
- Kekova island seen in the top left, and Kaleköy village (ancient Simena).

- Location within Turkey

Geography
- Location: Antalya Province

Administration
- Turkey
- Province: Antalya

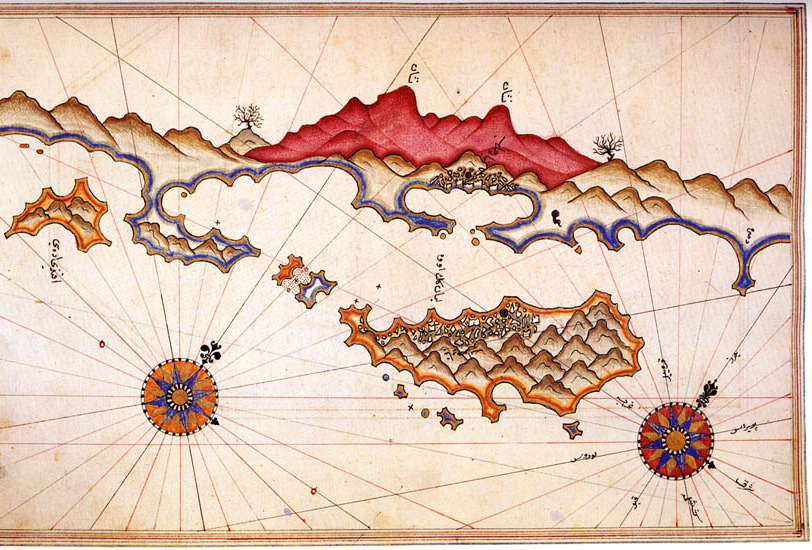
Historic map of Kekova by Piri Reis

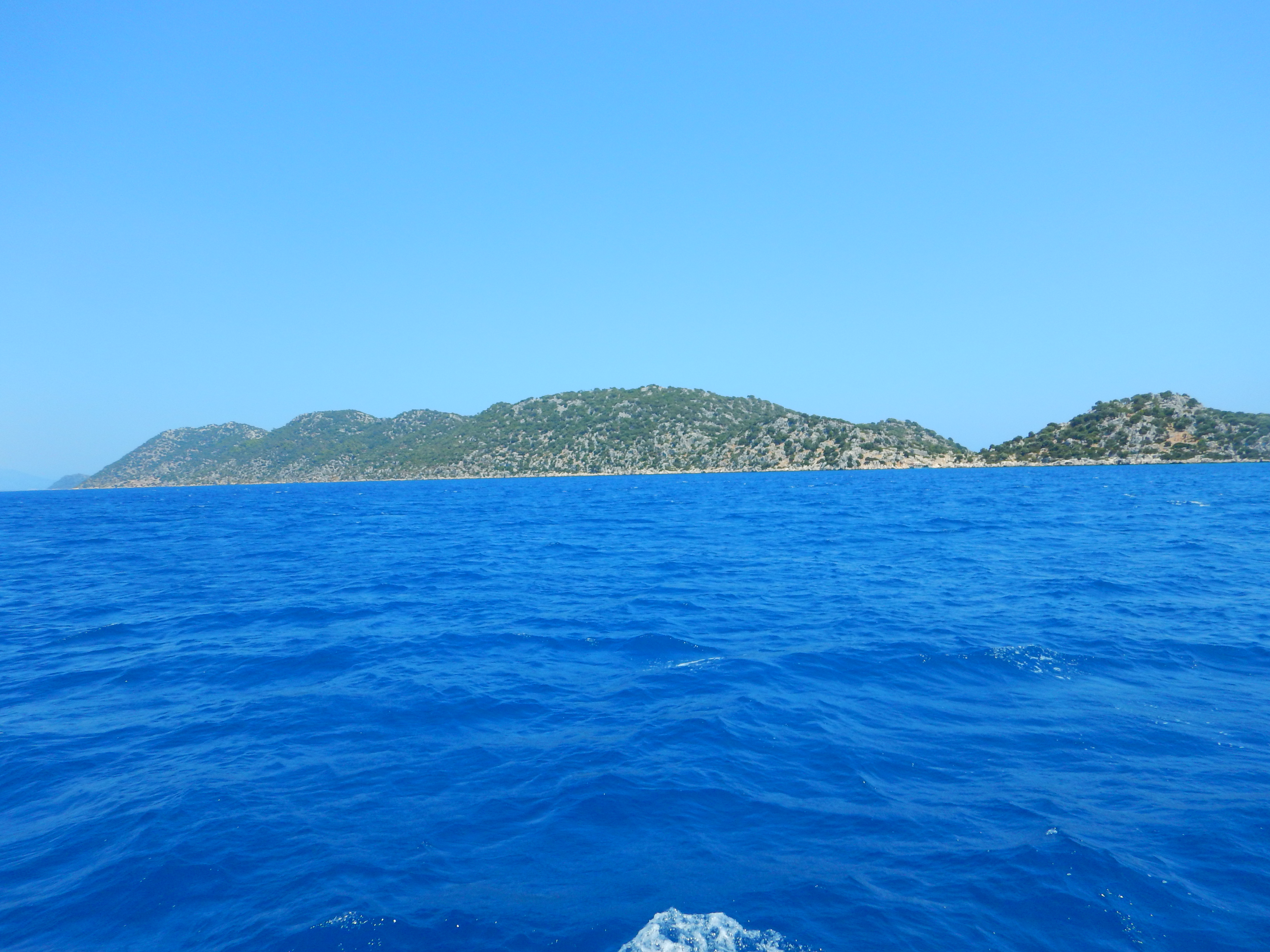
Kekova Island seen from the west

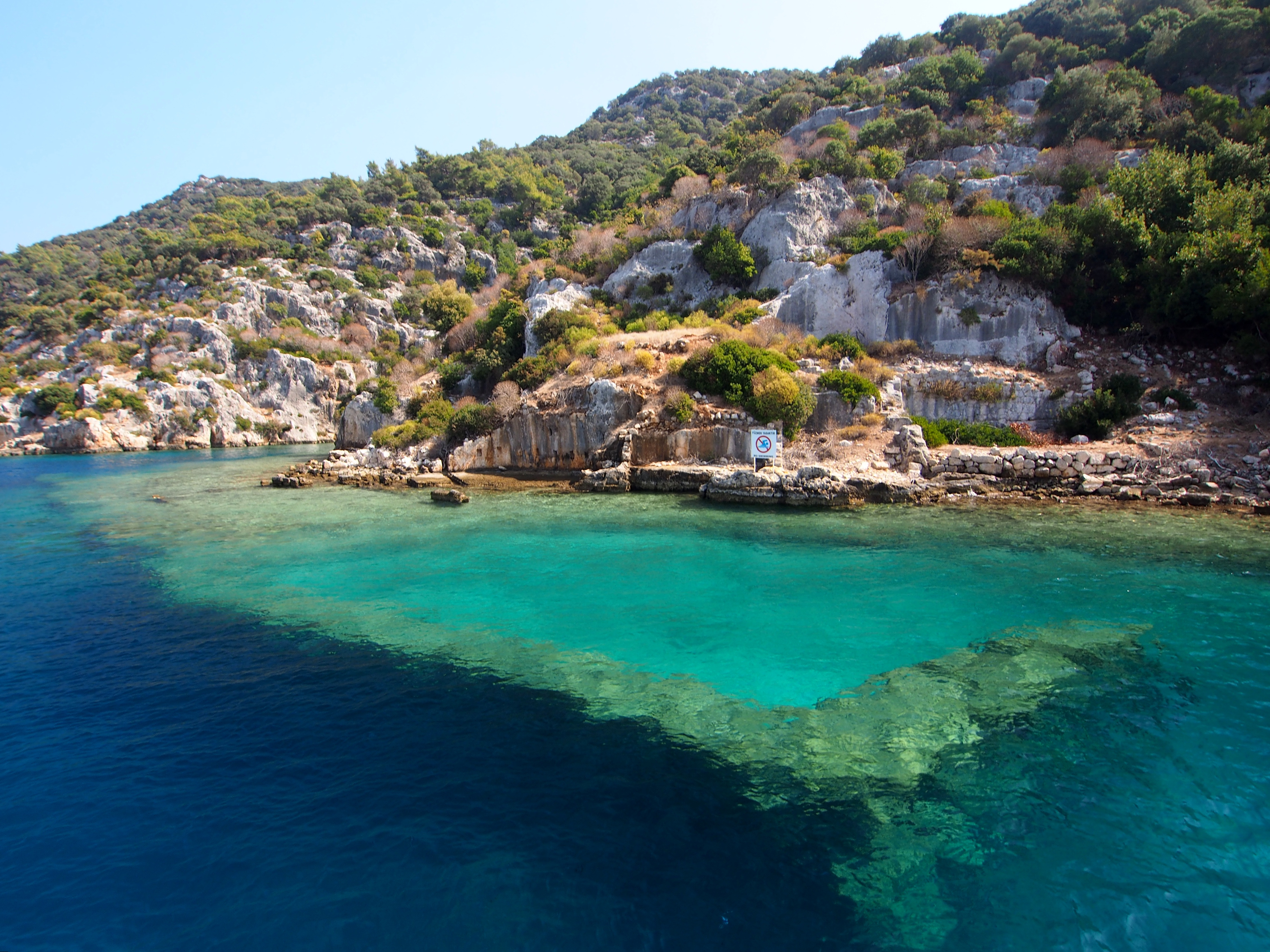
Ruins under the water on the shores of Kekova Island

Kekova is a small Turkish island near Demre (Demre is the Lycian town of Myra) district of Antalya province which faces the villages of Kaleköy (ancient Simena) and Üçağız (ancient Teimioussa). Kekova has an area of 4.5 km^{2} (2 sq mi) and is uninhabited. It was known as Dolichiste (Greek: Δολιχίστη) in antiquity.

== Island ==
After the Italian occupation of Kastelorizo, Kekova – which at that time was temporarily inhabited during summer because of wood harvest – was disputed between Italy and Turkey. The 1932 Convention between Italy and Turkey assigned it to Turkey.

On its northern side are the partly sunken ruins of Dolchiste/Dolikisthe, an ancient town which was destroyed by an earthquake during the 2nd century.

Rebuilt and still flourishing during the Byzantine Empire period, it was finally abandoned because of Arab incursions.

The Tersane (meaning "dockyard", as its bay was the site of an ancient city Xera and dockyard, with the ruins of a Byzantine church) is at the northwest of the island.

The Kekova region was declared a specially protected area on 18 January 1990 by the Turkish Ministry of Environment and Forest. All kinds of diving and swimming were prohibited and were subjected to special permits from governmental offices. In later years the prohibition has been lifted, except for the part where the sunken city is located.

The Kekova region is 260 km^{2} (100 sq mi) and encompasses the island of Kekova, the villages of Kaleköy and Üçağız and the four ancient towns of Simena, Aperlae, Dolchiste and Teimioussa.

Kaleköy (locally just "Kale") (ancient Simena) is a Lycian site on the Turkish coast. It is a small village with the partly sunken ruins of Aperlae and a castle. Access to the village is possible only by sea.

Üçağız (ancient name, Teimioussa) is a village one km from Kaleköy, north of a small bay by the same name, with the ruins of Teimioussa to the east. The name "Üçağız" means "three mouths", referring to the three exits to open sea.

In 2026, an Early Bronze Age shipwreck was discovered off the coast of Kekova. Dating back 4,700 years, to 2700-2400 BC, it is the oldest known shipwrecks in the world.

== Sources ==
- Bertarelli, L.V. (1929). Guida d'Italia, Vol. XVII (in Italian). Milano: Consociazione Turistica Italiana.
