= Norwegian County Road 915 =

County road in Bo, Nordland County, Norway

County Road 915

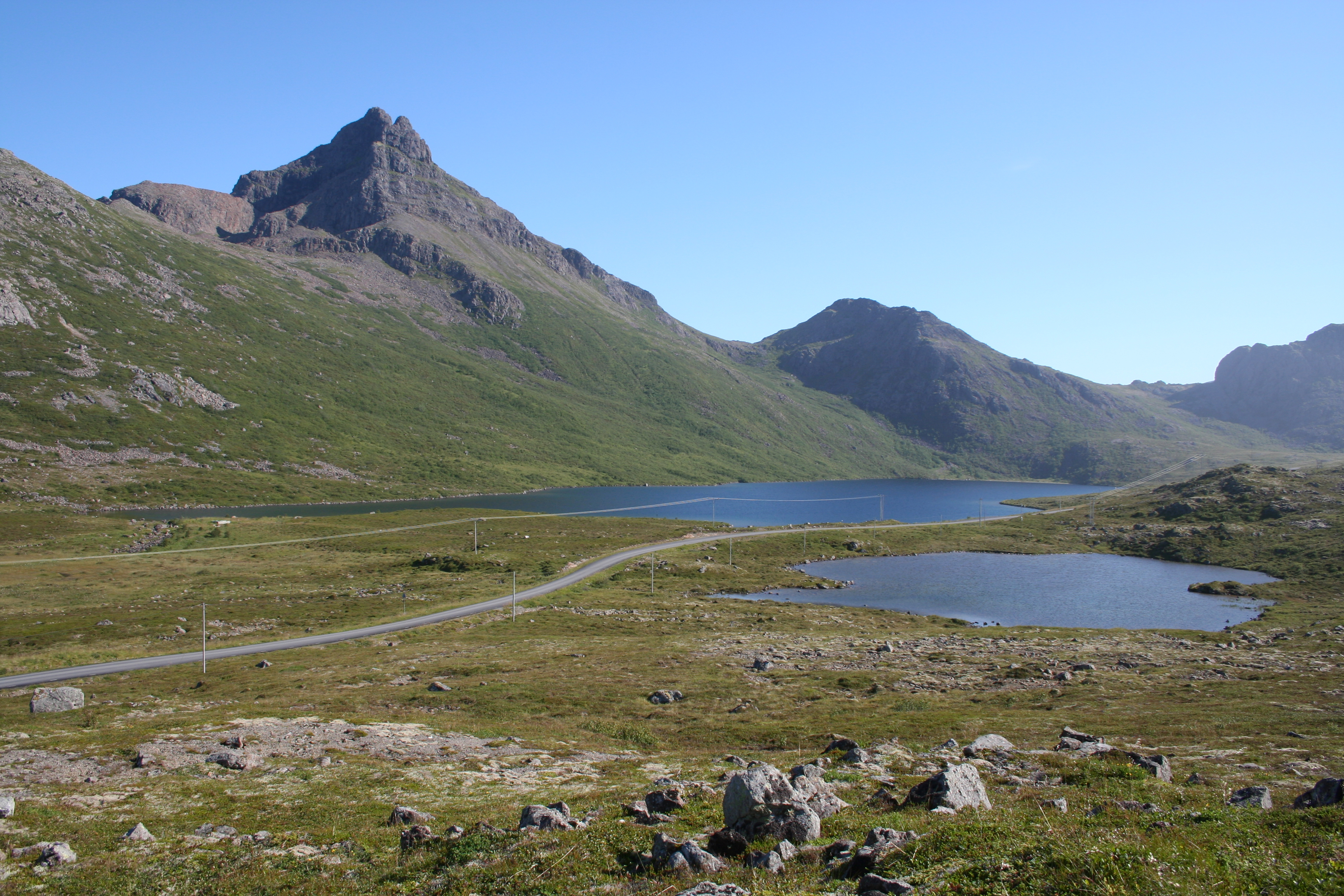
- County Road 915 near Nykvåg

Route information
- Length: 17.49 km (10.87 mi)

Major junctions
- West end: Fv820 at Rise, Bø
- Fv917 at Eidet; Fv916 at Nykvåg
- North end: Hovden, Bø

Location
- Country: Norway
- Counties: Nordland

Highway system
- Roads in Norway; National Roads; County Roads

County Road 915 (Norwegian: Fylkesvei 915) is a 17.49-kilometer (10.87 mi) road in Bø Municipality in Nordland County, Norway.

The road starts in the village of Rise, where it branches off from County Road 820, and then crosses the low isthmus to the village of Eidet, where County Road 917 branches off north towards the village of Grimstad. It then follows the sea to Sandvika, where it turns inland and runs along the west side of Bufjellet hill (211 meters or 692 feet) before descending to the village of Nykvåg, where County Road 916 branches off east to Vågen. The road then continues further along the water, past Malnes to the village of Hovden, where it terminates.

The road becomes very narrow below Tussen hill (198 meters or 650 feet) on the border of the Nyke/Tussen Nature Reserve before it reaches Hovden. This stretch of the road is also exposed to rockfalls and was closed by such a rockfall in 2014.
