= Malnes =

Village in Bø Municipality, Norway

- Village
- Interactive map of Malnes
- Location within Nordland Location within Norway
- Coordinates: 68.8069°N 14.5629°E
- Country: Norway
- Region: Northern Norway
- County: Nordland
- District: Vesterålen
- Municipality: Bø Municipality
- Elevation: 12 m (39 ft)
- Time zone: UTC+01:00 (CET)
  - Summer (DST): UTC+02:00 (CEST)
- Post Code: 8475 Straumsjøen

Malnes is a small village in Bø Municipality in Nordland county, Norway. The village is located along the mouth of Malnesfjorden in the northwest part the island of Langøya. Malnes is now considered the southwestern part of the village of Hovden, but it was formerly a separate farming settlement.

== Geography ==
The hill Malnesberget (529 meters or 1,736 feet) rises south of Malnes. Norwegian County Road 915 connects Malnes to Hovden in the north and to the village of Nykvåg to the southwest.

== History ==
Malnes Church was established at Malnes in the Middle Ages, and Malnes served as the clerical center of the former parish of Malnes in the Bø ecclesiastical district (Bø herred). In 1829, Malnes Church was moved from Malnes to the village of Eidet, but it is still known as Malnes Church. Today it is part of parish of Bø og Malnes.
