= Malnes Church =

- Malnes kirke
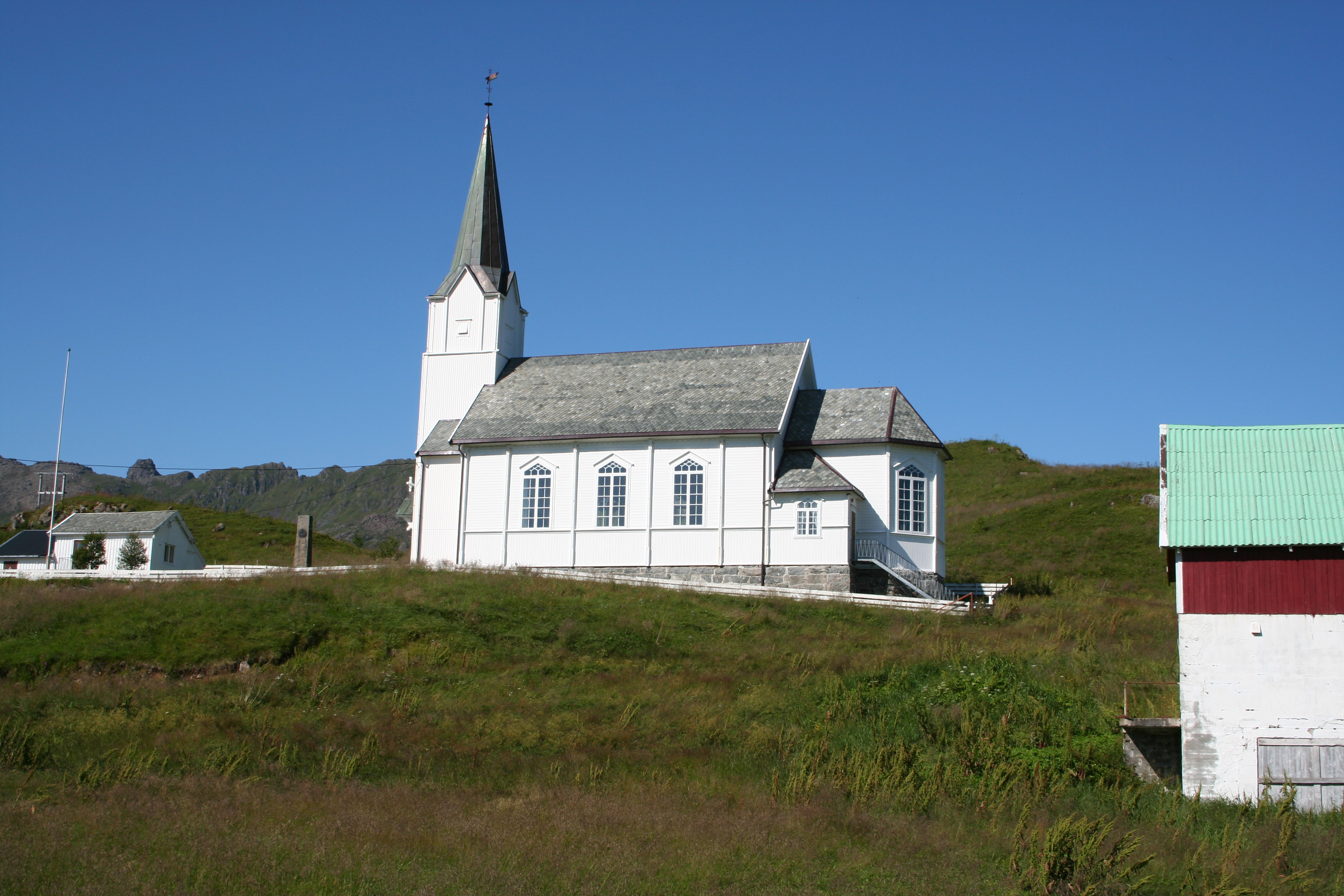
- View of the church
- Malnes Church
- 68.7391215°N 14.5888379°E
- Location: Bø Municipality, Nordland
- Country: Norway
- Denomination: Church of Norway
- Churchmanship: Evangelical Lutheran

History
- Status: Parish church
- Founded: 16th century
- Consecrated: 7 April 1895

Architecture
- Functional status: Active
- Architect: Ole Scheistrøen
- Architectural type: Long church
- Completed: 1895 (131 years ago)

Specifications
- Capacity: 320
- Materials: Wood

Administration
- Diocese: Sør-Hålogaland
- Deanery: Vesterålen prosti
- Parish: Bø og Malnes
- Norwegian Cultural Heritage Site
- Type: Church
- Status: Not protected
- ID: 84381

Malnes Church (Norwegian: Malnes kirke) is a parish church of the Church of Norway in Bø Municipality in Nordland county, Norway. It is located in the village of Eide. It is one of the churches for the Bø og Malnes parish which is part of the Vesterålen prosti (deanery) in the Diocese of Sør-Hålogaland. The white, wooden church was built in a long church style in 1895 using plans drawn up by the architect Ole Scheistrøen. The church seats about 320 people.

== History ==
The earliest existing historical records of the church date back to the year 1589, but the church was likely founded in the early 1500s. The first church at Malnes, near the village of Hovden. Around the year 1700, a new church building was constructed. It was likely a rectangular log building without a tower.

In 1814, this church served as an election church (Norwegian: valgkirke). Together with more than 300 other parish churches across Norway, it was a polling station for elections to the 1814 Norwegian Constituent Assembly which wrote the Constitution of Norway. This was Norway's first national elections. Each church parish was a constituency that elected people called "electors" who later met together in each county to elect the representatives for the assembly that was to meet at Eidsvoll Manor later that year.

By the early-1820s, the church had fallen into disrepair and was demolished in 1822. Rather than rebuilding on the same site, the church was rebuilt about 10 kilometres (6.2 mi) to the south in the village of Eide. The old cemetery at Malnes was in use until 1900. The church needed to be expanded by the end of the century, so in 1894 it was torn down and replaced with a new building. The new church was built at Eide and it was consecrated on 7 April 1895 by Bishop Peter W. K. Bøckman, Sr.

== See also ==
- List of churches in Sør-Hålogaland
