= Eidet, Bø =

Village in Bø Municipality, Norway

Eidet Eide
- Village
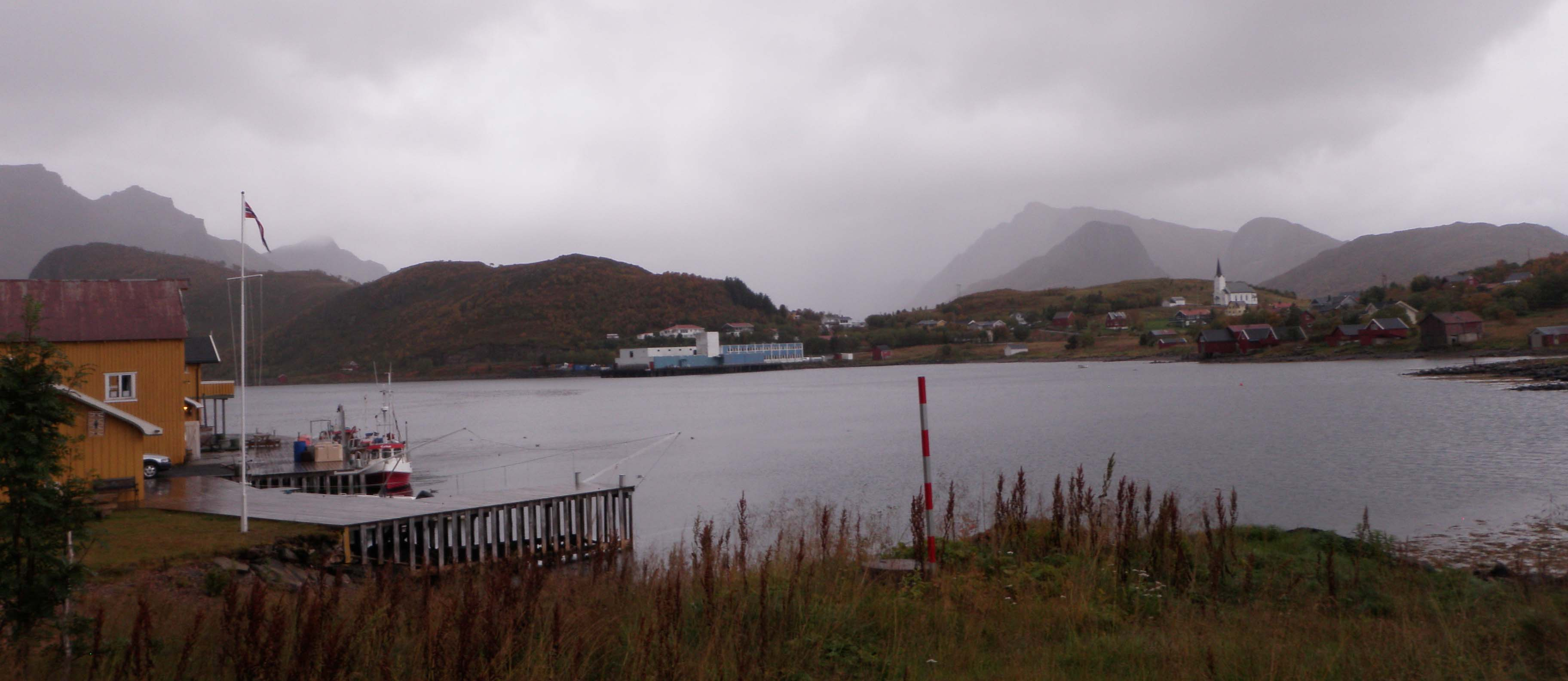
- View of the village
- Interactive map of Eidet
- Location within Nordland Location within Norway
- Coordinates: 68.7383°N 14.5857°E
- Country: Norway
- Region: Northern Norway
- County: Nordland
- District: Vesterålen
- Municipality: Bø Municipality
- Elevation: 9 m (30 ft)
- Time zone: UTC+01:00 (CET)
  - Summer (DST): UTC+02:00 (CEST)
- Post Code: 8475 Straumsjøen

Eidet is a village in Bø Municipality in Nordland county, Norway. The village is located on the large island of Langøya in the Vesterålen archipelago. The village is located about 9 kilometres (5.6 mi) northeast of the municipal centre of Straume. Malnes Church was moved here from the small village of Malnes, just south of the village of Hovden in 1829.

Eide is connected to the village of Nykvåg to the north and to the village of Rise to the south by Norwegian County Road 915.
