= Malnesfjord =

Fjord in Nordland, Norway

Malnesfjorden
- Malnesfjord
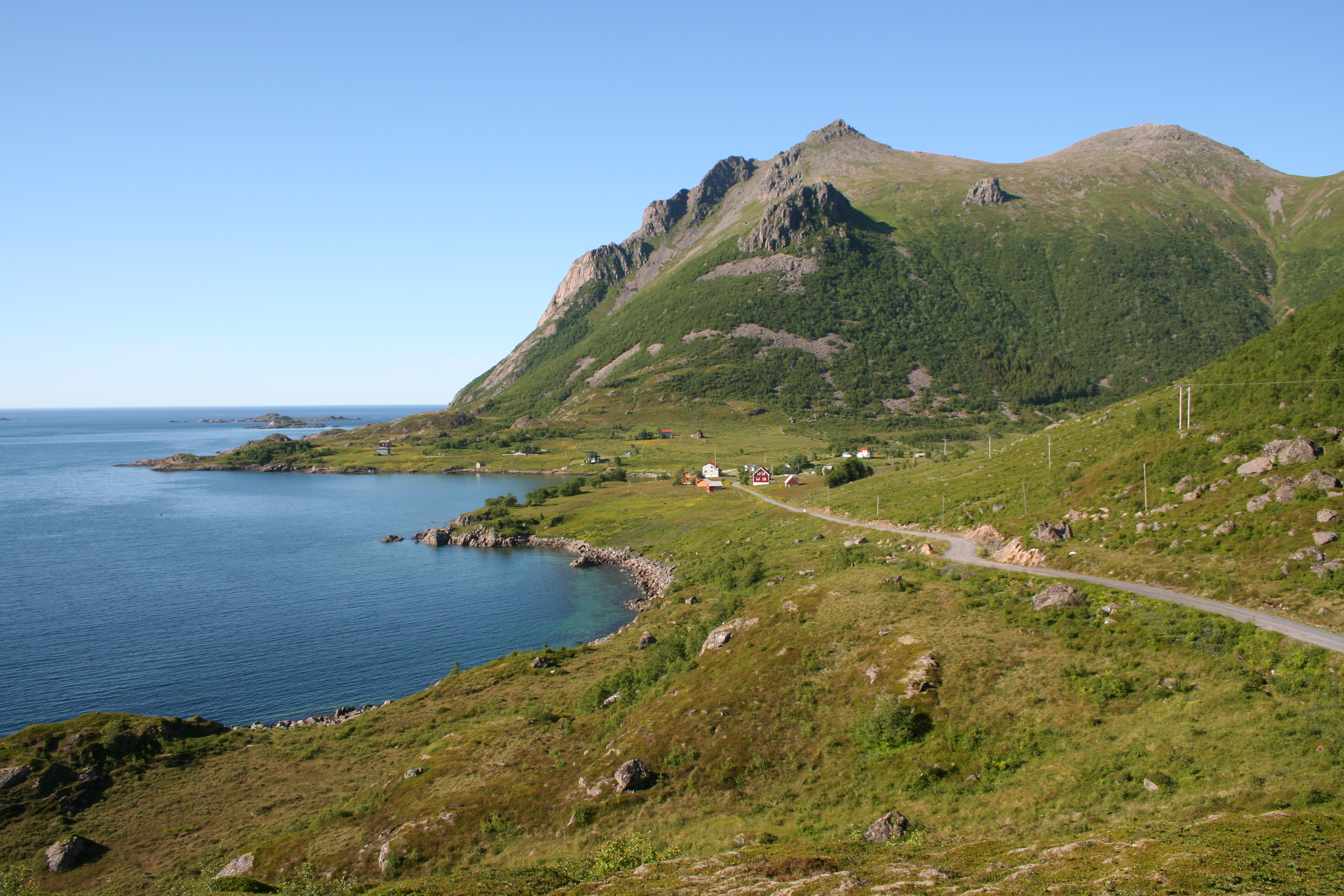
- View of Utskor, on the northeast shore of Malnesfjord
- Interactive map of the fjord
- Location: Nordland county, Norway
- Coordinates: 68.7934°N 14.6111°E
- Type: Fjord
- Basin countries: Norway
- Max. length: 6.5 kilometres (4.0 mi)
- Max. width: 1.5 kilometres (0.93 mi)
- Max. depth: 161 metres (528 ft)

Malnesfjorden (transl. Malnes Fjord) is a fjord in Bø Municipality in Nordland county, Norway. The 6.5-kilometre (4.0 mi) long fjord is located between two peninsulas on the northwestern part of the island of Langøya in the Vesterålen archipelago. The inlet to the fjord lies between the village of Hovden to the northwest and the Godvika inlet to the northeast. The fjord reaches a depth of 161 meters (528 ft) southwest of Godvika. The mountain Malnesberget lies on the western shore of the fjord.
