= Nyke/Tussen Nature Reserve =

Protected area in Norway

- Nyke/Tussen naturreservat
- IUCN category Ia (strict nature reserve)
- Interactive map of Nyke/Tussen Nature Reserve
- Location: Vesterålen, Norway
- Nearest city: Nykvåg and Hovden
- Coordinates: 68°47′33.9″N 14°30′49.3″E
- Area: 168.9 ha (417 acres)
- Established: 2002

The Nyke/Tussen Nature Reserve (Norwegian: Nyke/Tussen naturreservat) is located in Bø Municipality in Nordland county, Norway.

The nature reserve lies north of the Nykvåg/Nykan Nature Reserve and south of the Frugga Nature Reserve, and it includes a pebble beach between the villages of Nykvåg and Hovden. The reserve covers an area of 168.9 hectares (417 acres), of which 132.8 hectares (328 acres) is sea. The area is protected in order to safeguard one of the largest and geomorphologically best-formed pebble beaches in Nordland. The nature reserve was established on December 6, 2002.
