= Tyberissus =

Ancient Lycian town

Coordinates: 36°12′55″N 29°51′23″E

Tyberissus or Tyberissos, also Tyberisus or Tyberisos (Ancient Greek: Τυβερισσός), was an inland town of ancient Lycia, near the ancient settlement of Teimiussa that functioned as its port. The name is not attested in history, but is derived from epigraphic and other evidence. This combination of harbor and inland location is the focus of archaeological exploration. Among the finds are tombs with Lycian inscriptions. Coins inscribed "ΤΥ" of typical Lycian type were probably minted here.

Its site is located near the modern town of Tirmısın, Asiatic Turkey.

== Literature ==
- Martin Zimmermann: Hafen und Hinterland. Wege der Akkulturation an der lykischen Küste. Vorbericht über die Feldforschungen in den zentrallykischen Orten Tyberissos und Timiussa in den Jahren 1999–2001. In: Mitteilungen des Deutschen Archäologischen Instituts, Abteilung Istanbul. Volume 53, 2003, pp. 265–312. (in German)
