= Norwegian County Road 916 =

Road in Nordland, Norway

County Road 916

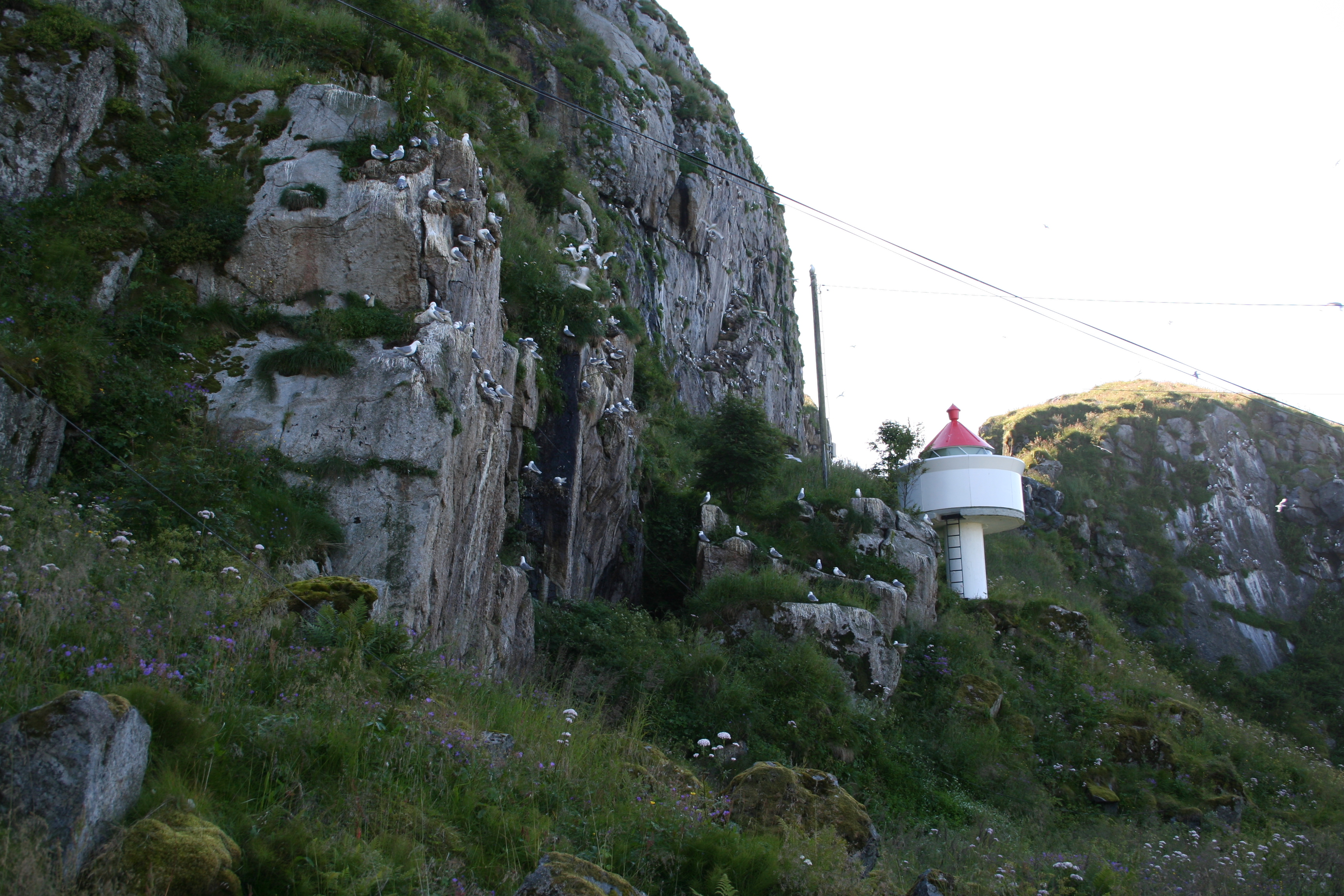
- Bird mountain in Nykvåg in Bø, Nordland, Norway.

Route information
- Length: 0.79 km (0.49 mi; 2,600 ft)

Major junctions
- East end: Fv915 at Nykvåg, Bø
- West end: Nykvåg Quay, Bø

Location
- Country: Norway
- Counties: Nordland

Highway system
- Roads in Norway; National Roads; County Roads

County Road 916 (Norwegian: Fylkesvei 916), also known as Nykvågveien (Nykvåg Road) or Vågveien (Bay Road), is a 0.79-kilometer (0.49 mi) asphalt road in Bø Municipality in Nordland County, Norway. The name Nykvågveien is also shared with County Road 915.

The road starts at the village of Nykvåg, where it branches off from County Road 915. It circles southwest and then northeast around the bay at Nykvåg, ending at Nykvåg Quay (Nykvåg kai). There is a bird cliff along the road that is part of the Nykvåg/Nykan Nature Reserve.
