= Frugga Nature Reserve =

Protected area in Norway

- Frugga naturreservat
- IUCN category Ia (strict nature reserve)
- Interactive map of Frugga Nature Reserve
- Location: Vesterålen, Norway
- Nearest city: Hovden
- Coordinates: 68°49′47.2″N 14°33′48.5″E
- Area: 102.5 ha (253 acres)
- Established: 2002

The Frugga Nature Reserve (Norwegian: Frugga naturreservat) is located in Bø Municipality in Nordland county, Norway.

The nature reserve lies north of the Nykvåg/Nykan and Nyke/Tussen nature reserves, and covers an area of 102.5 hectares (253 acres), of which 75.2 hectares (186 acres) is sea. It includes the small island of Frugga and many small skerries. The area is protected in order to safeguard an Atlantic puffin nesting area. The nature reserve was established on December 6, 2002.
