= Kaleköy =

Village of the Demre district in the Antalya Province of Turkey

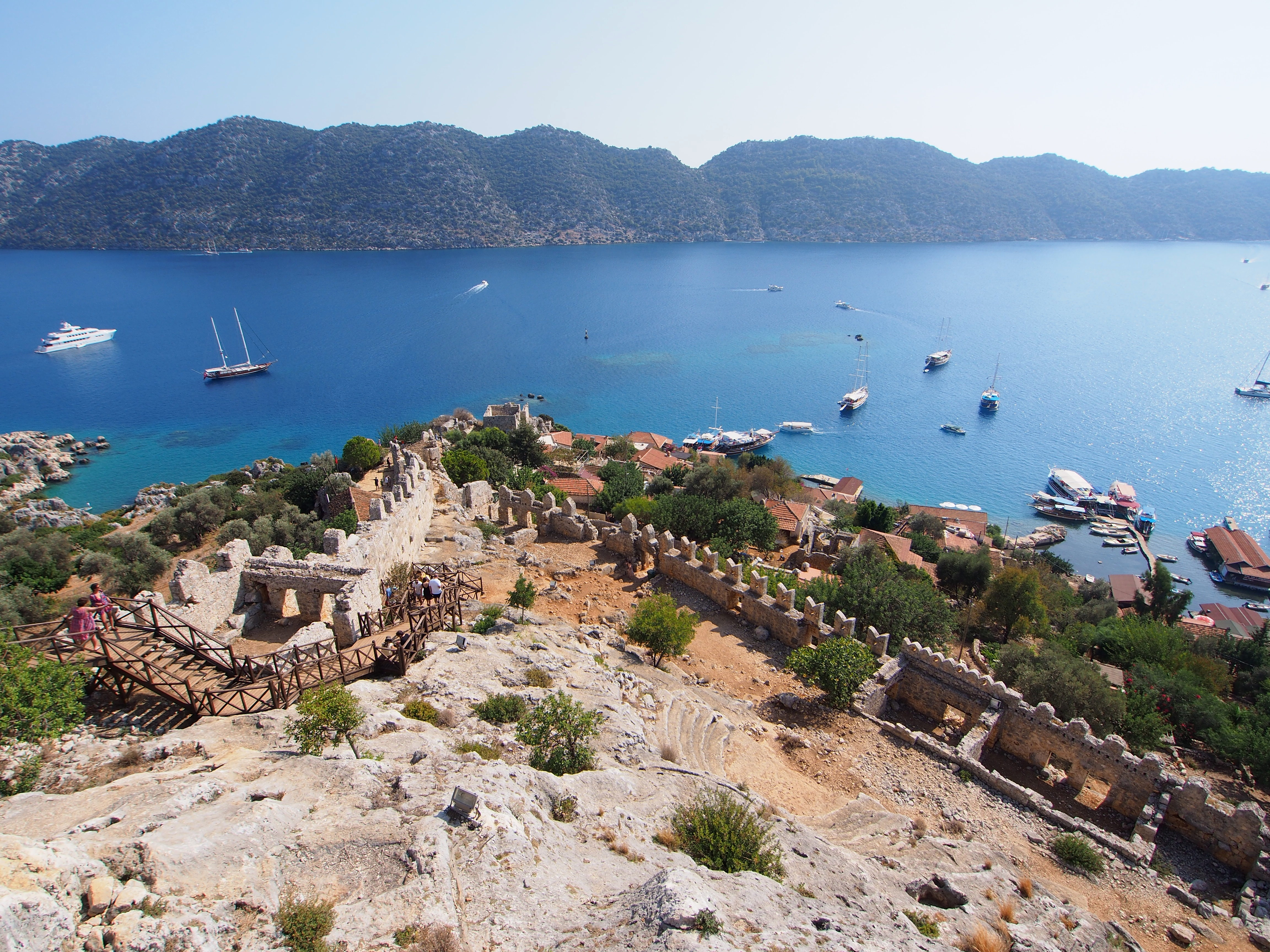
- View from Kaleköy Castle

- Location within Turkey Location within Europe Location within Asia
- Coordinates: 36°11′27″N 29°51′41″E
- Country: Turkey
- Region: Mediterranean, Demre
- Province: Antalya Province

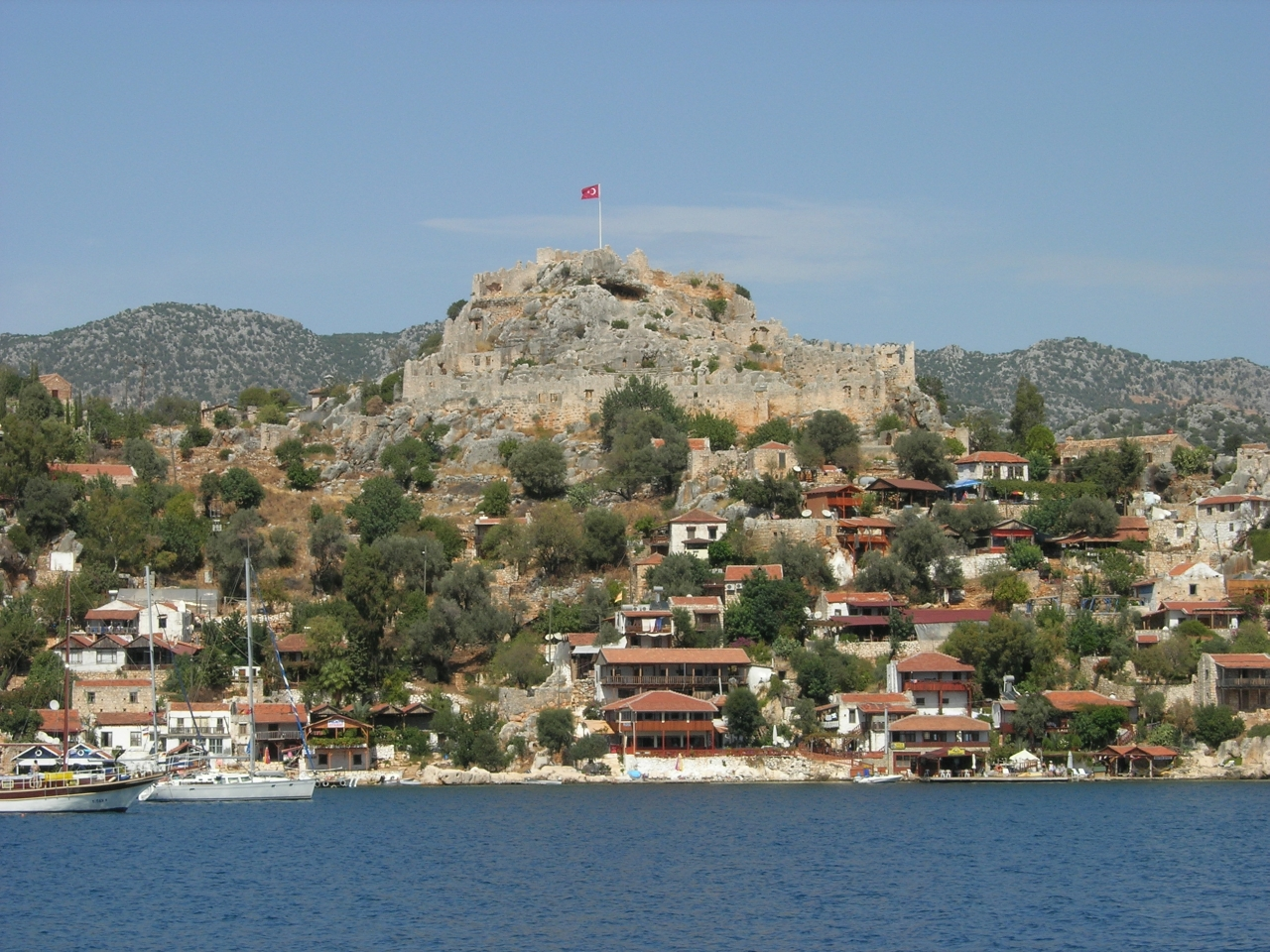
The village of Kaleköy seen from south, with the Byzantine castle in the centre

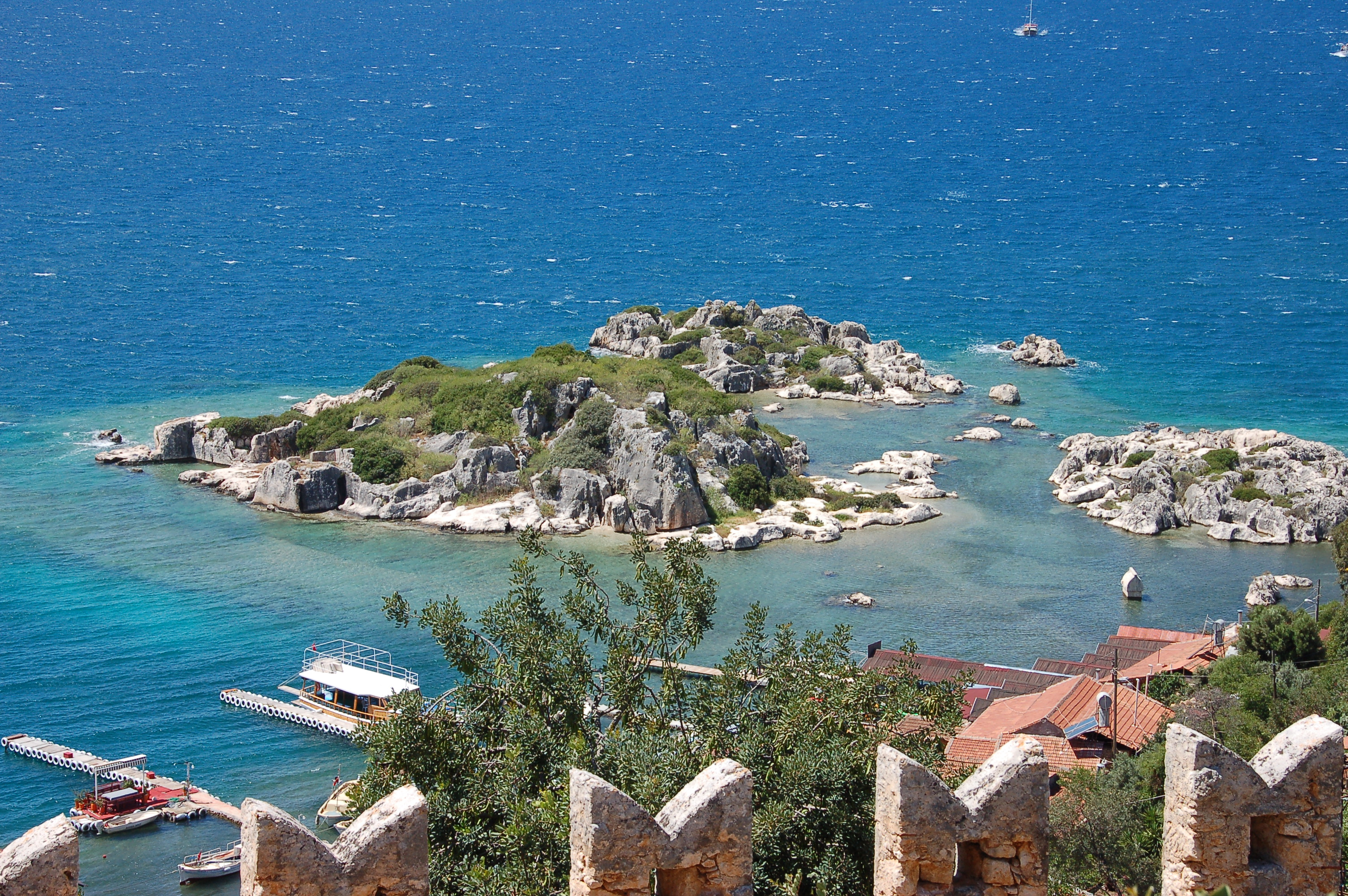
Sunken City Simena

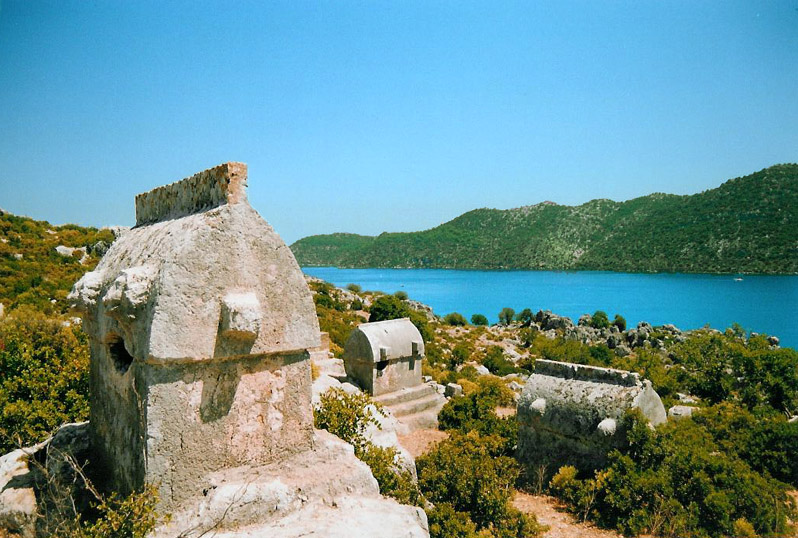
Ancient Lycian tombs

Kaleköy (literally "Castle's village" in Turkish) is a village of the Demre district in the Antalya Province of Turkey, located between Kaş and Demre, on the Mediterranean coast. Kaleköy faces the island of Kekova, and can be reached by sea or on foot from Üçağız.

The village lies amidst a Lycian necropolis, which is partially sunken underwater. Kaleköy is overlooked by a East Roman castle, built in the Middle Ages to fight the pirates who nested in Kekova. The castle contains a small theatre.

Kaleköy is a popular yachting destination.

== See also ==
- Lycia
- Turkish Riviera
