= Teimiussa =

Ancient Lycian port town

Coordinates: 36°11′50″N 29°51′01″E

Teimiussa, also spelt Teimioussa or Timiussa (Ancient Greek: Τειμιούσα), also known as Tristomon (Ancient Greek: Τρίστομον), was a port town of ancient Lycia, near the ancient settlement Tyberissus. The name is not attested in history, but is derived from epigraphic and other evidence. This combination of harbor and inland location is the focus of archaeological exploration. Among the finds are ancient tombs.

Its site is located near the modern town of Üçağız, Asiatic Turkey.

== Literature ==
- Martin Zimmermann: Hafen und Hinterland. Wege der Akkulturation an der lykischen Küste. Vorbericht über die Feldforschungen in den zentrallykischen Orten Tyberissos und Timiussa in den Jahren 1999–2001. In: Mitteilungen des Deutschen Archäologischen Instituts, Abteilung Istanbul. Volume 53, 2003, pp. 265–312. (in German)
