= Nykvåg/Nykan Nature Reserve =

Protected area in Nordland

- Nykvåg/Nykan naturreservat
- IUCN category Ia (strict nature reserve)
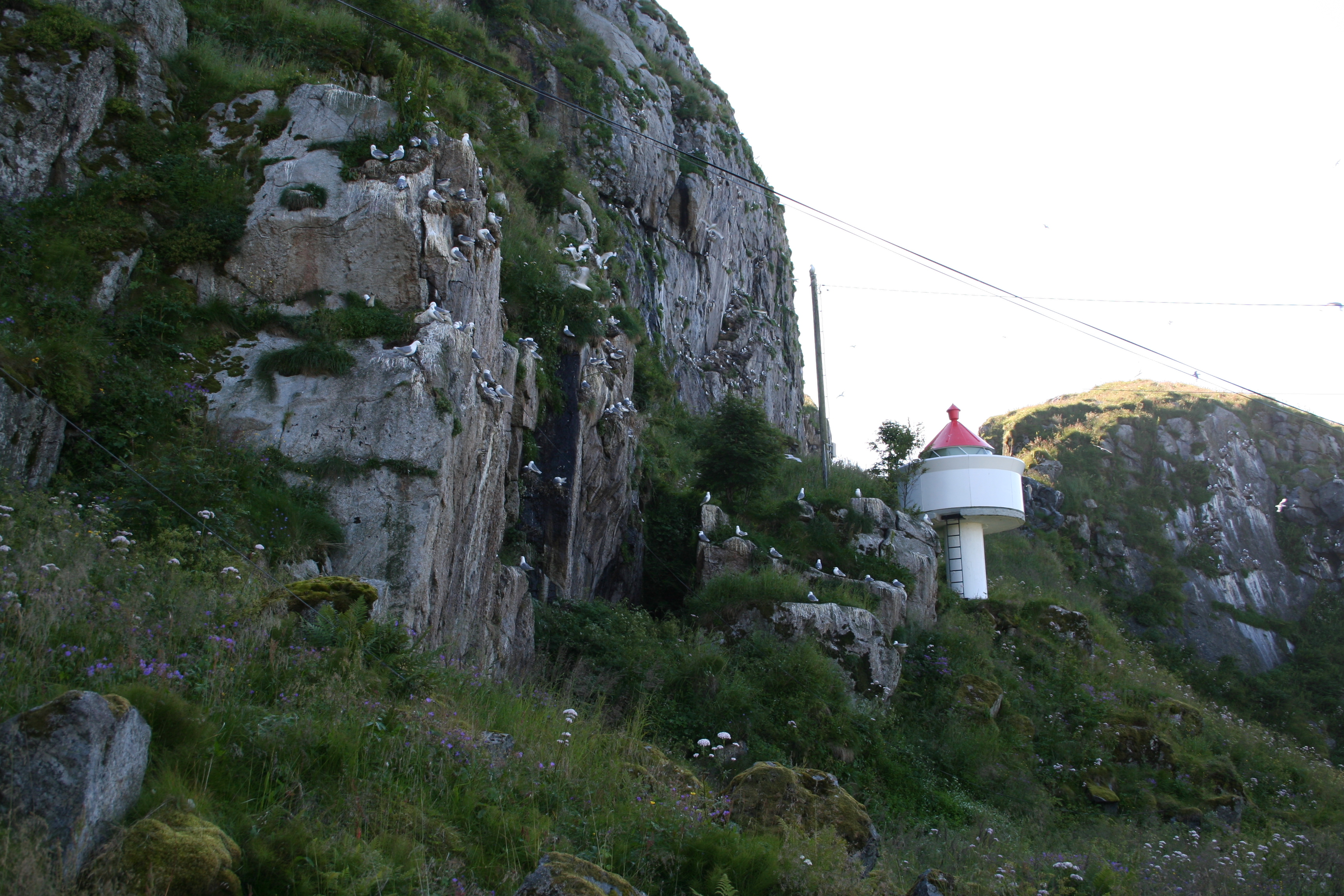
- A bird cliff in the reserve
- Interactive map of Nykvåg/Nykan Nature Reserve
- Location: Vesterålen, Norway
- Nearest city: Nykvåg
- Coordinates: 68°46′8.2″N 14°26′45.8″E
- Area: 355.9 ha (879 acres)
- Established: 2002

The Nykvåg/Nykan Nature Reserve (Norwegian: Nykvåg/Nykan naturreservat) is located in Bø Municipality in Nordland county, Norway.

The nature reserve lies between the villages of Sandvika and Nykvåg, south of the Nyke/Tussen and Frugga nature reserves. It covers an area of 355.9 hectares (879 acres), of which 261.8 hectares (647 acres) is sea. The land area includes the west side of the island of Langøya and three larger islands (Fuglenyken, Måsnyken, and Spjøten) as well as several smaller islands. The area is protected to safeguard many important breeding sites for seabirds. The nature reserve was established on December 6, 2002. Norwegian County Road 916 passes by a bird cliff on the northeast edge of the reserve. It has been designated an Important Bird Area (IBA) by BirdLife International (BLI) because it supports breeding populations of great cormorants, Atlantic puffins and razorbills.
