= Dolichiste =

Coordinates: 36°11′N 29°53′E

Doliche or Dolichiste (Ancient Greek: Δολίχη or Δολιχίστη; Eth. Δολιχεύς or Δολιχίστης) was an island noted by ancient geographers in the Mediterranean Sea off the Lycian coast, in Asia Minor, now called Kekova (or Kakava (Κακαβάς) in Modern Greek), which is located in present-day Antalya Province, Turkey.

Stephanus of Byzantium (s. v.) describes Doliche as an island close to the Lycian coast, on the authority of Callimachus; and he adds that Alexander, in his Periplus of Lycia, calls it Dolichiste. It is mentioned by Pliny (v. 31) and Ptolemy (v. 3). Pliny places it opposite to Chimaera (geography); and both Pliny and Ptolemy name it Dolichiste. Doliche or Dolichiste, is a long island, as the name implies. It lies near the southern coast of Lycia, west of the ruins of Myra, and in front of the spacious bay now named Kekova. The island is a narrow ridge of rock, incapable of yielding a constant supply of water; each house had therefore a tank hollowed in the rock, and lined with stucco. William Martin Leake speaks of the ruins of a large city, with a noble theatre, in a fine harbour formed by a range of rocky islands. But this theatre appears, from what Leake says, to be on the coast of the mainland; and Beaufort observes that the whole of these islands and bays may be included under the general Greek name Kakava. By the 1850s, the island was uninhabited.

== See also ==
- List of Lycian place names
