= Aquapelago =

Assemblage of marine and terrestrial elements, referring to socially constructed spaces

An aquapelago is an assemblage of marine and terrestrial elements in which the aquatic spaces are key to community livelihoods and to communities’ senses of identity and belonging. Aquapelago refers to the socially constructed spaces of island, coastal, lacustrine or riverine locations, where humans have developed particularly concentrated engagements with the marine environment for their livelihoods (such as fishing or gathering aquatic plants) or leisure (such as surfing or diving). A neologism, aquapelago denotes the manner in which environmental psychology has been key to various maritime communities and causes in recent years. For example, the famous Mabo decision on indigenous Australian native title in 1992, successfully argued that areas of the seabed, and the aquatic resources above them, were part of traditional Torres Strait Islander community territories and related senses of communal homelands.

== Concept and etymology ==
The term aquapelago was introduced in 2012 in the Shima online journal of research into island and maritime cultures. The term subsequently gained momentum in geography, anthropology, and cultural studies, since it addresses a conceptual and lexical gap in topical discourse on the human relationship to nature. More recently, the concept has extended in reach to creative fields such as theatre, science fiction, and music.

In its initial coinage, etymologically, the term replaces the initial two syllables of the well-known term archipelago with aqua in order to reassert the role of marine elements in aggregations of islands that has been largely lost from contemporary usage of archipelago. The concept has been further elaborated, linking it to livelihood activities and to the Japanese concept of shima (referring to islands and related distinct cultural landscapes). This concept is striking in that it conceives of combined terrestrial and aquatic spaces as, effectively, neighborhoods.

The concept of aquapelago has been envisaged as a reflection on the Anthropocene and as:

a response to a number of moral-political questions concerning how humans inhabit - and are causing and catalysing changes to - the wider environments of the planet, its oceans, its climate and biomass. Aquapelagic spaces are one type of site in which these changes occur. As sea-levels rise, ocean warming, shifting currents and changes in the biomass and biodiversity occur; those humans implicated into aquapelagic spaces are interacting with a diverse range of actants … In this sense, my proposition of the aquapelago as a concept and focus is intended to facilitate comprehension of Anthropocene impacts on interrelated aquatic and land environments and of the impact on and responses of nonhuman actants.

Subsequent developments of the concept have analysed its applicability to topics such as ocean spaces and national rights of access to these, cultural practices in Melanesian coastal societies and career making in island communities. The original analyses of the aquapelago have been further expanded by addressing metropolitan locales and providing a characterisation of Manhattan as an aquapelagic city that was subsequently critiqued and modified. While there have been critics of the concept, some who regard the term as unnecessary in that archipelagic analyses can be extended to address aquatic elements, writers from various disciplines have engaged with the concept in a positive manner, such as an exploration of the concept with regard to water ecology themed performance works in the journal Women’s Studies Quarterly and a discussion of a geopolitical aesthetic of the subterranean in the journal Geopolitics. Further, the lens of the aquapelago can act as a bridge between the fields of island studies and studies examining seasteading.

== Associated concepts ==
One significant development of the concept of the aquapelago has concerned the notion of there being an “aquapelagic imaginary).” This concept has been subsequently elaborated in a theme issue of the journal Shima on mermaids, mer-cultures and the aquapelagic imaginary to refer to the manner in which communities’ “engagements with their aquapelagic locales” in folk-/media-loric contexts can be understood to reflect upon and transcend “perceptions of the limits of human presence in and experience of aquatic spaces.” In an article analysing the creation of a modern mythic entity, the Ningen, a creature rumoured to inhabit the southern Pacific Ocean, there is a discussion about the aquapelagic imaginary as a “subset" of the "social imaginary”, which can be regarded as a historically determined “enabling but not fully explicable symbolic matrix within which a people imagine and act as world-making collective agents”.

A related notion is that of terraquée space. In a 2018 study of the Azores based on Raul Brandão's travel memoir As Ilhas Desconhecidas (1926) and Vitorino Nemésio's novel Mau Tempo no Canal (1944), architect Celina Vale drew on geographer Louis Marrou's use of the term to describe how land (terra) and water (aquée) "intersect in a more-than-geographical manner". Citing Hayward's aquapelago and Epeli Hau'ofa's characterisation of Oceania as a "sea of islands", she argued that in the archipelago land and sea "come together to form a unique state and single body" while remaining distinguishable: they "communicate with one another through hierarchies and subordination", with the sea acting as "the great projection plane of all the elements from which the island territory is constructed". Vale combined this with co-visibility, a notion of seeing and being seen taken from Georges Didi-Huberman, which she traced across three relations (sea/land, outside/inside and island/island) in elements such as headlands, bays, bell towers and windows that act as visual landmarks and mediators. Hayward later cited her work on the "mistiness" of the Azores and the "bodily apprehension-immersion" of the islands in a study of fog on the Grand Banks, and as one of the few explorations of the intersection of aquapelagos with the aerial domain, through "the obscured visibility of islands caused by humidity, haze, mists and clouds".
