= Nykvåg =

Village in Bø Municipality, Norway

- Village
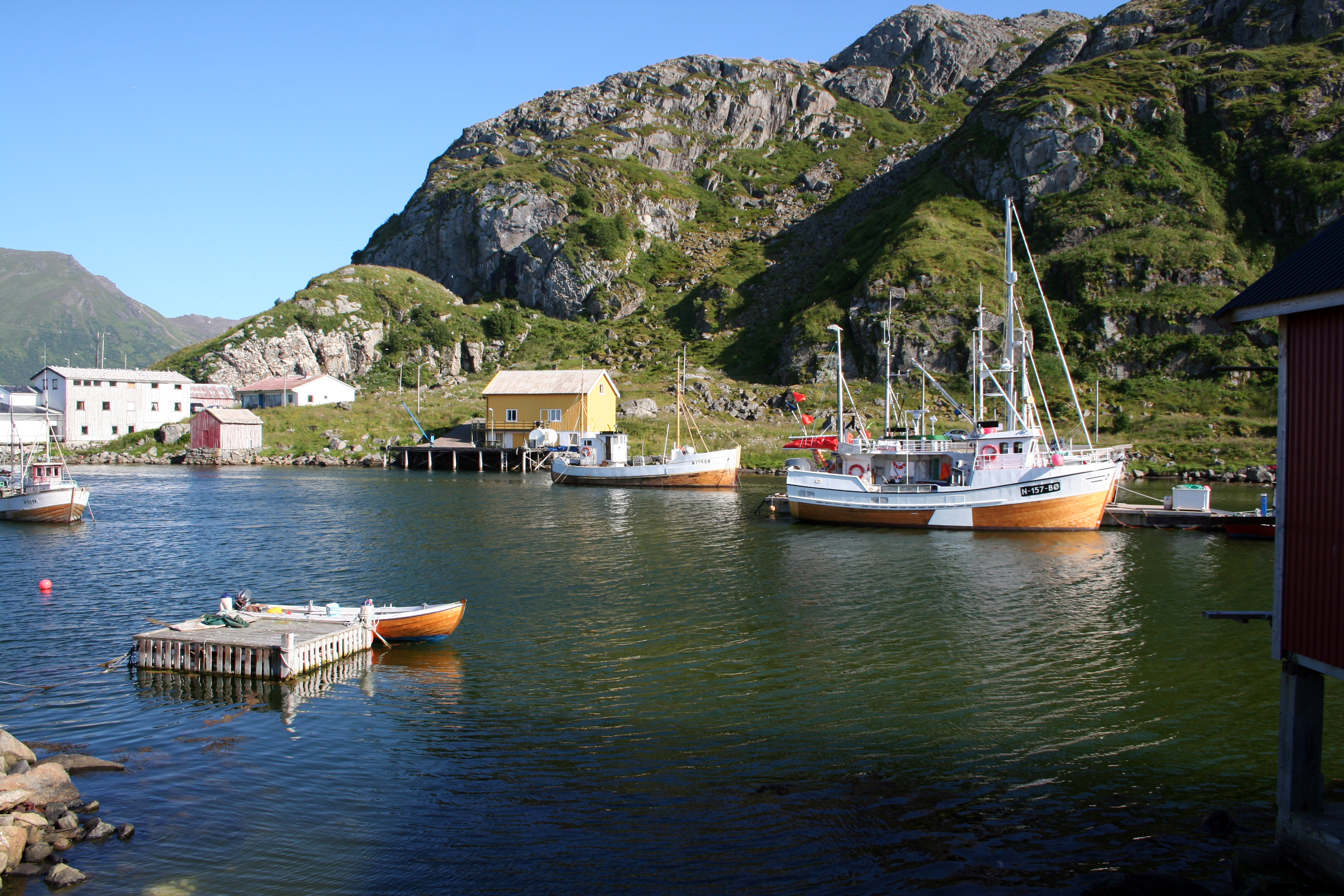
- The port in Nykvåg, July 2006
- Interactive map of Nykvåg
- Location within Nordland Location within Norway
- Coordinates: 68.7768°N 14.4729°E
- Country: Norway
- Region: Northern Norway
- County: Nordland
- District: Vesterålen
- Municipality: Bø Municipality
- Elevation: 6 m (20 ft)
- Time zone: UTC+01:00 (CET)
  - Summer (DST): UTC+02:00 (CEST)
- Post Code: 8475 Straumsjøen

Nykvåg is a fishing village in Bø Municipality in Nordland county, Norway. It is one of the largest fishing villages on the west coast of the large island of Langøya in the Vesterålen archipelago. The village lies along the south side of Nykvåg bay and the neighboring village to the west is Vågen. The villages of Hovden and Malnes are located about 5 kilometres (3.1 mi) northeast of Nykvåg. Nykvåg is also known for its rich bird life in the Nykvåg/Nykan Nature Reserve adjacent to the village.
