= Archipelago =

Collection of islands

The Indonesian Archipelago, located in Asia and Oceania, is the largest archipelagic state in the world.

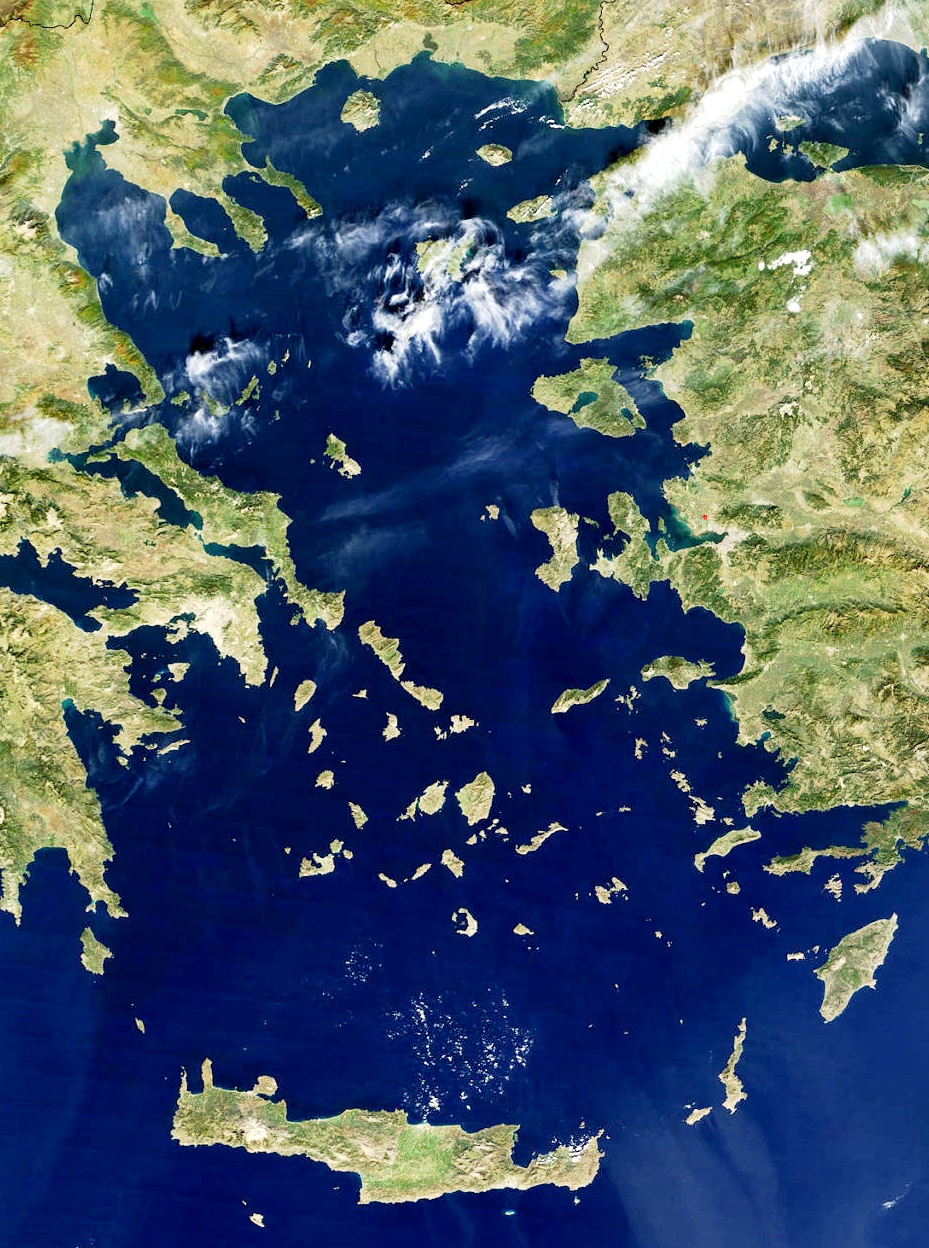
The Aegean Sea with its large number of islands is the origin of the term archipelago.

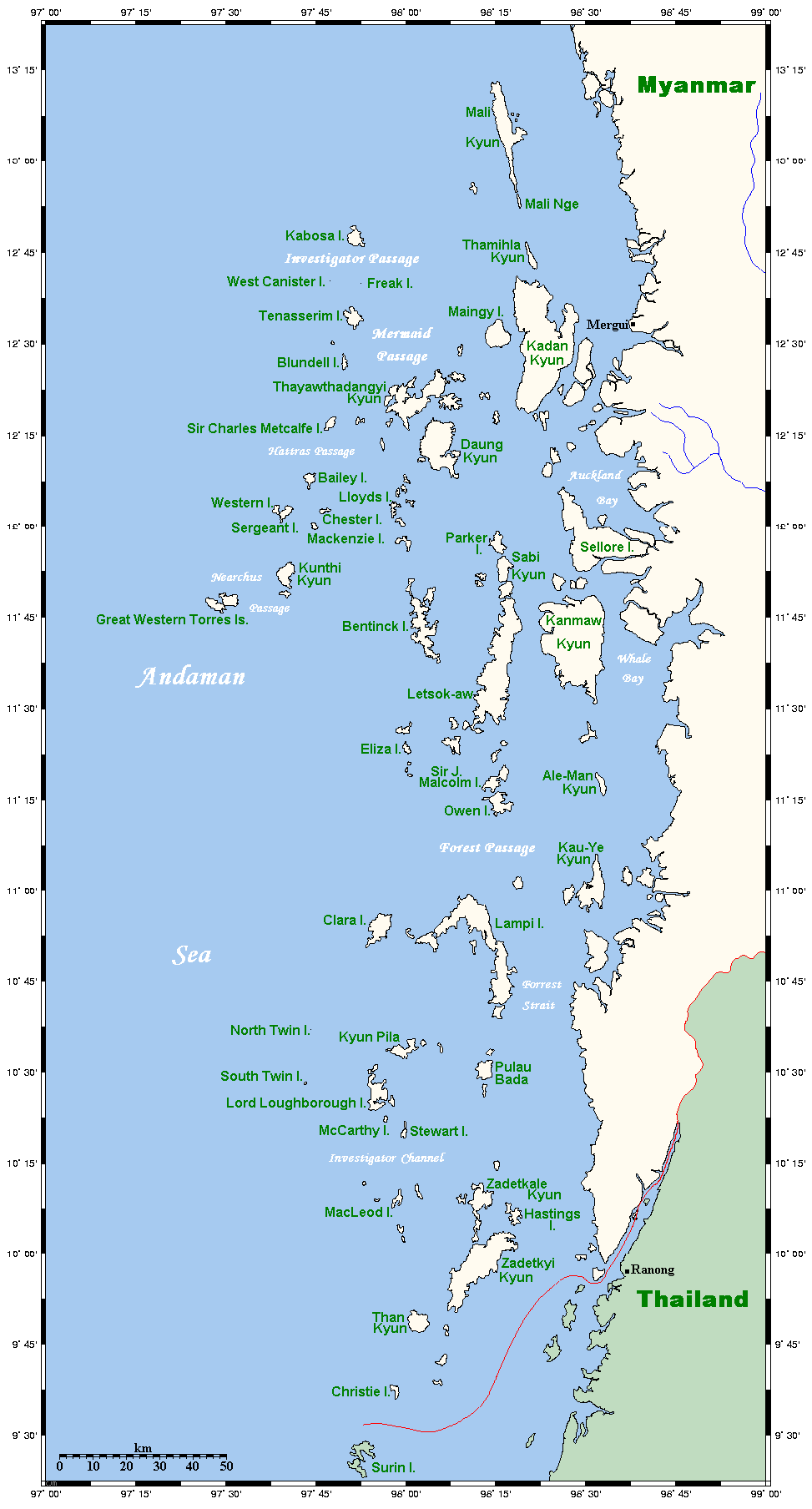
The Mergui Archipelago in Myanmar

An archipelago (/ˌɑːrkəˈpɛləɡoʊ/ AR-kə-PEL-ə-goh), sometimes called an island group or island chain, is a chain, cluster, or collection of islands. An archipelago may be in an ocean, a sea, or a smaller body of water. The largest archipelago country in the world is Indonesia, whose territory comprises most of the Indonesian Archipelago. Examples of archipelagos include the Aegean Islands (the origin of the term archipelago), the Canadian Arctic Archipelago, the Stockholm Archipelago, the Lucayan (Bahamian) Archipelago, the Japanese archipelago, the Hawaiian Archipelago, and the Galapagos.

== Etymology ==
The word archipelago is derived from the Italian arcipelago (used as a proper name for the Aegean Sea), itself perhaps a deformation of the Greek Αιγαίον Πέλαγος. Usage later shifted to refer to the Aegean Islands (since the sea has a large number of islands). The erudite paretymology, deriving the word from Ancient Greek ἄρχι- (arkhi-, "chief") and πέλαγος (pélagos, "sea"), proposed by Buondelmonti, can still be found.

== Geographic types ==
Archipelagos may be found isolated in large bodies of water or neighboring a large land mass. For example, Scotland has more than 700 islands surrounding its mainland, which form an archipelago.

Depending on their geological origin, islands forming archipelagos can be referred to as oceanic islands, continental fragments, or continental islands.

=== Oceanic islands ===
These are landmasses that are typically formed due to volcanic activity. Oceanic islands rise from the seafloor and do not have any underlying continental rock.

The Hawaiian Islands and Galapagos Islands in the Pacific, and Mascarene Islands in the south Indian Ocean are examples.

Some oceanic islands can emerge above sea level and form volcanic islands. The Azores archipelago of Portugal, located in the North Atlantic Ocean, known for its lush volcanic landscapes and hot springs, is an example.

=== Continental fragments ===
Continental fragments are islands that were once part of a continent, and became separated due to natural processes. For example, the fragments may be formed by moving glaciers which cut out land, which then fills with water. The Farallon Islands off the coast of California are examples of continental fragment islands.

=== Coral cay archipelago ===
A coral cay archipelago is formed when ocean currents transport sediments that gradually build up on coral reefs. The Florida Keys are one example.

=== Continental islands ===
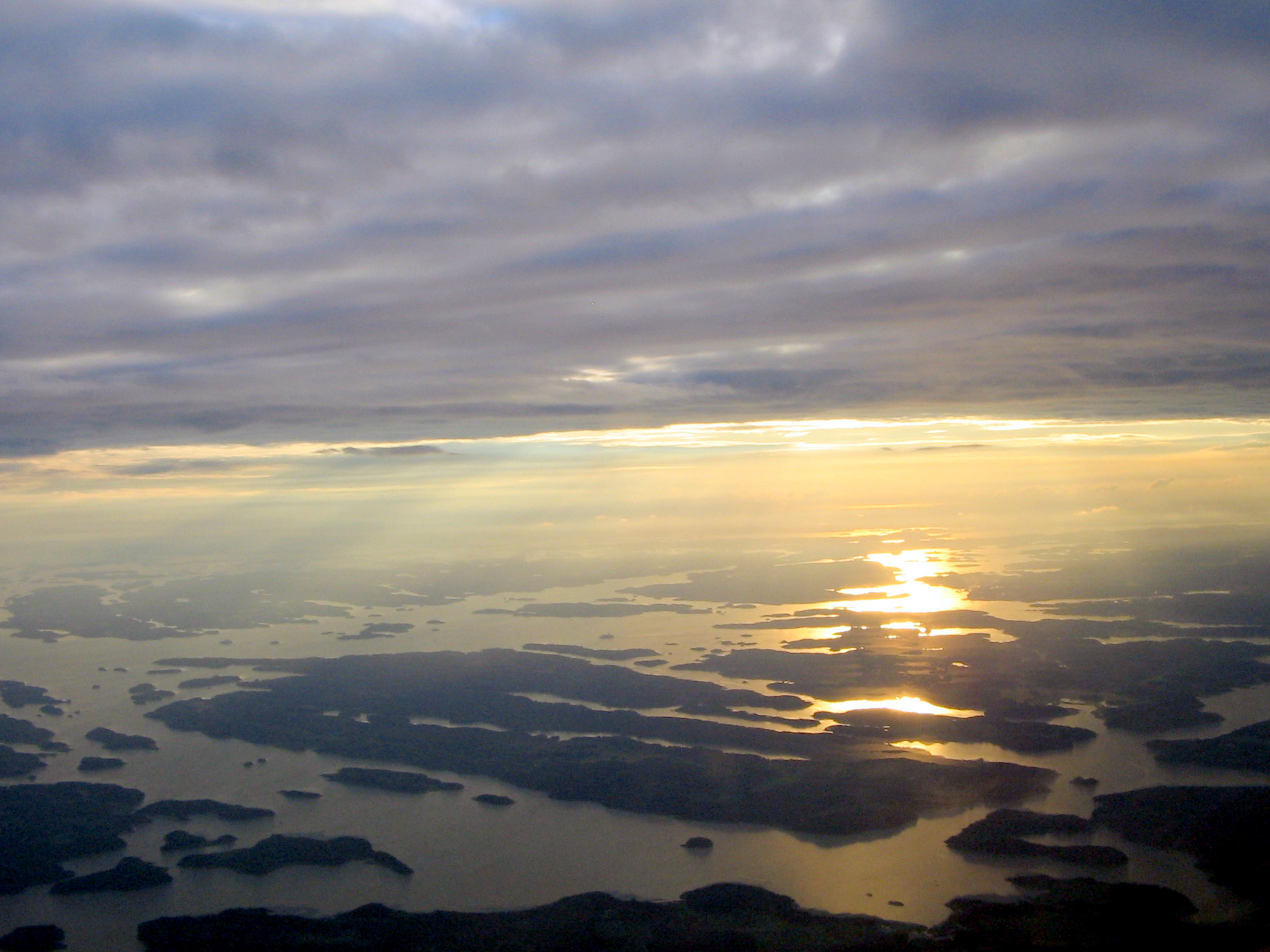
The Archipelago Sea with many islands in southwestern Finland

Continental islands are islands that were once part of a continent and still sit on the continental shelf, which is the edge of a continent that lies under the ocean. The islands of the Inside Passage off the coast of British Columbia and the Canadian Arctic Archipelago are examples.

=== Artificial archipelagos ===
Artificial archipelagos are structures which are built in water bodies for leisure, strategic, or environmental purposes. These are man-made structures, and are constructed using land reclamation techniques, floating platforms, or submerged structures.

Artificial archipelagos have been created in various countries for different purposes. Palm Islands and The World Islands in Dubai were created for leisure and tourism purposes. Marker Wadden in the Netherlands is being built as a conservation area for birds and other wildlife.

== Superlatives ==
The largest archipelago in the world by number of islands is the Archipelago Sea, which is part of Finland. There are approximately 40,000 islands, most being uninhabited. The largest archipelagic state in the world by area with more than 17,500 islands, and by population of around 284 million people, is Indonesia.

== See also ==
- List of landforms
- List of archipelagos by number of islands
- List of archipelagos
- Archipelagic state
- List of islands
- Aquapelago
