= Norwegian County Road 901 =

Road in Nordland county, Norway

County Road 901

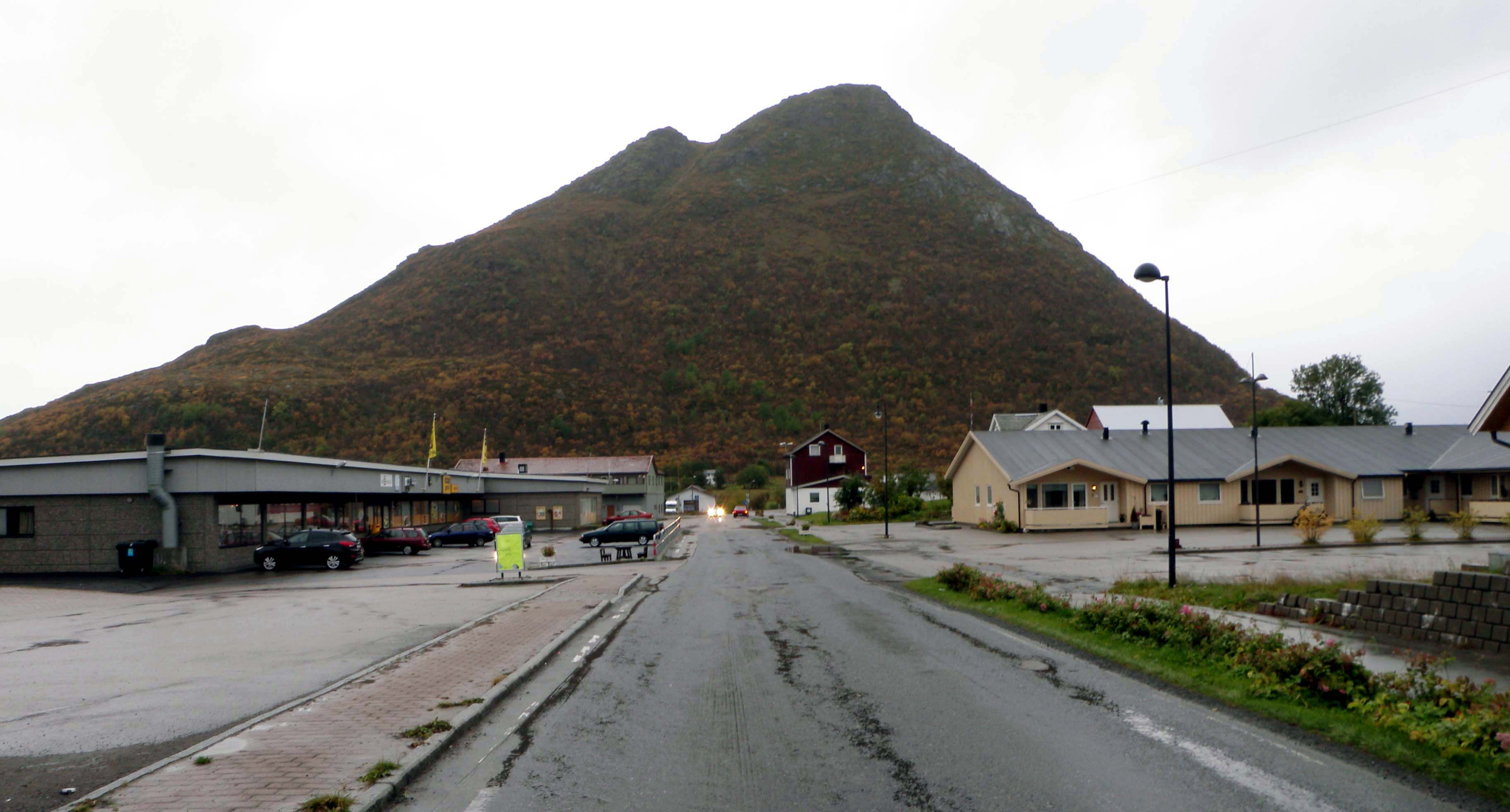
- County Road 901 entering Straume

Route information
- Length: 9.4 km (5.8 mi)

Major junctions
- West end: Fv820 at Straume, Bø
- Fv911 at Veanova, Bø; Fv909 at Pollåsen, Bø
- East end: Fv820 at Straumsnes, Bø

Location
- Country: Norway
- Counties: Nordland

Highway system
- Roads in Norway; National Roads; County Roads

County Road 901 (Norwegian: Fylkesvei 901) is a 9.4-kilometer (5.8 mi) road in Bø Municipality in Nordland county, Norway.

The road branches off from County Road 820 at the village of Straume and runs east until it reaches Veanova. There County Road 911 branches off to the north towards the village of Skålbrekka and County Road 820 turns south. After passing Pollåsen, where County Road 909 branches off towards the village of Auvåg, the road runs close to the shore above various bays of the Eidsfjorden before terminating in the village of Straumsnes, where it rejoins County Road 820.
