= Frøskeland =

Village in Sortland Municipality, Norway

Frøskeland: Frøskeland (Norwegian); Froská (Northern Sami)
- Settlement
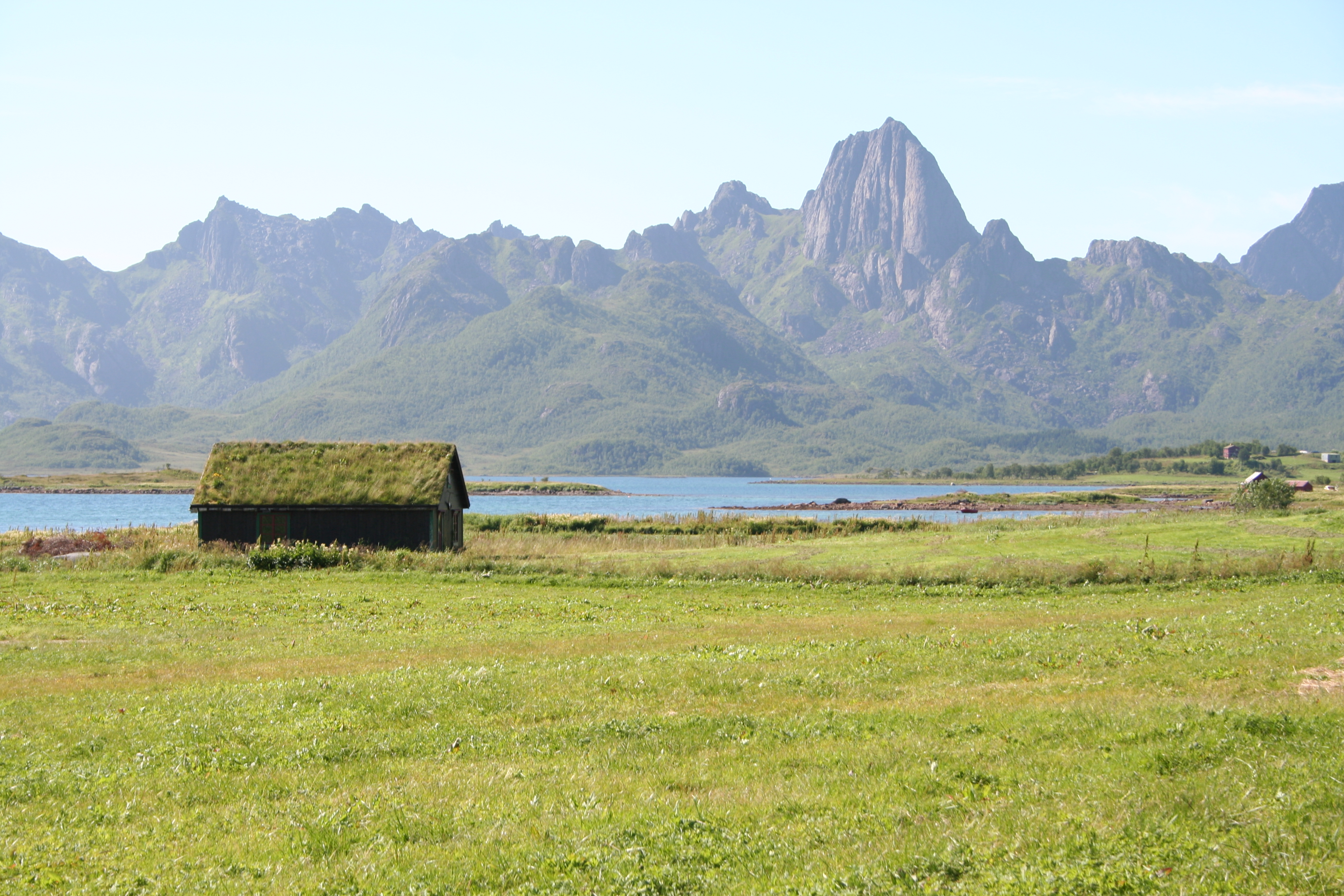
- Frøskeland with Mount Reka in the background
- Interactive map of Frøskeland
- Location within Nordland Location within Norway
- Coordinates: 68.7585°N 15.1155°E
- Country: Norway
- Region: Northern Norway
- County: Nordland
- District: Vesterålen
- Municipality: Sortland Municipality
- Elevation: 9 m (30 ft)
- Time zone: UTC+01:00 (CET)
  - Summer (DST): UTC+02:00 (CEST)
- Post Code: 8400 Sortland

Frøskeland (Norwegian) or Froská (Northern Sami) is a village in Sortland Municipality in Nordland county, Norway.

== Geography ==
Frøskeland lies on the island of Langøya, at the innermost part of Eidsfjorden, on the west side of the Vikeid isthmus. County Road 820 from the town of Sortland to Bø Municipality passes through Frøskeland. County Road 821 to the village of Myre branches off from County Road 820 at Frøskeland and travels north across Frøskelandseid (the Frøskeland Isthmus) to Steinlandsfjord in Øksnes Municipality. Frøskeland is also the junction for County Road 885, which travels south along the east side of the Eidsfjorden to the villages of Holmstad, Sandnes, and the Hadsel Bridge.

== Name ==
The name Frøskeland is believed to derive from the word frøskja, related to the verb fryse which means 'freeze'.

== Industry and services ==
The concrete factory Vesterålsbetong AS (formerly Tingvoll Betong AS and SE Betong AS) is located in Frøskeland. Frøskeland had a post office until June 1, 1997.
