= Straume =

Straume may refer to:

== Places ==
=== Latvia ===
- Straume, Latvia, a village in Jelgava county

=== Norway ===
- Straume, Bergen, a village in Bergen Municipality in Vestland county
- Straume, Nordland, a village in Bø Municipality in Nordland county
- Straume, Vaksdal, a village in Vaksdal Municipality in Vestland county
- Straume, Øygarden, a village in Øygarden Municipality in Vestland county
- Straume Nature Reserve, Norway
- Straume, or Hyen, a village in Gloppen Municipality in Vestland county

== Other ==
- Straume, Latvian name for the Flow (2024 film), a 2024 animated feature directed by Gints Zilbalodis
- Straume (surname)

== See also ==
- Straumen (disambiguation)
