= Norwegian County Road 913 =

Road in Norway

County Road 913
- Guvågveien

Route information
- Length: 12.67 km (7.87 mi)

Major junctions
- North end: Fv820 at Rottåsen, Bø
- South end: Guvåg, Bø

Location
- Country: Norway
- Counties: Nordland

Highway system
- Roads in Norway; National Roads; County Roads

County Road 913 (Norwegian: Fylkesvei 913, also known as Guvågveien / "the Guvåg road") is a 12.67-kilometer (7.87 mi) road in Bø Municipality in Nordland County, Norway. It starts in the village of Rottåsen, where it branches off from County Road 820, and runs southeast to the head of Jørnfjorden and then continues along the east side of the fjord to the village of Guvåg on the shore of Eidsfjorden.

Municipal Road 914 (a.k.a. Jørlandsveien or 'the Jørland road', formerly County Road 914) branches off from the road at Verhalsen and runs 4.12 kilometers (2.56 mi) north, where it joins County Road 820 at Kråkhaugen. Further south, at Røsnes, Municipal Road 924 (a.k.a. Røsnesveien 'the Røsnes road', formerly also designated County Road 914) branches off to the southwest and runs 1.14 kilometers (0.71 mi) to Jektneset on the shore of Jørnfjorden.
