= Norwegian County Road 911 =

County road in Bo, Nordland County, Norway

County Road 911

Route information
- Length: 5.4 km (3.4 mi)

Major junctions
- North end: Fv820 at Skålbrekka, Bø
- Klakksjordveien
- South end: Fv901 at Veanova, Bø

Location
- Country: Norway
- Counties: Nordland

Highway system
- Roads in Norway; National Roads; County Roads

County Road 911 (Norwegian: Fylkesvei 911) is a 5.4-kilometer (3.4 mi) road in Bø Municipality in Nordland County, Norway.

The road branches off from County Road 820 at the village of Skålbrekka and runs south. Klakksjordveien ('Klakksjord Road', formerly known as Veg 210 'Road 210') branches off to the east and connects to the village of Klakksjorda on the northwest shore of Jørnfjorden. The road then joins County Road 901 at Veanova.

The road was paved with gravel until 2014, when it was asphalted.
