= Vikeid =

Isthmus in Nordland, Norway

Vikeid Vikeidet
- Isthmus
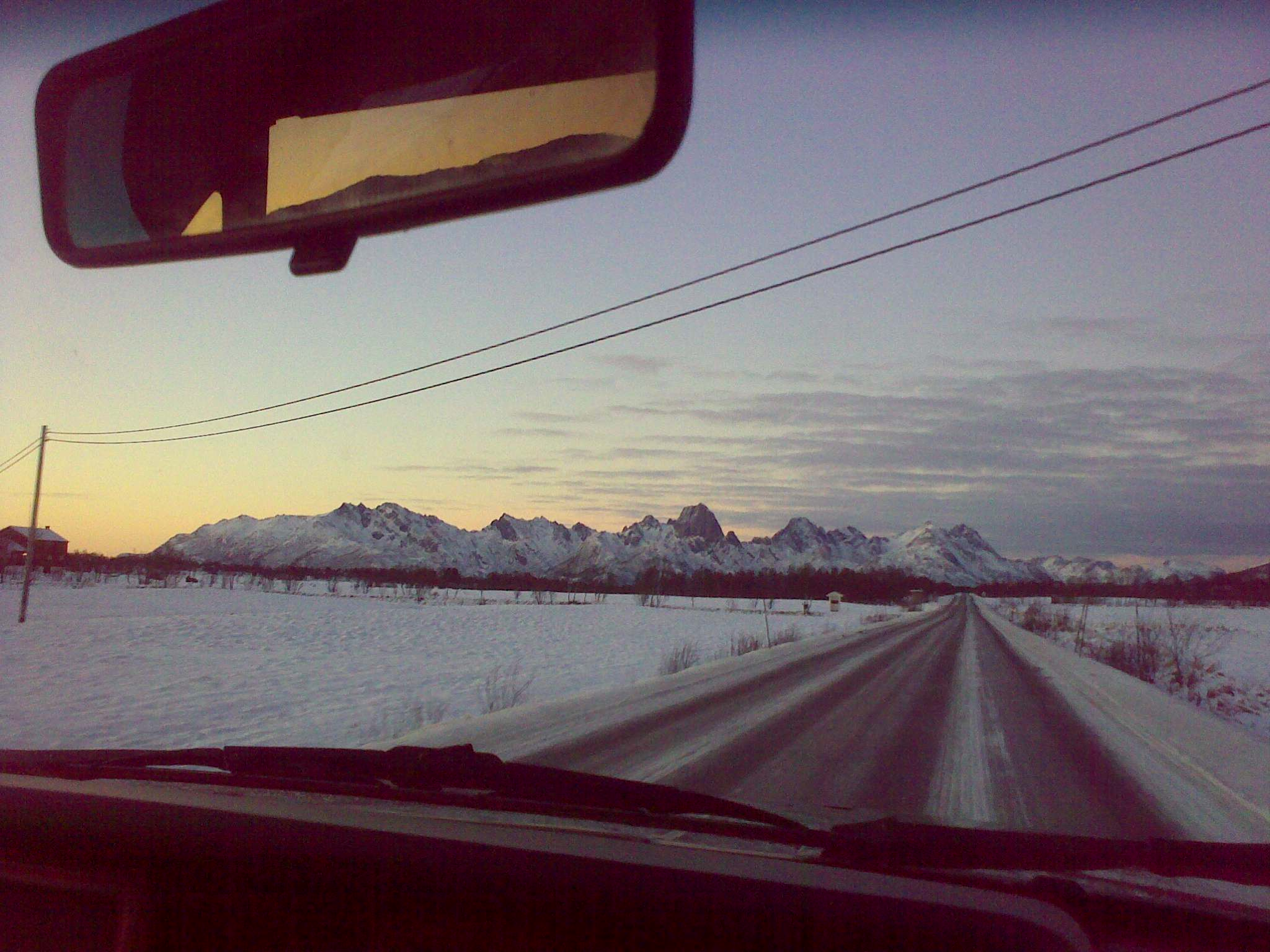
- Driving west across Vikeid
- Interactive map of the peninsula
- Coordinates: 68°45′39″N 15°12′58″E
- Location: Vesterålen, Nordland county, Norway

Dimensions
  - Width: 5 km
- Elevation: 9 m (30 ft)

Vikeid or Vikeidet (lit. 'Vik Isthmus') is a flat isthmus on the island of Langøya in Sortland Municipality in Nordland county, Norway. The village of Vik lies on the east side of the isthmus and the village of Frøskeland lies on the west side. The isthmus has the Eidsfjorden to the west and the Sortlandsundet strait in the east. The isthmus almost divides Langøya in two. To the north lies the northwestern part of Sortland Municipality, and further north is Øksnes Municipality. The southwest part of Sortland Municipality lies south of the isthmus. The Eidsfjorden and the western part of the isthmus belonged to Hadsel Municipality until 1963, when it was transferred to Sortland Municipality.

The isthmus is marshy. Parts of the isthmus are cultivated as grassland, and some areas have been trenched and planted with Norway spruce. In the eastern part of the isthmus is the former Vikeid Agricultural Machine Operators' School. The school was closed in the summer of 2005. There are several lakes in the eastern part of the isthmus, toward Frøskeland.

County Road 820 from Sortland to Bø Municipality crosses Vikeid from east to west. Most of the route crosses the isthmus in a straight line, and the road is therefore known as one of the routes in Vesterålen with a lot of speeding.

In 2004, the Vesterålen radio-controlled vehicle club held the northern Norwegian model aircraft championship at the premises of the Vikeid Agricultural Machine Operators' School.

Since the end of the 1990s, the pink-footed goose has grazed in parts of Vikeid during the spring migration period. Previously the geese grazed more on grassy fields and marshes along the Sortland Sound, but the geese have been increasingly been driven from these pastures and have begun to find new pastures at a greater distance from the sound.
