= Norwegian County Road 909 =

Road in Nordland, Norway

County Road 909

Route information
- Length: 3.4 km (2.1 mi)

Major junctions
- West end: Fv901 at Pollåsen, Bø
- East end: Auvåg, Bø

Location
- Country: Norway
- Counties: Nordland

Highway system
- Roads in Norway; National Roads; County Roads

County Road 909 (Norwegian: Fylkesvei 909) is a 3.4-kilometer (2.1 mi) road in Bø Municipality in Nordland County, Norway.

The road branches off from County Road 901 at Pollåsen and runs east until it terminates in reaches the village of Auvåg on the western shore of Jørnfjord. Along the way, the local roads to Ringstadåsan and Ringstad branch off to the north and south, respectively, at Ringstadkrysset (the Ringstad junction). East of the junction the road is also named Pollveien (Poll Road), and to the west it is also named Auvågveien (Auvåg Road).
