= Vikosen Nature Reserve =

Nature reserve in Nordland, Norway

- Vikosen naturreservat
- IUCN category Ia (strict nature reserve)
- Interactive map of Vikosen Nature Reserve
- Nearest city: Vik
- Coordinates: 68°45′19.9″N 15°17′9.9″E
- Area: 93 ha (230 acres)
- Established: 2000

The Vikosen Nature Reserve (Norwegian: Vikosen naturreservat) is located in Sortland Municipality in Nordland county, Norway.

The nature reserve includes a shallow water area in the inlet Vikosen and a 10-meter (33 ft) wide zone of shoreline above it. The reserve has an area of 92.7 hectares (229 acres), of which 5.5 hectares (14 acres) is land and 87.5 hectares (216 acres) is sea. The area is protected in order to safeguard an important wetland area with natural flora and fauna, especially for its function as a nationally significant area used by the pink-footed goose during migration. It offers the geese a much-needed gathering and resting point during their strenuous spring migration.

County Road 956 passes through the village of Vik along the northwest shore of the reserve, and County Road 820 to Sortland runs along the southwest shore.
