= Guvåg =

Village in Bø Municipality, Norway

- Village
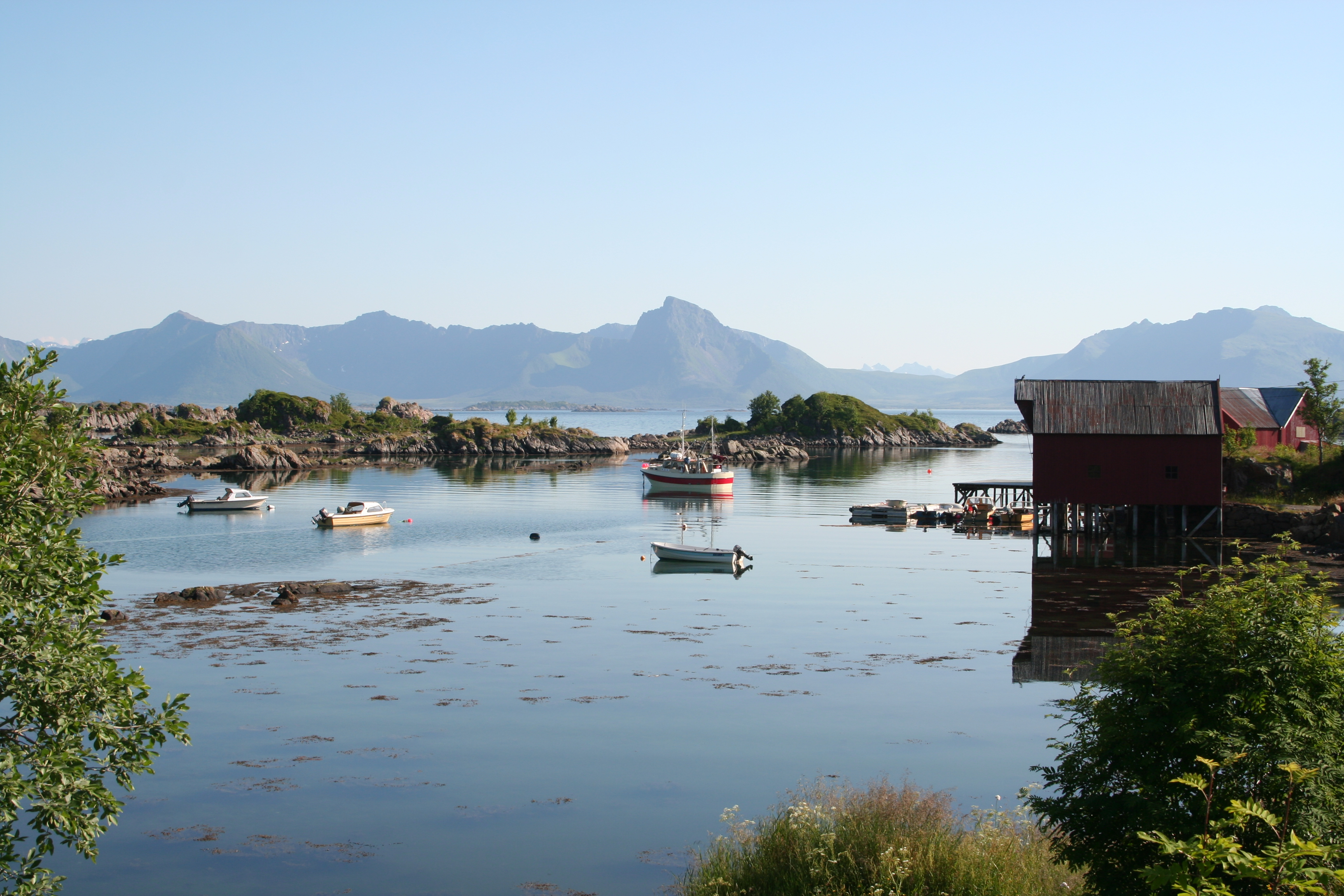
- Interactive map of Guvåg
- Location within Nordland Location within Norway
- Coordinates: 68.6643°N 14.7585°E
- Country: Norway
- Region: Northern Norway
- County: Nordland
- District: Vesterålen
- Municipality: Bø Municipality
- Elevation: 6 m (20 ft)
- Time zone: UTC+01:00 (CET)
  - Summer (DST): UTC+02:00 (CEST)
- Post Code: 8475 Straumsjøen

Guvåg is a village in Bø Municipality in Nordland county, Norway. The village is located on the shore of Eidsfjord between the mouth of Jørnfjorden to the east and Hellfjorden to the west. Many skerries lie in the sea near Guvåg. Ørntuva Hill (247 meters or 810 feet) rises immediately north of Guvåg, with the Breitinden Plateau (598 meters or 1,962 feet) rising beyond that.

Norwegian County Road 913, which terminates in Guvåg, runs north from the village, connecting it to other settlements on the island of Langøya.
