= Ryggedal Tunnel =

Road tunnel in Vesterålen, Norway

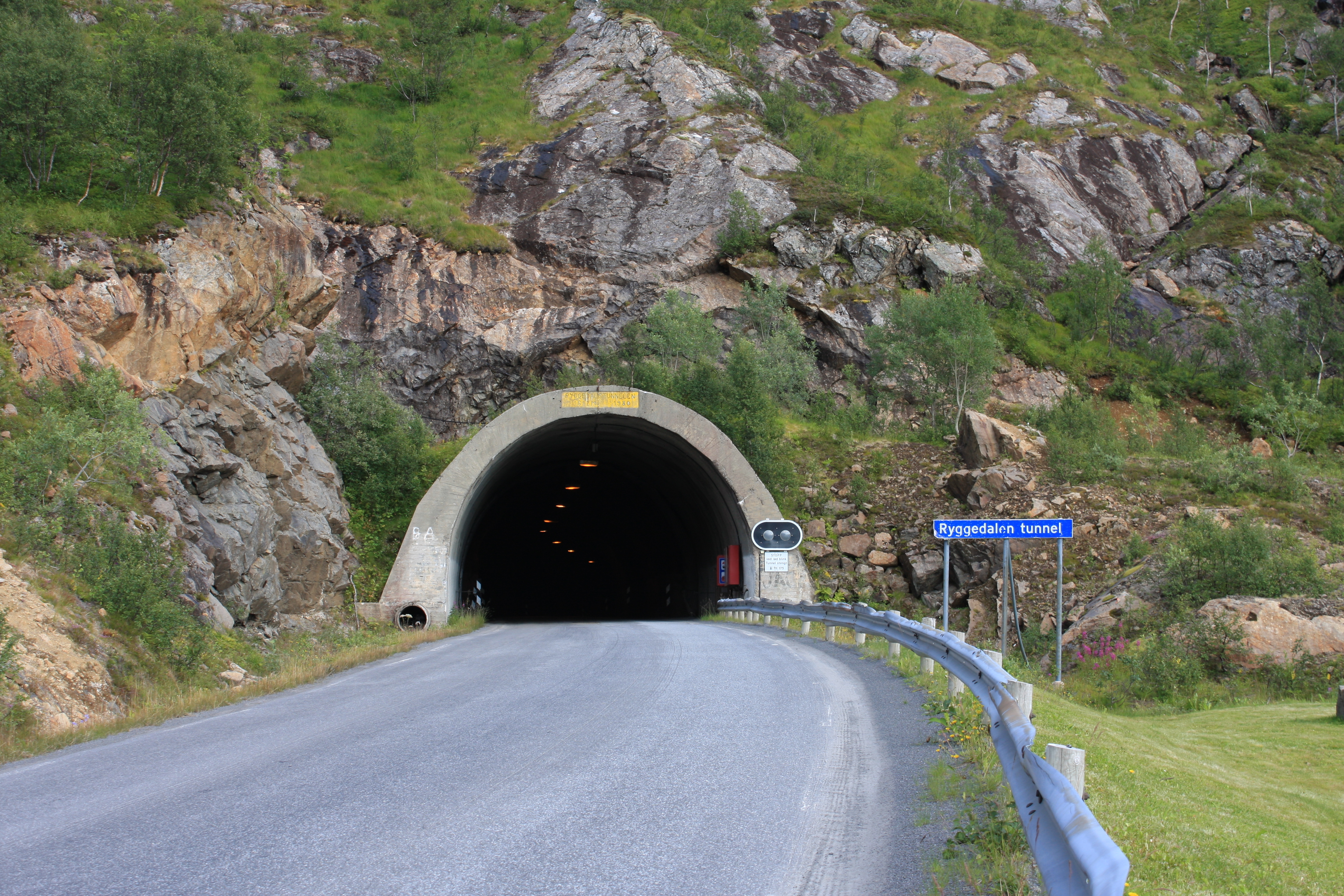
- Northwest entrance of the Ryggedal Tunnel
- Interactive map of Ryggedal Tunnel

Overview
- Location: Nordland, Norway
- Coordinates: 68°44′40.2″N 14°50′57.2″E
- Route: Fv820
- Start: Teistpollskaret
- End: Skandalsskaret

Operation
- Opened: 1980
- Operator: Statens vegvesen
- Traffic: Automotive

Technical
- Length: 1,612 meters (5,289 ft)
- No. of lanes: 2
- Tunnel clearance: 4.1 meters (13 ft)

The Ryggedal Tunnel (Norwegian: Ryggedalstunnelen, also known as the Bø Tunnel, Norwegian: Bøtunnelen) is a road tunnel that is part of Norwegian County Road 820 on the border of Bø Municipality and Øksnes Municipality in Nordland county, Norway. The tunnel is 1,612 meters (5,289 ft) long.

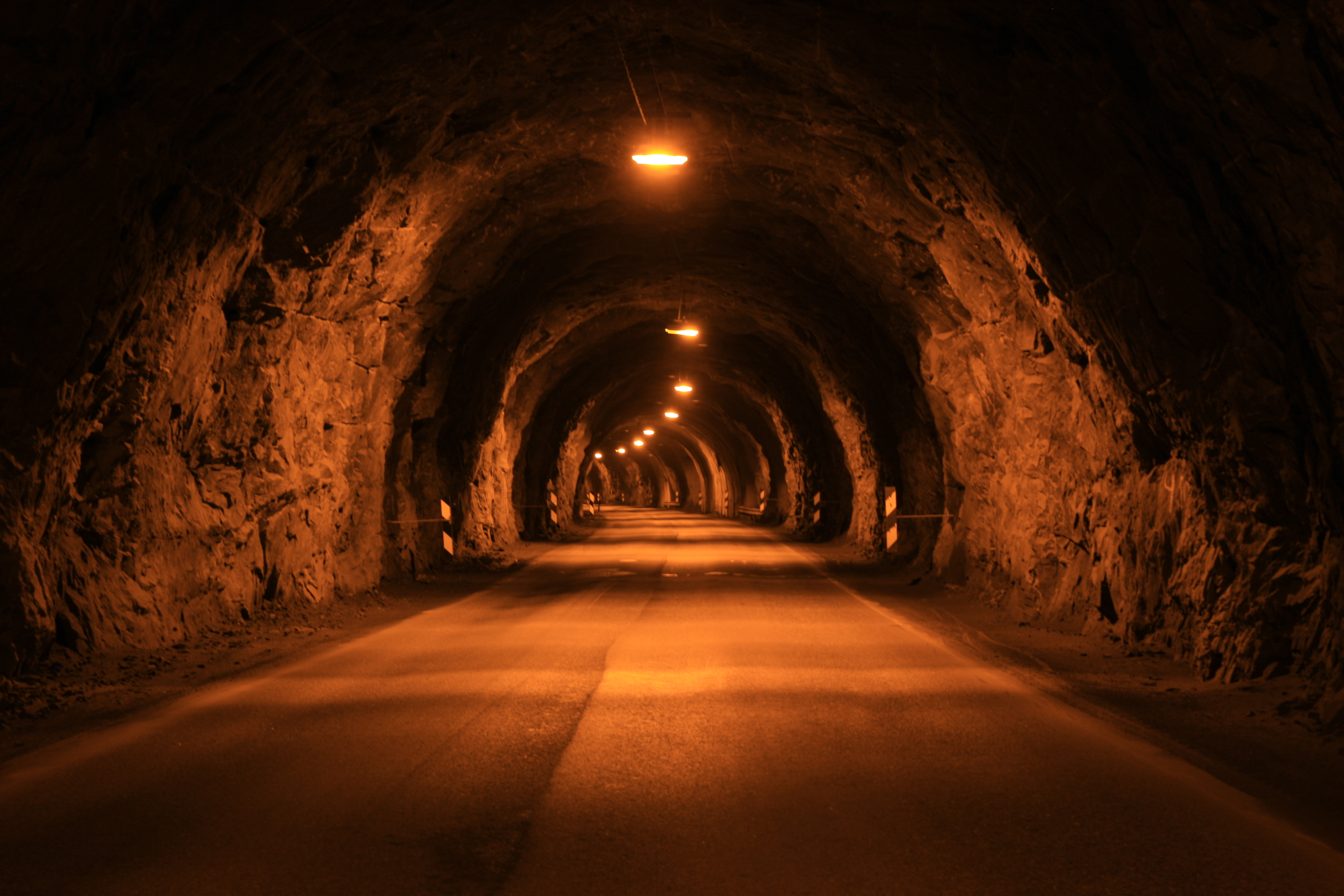
Inside the tunnel, looking northwest

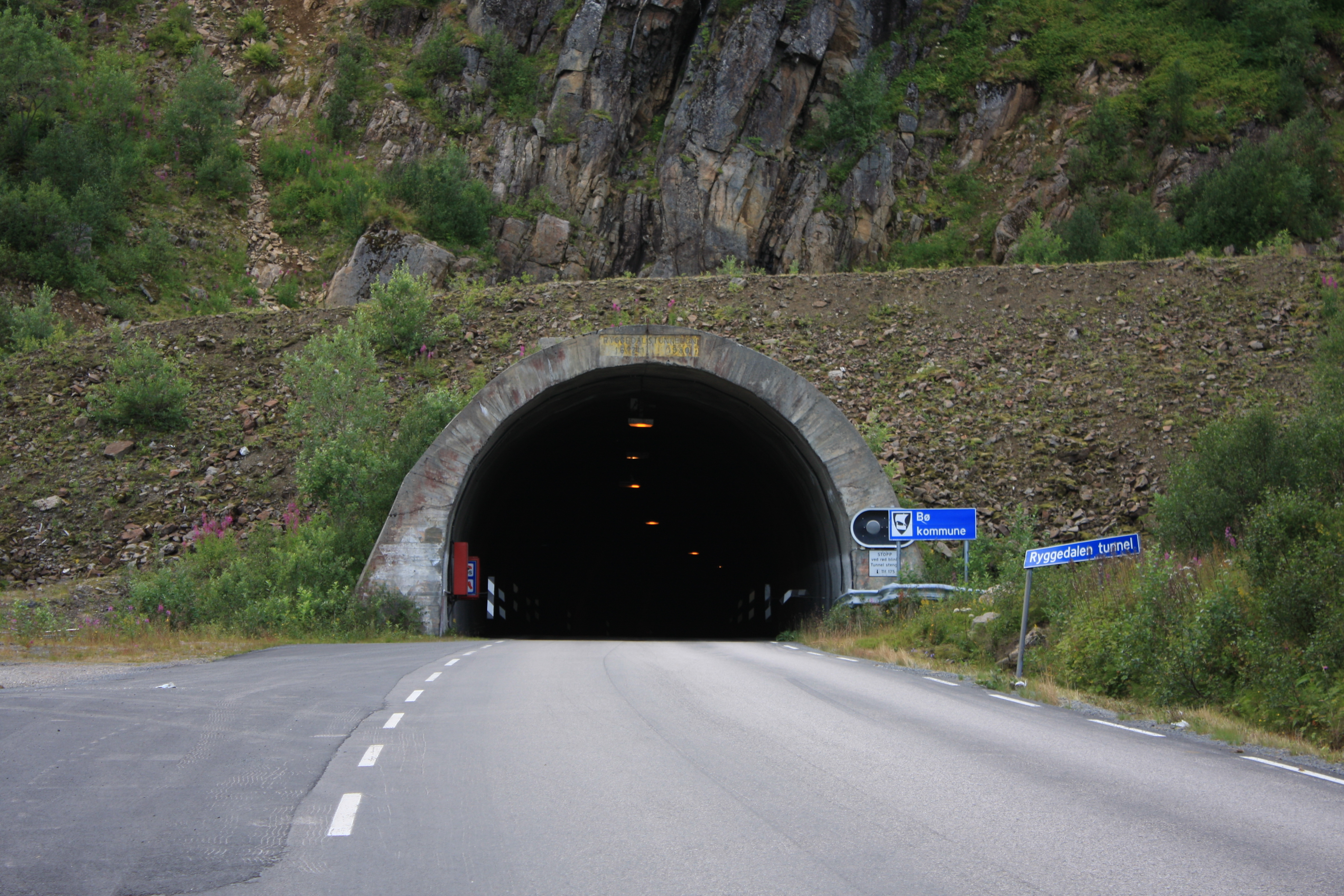
Southeast entrance to the tunnel

Ryggedal Tunnel

Work on the tunnel was begun in 1977 under the leadership of the engineer Edward Pegg, and the tunnel was opened on October 17, 1980. Built at a cost of 35.5 million kr, this was the most expensive tunnel project in Norway until that time and also the most difficult. One-sixth of the tunnel has molded concrete vaulting.

Prior to the construction of the tunnel, Bø Municipality did not have any road connections to the rest of Norway. Residents of Bø used a ferry crossing between Kråkberget in Bø Municipality and Sandset in Øksnes Municipality. Upon completion of the tunnel, the ferry crossing was closed.

Like many other tunnels in Norway, the Ryggedal Tunnel has condensation problems. Condensation can lead to dangerous situations because the pavement suddenly becomes damp when entering the tunnel. The tunnel's infrastructure was upgraded in 2015.
