= Straumen =

Straumen may refer to:

== Places ==
=== Norway ===
- Straumen, Finnmark, a village in Båtsfjord municipality, Finnmark county
- Straumen, Ibestad, a village in Ibestad municipality, Troms county
- Straumen, Kvæfjord, a village in Kvæfjord municipality, Troms county
- Straumen, Lyngen, a village in Lyngen municipality, Troms county
- Straumen, Nordland, a village in Sørfold municipality, Nordland county
- Straumen, Sørreisa, a village in Sørreisa municipality, Troms county
  - Straumen Chapel, a parish church in Sørreisa municipality, Troms county
- Straumen, Trøndelag, a village in Inderøy municipality, Trøndelag county

== See also ==
- Strømmen
- Straume (disambiguation)
