= Litløy Lighthouse =

Coastal lighthouse in Norway

Litløy Lighthouse Litløy fyrstasjon
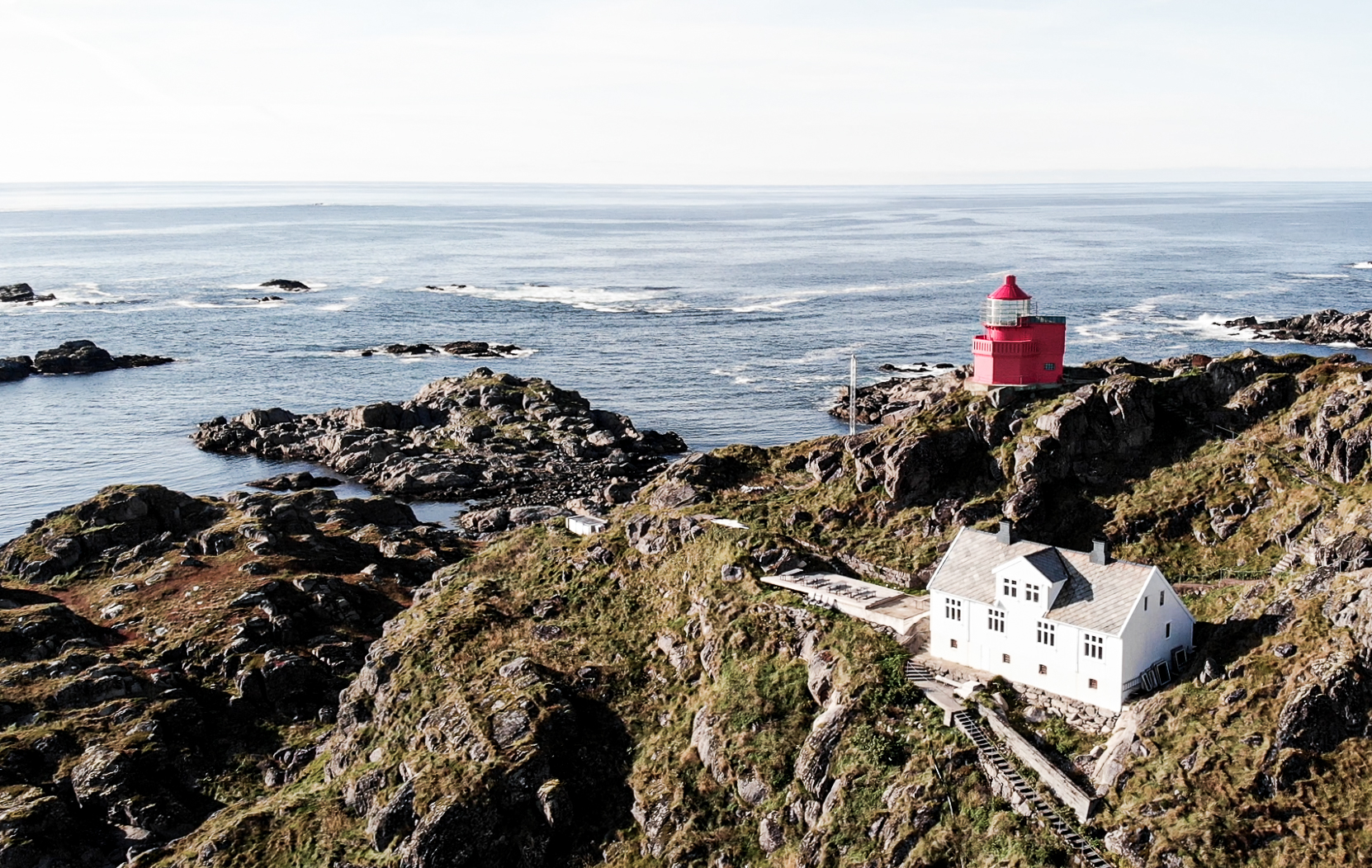
- View of the lighthouse
- Location: Litløya, Bø Municipality, Norway
- Coordinates: 68°35′36″N 14°18′31″E

Tower
- Constructed: 1912
- Construction: stone (tower)
- Automated: 1991
- Height: 9 m (30 ft)
- Shape: octagon
- Markings: White (tower), red (lantern)

Light
- Deactivated: 2009
- Focal height: 55 m (180 ft), 48.7 m (160 ft)
- Range: 12.1 nmi (22.4 km; 13.9 mi)
- Characteristic: Fl W 10s
- Norway no.: 800010

Litløy Lighthouse (Norwegian: Litløy fyr) is a coastal lighthouse in Bø Municipality in Nordland county, Norway. It is located on the island of Litløya in the Vesterålen archipelago, which overlooks the nearby Lofoten islands.

== History ==
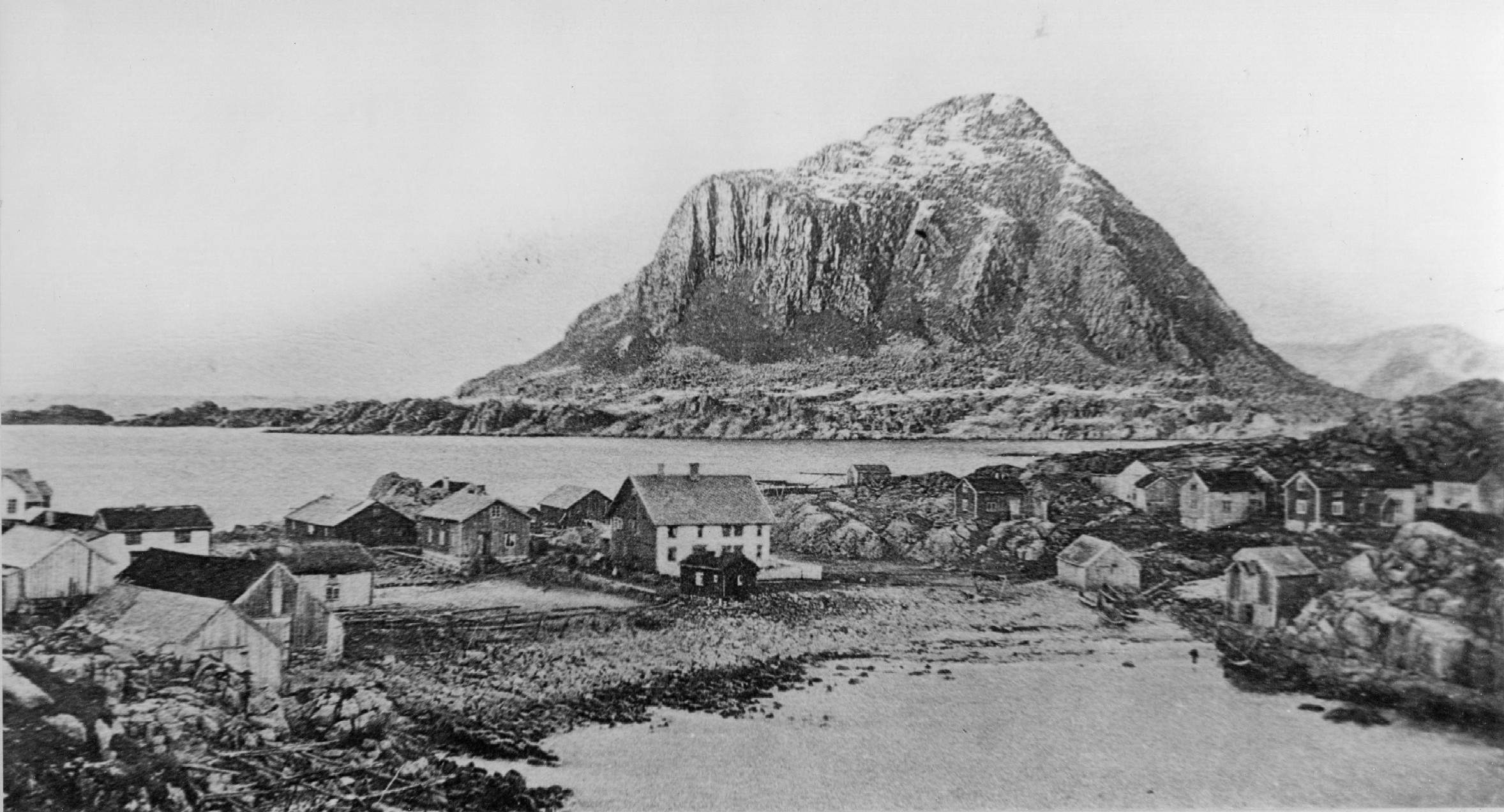
Littleisland (Litløya) village, now abandoned

The lighthouse and the adjoining buildings were built in 1912, and the light itself was electrified in 1959. In 1991, the light was automated. The people who worked at Littleisland Lighthouse remained, however, first and foremost to do maintenance at the lighthouse and nearby beacons. Secondly, there was a need to keep shipping activity under observation, both to control and assist if need be. There was also a meteorological weather station on the island. Eventually the cost of keeping the staff at the island caused the lighthouse to be depopulated on 26 June 2003.

== Private ownership ==
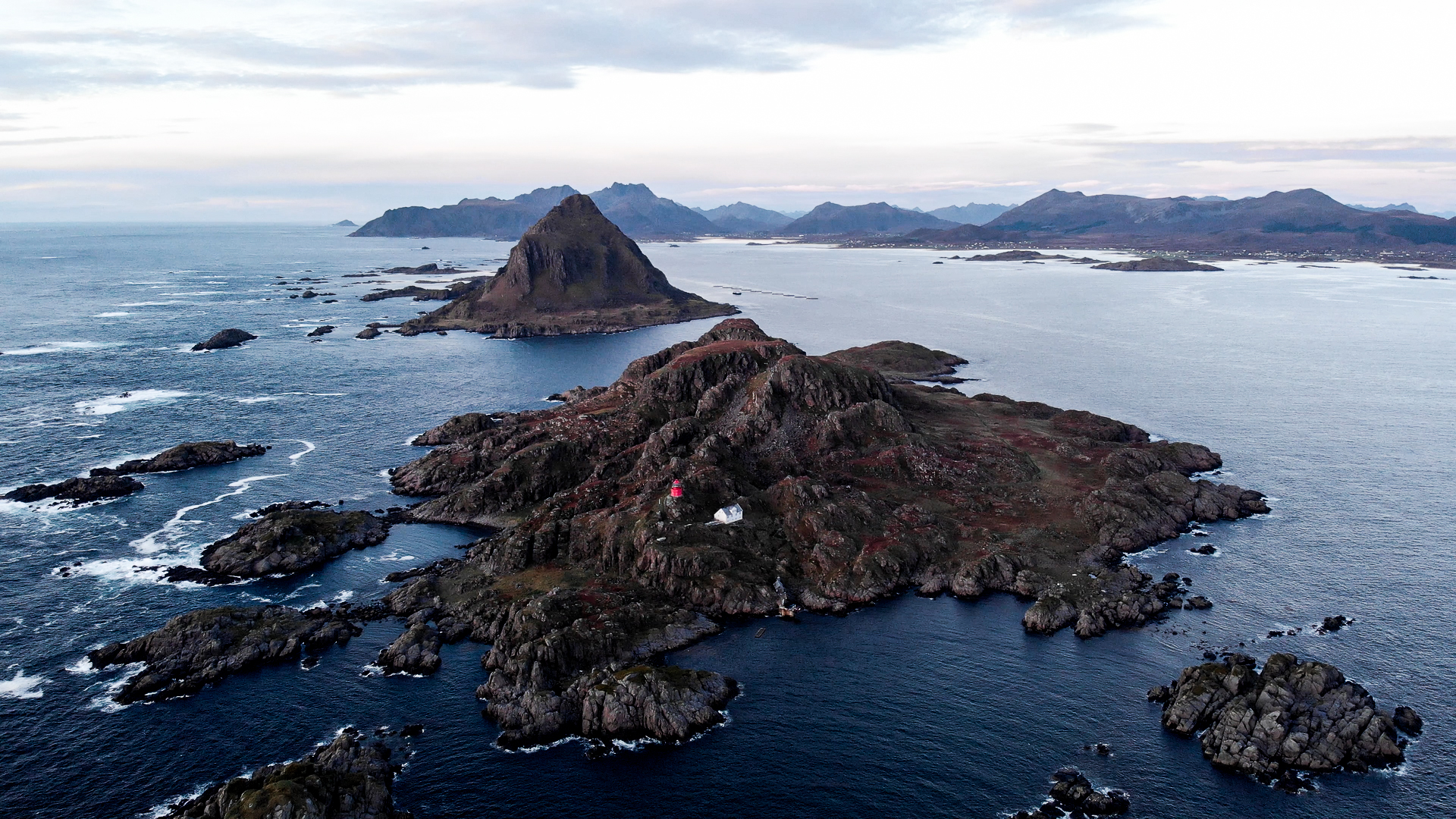
Littleisland from above – Litloya

In 2005–06, the Norwegian Coastal Administration (NCA) sold 20 lighthouses along the coast of Norway. One of these was Litløy Lighthouse. Bø Municipality was offered to buy the lighthouse, but chose not to accept the offer. It was then sold to Ellen Marie Hansteensen. She bought the lighthouse in order to make it accessible to the public, in accordance to Norwegian law (Stortingsmelding 28 (2000–2001)).

Since 2006, Hansteensen has renovated much of the property to offer accommodation and daytime visitors an opportunity to explore the island. Stein Halvorsen is the project's architect. There are also guided tours of the facility, on request. The project at Litløy Lighthouse has been documented by the Norwegian Broadcasting Corporation (Norge rundt, autumn of 2006, ’Der ingen skulle tru at nokon kunne bu’, autumn of 2011)

The lighthouse owner is the island's only remaining permanent inhabitant, though various support staff are often present to help with renovations and daily tasks.

NCA removed the diesel driven lighthouse beacon in November 2009. It was replaced by a light running on solar power, batteries and has a double LED 350 lightbulb. The new signal is one white blink, every 10 seconds. The light is visible for 12 nautical miles (22 km). The old light was visible for 20 nautical miles (37 km).

== Restoration ==
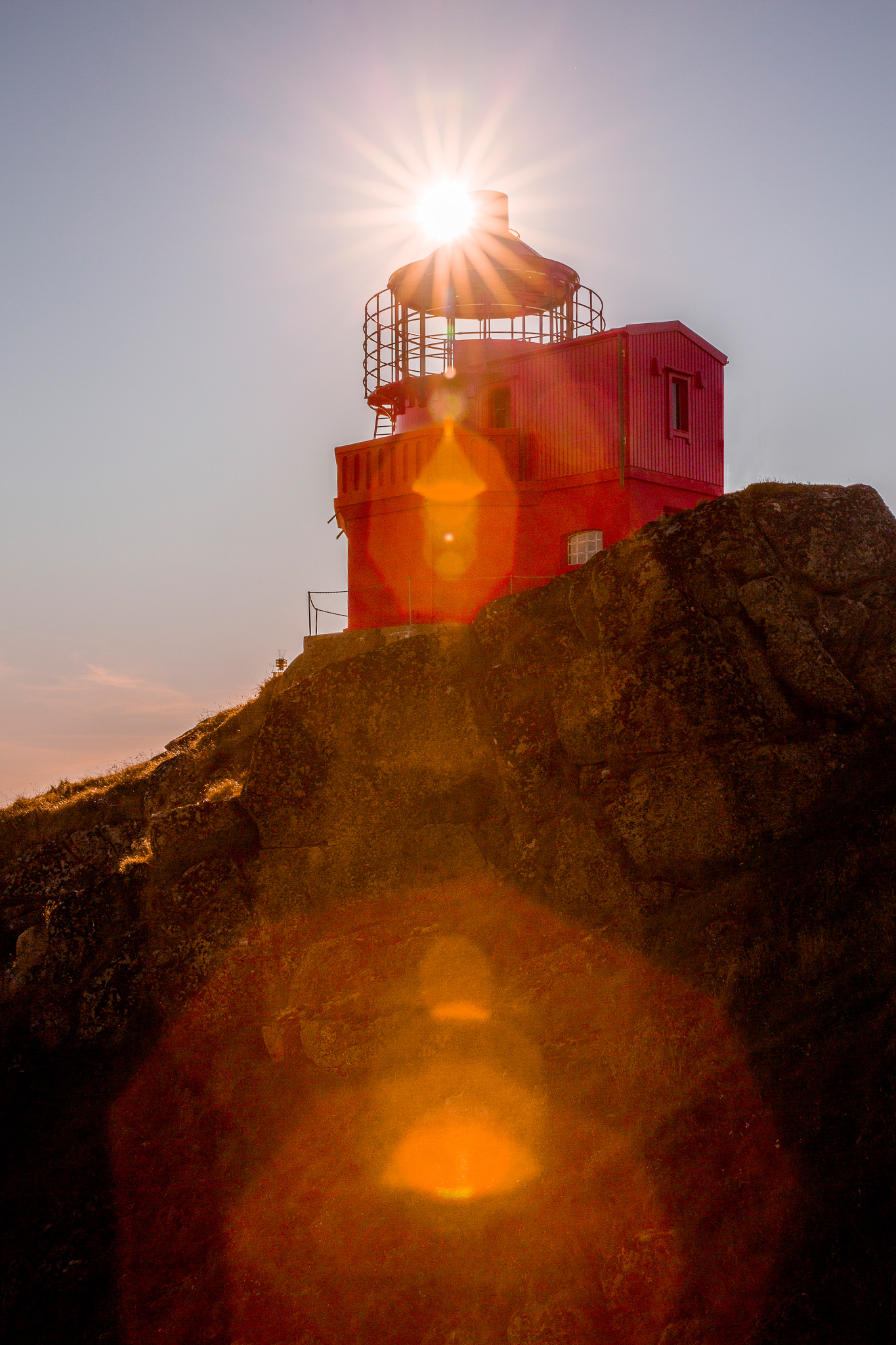
New Lighthouse Litløy fyr 2021

The Norwegian Cultural Foundation supported the restoration of Littleisland Lighthouse with a substantial grant in 2021. The main lighthouse keepers’ house was taken back to its original state when the asbestos plates were removed and the old original wooden panels were revealed. Copies of the old original windows were also installed. The lighthouse tower was sandblasted and new glasses were inserted. The tower was painted red in order to underline a new era for Littleisland Lighthouse which is now under construction to become a unique hotel suite. The red colour also differentiates the tower from Sula lighthouse and Svinøya lighthouse which have the very same architecture.

Ellen Marie Hansteensen has now lived at Littleisland Lighthouse year around for 15 years.

There have been some media coverage:

- 2006 – Television show from Litløy fyr – Littleisland Lighthouse at Norwegian Broadcasting Corporation, NRK; Norge rundt from Litløy Fyr.
- 2011 – Television documentary about Litløy fyr – Littleisland Lighthouse on Norwegian Broadcasting Corporation, NRK: "Der ingen skulle tru at nokon kunne bu".
- 2013 – Commercial video "Where no one would believe broadband could exist".
- 2016 – Television feature on Norwegian channel TV2 "God morgen Norge".
- 2023 – Television documentary on Dutch television (BNNVARA) about Ellen Marie Hansteensen and her life on Litløya; "Floortje naar het einde van de wereld" (which translates to "Floortje to the end of the world"), presented by Floortje Dessing.
- 2024 - Television documentary New Lives In The Wild with Ben Fogle

== See also ==
- Lighthouses in Norway
- List of lighthouses in Norway
