= Auvåg =

Village in Bø Municipality, Norway

- Village
- Interactive map of Auvåg
- Location within Nordland Location within Norway
- Coordinates: 68.6632°N 14.6713°E
- Country: Norway
- Region: Northern Norway
- County: Nordland
- District: Vesterålen
- Municipality: Bø Municipality
- Elevation: 24 m (79 ft)
- Time zone: UTC+01:00 (CET)
  - Summer (DST): UTC+02:00 (CEST)
- Post Code: 8475 Straumsjøen

Auvåg is a village in Bø Municipality in Nordland county, Norway. The village is located in the southeast part of the municipality along the western mouth of Jørnfjorden on the island of Langøya. It has road connections to the rest of the municipality via County Road 909, which terminates in Auvåg.
