= Straume, Nordland =

Village in Bø Municipality, Norway

Straume
- Village
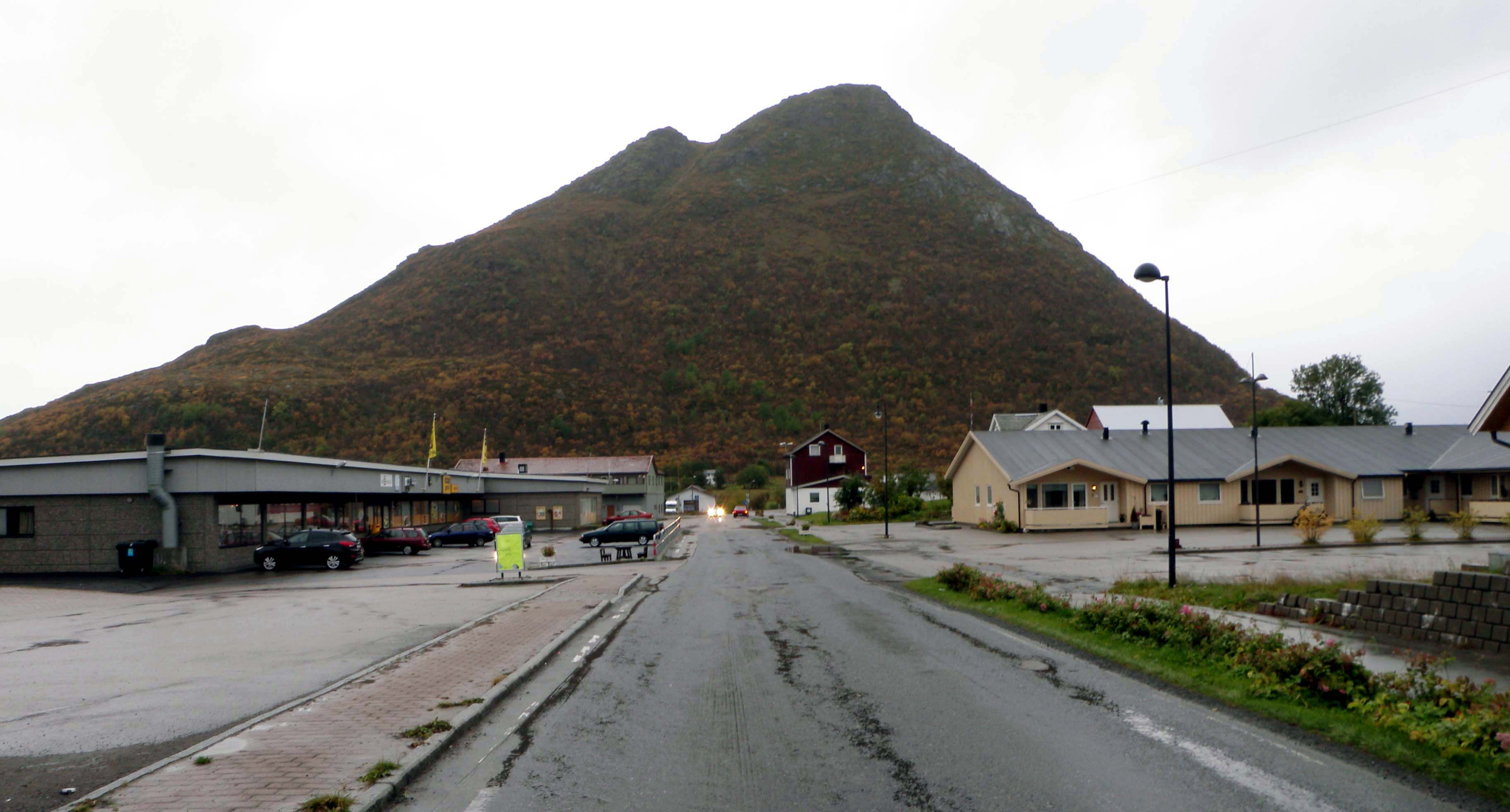
- View of the village
- Interactive map of Straume
- Location within Nordland Location within Norway
- Coordinates: 68.6890°N 14.4715°E
- Country: Norway
- Region: Northern Norway
- County: Nordland
- District: Vesterålen
- Municipality: Bø Municipality

Area
  - Total: 0.44 km^{2} (0.17 sq mi)
- Elevation: 7 m (23 ft)

Population (2023)
  - Total: 336
  - Density: 764/km^{2} (1,980/sq mi)
- Time zone: UTC+01:00 (CET)
  - Summer (DST): UTC+02:00 (CEST)
- Post Code: 8475 Straumsjøen

Straume is the administrative centre of Bø Municipality in Nordland county, Norway. The village is located on the island of Langøya in the Vesterålen archipelago. The village is located about 10 kilometres (6.2 mi) from the village of Bø (to the south) and the village of Eidet (to the north), in the west central part of the municipality.

The 0.44-square-kilometre (110-acre) village has a population (2023) of 336 and a population density of 764 inhabitants per square kilometre (1,980/sq mi).

Straume is the junction of county roads 820, 901, and 903. The Straume Nature Reserve lies south of the village.

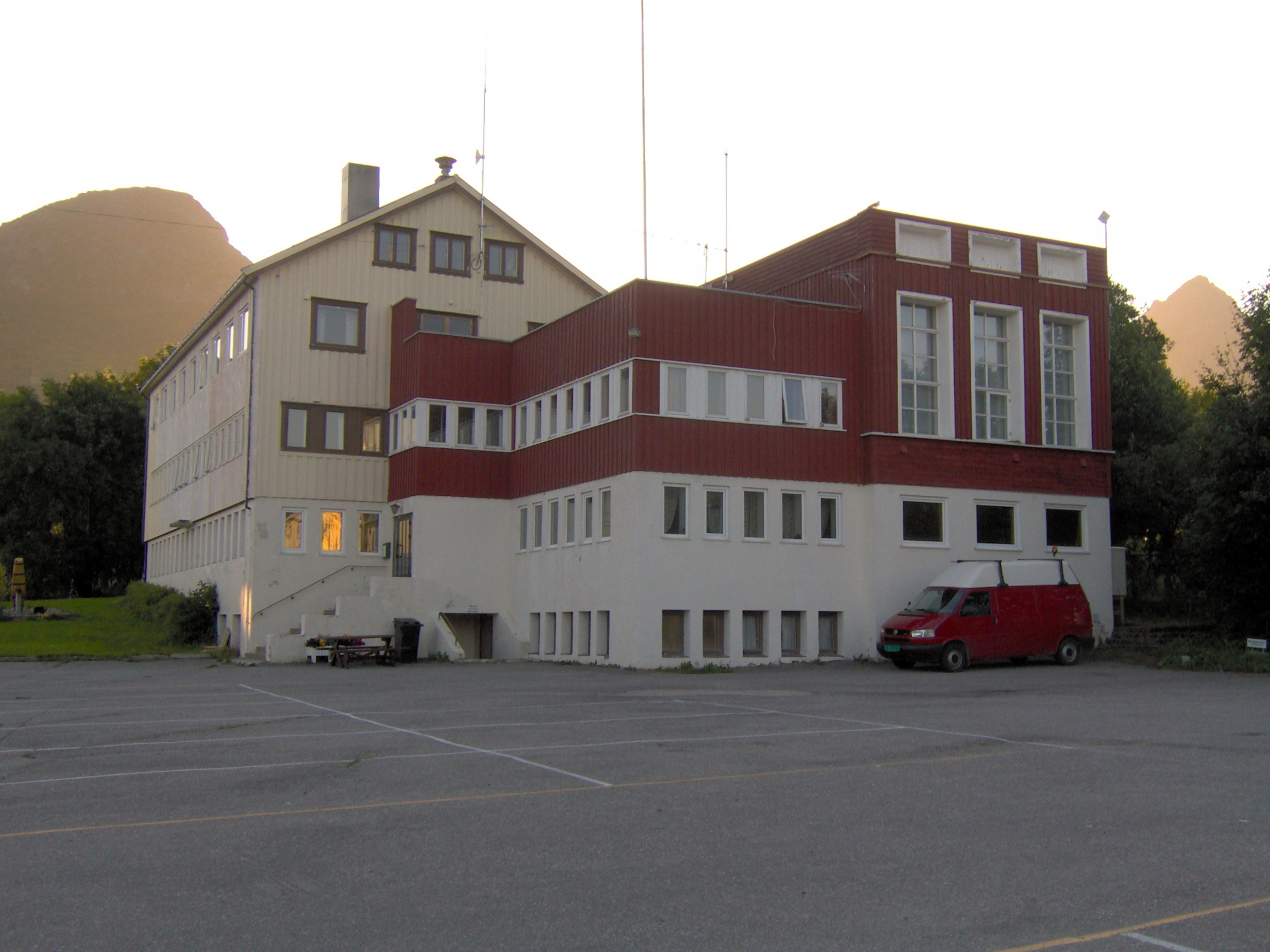
The municipal administration building in Straume
