= Bø Church (Nordland) =

- Bø kirke i Vesterålen
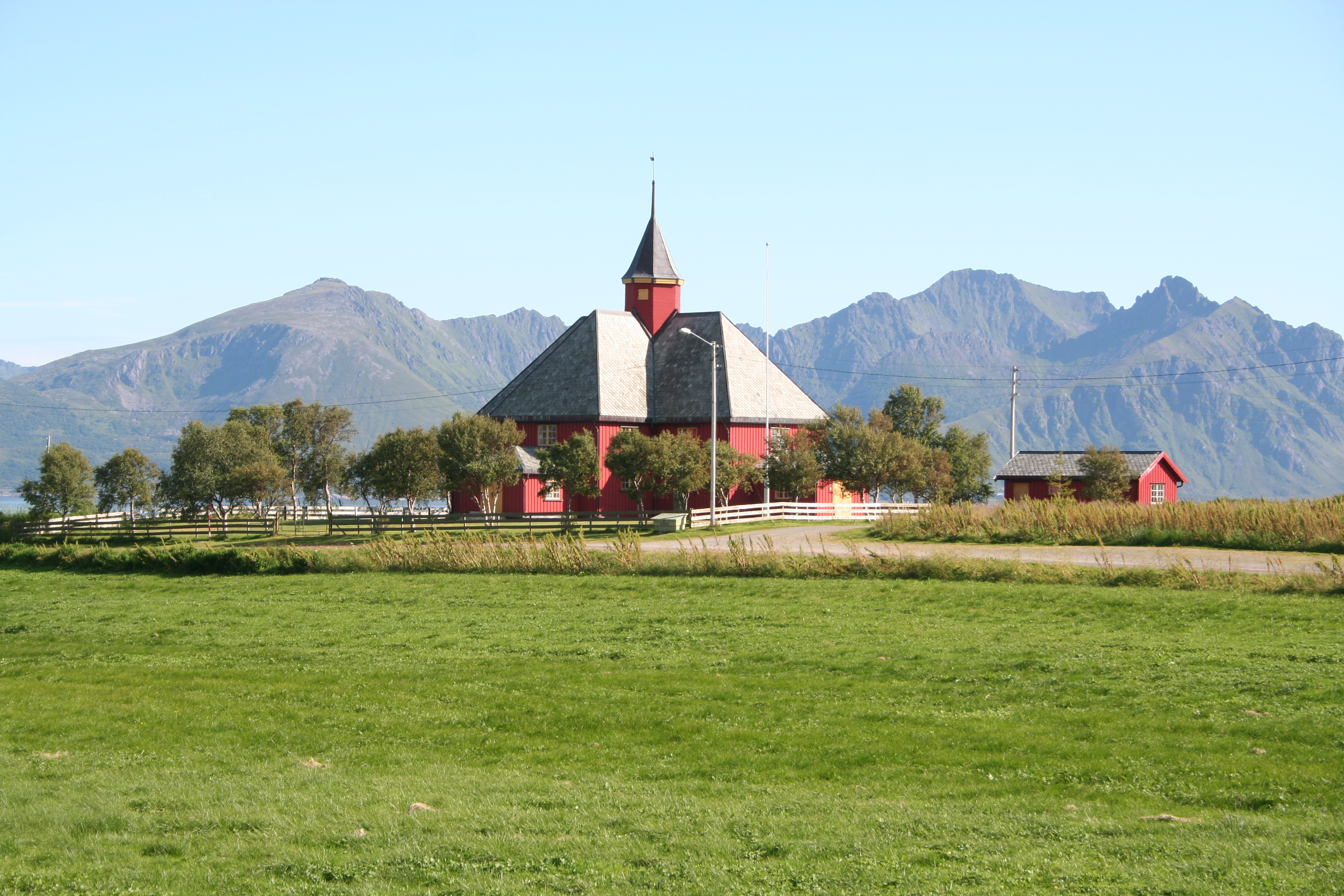
- View of the church
- Bø Church
- 68.61711116°N 14.5493209°E
- Location: Bø Municipality, Nordland
- Country: Norway
- Denomination: Church of Norway
- Churchmanship: Evangelical Lutheran

History
- Status: Parish church
- Founded: 14th century
- Consecrated: 8 Aug 1824

Architecture
- Functional status: Active
- Architectural type: Cruciform
- Completed: 1824 (202 years ago)

Specifications
- Capacity: 370
- Materials: Wood

Administration
- Diocese: Sør-Hålogaland
- Deanery: Vesterålen prosti
- Parish: Bø og Malnes
- Norwegian Cultural Heritage Site
- Type: Church
- Status: Listed
- ID: 83991

Bø Church (Norwegian: Bø kirke) is a parish church of the Church of Norway in Bø Municipality in Nordland county, Norway. It is located in the village of Bø i Vesterålen. It is one of the churches for the Bø og Malnes parish which is part of the Vesterålen prosti (deanery) in the Diocese of Sør-Hålogaland. The red, wooden church was built in a cruciform style in 1824, using plans drawn up by an unknown architect. The church seats about 370 people.

== History ==
Over the centuries, there have been several different church buildings. The first church at Bø was probably built around 1340. It is referenced in 1381, from the letters Diplomatarium Norvegicum. A new church was built around 1440, and the third approximately 1540. The fourth church was built in 1639. The fifth church building was completed in 1734, a little east of where the present church is located.

In 1814, this church served as an election church (Norwegian: valgkirke). Together with more than 300 other parish churches across Norway, it was a polling station for elections to the 1814 Norwegian Constituent Assembly which wrote the Constitution of Norway. This was Norway's first national elections. Each church parish was a constituency that elected people called "electors" who later met together in each county to elect the representatives for the assembly that was to meet at Eidsvoll Manor later that year.

In 1824, the sixth and present church was built. It was consecrated on 8 August 1824 by the Bishop Mathias Bonsach Krogh, Bishop of the Diocese of Hålogaland. The church was originally red painted, but in 1917 it was painted white. After the last restoration in 1970-1971, the church was again painted red.

=== Inventory ===
The church's fixtures are historic and include valuable objects. The pulpit is from 1762. The altar plate is characterized by the Renaissance era. German born artist Gottfried Ezekiel (ca. 1719-1798) gave the colors blue and green to the altar. The artwork around the altarpiece is in gold leaf. Ezekiel first received a commission as a painter in Bergen in 1744. Dating from 1751 he arrived in northern Norway, where he painted a number of church altarpieces.

== Media gallery ==
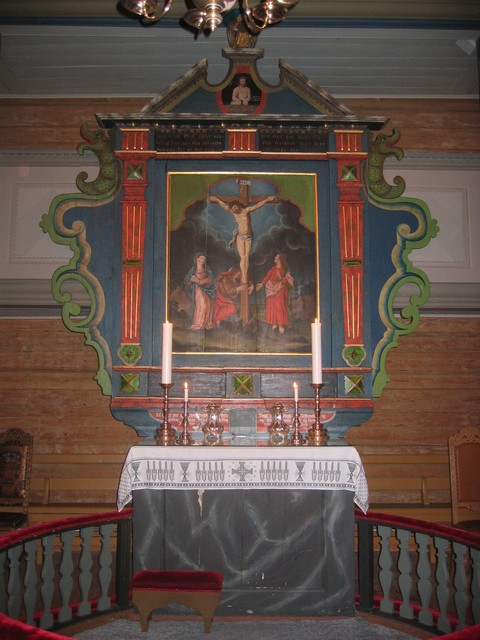
Bø kirke Altar

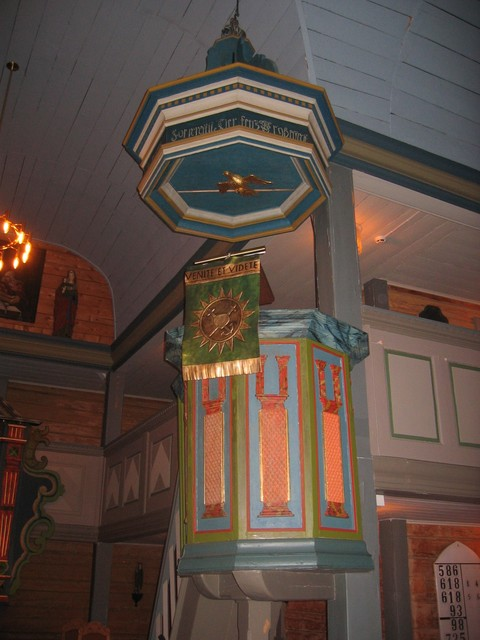
Bø kirke Pulpit

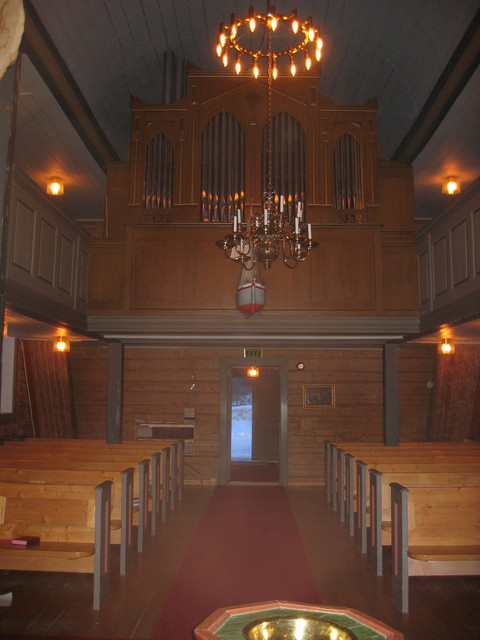
Bø kirke Sanctuary

== See also ==
- List of churches in Sør-Hålogaland
