= Vik, Sortland =

Village in Sortland Municipality, Norway

Vik
- Village
- Interactive map of Vik
- Location within Nordland Location within Norway
- Coordinates: 68.7622°N 15.2883°E
- Country: Norway
- Region: Northern Norway
- County: Nordland
- District: Vesterålen
- Municipality: Sortland Municipality
- Elevation: 5 m (16 ft)
- Time zone: UTC+01:00 (CET)
  - Summer (DST): UTC+02:00 (CEST)
- Post Code: 8400 Sortland

Vik is a village in Sortland Municipality in Nordland county, Norway. The village is located on the island of Langøya, about 13 kilometers (8.1 mi) north of the town of Sortland.

The Vik farm previously comprised an area completely from the isthmus Vikeid in the west to Gåsfjord in the northeast, spanning 6 kilometers (3.7 mi) between its furthers points. Today, however, Vik is considered limited to the middle of this larger area. Vik lies on the north side of the inlet Vikosen, the outlet of the river Vikelva. The valley Vikdalen and the lake Vikvatnet lie north of Vik. The island Vikøya lies in the Sortlandsundet strait east of Vik and across the bay entrance Vikbotn. Vik is connected to the town of Sortland by County Road 956, which branches off of County Road 820 at the Vik Bridge where the river Vikelva empties into the inlet Vikosen.

Vik has a long history and is one of the oldest inhabited places in Sortland. It was mentioned in a letter dating from 1400, and its name was recorded as Viick, Wiigh, and Wiig in the past. It the 1840s, a considerable number of people moved to Vik from Voss.

Although Sortland Municipality does not have a strongly developed fishing industry, fishermen live across large parts of the municipality, especially in Vik.

The shallow water of the Vik Inlet is protected as the Vik Inlet Nature Reserve, particularly because of its importance as an area for the pink-footed goose during spring.
