= Grethe Gynnild Johnsen =

Norwegian journalist

Grethe Gynnild Johnsen (born 18 April 1959 in Bø i Vesterålen) is a Norwegian journalist. From 2004 to 2008 she was responsible for news production at the Norwegian Broadcasting Corporation headquarters in Oslo. That includes Dagsrevyen, Dagsnytt, the news channel NRK2, NRK Alltid Nyheter and the news production for nrk.no. Currently she is director for all regional offices for NRK.

She has previously worked as a reporter, correspondent in Copenhagen and editor of NRK Sports.
