= Straume Nature Reserve =

Protected area in Norway

- Straume naturreservat
- IUCN category Ia (strict nature reserve)
- Interactive map of Straume Nature Reserve
- Location: Vesterålen, Norway
- Nearest city: Straume
- Coordinates: 68°40′59.8″N 14°28′13.9″E
- Area: 355.9 ha (879 acres)
- Established: 2002

The Straume Nature Reserve (Norwegian: Straume naturreservat) is located in Bø Municipality in Nordland county, Norway.

The nature reserve lies south of the village of Straume on the west side of the island of Langøya. It includes two lakes—Førevatnet and Saltvatnet—and a shallow inlet called Skjørisen. It covers an area of 165.4 hectares (409 acres), of which 133.9 hectares (331 acres) is water. The area is protected to preserve the central parts of an important wetland area with natural vegetation and wildlife, and especially a rich and specialized bird population. The nature reserve was established on December 19, 1997. Norwegian County Road 820 passes between the two halves of the nature reserve.
