= Klakksjorda =

Village in Bø Municipality, Norway

Klakksjorda Klakkjorda
- Village
- Interactive map of Klakksjorda
- Location within Nordland Location within Norway
- Coordinates: 68.6957°N 14.6716°E
- Country: Norway
- Region: Northern Norway
- County: Nordland
- District: Vesterålen
- Municipality: Bø Municipality
- Elevation: 3 m (9.8 ft)
- Time zone: UTC+01:00 (CET)
  - Summer (DST): UTC+02:00 (CEST)
- Post Code: 8475 Straumsjøen

Klakksjorda (or Klakkjorda or Klaksjord)) is a village in Bø Municipality in Nordland county, Norway. The village is located along the Jørnfjorden in the southeastern part of the island of Langøya. Historically, the name was also spelled Klagsjord, Klachsiord, and Klachsjord.

The road leading out of Klakksjorda (called Klakksjordveien or "Klakksjord Road"), connects to Norwegian County Road 911 which connects it to other settlements on Langøya.
