= Litløya =

Island in Vesterålen, Norway

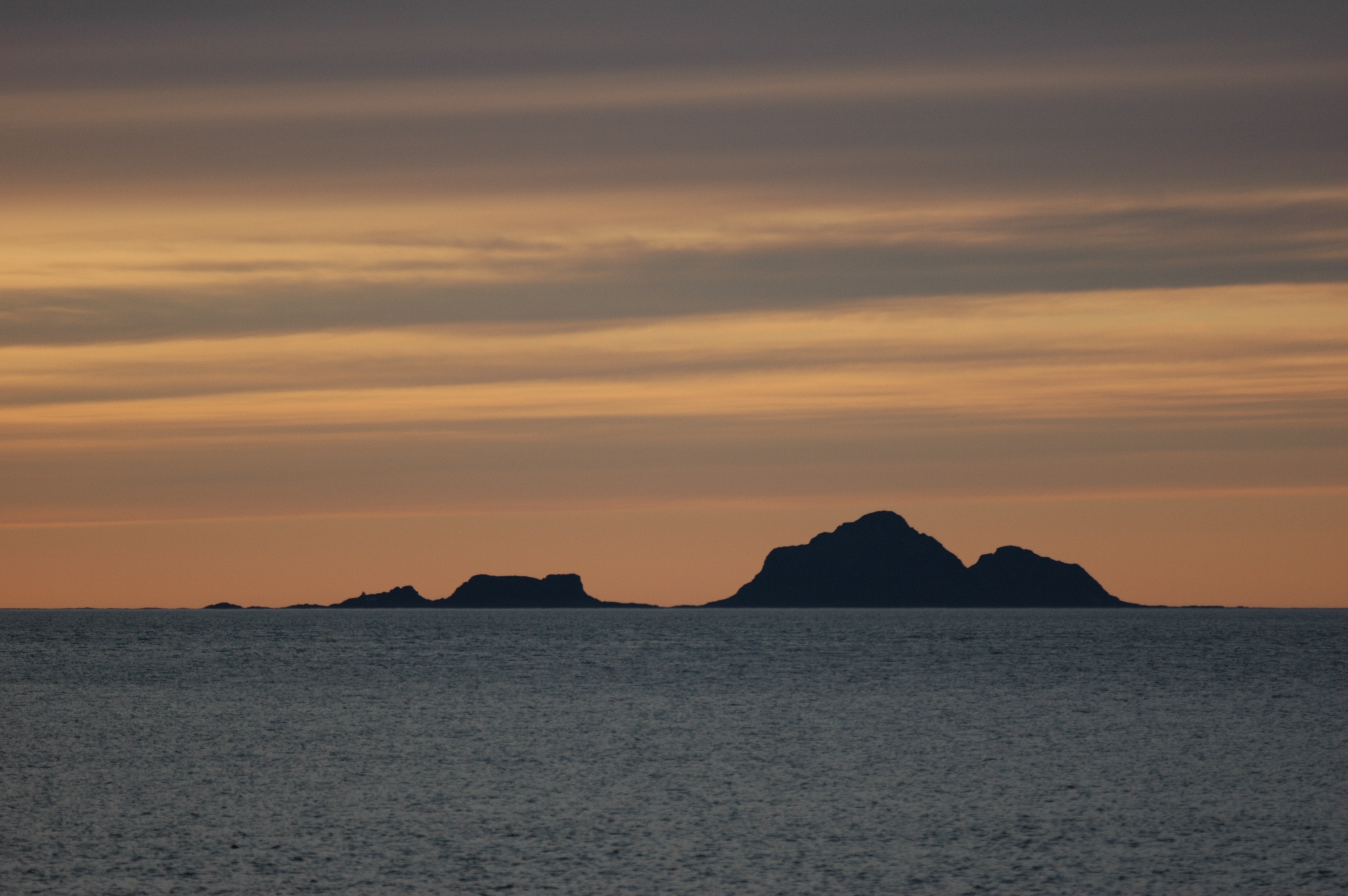
- Litløya (left) and Gaukværøya (right) (seen from Lofoten)
- Interactive map of Litløya

Geography
- Location: Nordland, Norway
- Coordinates: 68.5960°N 14.3207°E
- Archipelago: Vesterålen
- Area: 0.67 km^{2} (0.26 sq mi)
- Highest elevation: 103 m (338 ft)
- Highest point: Litløytinden

Administration
- Norway
- County: Nordland
- Municipality: Bø Municipality

Litløya (lit. 'Little Island') is a small island in Bø Municipality in Nordland county, Norway. It is part of the Vesterålen archipelago, about 3 kilometres (1.9 mi) southwest of the village of Bø on the coast of the large island of Langøya. The 0.67-square-kilometre (0.26 sq mi) island is best known for the Litløy Lighthouse located on the western part of the island. Its highest point on the island is the 103-metre (338 ft) tall Litløytinden.

== History ==
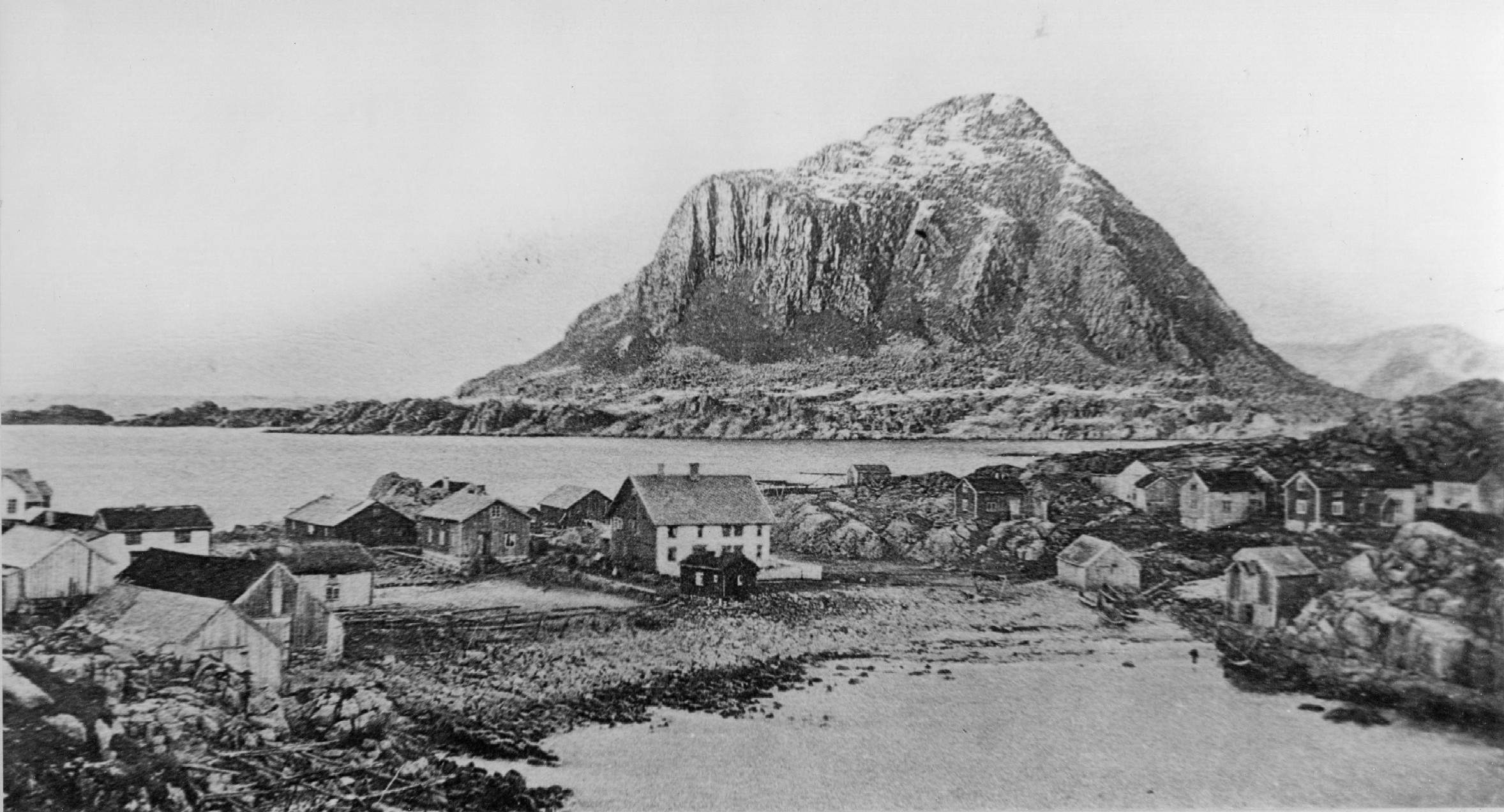
The village Tarvågen on Litløya overlooking the neighbour island Gaukværøya, sometime late in the 1800s.

From the Middle Ages until the 20th century, the island (together with its neighbour Gaukværøya) was a busy seaport and centre for local fishermen.

There were 71 inhabitants registered on Litløya in 1865. Fishing was the main source of income for the residents and when the cod arrived in springtime many regional neighbours came flocking to take part. In 1895, there were 875 fishermen registered at Litløya and Gaukværøya, and in 1890 there were 880 inhabitants registered. These numbers probably included fishermen from other municipalities who were living there temporarily.

Once inhabitants on the "mainland" (the large Langøya island) got electricity, water, and phone connections and boats became motorised, many inhabitants left the islands for a more comfortable life. Those who stayed on the island were offered government support to move to the "mainland" in the 1950s. Since then, the island has been virtually uninhabited and some remains of the houses still exist. Currently, the island's only permanent inhabitant is the owner of Litløy Lighthouse, though various support staff are often present to help with renovations and daily tasks. The lighthouse currently offers overnight accommodation for visitors as well.

== Attractions ==
There is also a cave on Litløya, called «Trollhola». This means "Cave of the troll". The cave is 40 metres (130 ft) deep and can be explored with a flashlight or headlamp. Access to the cave is slightly cumbersome. The cave was formed whilst this part of the island was under water, possibly 100,000 years ago, according to NGU, Norsk Geologisk Undersøkelse.

The county archaeologist visited Litløya and Gaukværøya in the spring of 2010. Several sites from the Stone Age, Iron Age, and Middle Ages were identified, including two farms and a grave that possibly contains a boat. A coastal path is currently being established in order to share the current knowledge of the island with visitors.
