= Bø, Vesterålen =

Village in Bø Municipality, Norway

Bø Bø i Vesterålen
- Village
- View of the village
- Interactive map of Bø
- Location within Nordland Location within Norway
- Coordinates: 68.6208°N 14.4467°E
- Country: Norway
- Region: Northern Norway
- County: Nordland
- District: Vesterålen
- Municipality: Bø Municipality

Area
  - Total: 0.8 km^{2} (0.31 sq mi)
- Elevation: 7 m (23 ft)

Population (2023)
  - Total: 589
  - Density: 736/km^{2} (1,910/sq mi)
- Time zone: UTC+01:00 (CET)
  - Summer (DST): UTC+02:00 (CEST)
- Post Code: 8470 Bø i Vesterålen

Bø or Vinje is a village in Bø Municipality in Nordland county, Norway. The village is located on the southwest shore of the large island of Langøya, looking out towards the small island of Litløya. Norwegian County Road 820 runs through the village. Bø Church stands just east of the village.

The urban area of "Bø" is actually a name used by Statistics Norway to refer to the three smaller villages of Vinje, Steine, and Skagan which have grown together due to conurbation and now form one large urban area. The 0.8-square-kilometre (200-acre) village has a population (2023) of 589 and a population density of 736 inhabitants per square kilometre (1,910/sq mi).

== Climate ==
Bø has a subpolar oceanic climate (Köppen Cfc), and is close to a temperate oceanic climate. Bø is the northernmost location in the world with all monthly means above 0 °C (32 °F). The current weather station is on the south coast of the island. An earlier weather station was located more inland on the island in a flat marshy area, and had recorded up to 30 °C (86 °F) in July and down to −20 °C (−4 °F) in February.

Climate data for Bø i Vesterålen 1991–2020 (8 m, extremes 2003–2023)
Month	Jan	Feb	Mar	Apr	May	Jun	Jul	Aug	Sep	Oct	Nov	Dec	Year
Record high °C (°F)	9 (48)	8 (46)	10 (50)	17.2 (63.0)	22.4 (72.3)	27.6 (81.7)	28.8 (83.8)	28.4 (83.1)	20.6 (69.1)	16.6 (61.9)	13 (55)	9.5 (49.1)	28.8 (83.8)
Daily mean °C (°F)	0.8 (33.4)	0.1 (32.2)	0.7 (33.3)	3 (37)	6.5 (43.7)	9.8 (49.6)	12.5 (54.5)	12.3 (54.1)	9.7 (49.5)	5.8 (42.4)	3.5 (38.3)	1.8 (35.2)	5.5 (41.9)
Record low °C (°F)	−11.4 (11.5)	−11.6 (11.1)	−9.8 (14.4)	−6.4 (20.5)	−2.7 (27.1)	0.9 (33.6)	4.7 (40.5)	2.8 (37.0)	0.7 (33.3)	−4.3 (24.3)	−7.7 (18.1)	−9.2 (15.4)	−11.6 (11.1)
Average precipitation mm (inches)	83 (3.3)	71 (2.8)	73 (2.9)	53 (2.1)	47 (1.9)	41 (1.6)	49 (1.9)	57 (2.2)	84 (3.3)	99 (3.9)	96 (3.8)	99 (3.9)	852 (33.6)
Source: Norwegian Meteorological Institute

Climate data for Bø i Vesterålen 1961–1990
Month	Jan	Feb	Mar	Apr	May	Jun	Jul	Aug	Sep	Oct	Nov	Dec	Year
Mean daily maximum °C (°F)	0.8 (33.4)	0.6 (33.1)	1.6 (34.9)	4.2 (39.6)	9.2 (48.6)	12.7 (54.9)	15.2 (59.4)	14.7 (58.5)	10.8 (51.4)	6.9 (44.4)	3.4 (38.1)	1.5 (34.7)	6.8 (44.2)
Daily mean °C (°F)	−1.4 (29.5)	−1.5 (29.3)	−0.6 (30.9)	1.9 (35.4)	6.4 (43.5)	9.7 (49.5)	12.1 (53.8)	11.9 (53.4)	8.3 (46.9)	4.8 (40.6)	1.4 (34.5)	−0.8 (30.6)	4.4 (39.9)
Mean daily minimum °C (°F)	−4.6 (23.7)	−4.7 (23.5)	−3.6 (25.5)	−0.9 (30.4)	3.0 (37.4)	6.6 (43.9)	8.9 (48.0)	8.5 (47.3)	5.5 (41.9)	2.2 (36.0)	−1.4 (29.5)	−3.8 (25.2)	1.3 (34.3)
Average precipitation mm (inches)	88 (3.5)	81 (3.2)	70 (2.8)	63 (2.5)	48 (1.9)	56 (2.2)	73 (2.9)	74 (2.9)	110 (4.3)	144 (5.7)	103 (4.1)	107 (4.2)	1,017 (40.0)
Average precipitation days (≥ 1 mm)	15.4	13.8	13.2	12.7	10.3	10.5	12.7	11.6	16.5	18.8	17.2	17.8	170.3
Source: Norwegian Meteorological Institute
