= Norwegian County Road 820 =

County road in Nordland, Norway

County Road 820

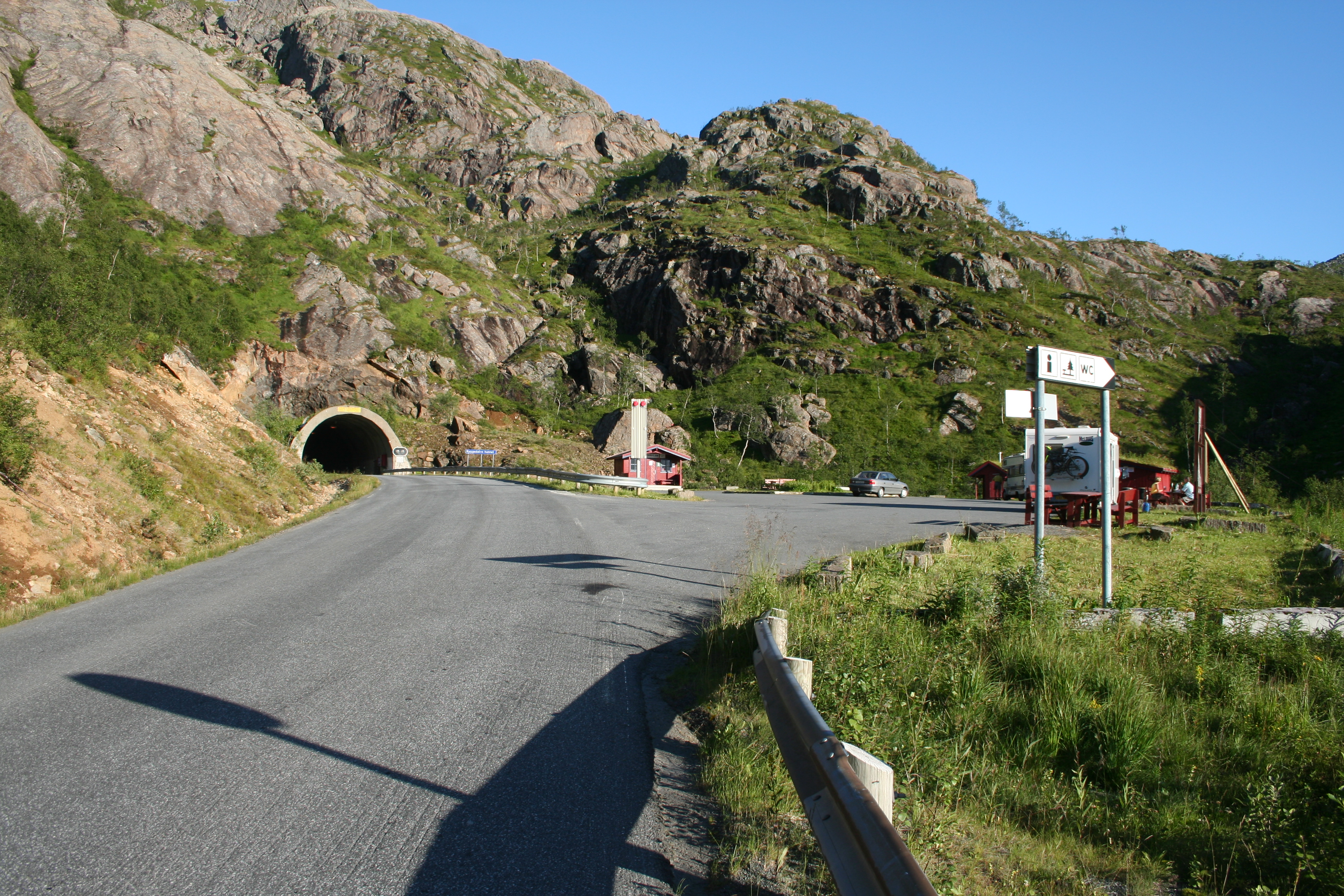
- County Road 820 exiting the Ryggedal Tunnel

Route information
- Length: 73.1 km (45.4 mi)

Major junctions
- South end: Fv901 at Straumsnes, Bø Municipality
- Fv901 at Straume; Fv903 at Straume; Fv911 at Skålbrekka; Fv915 at Rise; Fv913 at Rottåsen; Fv918 at Ramnåsen; Fv919 at Strømneset; Fv950 at Skjelsfjord; Fv955 at Selnesvann; Fv821 at Frøskeland; Fv885 at Frøskeland; Fv956 at Vik
- North end: Sortland Bridge, Sortland Municipality

Location
- Country: Norway
- Counties: Nordland

Highway system
- Roads in Norway; National Roads; County Roads

County Road 820 (Norwegian: Fylkesvei 820) is a 73.1-kilometer (45.4 mi) road in Bø Municipality, Øksnes Municipality, and Sortland Municipality in Nordland County, Norway. It starts in the village of Straumsnes in Bø Municipality where it continues south from County Road 901, circles around the west end of the island of Langøya through the Straume Nature Reserve to the village of Straume, and continues east to the Ryggedal Tunnel. It then passes through Øksnes Municipality along the west shore of Ånnfjord and south shore of Skjellfjord before entering Sortland Municipality. There it passes along the inner shore of Eidsfjord through Frøskeland, crosses Vikeid (the Vik Isthmus), where County Road 956 branches off to Vik, and then runs past the southwest shore of the Vikosen Nature Reserve and along the west side of Sortlandssundet strait, where it terminates at the town of Sortland.

Prior to January 1, 2010, the route was a national road. After the national road network regional reform came into force, the route was reassigned the status of a county road.
