= Norwegian County Road 956 =

County road in Sortland, Norway

County Road 956

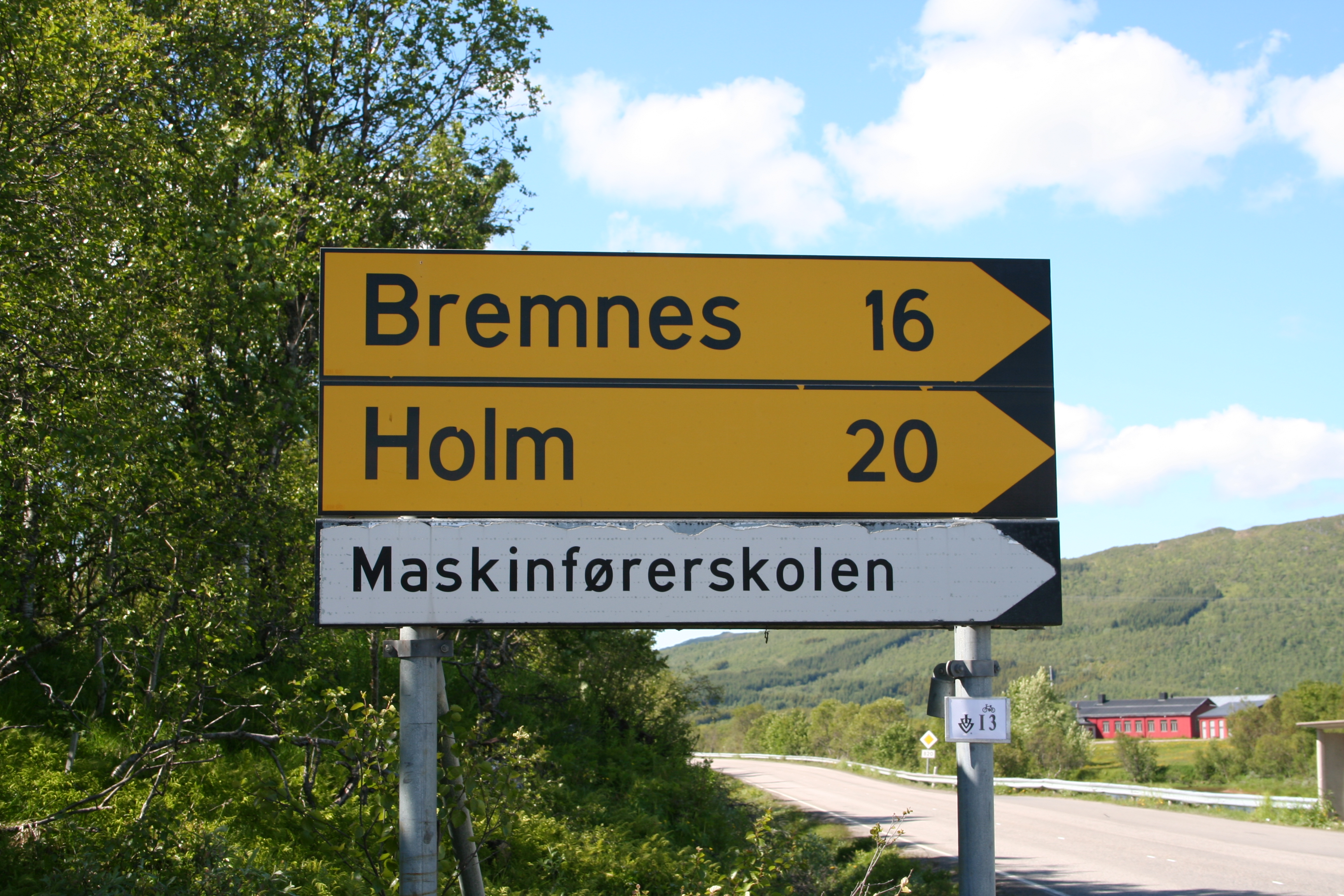
- Intersection with County Road 820

Route information
- Length: 15.9 km (9.9 mi)

Major junctions
- South end: Fv820 at Vik
- North end: Bremnes

Location
- Country: Norway
- Counties: Nordland

Highway system
- Roads in Norway; National Roads; County Roads

County Road 956 (Norwegian: Fylkesvei 956) is a 15.9-kilometer (9.9 mi) road in Sortland Municipality in Nordland County, Norway.

It starts near the village of Vik, where it branches off to the north from County Road 820 and then follows the west side of Sortlandsundet strait to the village of Bremnes. A small, local road branches off Fv956 just south of Bremnes and continues northwards towards the village of Holm at the end of a small peninsula; together with this stretch, the combined road length is 19.9 kilometers (12.4 mi). The road is mostly flat, with its highest point at an elevation of about 30 meters (98 ft) above sea level at Nevernes.

== History ==
Originally, small roads were built between the farms in the area, like many other places in Vesterålen. The interconnecting road between these farm roads and the whole way around the Gåsfjorden was built in 1930. Later, the road was assigned the status of a county road. The side road to Holm was also classified as a county road, but it was downgraded to a municipal road in the 1980s. The road to Bremnes was asphalted in the late 1980s and early 1990s. The road to Holm is still paved with gravel.

The road along the south side of Gåsfjorden was formerly often closed in the winter due to snow. In the early 1990s the road was widened and some embankments were built, eliminating the problem with the snow.

County Road 956 has some heavy traffic because of waste transportation to the dump run by the waste company Reno-Vest in Bremnes.
