= Straume (surname) =

Straume is a surname meaning "stream”, "flow” or "tidal current” in a variety of European languages. Notable people with the surname include:

- Eilif Straume, Norwegian writer and critic
- Gisle Straume, Norwegian actor and theatre director
- Jānis Straume, Latvian politician
- Krists Straume, Latvian sprint canoeist
- Unni Straume, Norwegian film director and screenwriter
- Vilnis Straume, Latvian footballer

Fictional characters:

- Miles Straume, fictional character played by Ken Leung on the ABC television series Lost
