= Holmstad =

Village in Sortland Municipality, Norway

- Village
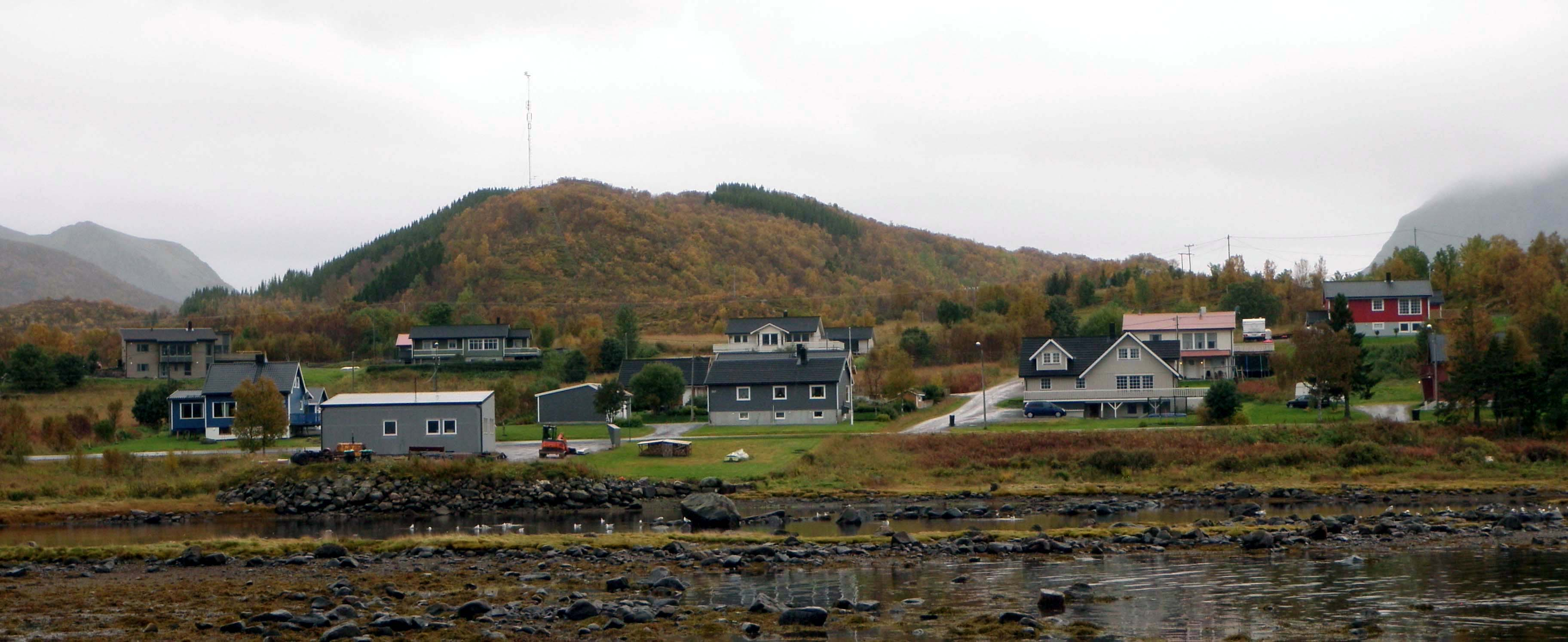
- Seaside view of the village
- Interactive map of Holmstad
- Location within Nordland Location within Norway
- Coordinates: 68.7223°N 15.1473°E
- Country: Norway
- Region: Northern Norway
- County: Nordland
- District: Vesterålen
- Municipality: Sortland Municipality
- Elevation: 5 m (16 ft)
- Time zone: UTC+01:00 (CET)
  - Summer (DST): UTC+02:00 (CEST)
- Post Code: 8415 Sortland

Holmstad is a village in Sortland Municipality in Nordland county, Norway. The village is located along the Eidsfjorden on the island of Langøya, about 12 kilometres (7.5 mi) west of the town of Sortland. Indre Eidsfjord Church is located in this village.
