= Jørnfjorden =

Fjord in Nordland, Norway

- Interactive map of the fjord
- Location: Nordland county, Norway
- Coordinates: 68.6850°N 14.6962°E
- Type: Fjord
- Basin countries: Norway
- Max. length: 7 kilometres (4.3 mi)
- Max. width: 1.3 kilometres (0.81 mi)
- Max. depth: 67 metres (220 ft)

Jørnfjorden is a fjord in Bø Municipality in Nordland county, Norway. The 7-kilometre (4.3 mi) long fjord is an arm of Eidsfjorden, cutting into the large island of Langøya in the Vesterålen archipelago. The inlet to the ford lies between the villages of Straumsnes to the west and Guvåg to the east. The fjord extends 7 kilometers (4.3 mi) north to the village of Verhalsen. The fjord reaches a depth of 67 metres (220 ft) just northeast of the small village of Auvåg.

The village of Auvåg lies on the west side of the fjord slightly past the inlet, and the village of Røsnes lies on the opposite shore, to the east. Immediately north of Auvåg there are two bays, Nordvåg and Langfjord. A small fjord arm further into the fjord, to the northeast, is named Kvernfjord. It extends 800 meters (2,600 ft) inland to a village of the same name. The village of Klakksjorda lies on the other side, along an arm of the fjord named Vestfjord.

County Road 913 runs along the entire east side of the fjord.
