= Eidsfjorden (Nordland) =

Fjord in Nordland, Norway

Eidsfjorden (Norwegian); Nuorrevuotna (Northern Sami)
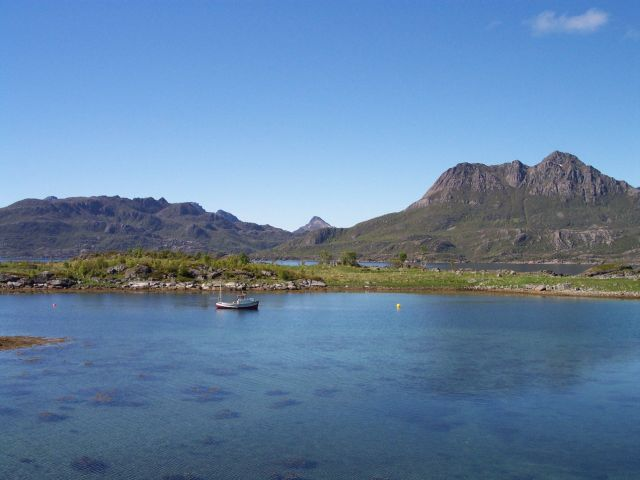
- View of the fjord
- Interactive map of the fjord
- Location: Nordland county, Norway
- Coordinates: 68.6643°N 14.8935°E
- Type: Fjord
- Basin countries: Vesterålen, Norway
- Max. length: 25 kilometres (16 mi)
- Settlements: Holmstad

Eidsfjorden (Norwegian) or Nuorrevuotna (Northern Sami) is a fjord in Nordland county, Norway. The 25-kilometre (16 mi) long fjord cuts into the island of Langøya in the Vesterålen archipelago. The fjord branches off of the main Vesterålsfjorden which is part of Norwegian Sea. The innermost part of the fjord is part of Sortland Municipality. The outer part of the fjord is split with the western coast belonging to Bø Municipality and the eastern coast belonging to Hadsel Municipality.

Several small fjords branch north from the fjord: Jørnfjorden, Hellfjorden, Melfjorden, Olderfjorden, and Bjørndalsfjorden.

There are two churches located along the fjord: Indre Eidsfjord Church and Ytre Eidsfjord Church (meaning "inner" and "outer" Eidsfjord churches). Norwegian County Road 820 runs along the inner shore of the fjord.

== See also ==
- List of Norwegian fjords
