= Bø Municipality (Nordland) =

Municipality in Nordland, Norway

Bø Municipality Bø kommune
- Municipality
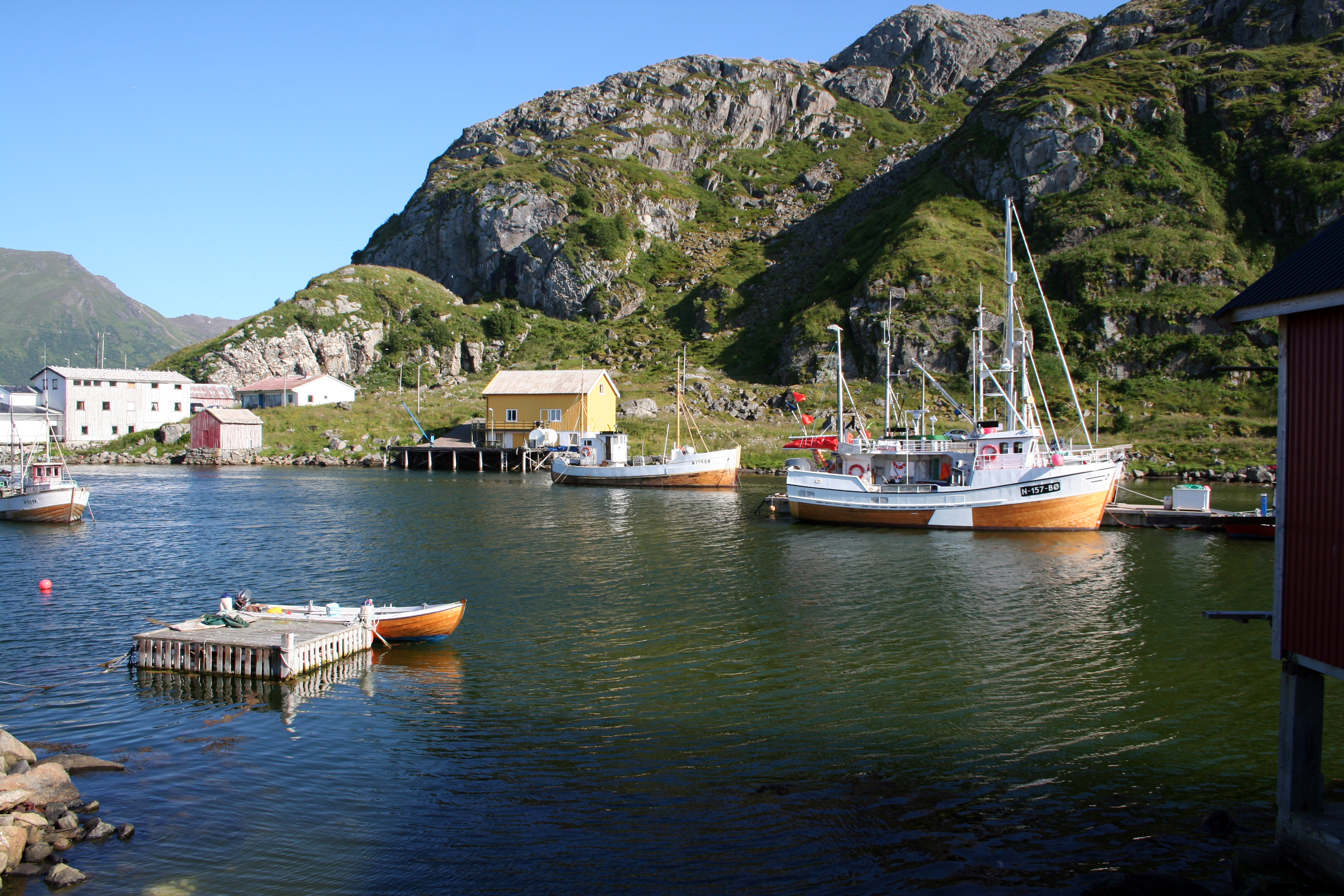

- Flag Coat of arms

- Nordland within Norway

- Bø within Nordland
- Coordinates: 68°41′43″N 14°34′46″E
- Country: Norway
- County: Nordland
- District: Vesterålen
- Established: 1 Jan 1838
  - Created as: Formannskapsdistrikt
- Administrative centre: Straume

Government
  - Mayor (2007): Sture Pedersen (H)

Area
  - Total: 246.72 km^{2} (95.26 sq mi)
  - Land: 234.90 km^{2} (90.70 sq mi)
  - Water: 11.82 km^{2} (4.56 sq mi) 4.8%
  - Rank: #289 in Norway
- Highest elevation: 694.61 m (2,278.9 ft)

Population (2024)
  - Total: 2,634
  - Rank: #249 in Norway
  - Density: 10.7/km^{2} (28/sq mi)
  - Change (10 years): ▼ −0.3%
- Demonym: Bøfjerding

Official language
  - Norwegian form: Neutral
- Time zone: UTC+01:00 (CET)
  - Summer (DST): UTC+02:00 (CEST)
- ISO 3166 code: NO-1867
- Website: Official website

Bø is a municipality in Nordland county, Norway. It is part of the Vesterålen region. The administrative centre of the municipality is the village of Straume which is where municipal administration, a grocery store, and a gasoline station are located. In addition to this, the urban area of Bø (including Steine and Vinje), which is the largest urban area in the municipality and it has a grocery, liquor store, swimming pool, movie theater, Bø Church, and additional service infrastructure. Other smaller villages include Gimstad, Fjærvoll, Straumsjøen, Skårvågen, Søberg, Malnes, Eidet, Guvåg, Hovden, Klakksjorda, Nykvåg, Utskor, Ringstad, and Vågen.

The 247-square-kilometre (95 sq mi) municipality is the 289th largest by area out of the 357 municipalities in Norway. Bø Municipality is the 249th most populous municipality in Norway with a population of 2,634. The municipality's population density is 10.7 inhabitants per square kilometre (28/sq mi) and its population has decreased by 0.3% over the previous 10-year period.

The Litløy Lighthouse is located on the tiny island of Litløya off the coast of Bø.

== General information ==
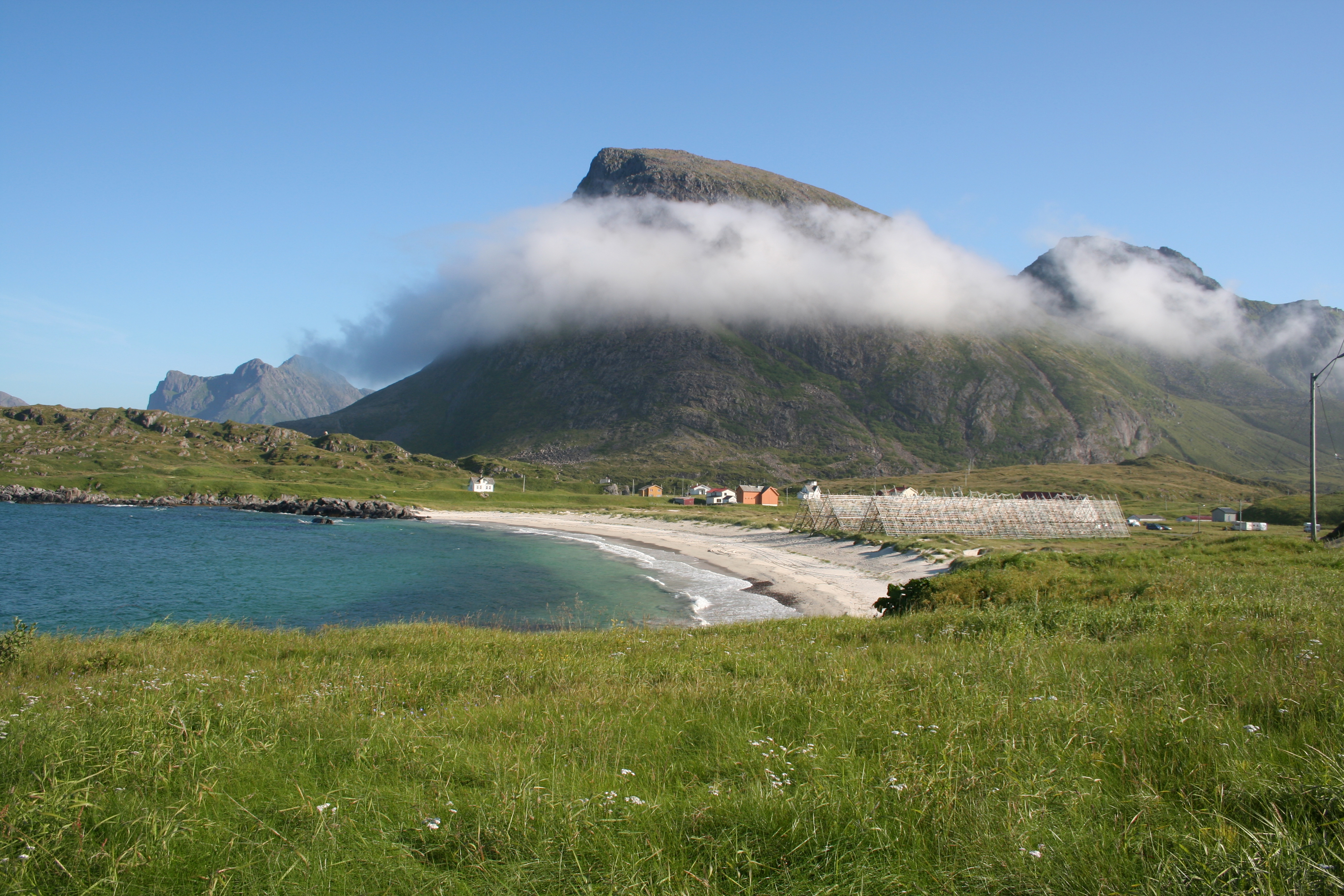
Hovden in Bø municipality

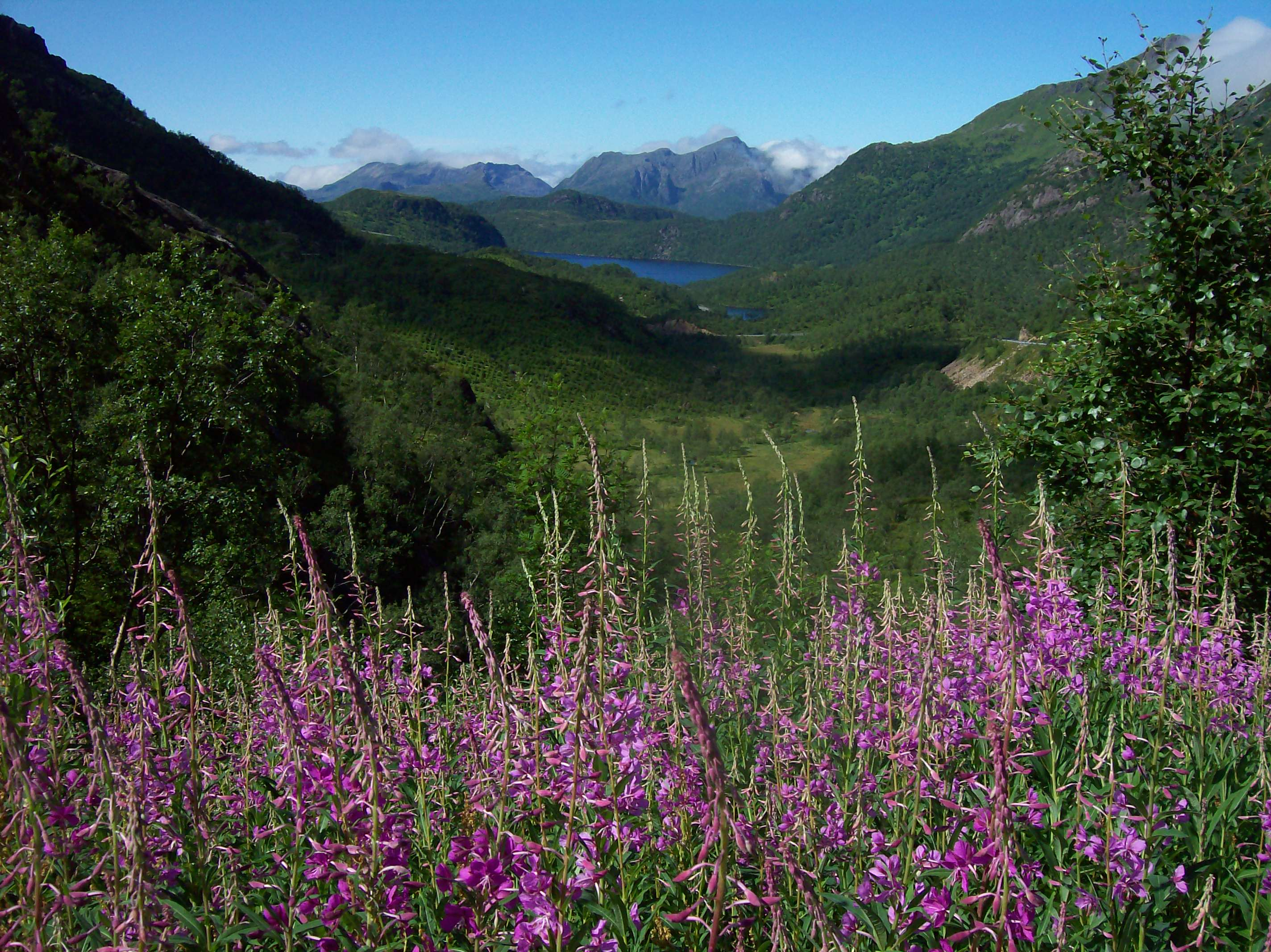
View towards Ryggedalsvatnet lake in the distance, northern part of Bø

The municipality of Bø was established on 1 January 1838 (see formannskapsdistrikt law). On 1 January 1866, a small area of the neighboring Øksnes Municipality (population: 40) was transferred to Bø Municipality. On 1 January 1964, the Kråkberget village and the peninsula north of the village (population: 271) was transferred from the neighboring Øksnes Municipality to Bø Municipality.

=== Name ===
The municipality (originally the parish) is named after the old Bø farm (Old Norse: Bœr) since the first Bø Church was built there. The name is identical to the word bœr which means "farm" or "farmstead". It is a cognate with the Dutch language word boer which means "farmer".

=== Coat of arms ===
The coat of arms was granted on 7 August 1987. The official blazon is "Sable, a demi-boat argent with a mast and a square sail" (Norwegian: I svart en halv sølv båt med mast og råseil). This means the arms have a black field (background) and the charge is a half-boat with a mast and a square sail. The boat has a tincture of argent which means it is commonly colored white, but if it is made out of metal, then silver is used. This was chosen to represent the importance of fishing in Bø, but also reminiscent of some old legends/fairy tales in the region that include a "half boat". (The sea ghost draugr travelled in a half boat.) The arms were designed by Rolf Tidemann.

=== Churches ===
The Church of Norway has one parish (sokn) within Bø Municipality. It is part of the Vesterålen prosti (deanery) in the Diocese of Sør-Hålogaland.

Churches in Bø Municipality
| Parish (sokn) | Church name | Location of the church | Year built |
|---|---|---|---|
| Bø og Malnes | Bø Church | Bø | 1824 |
| Bø og Malnes | Malnes Church | Eidet | 1895 |

== Population ==
The municipality has sustained a steady decline in population since the 1950s when 6,122 people lived in Bø. The 2001 census showed that the population had declined to 3,156, while the fourth quarter population estimate for 2007 showed the population at 2,866. The bureau of statistics projects a continued population decline.

The municipality has 73 numbered farms (gårdsnummer) in the cadastre. The largest and densest population center is the Vinje, Skagen, and Steine area in the southwestern part of the municipality, which is designated as the village of "Bø" by Statistics Norway.

== Government ==
Bø Municipality is responsible for primary education (through 10th grade), outpatient health services, senior citizen services, welfare and other social services, zoning, economic development, and municipal roads and utilities. The municipality is governed by a municipal council of directly elected representatives. The mayor is indirectly elected by a vote of the municipal council. The municipality is under the jurisdiction of the Midtre Hålogaland District Court and the Hålogaland Court of Appeal.

=== Taxation ===
In 2020, the municipality announced a reduction in its wealth tax, creating a tax shelter unique in Norway, in order to encourage population growth. The state charges a 0.85% wealth tax on an individual's global assets above 1.5 million kr. Of this, 0.15% goes to the state, and the remaining 0.7% goes to the individual's municipality of residence. Bø Municipality announced that after January 2021, it would reduce its stake to just from 0.7% to 0.2%, and thus reducing the tax collected from 0.85% to 0.35%.

=== Municipal council ===
The municipal council (Kommunestyre) of Bø Municipality is made up of 19 representatives that are elected to four year terms. The tables below show the current and historical composition of the council by political party.

Bø kommunestyre 2023–2027
| Party name (in Norwegian) | Number of representatives |
|---|---|
| Labour Party (Arbeiderpartiet) | 2 |
| Progress Party (Fremskrittspartiet) | 1 |
| Conservative Party (Høyre) | 9 |
| Centre Party (Senterpartiet) | 2 |
| Liberal Party (Venstre) | 3 |
| Joint list of the Red Party (Rødt) and the Socialist Left Party (Sosialistisk Venstreparti) | 2 |
| Total number of members: | 19 |

Bø kommunestyre 2019–2023
| Party name (in Norwegian) | Number of representatives |
|---|---|
| Labour Party (Arbeiderpartiet) | 2 |
| Progress Party (Fremskrittspartiet) | 1 |
| Conservative Party (Høyre) | 11 |
| Centre Party (Senterpartiet) | 4 |
| Socialist Left Party (Sosialistisk Venstreparti) | 1 |
| Total number of members: | 19 |

Bø kommunestyre 2015–2019
| Party name (in Norwegian) | Number of representatives |
|---|---|
| Progress Party (Fremskrittspartiet) | 1 |
| Centre Party (Senterpartiet) | 2 |
| Socialist Left Party (Sosialistisk Venstreparti) | 1 |
| Liberal Party (Venstre) | 3 |
| Joint list of the Conservative Party (Høyre) and the Labour Party (Arbeiderpartiet) | 12 |
| Total number of members: | 19 |

Bø kommunestyre 2011–2015
| Party name (in Norwegian) | Number of representatives |
|---|---|
| Progress Party (Fremskrittspartiet) | 2 |
| Centre Party (Senterpartiet) | 2 |
| Socialist Left Party (Sosialistisk Venstreparti) | 1 |
| Liberal Party (Venstre) | 2 |
| Joint list of the Conservative Party (Høyre) and the Labour Party (Arbeiderpartiet) | 12 |
| Total number of members: | 19 |

Bø kommunestyre 2007–2011
| Party name (in Norwegian) | Number of representatives |
|---|---|
| Progress Party (Fremskrittspartiet) | 2 |
| Centre Party (Senterpartiet) | 6 |
| Socialist Left Party (Sosialistisk Venstreparti) | 1 |
| Liberal Party (Venstre) | 2 |
| Joint list of the Conservative Party (Høyre) and the Labour Party (Arbeiderpartiet) | 8 |
| Total number of members: | 19 |

Bø kommunestyre 2003–2007
| Party name (in Norwegian) | Number of representatives |
|---|---|
| Labour Party (Arbeiderpartiet) | 3 |
| Progress Party (Fremskrittspartiet) | 2 |
| Conservative Party (Høyre) | 3 |
| Christian Democratic Party (Kristelig Folkeparti) | 1 |
| Centre Party (Senterpartiet) | 7 |
| Socialist Left Party (Sosialistisk Venstreparti) | 2 |
| Liberal Party (Venstre) | 1 |
| Total number of members: | 19 |

Bø kommunestyre 1999–2003
| Party name (in Norwegian) | Number of representatives |
|---|---|
| Labour Party (Arbeiderpartiet) | 4 |
| Conservative Party (Høyre) | 5 |
| Christian Democratic Party (Kristelig Folkeparti) | 1 |
| Coastal Party (Kystpartiet) | 3 |
| Centre Party (Senterpartiet) | 9 |
| Socialist Left Party (Sosialistisk Venstreparti) | 1 |
| Liberal Party (Venstre) | 1 |
| Midtbygda's common list (Midtbygdas fellesliste) | 1 |
| Total number of members: | 25 |

Bø kommunestyre 1995–1999
| Party name (in Norwegian) | Number of representatives |
|---|---|
| Labour Party (Arbeiderpartiet) | 4 |
| Conservative Party (Høyre) | 4 |
| Christian Democratic Party (Kristelig Folkeparti) | 2 |
| Centre Party (Senterpartiet) | 6 |
| Socialist Left Party (Sosialistisk Venstreparti) | 2 |
| Liberal Party (Venstre) | 2 |
| Nordbygden's Common List (Nordbygdens Fellesliste) | 3 |
| Midtbygden's Common List (Midtbygdens Fellesliste) | 2 |
| Total number of members: | 25 |

Bø kommunestyre 1991–1995
| Party name (in Norwegian) | Number of representatives |
|---|---|
| Labour Party (Arbeiderpartiet) | 6 |
| Conservative Party (Høyre) | 4 |
| Christian Democratic Party (Kristelig Folkeparti) | 2 |
| Centre Party (Senterpartiet) | 2 |
| Socialist Left Party (Sosialistisk Venstreparti) | 3 |
| Liberal Party (Venstre) | 1 |
| Nordbygden's Common List (Nordbygdens Fellesliste) | 4 |
| Midtbygden's Common List (Midtbygdens Fellesliste) | 3 |
| Total number of members: | 25 |

Bø kommunestyre 1987–1991
| Party name (in Norwegian) | Number of representatives |
|---|---|
| Labour Party (Arbeiderpartiet) | 6 |
| Conservative Party (Høyre) | 4 |
| Christian Democratic Party (Kristelig Folkeparti) | 2 |
| Socialist Left Party (Sosialistisk Venstreparti) | 2 |
| Liberal Party (Venstre) | 2 |
| Nordbygden's Common List (Nordbygdens Fellesliste) | 5 |
| Midtbygden's Common List (Midtbygdens Fellesliste) | 4 |
| Total number of members: | 25 |

Bø kommunestyre 1983–1987
| Party name (in Norwegian) | Number of representatives |
|---|---|
| Labour Party (Arbeiderpartiet) | 8 |
| Conservative Party (Høyre) | 5 |
| Christian Democratic Party (Kristelig Folkeparti) | 2 |
| Centre Party (Senterpartiet) | 1 |
| Socialist Left Party (Sosialistisk Venstreparti) | 2 |
| Liberal Party (Venstre) | 1 |
| Nordbygden's Common List (Nordbygdens Fellesliste) | 4 |
| Midtbygden's Common List (Midtbygdens Fellesliste) | 2 |
| Total number of members: | 25 |

Bø kommunestyre 1979–1983
| Party name (in Norwegian) | Number of representatives |
|---|---|
| Labour Party (Arbeiderpartiet) | 6 |
| Conservative Party (Høyre) | 5 |
| Christian Democratic Party (Kristelig Folkeparti) | 2 |
| Centre Party (Senterpartiet) | 1 |
| Socialist Left Party (Sosialistisk Venstreparti) | 1 |
| Liberal Party (Venstre) | 2 |
| Nordbygden's Common List (Nordbygdens Fellesliste) | 6 |
| Midtbygden's Common List (Midtbygdens Fellesliste) | 2 |
| Total number of members: | 25 |

Bø kommunestyre 1975–1979
| Party name (in Norwegian) | Number of representatives |
|---|---|
| Labour Party (Arbeiderpartiet) | 6 |
| Conservative Party (Høyre) | 2 |
| Christian Democratic Party (Kristelig Folkeparti) | 2 |
| Centre Party (Senterpartiet) | 1 |
| Liberal Party (Venstre) | 1 |
| Nordbygden's Common List (Nordbygdens Fellesliste) | 9 |
| Midtbygden's Common List (Midtbygdens Fellesliste) | 4 |
| Total number of members: | 25 |

Bø kommunestyre 1971–1975
| Party name (in Norwegian) | Number of representatives |
|---|---|
| Labour Party (Arbeiderpartiet) | 6 |
| Conservative Party (Høyre) | 2 |
| Christian Democratic Party (Kristelig Folkeparti) | 2 |
| Centre Party (Senterpartiet) | 1 |
| Liberal Party (Venstre) | 2 |
| Local List(s) (Lokale lister) | 11 |
| Socialist common list (Venstresosialistiske felleslister) | 1 |
| Total number of members: | 25 |

Bø kommunestyre 1967–1971
| Party name (in Norwegian) | Number of representatives |
|---|---|
| Labour Party (Arbeiderpartiet) | 12 |
| Conservative Party (Høyre) | 3 |
| Christian Democratic Party (Kristelig Folkeparti) | 2 |
| Centre Party (Senterpartiet) | 1 |
| Socialist People's Party (Sosialistisk Folkeparti) | 3 |
| Liberal Party (Venstre) | 4 |
| Total number of members: | 25 |

Bø kommunestyre 1963–1967
| Party name (in Norwegian) | Number of representatives |
|---|---|
| Labour Party (Arbeiderpartiet) | 11 |
| Conservative Party (Høyre) | 4 |
| Christian Democratic Party (Kristelig Folkeparti) | 3 |
| Socialist People's Party (Sosialistisk Folkeparti) | 2 |
| Liberal Party (Venstre) | 5 |
| Total number of members: | 25 |

Bø herredsstyre 1959–1963
| Party name (in Norwegian) | Number of representatives |
|---|---|
| Labour Party (Arbeiderpartiet) | 11 |
| Conservative Party (Høyre) | 4 |
| Communist Party (Kommunistiske Parti) | 2 |
| Christian Democratic Party (Kristelig Folkeparti) | 3 |
| Liberal Party (Venstre) | 5 |
| Total number of members: | 25 |

Bø herredsstyre 1955–1959
| Party name (in Norwegian) | Number of representatives |
|---|---|
| Labour Party (Arbeiderpartiet) | 11 |
| Conservative Party (Høyre) | 3 |
| Communist Party (Kommunistiske Parti) | 2 |
| Christian Democratic Party (Kristelig Folkeparti) | 3 |
| Liberal Party (Venstre) | 6 |
| Total number of members: | 25 |

Bø herredsstyre 1951–1955
| Party name (in Norwegian) | Number of representatives |
|---|---|
| Labour Party (Arbeiderpartiet) | 11 |
| Communist Party (Kommunistiske Parti) | 2 |
| Christian Democratic Party (Kristelig Folkeparti) | 2 |
| Liberal Party (Venstre) | 7 |
| Joint List(s) of Non-Socialist Parties (Borgerlige Felleslister) | 2 |
| Total number of members: | 24 |

Bø herredsstyre 1947–1951
| Party name (in Norwegian) | Number of representatives |
|---|---|
| Labour Party (Arbeiderpartiet) | 11 |
| Communist Party (Kommunistiske Parti) | 3 |
| Christian Democratic Party (Kristelig Folkeparti) | 3 |
| Liberal Party (Venstre) | 7 |
| Total number of members: | 24 |

Bø herredsstyre 1945–1947
| Party name (in Norwegian) | Number of representatives |
|---|---|
| Labour Party (Arbeiderpartiet) | 11 |
| Communist Party (Kommunistiske Parti) | 5 |
| Christian Democratic Party (Kristelig Folkeparti) | 2 |
| Liberal Party (Venstre) | 6 |
| Total number of members: | 24 |

Bø herredsstyre 1937–1941*
| Party name (in Norwegian) | Number of representatives |
|---|---|
| Labour Party (Arbeiderpartiet) | 13 |
| Communist Party (Kommunistiske Parti) | 2 |
| Liberal Party (Venstre) | 5 |
| List of workers, fishermen, and small farmholders (Arbeidere, fiskere, småbrukere liste) | 1 |
| Joint List(s) of Non-Socialist Parties (Borgerlige Felleslister) | 3 |
| Total number of members: | 24 |
Note: Due to the German occupation of Norway during World War II, no elections were held for new municipal councils until after the war ended in 1945.

=== Mayors ===
The mayor (Norwegian: ordfører) of Bø Municipality is the political leader of the municipality and the chairperson of the municipal council. Here is a list of people who have held this position:

- 1838–1843: Nils Christian Larsen
- 1844–1849: Jakob Andreas Arntsen
- 1850–1851: Christopher Johan Lockert
- 1852–1853: Hans Døscher
- 1854–1857: Niels Clausen
- 1858–1860: Fredrik Nikolai Jensen
- 1861–1862: John Røst Schjelderup
- 1863–1864: John Olsen
- 1865–1866: C.F. Daae
- 1867–1870: Niels Clausen
- 1871–1881: Martin Rüsing
- 1881–1888: John Olsen
- 1889–1910: William Martinussen (V)
- 1911–1916: Arnfinn Røgh Jakobsen Røkenes
- 1917–1934: William Martinussen (V)
- 1935–1940: Rolv Straume (Ap)
- 1940–1941: Sverre Sannes
- 1941–1944: Jack Lihaug
- 1945–1945: Jens Olai Steffensen (Ap)
- 1945–1947: Martin Jensen
- 1947–1948: Arnulf Pedersen
- 1948–1951: Klaus Myrland
- 1951–1965: Konrad Aksel Johnsen (Ap)
- 1965–1971: Reidar Hansen (Ap)
- 1971–1975: Ludvik Martinussen (Ap)
- 1975–1979: Ovald Lockert (LL)
- 1979–1984: Kåre Johnsen (H)
- 1984–1985: Torbjørn Oluf Andersen (Ap)
- 1987–1995: Arne Fredrik Andersen (H)
- 1995–2007: Viggo Kristoffer Johnsen (Sp)
- 2007–present: Sture Pedersen (H)

== Geography ==
The municipality of Bø lies on the island of Langøya and many small surrounding islets including Litløya and Gaukværøy. The Norwegian County Road 820 is the only road that connects Bø to the rest of Norway via the 1,612-metre (5,289 ft) long Ryggedal Tunnel, connecting Bø to the neighboring Øksnes Municipality and Sortland Municipality. The highest point in the municipality is the 694.61-metre (2,278.9 ft) tall mountain Burnestinden.

=== Climate ===
Bø has a subpolar oceanic climate (Köppen Cfc), and is close to a temperate oceanic climate. Bø is the northernmost location in the world with all monthly means above 0 °C (32 °F). The current weather station is on the south coast of the island. An earlier weather station was located more inland on the island in a flat marshy area, and had recorded up to 30 °C (86 °F) in July and down to −20 °C (−4 °F) in February.

Climate data for Bø i Vesterålen 1991–2020 (8 m, extremes 2003–2025)
| Month | Jan | Feb | Mar | Apr | May | Jun | Jul | Aug | Sep | Oct | Nov | Dec | Year |
|---|---|---|---|---|---|---|---|---|---|---|---|---|---|
| Record high °C (°F) | 9 (48) | 9 (48) | 10 (50) | 17.2 (63.0) | 22.4 (72.3) | 27.6 (81.7) | 28.8 (83.8) | 28.5 (83.3) | 20.6 (69.1) | 16.6 (61.9) | 13 (55) | 9.5 (49.1) | 28.8 (83.8) |
| Daily mean °C (°F) | 0.8 (33.4) | 0.1 (32.2) | 0.7 (33.3) | 3 (37) | 6.5 (43.7) | 9.8 (49.6) | 12.5 (54.5) | 12.3 (54.1) | 9.7 (49.5) | 5.8 (42.4) | 3.5 (38.3) | 1.8 (35.2) | 5.5 (41.9) |
| Record low °C (°F) | −11.4 (11.5) | −11.6 (11.1) | −9.8 (14.4) | −6.4 (20.5) | −2.7 (27.1) | 0.9 (33.6) | 4.7 (40.5) | 2.8 (37.0) | 0.7 (33.3) | −4.3 (24.3) | −7.7 (18.1) | −9.2 (15.4) | −11.6 (11.1) |
| Average precipitation mm (inches) | 83 (3.3) | 71 (2.8) | 73 (2.9) | 53 (2.1) | 47 (1.9) | 41 (1.6) | 49 (1.9) | 57 (2.2) | 84 (3.3) | 99 (3.9) | 96 (3.8) | 99 (3.9) | 852 (33.6) |
Source: Norwegian Meteorological Institute

Climate data for Bø i Vesterålen 1961–1990
| Month | Jan | Feb | Mar | Apr | May | Jun | Jul | Aug | Sep | Oct | Nov | Dec | Year |
|---|---|---|---|---|---|---|---|---|---|---|---|---|---|
| Mean daily maximum °C (°F) | 0.8 (33.4) | 0.6 (33.1) | 1.6 (34.9) | 4.2 (39.6) | 9.2 (48.6) | 12.7 (54.9) | 15.2 (59.4) | 14.7 (58.5) | 10.8 (51.4) | 6.9 (44.4) | 3.4 (38.1) | 1.5 (34.7) | 6.8 (44.2) |
| Daily mean °C (°F) | −1.4 (29.5) | −1.5 (29.3) | −0.6 (30.9) | 1.9 (35.4) | 6.4 (43.5) | 9.7 (49.5) | 12.1 (53.8) | 11.9 (53.4) | 8.3 (46.9) | 4.8 (40.6) | 1.4 (34.5) | −0.8 (30.6) | 4.4 (39.9) |
| Mean daily minimum °C (°F) | −4.6 (23.7) | −4.7 (23.5) | −3.6 (25.5) | −0.9 (30.4) | 3.0 (37.4) | 6.6 (43.9) | 8.9 (48.0) | 8.5 (47.3) | 5.5 (41.9) | 2.2 (36.0) | −1.4 (29.5) | −3.8 (25.2) | 1.3 (34.3) |
| Average precipitation mm (inches) | 88 (3.5) | 81 (3.2) | 70 (2.8) | 63 (2.5) | 48 (1.9) | 56 (2.2) | 73 (2.9) | 74 (2.9) | 110 (4.3) | 144 (5.7) | 103 (4.1) | 107 (4.2) | 1,017 (40.0) |
| Average precipitation days (≥ 1 mm) | 15.4 | 13.8 | 13.2 | 12.7 | 10.3 | 10.5 | 12.7 | 11.6 | 16.5 | 18.8 | 17.2 | 17.8 | 170.3 |
Source: Norwegian Meteorological Institute

== Attractions ==
=== Man from the Sea ===
Looking out to sea from a rise above Vinje in the village of Bø stands the 'Man from the Sea', a 4.3-metre (14 ft) high figure of a man made from cast iron. The man is holding a crystal in his hands like a sacrifice to the sea. In the winter light, the crystal turns blue. The man stands with his back to the village of Bø, and looks out over the craggy archipelago towards the distinctive silhouette of Gaukværøya island.

== Notable people ==
- Regine Normann (1867 in Bø – 1939), a teacher, novelist, and story writer
- Ketil Vea (1932 in Bø – 2015), a composer and pedagogue
- Grethe Gynnild Johnsen (born 1959 in Bø), a journalist and director of all regional offices for NRK
- Bjørn Dæhlie (born 1967), a champion skier who intends to move to Bø for tax reasons
