= Moskenes =

Moskenes may refer to:

== Places ==
- Moskenes Municipality, a municipality in Nordland county, Norway
- Moskenes (village), a village within Moskenes Municipality in Nordland county, Norway
- Moskenes Church, a church in Moskenes Municipality in Nordland county, Norway
- Moskenes Island, or Moskenesøya, an island in Moskenes Municipality in Nordland county, Norway
- Moskeneset, Finnmark, a small peninsula in Lebesby Municipality in Finnmark county, Norway
- Moskeneset, Nordland, a small peninsula in Gildeskål Municipality in Nordland county, Norway

== Other ==
- Moskenes, the plural of moskene, a class of synthetic aroma compounds to emulate the scent of animal musk
