= Glåpen Lighthouse =

Coastal lighthouse in Moskenes, Norway

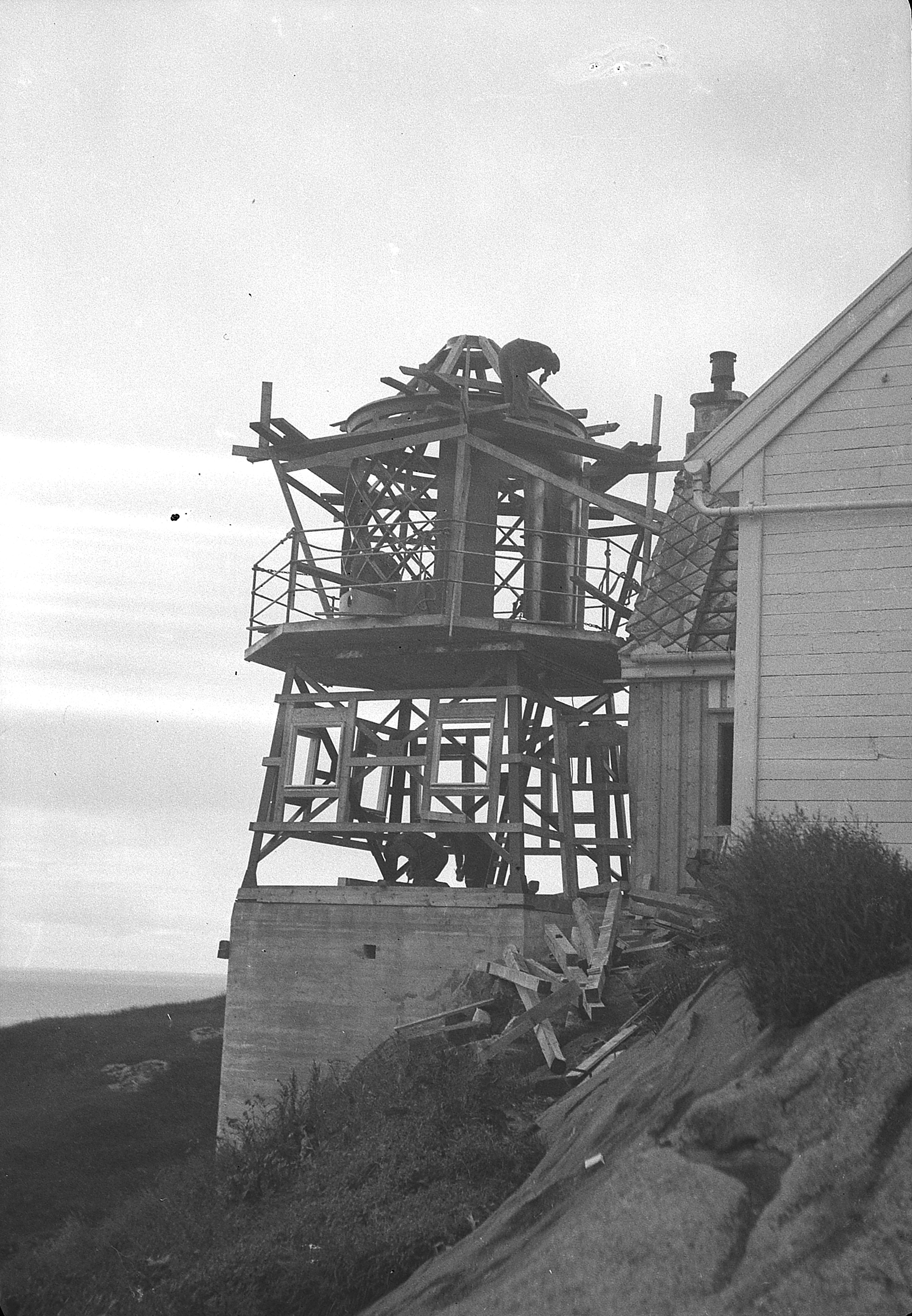
- Location: Moskenesøya, Nordland, Moskenes Municipality, Norway
- Coordinates: 67°53′14″N 13°02′10″E

Tower
- Constructed: 1857
- Construction: wood
- Height: 7 m (23 ft)
- Shape: square
- Markings: White (tower), red (lantern)

Light
- Deactivated: 1985
- Modern light
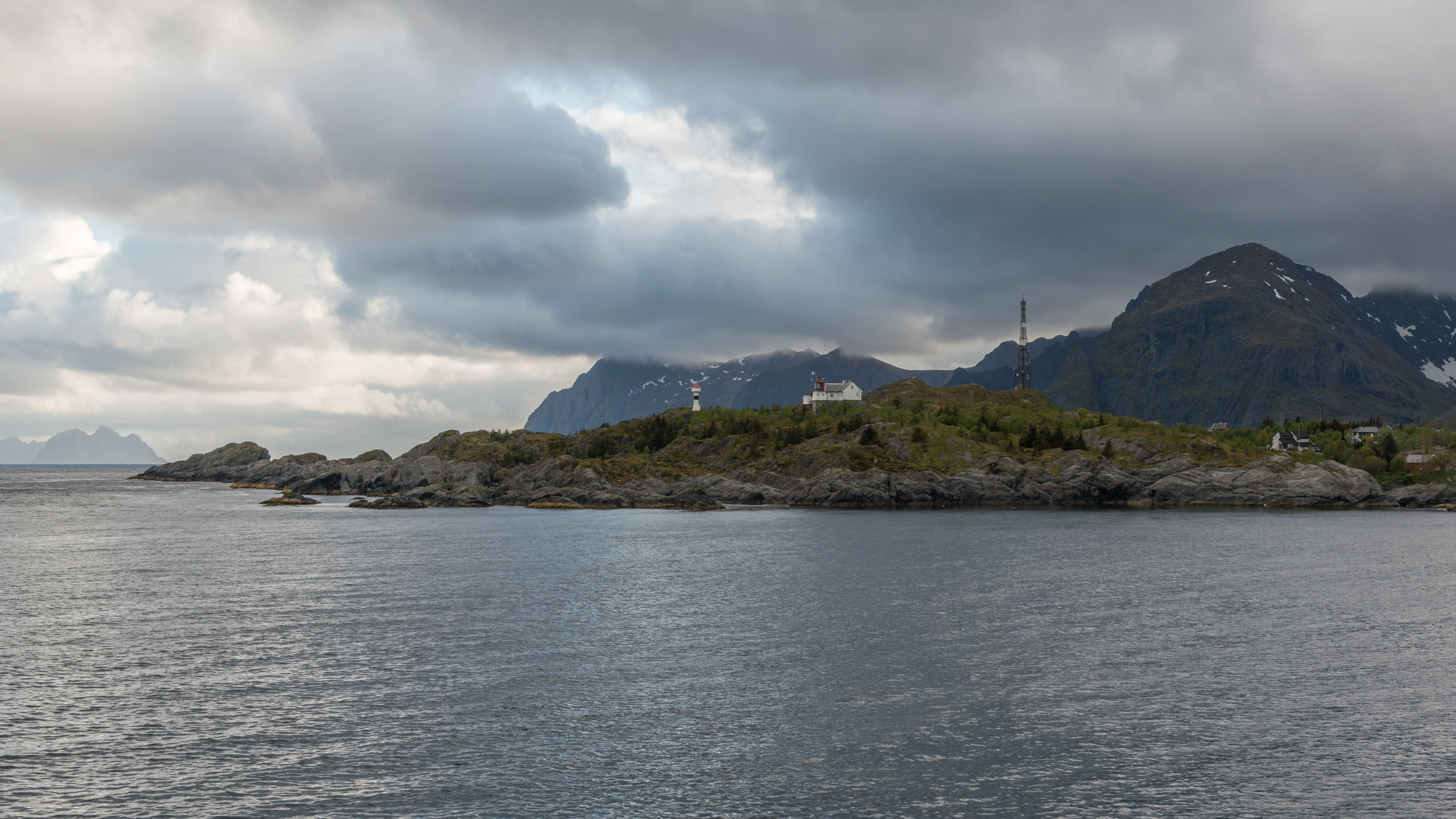
- Constructed: 1985
- Construction: concrete
- Height: 10 m (33 ft)
- Shape: cylinder
- Markings: White (tower), black (stripe), red (roof)
- First lit: 1985
- Focal height: 44.2 m (145 ft)
- Range: 11.05 nmi (20.46 km; 12.72 mi) (white), 8.6 nmi (15.9 km; 9.9 mi) (red)
- Characteristic: Oc WR 6s

Glåpen Lighthouse (Norwegian: Glåpen fyr) is a coastal lighthouse in Moskenes Municipality in Nordland county, Norway. The lighthouse sits on the southeastern shore of the island of Moskenesøya, just south of the village of Sørvågen on the northern coast of the Vestfjorden.

== History ==
The Glåpen Lighthouse was first established in 1857. The 7-metre (23 ft) tall square, wooden tower is attached to a lighthouse keeper's house. The tower is white with a red top. In 1985, the main lighthouse was closed and replaced by a small automated light, about 50 metres (160 ft) to the south of the old lighthouse building.

The present light sits on top of a 10-metre (33 ft) tall on top of a concrete pillar. The occulting light flashes red or white (depending on the direction) once every six seconds. The light sits at an elevation of 44.2 metres (145 ft) above sea level and it can be seen for up to 11.05 nautical miles (20.46 km; 12.72 mi). The tower is painted white with one black horizontal band and the roof on the light is red.

== See also ==
- Lighthouses in Norway
- List of lighthouses in Norway
