= Reine, Norway =

Village in Moskenes Municipality, Norway

Reine
- Village
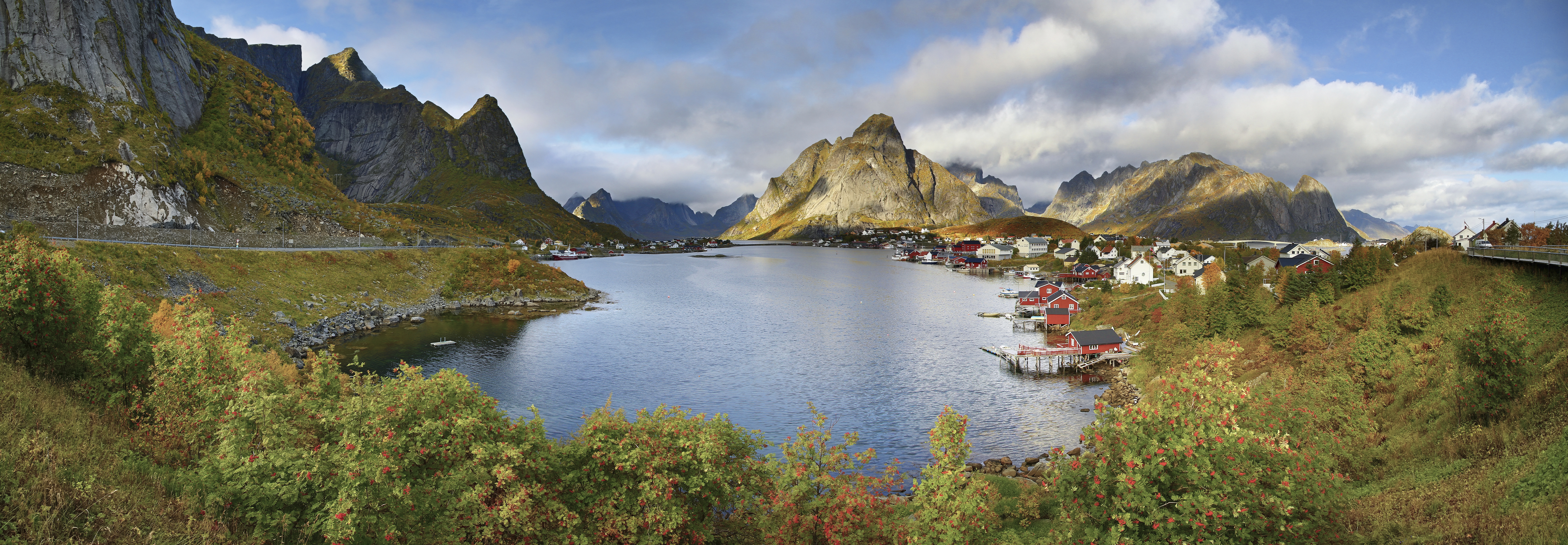
- View of the village
- Interactive map of Reine
- Location within Nordland Location within Norway
- Coordinates: 67.9324°N 13.0887°E
- Country: Norway
- Region: Northern Norway
- County: Nordland
- District: Lofoten
- Municipality: Moskenes Municipality

Area
  - Total: 0.28 km^{2} (0.11 sq mi)
- Elevation: 10 m (33 ft)

Population (2023)
  - Total: 297
  - Density: 1,061/km^{2} (2,750/sq mi)
- Time zone: UTC+01:00 (CET)
  - Summer (DST): UTC+02:00 (CEST)
- Post Code: 8390 Reine

Reine is the administrative centre of Moskenes Municipality in Nordland county, Norway. The fishing village is located on the island of Moskenesøya in the Lofoten archipelago, above the Arctic Circle, about 300 kilometres (190 mi) southwest of the city of Tromsø. Reine Church is located in the village.

The 0.28-square-kilometre (69-acre) village has a population (2023) of 297 and a population density of 1,061 inhabitants per square kilometre (2,750/sq mi).

== Overview ==
Reine has been a trading post since 1743. It was also a centre for the local fishing industry with a fleet of boats and facilities for fish processing and marketing. There was also a little light industry. In December 1941, the Germans burnt part of Reine in reprisal for a raid on the Lofoten Islands by British troops. Today, tourism is important, and despite its remote location, many thousands of people visit annually. The village is situated on a promontory just off the European route E10 highway, which passes through the village. Reine is located immediately to the south of Sakrisoya and Hamnøya.

Allers, the largest weekly magazine in Norway, selected Reine as the most beautiful village in Norway in the late 1970s. A photograph over Reine from the mountain Reinebringen (altitude 448 metres (1,470 ft)) has been used for the front page of several tourist brochures and books. In 1999, the painter Ingo Kühl set up a temporary studio in a rorbu and painted the view over the harbor to the mountain range.

In January 2015, Reine was the site from which Coca-Cola launched Coca-Cola life in Norway, referred to by the company as "our smallest launch yet". More than half the town's residents (around 200 out of 307) attended this open-air event despite being mid-winter.

In 2016–2019, a stone staircase was built up to Reinebringen, which made the mountain (previously considered steep, muddy, and difficult to climb) easily accessible.

== Gallery ==
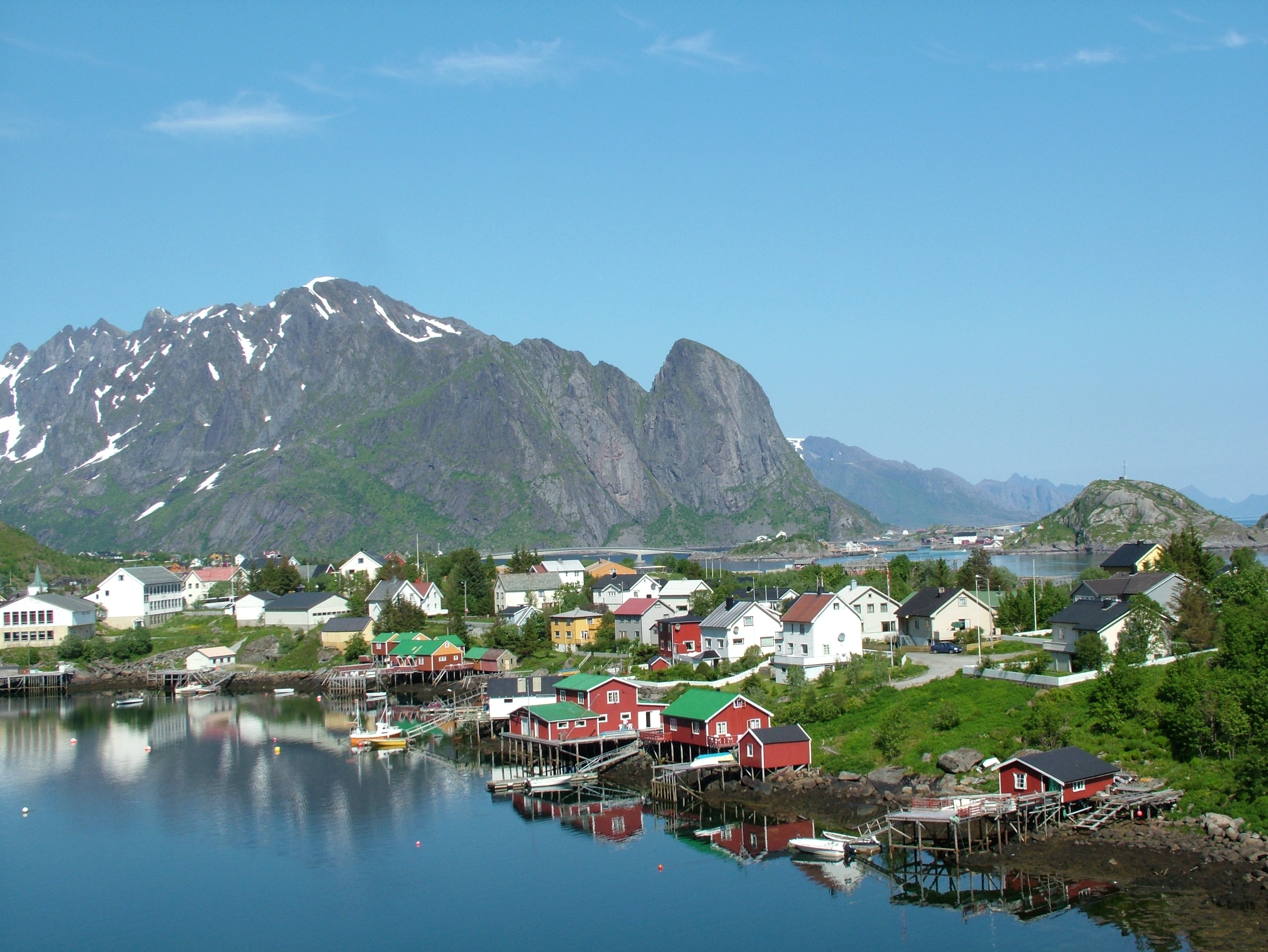
Reine in 2005

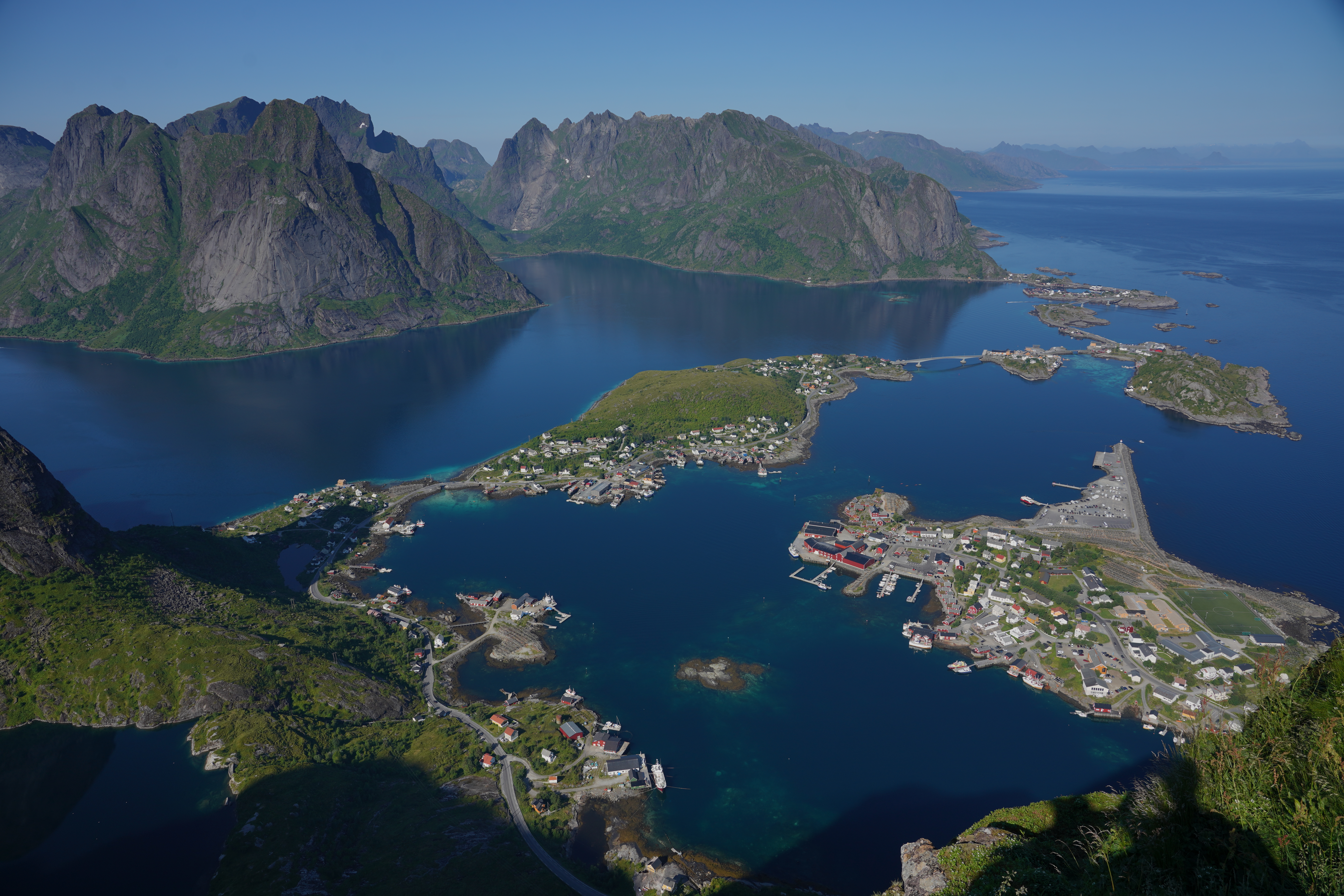
Reine seen from Reinebringen

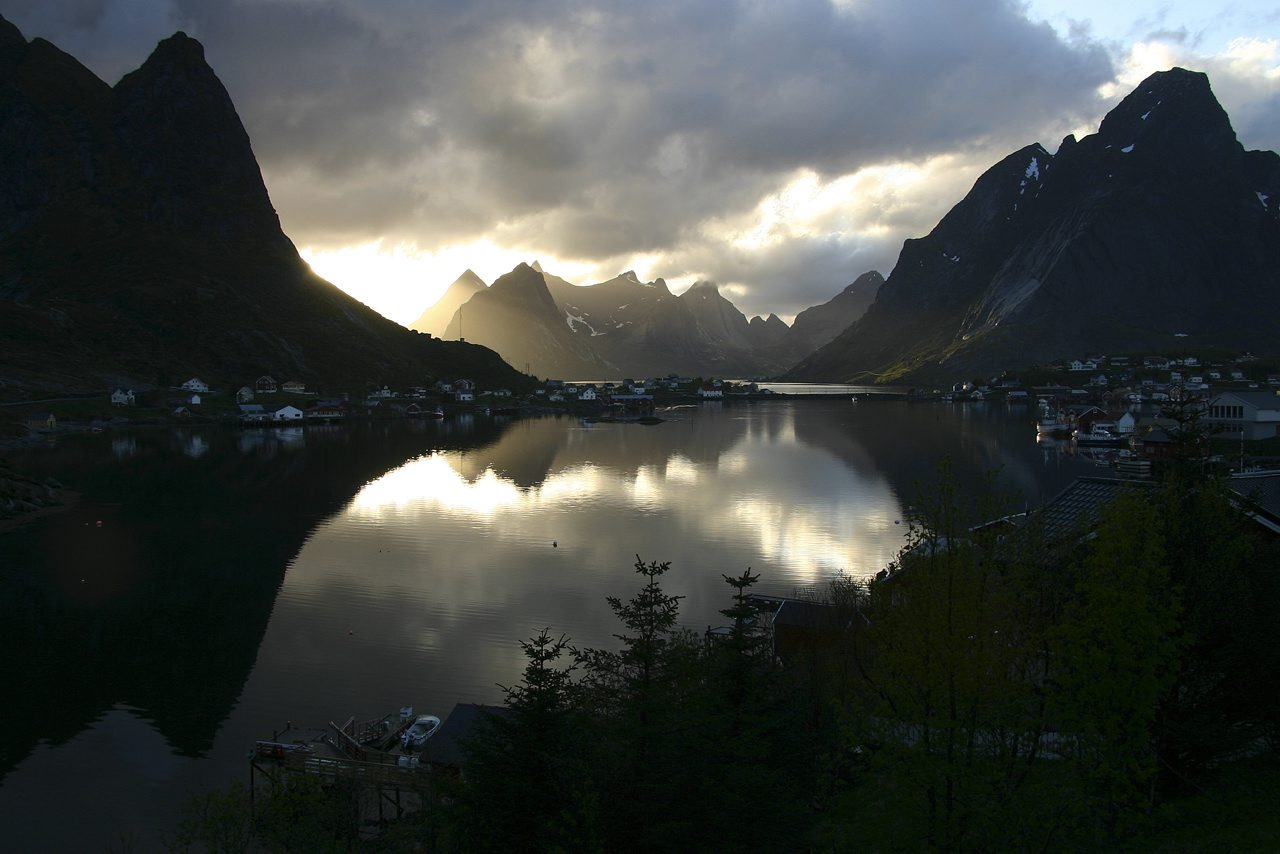
Reine at night (midnight sun)

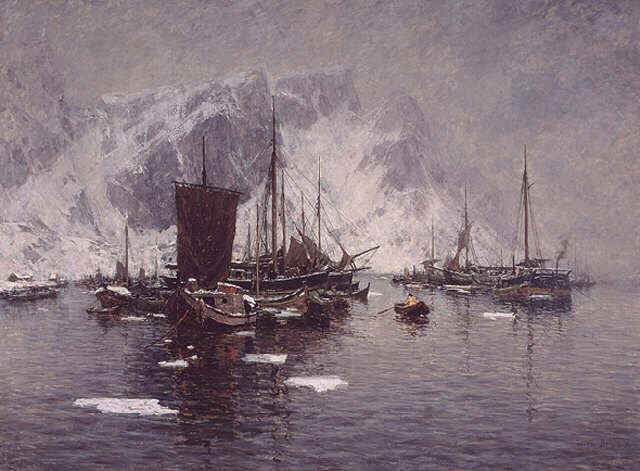
The fishing fleet at Reine, Gunnar Berg (1863–93)

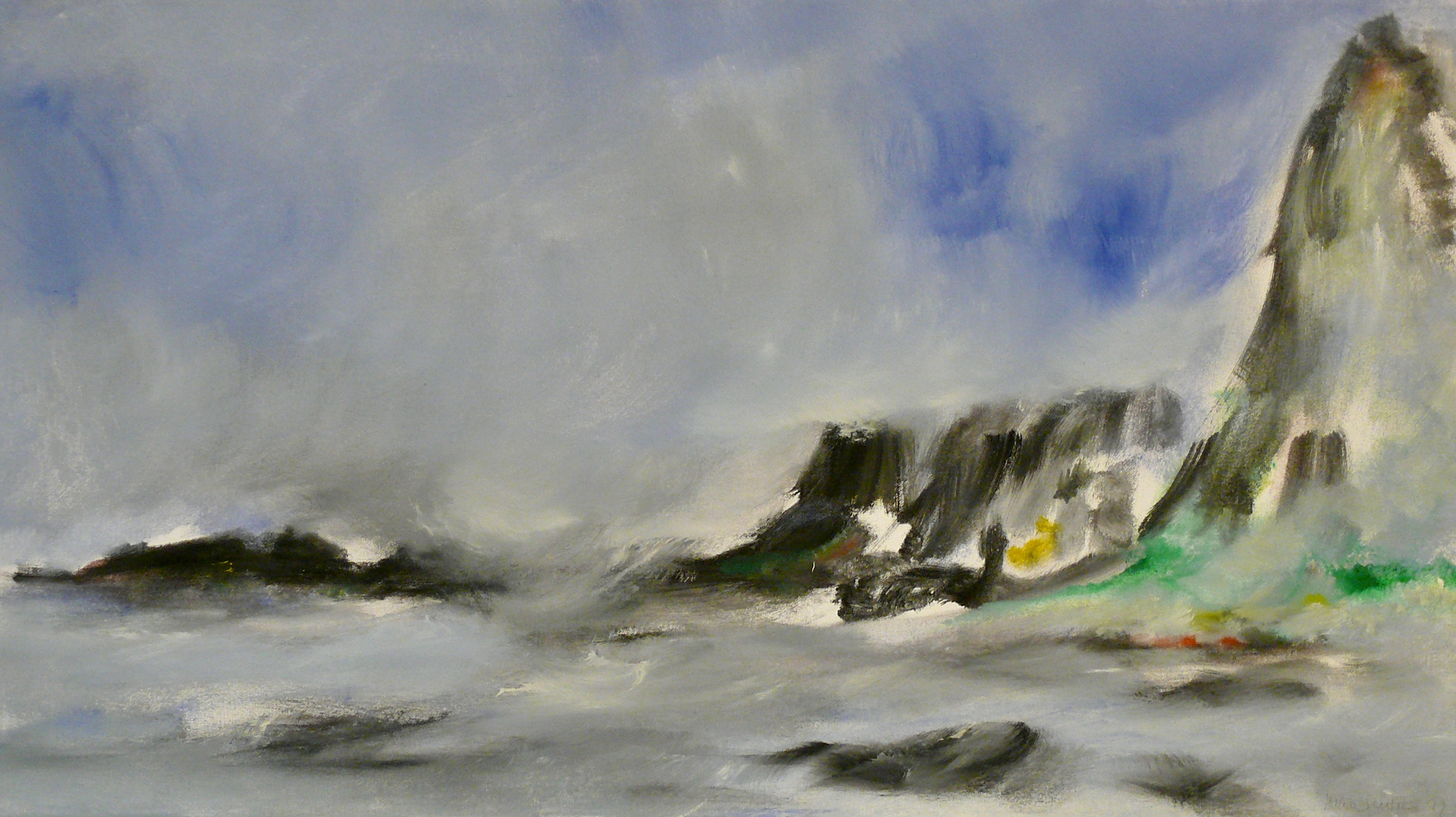
Moskstraumen I, Ingo Kühl (* 1953)

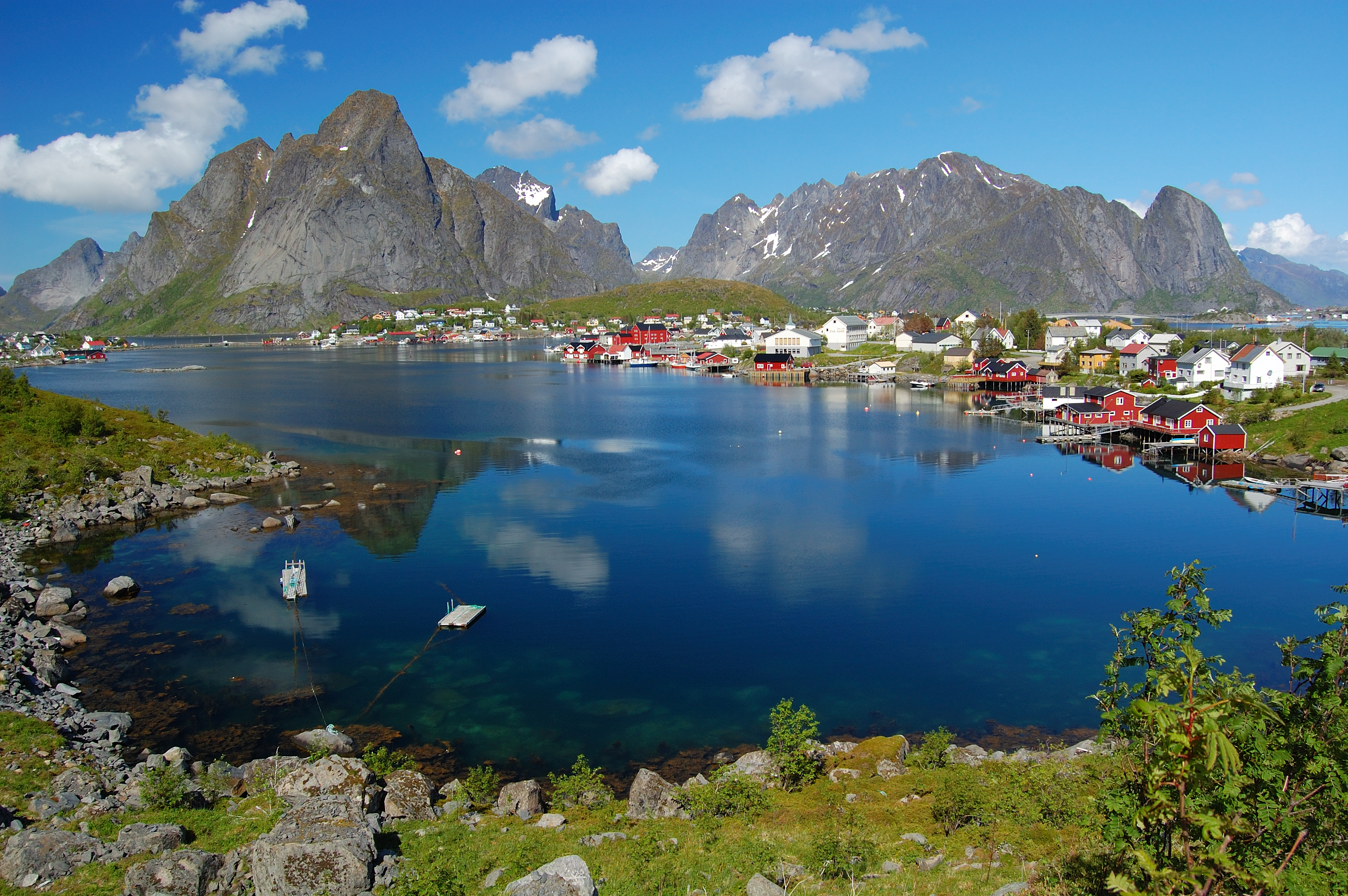
View of Reine

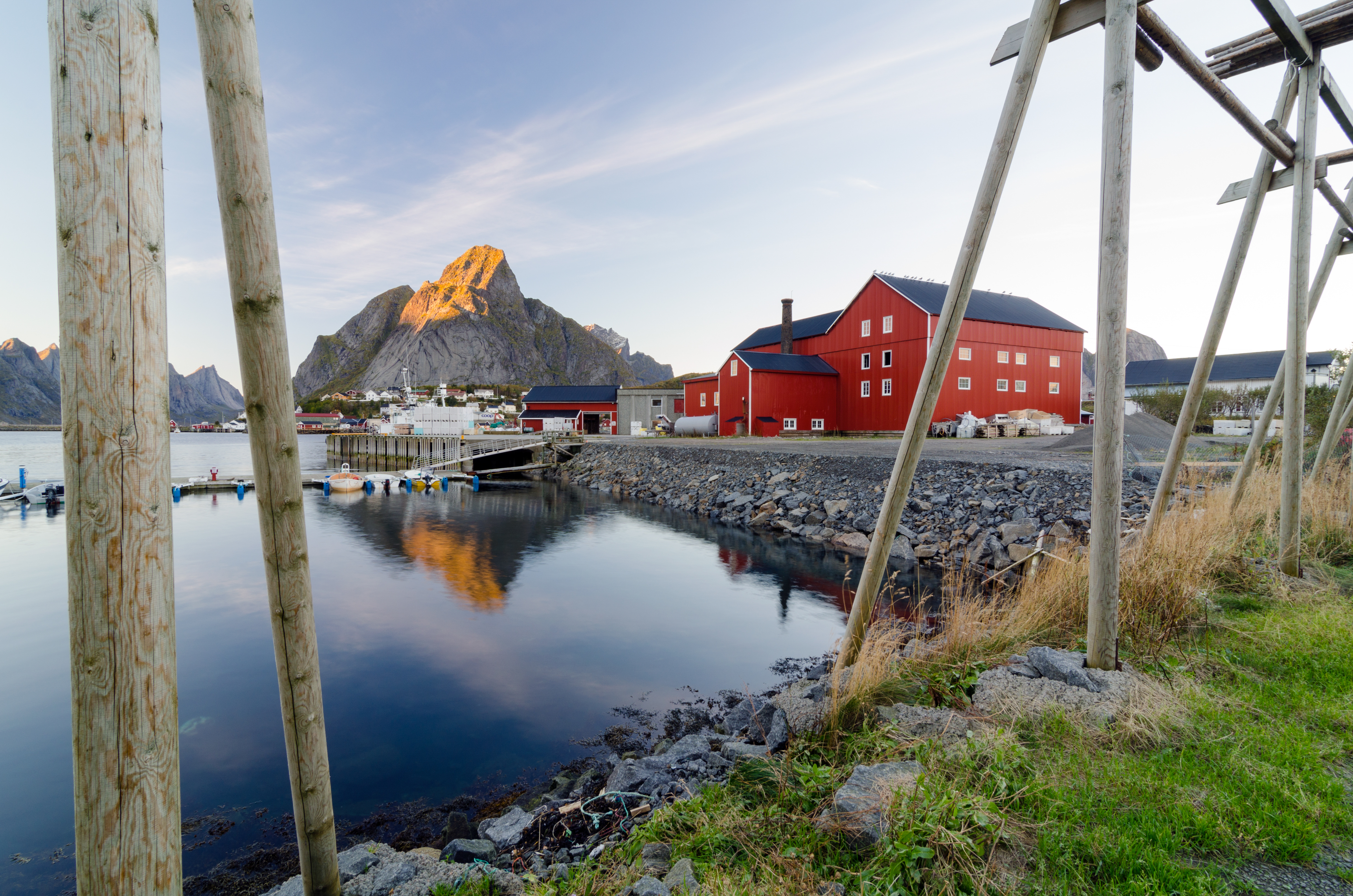
Reine village shore with the fish drying racks

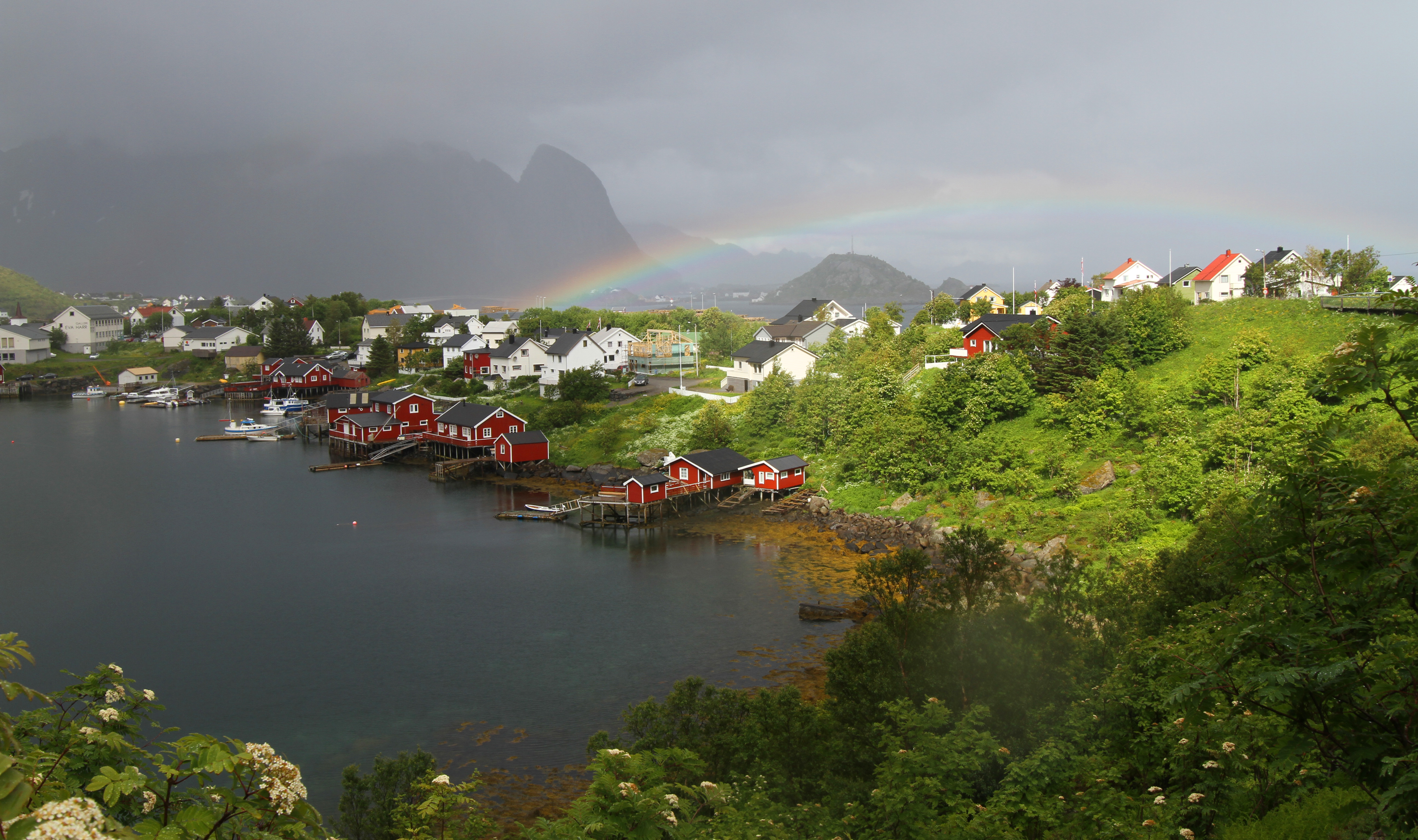
Reine with rainbow

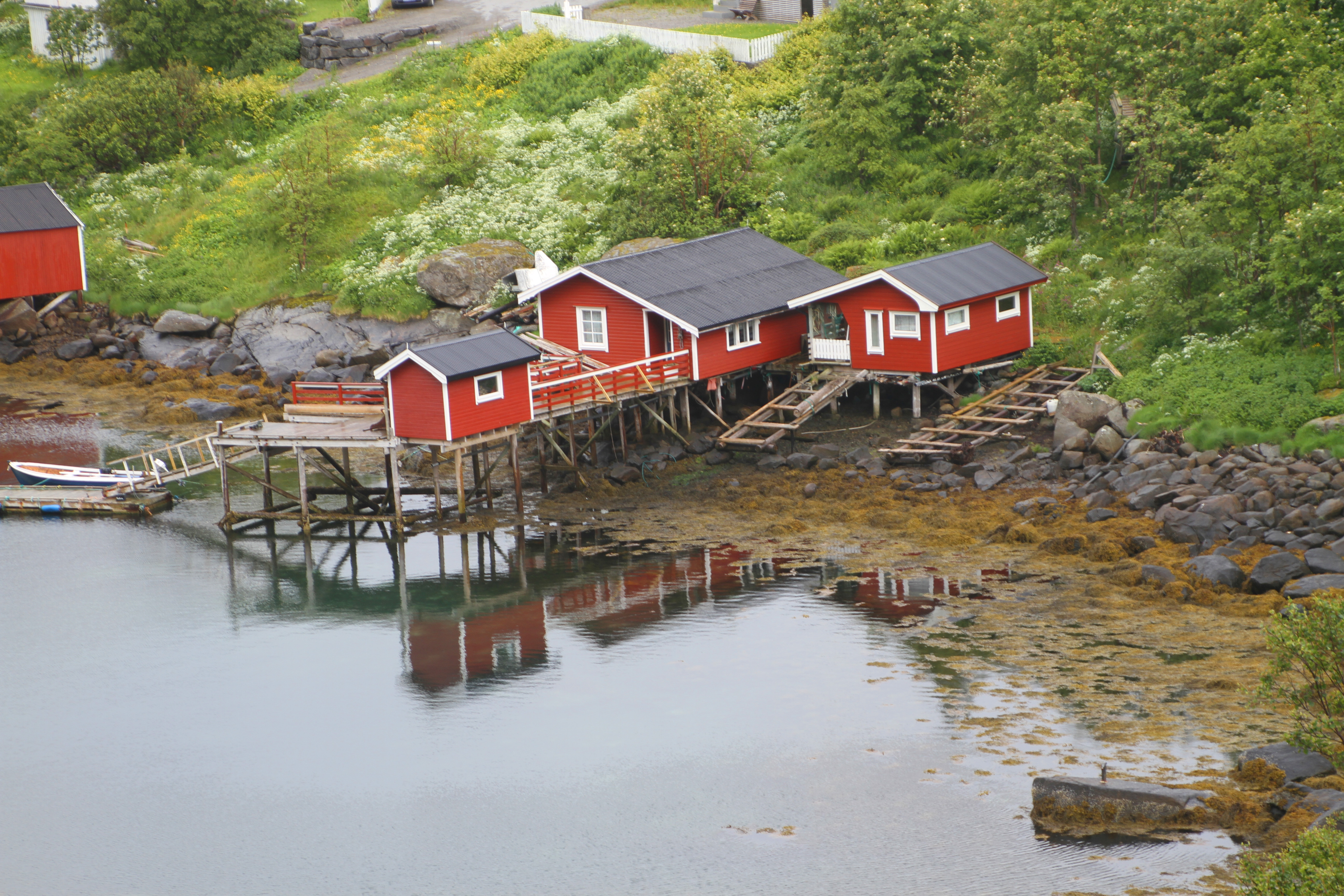
Fishermen's boathouse

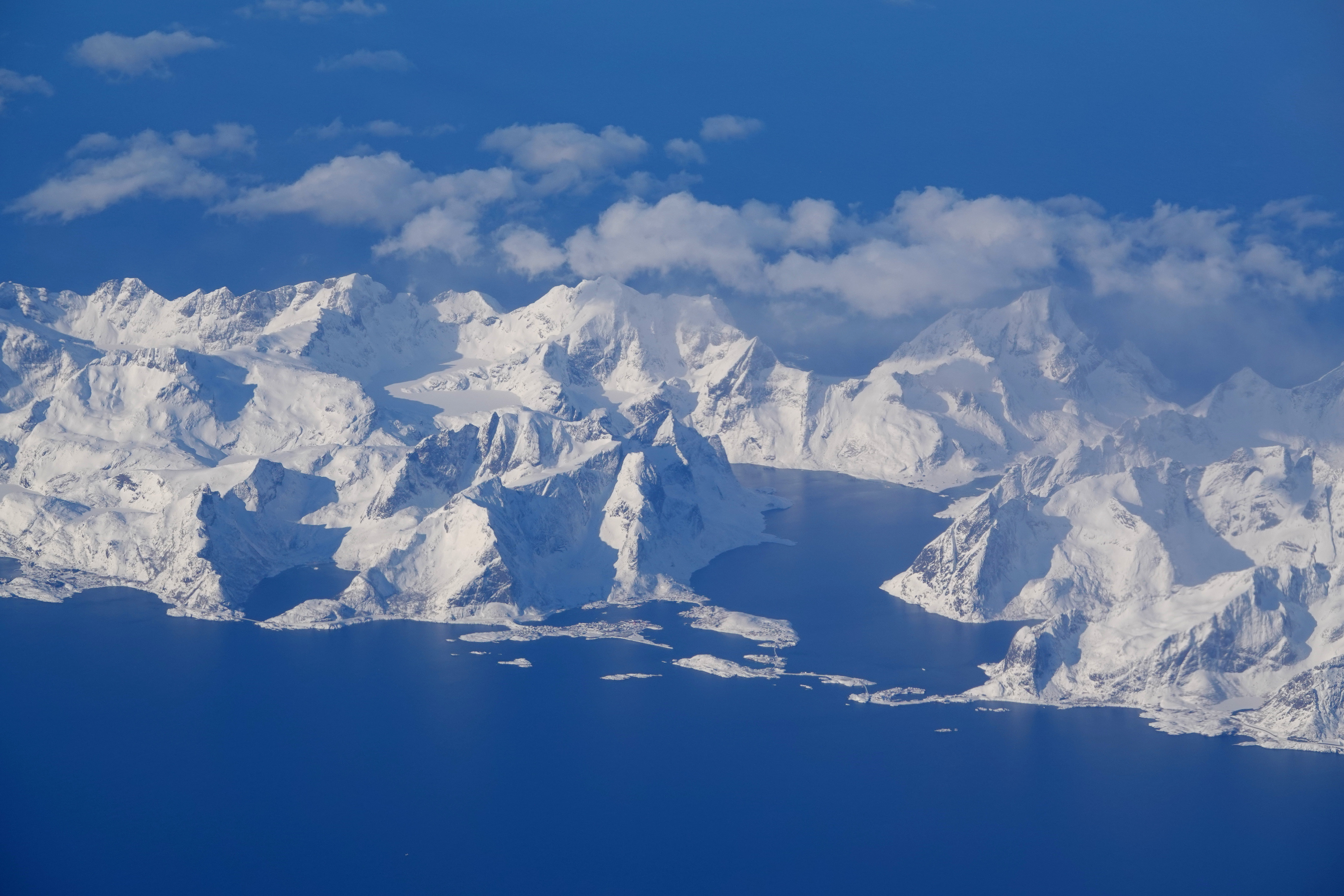
Reine and surroundings seen from the south

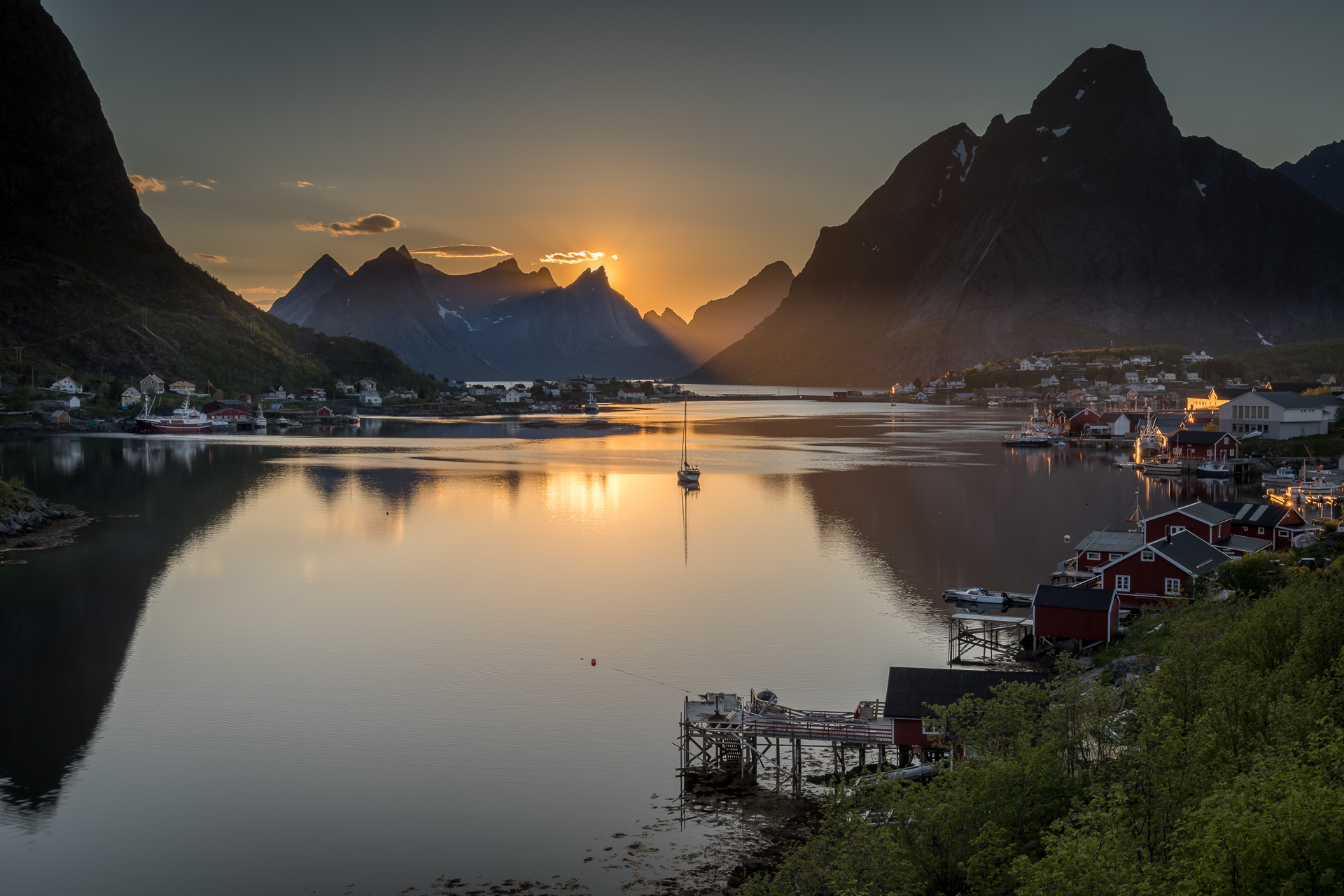
View over Kjerkefjorden from Reine in Lofoten, Norway.

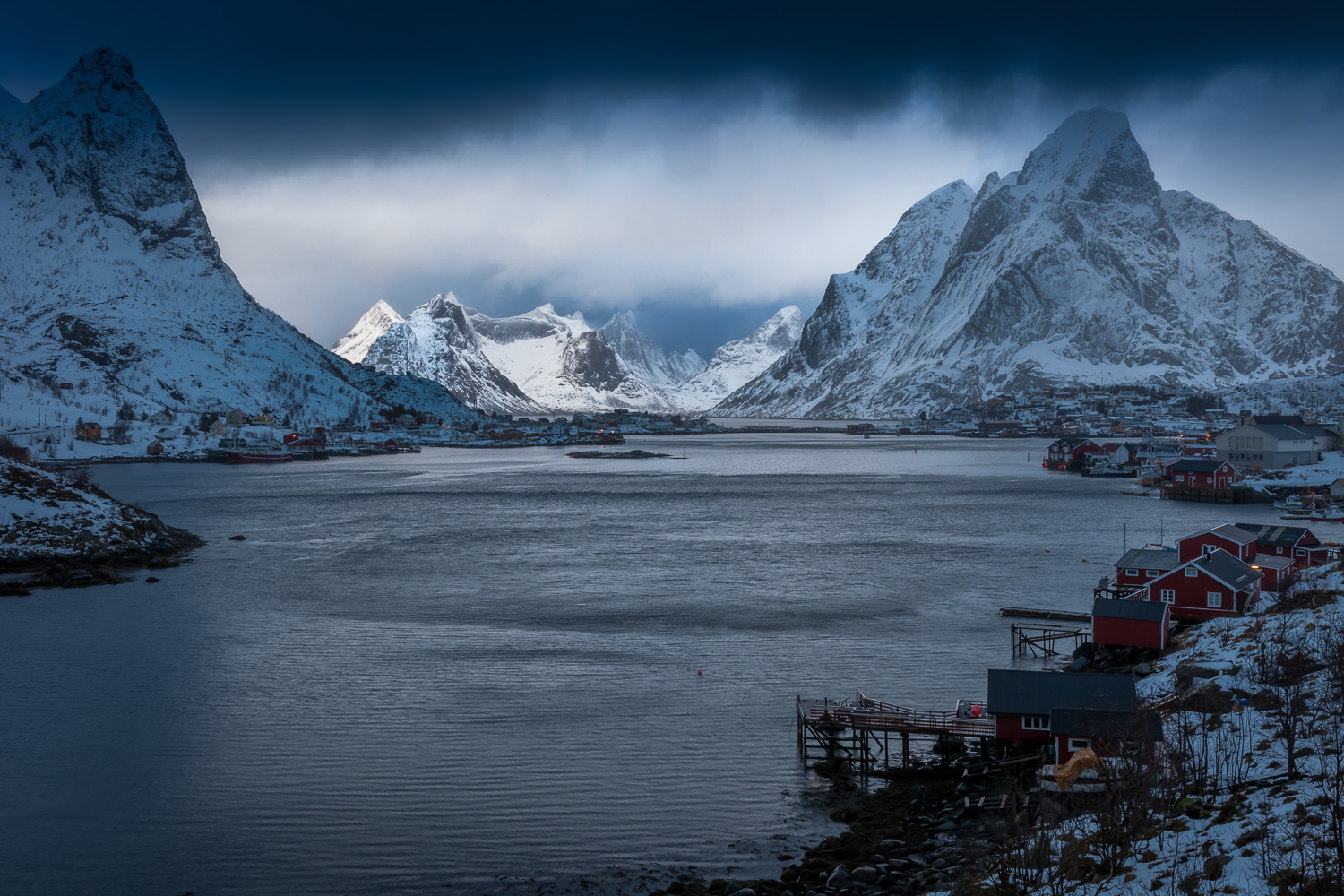
Reine in Lofoten, with snow-covered mountains around the village.
