= Rolf Bendiksen =

Norwegian politician (born 1938)

Rolf Bendiksen (born 12 April 1938 in Moskenes) is a Norwegian politician of the Norwegian Labour Party (Ap). He was a representative in the Storting for Nordland from 1989.

He was a representative from 1985 – 1989.

Bendiksen was mayor of Moskenes Municipality from 1983–1987.

== Stortings committees ==
- 1989–1993 in the sea and fisheries committee
- 1985–1989 in the sea and fisheries committee
