= Hamnøya =

Village in Moskenes Municipality, Norway

Hamnøya Hamnøy
- Village
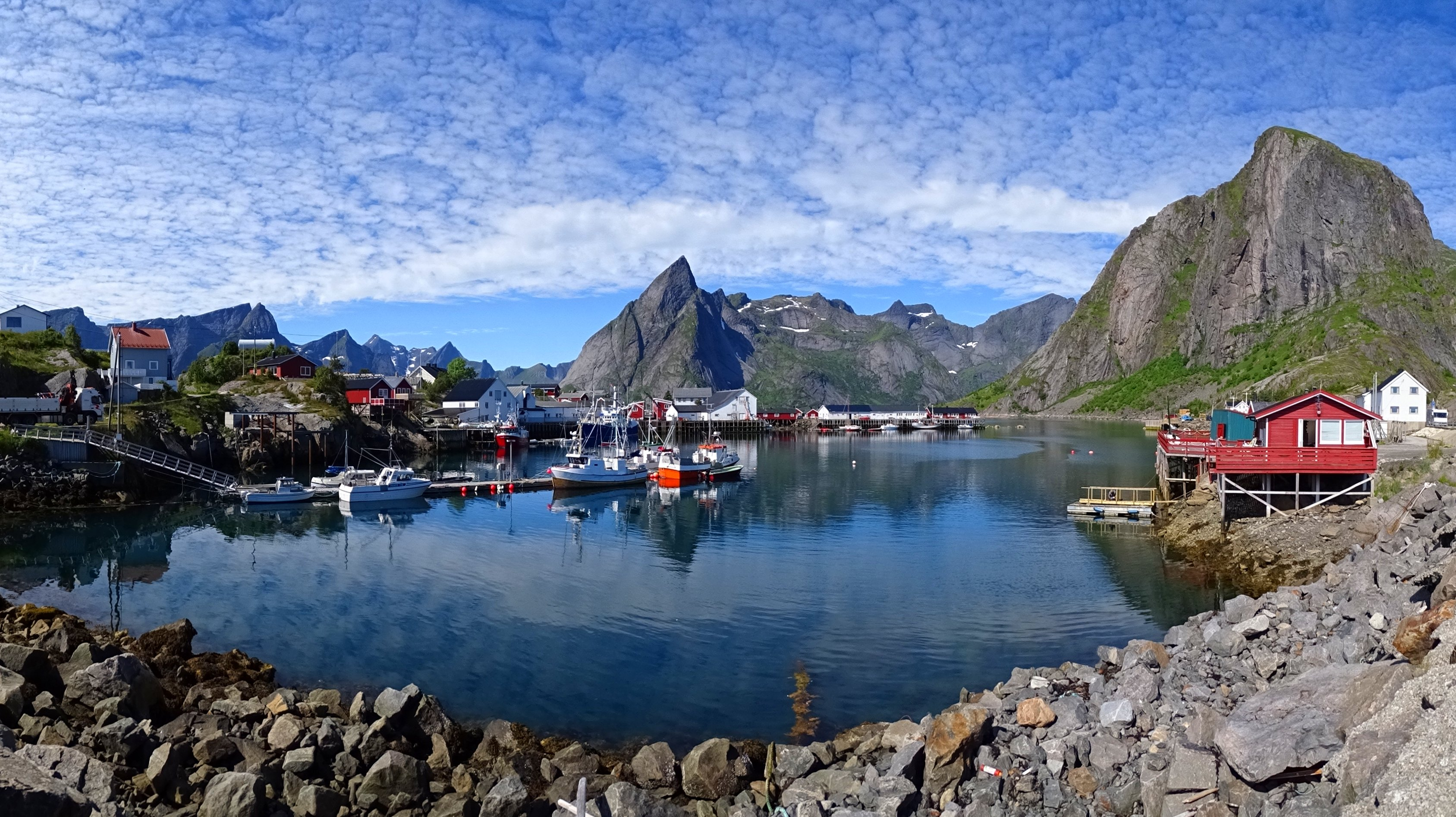
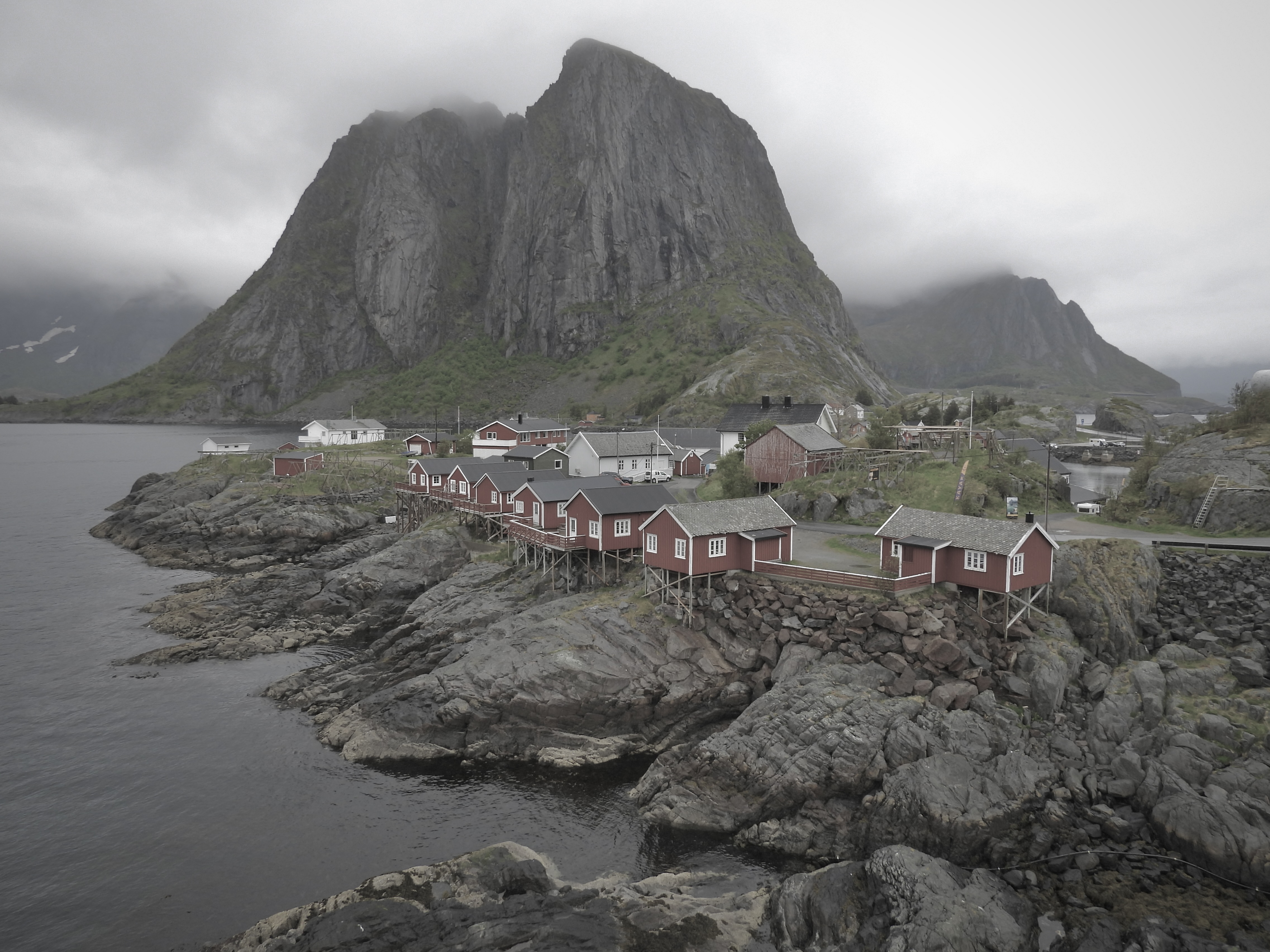
- View of the village Festhaeltinden (Festvågtind) rises in the fog beyond the fishing village of Hamnøy in the Lofoten Islands.
- Interactive map of Hamnøya
- Location within Nordland Location within Norway
- Coordinates: 67.9458°N 13.1330°E
- Country: Norway
- Region: Northern Norway
- County: Nordland
- District: Lofoten
- Municipality: Moskenes Municipality
- Elevation: 9 m (30 ft)
- Time zone: UTC+01:00 (CET)
  - Summer (DST): UTC+02:00 (CEST)
- Post Code: 8390 Reine

Hamnøya is a small fishing village in Moskenes Municipality in Nordland county, Norway. It is located on a small peninsula on the eastern side of the island of Moskenesøya, about 1.5 kilometres (0.93 mi) northeast of the village of Reine, along the Vestfjorden. Hamnøya was previously connected to Reine by ferry, but this was replaced by bridges on the European route E10 highway as part of the Lofoten Mainland Connection.

== Gallery ==
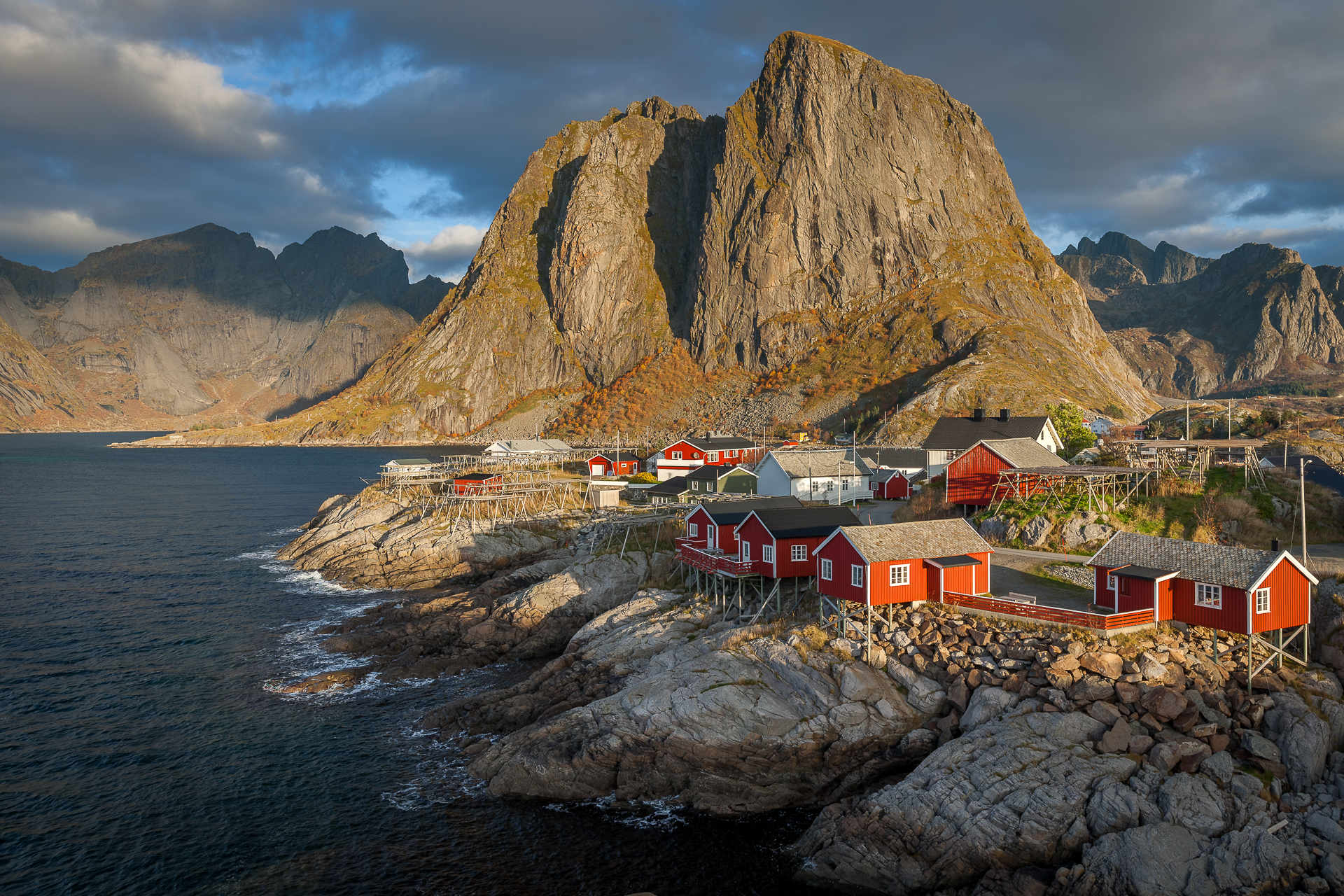
Hamnøy near Reine in Lofoten, with red rorbu cabins and steep coastal mountains.

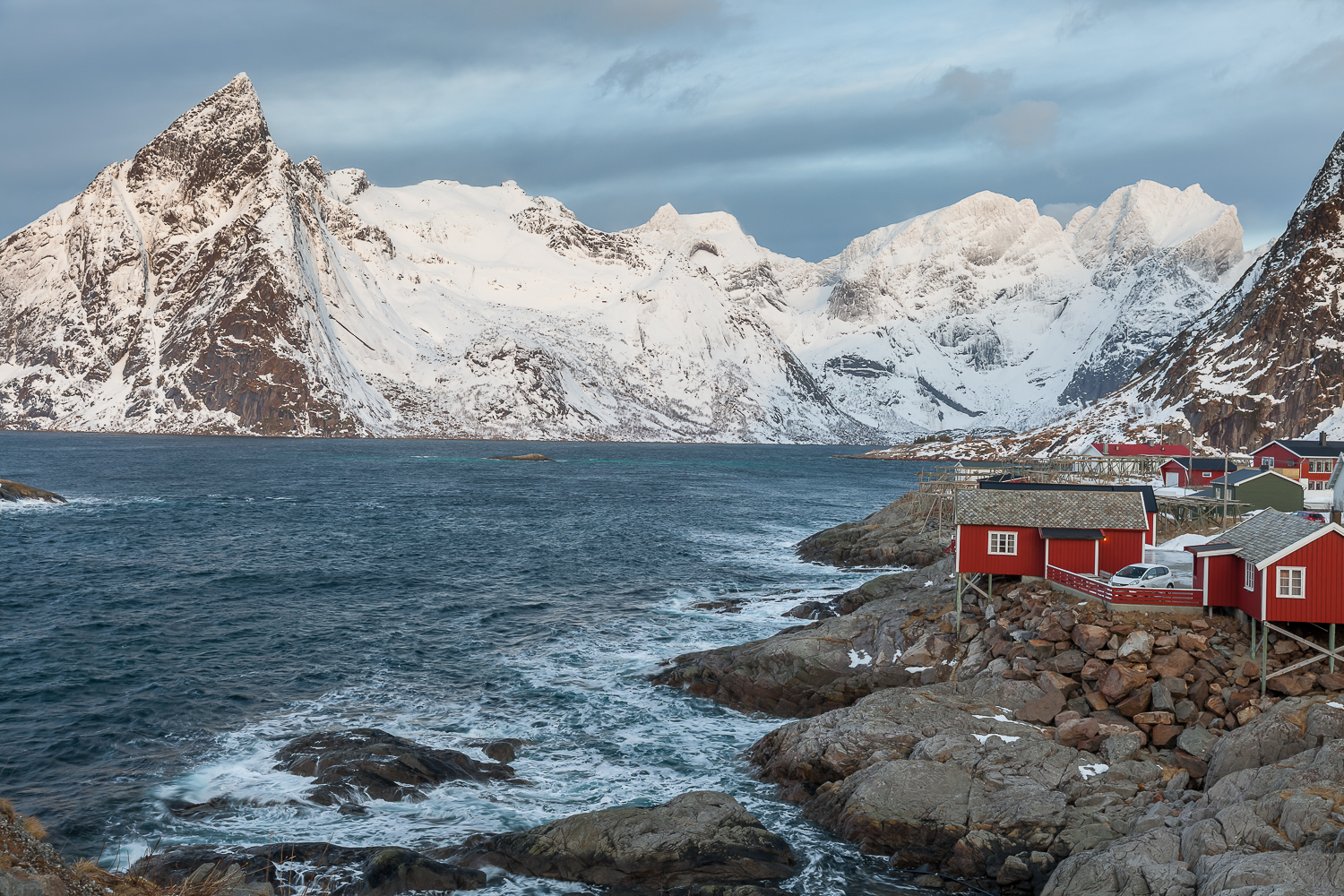
Hamnøy near Reine in Lofoten, with red rorbu cabins and snow-covered mountains.
