= Rolv Thesen =

Norwegian poet, literary researcher and literary critic

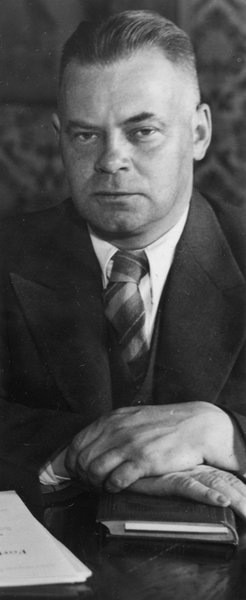
Rolv Thesen, c. 1938

Rolv Thesen (14 July 1896 – 13 September 1966) was a Norwegian poet, literary researcher and literary critic.

== Biography ==
Thesen was born in Moskenes Municipality on 14 July 1896. Among his works is a three-volume biography on Arne Garborg, of which the first volume contained his doctoral thesis. He also wrote a biography on Olav Duun, and the monography Diktaren og bygda. He was literary critic for the newspaper Arbeiderbladet from 1928. He was member of the literary council of the Norwegian Authors' Union from 1937 to 1963, and served as board member of Det Norske Teatret from 1940 to 1949.
