= Reine Church =

- Reine kirke
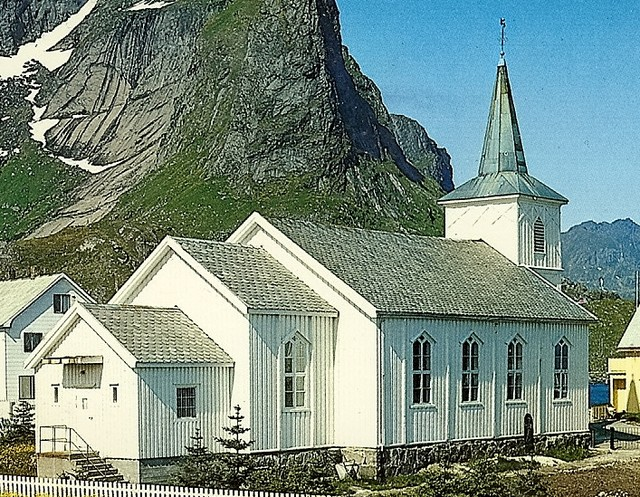
- View of the church
- Reine Church
- 67.93361841°N 13.08833510°E
- Location: Moskenes, Nordland
- Country: Norway
- Denomination: Church of Norway
- Churchmanship: Evangelical Lutheran

History
- Former name: Reine kapell
- Status: Parish church
- Founded: 1890
- Consecrated: 9 January 1891

Architecture
- Functional status: Active
- Architect: Ole Scheistrøen
- Architectural type: Long church
- Completed: 1890 (136 years ago)

Specifications
- Capacity: 250
- Materials: Wood

Administration
- Diocese: Sør-Hålogaland
- Deanery: Lofoten prosti
- Parish: Moskenes
- Norwegian Cultural Heritage Site
- Type: Church
- Status: Not protected
- ID: 85280

Reine Church (Norwegian: Reine kirke) is a parish church of the Church of Norway in Moskenes Municipality in Nordland county, Norway. It is located in the village of Reine. It is one of the two churches in the Moskenes parish which is part of the Lofoten prosti (deanery) in the Diocese of Sør-Hålogaland. The white, wooden church was built in a long church style in 1890 using plans drawn up by the architect Ole Scheistrøen. The church seats about 250 people. The church was consecrated on 9 January 1891 by Bishop Johannes Nilsson Skaar.

== Media gallery ==
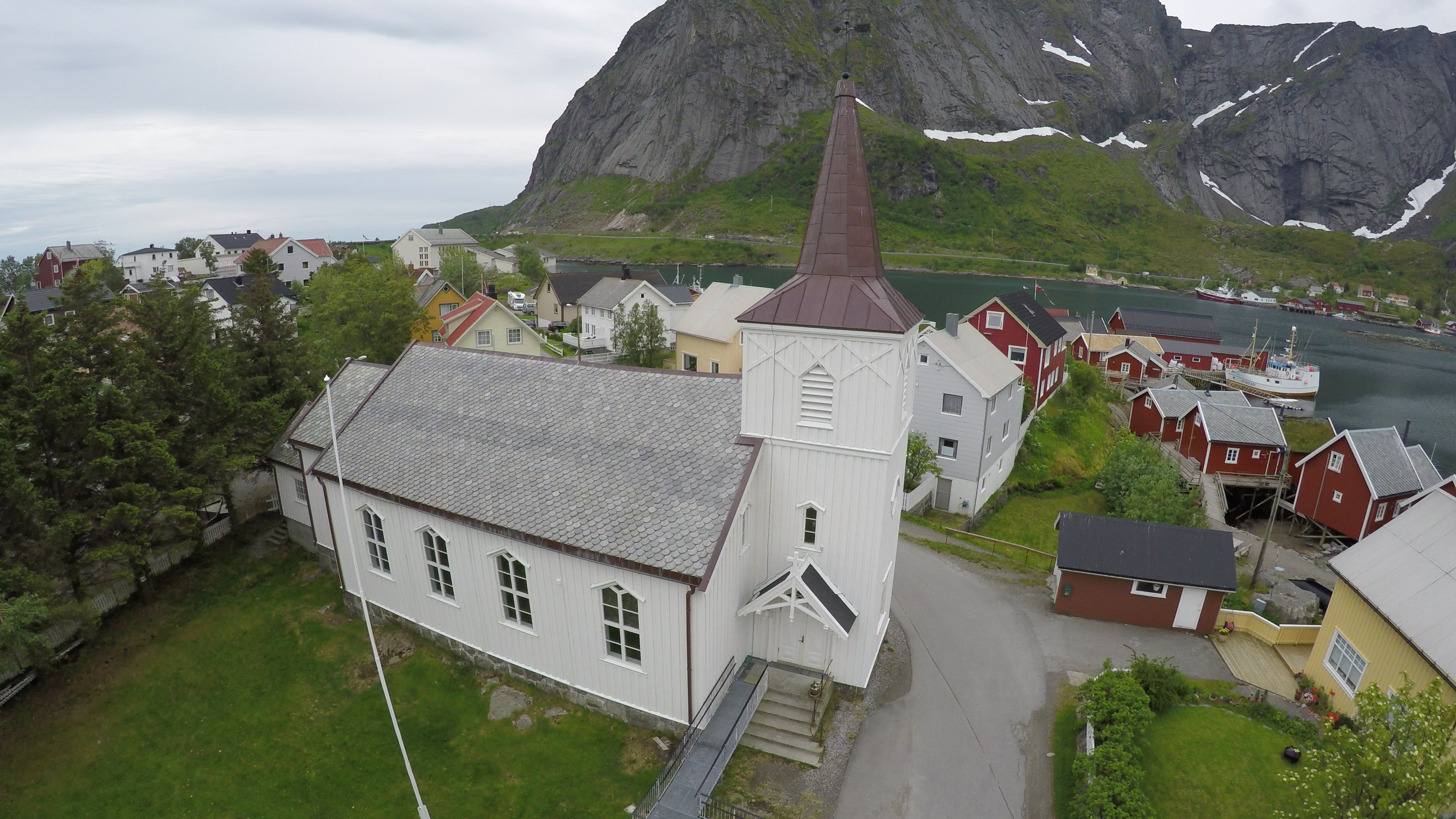

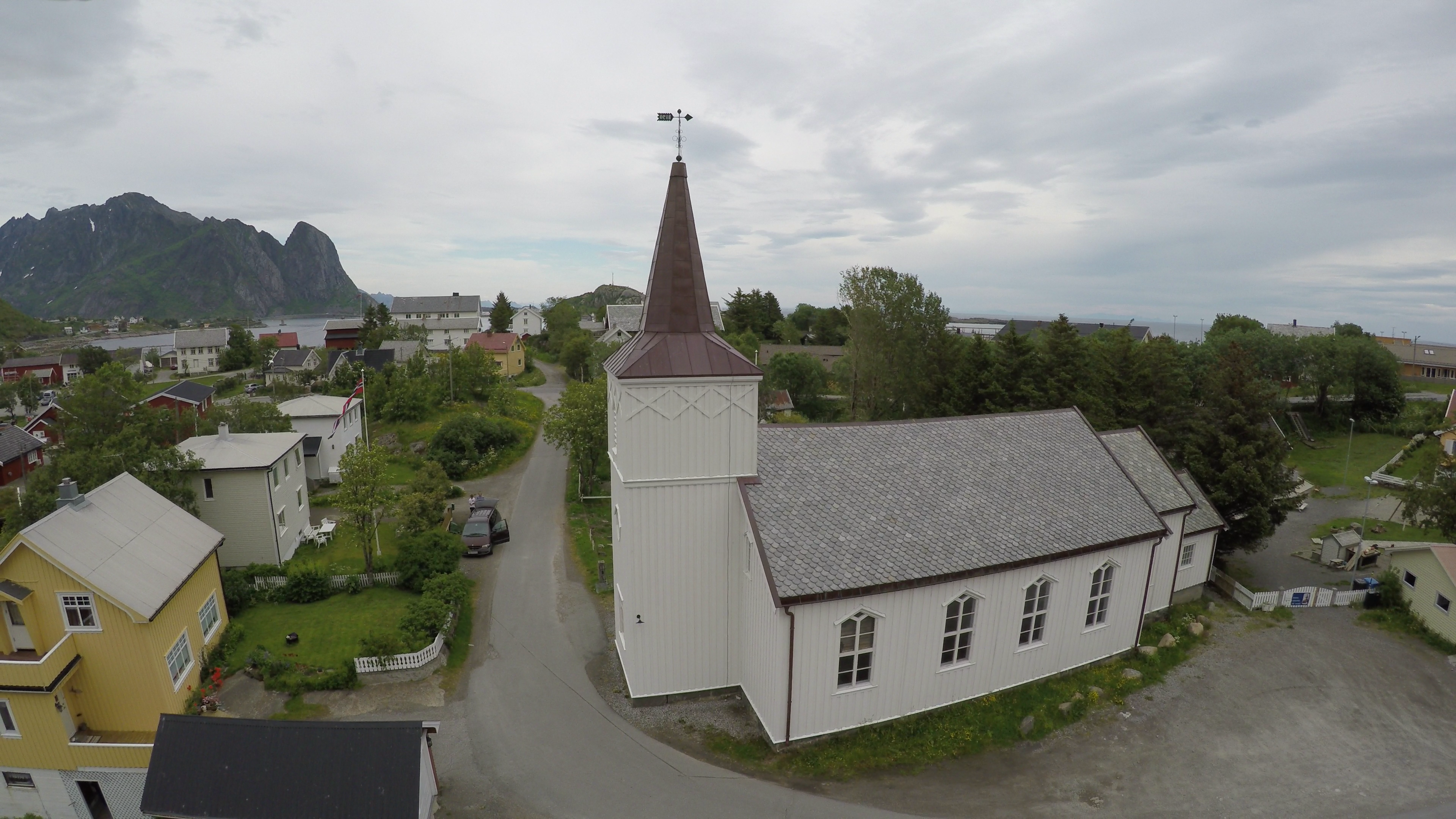

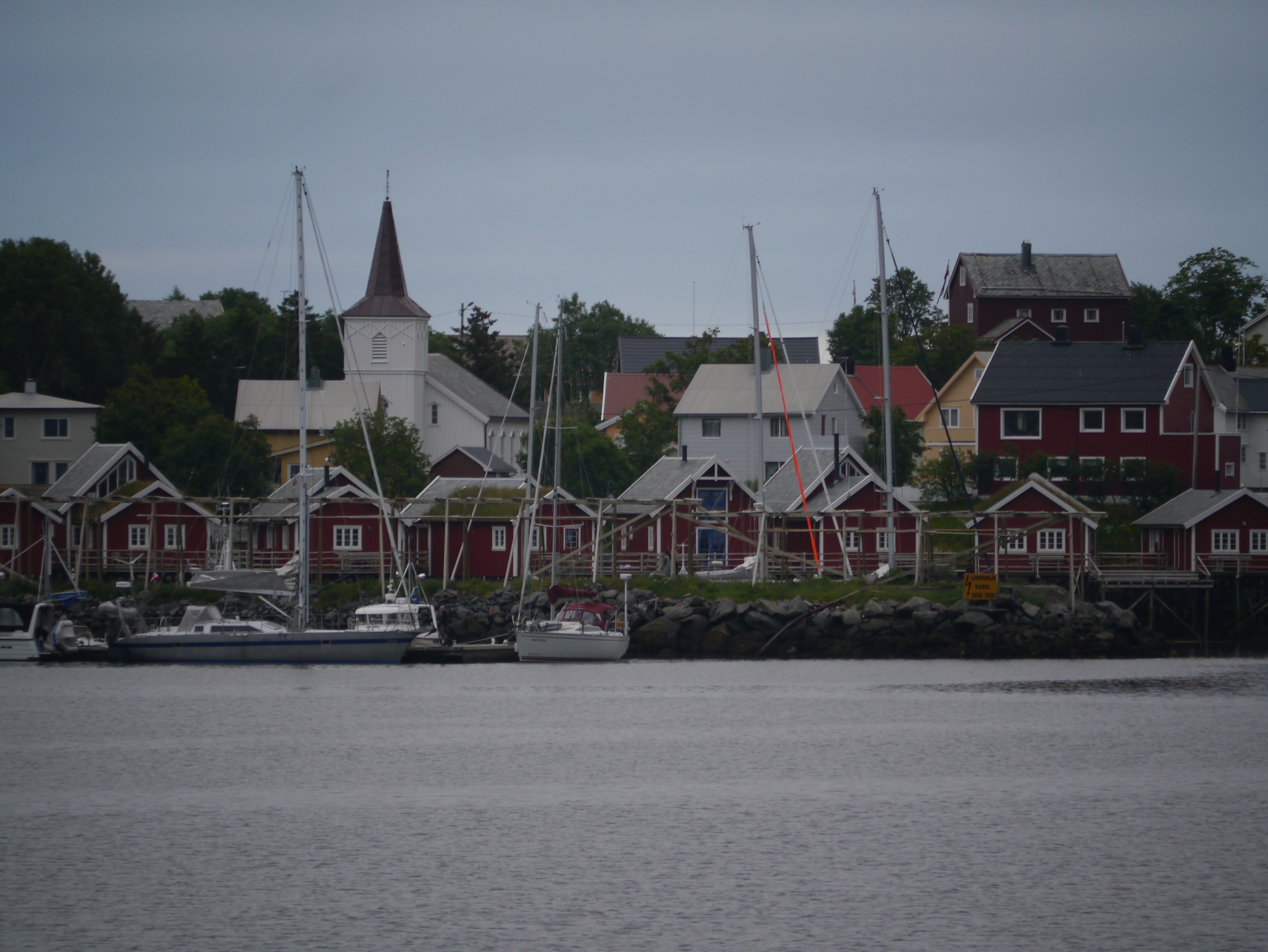

== See also ==
- List of churches in Sør-Hålogaland
