= Lillian Hansen =

Norwegian politician

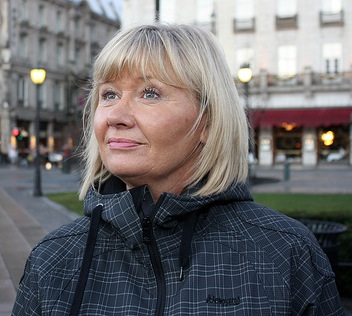
Lillian Hansen

Lillian Hansen (born 17 May 1957) is a Norwegian politician who represents the Labour Party. She is from Moskenes Municipality in Nordland. At the 2009 Norwegian parliamentary election, Hansen was the party's fourth candidate in Nordland.

She was formerly deputy mayor, and mayor of Moskenes Municipality from 2003 to 2007. In her working life, Lillian Hansen was a bus driver.
