= Moskenes Municipality =

Municipality in Nordland, Norway

Moskenes Municipality Moskenes kommune
- Municipality
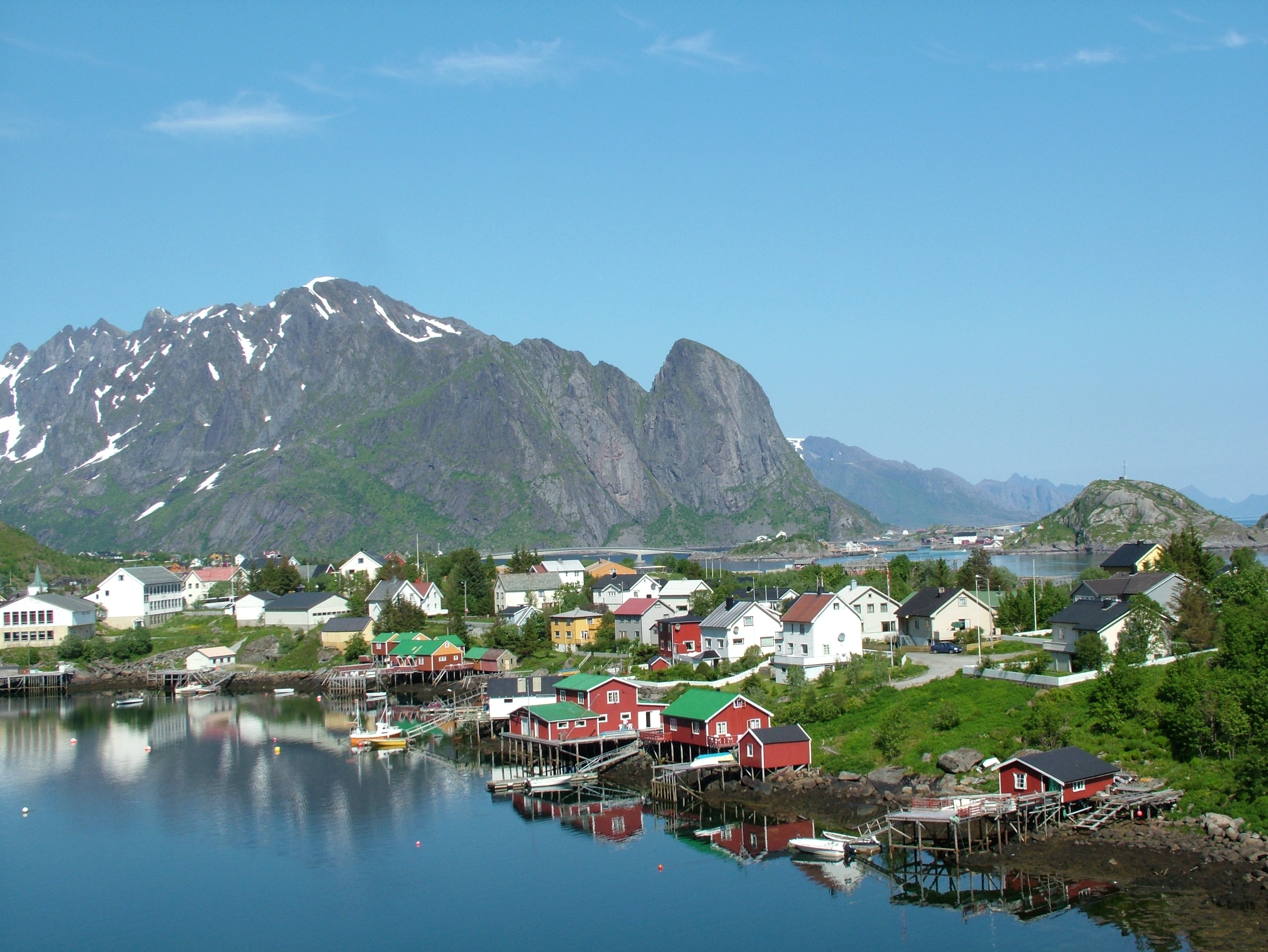
- View of Reine in Moskenes

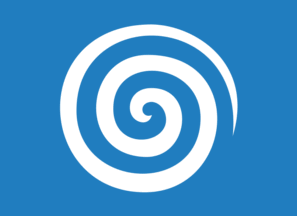
- Flag Coat of arms

- Nordland within Norway

- Moskenes within Nordland
- Coordinates: 67°55′31″N 12°57′32″E
- Country: Norway
- County: Nordland
- District: Lofoten
- Established: 1 July 1916
  - Preceded by: Flakstad Municipality
- Administrative centre: Reine

Government
  - Mayor (2023): Hanna Sverdrup (Local list)

Area
  - Total: 118.78 km^{2} (45.86 sq mi)
  - Land: 110.47 km^{2} (42.65 sq mi)
  - Water: 8.31 km^{2} (3.21 sq mi) 7%
  - Rank: #322 in Norway
- Highest elevation: 1,026.38 m (3,367.4 ft)

Population (2024)
  - Total: 954
  - Rank: #338 in Norway
  - Density: 8/km^{2} (21/sq mi)
  - Change (10 years): ▼ −13.9%
- Demonym: Moskenesfjerding

Official language
  - Norwegian form: Neutral
- Time zone: UTC+01:00 (CET)
  - Summer (DST): UTC+02:00 (CEST)
- ISO 3166 code: NO-1874
- Website: Official website

Moskenes is a municipality in Nordland county, Norway. The municipality comprises the southern part of the island of Moskenesøya in the traditional district of Lofoten. The administrative centre of the municipality is the village of Reine. Other villages include Sørvågen, Hamnøya, and Å.

The 119-square-kilometre (46 sq mi) municipality is the 322nd largest by area out of the 357 municipalities in Norway. Moskenes Municipality is the 338th most populous municipality in Norway with a population of 954. The municipality's population density is 8 inhabitants per square kilometre (21/sq mi) and its population has decreased by 13.9% over the previous 10-year period.

The municipal government owes 100 million kr (as of 2022), and the significance of this debt has made it difficult to find a neighboring municipality that is interested in merging with Moskenes.

== History ==
The municipality was established on 1 July 1916 when the southern part of Flakstad Municipality was separated to become Moskenes. Initially, Moskenes had a population of 1,306.

On 1 January 1964, the Flakstad Municipality and Moskenes Municipality were reunited, as a new, larger Moskenes Municipality. Prior to the merger, Moskenes had 2,001 residents and the new municipality of Moskenes had 4,068 residents. This new municipality did not last long because on 1 January 1976, Flakstad Municipality broke away again to once again form a separate municipality. This left Moskenes with 1,705 residents.

=== Name ===
The municipality (originally the parish) is named after the old Moskenes farm (historically spelled "Muskenes" in 1567) since the first Moskenes Church was built there. The first element is likely an old name for the island. It may have been derived from the word mosk or muskwhich means "sea spray" . The last element is nes which means "headland".

=== Coat of arms ===
The coat of arms was granted on 12 September 1986. The official blazon is "Azure, a gurge argent" (Norwegian: I blått en sølv spiral). This means the arms have a blue field (background) and the charge is a vortex spiral. The spiral has a tincture of argent which means it is commonly colored white, but if it is made out of metal, then silver is used. The blue color in the field and the spiral were chosen to represent vortexes or whirlpools, such as the Moskenstraumen, which appear in the channel just south of the island of Moskenesøya when the tide comes in, making it a hazardous channel. The arms were designed by Arvid Sveen.

== Culture ==
=== Churches ===
The Church of Norway has one parish (sokn) within Moskenes Municipality. It is part of the Lofoten prosti (deanery) in the Diocese of Sør-Hålogaland.

Churches in Moskenes Municipality
Parish (sokn)	Church name	Location of the church	Year built
Moskenes	Moskenes Church	Moskenes	1819
Moskenes	Reine Church	Reine	1890

== Attractions ==
Moskenes is among the most scenic municipalities in all Norway, and the picturesque fishing villages of Hamnøya, Reine, Sørvågen, Moskenes, Å, and Tind all have a dramatic backdrop of jagged peaks rising above the Vestfjorden. The historic Glåpen Lighthouse is located just east of Sørvågen.

Between Lofotodden, the southwestern tip of the Lofoten chain, and the offshore island of Mosken, there is the tidal current of Moskenstraumen. This is better known internationally as the Maelstrom, feared by all sailors. On the isolated northwestern coast of the island, there are also interesting Stone Age cave paintings. The highest mountain is Hermannsdalstinden at 1,029 metres (3,376 ft). Lofotodden National Park is partially located within the municipality.

== Government ==
Moskenes Municipality is responsible for primary education (through 10th grade), outpatient health services, senior citizen services, welfare and other social services, zoning, economic development, and municipal roads and utilities. The municipality is governed by a municipal council of directly elected representatives. The mayor is indirectly elected by a vote of the municipal council. The municipality is under the jurisdiction of the Salten og Lofoten District Court and the Hålogaland Court of Appeal.

=== Municipal council ===
The municipal council (Kommunestyre) of Moskenes Municipality is made up of 17 representatives that are elected to four year terms. The tables below show the current and historical composition of the council by political party.

Moskenes kommunestyre 2023–2027
Party name (in Norwegian)	Number of representatives
Socialist Left Party (Sosialistisk Venstreparti)	4
Local List in Moskenes (Bygdelista i Moskenes)	4
Moskenes Common List (Moskenes Fellesliste)	9
Total number of members:	17

Moskenes kommunestyre 2019–2023
Party name (in Norwegian)	Number of representatives
Socialist Left Party (Sosialistisk Venstreparti)	3
Local List in Moskenes (Bygdelista i Moskenes)	8
Moskenes Common List (Moskenes Fellesliste)	6
Total number of members:	17

Moskenes kommunestyre 2015–2019
Party name (in Norwegian)	Number of representatives
Labour Party (Arbeiderpartiet)	3
Conservative Party (Høyre)	2
Socialist Left Party (Sosialistisk Venstreparti)	1
Local List in Moskenes (Bygdelista i Moskenes)	3
Moskenes Common List (Moskenes Fellesliste)	2
Total number of members:	11

Moskenes kommunestyre 2011–2015
Party name (in Norwegian)	Number of representatives
Labour Party (Arbeiderpartiet)	2
Socialist Left Party (Sosialistisk Venstreparti)	3
Local list in Moskenes (Bygdelista i Moskenes)	4
Moskenes Common List (Moskenes Fellesliste)	8
Total number of members:	17

Moskenes kommunestyre 2007–2011
Party name (in Norwegian)	Number of representatives
Labour Party (Arbeiderpartiet)	5
Progress Party (Fremskrittspartiet)	1
Socialist Left Party (Sosialistisk Venstreparti)	1
Local list in Moskenes (Bygdelista i Moskenes)	2
Moskenes common list (Moskenes fellesliste)	8
Total number of members:	17

Moskenes kommunestyre 2003–2007
Party name (in Norwegian)	Number of representatives
Labour Party (Arbeiderpartiet)	4
Socialist Left Party (Sosialistisk Venstreparti)	8
Local list in Moskenes (Bygdelista i Moskenes)	5
Total number of members:	17

Moskenes kommunestyre 1999–2003
Party name (in Norwegian)	Number of representatives
Labour Party (Arbeiderpartiet)	3
Socialist Left Party (Sosialistisk Venstreparti)	1
Local list western part of Moskenes (Bygdeliste vestre del av Moskenes)	5
Moskenes common list (Moskenes fellesliste)	8
Total number of members:	17

Moskenes kommunestyre 1995–1999
Party name (in Norwegian)	Number of representatives
Labour Party (Arbeiderpartiet)	5
Socialist Left Party (Sosialistisk Venstreparti)	2
Moskenes common list (Moskenes fellesliste)	10
Total number of members:	17

Moskenes kommunestyre 1991–1995
Party name (in Norwegian)	Number of representatives
Labour Party (Arbeiderpartiet)	4
Socialist Left Party (Sosialistisk Venstreparti)	3
Moskenes common list (Moskenes fellesliste)	10
Total number of members:	17

Moskenes kommunestyre 1987–1991
Party name (in Norwegian)	Number of representatives
Labour Party (Arbeiderpartiet)	8
Moskenes common list (Moskenes fellesliste)	6
Moskenes Social-Democratic List (Moskenes Sosialdemokratiske liste)	3
Total number of members:	17

Moskenes kommunestyre 1983–1987
Party name (in Norwegian)	Number of representatives
Labour Party (Arbeiderpartiet)	11
Moskenes Common list (Moskenes Samlingsliste)	6
Total number of members:	17

Moskenes kommunestyre 1979–1983
Party name (in Norwegian)	Number of representatives
Labour Party (Arbeiderpartiet)	10
Christian Democratic Party (Kristelig Folkeparti)	1
Moskenes common list (Moskenes Samlingsliste)	6
Total number of members:	17

Moskenes kommunestyre 1975–1979
Party name (in Norwegian)	Number of representatives
Labour Party (Arbeiderpartiet)	12
Moskenes common list (Moskenes Samlingsliste)	5
Total number of members:	17
Note: Flakstad Municipality was separated (once again) from Moskenes Municipality on 1 January 1976.

Moskenes kommunestyre 1971–1975
Party name (in Norwegian)	Number of representatives
Labour Party (Arbeiderpartiet)	11
Local List(s) (Lokale lister)	16
Total number of members:	27

Moskenes kommunestyre 1967–1971
Party name (in Norwegian)	Number of representatives
Labour Party (Arbeiderpartiet)	10
Local List(s) (Lokale lister)	17
Total number of members:	27

Moskenes kommunestyre 1963–1967
Party name (in Norwegian)	Number of representatives
Labour Party (Arbeiderpartiet)	8
Local List(s) (Lokale lister)	19
Total number of members:	27
Note: Flakstad Municipality became part of Moskenes Municipality on 1 January 1964.

Moskenes herredsstyre 1959–1963
Party name (in Norwegian)	Number of representatives
Labour Party (Arbeiderpartiet)	9
Local List(s) (Lokale lister)	4
Total number of members:	13

Moskenes herredsstyre 1955–1959
Party name (in Norwegian)	Number of representatives
Labour Party (Arbeiderpartiet)	9
Joint List(s) of Non-Socialist Parties (Borgerlige Felleslister)	1
Local List(s) (Lokale lister)	3
Total number of members:	13

Moskenes herredsstyre 1951–1955
Party name (in Norwegian)	Number of representatives
Labour Party (Arbeiderpartiet)	8
Local List(s) (Lokale lister)	4
Total number of members:	12

Moskenes herredsstyre 1947–1951
Party name (in Norwegian)	Number of representatives
Labour Party (Arbeiderpartiet)	8
Joint List(s) of Non-Socialist Parties (Borgerlige Felleslister)	3
Local List(s) (Lokale lister)	1
Total number of members:	12

Moskenes herredsstyre 1945–1947
Party name (in Norwegian)	Number of representatives
Labour Party (Arbeiderpartiet)	9
Local List(s) (Lokale lister)	3
Total number of members:	12

Moskenes herredsstyre 1937–1941*
Party name (in Norwegian)	Number of representatives
Labour Party (Arbeiderpartiet)	7
Local List(s) (Lokale lister)	5
Total number of members:	12
Note: Due to the German occupation of Norway during World War II, no elections were held for new municipal councils until after the war ended in 1945.

=== Mayors ===
The mayor (Norwegian: ordfører) of Moskenes Municipality is the political leader of the municipality and the chairperson of the municipal council. Here is a list of people who have held this position:

- 1916–1934: Kr. Martinussen
- 1934–1937: S.H. Ellingsen
- 1938–1941: Hilmar Tuv (Ap)
- 1941–1945: C.P. Ellingsen (NS)
- 1945–1945: Sigurd Lund Hamran (Ap)
- 1945–1947: Hilmar Tuv (Ap)
- 1948–1956: Anders Lie (Ap)
- 1956–1961: Kristian Bendiksen (Ap)
- 1961–1961: Sigurd Lund Hamran (Ap)
- 1962–1963: Herberg Jensen (Ap)
- 1963–1971: Sigurd Lund Hamran (Ap)
- 1971–1975: Arthur Valen (Ap)
- 1975–1983: Hans Husby (Ap)
- 1983–1987: Rolf Bendiksen (Ap)
- 1987–2003: Geir Wulff-Nilsen (LL)
- 2003–2007: Lillian Hansen (Ap)
- 2007–2011: Geir Wulff-Nilsen (LL)
- 2011–2023: Lillian Rasmussen (LL/SV)
- 2023–present: Hanna Sverdrup (LL)

== Geography ==
Moskenes has a subarctic climate (Köppen Dfc). The municipality of Moskenes lies near the southern end of the Lofoten archipelago on the southern part of the island of Moskenesøya. The Vestfjorden lies to the east, the Moskenstraumen strait lies to the south, and the Norwegian Sea lies to the west. Flakstad Municipality lies to the north (on the northern part of the same island) and the nearby Værøy Municipality is located on islands about 20 kilometres (12 mi) to the south. The highest point in the municipality is the 1,026.38-metre (3,367.4 ft) tall mountain Hermannsdalstinden.

=== Climate ===
Climate data for Reine 1961-90
Month	Jan	Feb	Mar	Apr	May	Jun	Jul	Aug	Sep	Oct	Nov	Dec	Year
Daily mean °C (°F)	−0.3 (31.5)	−0.5 (31.1)	0.2 (32.4)	2.2 (36.0)	6.2 (43.2)	9.3 (48.7)	11.7 (53.1)	11.8 (53.2)	8.5 (47.3)	5.8 (42.4)	2.6 (36.7)	0.5 (32.9)	4.8 (40.6)
Average precipitation mm (inches)	240 (9.4)	207 (8.1)	183 (7.2)	145 (5.7)	89 (3.5)	93 (3.7)	121 (4.8)	140 (5.5)	228 (9.0)	322 (12.7)	244 (9.6)	273 (10.7)	2,285 (90.0)
Average precipitation days (≥ 1 mm)	19.6	17.8	16.6	16.2	12.6	11.5	12.8	13.9	19.0	21.3	20.5	21.8	203.6
Source: Norwegian Meteorological Institute

== Notable people ==
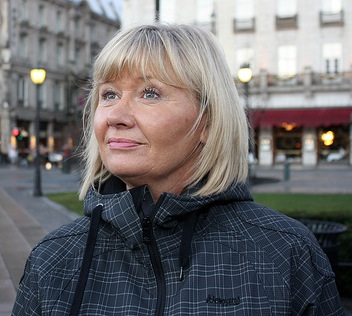
Lillian Hansen, 2012

- Birger Eriksen (1875 in Flakstad – 1958), a naval commander at Oscarsborg Fortress, where the German cruiser Blücher was sunk in 1940
- Rolv Thesen (1896 in Moskenes – 1966), a poet, literary researcher, and literary critic
- Rolf Bendiksen (born 1938 in Moskenes), a Norwegian politician who was Mayor of Moskenes from 1983 to 1987
- Lillian Hansen (born 1957 in Moskenes), a bus driver, member of parliament, and mayor
- Hans Erik Dyvik Husby (born 1972), known as Hank von Hell, a punk rock musician who lived in Moskenes

== Gallery ==
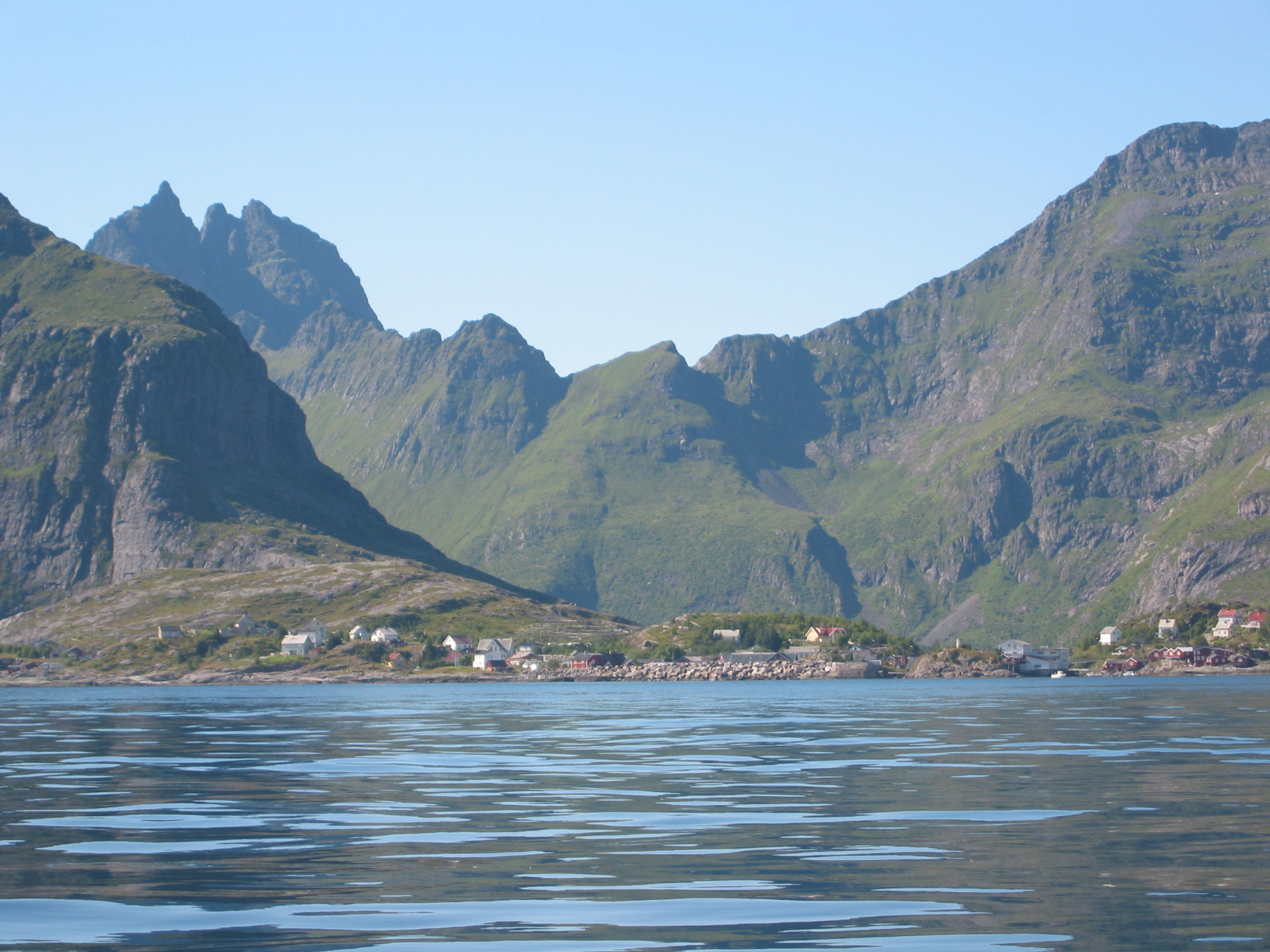
Near Å, Moskenes

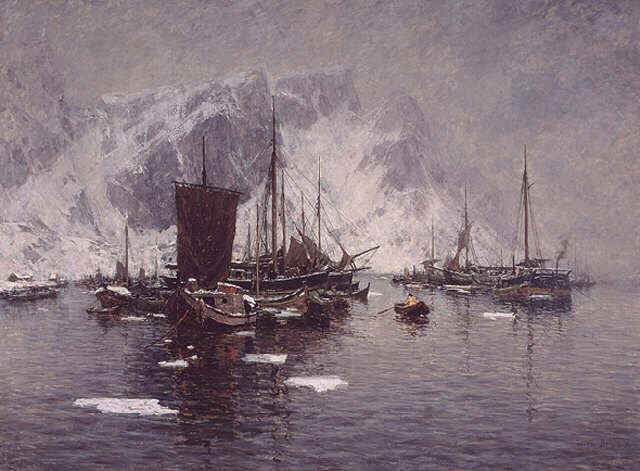
Fiskebåter ved Reine; by Gunnar Berg.

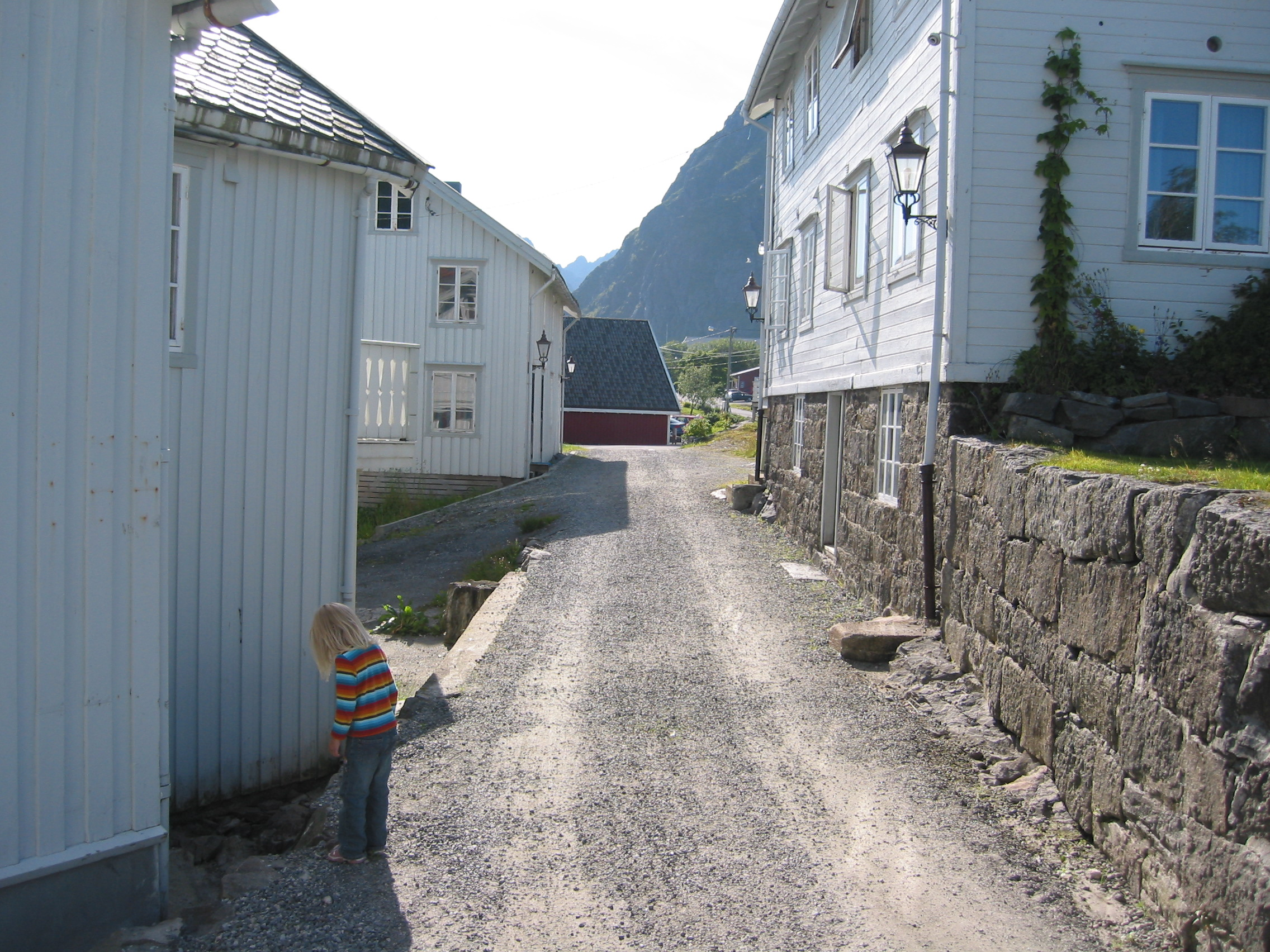
Sørvågen

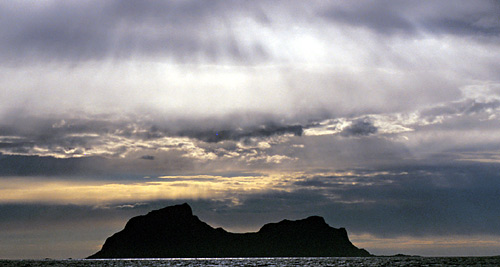
Moskenes to the west

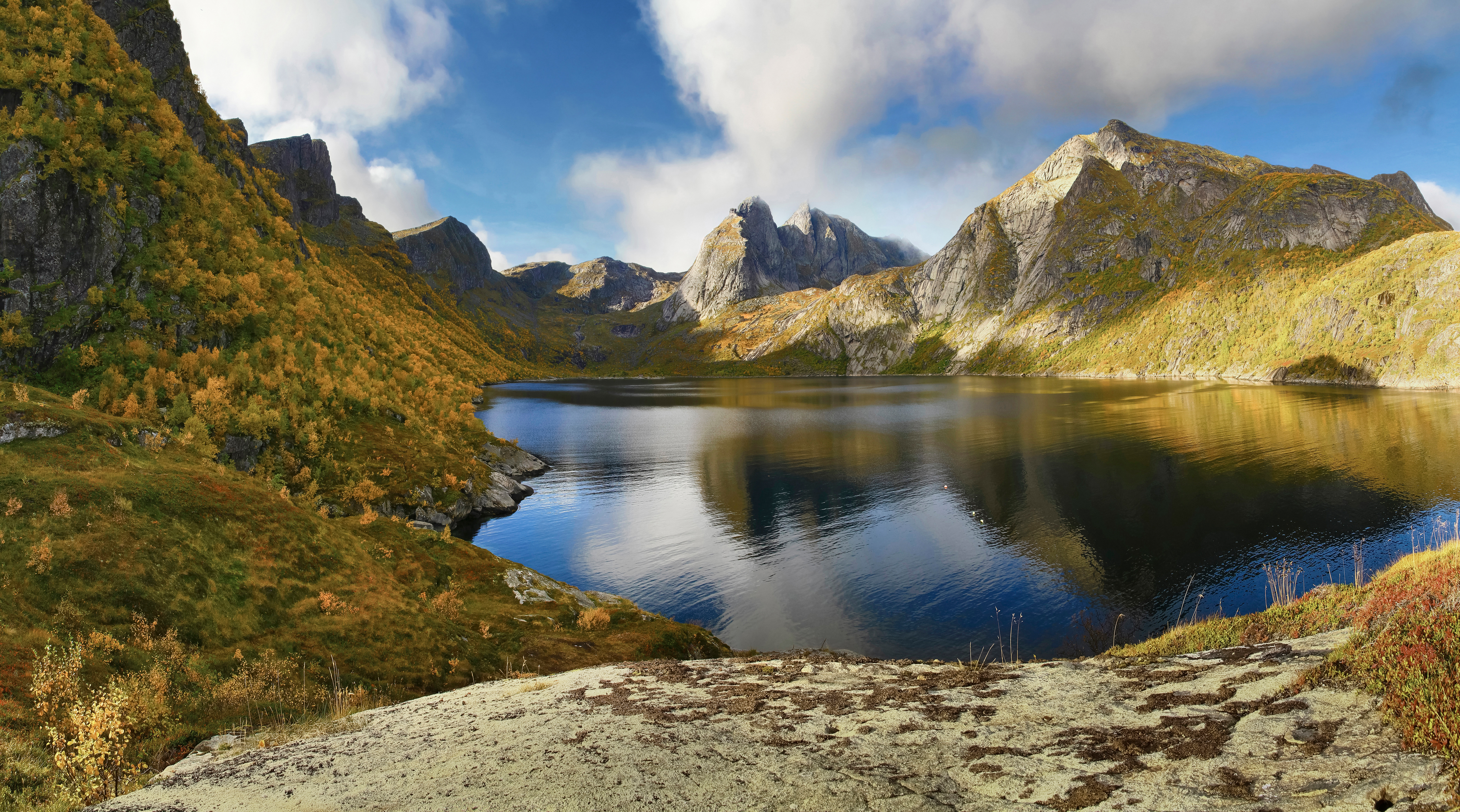
Djupfjorden in 2010 September.
