= Moskenes Church =

- Moskenes kirke
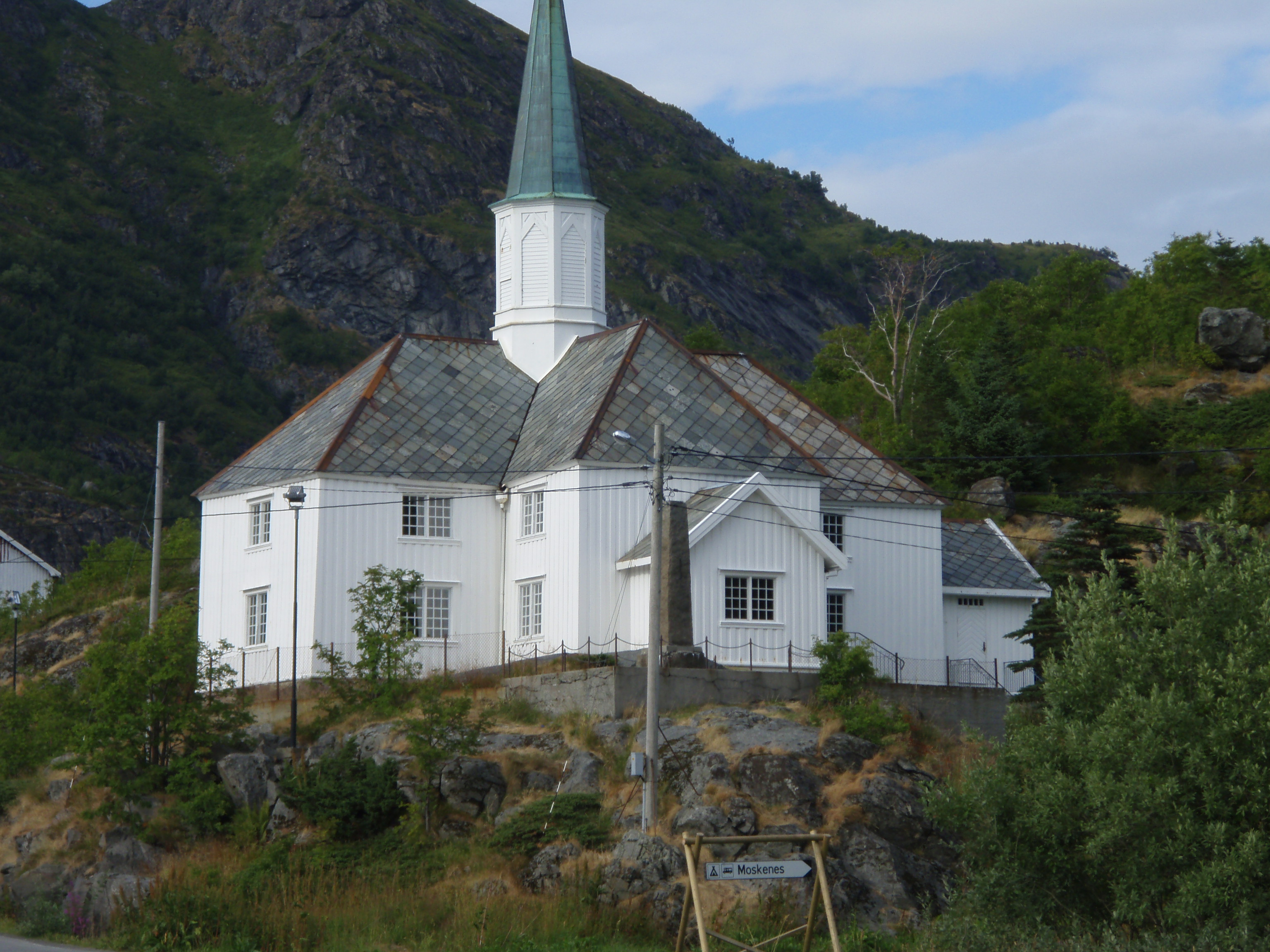
- View of the church
- Moskenes Church
- 67.9005090°N 13.04696068°E
- Location: Moskenes, Nordland
- Country: Norway
- Denomination: Church of Norway
- Churchmanship: Evangelical Lutheran

History
- Status: Parish church
- Founded: 16th century
- Consecrated: 1 August 1821

Architecture
- Functional status: Active
- Architect: Kirsten Wleügel Knutssøn
- Architectural type: Cruciform
- Completed: 1819 (207 years ago)

Specifications
- Capacity: 280
- Materials: Wood

Administration
- Diocese: Sør-Hålogaland
- Deanery: Lofoten prosti
- Parish: Moskenes
- Norwegian Cultural Heritage Site
- Type: Church
- Status: Automatically protected
- ID: 84977

Moskenes Church (Norwegian: Moskenes kirke) is a parish church of the Church of Norway in Moskenes Municipality in Nordland county, Norway. It is located in the village of Moskenes, located immediately north of the village of Sørvågen. It is one of the two churches for the Moskenes parish which is part of the Lofoten prosti (deanery) in the Diocese of Sør-Hålogaland. The white, wooden church was built in a cruciform style in 1819 using plans drawn up by the architect Kirsten Wleügel Knutssøn. The church seats about 280 people.

== History ==
The earliest existing historical records of the church in Moskenes date back to 1589, but the church was not new that year. In 1750, the church was described as a small wooden church with a flat roof and no steeple or sacristy. It had a small cemetery with a nice stone wall around it. That church was torn down and replaced in 1819 by the present wooden, cruciform church. The new church was not consecrated until 1 August 1821.

== Media gallery ==
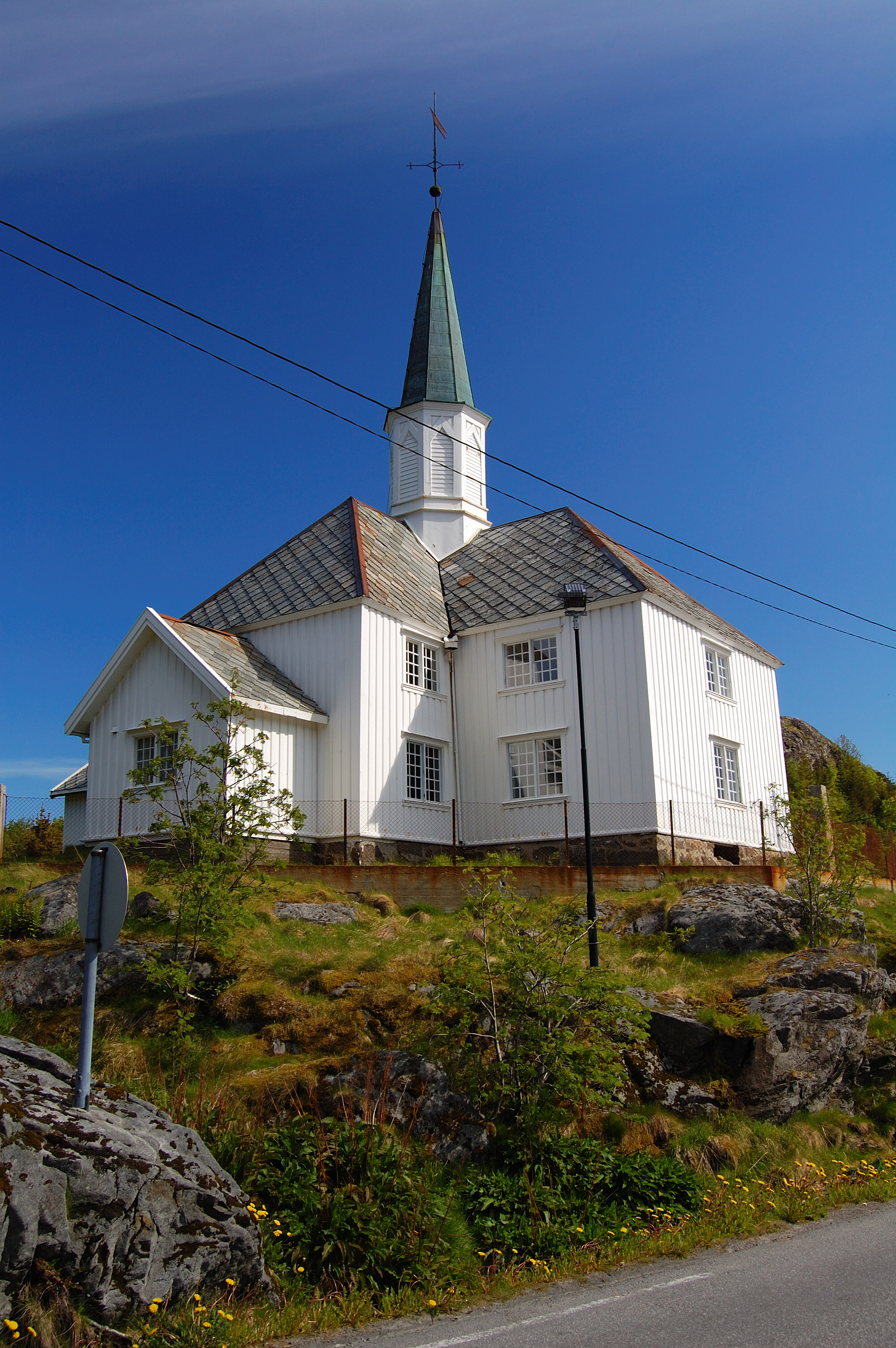

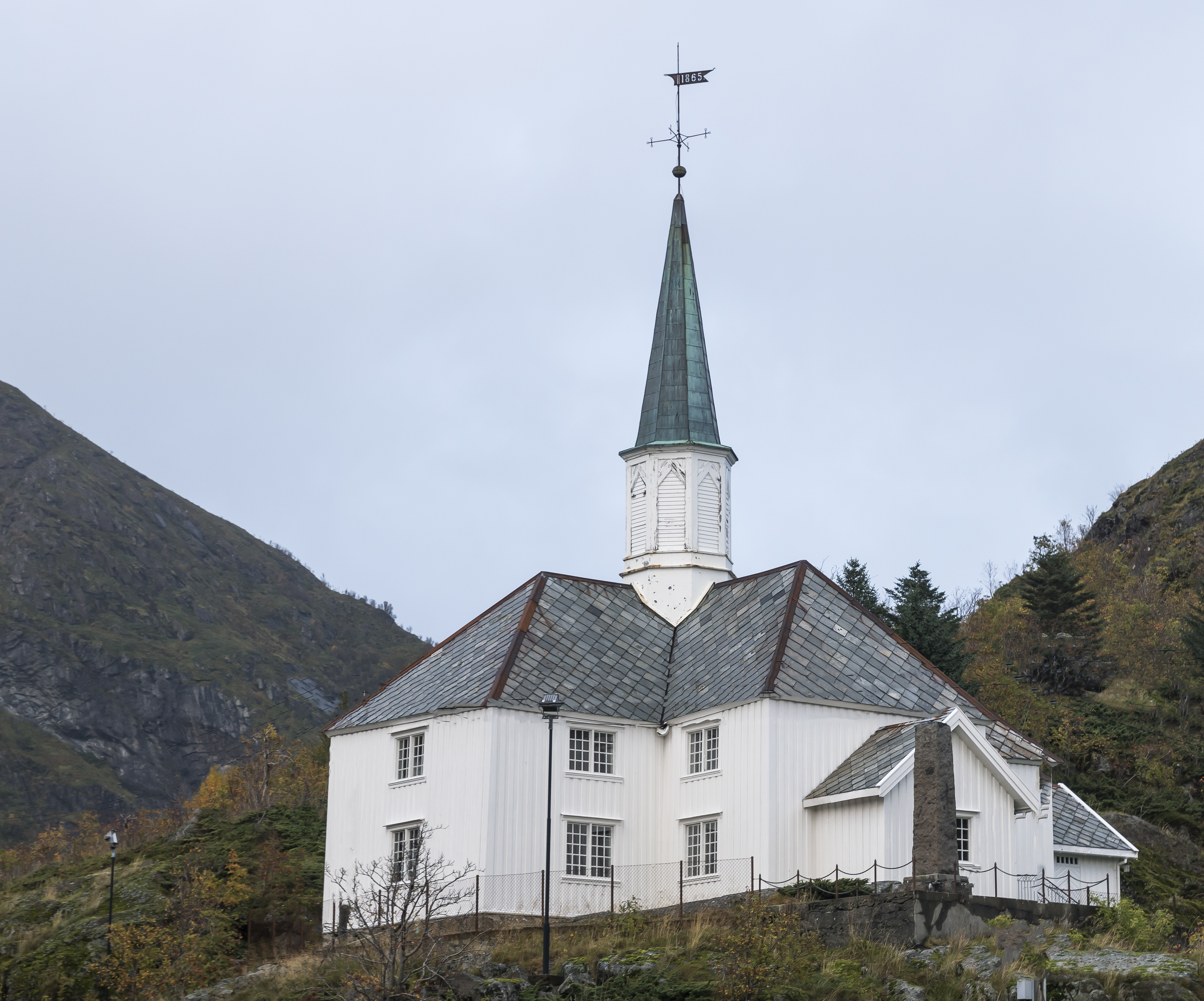

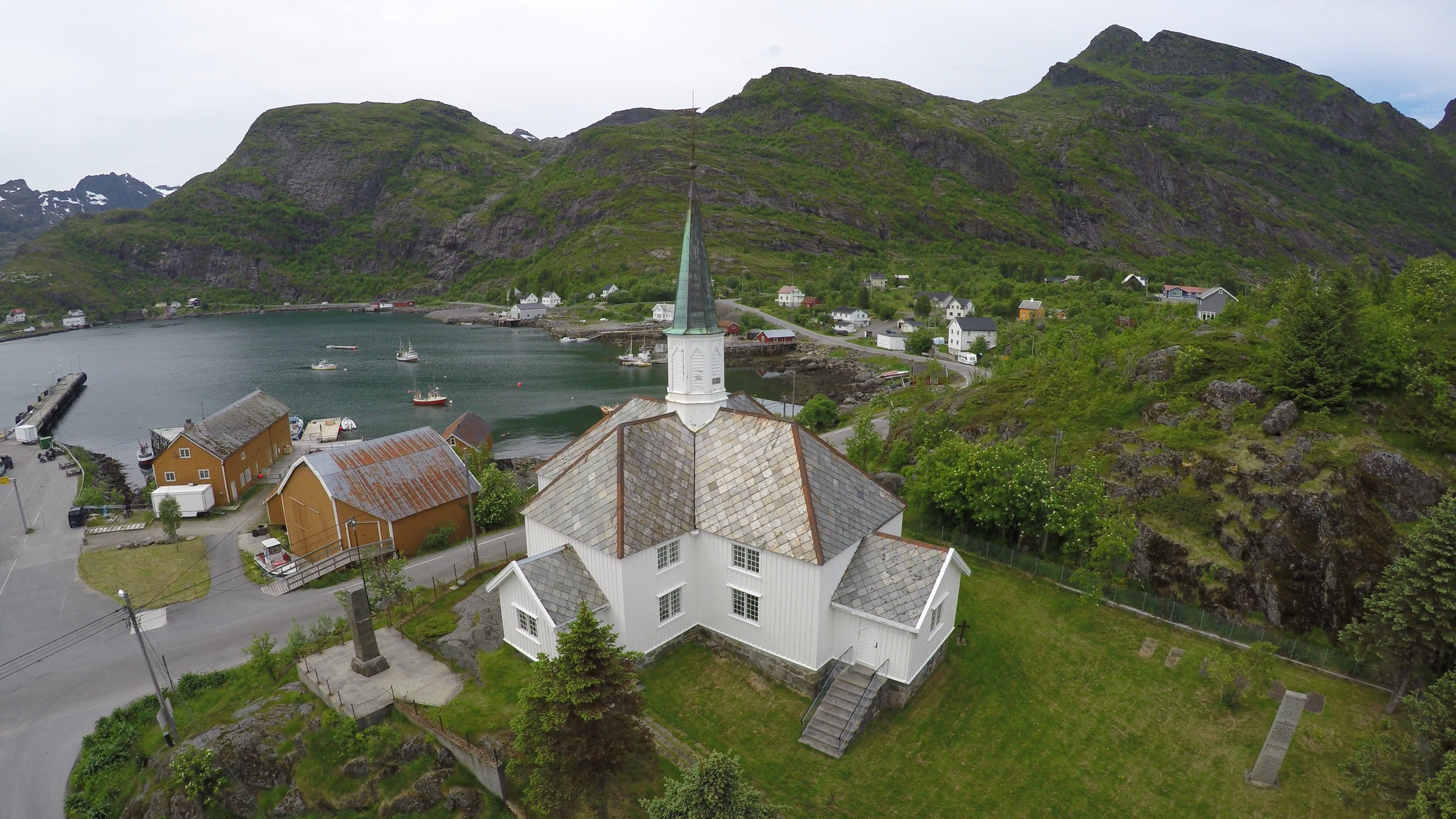

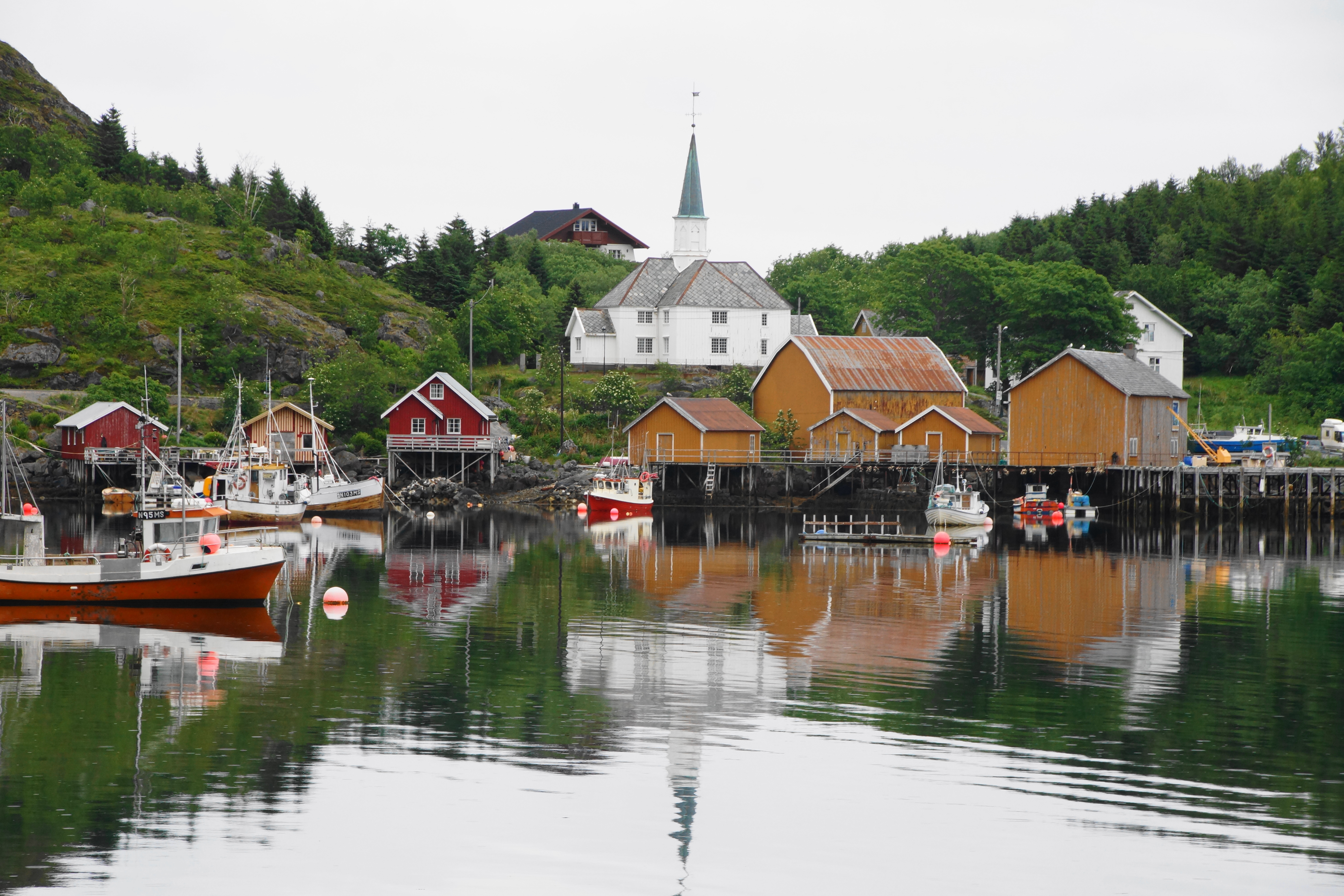

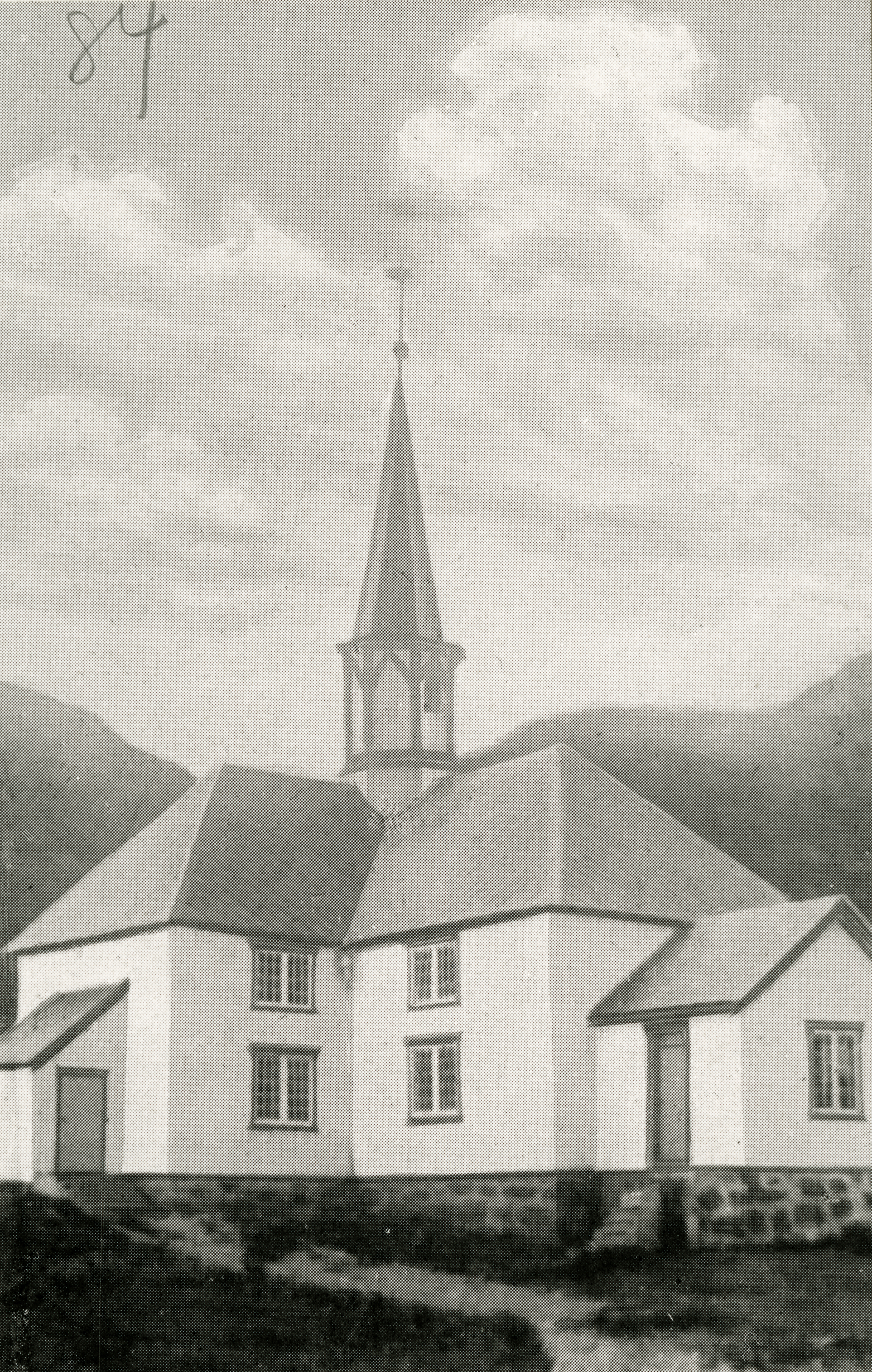

== See also ==
- List of churches in Sør-Hålogaland
