= Sørvågen, Moskenes =

Village in Moskenes Municipality, Norway

Sørvågen
- Village
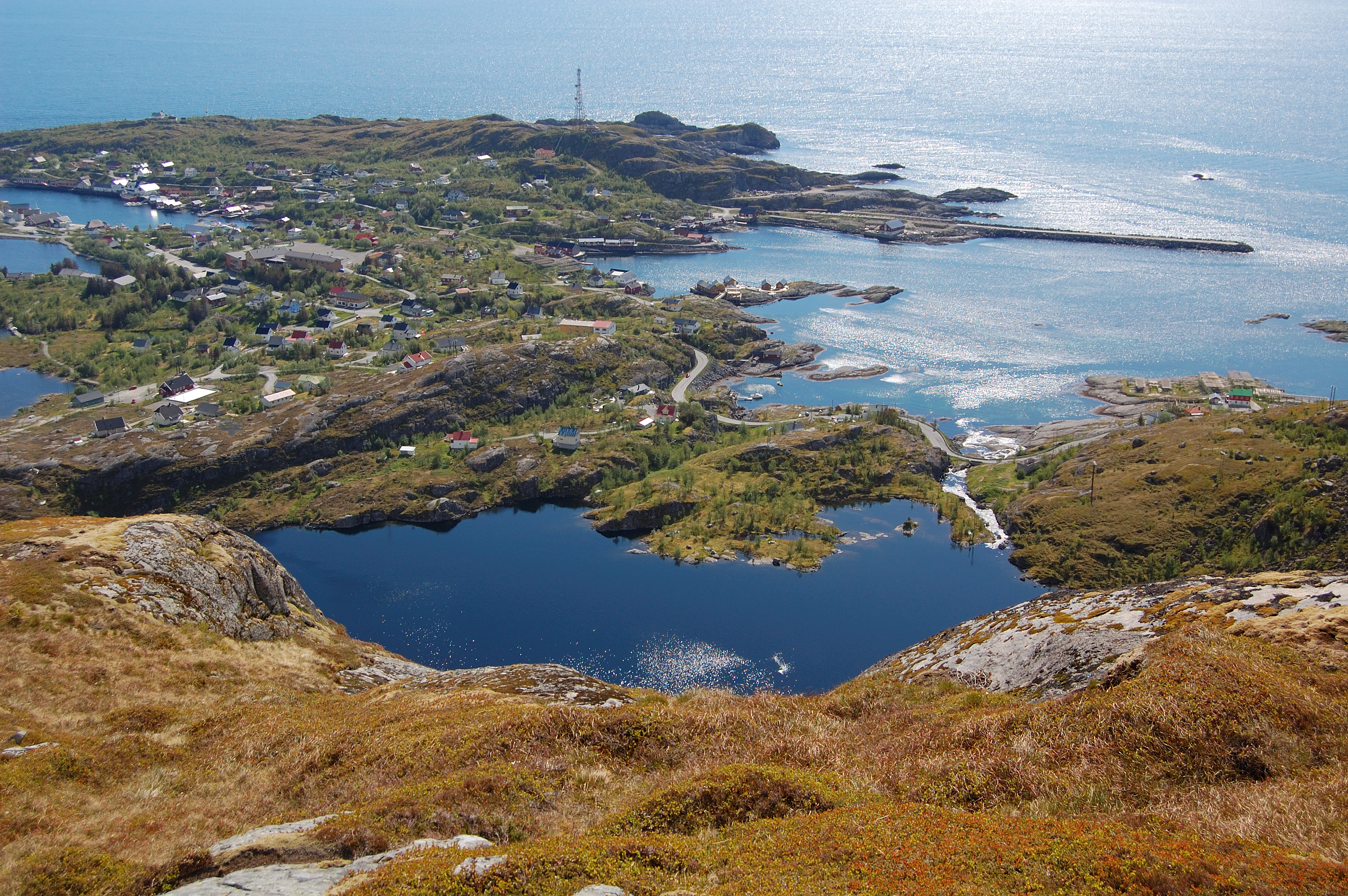
- View of the western part of the village
- Interactive map of Sørvågen
- Location within Nordland Location within Norway
- Coordinates: 67.8897°N 13.0164°E
- Country: Norway
- Region: Northern Norway
- County: Nordland
- District: Lofoten
- Municipality: Moskenes Municipality

Area
  - Total: 0.62 km^{2} (0.24 sq mi)
- Elevation: 12 m (39 ft)

Population (2023)
  - Total: 403
  - Density: 650/km^{2} (1,700/sq mi)
- Time zone: UTC+01:00 (CET)
  - Summer (DST): UTC+02:00 (CEST)
- Post Code: 8392 Sørvågen

Sørvågen is a fishing village in Moskenes Municipality in Nordland county, Norway. It is located on the island of Moskenesøya in the Lofoten archipelago. The village of Å lies just to the south. Moskenes Church is located in the northern part of the village along European route E10, in an area that is known as the village of Moskenes (although the two villages have grown together by conurbation and are now considered one urban area by Statistics Norway).

The 0.62-square-kilometre (150-acre) village has a population (2023) of 403 and a population density of 650 inhabitants per square kilometre (1,700/sq mi).

== Tourism ==
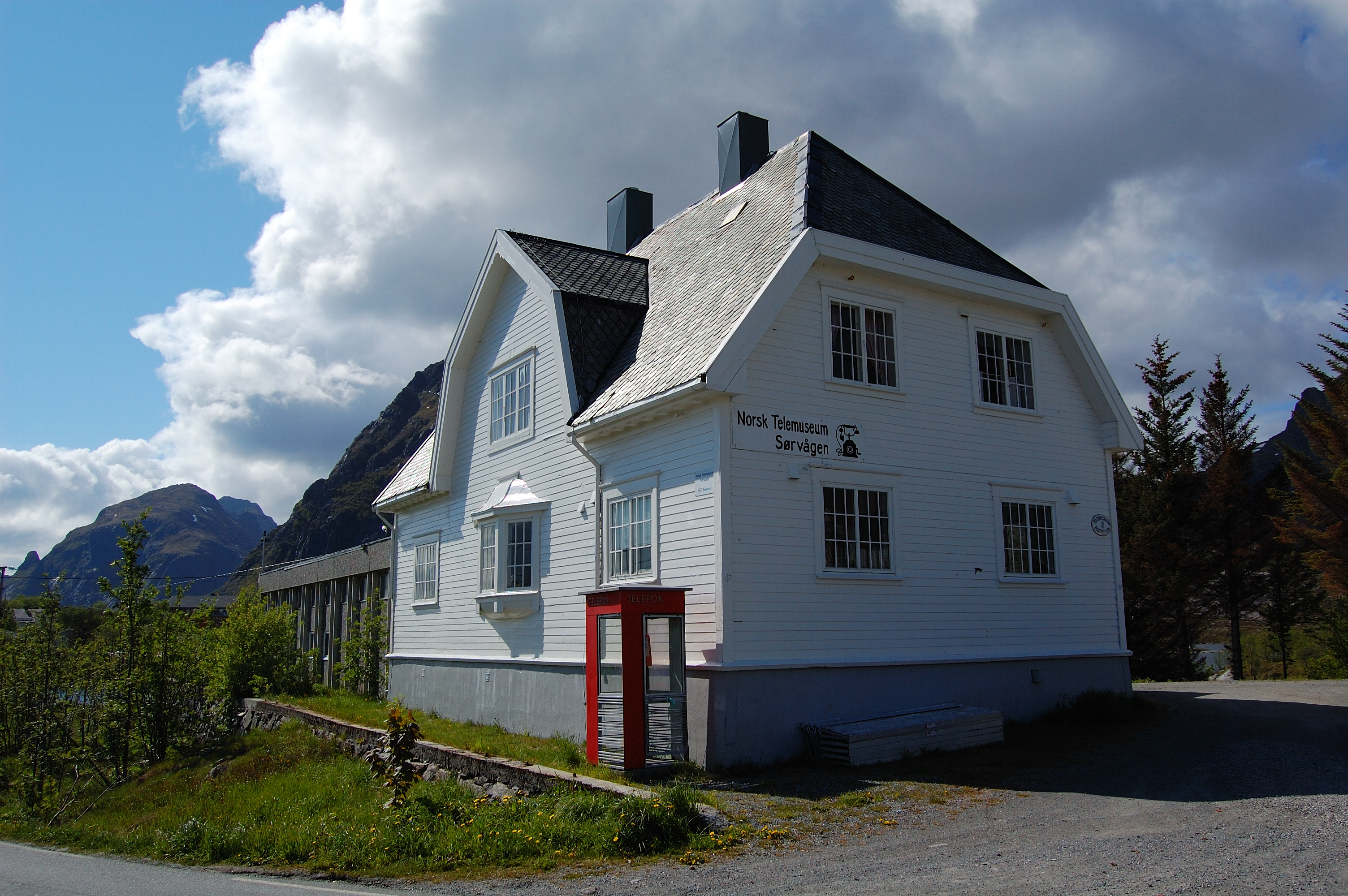
The Norwegian Telecom Museum

The village has several scenic and tourist attractions in and around the village. It contains a local department of the Norsk Telemuseum (Norwegian Telecom Museum) which reflects the local history of telegraphy.

In 1861, the island became part of the 170-kilometre-long (110 mi) Lofoten telegraph line with a station in Sørvågen (which became the Sørvågen museum in 1914), being finally connected with Europe in 1867.

In 1906, a wireless telegraph system was installed in Sørvågen—the second in Europe after Italy—connecting Sørvågen with Røst.
