= Uzushio =

Uzushio, meaning a whirlpool in Japanese, may also refer to:

- Uzushio (train), a train service in Japan
- Naruto whirlpools
- A submarine of Japan Maritime Self-Defense Force
  - JDS Uzushio (SS-566), an Uzushio class submarine
  - JDS Uzushio (SS-592), an Oyashio class submarine
