= Jonas Danilssønn Ramus =

Norwegian priest, author and historian

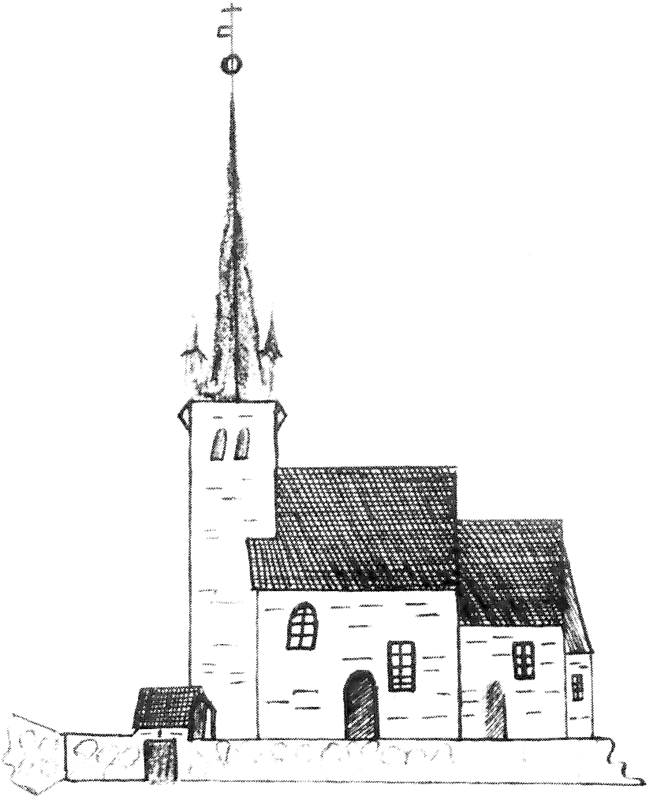
Norderhov kirke, sketch by L. D. Klüwer (1823)

Jonas Danilssønn Ramus (27 September 1649 − 16 May 1718) was a Norwegian priest, author and historian. He is principally known as an author of religious and historical writings.

== Background ==
Ramus was born at Aukra in Møre og Romsdal, Norway. His parents were parish priest Danil Johnsen Ramus (d. 1654) and Anna Christensdatter Bernhoft (1624–1705). Ramus belonged to a family of clerics, with the father, grandfather, stepfather and two brothers, clerics and scholars in various positions. He lost his father early, but her stepfather, Hans Olsen Brejer, took responsibility for his basic education. After studies at the Trondheim Cathedral School, in 1665 he was discharged to the University of Copenhagen with two of his brothers. For the next 15 years, he is believed to have continued studying in Copenhagen.

== Career ==
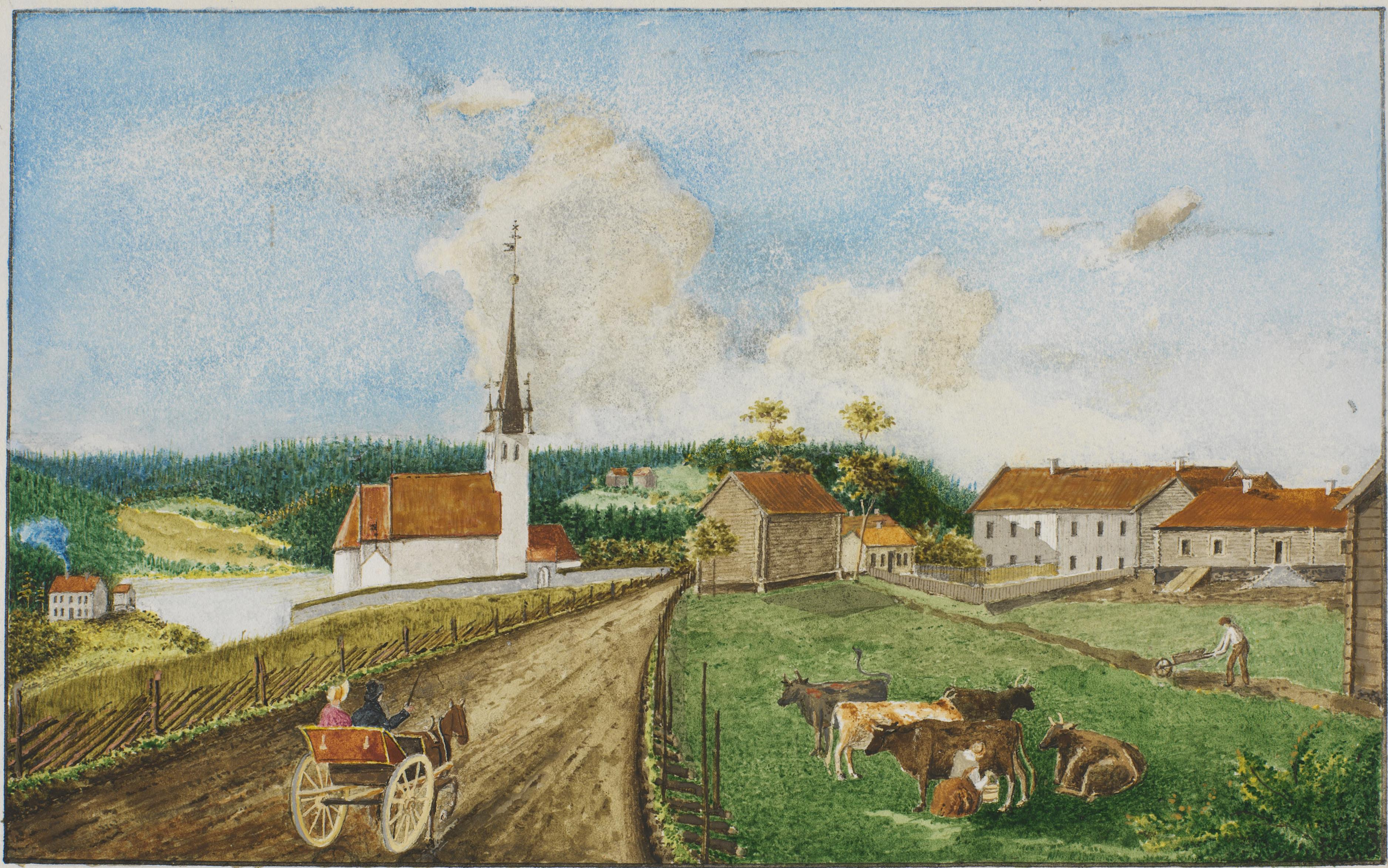
Nordrehaug i Ringeriget by Peter Andreas Brandt (1792-1862

In the 1680s Ramus became personnel chaplain in Sørum Church (Sørum kirke) in Romerike under the priest Colbjørn Torstensen Arneberg. From 1690 Ramus was senior priest of Norderhov Church (Norderhov kirke) in Ringerike in Buskerud. Ramus became a magistrate in 1698.

In 1680, he published his first book, Naadens aandelige Markets-Tiid. It quickly became popular and was issued in both Swedish and Danish editions. Ramus also wrote about the famous Maelstrom at Moskenstraumen. His work was read by Edgar Allan Poe and featured in his short story A Descent into the Maelström (1841).

Perhaps his best known book was Norges Beskrivelse which contains a poem about a feral child, Jostedalsrypa. She was the only survivor of the Black Death in the remote Jostedalen valley after of the Black Death (Svartedauden).

== Anna Colbjørnsdatter ==
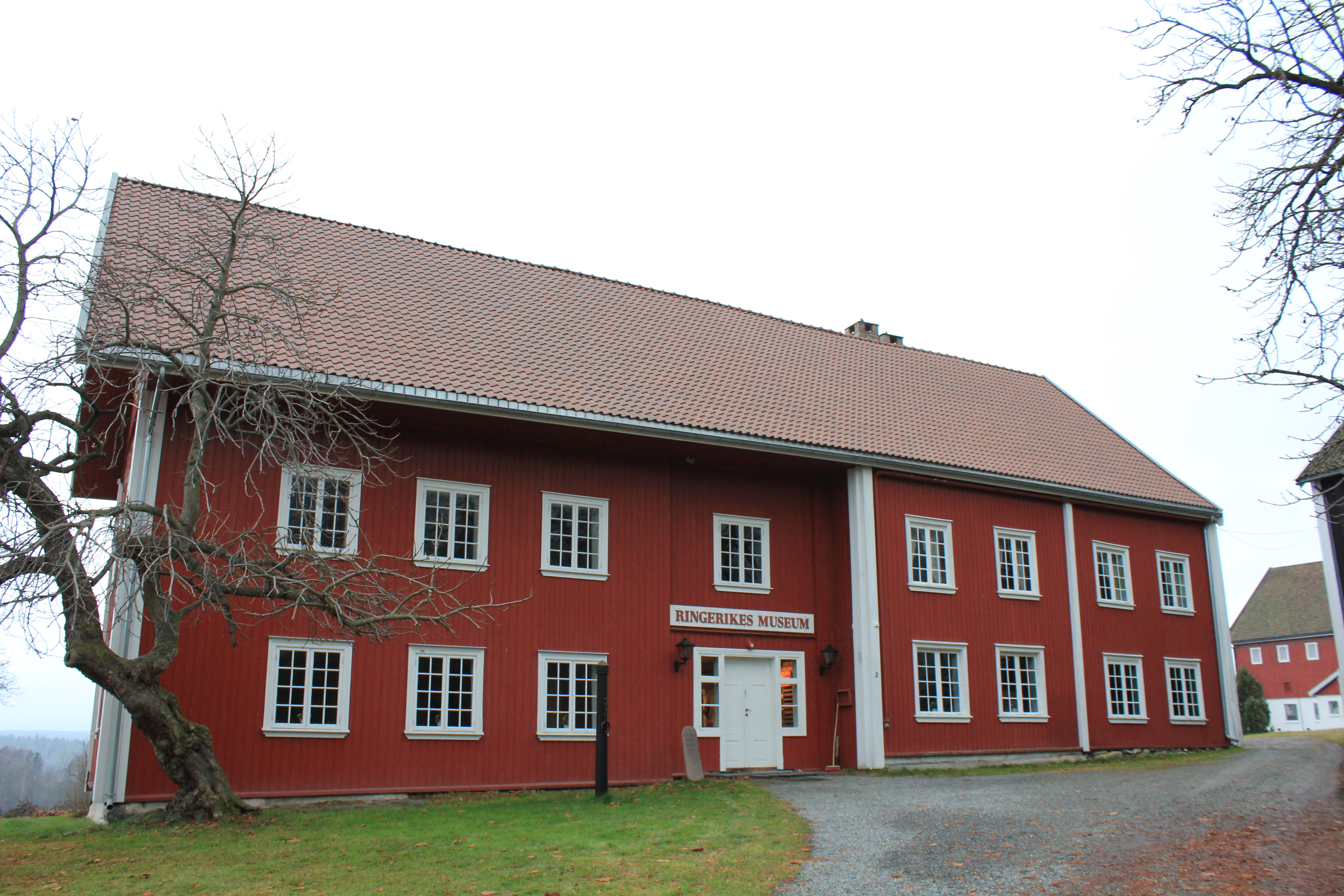
Former Norderhov Rectory now Ringerikes Museum

In 1682, he married Anna Colbjørnsdatter (ca. 1667- 1736), the daughter of pastor Colbjørn Torstensen Arneberg (1628–1720) in Sørum. They had five children: Ole (1683-1714), Daniel (1684-1727), Johanna (1685-1717), Christian (1686-1714) and Anna Sophie (1687-1722), all of whom were born in Sørum. Their son, Daniel Ramus followed his father as a priest in Norderhov from 1717, when his father was sick. Ramus died in 1718 at Norderhov.

Anna Colbjørnsdatter became known for her role in the skirmish at Norderhov (Slaget på Norderhov) between Norwegian-Danish and Swedish forces on 29 March 1716. She and her family were residing in the Norderhov Rectory in Ringerike. Reportedly she alerted the Norwegians to the presence of the troops of King Charles XII of Sweden in the church yard at Norderhov, where they had taken shelter in and around the rectory. The event itself was first published by Peter Andreas Munch in his book, Norges, Sveriges og Danmarks Historie til Skolebrug (1838).

Her half-brothers, Hans Colbjørnsen (1675-1754) and Peder Colbjørnsen (1683–1738), were successful timber merchants in Fredrikshald. Both were active in leading the civilian resistance to the Swedish attacks of Fredrikshald during 1716 and 1718.

== Selected works ==
- Naadens aandelige Markets-Tiid (1680)
- Noris Regum (1698)
- Guds Rige blandt Verdens Riger (1702)
- Ulysses & Outinus unus & idem (1714)
- Norges Beskrivelse (1715)
- Norriges Kongers Historie (1719)

== Other sources ==
- Bang, A. B. Jonas Ramus og Anna Colbjørnsdatter (Ringerike: 1966–67)
