= Mosken =

Island in Nordland, Norway

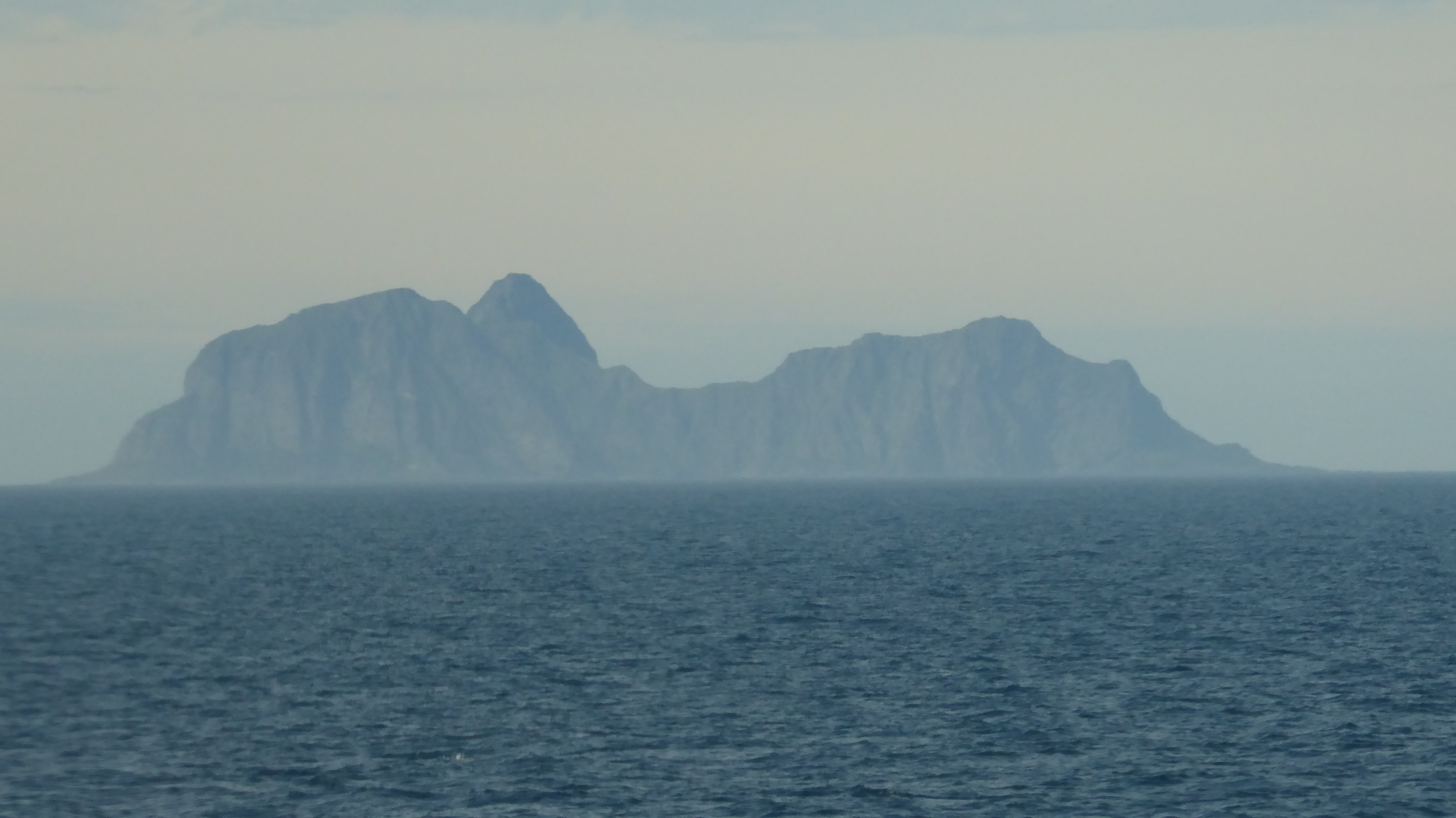
- Interactive map of Mosken

Geography
- Location: Nordland, Norway
- Coordinates: 67.7458°N 12.7554°E
- Archipelago: Lofoten
- Area: 1.5 km^{2} (0.58 sq mi)
- Length: 2.2 km (1.37 mi)
- Width: 1.2 km (0.75 mi)
- Highest elevation: 385 m (1263 ft)
- Highest point: Wilhelmstind

Administration
- Norway
- County: Nordland
- Municipality: Værøy Municipality

Demographics
- Population: 0 (2018)

Mosken is a small uninhabited rocky island in Værøy Municipality in Nordland county, Norway. The 1.5-square-kilometre (0.58 sq mi) island is located in the Lofoten archipelago about halfway between the islands of Værøya to the south and Moskenesøya to the north. The Moskenstraumen maelstrom—one of the most powerful in the world—is located on the north side of the island of Mosken. Historically, the island was used for grazing sheep in both the summer and the winter.

== Media gallery ==
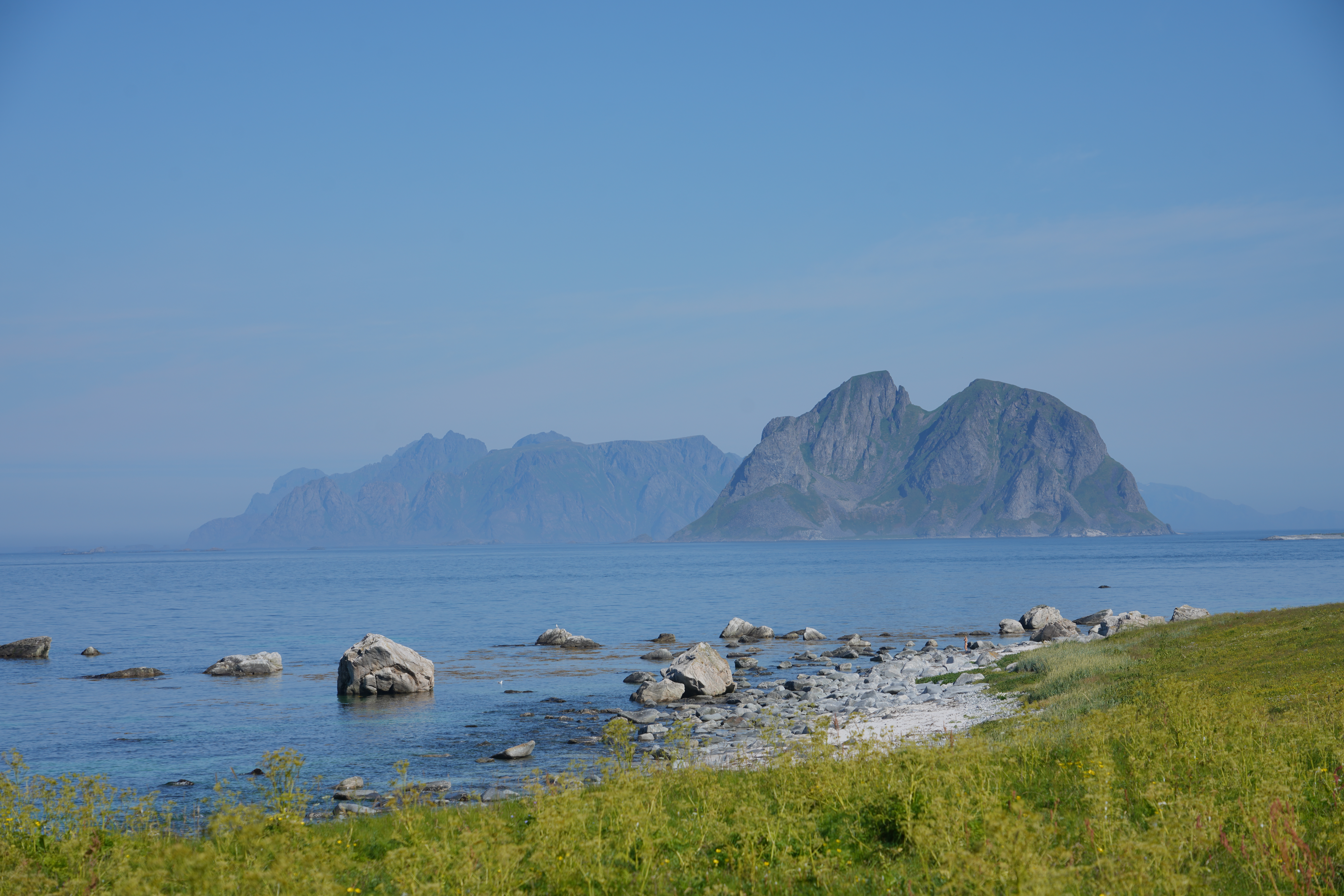
Mosken with Moskenesøya in the background

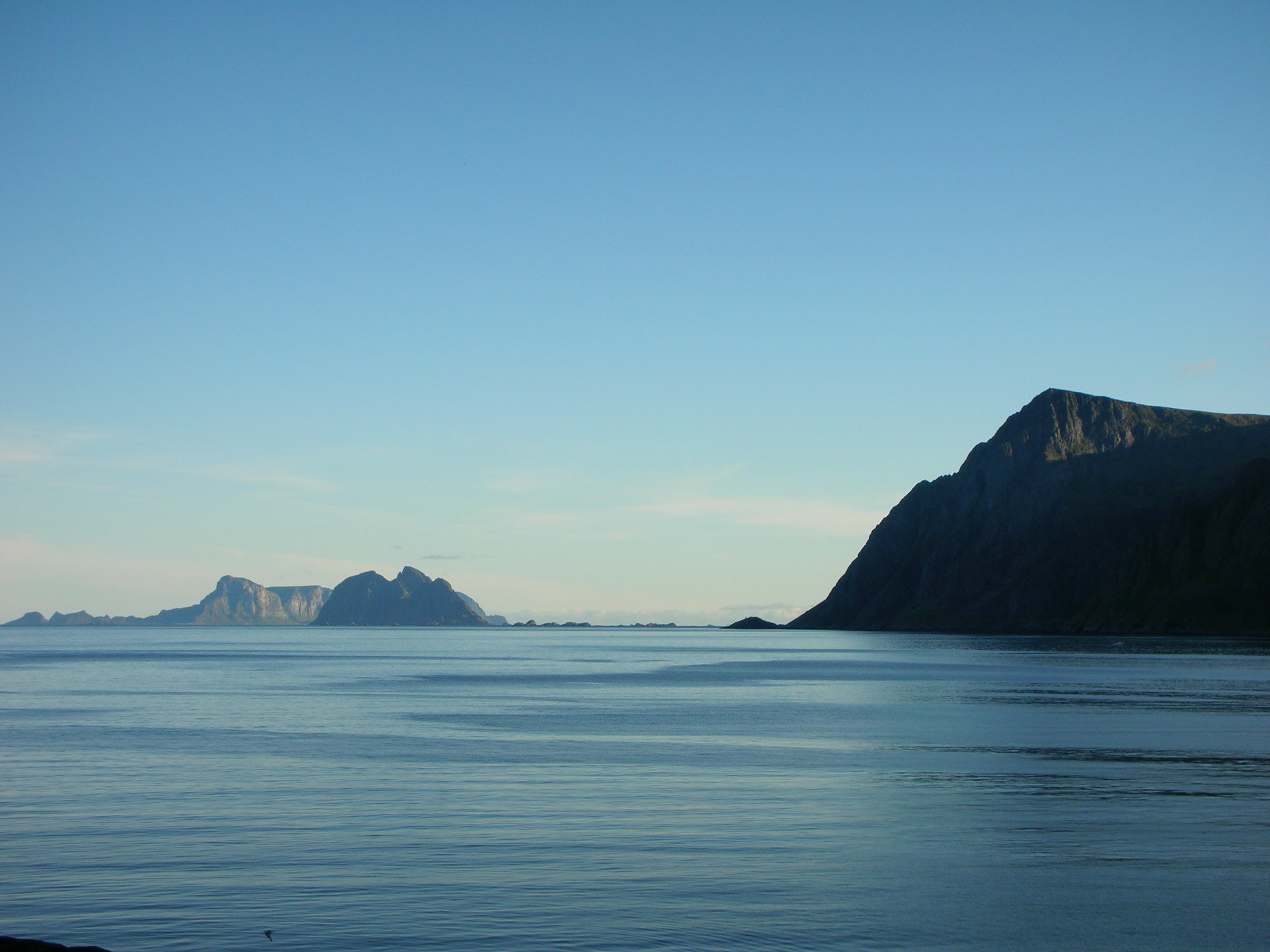
Moskenstraumen with Mosken and Værøy in the background and Moskenesøy to the right

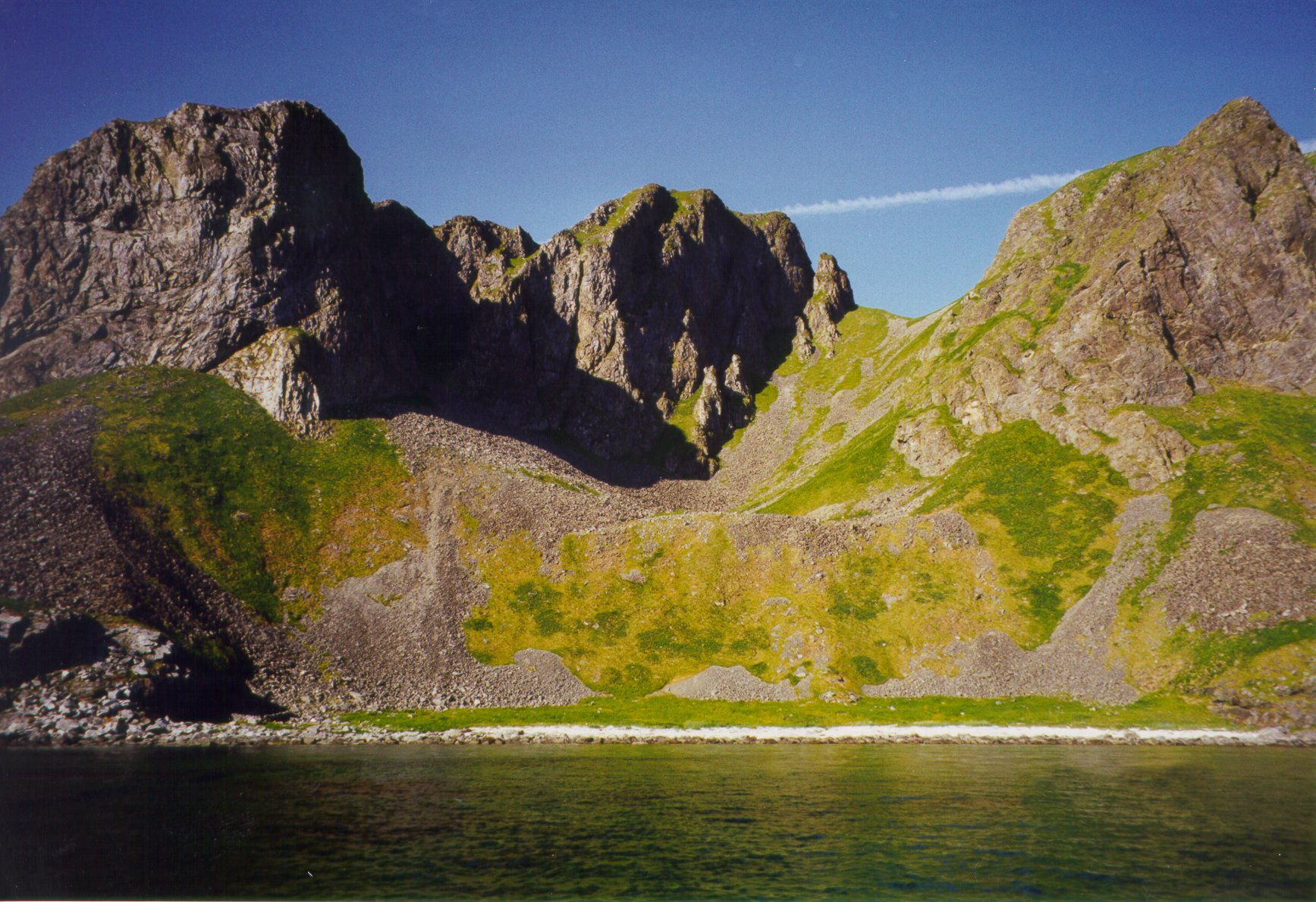
View of Mosken, seen from the sea

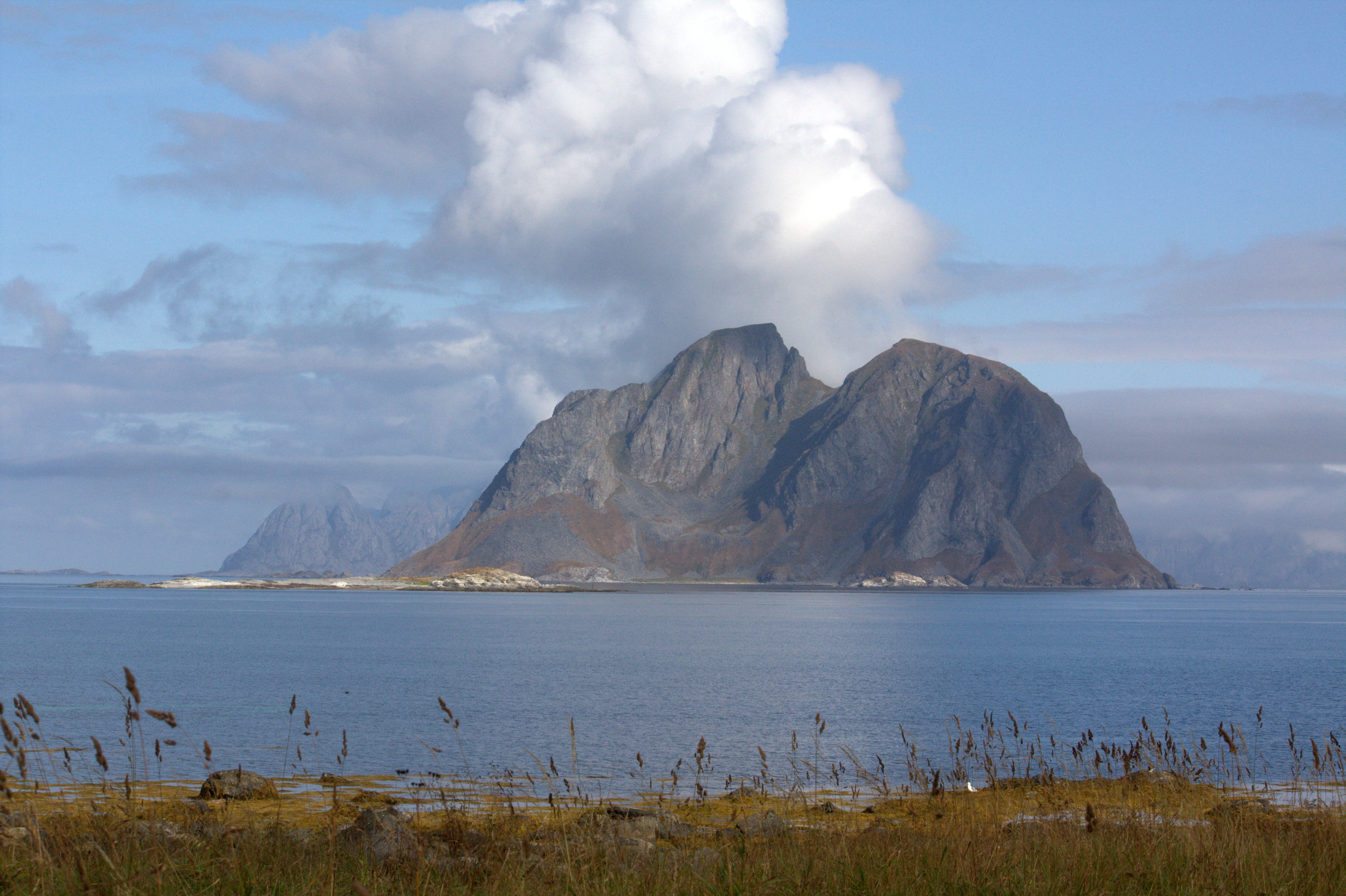
View of Mosken from Værøy, looking north

== See also ==
- List of islands of Norway
