= Haakon Storøy =

Norwegian politician

Haakon Storøy (February 21, 1907 – December 13, 1977) was a Norwegian editor and a politician for the Center Party.

Storøy was a farmer's son from the village of Lund in Kolvereid Municipality. After completing primary school, he worked as a cod fisherman and forestry worker before attending vocational school in Trondheim in 1924. He moved to Ofoten to manage a store, postal, and shipping office, and he began writing articles for the newspaper Ofotens Folkeblad. Some years later he became the travel secretary for the Norwegian Society for Sea Rescue, where he mostly worked winters for seven years and worked part-time at newspapers in the summers. Storøy was an editorial secretary for Namdalens Folkeblad in Namsos, the editor of Harstad Tidende from 1945 to 1946, and then the county secretary for the Norwegian Agrarian Association in Trondheim. Later he served as editor of the paper Nordtrønderen og Namdalen in Namsos for a number of years. In the 1950s and 1960s, he created several programs and feature contributions about Nord-Trøndelag and Namdalen for the NRK radio studio in Namsos, often together with Håkon Karlsen and Otto Nielsen from NRK in Trondheim.

Storøy was the primary deputy member of the Storting from Nord-Trøndelag from 1954 to 1961, and he attended 114 days. He also spent some time as a member of the Namsos municipal council.
