= Innherreds Avis =

Former Norwegian newspaper

Innherreds Avis (lit. 'The Innherred Gazette') was a short-lived Norwegian newspaper published in Steinkjer from December 2, 1933, to June 26, 1934. The editor for this entire period was Reidar Stavseth. Innherreds Avis was published twice a week and printed at Namdalens Folkeblad in Namsos, the company which also owned the newspaper. Its competitors were Nord-Trøndelag og Nordenfjeldsk Tidende and Inntrøndelagen.

The newspaper had its background in an expansion of the Namsos-based newspaper Namdalens Folkeblad. Established in 1896, it was struggling financially and was bought by the Conservative Party in 1931, with Reidar Stavseth as editor-in-chief. Shortly after, Stavseth bought the newspaper from the party. Competition was severe, with four newspapers serving the four thousand Namsos residents. Stavseth therefore expanded his operations south, and set up Innherreds Avis in Steinkjer. However, it failed to turn a profit, and was closed down after seven months of operations.
