= Moskstraumen =

Tidal whirlpool system at the Lofoten archipelago in Norway

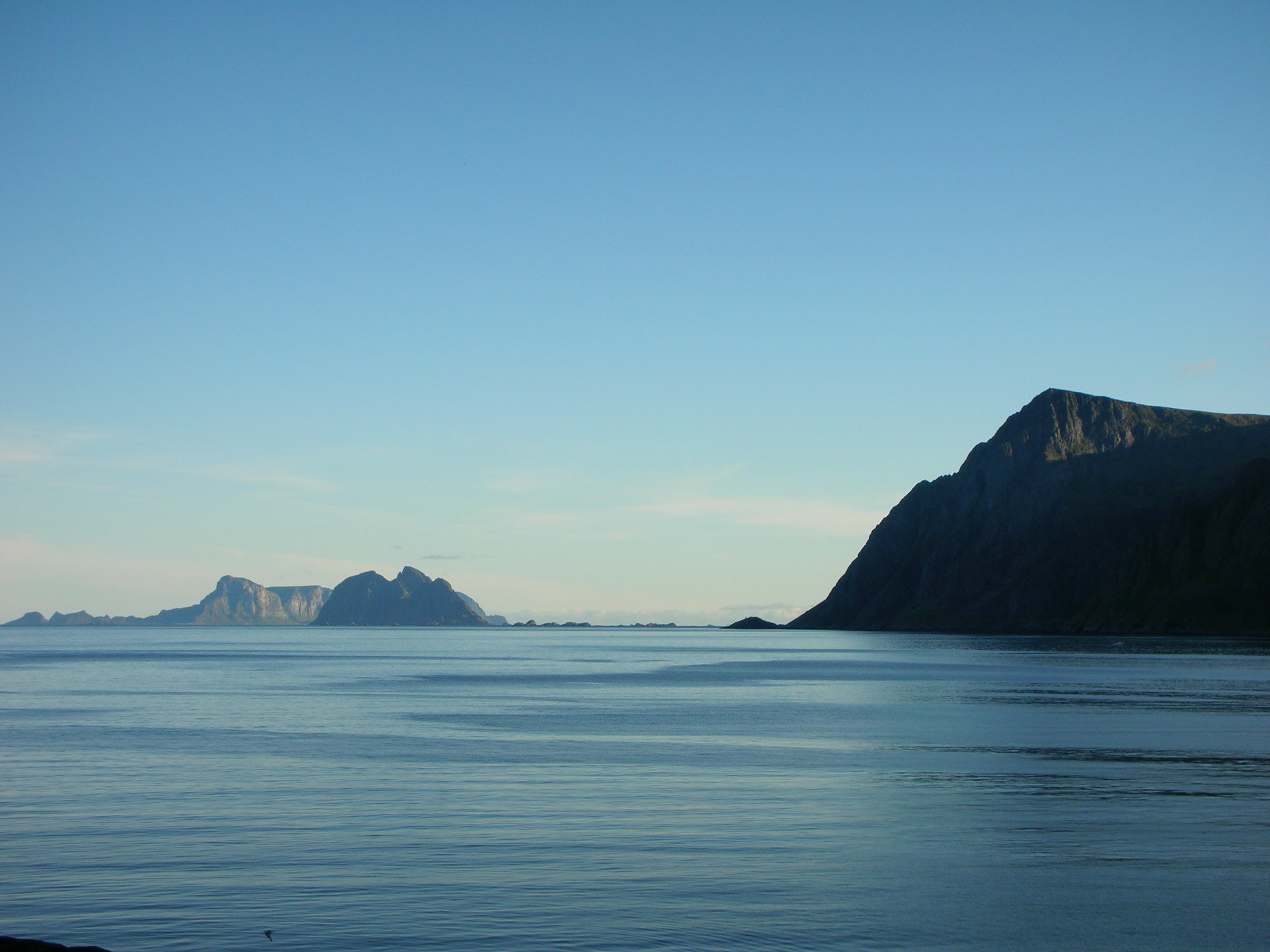
- Interactive map of the maelstrom location
- Location: Nordland county, Norway
- Coordinates: 67°48′N 12°50′E
- Type: Maelstrom
- Basin countries: Norway

Moskstraumen or Moskenstraumen, also known as the Lofoten maelstrom, is a system of tidal eddies and whirlpools, one of the strongest in the world, that forms at the Lofoten archipelago in Nordland county, Norway between the Norwegian Sea and the Vestfjorden. It is located between the Lofoten Point (Norwegian: Lofotodden) on the island of Moskenesøya (in Moskenes Municipality) and the island of Mosken (in Værøy Municipality). Moskstraumen is unusual in that it occurs in the open sea, whereas most other tidal flows are observed in confined straits or rivers. It originates from a combination of several factors, the dominant being the strong semi-diurnal tides and peculiar shape of the seabed, with a shallow ridge between the Moskenesøya and Værøya islands which amplifies and whirls the tidal currents.

Moskstraumen has been featured in many historical accounts, generally exaggerated. It is also popularly known as maelstrom – a Nordic word (malstrøm/malström) for a strong whirlpool which originates from the Dutch combination of malen (to grind) and stroom (stream). This term was introduced into the English language by Edgar Allan Poe in 1841, through his short story "A Descent into the Maelström". Poe provides an alternative name for the whirlpool with the line: "We Norwegians call it the Moskoestrom, from the island of Moskoe in the midway."

== Description and mechanism ==
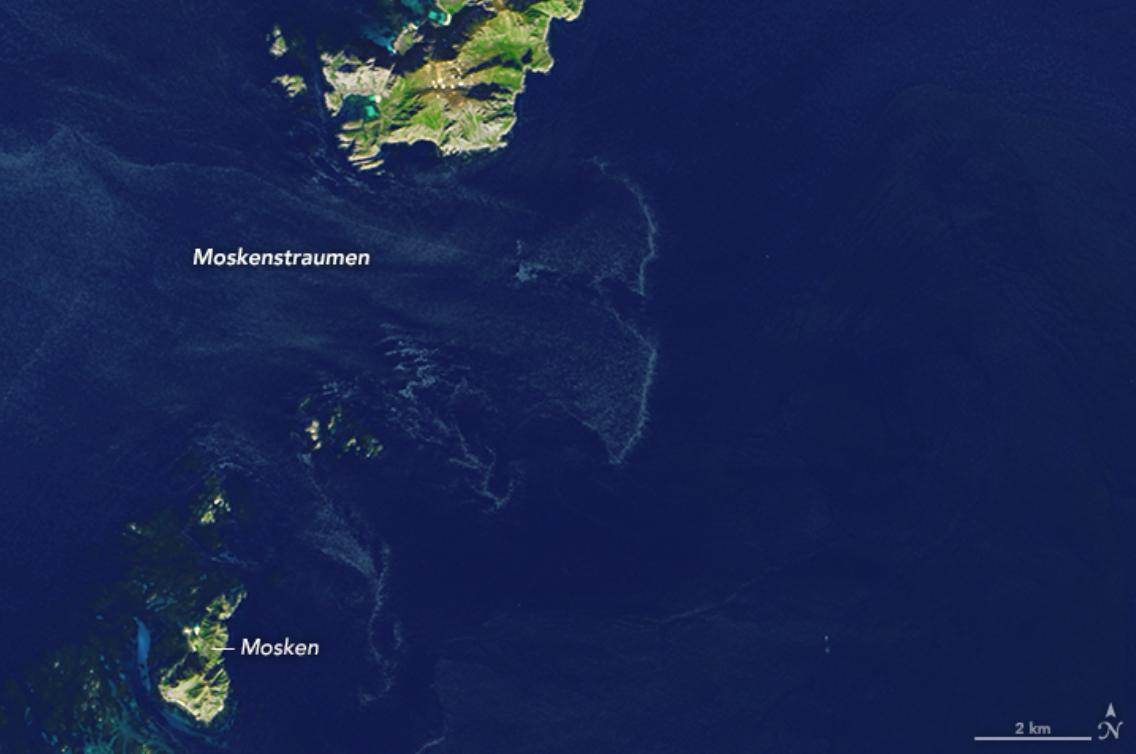
Moskenstraumen maelstrom from a NASA satellite image near Lofoten. Grey and blue-grey colors indicate rough seas.

Moskstraumen is located between the Lofoten Point of the island of Moskenesøya (in Moskenes Municipality) and the small island of Mosken in Værøy Municipality. It involves strong tidal currents flowing through the shallows between these islands and the Atlantic Ocean and the deep Vestfjorden, creating large, weak eddies and small whirlpools. In 1986, the Norwegian Hydrographic Service published a pilot book saying that currents could reach strengths of 5 metres per second, although a 1997 study found a maximum strength of 3 m/s and ship-based measurements in 1999 measured currents of 1.7 m/s.

Coat of arms since 1986 for Moskenes Municipality, a stylized view of Moskstraumen.

The currents are about eight kilometres (5.0 mi) wide and suck in various small organisms, thereby attracting fish and fishing boats, which could be in danger even in modern times. The flow currents are strongest around July–August. They can be clearly seen from a plane or the nearby 601-metre (1,972 ft) tall Lofotodden Hill on Moskenesøya. There are regular tourist boat trips between Moskenesøya and Værøya.

Moskstraumen is created as a result of a combination of several factors, including tides, strong local winds, position of the Lofoten and the underwater topography; unlike most other major maelstroms, such as Saltstraumen, Gulf of Corryvreckan, Naruto whirlpools, Old Sow whirlpool, and Skookumchuck Narrows, it is located in the open sea rather than in a strait or channel. Tides have an amplitude of about four metres (13 ft) and are semi-diurnal at Lofoten, meaning that they rise twice a day; they are the major contribution to Moskstraumen. Tides are combined with the northerly Norwegian Sea currents and with storm-induced flow to result in a significant stream, with a reported speed varying between the sources from about 11 to 20 kilometres per hour (6.8 to 12.4 mph) and above. This flow occurs at the significant depths of about 500 metres (1,600 ft). It then meets a ridge of only about 20 meters (66 ft) deep (other sources say 40–60 metres (130–200 ft))) at the chain of Moskenesøya, Mosken, and Værøy islands that causes an upward movement and eddies around the island edges.

== In literature ==
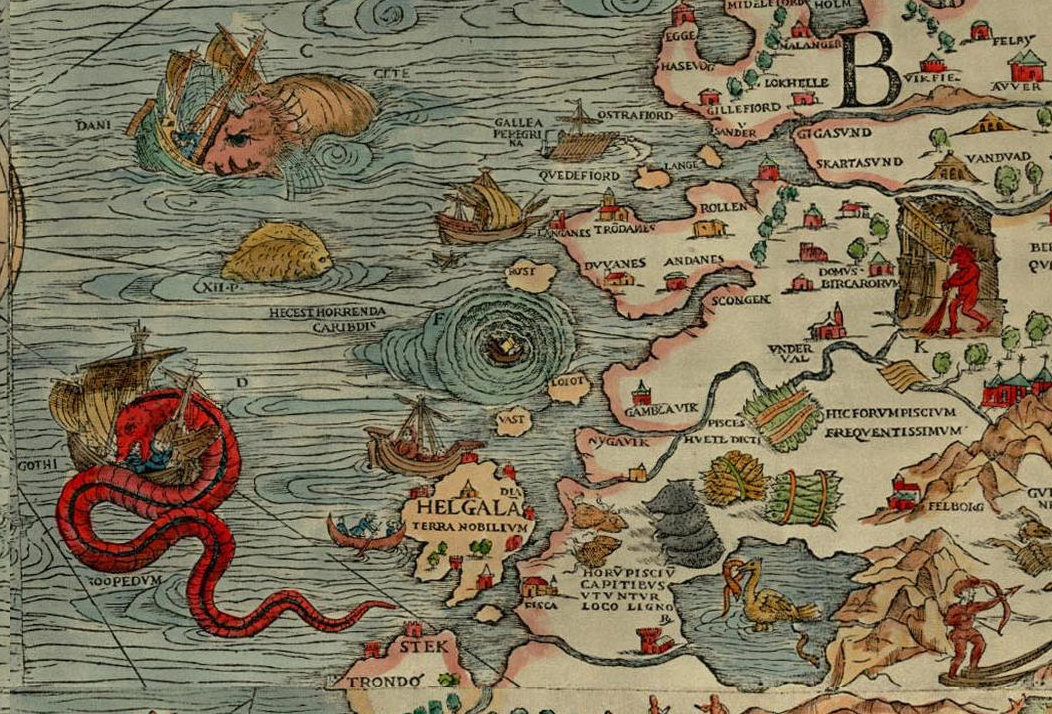
The maelstrom off Norway, as illustrated by Olaus Magnus on the Carta Marina, 1539.

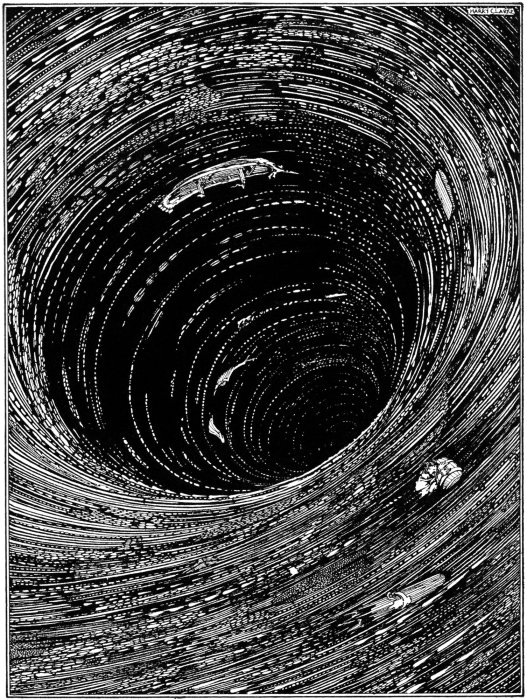
Illustration for Edgar Allan Poe's 1841 story "Descent into the Maelström", by Harry Clarke, 1919.

Moskstraumen was described in the 13th century in the Old Norse poems "Edda" and remained an attractive subject for painters and writers, including Edgar Allan Poe, Walter Moers, and Jules Verne. The Swedish bishop Olaus Magnus included Moskstraumen into his detailed report on the Nordic countries and their map, Carta marina (1539). He attributed the whirlpool to divine forces and mentioned that it was much stronger than the previously known Sicilian whirlpool Charybdis. Most other writers of the time believed that Moskstraumen played an important role in the ocean circulation, but, given a large number of tales and lack of scientific observations, grossly overestimated the size and power of the phenomenon. The Moskstraum, referred to simply as the Maelstrom, was the inspiration for Poe's short story "A Descent into the Maelström" (1841), which brought the term maelstrom, meaning strong whirlpool, into the English language. Moskstraumen also features in the climax of Jules Verne's 1870 novel Twenty Thousand Leagues Under the Seas and is mentioned by Captain Ahab in Herman Melville's 1851 novel Moby-Dick. A likely source of information on Moskstraumen for those writers was a fictional description of Moskstraumen by Jonas Danilssønn Ramus from 1715 which was translated into English and partly included into the 1823 edition of Encyclopædia Britannica. Poe quoted Jonas Ramus and Encyclopædia Britannica in his tale. Moskstraumen is visited by characters in Liu Cixin's Death's End, who made extensive references to Allan Poe. The whirlpool is used as a metaphor for black holes, specifically the fact that light cannot escape beyond the event horizon.

Rosa Arciniega's 1933 Spanish-language dystopian novel Mosko-Strom: El Torbellino de las Grandes Metrópolis references Moskstraumen. A. S. Byatt's 2001 novel The Biographer's Tale also features the Maelstrom prominently.

One of the first scientific descriptions of Moskstraumen was presented by the Norwegian priest and poet Petter Dass in his poem "The Trumpet of Nordland" (published in 1739) which included a versified topographical description of northern Norway. There he clearly related the whirlpool with tides by noting that it was the strongest at full and new Moon and the weakest at half-Moon. He also noted that since the large fjords of Moskenesøya had to be filled and emptied within 6 hours, the related water flow should create strong currents. Dass' novel was however not translated into English and remained unknown in Europe. The relation of Moskstraumen with the tides was further mentioned by A. Schelderup in an article which was likely written in the 1750s and published in 1824.

== In painting ==
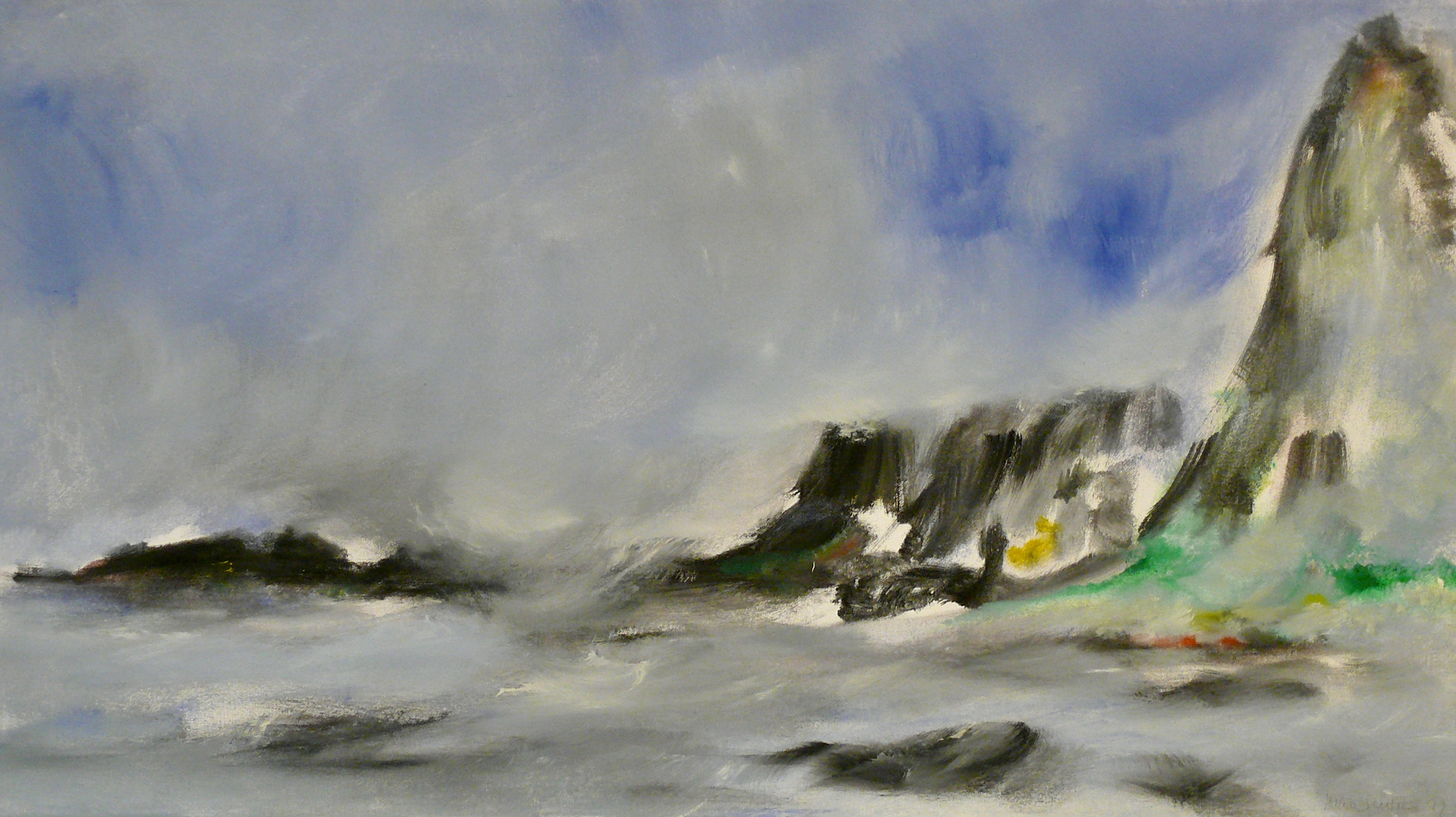
Moskstraumen I, oil painting by Ingo Kühl

In 1999 the German painter Ingo Kühl visited the Lofoten, set up a provisional studio in Reine in a rorbu and painted Moskstraumen.

== See also ==
- Lofoten Vortex
