= MS. Found in a Bottle =

Short story by Edgar Allan Poe

- Short story by Edgar Allan Poe
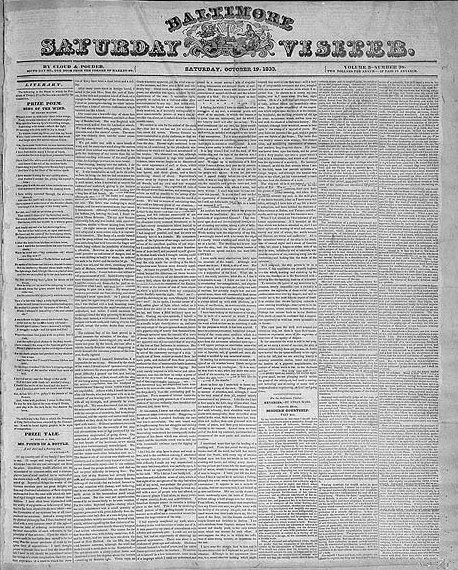
- Country: United States
- Language: English
- Genres: Adventure; Short story

Publication
- Published in: Baltimore Saturday Visiter
- Media type: Print (Periodical)
- Publication date: October 19, 1833

"MS. Found in a Bottle" is an 1833 short story by American writer Edgar Allan Poe. The plot follows an unnamed narrator at sea who finds himself in a series of harrowing circumstances. As he nears his own disastrous death while his ship drives ever southward, he writes an "MS.", or manuscript, telling of his adventures which he casts into the sea. Some critics believe the story was meant as a satire of typical sea tales.

Poe submitted "MS. Found in a Bottle" as one of many entries to a writing contest offered by the weekly Baltimore Saturday Visiter. Each of the stories was well liked by the judges but they unanimously chose "MS. Found in a Bottle" as the contest's winner, earning Poe a $50 prize. The story was then published in the October 19, 1833, issue of the Visiter.

== Plot summary ==
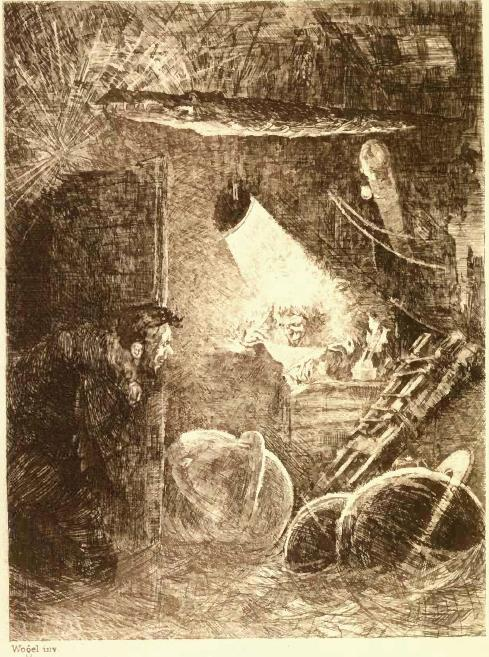
Illustration by "Wogel" for an early edition

An unnamed narrator, estranged from his family and country, sets sail as a passenger aboard a cargo ship from Batavia (now known as Jakarta, Indonesia). Some days into the voyage, the ship is first becalmed, then hit by a simoom (a combination of a sand storm and hurricane) that capsizes the ship and sends everyone except the narrator and an old Swede overboard. Driven southward by the magical simoom towards the South Pole, the narrator's ship eventually collides with a gigantic black galleon, and only the narrator manages to scramble aboard. Once aboard, the narrator finds outdated maps and useless navigational tools throughout the ship, the timbers of which seem somehow to have grown or expanded over time. Also, he finds it to be manned by elderly crewmen who are unable to see him; he obtains writing materials from the captain's cabin to keep a journal (the "manuscript" of the title), which he resolves to cast into the sea. This ship too continues to be driven southward, and he notices the crew appears to show signs of hope at the prospect of their destruction as it reaches Antarctica. The ship enters a clearing in the ice, where it is caught in a vast whirlpool and begins to sink into the sea.

== Analysis ==
"MS. Found in a Bottle" is one of Poe's sea tales (others are "A Descent into the Maelström" and "The Oblong Box"). The story's horror comes from its scientific imaginings and its description of a physical world beyond the limits of human exploration.

Biographer Kenneth Silverman wrote that the story is "a sustained crescendo of ever building dread in the face of ever stranger and ever more imminent catastrophe". This prospect of unknown catastrophe both horrifies and stimulates the narrator. Like Poe's narrator in another early work, "Berenice", the narrator in "MS. Found in a Bottle" lives predominantly through his books, or more accurately his manuscripts.

The otherworldly ship on which the narrator finds himself may evoke the legendary ghost ship, the Flying Dutchman. A number of critics have argued that the story's ending references the Hollow Earth theories propounded by John Cleves Symmes, Jr. and Jeremiah N. Reynolds. Symmes and Reynolds proposed that the planet's interior was hollow and habitable, and was accessible via openings at the two poles. The idea was considered scientifically plausible during the early 19th century. Poe also incorporated Symmes' theories into his later work The Narrative of Arthur Gordon Pym of Nantucket (1838), his only novel. Pym bears a number of similarities to "MS. Found in a Bottle", including an abrupt ending set in the Antarctic.

However, Poe's story may have been intended to poke fun at the more outlandish claims in Symmes' theory. Indeed, some scholars suggest that "MS. Found in a Bottle" was meant to be a parody or satire of sea stories in general, especially in light of the absurdity of the plot and the fact that the narrator unrealistically keeps a diary through it all. William Bittner, for example, wrote that it was poking fun specifically at Jane Porter's novel Sir Edward Seaward's Narrative (1831) or Symzonia (1820) by the pseudonymous "Captain Adam Seaborn", who was possibly John Cleves Symmes. It may be significant that the other tales that Poe wrote during this period, including "Bon-Bon", were meant to be humorous or, as Poe wrote, "burlesques upon criticism generally".

== Critical reception ==
The editors who first published "MS. Found in a Bottle" called it "eminently distinguished by a wild, vigorous and poetical imagination, a rich style, a fertile invention, and varied and curious learning." Writer Joseph Conrad considered the story "about as fine as anything of that kind can be—so authentic in detail that it might have been told by a sailor of sombre and poetical genius in the invention of the fantastic". Poe scholar Scott Peeples summarizes the importance of "MS. Found in a Bottle" as "the story that launched Poe's career".

The story was likely an influence on Herman Melville and bears a similarity to his novel Moby-Dick. As scholar Jack Scherting noted:

Two well-known works of American fiction fit the following description. Composed in the 19th century each is an account of an observant, first-person narrator who, prompted by a nervous restlessness, went to sea only to find himself aboard an ill-fated ship. The ship, manned by a strange crew and under the command of a strange, awesome captain, is destroyed in an improbable catastrophe; and were it not for the fortuitous recovery of a floating vessel and its freight, the narrative of the disastrous voyage would never have reached the public. The two works are, of course, Melville's Moby-Dick (1851) and Poe's "MS. Found in a Bottle" (1833), and the correspondences are in some respects so close as to suggest a causal rather than a coincidental relationship between the two tales.

== Publication history ==
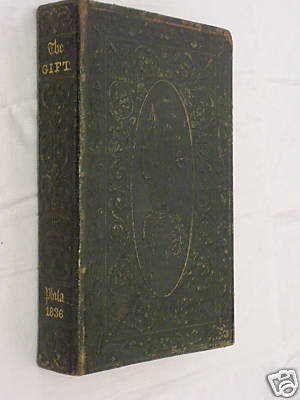
The Gift, Carey and Hart, Philadelphia, 1836

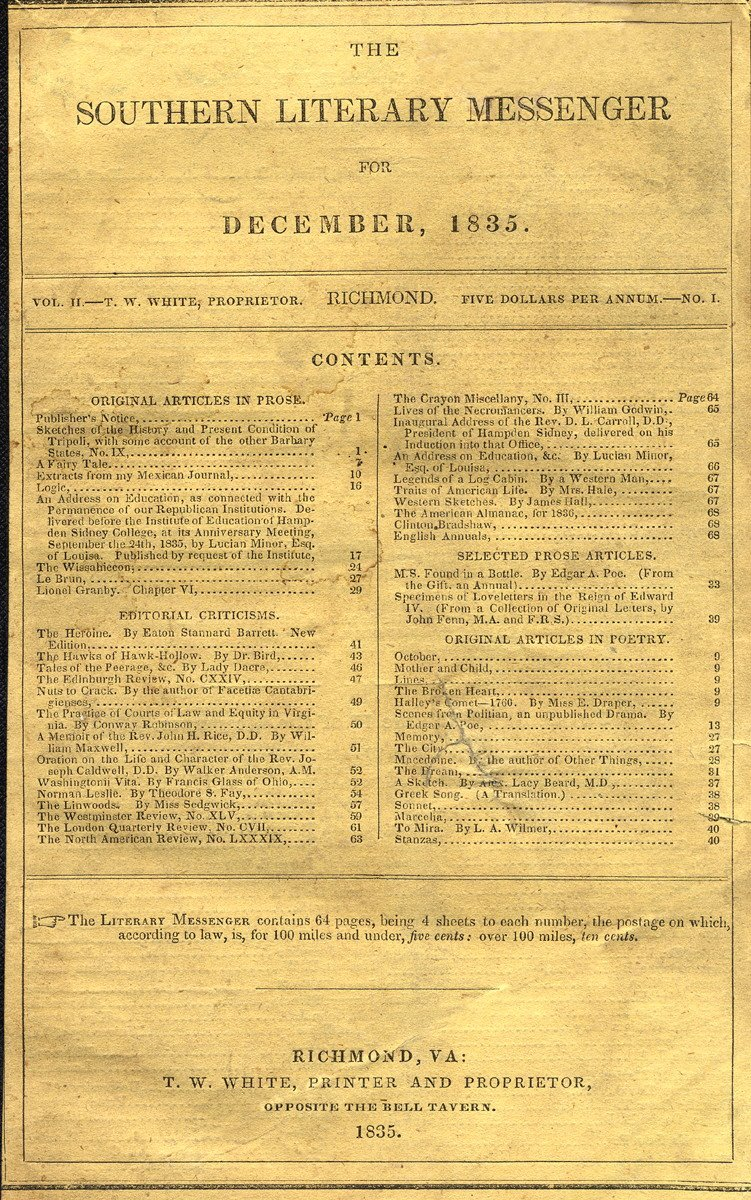
December 1835 issue of Southern Literary Messenger, featuring "MS. Found in a Bottle" (p. 33) and "Politian" (p. 13) by Edgar Allan Poe

In the June 15, 1833, issue of the Baltimore Saturday Visiter, its publishers Charles F. Cloud and William L. Pouder announced prizes of "50 dollars for the best Tale and 25 dollars for the best poem, not exceeding one hundred lines", submitted by October 1, 1833. Poe submitted "MS. Found in a Bottle" along with five others. The judges—John Pendleton Kennedy, James Henry Miller and John H. B. Latrobe—met at the house of Latrobe on October 7 and unanimously selected Poe's tale for the prize. The award was announced in the October 12 issue, and the tale was printed in the following issue on October 19, with the remark: "The following is the Tale to which the Premium of Fifty Dollars has been awarded by the Committee. It will be found highly graphic in its style of Composition." Poe's poetry submission, "The Coliseum", was published a few days later, but did not win the prize. The poetry winner turned out to be the editor of the Visiter, John H. Hewitt, using the pseudonym "Henry Wilton". Poe was outraged and suggested the contest was rigged. Hewitt claimed, decades later in 1885, that he and Poe brawled in the streets because of the contest, though the fight is not verified. Poe believed his own poem was the actual winner, a fact which Latrobe later substantiated.

Kennedy was particularly supportive of Poe's fledgling career and gave him work for the Visiter after the contest. He assisted in getting "MS. Found in a Bottle" reprinted in an annual gift book called The Gift: A Christmas and New Year's Present in its 1836 issue. Kennedy also urged Poe to collect the stories he submitted to the contest, including "MS. Found in a Bottle", into one edition and contacted publisher Carey & Lea on his behalf. A plan was made to publish the stories as a volume called Tales of the Folio Club, and the Saturday Visiter promoted it by issuing a call for subscribers to purchase the book in October 1833 for $1 apiece. The "Folio Club" was intended to be a fictitious literary society based on the Delphian Club that the author called a group of "dunderheads" out to "abolish literature". The idea was similar in some respects to The Canterbury Tales by Geoffrey Chaucer. At each monthly meeting, a member would present a story. A week after the Visiter issued its advertisement, however, the newspaper announced that the author had withdrawn the pieces with the expectation they would be printed in Philadelphia, Pennsylvania. Publishers Harper and Brothers were offered the collection but rejected it, saying that readers wanted long narratives and novels, inspiring Poe to write The Narrative of Arthur Gordon Pym of Nantucket, another sea tale.

After its first publication, "MS. Found in a Bottle" was almost immediately pirated by the People's Advocate of Newburyport, Massachusetts, which published it without permission on October 26, 1833.

In August 1835, Poe took a job as a staff writer and critic for the Southern Literary Messenger in Richmond, Virginia. That magazine's December 1835 issue carries a copy of "MS. Found in a Bottle" (see picture to the right).

== Bibliography ==
- Benton, Richard P. (1996). Carlson, Eric W. (ed.). A Companion to Poe Studies. Westport, CT: Greenwood Publishing Group. ISBN 9780313265068.
- Bittner, William (1962). Poe: A Biography. Boston: Little, Brown & Company. "ASIN B001HL5UTM"
- Carlson, Eric W. (1996). A Companion to Poe Studies. Westport, CT: Greenwood. ISBN 0-313-26506-2.
- Hammond, Alexander (1972). "A Reconstruction of Poe's 1833 'Tales of the Folio Club': Preliminary Notes". Poe Studies (1971–1985). 5 (2): 25–32. JSTOR 45296608.
- Meyers, Jeffrey (1991). Edgar Allan Poe: His Life and Legacy. New York: Cooper Square Press. ISBN 0-8154-1038-7.
- Peeples, Scott (1998). Edgar Allan Poe Revisited. New York: Twayne Publishers. ISBN 0-8057-4572-6.
- Poe, Harry Lee (2008). Edgar Allan Poe: An Illustrated Companion to His Tell-Tale Stories. New York: Metro Books. ISBN 978-1-4351-0469-3.
- Scherting, Jack (October 1968). "The Bottle and the Coffin: Further Speculation on Poe and Moby-Dick". Poe Newsletter. I (2).
- Silverman, Kenneth (1991). Edgar A. Poe: Mournful and Never-ending Remembrance. New York: Harper Perennial. ISBN 0-06-092331-8.
- Sova, Dawn B. (2001). Edgar A. Poe: A to Z. New York: Checkmark Books. ISBN 0-8160-4161-X.
- Stashower, Daniel (2006). The Beautiful Cigar Girl: Mary Rogers, Edgar Allan Poe, and the Invention of Murder. New York: Dutton. ISBN 0-525-94981-X.
- Thomas, Dwight; Jackson, David K. (1987). The Poe Log: A Documentary Life of Edgar Allan Poe, 1809–1849. Boston: G. K. Hall & Co. ISBN 0-8161-8734-7.
- Whalen, Terrance (1999). Edgar Allan Poe and the Masses: The Political Economy of Literature in Antebellum America. Princeton University Press. ISBN 0-691-00199-5.
