= Reidar Stavseth =

Norwegian newspaper editor and politician

- Born: May 21, 1907
- Died: April 12, 1991 (aged 83)
- Occupations: Newspaper editor, politician

Reidar Stavseth (May 21, 1907 – April 12, 1991) was a Norwegian newspaper editor and a politician for the Conservative Party. He served as editor for many different newspapers and is best known for being the editor-in-chief of Adresseavisen in Trondheim from 1969 to 1975. He belonged to a group of journalists with "a clearly conservative attitude and an academic education."

== Family and education ==
Stavseth was born and grew up in Trondheim, the son of the school principal Julius August Stavseth and his wife Rikke Thorland, both originally from Nærøy Municipality along the Trøndelag coast. He received his examen artium at Trondheim Cathedral School in 1927, a degree in economics at Royal Frederick University in 1929, and also attended a semester at the Norwegian Institute of Technology. In 1939 he married Ragnhild Julie Eik, a farmer's daughter from Borre Municipality. The couple's son Gunnar Stavseth is also a journalist and politician for the Conservative Party.

== Journalism and political work ==
Stavseth served as secretary of the Trondheim Riksmål Society before he became the editor of the newspaper Finnmarksposten in Hammerfest in 1930. One year later he became the editor of Namdalens Folkeblad in Namsos and was the head of the Norwegian Young Conservatives in Namsos from 1932 to 1934. He also published the short-lived paper Innherreds Avis in Steinkjer for less than seven months in 1933 and 1934. After that, he served as the editor of Møre Dagblad in Kristiansund from 1934 to 1935. In 1936 he became the travel secretary for the Young Conservatives in Vestfold, a position that he held for three years. At the outbreak of the Second World War, he was again in Møre county as chairman of the Ålesund Young Conservatives and as the editor of Aalesunds Avis, which was "published as one of the last free newspapers in Norway".

After Norway's liberation in 1945, Stavseth worked as the secretary for the Young Conservatives and as editor of its party newspaper, Unge Høire. A year later he moved to Bodø as county secretary for the Conservative Party's county branch and as editor of Nordlandsposten. Stavseth also served as the chairman of the party's Bodø branch from 1947 to 1949. He edited Fylkesavisen in Skien for some years until he returned home to Trondheim as co-editor of Adresseavisen in 1953. He was the chairman of the party's Sør-Trøndelag branch from 1958 to 1962. Stavseth concluded his career as the newspaper's editor-in-chief from 1969 to 1974.

Stavseth was a member of the Conservative Party's program committee in the Storting elections of 1945, 1961, 1965, and 1969. Among press organizations, he was director of the Association of Norwegian Editors from 1953 to 1955 and again from 1959 to 1970, and a member of the Daily Press Editor and Publisher Committee (DRU) from 1966 to 1970.

Stavseth published several works on local and business history.

== Bibliography ==
- 1941: Til heder for stripen i seilet. Ulabrands livssaga (In Honor of the Stripe in the Sail. Ulabrand's Life Story)
- 1943: Nordover med hurtigruten. Historie og hverdagsbilder gjennom femti år (Heading North with the Coastal Express. History and Everyday Images over Fifty Years)
- 1946: Arven fra Bjørn Farmann. Tønsberg Sjømannsforening gjennom 100 år (The Legacy of Bjørn Farmann. One Hundred Years of the Tønsberg Seamen's Association)
- 1951: Handelshuset J. M. Johansen gjennom 75 år (The J. M. Johansen Company: Seventy-Five Years)
- 1977: Avisen først og fremst – tilbakeblikk og randbemerkninger (The Newspaper First and Foremost: Recollections and Comments)
- 1981: Sjøbad og tradisjoner kysten rundt (The Seaside Resort and Traditions around the Coast)
