= Old Sow whirlpool =

Large whirlpool, New Brunswick, Canada

Coordinates: 44.923852°N 66.986561°W

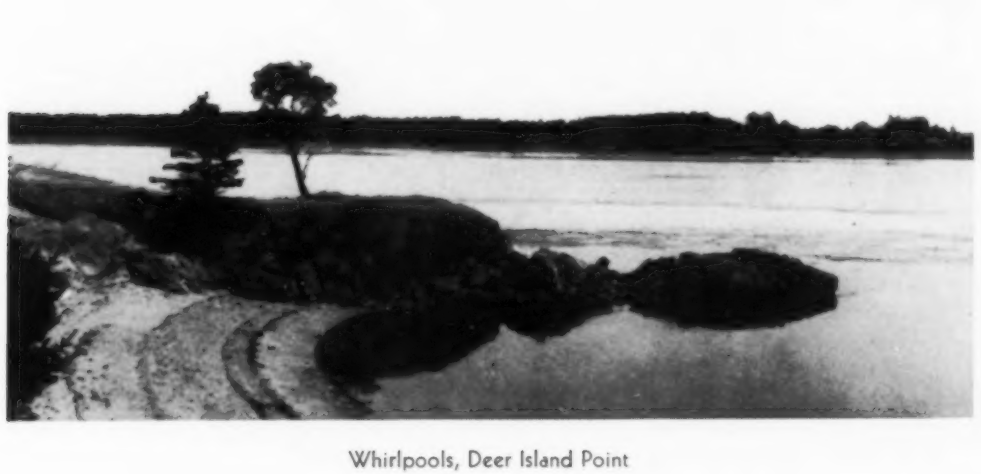
The Old Sow whirlpool in 1941.

Old Sow (Mocinikosk, in Maliseet-Passamaquoddy) is the largest tidal whirlpool in the Western Hemisphere, located off the southwestern shore of Deer Island, New Brunswick, Canada, and off the northeast shore of Moose Island, the principal island of Eastport, Maine. It is considered most visible and dangerous three hours after low tide.

The name has been in use since at least 1935. Local folklore claims that the name came about due to the similarity between the sound of its turbulent water and pigs eating from a trough.

== Origin ==
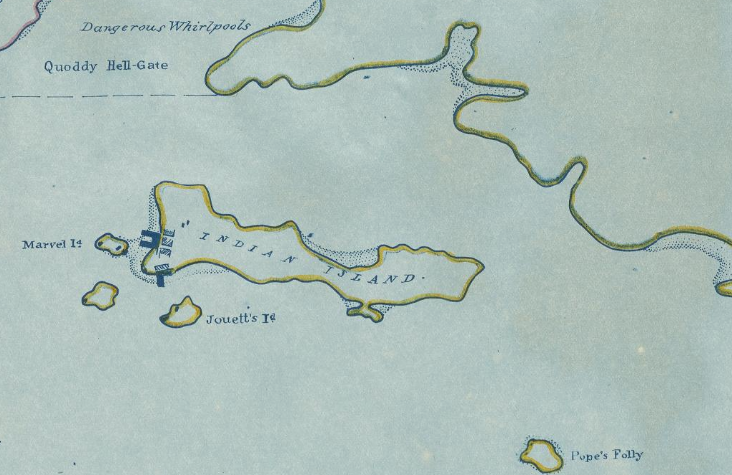
An 1830 map showed the "Quoddy Hell-Gate" of "dangerous whirlpools" off the southern tip of Deer Island.

The whirlpool is caused by local bathymetry and a 20-foot (6.1 m) tidal range where waters exchange between Passamaquoddy Bay and the Bay of Fundy, combined with the topography of the location's sea floor at the confluence of the numerous local currents through channels and over small sea mounts.

The whirlpools form in an area with a diameter of approximately 250 feet (76 m), as determined by the president of the Old Sow Whirlpool Survivors' Association in 1997 by way of an aerial photograph. The photograph was calibrated using the Deer Island Point Light beacon tower of known width that was included in the photograph.

Old Sow is one of five significant whirlpools worldwide (Corryvreckan, Scotland; Saltstraumen, Norway; Moskstraumen, Norway; and the Naruto whirlpools, Japan, are the others). Although the tidal currents within Western Passage surrounding Old Sow compare with faster whirlpools elsewhere, the speed of Old Sow's vortex is considerably slower than the Moskstraumen, the world's most powerful whirlpool.

Tremendous water turbulence occurs locally in the greater Old Sow area, but it does not usually constitute a navigation hazard for motorized vessels with experienced operators at the helm; however, small craft—especially vessels with keels (sailboats) and human-powered vessels—are warned to avoid these waters when the tide is running.

Besides Old Sow and its numerous "piglets" (small and medium whirlpools surrounding Old Sow), other area phenomena include standing waves, upwellings (that on rare occasion may even spout several feet into the air), and 10–17 feet (3.0–5.2 m) deep or more, circular and trench-shaped depressions in the water.

The failed Passamaquoddy Tidal Power Project/"Quoddy Dam" Project saw a series of tidal dikes constructed during the 1930s to connect Moose Island (Eastport, Maine) to Carlow Island (in Eastport), Carlow Island to Pleasant Point and to connect Treat Island (in Eastport) to Dudley Island (in Lubec, Maine). The changes in local water flow from the dikes reportedly reduced predictability of the "funnel" effect of Old Sow.

== Accidents ==
On March 28, 1830, a two-mast schooner was destroyed in the whirlpool drowning brothers Robert, James and William Stover whose widowed mother lived in Fairhaven.

Around 1912, Cecil Chaffee of Eastport drowned while rowing near the whirlpool.

In 1943 Eastport resident James Roland Mitchell Sr. drowned when the boom of his sailboat knocked him into the waters.
