= Harstad Tidende =

Norwegian daily newspaper

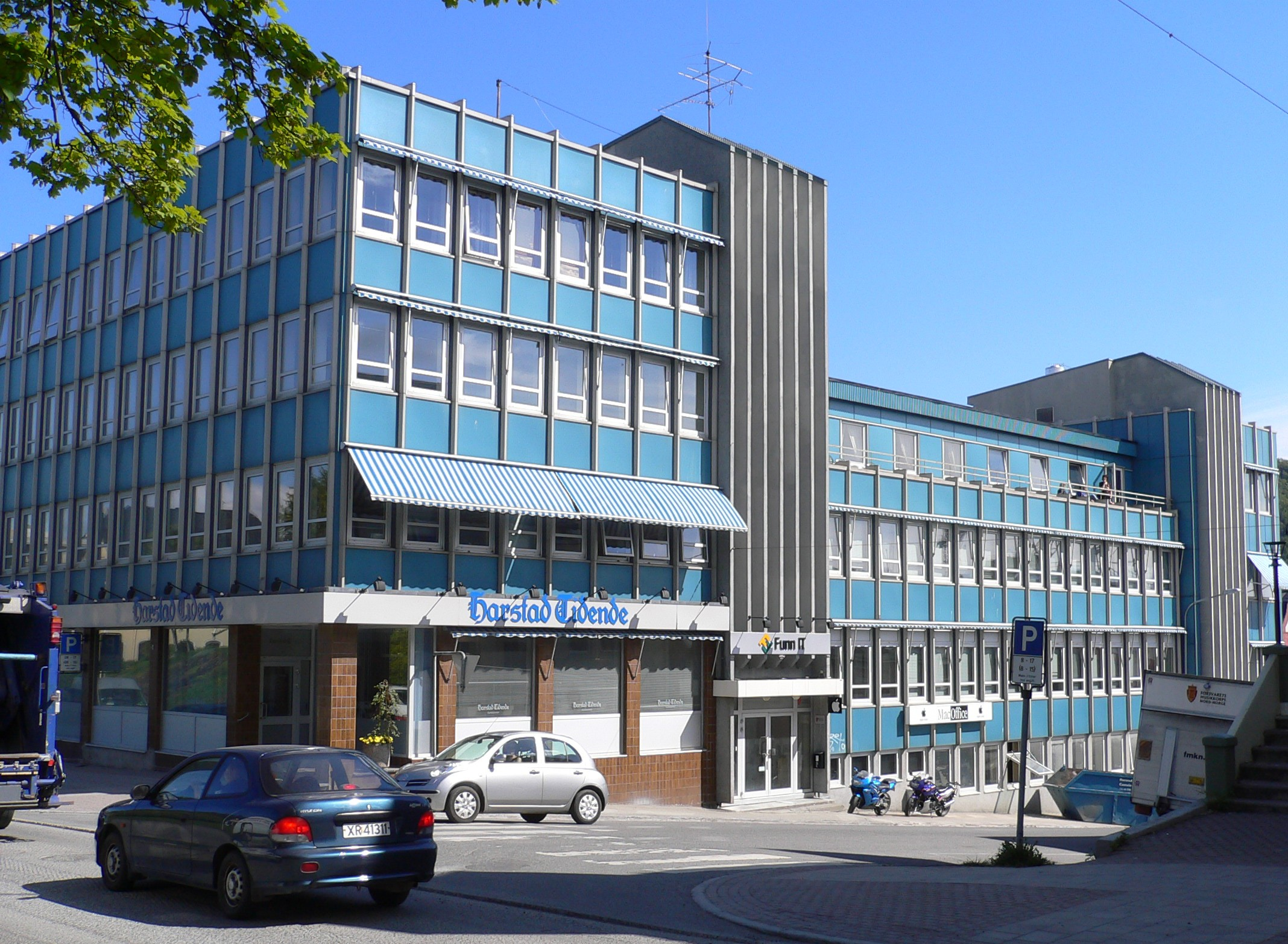
Harstad Tidende's building in Harstad

Harstad Tidende (meaning Harstad Times in English) is a daily, regional newspaper published in the city of Harstad, Norway. With a circulation of 13,503, the paper covers the municipalities of Harstad, Bjarkøy, Kvæfjord, Lødingen, Tjeldsund, Evenes, Skånland, Gratangen, Lavangen and Ibestad. The newspaper is owned by Harstad Tidende Gruppen, which is in turn owned by Polaris Media. The paper was edited by Haakon Storøy from 1945 to 1946.
