= Finnmarksposten =

Norwegian local newspaper

- Owner(s): Finnmark Dagblad/ A-pressen
- Editor: Sverre Joakimsen
- Founded: 1866
- Political alignment: Conservative
- Circulation: 1235
- Website: www.finnmarksposten.no

Finnmarksposten is a local newspaper published in Honningsvåg, Norway. It was established in 1866.

It has a circulation of 1235, of whom 726 are subscribers.

Finnmarksposten is owned by Finnmark Dagblad since 1993, which in turn is owned 100% by A-pressen.

Well known journalist Reidar Stavseth was also the editor of the newspaper in 1930.
