= A Descent into the Maelström =

Short story by Edgar Allan Poe

- Short story by Edgar Allan Poe
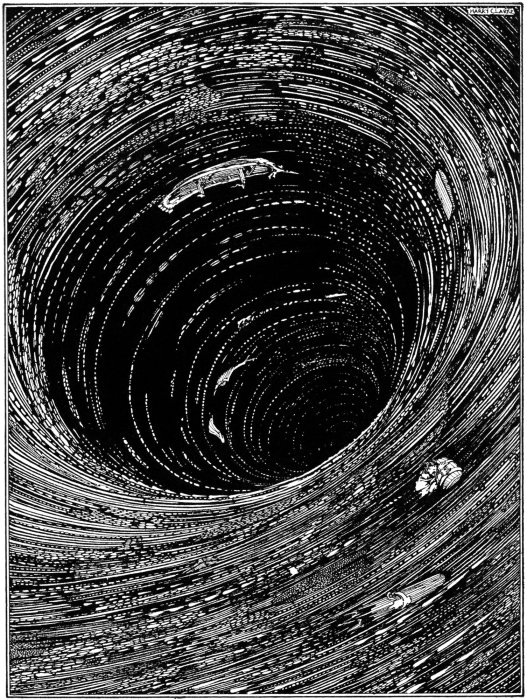
- Artist Harry Clarke's 1919 illustration for "A Descent into the Maelström"
- Country: United States
- Language: English
- Genre: Science fiction

Publication
- Publication date: 1841 (Graham's Magazine)

"A Descent into the Maelström" is an 1841 short story by American writer Edgar Allan Poe. In the tale, a man recounts how he survived a shipwreck and a whirlpool. It has been grouped with Poe's tales of ratiocination and also labeled an early form of science fiction.

== Plot ==
Inspired by the Moskstraumen, it is couched as a story within a story, a tale told at the summit of a mountain climb in Lofoten, Norway. The story is told by an old man who reveals that he only appears old—"You suppose me a very old man," he says, "but I am not. It took less than a single day to change these hairs from a jetty black to white, to weaken my limbs, and to unstring my nerves." The narrator, convinced by the power of the whirlpools he sees in the ocean beyond, is then told of the "old" man's fishing trip with his two brothers a few years ago.

Driven by "the most terrible hurricane that ever came out of the heavens", their ship was caught in the vortex. One brother was pulled into the waves; the other was driven mad by the horror of the spectacle, and drowned as the ship was pulled under. At first the narrator only saw hideous terror in the spectacle. In a moment of revelation, he saw that the Maelström is a beautiful and awesome creation. Observing how objects around him were attracted and pulled into it, he deduced that "the larger the bodies, the more rapid their descent" and that spherical-shaped objects were pulled in the fastest. Unlike his brother, he abandoned ship and held on to a cylindrical barrel until he was saved several hours later when the whirlpool temporarily subsided, and he was rescued by some fishermen. The "old" man tells the story to the narrator without any hope that the narrator will believe it.

== Publication history ==
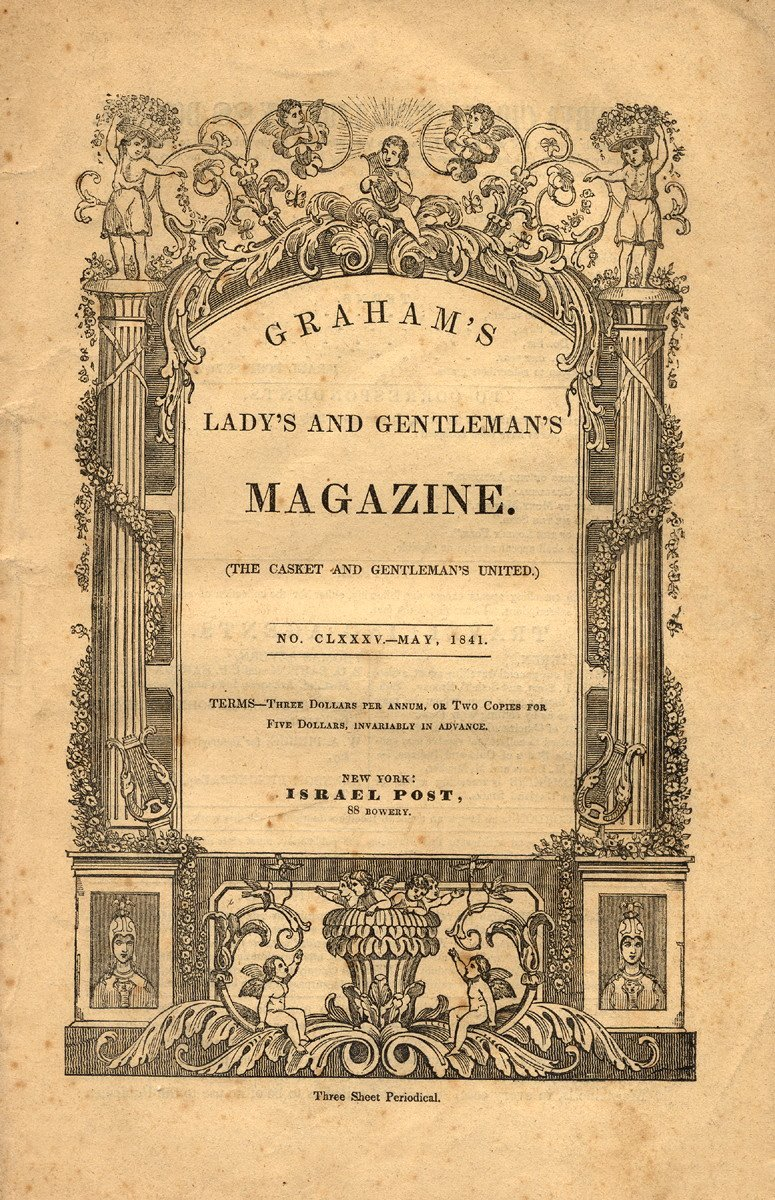
"A Descent into the Maelström" first appeared in Graham's Magazine, May 1841.

The story first appeared in the May 1841 edition of Graham's Magazine, published in April. Poe rushed to complete the story in time and later admitted that the conclusion was imperfect. Shortly after Poe's story "The Murders in the Rue Morgue" was translated into French without acknowledgment, French readers sought out other works by Poe, of which "A Descent into the Maelström" was amongst the earliest translated.

Like his other sea adventure works The Narrative of Arthur Gordon Pym of Nantucket and The Journal of Julius Rodman, "A Descent into the Maelström" was believed by readers to be true. One passage was reprinted in the ninth edition of the Encyclopædia Britannica—but it was based on a passage that Poe had lifted from an earlier edition of that same encyclopedia. In June 1845, "A Descent into the Maelström" was collected for the first time in Poe's Tales, published by G. P. Putnam's Sons Wiley & Putnam.

== Analysis ==
The story's opening bears a similarity to Samuel Taylor Coleridge's The Rime of the Ancient Mariner (1798): in both, an excited old man tells his story of shipwreck and survival. The tale is one of sensation, emphasizing the narrator's thoughts and feelings, especially his terror of being killed in the whirlpool. The narrator uses his reasoning skills to survive and the story is considered one of Poe's early examples of science fiction.

=== Major themes ===
- Ratiocination (see also "The Mystery of Marie Rogêt", "The Purloined Letter", C. Auguste Dupin)
- Sea tale (see also The Narrative of Arthur Gordon Pym of Nantucket, "MS. Found in a Bottle", "The Oblong Box")
- Story within a story (see also "The Oval Portrait")

=== Allusions ===
The story mentions Jonas Danilssønn Ramus, a man from Norway who wrote about a famous maelström at Saltstraumen. The opening epigraph is quoted from an essay by Joseph Glanvill called "Against Confidence in Philosophy and Matters of Speculation" (1676), though Poe altered the wording significantly.

== Critical response ==
Shortly after its publication, the April 28 issue of the Daily Chronicle included the notice "The 'Descent into the Maelstroom' [sic] by Edgar A. Poe, Esq., is unworthy of the pen of one whose talents allow him a wider and more ample range." Mordecai M. Noah in Evening Star, however, said the tale "appears to be equal in interest with the powerful article from his pen in the last number, 'The Murder in the Rue Morgue'". In 1911, Richmond professor Robert Armistead Stewart said the story was "the most enthralling of that trio of tales of pseudo-science that demonstrate Poe's wizard power" along with "MS. Found in a Bottle" and "The Unparalleled Adventure of One Hans Pfaall".

== Adaptations ==
In 1953, pianist Lennie Tristano recorded "Descent into the Maelstrom", inspired by the short story. It was an improvised solo piano piece that used multitracking and had no preconceived harmonic structure, being based instead on the development of motifs.

In 1968, Editora Taika (Brazil) published a comic adaptation by Francisco De Assis, with art by Edegar and Ignacio Justo, entitled "Descida No Maelstrom!" in Album Classicos De Terror #7. It was reprinted in Zarapelho #3 in 1976.

In 1974, Skywald published a comic adaptation by Al Hewetson in Psycho #18 with art by Cesar Lopez Vera. It was reprinted by Ibero Mundial De Ediciones (Spain) in Dossier Negro #66 (1974) and by Eternity Comics in Edgar Allan Poe: The Pit and the Pendulum and Other Stories #1 in 1988.

In 1975, Warren Publishing released a comic adaptation by Richard Margopoulos, with art by Adolpho Usero Abellan, in Creepy #70. This version has been reprinted multiple times.

In 1979, Crack released their first and only album, Si Todo Hiciera Crack, which included "Descenso en el Maelström," an instrumental track based on the short story.

In 1986, American composer Philip Glass was commissioned by the Australian Dance Theatre to write a piece inspired by the story.

In 1993, Novedades Editores (Mexico) published a comic adaptation in Clasicos De Terror #4, "Cayendo En El Maestrom". Adapter and artist are unknown.

== References in literary works ==
In 1962, British science fiction writer Arthur C. Clarke wrote the short story "Maelstrom II" inspired by Poe's story. It was first published by Playboy and can also be found in Clarke's anthology, The Wind from the Sun. The story is set in the orbit of the Moon rather than at sea.

In 1970, Czechoslovak writer Ludvík Vaculík made many references to "A Descent into the Maelström" as well as "The Black Cat" in his novel The Guinea Pigs. In Kurt Vonnegut's Player Piano, Paul Proteus thinks to himself "Descent into the Maelstrom" as he succumbs to the will of his wife. In Liu Cixin's Death's End, Poe and this short story are both referenced, and some of the characters visit Moskstraumen.

== Sources ==
- Bittner, William (1962). Poe: A Biography. Boston: Little, Brown and Company. ISBN 978-0-316-09686-7.
- Meyers, Jeffrey (1992). Edgar Allan Poe: His Life and Legacy (Paperback ed.). New York: Cooper Square Press. ISBN 978-0-8154-1038-6.
- Silverman, Kenneth (1991). Edgar A. Poe: Mournful and Never-Ending Remembrance (Paperback ed.). New York: Harper Perennial. ISBN 978-0-06-092331-0.
- Sova, Dawn B. (2001). Edgar Allan Poe A to Z: The Essential Reference to His Life and Work (Paperback ed.). New York: Checkmark Books. ISBN 978-0-8160-4161-9.
- Thomas, Dwight; Jackson, David K. (1987). The Poe Log: A Documentary Life of Edgar Allan Poe 1809-1849. New York: G. K. Hall & Co. ISBN 978-0-7838-1401-8.
- Tresh, John (2002). "Extra! Extra! Poe invents science fiction". In Hayes, Kevin J. (ed.). The Cambridge Companion to Edgar Allan Poe. Cambridge: Cambridge University Press. pp. 113–132. ISBN 978-0-521-79326-1.
- Vonnegut, Kurt (1952). "18". Player Piano. New York: Charles Scribner's Sons.
