= Gunnar Stavseth =

Norwegian journalist and politician

Gunnar Stavseth (born 2 April 1943) is a Norwegian journalist and politician for the Conservative Party.

His father, Reidar Stavseth was editor-in-chief of different newspapers through his career, and so Gunnar grew up in Trondheim, Bodø, Porsgrunn, and Tønsberg. His father too was a politician for the Conservative Party. Gunnar Stavseth graduated as cand.mag. from the University of Oslo, and later became a journalist in Adresseavisen and Aftenposten. He was later chief editor of Norges Industri, a magazine published by the Federation of Norwegian Industries, and of the Conservative Party Press Office (Høyres Pressebyrå).

While a student, Gunnar Stavseth was for a period chairman of the Conservative Students' Association, vice chair of Norwegian Students' Society and member of the editorial board of Minerva, a conservative magazine.

He served as a deputy representative to the Norwegian Parliament from Sør-Trøndelag during the term 1969–1973. In total he met during 20 days of parliamentary session.

He resides in Grav.
