= Naruto whirlpools =

Tidal whirlpools in the Naruto Strait in Hyōgo, Japan

Coordinates: 34°14′18″N 134°39′05″E

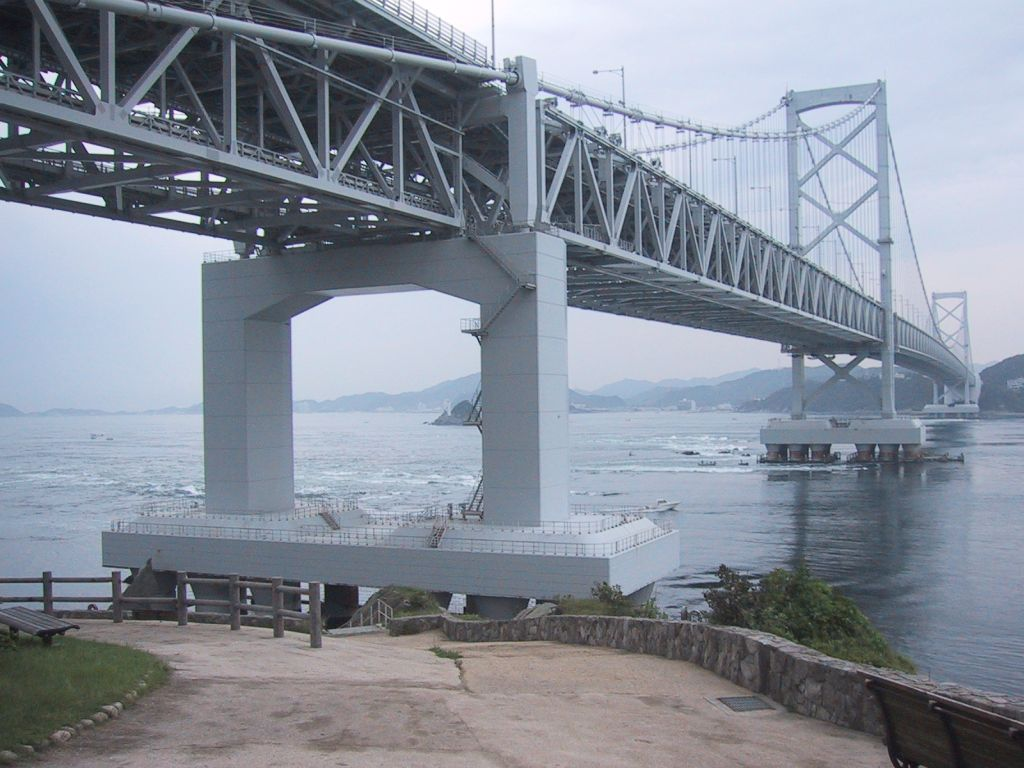
Naruto Strait, view from Awaji, with flow from the right, spanned by Ōnaruto Bridge

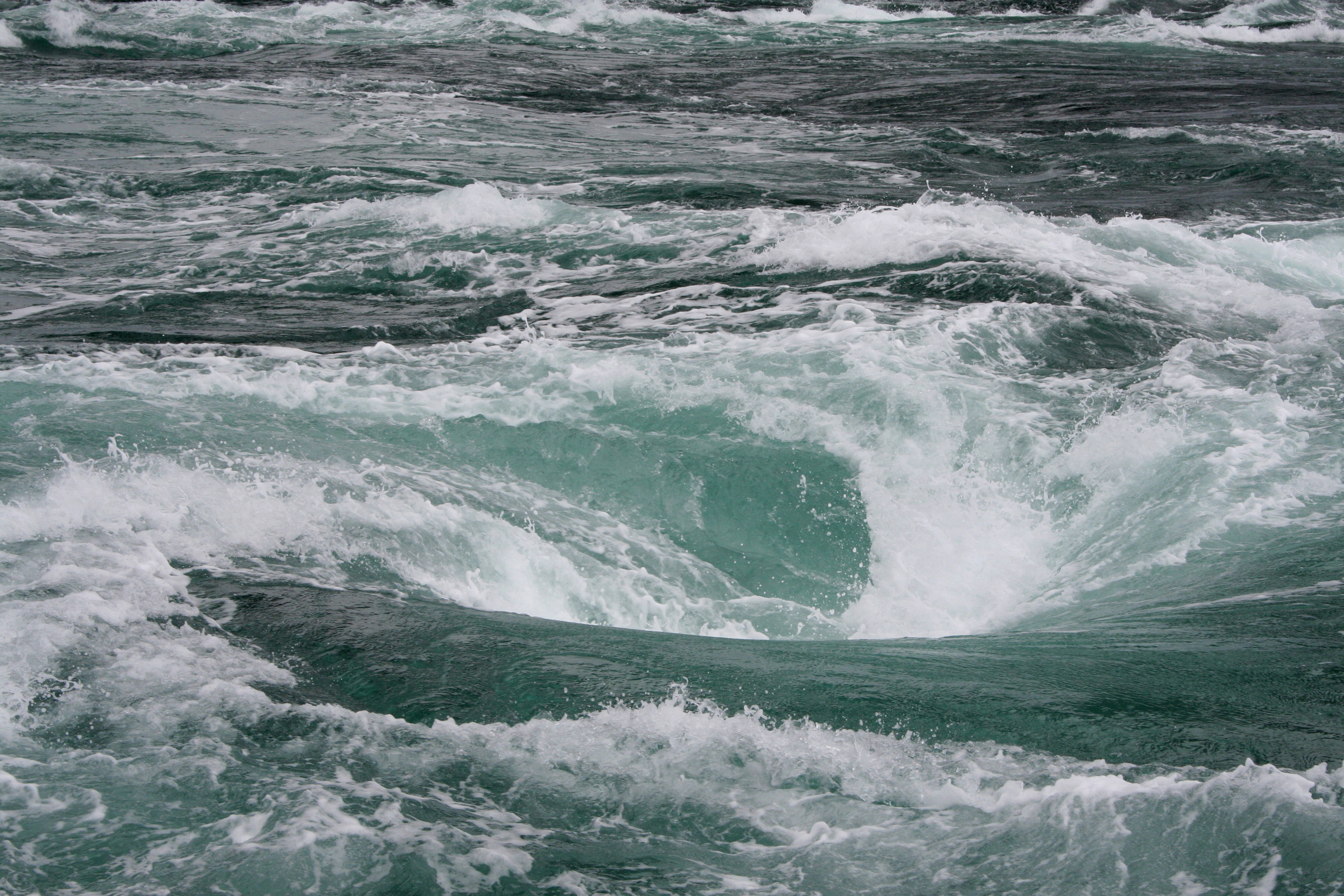
Naruto whirlpools as seen from a tourist boat

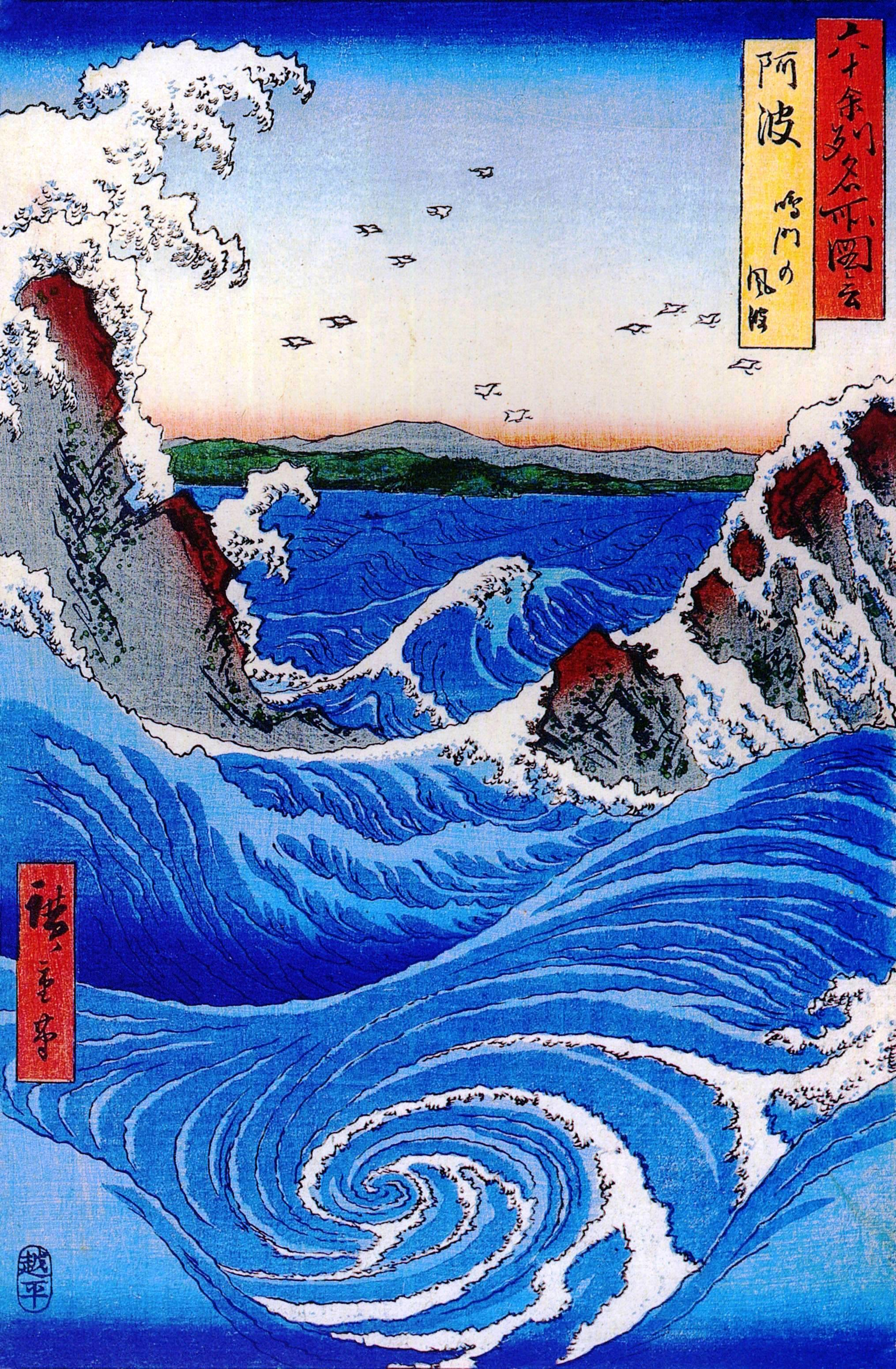
This Hiroshige ukiyo-e print shows a Naruto whirlpool.

The Naruto whirlpools (鳴門の渦潮, Naruto no Uzushio) are tidal whirlpools in the Naruto Strait, a channel between Naruto in Tokushima and Awaji Island in Hyōgo, Japan. The strait between Naruto and Awaji island has a width of about 1.3 km (0.81 miles). The strait is one of the connections between the Pacific Ocean and the Inland Sea, a body of water separating Honshū and Shikoku, two of the main islands of Japan. The tide moves large amounts of water into and out of the Inland Sea twice a day. With a range of up to 1.7 m (5.6 ft), the tide creates a difference in the water level of up to 1.5 m (4 ft 11 in) between the Inland Sea and the Pacific. Due to the narrowness of the strait, the water rushes through the Naruto channel at a speed of about 13–15 km/h (8–9 mph) four times a day, twice flowing in and twice flowing out. During a spring tide, the speed of the water may reach 20 km/h (12 mph), creating vortices up to 20 m (66 ft) in diameter.

The current in the strait is the fastest in Japan and the fourth fastest in the world after the Saltstraumen outside Bodø in Norway, which reaches speeds of 37 km/h (23 mph), the Moskenstraumen off the Lofoten islands in Norway (the original maelstrom) reaching 27.8 km/h (17.3 mph); and the Old Sow whirlpool in New Brunswick, Canada with up to 27.6 km/h (17.1 mph).

The whirlpools can be observed from the shore on Awaji island, from tourist ships, or from the Uzunomichi Walkway of the 1985 Ōnaruto Bridge spanning the strait. The suspension bridge has a total length of 1,629 m (5,344 ft), with the center span over the strait having a length of 876 m (2,874 ft) and a height of 41 m (135 ft) above sea level.

The whirlpools inspired the name for narutomaki surimi. Franziska Ehmcke, professor of Japanese studies at Cologne University, theorized that they also inspired the name of Naruto Uzumaki from the manga and anime Naruto, "Uzumaki" (うずまき) meaning "whirlpool". The storyline starts with building the Ōnaruto Bridge (大鳴門橋, Ōnaruto-kyō) into The Land of Waves (波の国, Nami no Kuni) which is based on the Ōnaruto Bridge spanning the Naruto Strait.

== See also ==
- Tourism in Japan
- Narutomaki
