= Nordtrønderen og Namdalen =

Former Norwegian newspaper

Nordtrønderen og Namdalen was a Norwegian newspaper published in Namsos from 1942 to 1994.

It was the result of a merger between three previous newspapers. The newspaper Namdalen was published in Namsos from 1899 to 1942, for the first 20 years under the name Namdalens blad. The newspaper Nordtrønderen was published in Namsos from 1883 to 1942. From February 1944 until May 1945 it was published under the name Fellesavisen Nordtrønderen og Namdalen. The newspaper Namdalens Folkeblad was taken over by Nordtrønderen og Namdalen in 1964, which then changed its name to Fellesavisa. The newspaper reverted to its original name in 1978.

The newspaper was not discontinued during the Second World War, and after the war it had twice the circulation as its competitor Namdal Arbeiderblad. By 1966, Namdal Arbeiderblad had a circulation of 4,382, whereas Nordtrønderen og Namdalen had a circulation of 5,957. Twenty-five years later, in 1991, Namdal Arbeiderblad was three times the size of its competitor. In its last years, the newspaper was published as a local version of Trønder-Avisa with much shared material.
