= Trondheim Cathedral School =

Coordinates: 63.4286°N 10.3961°E

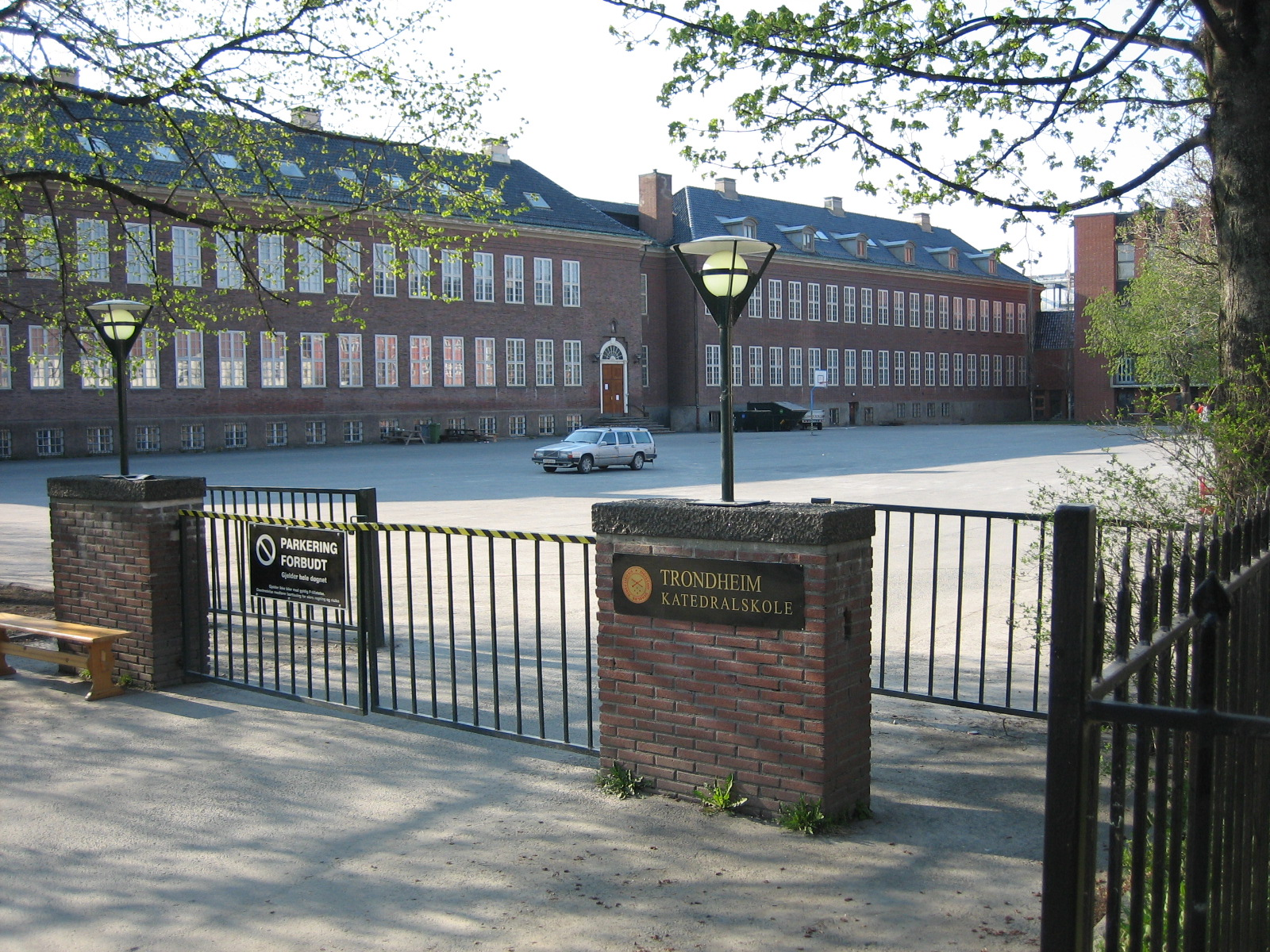

Information
- Established: 1152; 874 years ago
- Head of school: Tor Bitustøyl
- Staff: 100
- Enrollment: 596
- Website: https://web.trondelagfylke.no/trondheim-katedralskole

Trondheim Cathedral School (Norwegian: Trondheim katedralskole, Latin: Schola Cathedralis Nidrosiensis) is an upper secondary school located next to the Nidaros Cathedral in the center of Trondheim, Norway. The school has an enrollment of 596 and the current Head of school is Tor Bitusøyl.

== History ==
There is great dispute regarding the actual founding date of the Trondheim Cathedral, but the most common theory is that the school was founded in approximately 1152 and is hence the oldest school in Norway. The oldest part of the present school is the Harsdorff building (Munkegata 8), which was completed in 1786. The building is named after its designer Caspar Harsdorff, a royal Danish architect. Originally though, the school's design was submitted by a local architect/organist/fireman, but upon review by the Danish king it was turned down and his royal architect assigned with designing the school. It was funded by Thomas Angell (1692–1767), a Trondheim merchant. Festival Hall on the second floor has two marble reliefs by noted Danish sculptor Bertel Thorvaldsen (1770–1844). In 1920, the school underwent a major expansion, with buildings designed by Norwegian architect Carl J. Moe (1889–1942).

== Programs ==
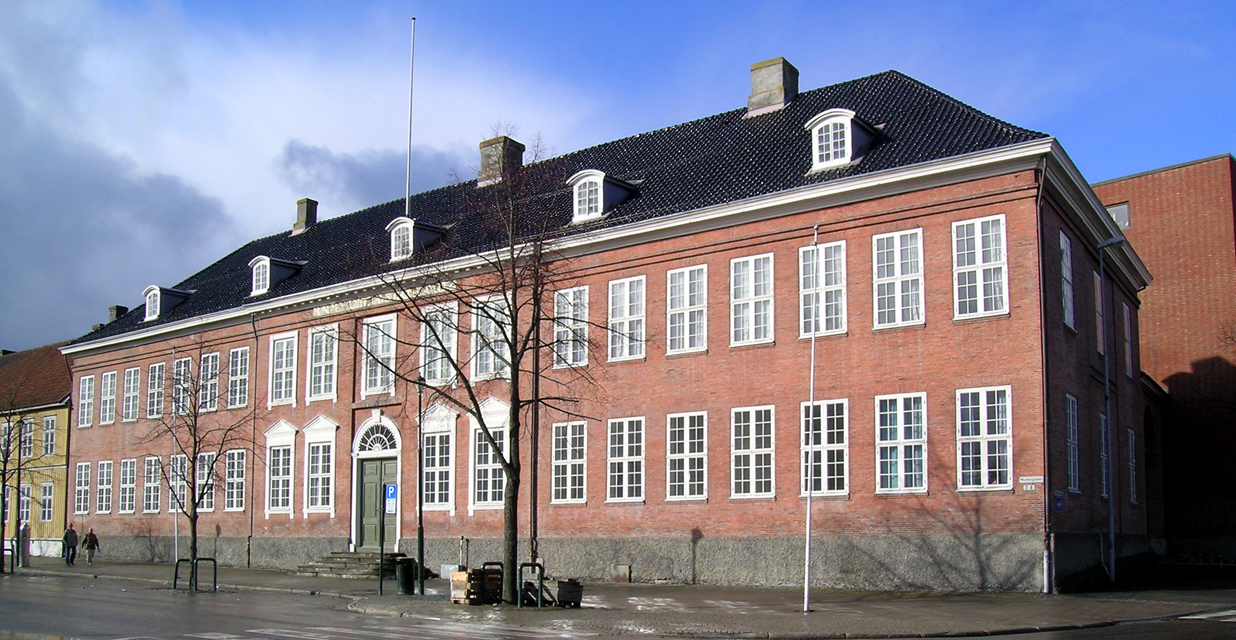
Trondheim Cathedral School

Trondheim Cathedral School offers three programs: study specialized education programs, education programs for music, dance and drama as well as media and communication. The school has a separate dance and music program, offers Latin courses and the IB Diploma course for local students who want to travel abroad or for international students who move to the city. The school is part of UNESCO's Associated Schools Project Network (ASPnet.) In addition, the school has an international program, where the study course is structured so that students take the first and the third school year at Trondheim Cathedral School, while they take their second school year in Norfolk, England.

== Notable alumni ==
- Håkon Håkonson (1204–1263), king of Norway
- Peter Wessel Tordenskiold (1690–1720), naval hero
- Gerhard Schøning (1722–1780), Norwegian historian
- Johan Nordahl Brun (1745–1816), bishop and poet
- Gabriel Kielland (1871–1960), architect, painter, and designer
- Carl Gustav Fleischer (1883–1942), general during World War II
- Martin Linge (1894–1941), officer during World War II
- Reidar Stavseth (1907–1991), editor and politician
- Gudmund Hernes (born 1941), politician
- Idun Reiten (born 1942), mathematician
- Odd Einar Dørum (born 1943), politician
- Jon Bing (1944–2014), writer
- Sigurd Allern (born 1946), professor of journalism
- Trond Giske (born 1966), politician
- Erlend Loe (born 1969), novelist
- Snorre Valen (born 1984), politician

== See also ==
- List of the oldest schools in the world
