= Namdalens Folkeblad =

Norwegian local newspaper

Namdalens Folkeblad (transl. The Namdalen People's Gazette) was a Norwegian newspaper published in Namsos from 1899 to 1942 and from 1945 to 1963.

The newspaper was a continuation of the periodical Gjallarhorn. The newspaper presented itself from 1899 to 1926 as "a temperance, news, and advertising paper; an entertainment paper for the home." The newspaper was taken over by Nordtrønderen og Namdalen in 1964.

Editors of the paper included Ludvig Larssen, Reidar Stavseth, and Haakon Storøy.
