= Whirlpool =

Body of rotating water produced by the meeting of opposing currents

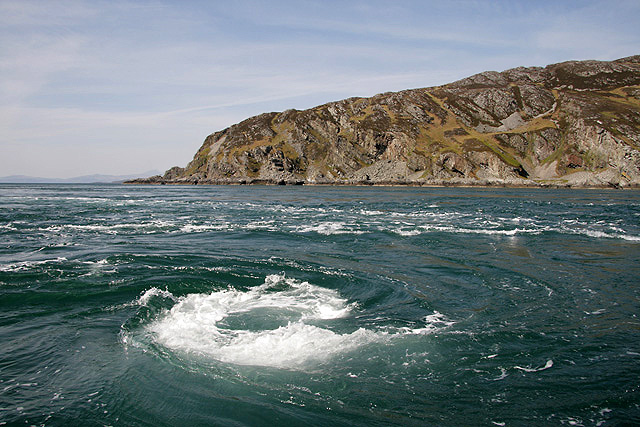
The Gulf of Corryvreckan whirlpool in Scotland is the third-largest whirlpool in the world.

A whirlpool is a body of rotating water produced by opposing currents or a current running into an obstacle. Miniature whirlpools form when a bath or a sink is draining. More powerful ones formed in seas or oceans may be called maelstroms (/ˈmeɪlstrɒm, -rəm/ MAYL-strom, -strəm). Vortex is the proper term for a whirlpool that has a downdraft.

In narrow ocean straits with fast flowing water, whirlpools are often caused by tides. Many stories tell of ships being sucked into a maelstrom, although only smaller craft are actually in danger. Small whirlpools appear at river rapids and can be observed downstream of artificial structures such as weirs and dams. Large cataracts, such as Niagara Falls, produce strong whirlpools.

== Etymology ==
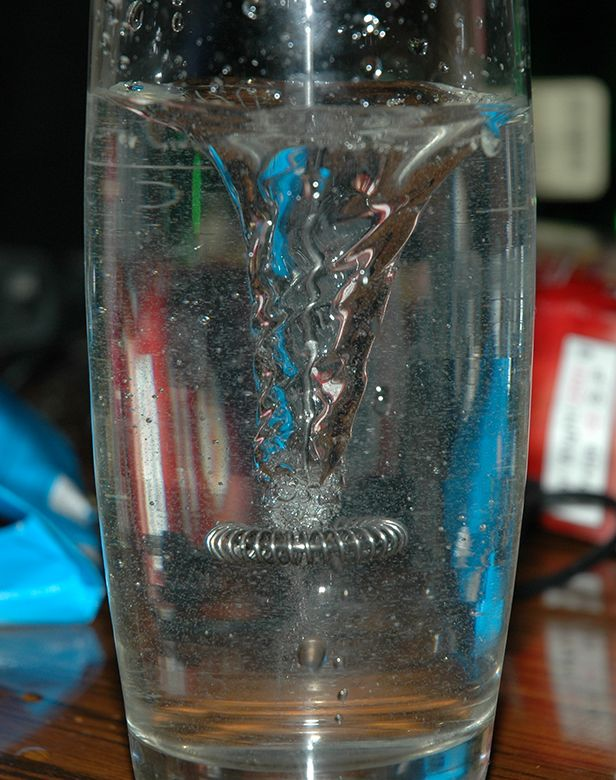
A whirlpool in a glass of water

One of the earliest uses in English of the Scandinavian word malström or malstrøm was by Edgar Allan Poe in his short story "A Descent into the Maelström" (1841). The Nordic word itself is derived from the Dutch word maelstrom (pronounced [ˈmaːlstroːm]; modern spelling maalstroom), from malen ('to mill' or 'to grind') and stroom ('stream'), to form the meaning 'grinding current' or literally 'mill-stream', in the sense of milling (grinding) grain.

== Notable whirlpools ==
=== Saltstraumen ===
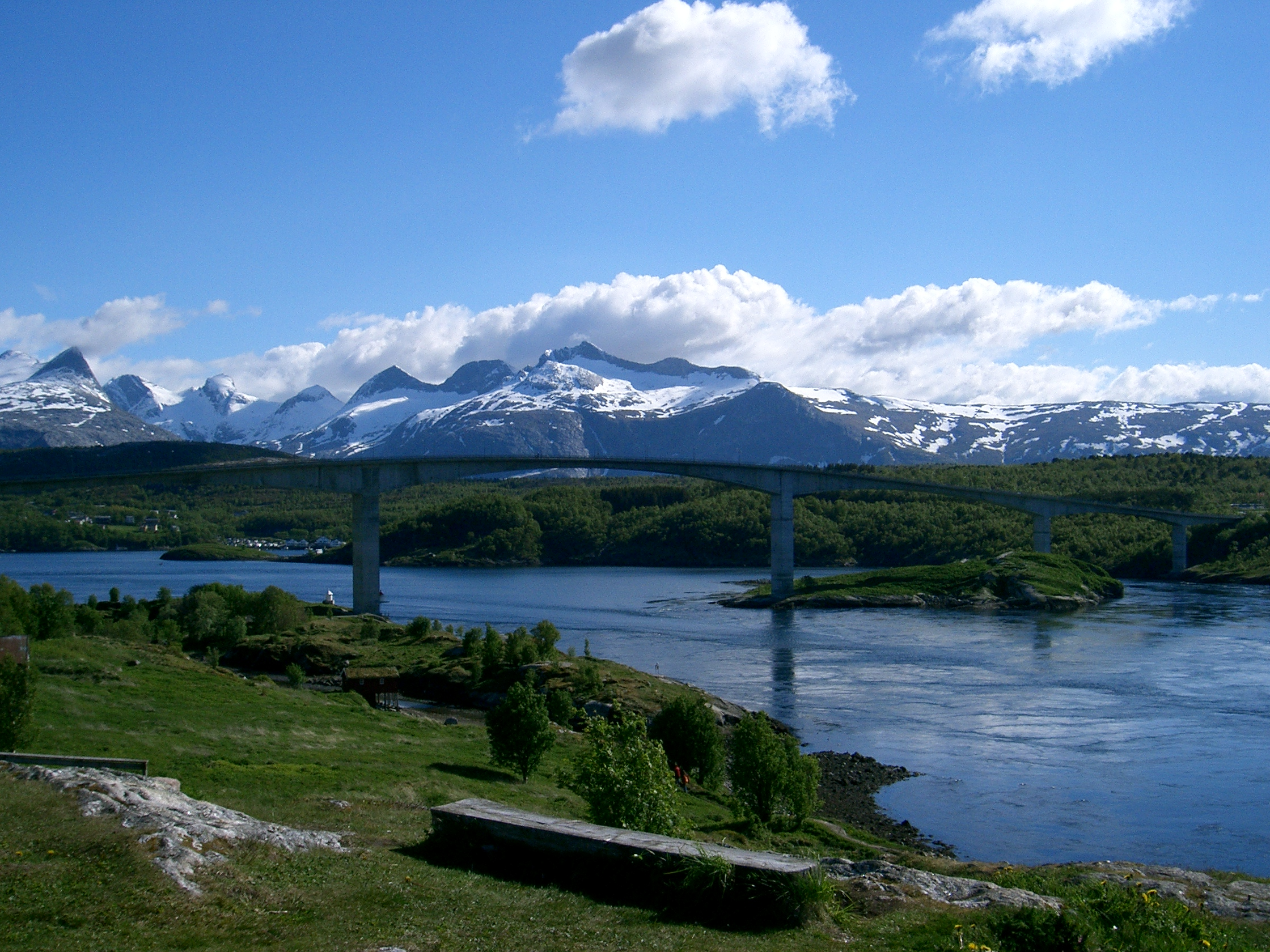
Saltstraumen

Saltstraumen is a narrow strait located close to the Arctic Circle, 33 km (20 mi) south-east of the city of Bodø, Norway. It has one of the strongest tidal currents in the world. Whirlpools up to 10 metres (33 ft) in diameter and 5 metres (16 ft) in depth are formed when the current is at its strongest.

=== Moskstraumen ===
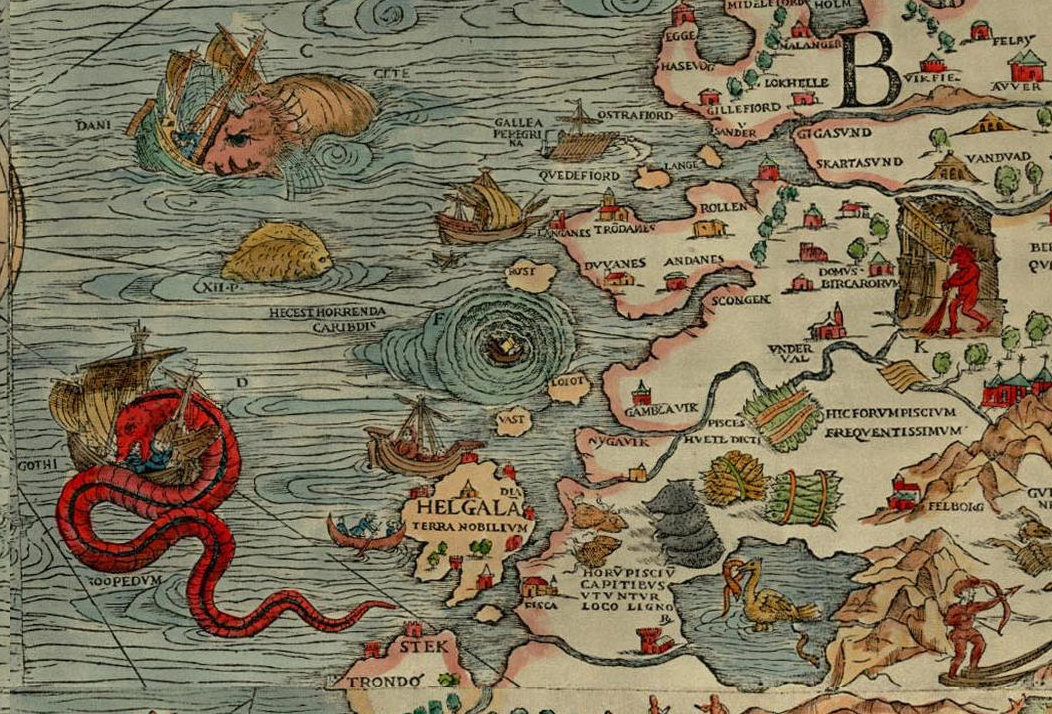
The maelstrom off Norway as illustrated by Olaus Magnus on the Carta Marina, 1539.

Moskstraumen, or the Lofoten maelstrom, is an unusual system of tidal currents in the open seas near the Lofoten Islands off the Norwegian coast. It is the second strongest whirlpool in the world with flow currents reaching speeds as high as 32 km/h (20 mph). This is supposedly the whirlpool depicted in Olaus Magnus's map, labeled as "Horrenda Caribdis" (Charybdis).

The Moskstraumen is formed by the combination of powerful semi-diurnal tides and the unusual shape of the seabed, with a shallow ridge between the Moskenesøya and Værøya islands which amplifies and whirls the tidal currents.

The fictional depictions of the Moskstraumen by Edgar Allan Poe, Jules Verne, and Cixin Liu describe it as a gigantic circular vortex that reaches the bottom of the ocean, when in fact it is a set of currents and crosscurrents with a rate of 18 km/h (11 mph). Poe described this phenomenon in his short story "A Descent into the Maelström", which in 1841 was the first to use the word maelstrom in the English language; in this story related to the Lofoten Maelstrom, two fishermen are swallowed by the maelstrom while one survives.

=== Corryvreckan ===
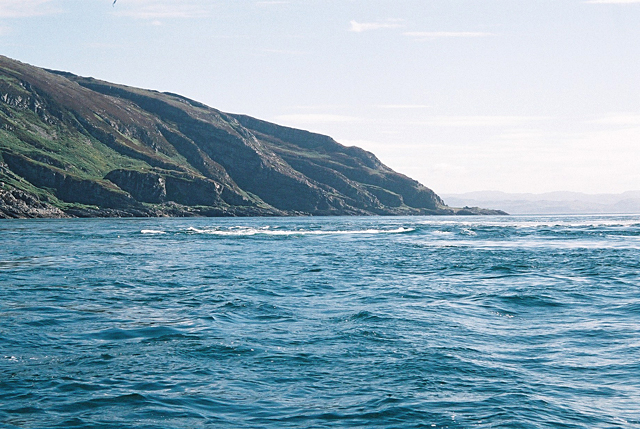
Corryvreckan whirlpool

The Corryvreckan is a narrow strait between the islands of Jura and Scarba, in Argyll and Bute, on the northern side of the Gulf of Corryvreckan, Scotland. It is the third-largest whirlpool in the world. Flood tides and inflow from the Firth of Lorne to the west can drive the waters of Corryvreckan to waves of more than 9 metres (30 ft), and the roar of the resulting maelstrom, which reaches speeds of 18 km/h (11 mph), can be heard 16 km (10 mi) away. Though it was classified initially as non-navigable by the Royal Navy it was later categorized as "extremely dangerous".

A documentary team from Scottish independent producers Northlight Productions once threw a mannequin into the Corryvreckan ("the Hag") with a high-visibility vest and depth gauge. The mannequin was swallowed and spat up far down current with a depth gauge reading of 262 m (860 ft) and evidence of being dragged along the bottom for a great distance.

=== Niagara Whirlpool ===
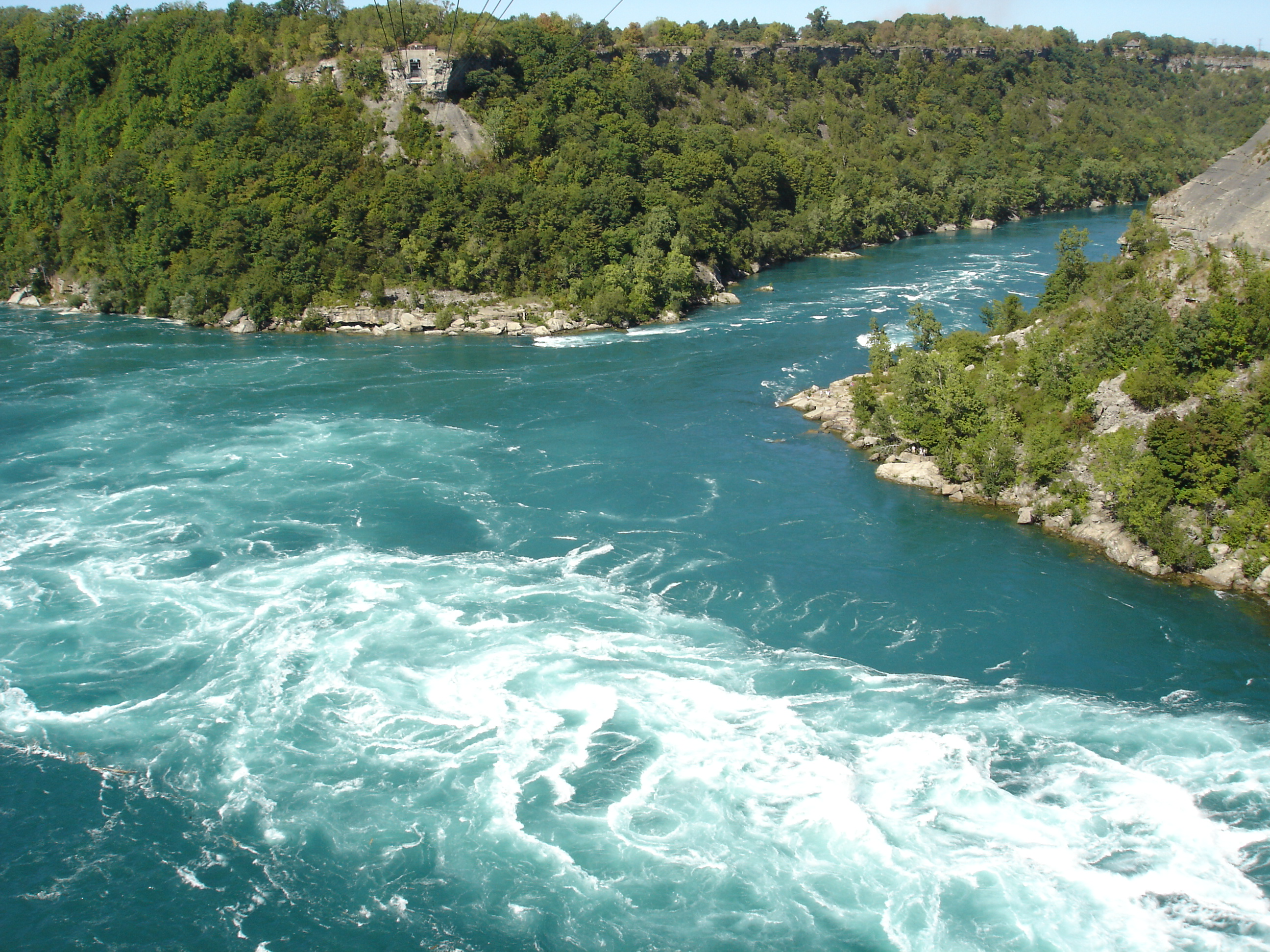
Niagara Whirlpool

About three miles (4.8 kilometers) downstream from Niagara Falls is the Niagara Whirlpool. Located mostly in Canada and partially in the United States, the whirlpool is crossed by the Whirlpool Aero Car.

The basin of the whirlpool is 1,700 feet (518 meters) long and 1,200 feet (365 meters) wide. Its maximum water depth is 125 feet (38 meters).

=== Other notable maelstroms and whirlpools ===
Old Sow whirlpool is located between Deer Island, New Brunswick, Canada, and Moose Island, Eastport, Maine, USA. It is given the epithet "pig-like" as it makes a screeching noise when the vortex is at its full fury and reaches speeds of as much as 27.6 km/h (17.1 mph). The smaller whirlpools around this Old Sow are known as "Piglets".

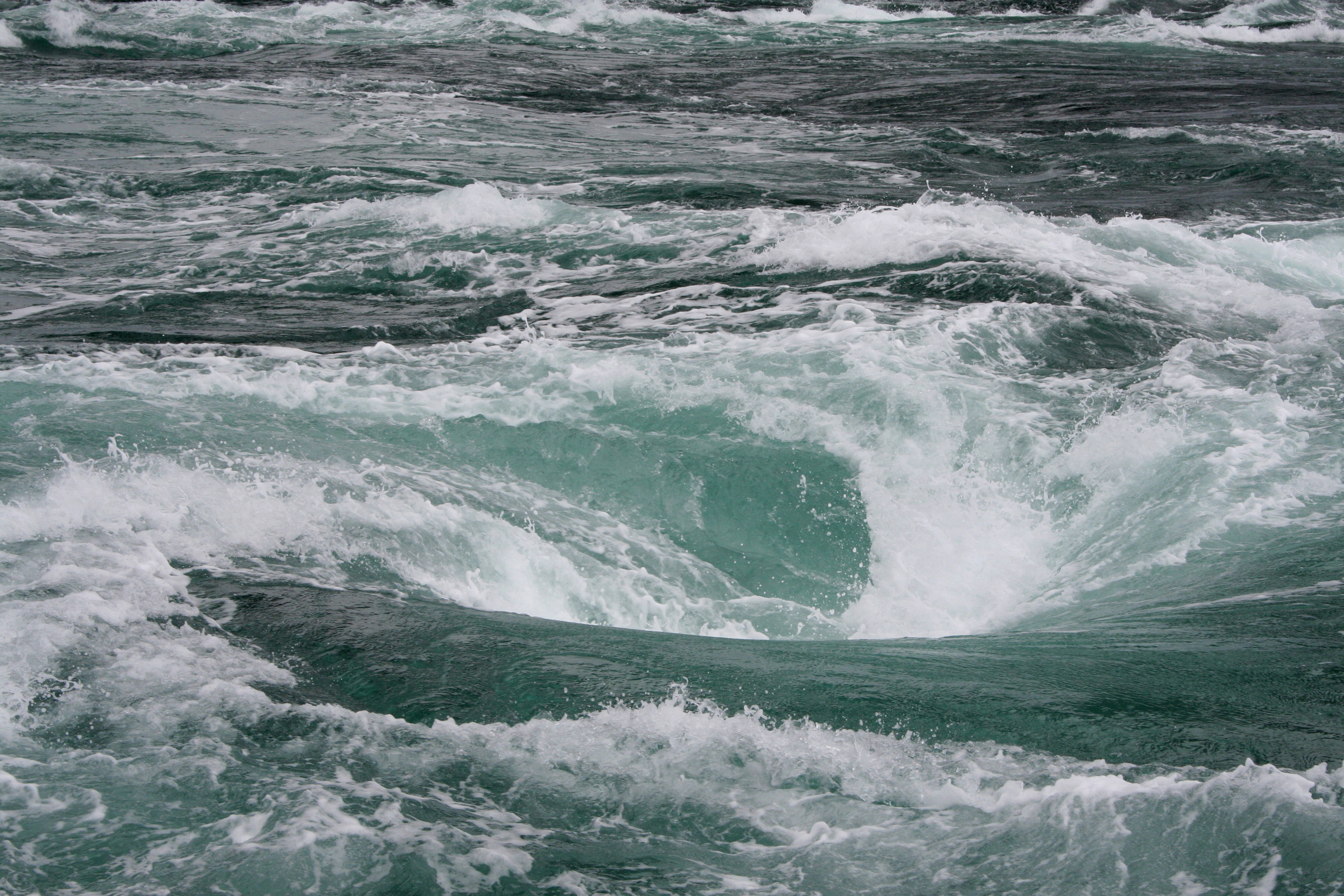
Naruto whirlpools

The Naruto whirlpools are located in the Naruto Strait near Awaji Island in Japan, which have speeds of 26 km/h (16 mph).

Skookumchuck Narrows is a tidal rapids that develops whirlpools, on the Sunshine Coast, British Columbia, Canada with speeds of the current exceeding 30 km/h (19 mph).

French Pass (Te Aumiti) is a narrow and treacherous stretch of water that separates D'Urville Island from the north end of the South Island of New Zealand. In 2000 a whirlpool there caught student divers, resulting in fatalities.

A short-lived whirlpool sucked in a portion of the 1,300-acre (530 ha) Lake Peigneur in Louisiana, United States after a drilling mishap on November 20, 1980. This was not a naturally occurring whirlpool, but a disaster caused by underwater drillers breaking through the roof of a salt mine. The lake then drained into the mine until the mine filled and the water levels equalized, but the formerly 10-foot (3.0 m) deep lake was now 1,300 feet (400 m) deep. This mishap caused a sinkhole, and in the end, resulted in the destruction of five houses, the loss of nineteen barges and eight tug boats, oil rigs, a mobile home, trees, acres of land, and most of a botanical garden. The adjacent settlement of Jefferson Island was reduced in area by 10%. A crater 0.5 miles (0.8 km) across was left behind. Nine of the barges, which had sunk, later resurfaced after the whirlpool subsided.

A more recent example of an artificial whirlpool that received significant media coverage occurred in early June 2015, when an intake vortex formed in Lake Texoma, on the Oklahoma–Texas border, near the floodgates of the dam that forms the lake. At the time of the whirlpool's formation, the lake was being drained after reaching its highest level ever. The Army Corps of Engineers, which operates the dam and lake, expected that the whirlpool would last until the lake reached normal seasonal levels by late July.

== Dangers ==
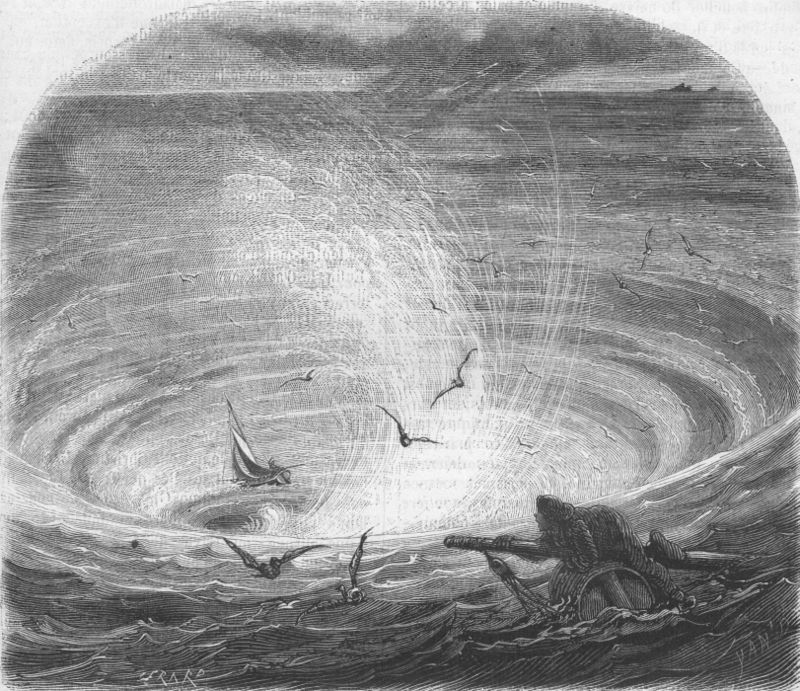
An illustration from Jules Verne's essay "Edgard Poë et ses œuvres" (Edgar Poe and his Works, 1862) drawn by Frederic Lix or Yan' Dargent.

Powerful whirlpools have killed unlucky seafarers.They can pull boats or ships towards them and can be almost impossible to escape if close to it. This will lead to a large amount of injuries or even could be lethal. One of the few reports of a large disaster comes from the fourteenth-century Mali Empire ruler Mansa Musa, as reported by a contemporary, Ibn Fadlallah al-Umari:

The ruler who preceded me did not believe that it was impossible to reach the extremity of the ocean that encircles the earth (meaning Atlantic), and wanted to reach that (end) and obstinately persisted in the design. So he equipped two hundred boats full of men, like many others full of gold, water and victuals sufficient for several years. He ordered the chief (admiral) not to return until they had reached the extremity of the ocean, or if they had exhausted the provisions and the water. They set out. Their absence extended over a long period, and, at last, only one boat returned. On our questioning, the captain said: 'Prince, we have navigated for a long time, until we saw in the midst of the ocean as if a big river was flowing violently. My boat was the last one; others were ahead of me. As soon as any of them reached this place, it drowned in the whirlpool and never came out. I sailed backward to escape this current.'

Tales like those by Paul the Deacon, Edgar Allan Poe, and Jules Verne are entirely fictional.

However, temporary whirlpools caused by major engineering disasters, such as the Lake Peigneur disaster, have been recorded as capable of submerging medium-sized watercraft such as barges and tugboats.

== In literature and popular culture ==
Besides Poe and Verne, another literary source is of the 1500s, Olaus Magnus, a Swedish bishop, who had stated that a maelstrom more powerful than the one written about in the Odyssey sucked in ships, which sank to the bottom of the sea, and even whales were pulled in. Pytheas, the Greek historian, also mentioned that maelstroms swallowed ships and threw them up again.

The monster Charybdis of Greek mythology was later rationalized as a whirlpool, which sucked entire ships into its fold in the narrow coast of Sicily, a disaster faced by navigators.

During the 8th century, Paul the Deacon, who had lived among the Belgii, described tidal bores and the maelstrom for a Mediterranean audience unused to such violent tidal surges:

Not very far from this shore... toward the western side, on which the ocean main lies open without end, is that very deep whirlpool of waters which we call by its familiar name "the navel of the sea". This is said to suck in the waves and spew them forth again twice every day. ... They say there is another whirlpool of this kind between the island of Britain and the province of Galicia, and with this fact the coasts of the Seine region and of Aquitaine agree, for they are filled twice a day with such sudden inundations that any one who may by chance be found only a little inward from the shore can hardly getaway. I have heard a certain high nobleman of the Gauls relating that a number of ships, shattered at first by a tempest, were afterward devoured by this same Charybdis. And when one only out of all the men who had been in these ships, still breathing, swam over the waves, while the rest were dying, he came, swept by the force of the receding waters, up to the edge of that most frightful abyss. And when now he beheld yawning before him the deep chaos whose end he could not see, and half dead from very fear, expected to be hurled into it, suddenly in a way that he could not have hoped he was cast upon a certain rock and sat him down.

— Paul the Deacon, History of the Lombards, i.6

Three of the most notable literary references to the Lofoten Maelstrom date from the nineteenth century. The first is a short story by Edgar Allan Poe named "A Descent into the Maelström" (1841). The second is Twenty Thousand Leagues Under the Seas (1870), a novel by Jules Verne. At the end of this novel, Captain Nemo seems to commit suicide, sending his Nautilus submarine into the Maelstrom (although in Verne's sequel Nemo and the Nautilus were seen to have survived). The "Norway maelstrom" is also mentioned in Herman Melville's Moby-Dick.

In the Life of St Columba, the author, Adomnan of Iona, attributes to the saint miraculous knowledge of a particular bishop who sailed into a whirlpool off the coast of Ireland. In Adomnan's narrative, he quotes Columba saying

Cólman mac Beognai has set sail to come here and is now in great danger in the surging tides of the whirlpool of Corryvreckan. Sitting in the prow, he lifts up his hands to heaven and blesses the turbulent, terrible seas. Yet the Lord terrifies him in this way, not so that the ship in which he sits should be overwhelmed and wrecked by the waves, but rather to rouse him to pray more fervently that he may sail through the peril and reach us here.

The Corryvreckan whirlpool plays a key role in the 1945 Powell and Pressburger film I Know Where I'm Going! Joan Webster (Wendy Hiller) is determined to get to the Isle of Kiloran and marry her fiancé. Dangerous weather delays her crossing, and her determination becomes desperate when she realizes that she is falling in love with Torquil MacNeil (Roger Livesey). Against the advice of experienced folk, she offers a young fisherman a huge sum of money to take her over. At the last moment, Royal Naval Officer Torquil steps into the boat, and after a squall knocks the engine out of commission, they face the whirlpool. Torquil manages to repair the engine before the tide turns, and they return to the mainland. This part of the picture uses footage Powell filmed, while tied to a mast to leave both hands free for the camera, at Corryvreckan, incorporated into scenes shot in a huge tank at the studio.

In the 2007 film Pirates of the Caribbean: At World's End, the final battle between the Black Pearl and the Flying Dutchman takes place with both ships sailing inside a giant whirlpool which appears to be over a kilometer wide and several hundred meters deep. The fantasy novels Eldest and The Bellmaker (otherwise unconnected) both feature a scene where the protagonists' ship escapes pursuit by successfully navigating a massive whirlpool, while the pursuing vessel fails to do so and is dragged under.

== See also ==
- Coriolis effect
- Eddy (fluid dynamics)
- Rip current
