= Flakstad =

Flakstad may refer to:

== Places ==
- Flakstad Municipality, a municipality in the Lofoten district of Nordland county, Norway
- Flakstad (village), a small village within Flakstad Municipality in the Lofoten district of Nordland county, Norway
- Flakstad Church, a church in Flakstad Municipality in the Lofoten district of Nordland county, Norway
- Flakstad Island, or Flakstadøya, an island within Flakstad Municipality in the Lofoten district of Nordland county, Norway

== People ==
- Nils Erik Flakstad (politician) (1876-1939), a Norwegian businessperson and politician
- Nils Erik Flakstad (sculptor) (1907-1979), a Norwegian sculptor
- Sunniva Flakstad Ihle (born 1983), a Norwegian politician for the Conservative Party

== Other ==
- Flakstad IL, a sports club based in Flakstad Municipality in the Lofoten district of Nordland county, Norway
