= Vareid =

Village in Flakstad Municipality, Norway

- Village
- Interactive map of Vareid
- Location within Nordland Location within Norway
- Coordinates: 68.02272°N 13.15435°E
- Country: Norway
- Region: Northern Norway
- County: Nordland
- District: Lofoten
- Municipality: Flakstad Municipality
- Elevation: 15 m (49 ft)
- Time zone: UTC+01:00 (CET)
  - Summer (DST): UTC+02:00 (CEST)
- Post Code: 8382

Vareid is a village in Flakstad Municipality in Nordland county, Norway. The village is located on the island of Flakstadøya in the Lofoten archipelago. The village of Napp lies about 4 kilometres (2.5 mi) to the east on the same island.
