= Sund, Flakstad =

Village in Flakstad Municipality, Norway

Sund
- Village
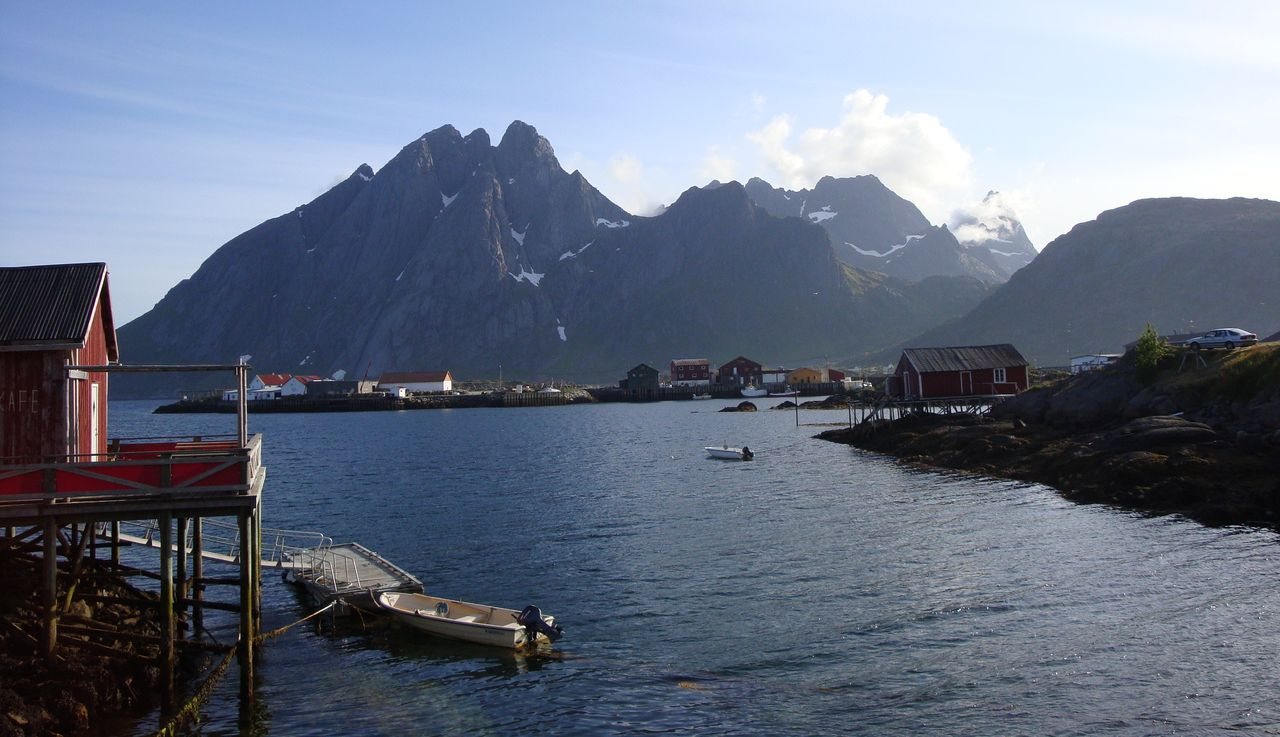
- View of the village
- Interactive map of Sund
- Location within Nordland Location within Norway
- Coordinates: 68°00′04″N 13°12′38″E
- Country: Norway
- Region: Northern Norway
- County: Nordland
- District: Lofoten
- Municipality: Flakstad Municipality
- Elevation: 4 m (13 ft)
- Time zone: UTC+01:00 (CET)
  - Summer (DST): UTC+02:00 (CEST)
- Post Code: 8384

Sund is a fishing village in Flakstad Municipality in the Lofoten district of Nordland county, Norway. The settlement, with around 100 permanent residents, is located on the southwest coast of the island of Flakstadøya. The fishing village is considered to be one of oldest in Lofoten. The privately owned Sund Fishery Museum (Sund Fiskerimuseum) is located at the harbor, as well as a mechanical workshop and mill.
