= Ramberg, Flakstad =

Village in Flakstad Municipality, Norway

Ramberg
- Village
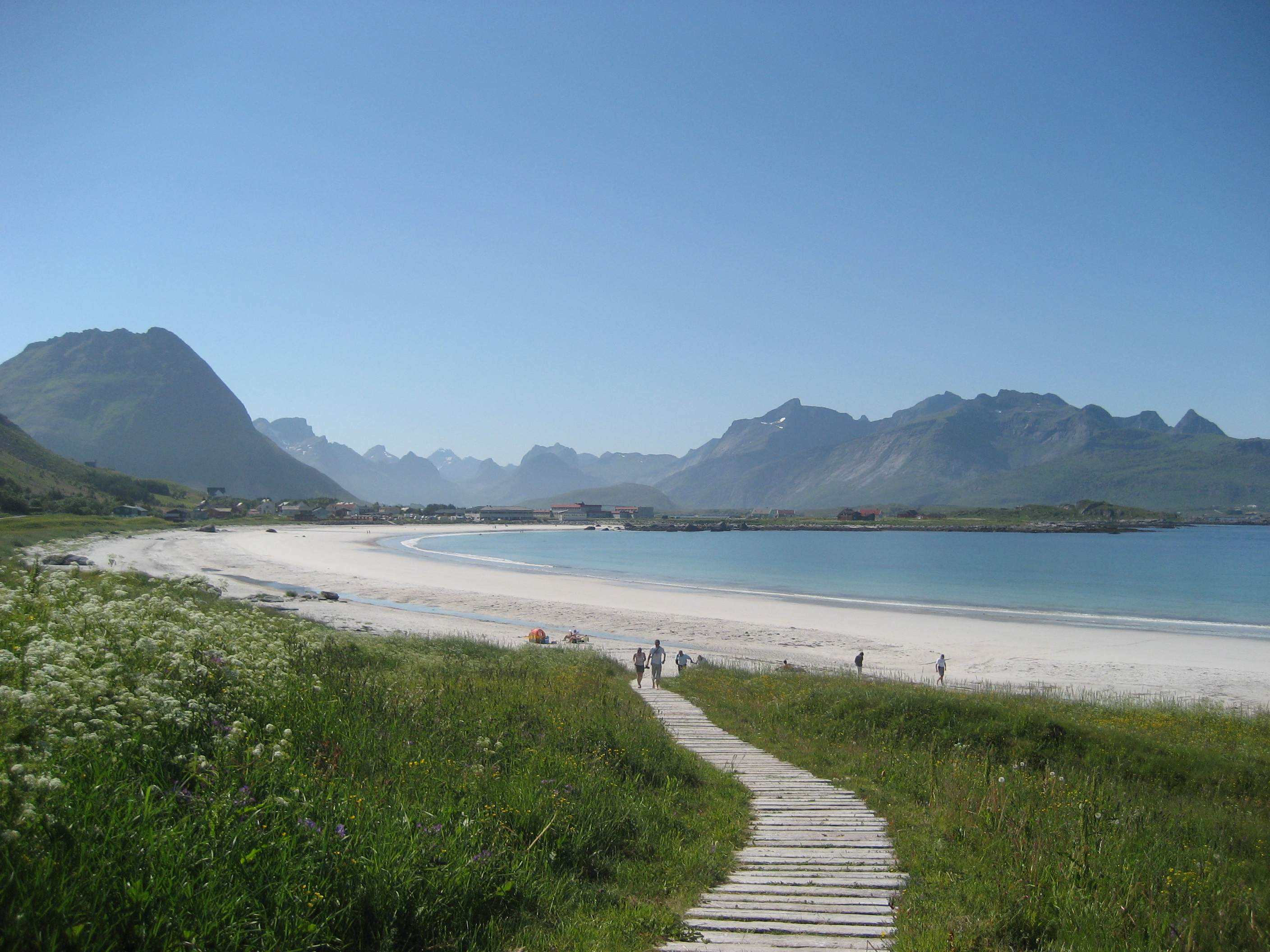
- View of the beach in Ramberg
- Interactive map of Ramberg
- Location within Nordland Location within Norway
- Coordinates: 68.0899°N 13.2299°E
- Country: Norway
- Region: Northern Norway
- County: Nordland
- District: Lofoten
- Municipality: Flakstad Municipality
- Elevation: 5 m (16 ft)
- Time zone: UTC+01:00 (CET)
  - Summer (DST): UTC+02:00 (CEST)
- Post Code: 8380 Ramberg

Ramberg is the administrative centre of Flakstad Municipality in Nordland county, Norway. The village is located on the island of Flakstadøya in the Lofoten archipelago. It has approximately 350 inhabitants. The European route E10 highway passes through Ramberg.

Ramberg has a library, a small shopping centre with a supermarkets that includes postal services, an unmanned petrol station, a restaurant and pub, and a bank. The youth club regularly shows films in the community hall, which is also used for functions. Ramberg school, located by the beach, caters for students from 1st to 10th grade and has both a swimming pool and a high-standard synthetic grass soccer field. Ramberg is also famous for its white sand beach. Norway's Crown Prince Haakon (later Haakon VIII) kited at Ramberg beach during the Easter holidays in 2012.

Flakstad Church is located about 4 kilometres (2.5 mi) northeast of Ramberg in the small village of Flakstad. It is the second church building to exist on this site since 1430. The timber used for the church came from Russia—the people of Flakstad exchanged fish for timber during the period of Pomor trade at that time. This is why the steeple has a Russian Orthodox look.
