= Nappstraum Tunnel =

Undersea road tunnel in Nordland, Norway

Nappstraum Tunnel Nappstraumtunnelen
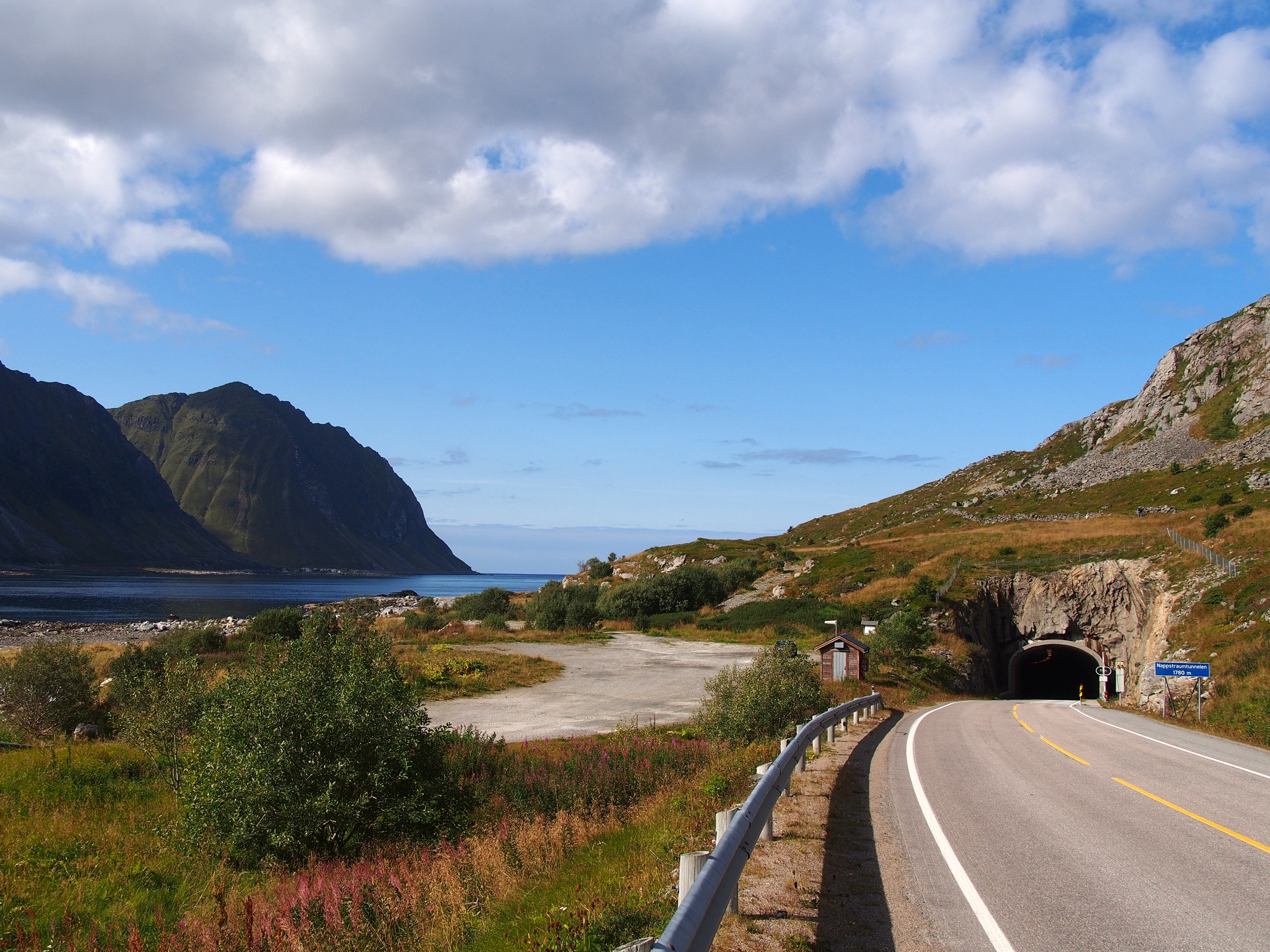
- View of the north entrance
- Interactive map of Nappstraum Tunnel; Nappstraumtunnelen

Overview
- Location: Nordland, Norway
- Coordinates: 68.1474°N 13.4658°E
- Status: In use
- Route: E10
- Start: Vestvågøya
- End: Flakstadøya

Operation
- Opened: 11 July 1990
- Operator: Statens vegvesen

Technical
- Length: 1,776 metres (5,827 ft)
- Min elevation: −63 metres (−207 ft)
- Grade: 8%

The Nappstraum Tunnel (Norwegian: Nappstraumtunnelen) is an undersea road tunnel in Nordland county, Norway. The 1,776-metre (5,827 ft) long tunnel is located on the European route E10 highway, connecting the islands of Flakstadøya (in Flakstad Municipality) and Vestvågøya (in Vestvågøy Municipality). The village of Napp lies just south of the west entrance to the tunnel. The tunnel opened on 11 July 1990 to replace an old ferry connection that ran between the two islands. The tunnel reaches a depth of 63 metres (207 ft) below sea level and the maximum road grade of the tunnel is 8%. The tunnel had a toll on it until 2003 when the debt for the tunnel was paid off.

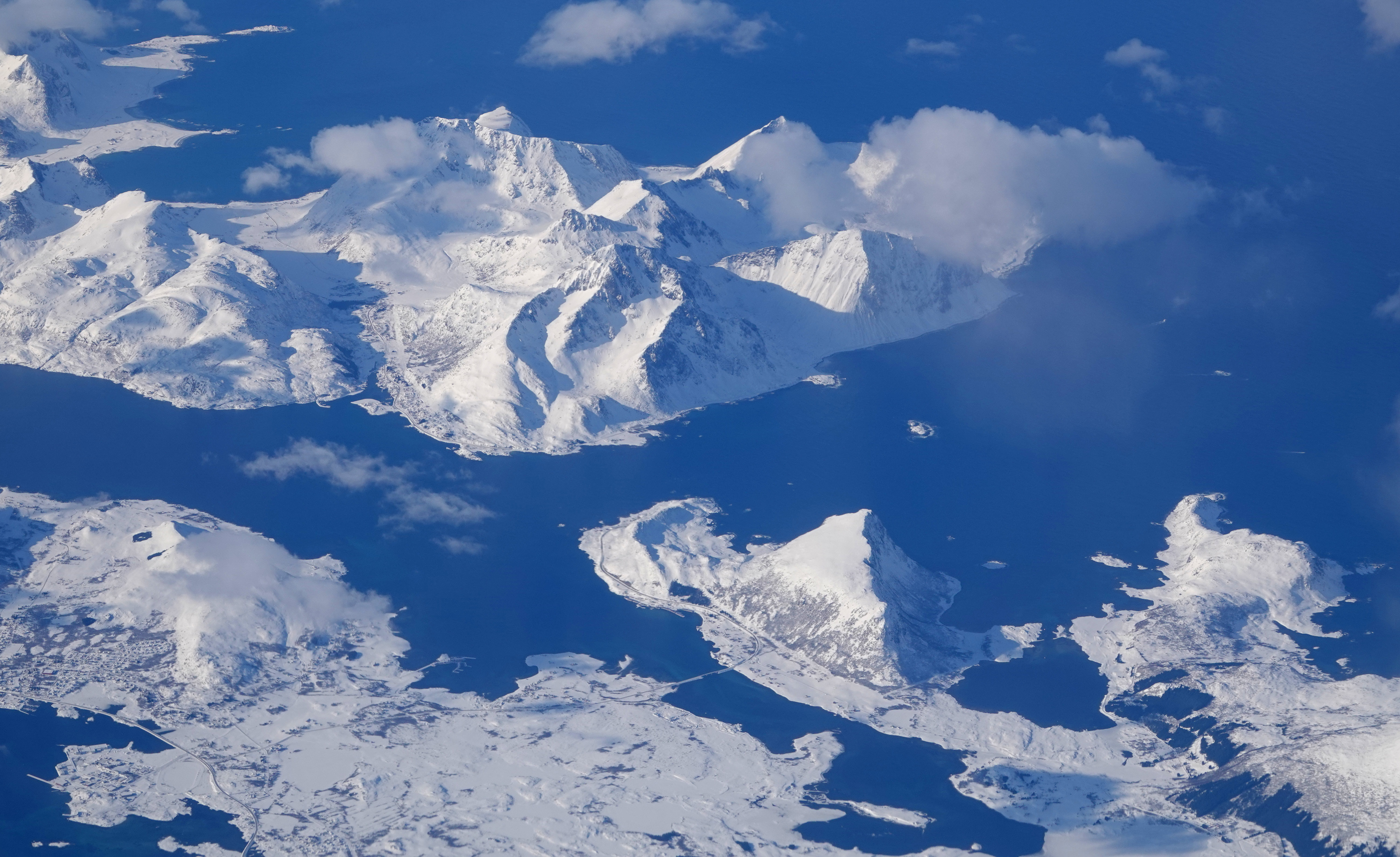
Aerial view of Nappstraumen, with both tunnel openings showing.
