= Napp, Norway =

Village in Flakstad Municipality, Norway

Napp
- Village
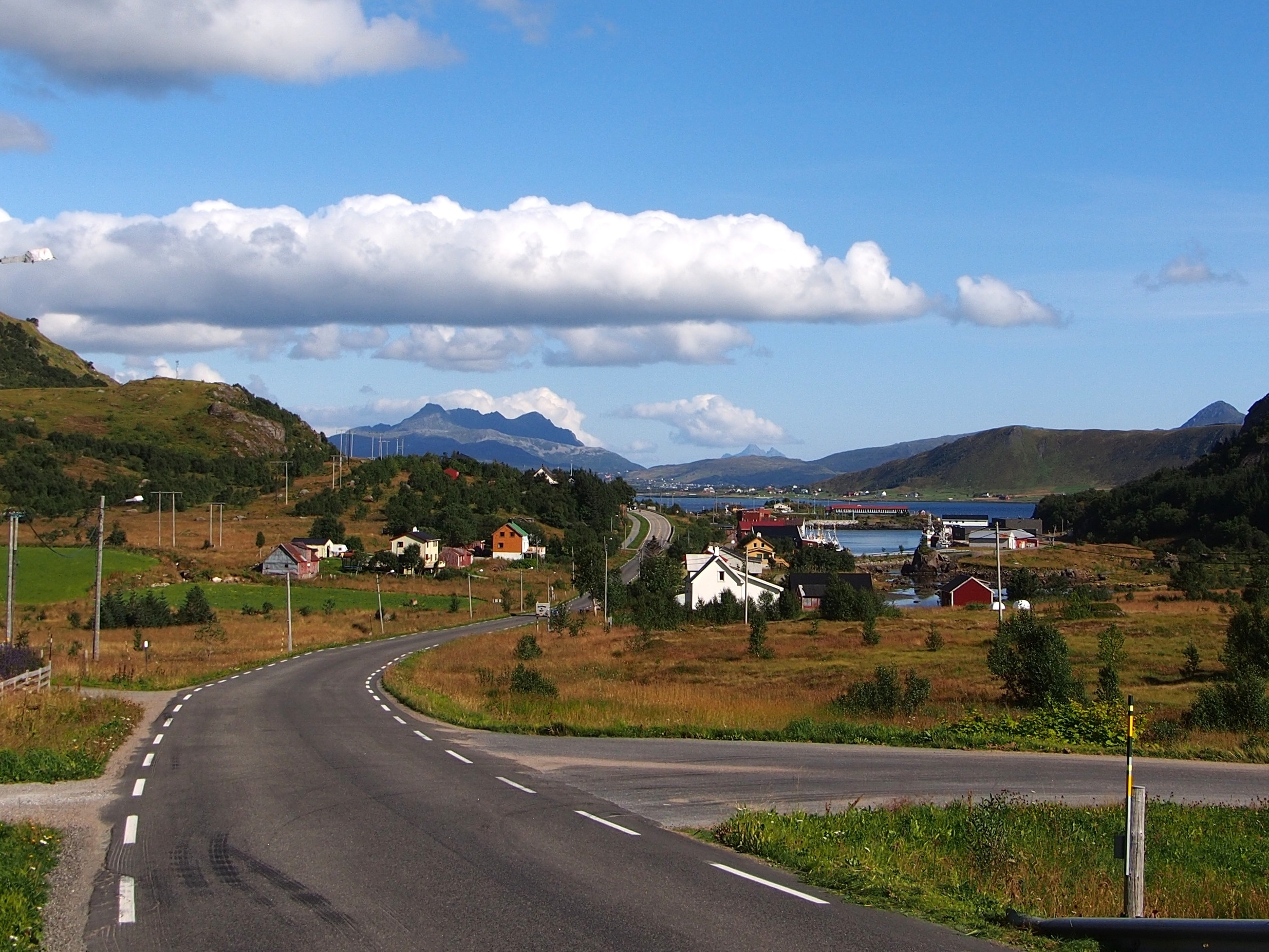
- View of the village
- Interactive map of Napp
- Location within Nordland Location within Norway
- Coordinates: 68.1332°N 13.4319°E
- Country: Norway
- Region: Northern Norway
- County: Nordland
- District: Lofoten
- Municipality: Flakstad Municipality

Area
  - Total: 0.2 km^{2} (0.077 sq mi)
- Elevation: 13 m (43 ft)

Population (2017)
  - Total: 210
  - Density: 1,050/km^{2} (2,700/sq mi)
- Time zone: UTC+01:00 (CET)
  - Summer (DST): UTC+02:00 (CEST)
- Post Code: 8382 Napp

Napp is a small fishing village in Flakstad Municipality in Nordland county, Norway. The village is located on the northern part of the island of Flakstadøya in the Lofoten archipelago. The village lies along the European route E10 highway, just west of the Nappstraum Tunnel which connects it to the neighboring island of Vestvågøya.

The 0.2-square-kilometre (49-acre) village had a population (2017) of 210 and a population density of 1,050 inhabitants per square kilometre (2,700/sq mi). Since 2017, the population and area data for this village area has not been separately tracked by Statistics Norway.
