= Flakstad (village) =

Village in Flakstad Municipality, Norway

- Village
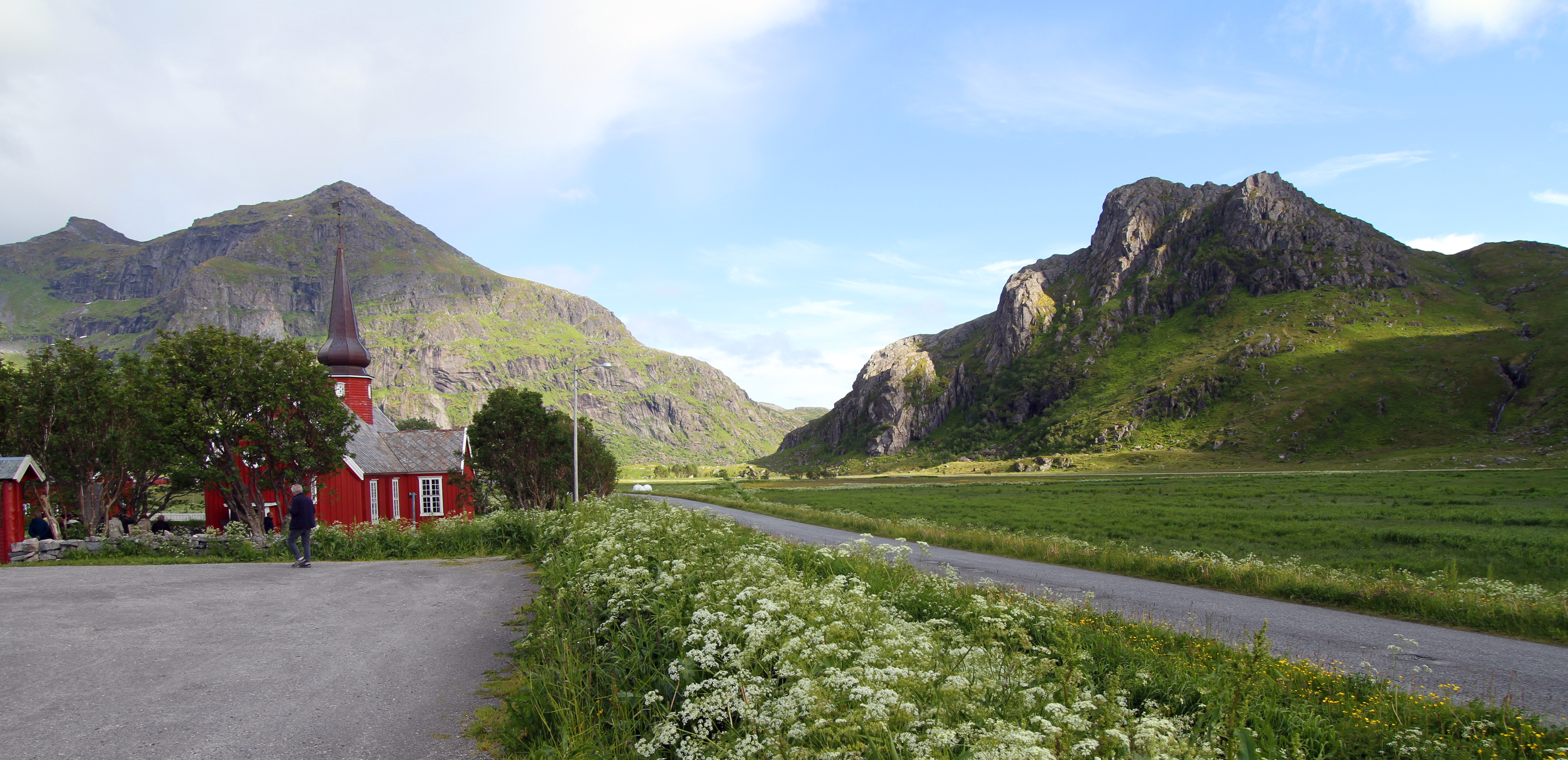
- View of the village church
- Interactive map of Flakstad
- Location within Nordland Location within Norway
- Coordinates: 68.10598°N 13.30085°E
- Country: Norway
- Region: Northern Norway
- County: Nordland
- District: Lofoten
- Municipality: Flakstad Municipality
- Elevation: 10 m (33 ft)
- Time zone: UTC+01:00 (CET)
  - Summer (DST): UTC+02:00 (CEST)
- Post Code: 8380 Ramberg

Flakstad is a village in Flakstad Municipality in Nordland county, Norway. The village is located on the island of Flakstadøya about 4 kilometres (2.5 mi) to the northeast of the village of Ramberg. Flakstad Church is located in the village, just north of the European route E10 highway.
