= Nusfjord =

Village in Flakstad Municipality, Norway

- Village
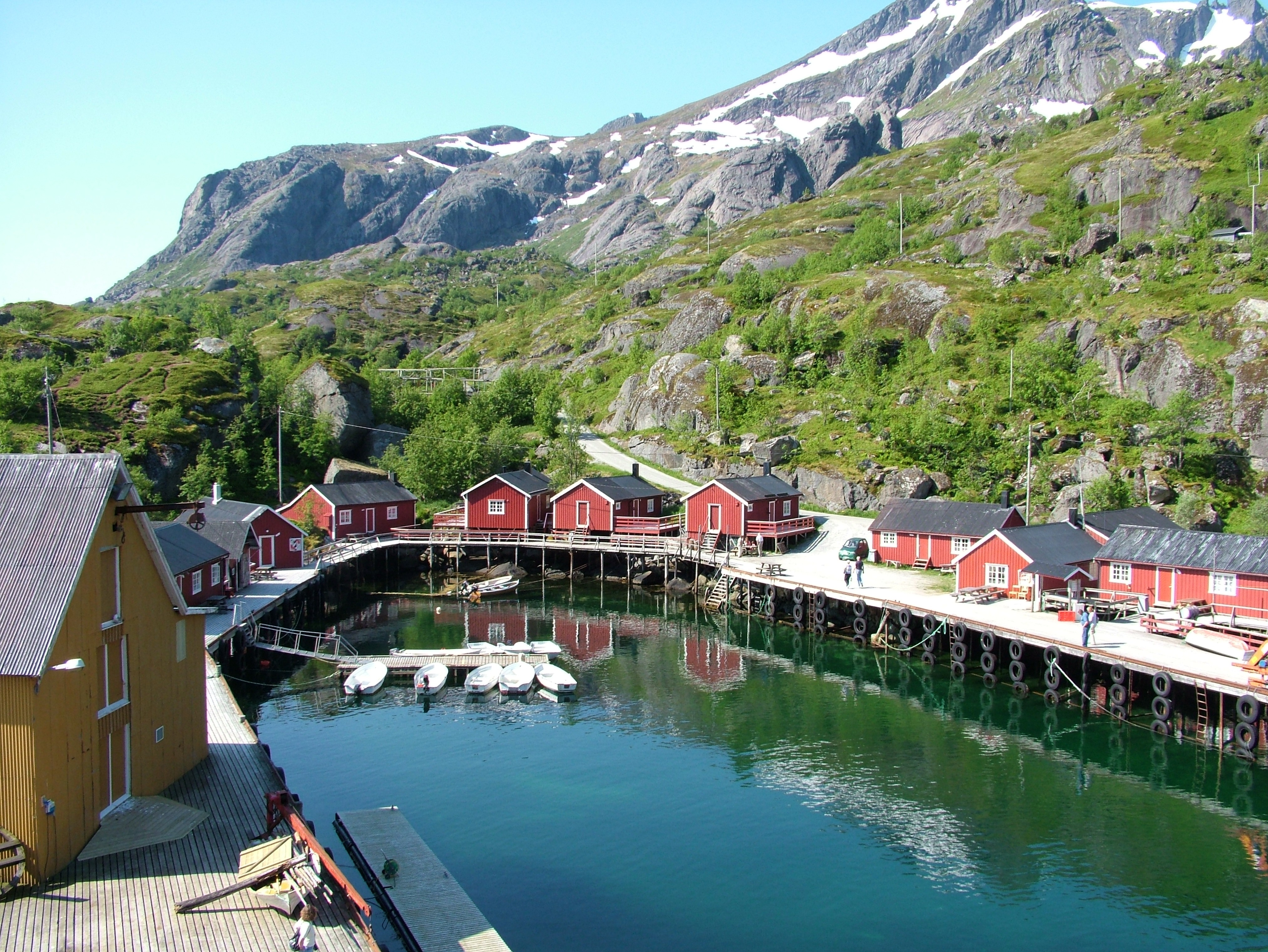
- View of the village
- Interactive map of Nusfjord
- Location within Nordland Location within Norway
- Coordinates: 68.0353°N 13.3478°E
- Country: Norway
- Region: Northern Norway
- County: Nordland
- District: Lofoten
- Municipality: Flakstad Municipality
- Elevation: 10 m (33 ft)
- Time zone: UTC+01:00 (CET)
  - Summer (DST): UTC+02:00 (CEST)
- Post Code: 8380 Ramberg

Nusfjord is a fishing village in Flakstad Municipality in Lofoten in Nordland county, Norway. The village lies on the southern shore of the island of Flakstadøya, along the Vestfjorden.

In 2017, Uwe Rosenberg designed and published a board game about fishing that was named after the village.

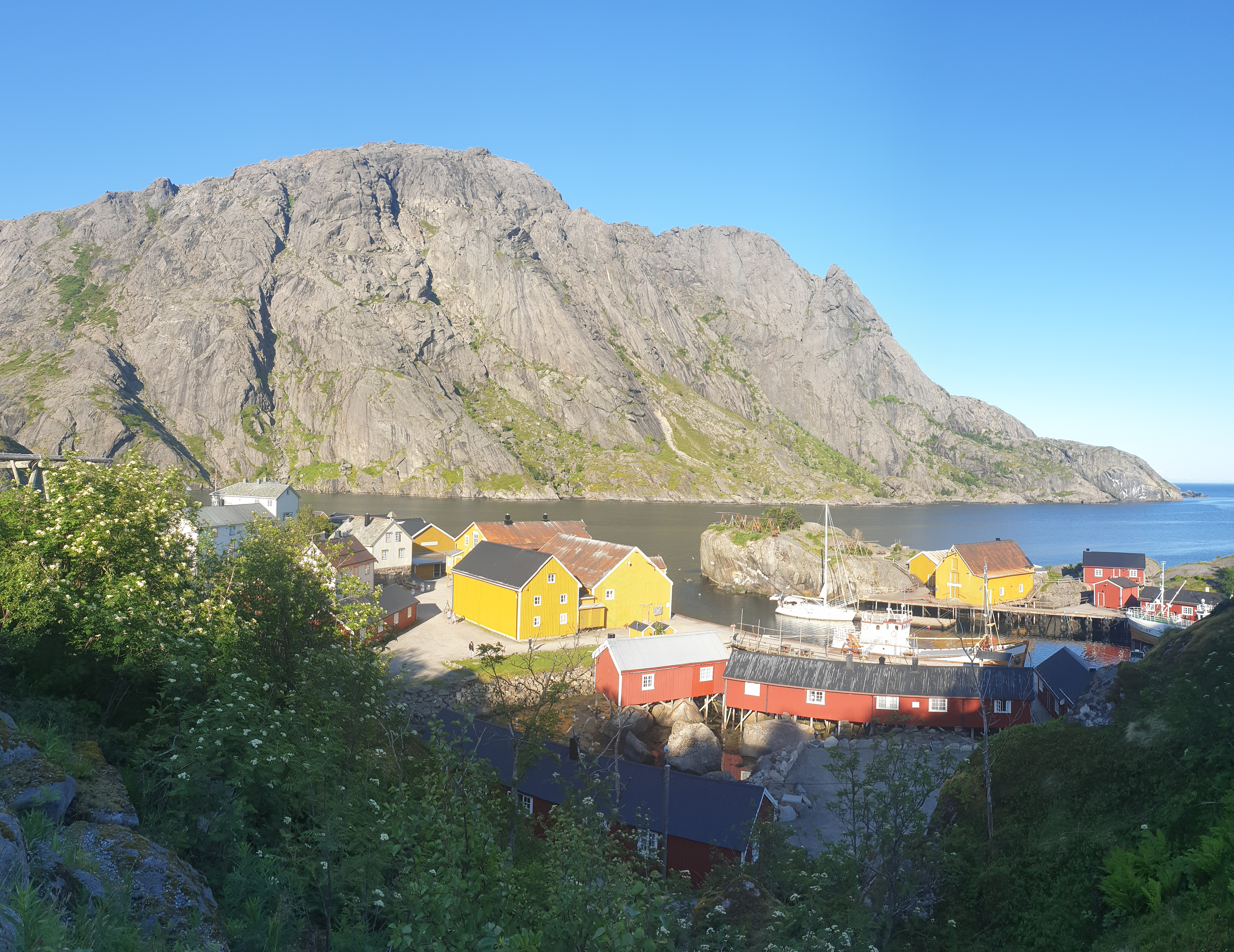
Nusfjord the harbour
