= Solbjørnvatnet =

Lake in Flakstad Municipality, Norway

- Interactive map of the lake
- Location: Nordland
- Coordinates: 68.0026°N 13.1451°E
- Basin countries: Norway
- Max. length: 4 kilometres (2.5 mi)
- Max. width: 2 kilometres (1.2 mi)
- Surface area: 5.02 km^{2} (1.94 sq mi)
- Shore length^{1}: 16.61 kilometres (10.32 mi)
- Surface elevation: 81 metres (266 ft)
- References: NVE
- ^{1} Shore length is not a well-defined measure.

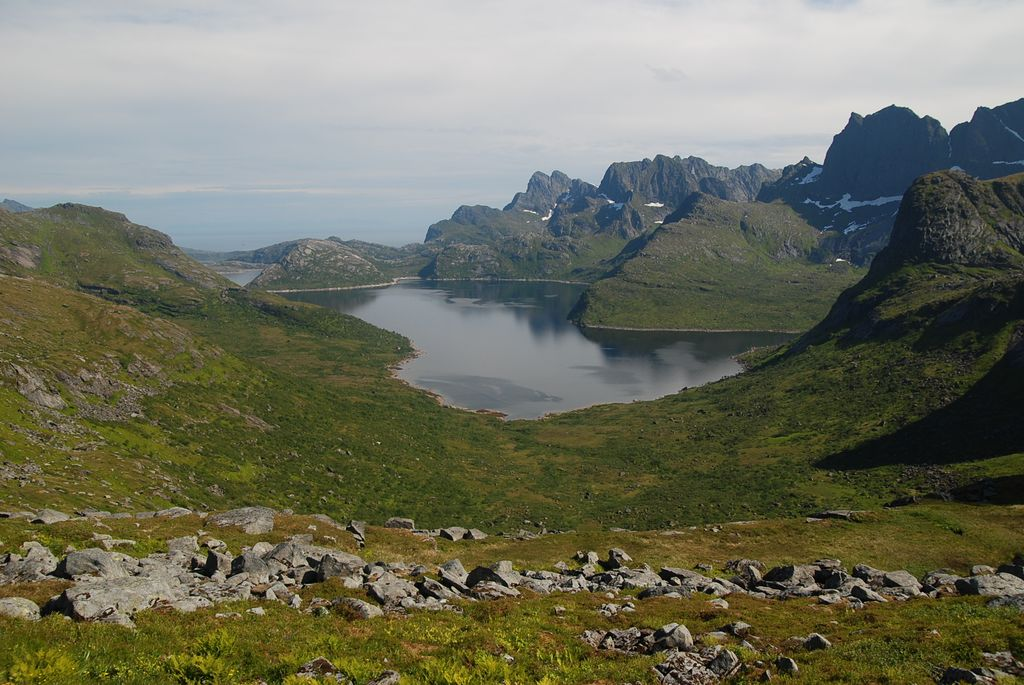
Solbjørnvatnet lake on Moskenesøya island in Lofoten, Norway.

Solbjørnvatnet is a lake in Flakstad Municipality in Nordland county, Norway. The 5.02-square-kilometre (1.94 sq mi) lake is located on the northern part of the island of Moskenesøya, less than 900 metres (3,000 ft) west of the European route E10 highway. The mountain Klokktinden lies on the southern shore of the lake.

== See also ==
- List of lakes in Norway
