= Jon Tørset =

Norwegian politician (born 1940)

Jon Tørset (born 8 July 1940) is a Norwegian politician for the Centre Party.

He served as a deputy representative to the Parliament of Norway from Nordland during the terms 1985–1989 and 1997–2001. He also served as county mayor of Nordland from 1999 to 2007.

Political offices
Preceded by Alf Ivar Samuelsen	County mayor of Nordland; 1999–2007	Succeeded by Mariette Korsrud
