= Alf Ivar Samuelsen =

Norwegian politician

Alf Ivar Samuelsen (28 February 1942 – 16 September 2014) was a Norwegian politician for the Centre Party.

He was born in Flakstad Municipality as a son of smallholder and fisher Ingleiv Samuelsen (1908–1964) and housewife Amy Pedersen (1906–2002). He received his teacher's education at Bodø Teacher's College from 1972 to 1974, and studied history there as well from 1983 to 1984.

Samuelsen was a member of the municipal council for Flakstad Municipality from 1975 to 1987, serving as mayor there from 1986 to 1987. He chaired the local chapter of his party from 1990 to 1994, and the regional chapter from 1994 to 1995. He was a county council member in Nordland from 1991 to 1999, and was county mayor of Nordland from 1995 to 1999. From 1999 to 2003 he was a member of the county cabinet.

He was elected to the Parliament of Norway from Nordland in 2005, having previously served as a deputy representative during the term 1993–1997. He was a member of the Preparatory Credentials Committee and the Enlarged Committee on Foreign Affairs during his entire term, and also the Standing Committee on Foreign Affairs (until 2008) and the Standing Committee on Labour and Social Affairs (from 2008). He was not re-elected in 2009.

Samuelsen died in a tractor accident on 16 September 2014 in Flakstad. He was 72.

Political offices
Preceded by Sigbjørn Eriksen	County mayor of Nordland; 1995–1999	Succeeded by Jon Tørset
