= Flakstad Church =

- Flakstad kirke
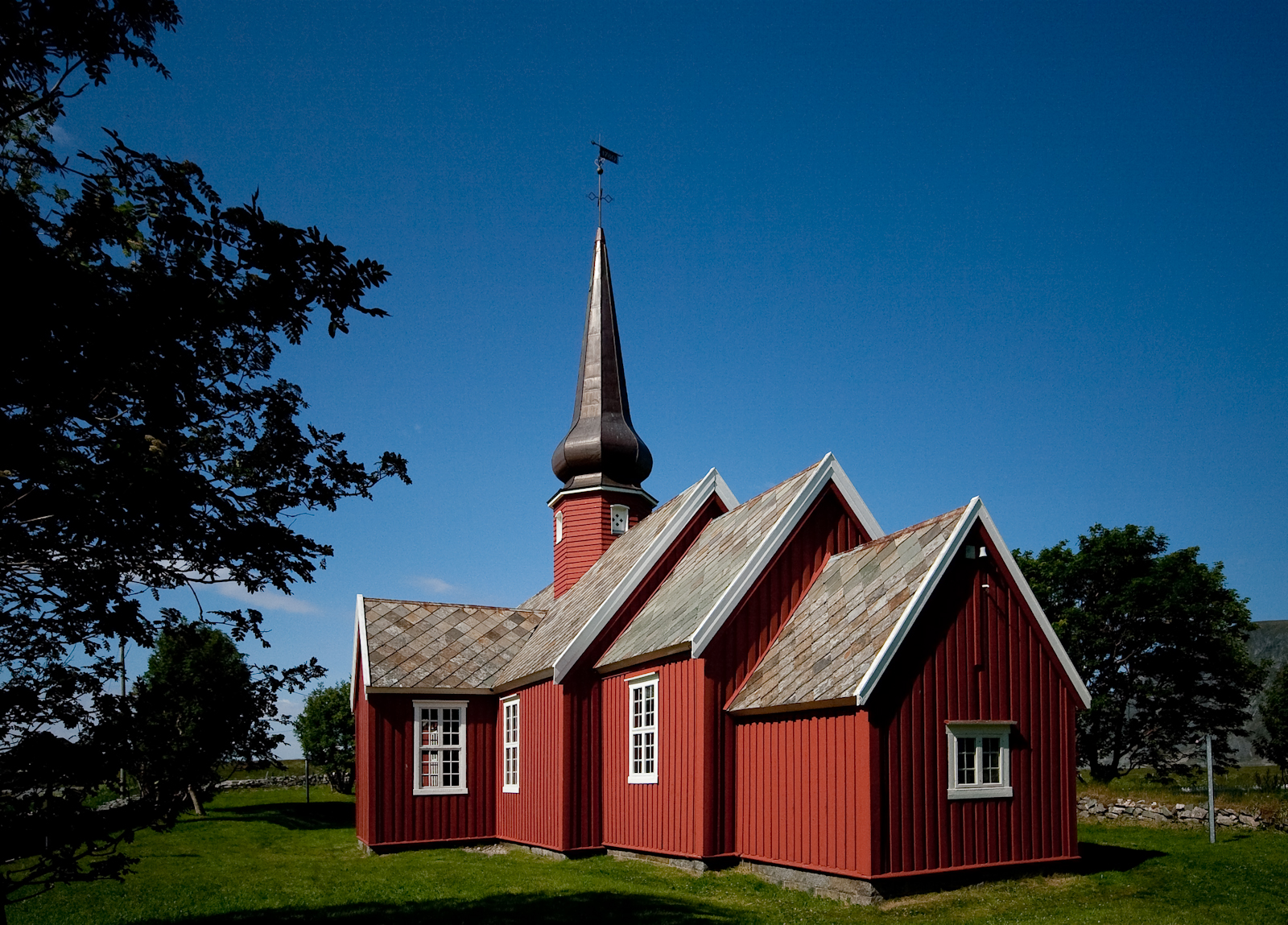
- View of the church
- Flakstad Church
- 68.10479764°N 13.3063006°E
- Location: Flakstad, Nordland
- Country: Norway
- Denomination: Church of Norway
- Churchmanship: Evangelical Lutheran

History
- Status: Parish church
- Founded: 13th century
- Consecrated: 1780

Architecture
- Functional status: Active
- Architectural type: Cruciform
- Completed: 1780 (246 years ago)

Specifications
- Capacity: 250
- Materials: Wood

Administration
- Diocese: Sør-Hålogaland
- Deanery: Lofoten prosti
- Parish: Flakstad
- Norwegian Cultural Heritage Site
- Type: Church
- Status: Automatically protected
- ID: 84156

Flakstad Church (Norwegian: Flakstad kirke) is a parish church of the Church of Norway in Flakstad Municipality in Nordland county, Norway. It is located in the village of Flakstad. It is the church for the Flakstad parish which is part of the Lofoten prosti (deanery) in the Diocese of Sør-Hålogaland. The red, wooden church was built in a cruciform style in 1780. The church seats about 300 people. It is the millennium site for Flakstad Municipality.

The long, low church building is a cog-jointed construction using timbers clad externally with red-painted wooden paneling, as was usual at the end of the eighteenth century. The small-paned windows have white frames. The roof is covered with tiles and a ridge turret with an onion dome and spire crowns the intersection of the cross arms.

== History ==
Flakstad Church was first mentioned in existing written sources in 1430, but it was likely built before that time. The church has a limestone baptismal font that dates back to 1250–1300, which suggests that the church may have been built in the second half of the 13th century. The medieval building was a timber-framed cruciform design, but had no tower. The old building was destroyed by a storm around the year 1780. Shortly afterwards, a new church was built in approximately the same site using timber from Russia. The new building seats about 300 people. One of chandeliers in the new church also came from Russia. Several of the items from the old church including two chandeliers and the altartable were taken from the old church and put into the new church. The new church had a tower on the roof about the central part of the building. The tower has a small onion dome on top.

In 1814, this church served as an election church (Norwegian: valgkirke). Together with more than 300 other parish churches across Norway, it was a polling station for elections to the 1814 Norwegian Constituent Assembly which wrote the Constitution of Norway. This was Norway's first national elections. Each church parish was a constituency that elected people called "electors" who later met together in each county to elect the representatives for the assembly that was to meet at Eidsvoll Manor later that year.

In 1874, a hurricane blew the church tower off. The tower was then temporarily set up next to the church. During renovations in 1938, the tower was put back in place on top of the church.

== Media gallery ==
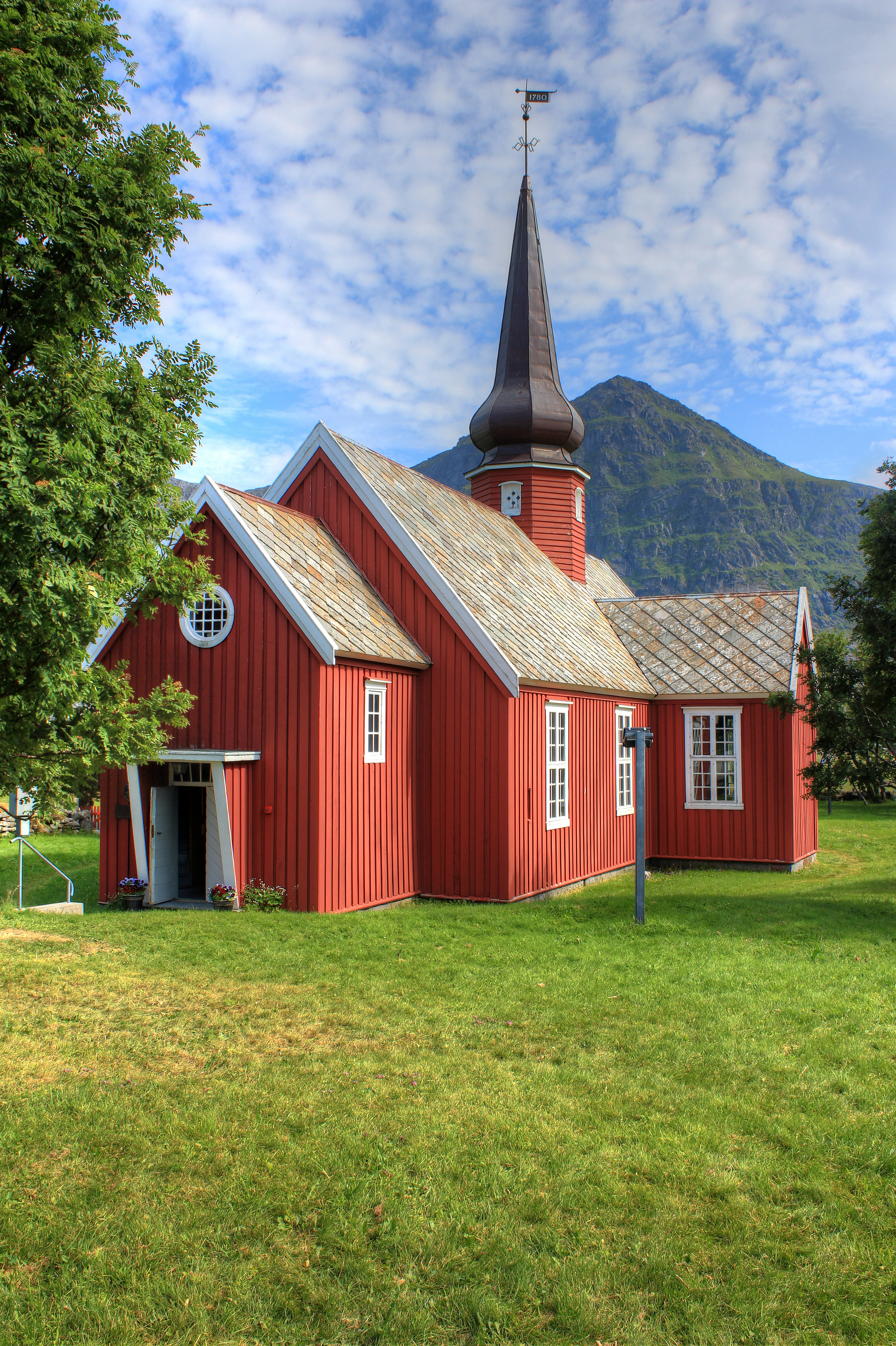

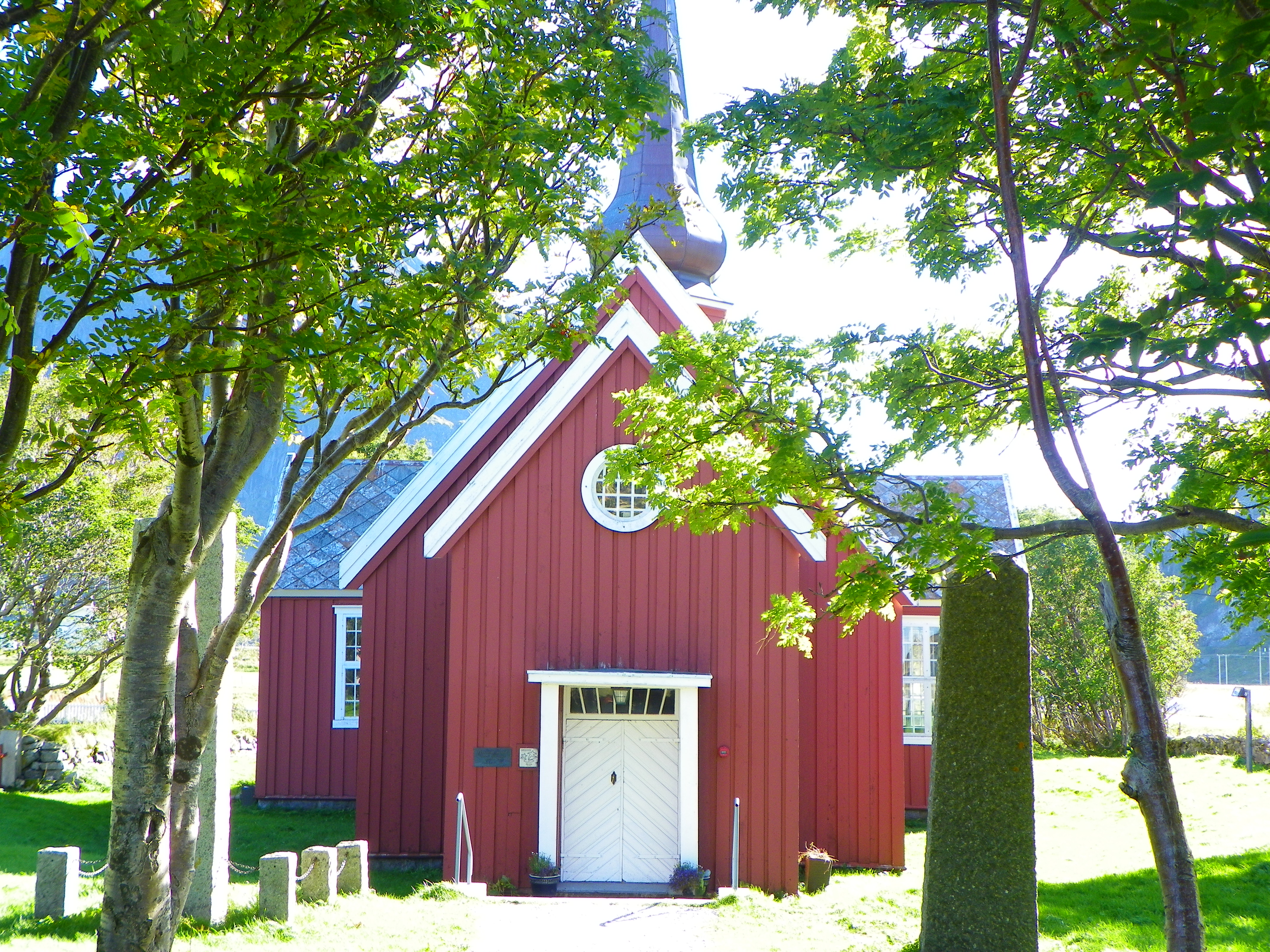

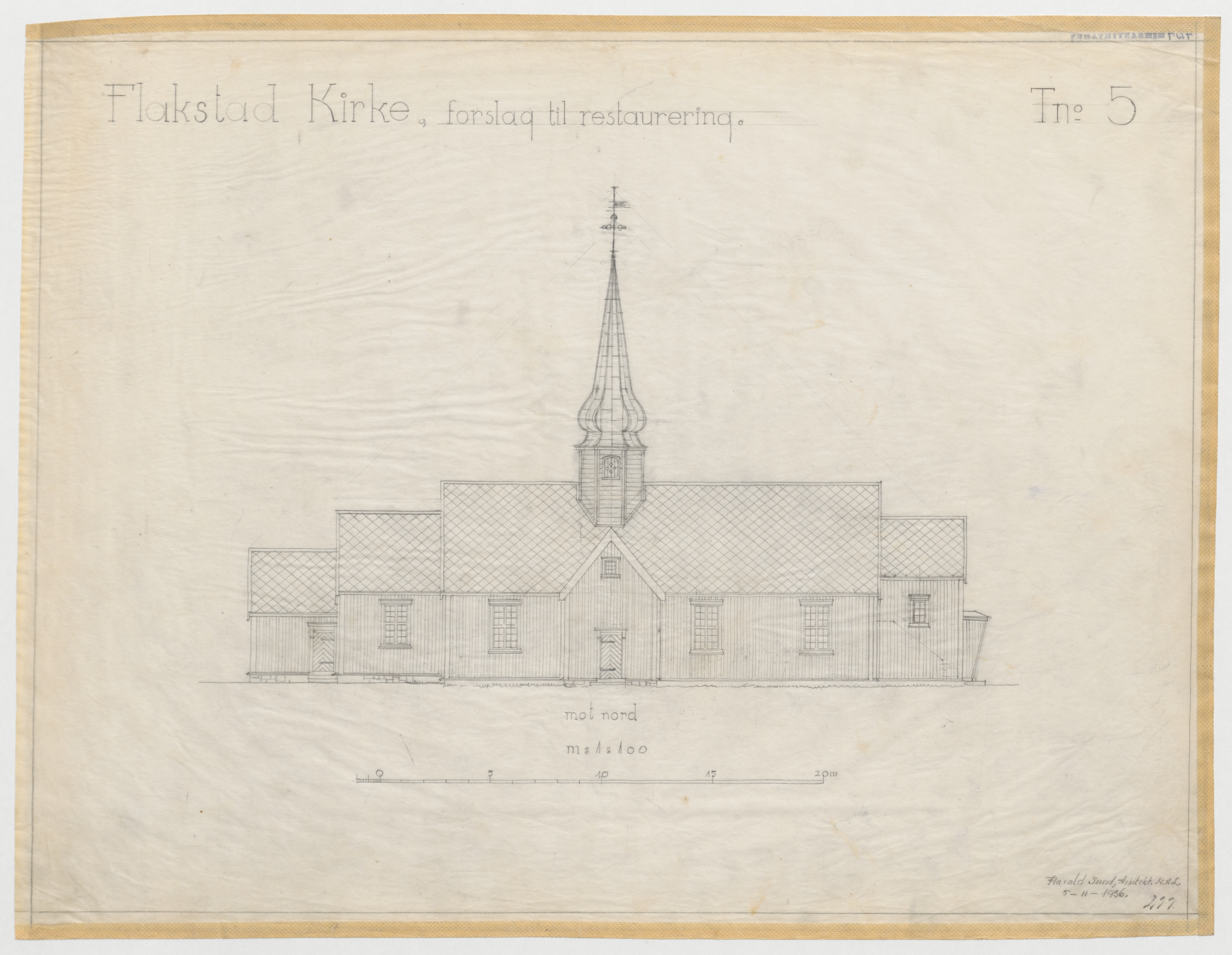

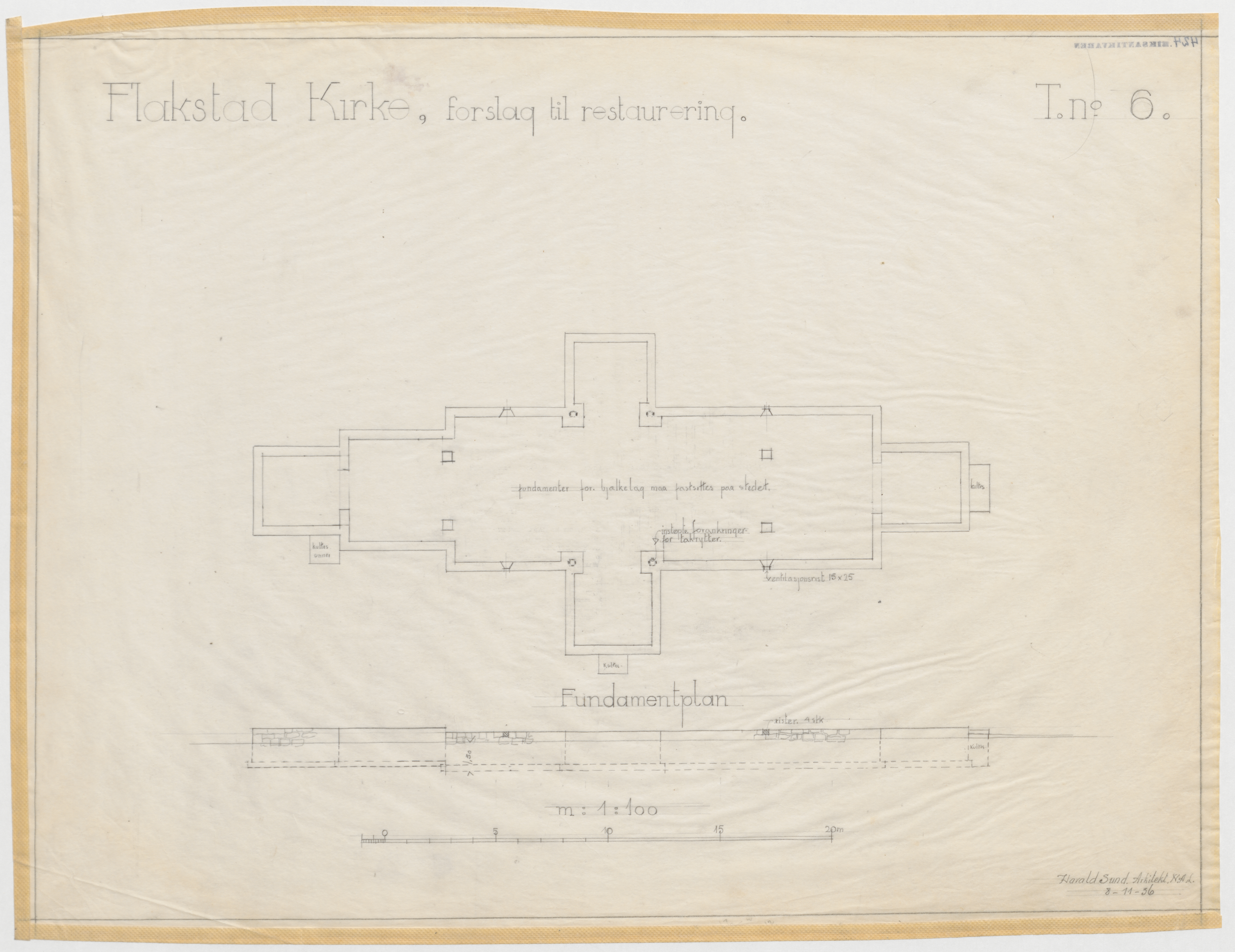

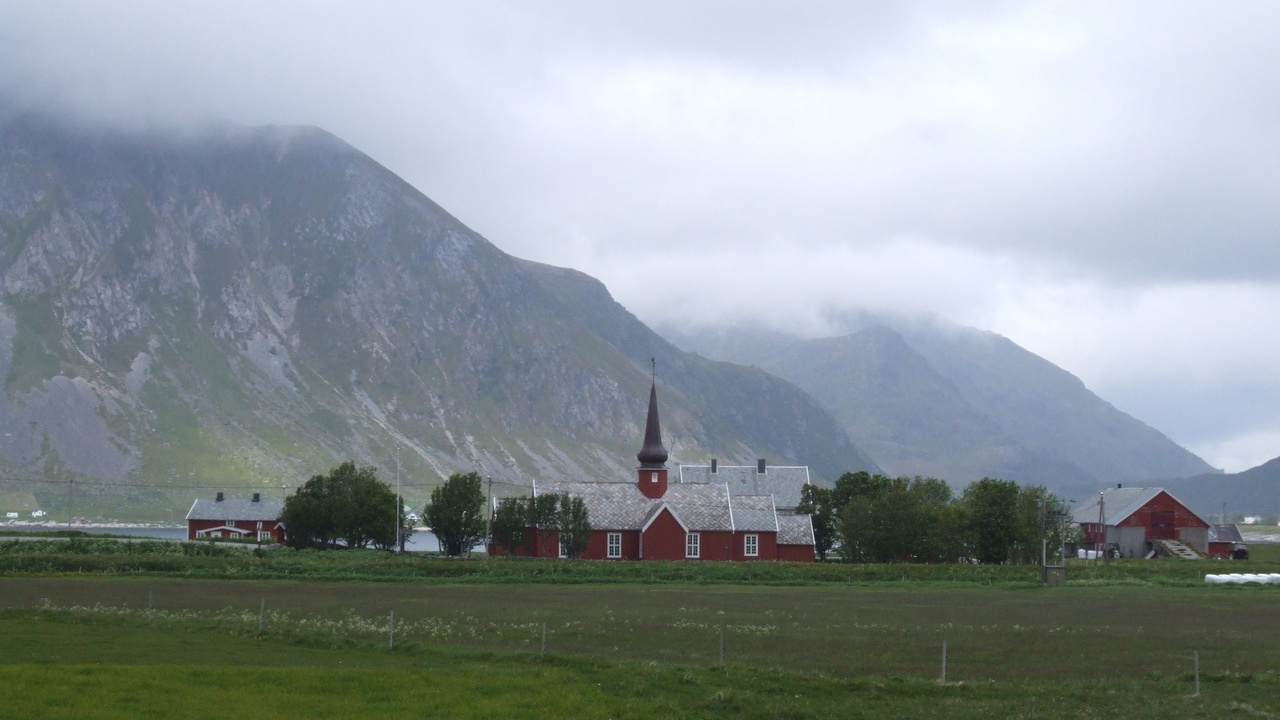

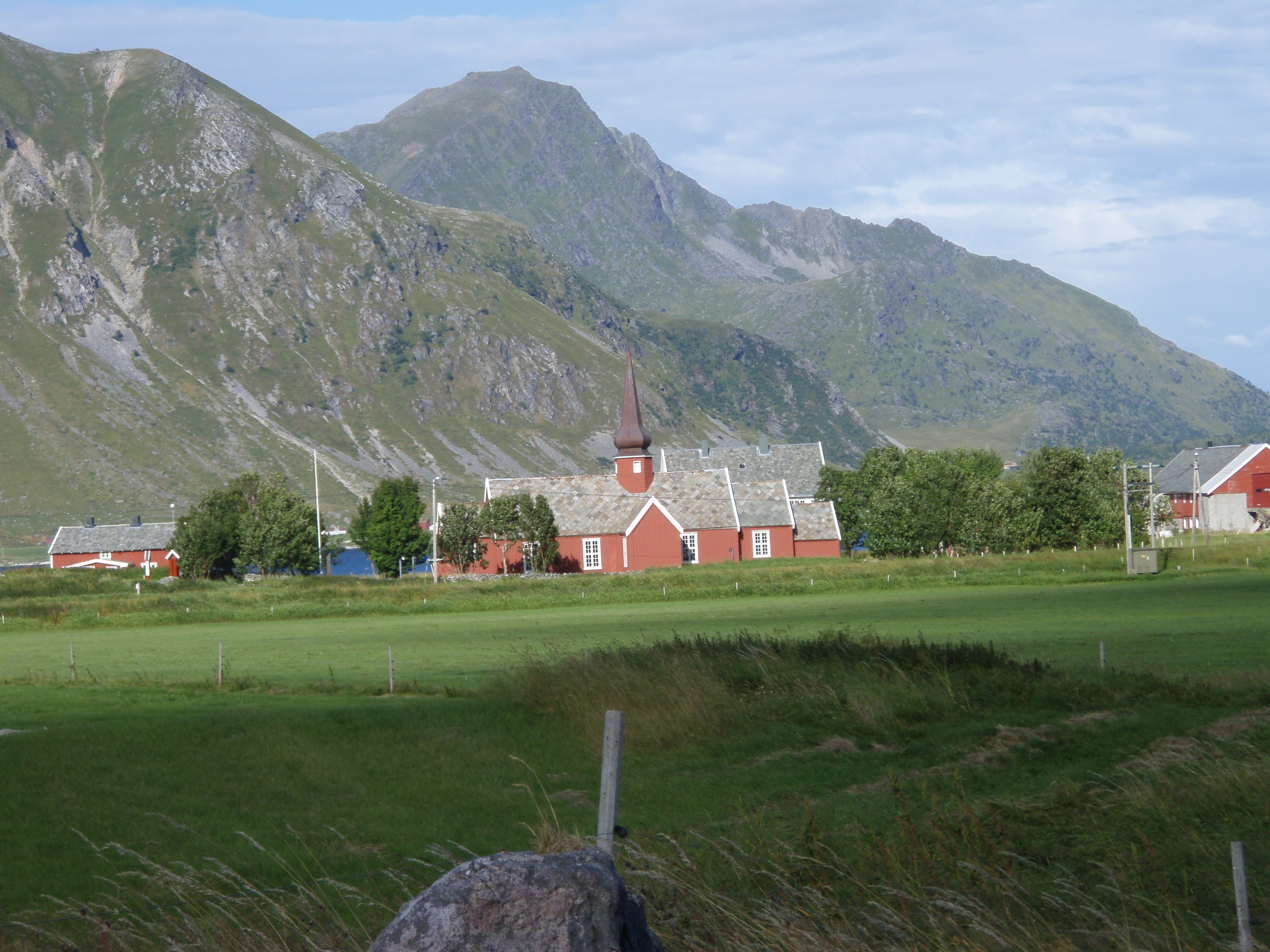

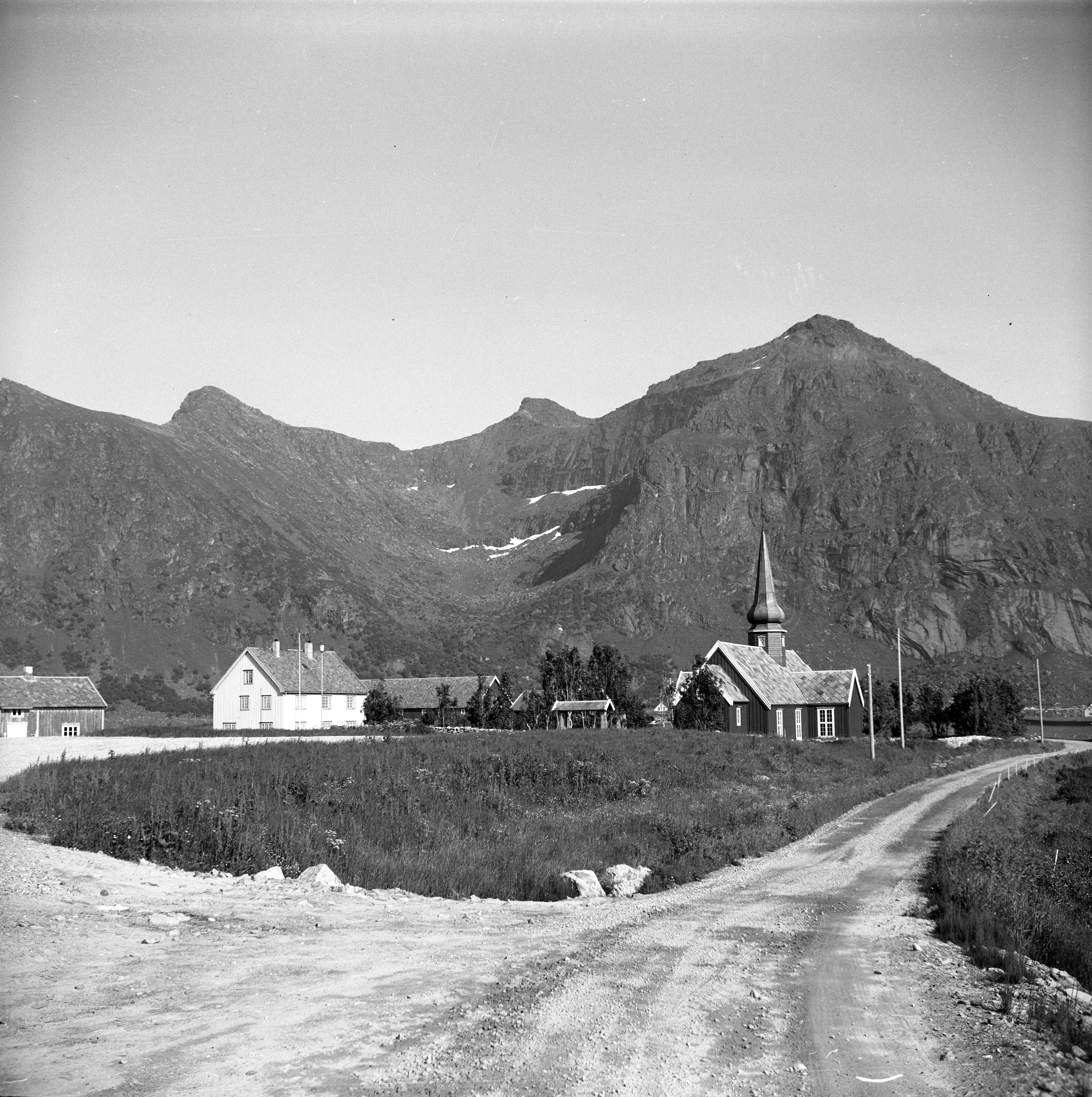

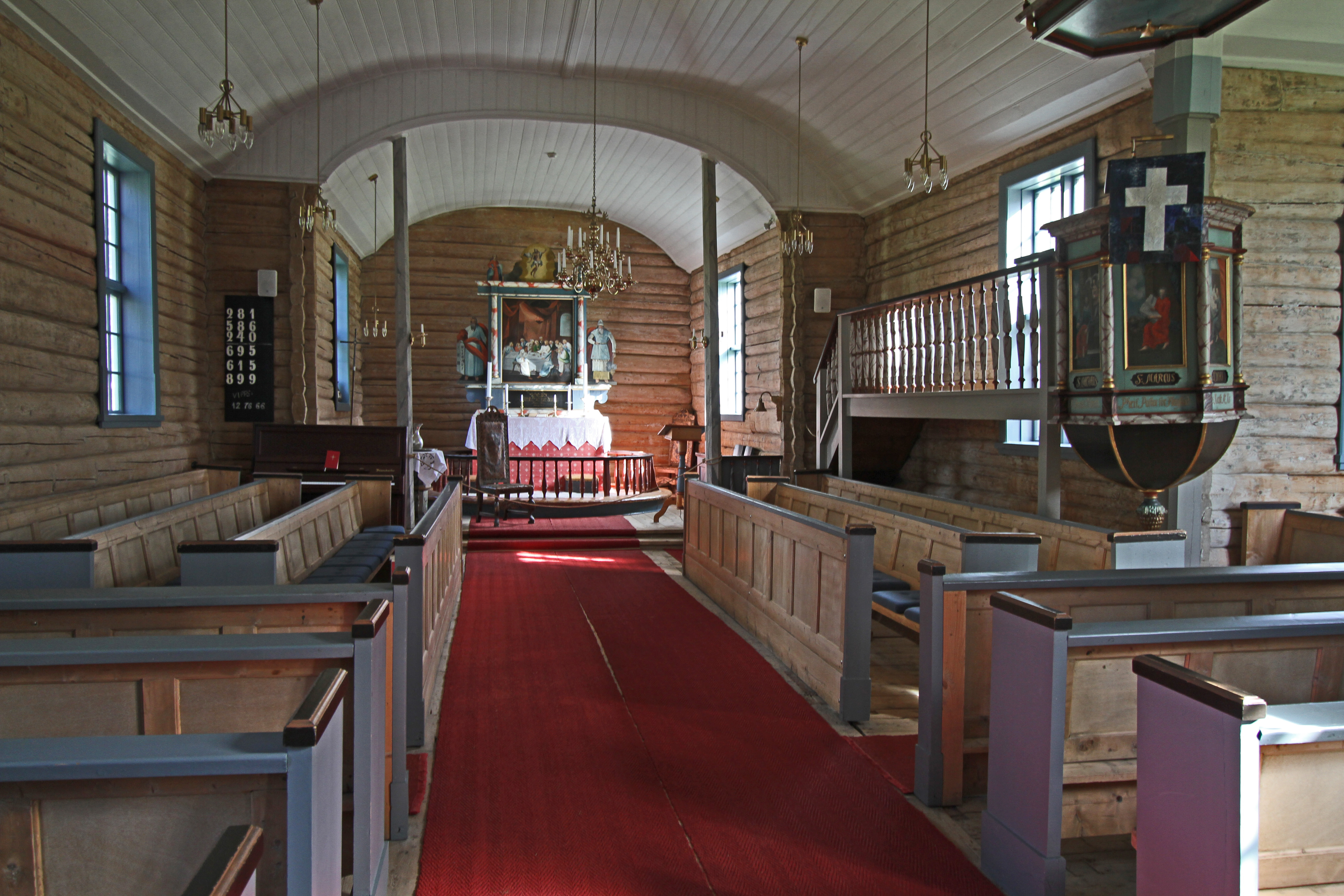

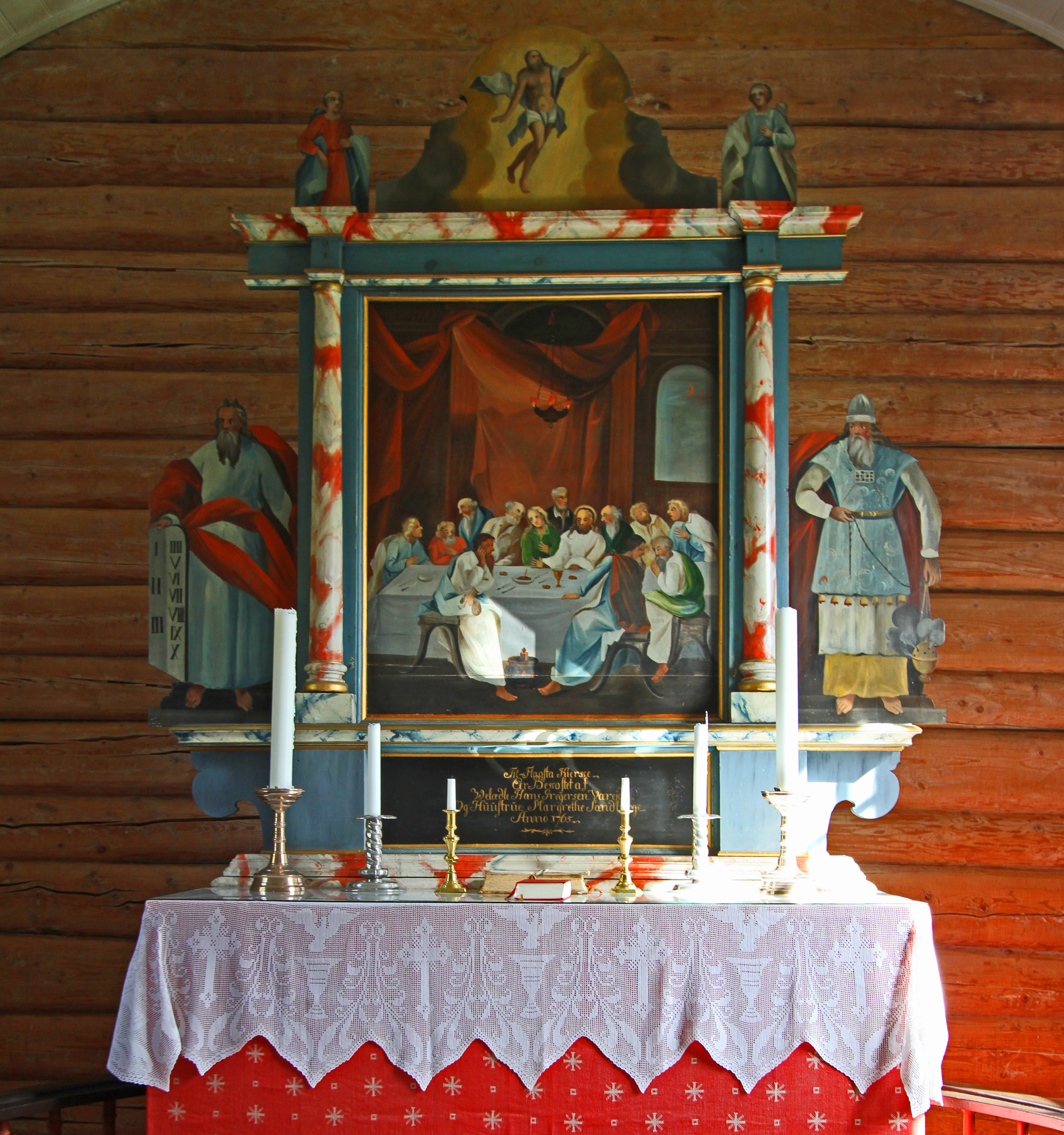

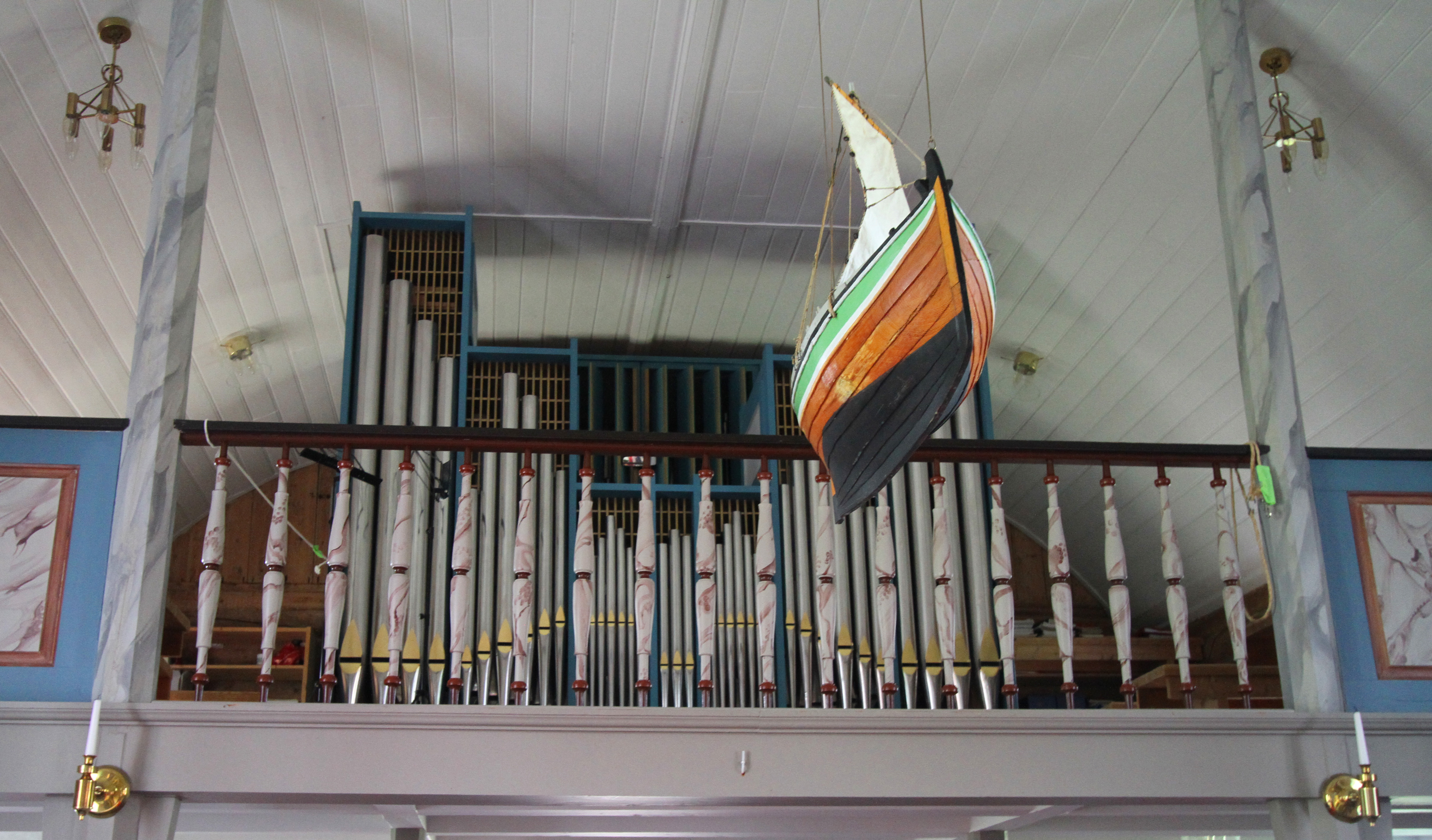

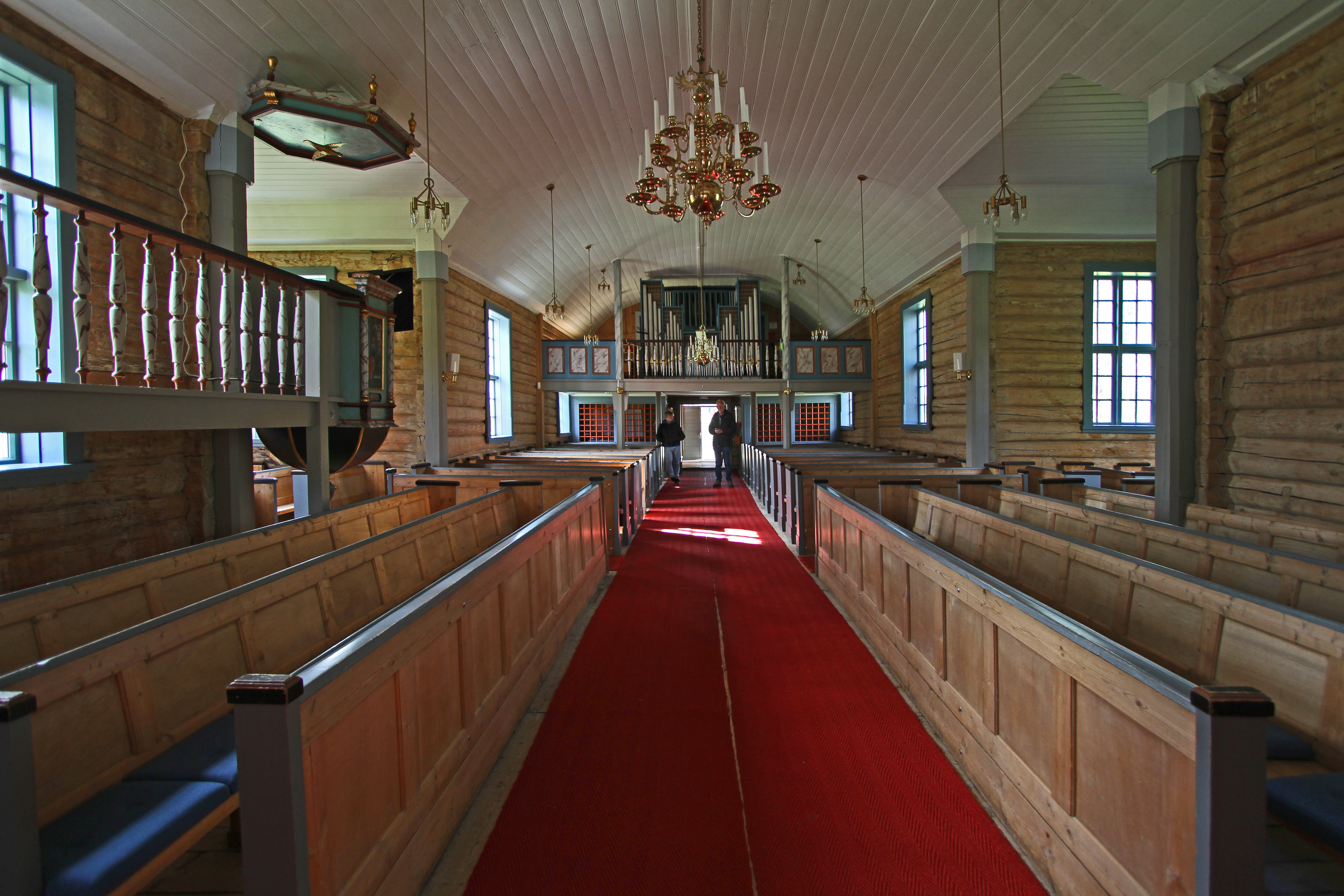

== See also ==
- List of churches in Sør-Hålogaland
