= Flakstad Municipality =

Municipality in Nordland, Norway

Flakstad Municipality Flakstad kommune
- Municipality
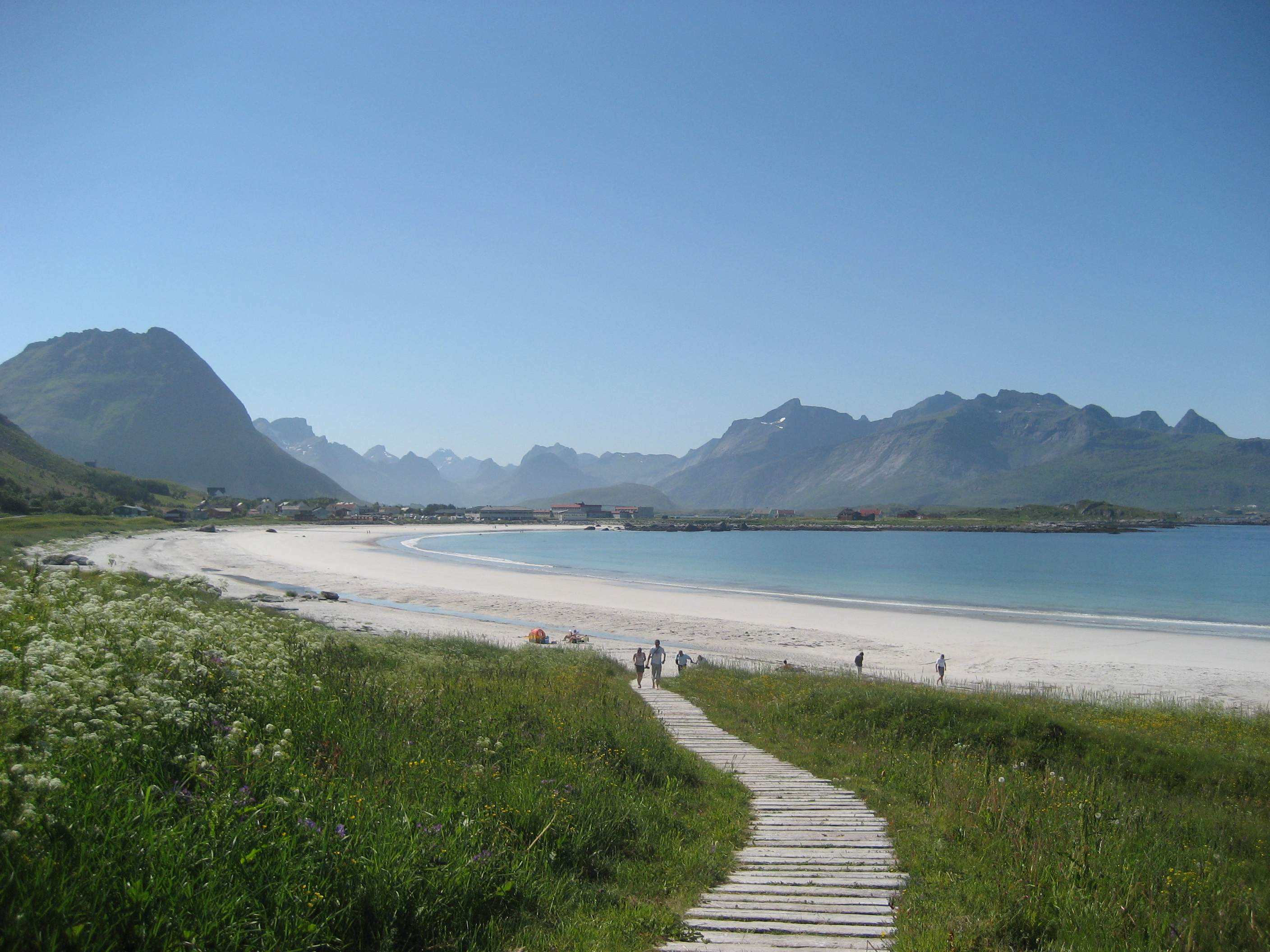
- View of a beach in Flakstad

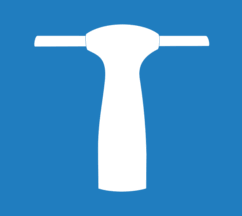
- Flag Coat of arms

- Nordland within Norway

- Flakstad within Nordland
- Coordinates: 68°04′45″N 13°16′28″E
- Country: Norway
- County: Nordland
- District: Lofoten
- Established: 1 Jan 1838
  - Created as: Formannskapsdistrikt
- Disestablished: 1 Jan 1964
  - Succeeded by: Moskenes Municipality
- Re-established: 1 Jan 1976
  - Preceded by: Moskenes Municipality
- Administrative centre: Ramberg

Government
  - Mayor (2023): Einar Benjaminsen (LL)

Area
  - Total: 178.54 km^{2} (68.93 sq mi)
  - Land: 169.23 km^{2} (65.34 sq mi)
  - Water: 9.31 km^{2} (3.59 sq mi) 5.2%
  - Rank: #312 in Norway
- Highest elevation: 938.71 m (3,079.8 ft)

Population (2024)
  - Total: 1,229
  - Rank: #318 in Norway
  - Density: 6.9/km^{2} (18/sq mi)
  - Change (10 years): ▼ −10.2%
- Demonym: Flakstadfjerding

Official language
  - Norwegian form: Neutral
- Time zone: UTC+01:00 (CET)
  - Summer (DST): UTC+02:00 (CEST)
- ISO 3166 code: NO-1859
- Website: Official website

Flakstad is a municipality in Nordland county, Norway. It is part of the traditional district of the island group Lofoten. The administrative centre of the municipality is the village of Ramberg. Other villages in the municipality include Fredvang, Napp, Nusfjord, Sund, and Vareid.

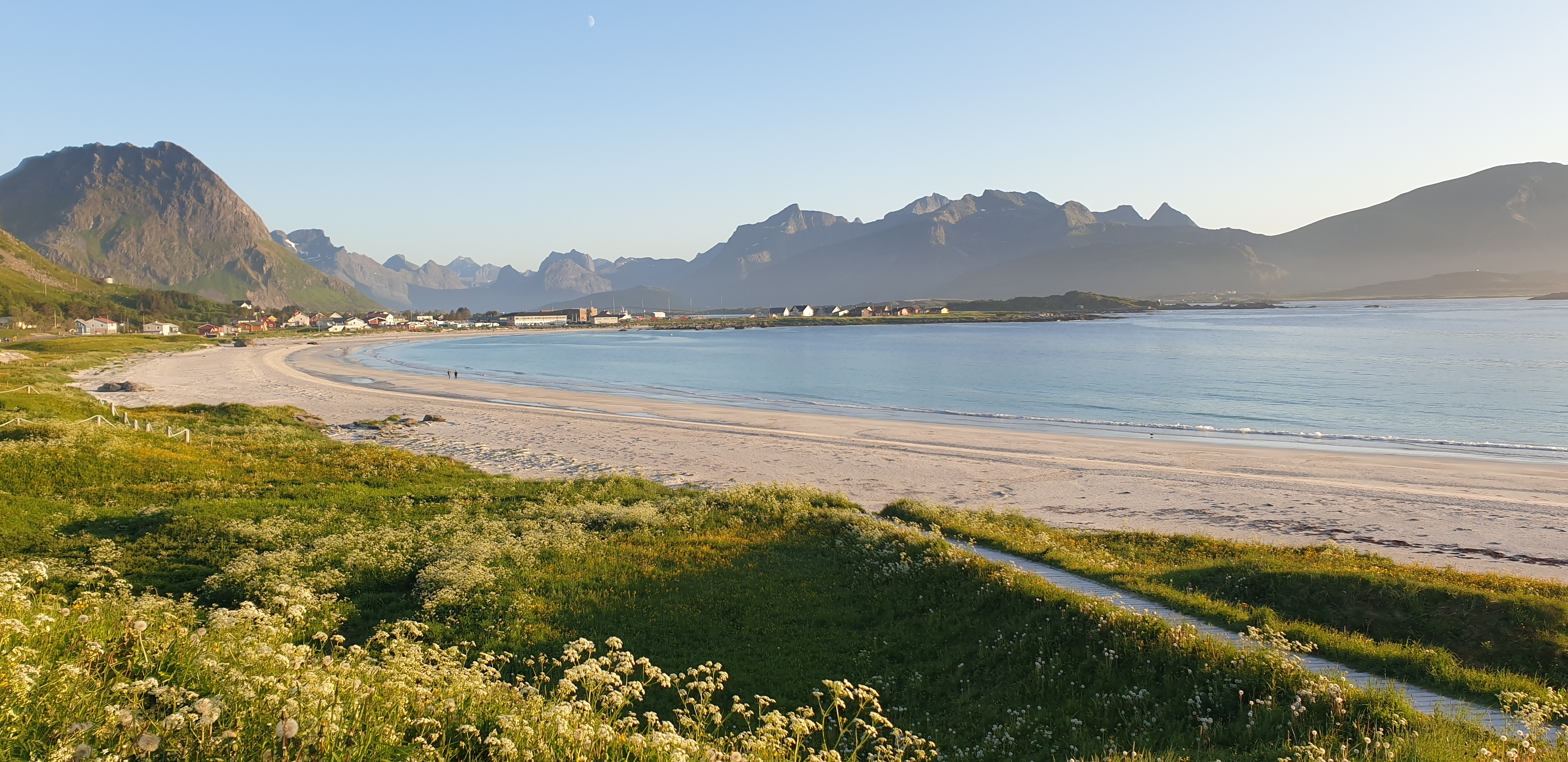
Ramberg

The municipality is located in the Lofoten Islands and comprises the entire island of Flakstadøya and the northern part of the island of Moskenesøya, plus many smaller islets surrounding the main islands. The European route E10 highway runs across the whole municipality.

The 179-square-kilometre (69 sq mi) municipality is the 312th largest by area out of the 357 municipalities in Norway. Flakstad Municipality is the 318th most populous municipality in Norway with a population of 1,229. The municipality's population density is 6.9 inhabitants per square kilometre (18/sq mi) and its population has decreased by 10.2% over the previous 10-year period.

== General information ==
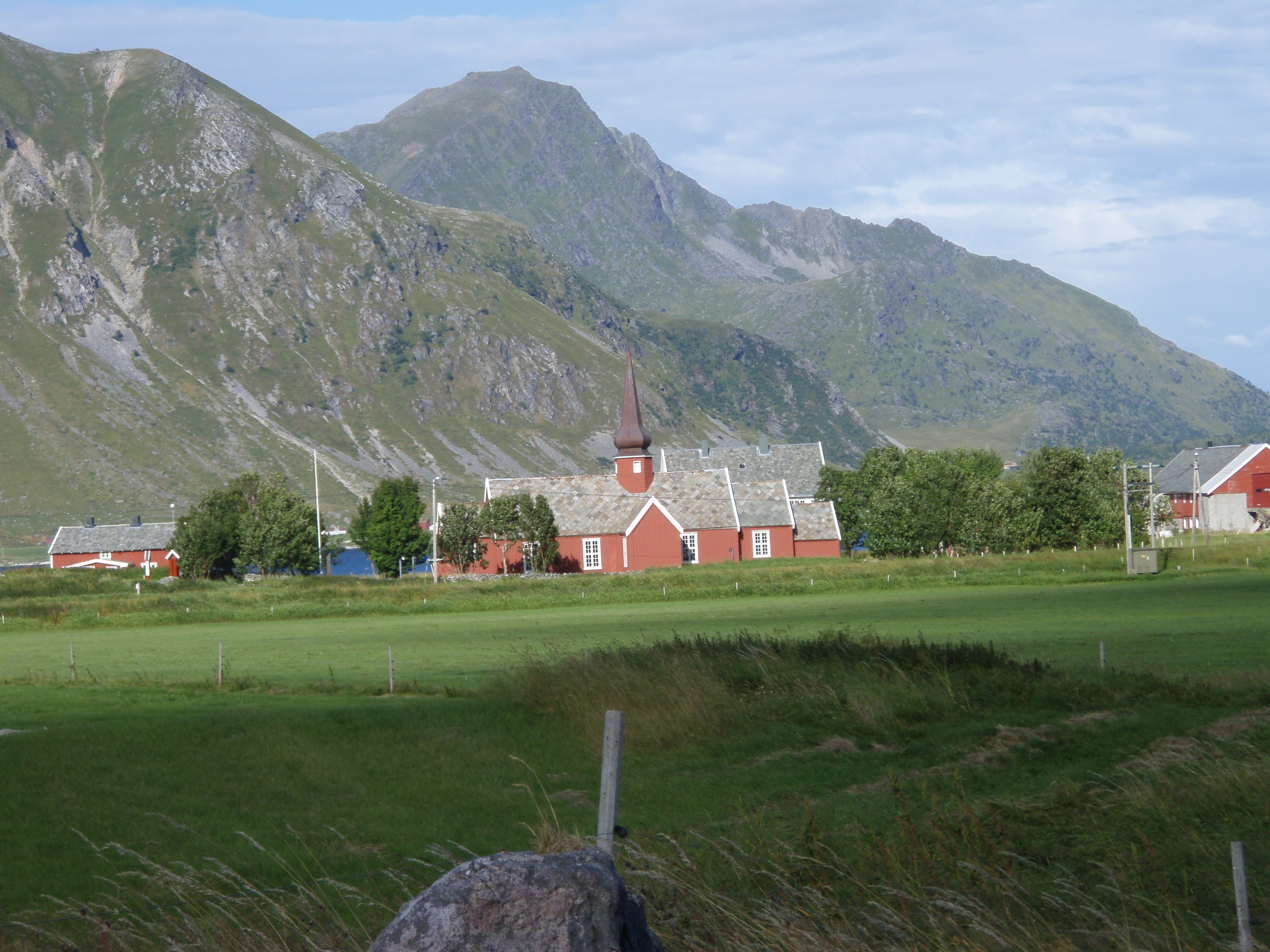
Flakstad church

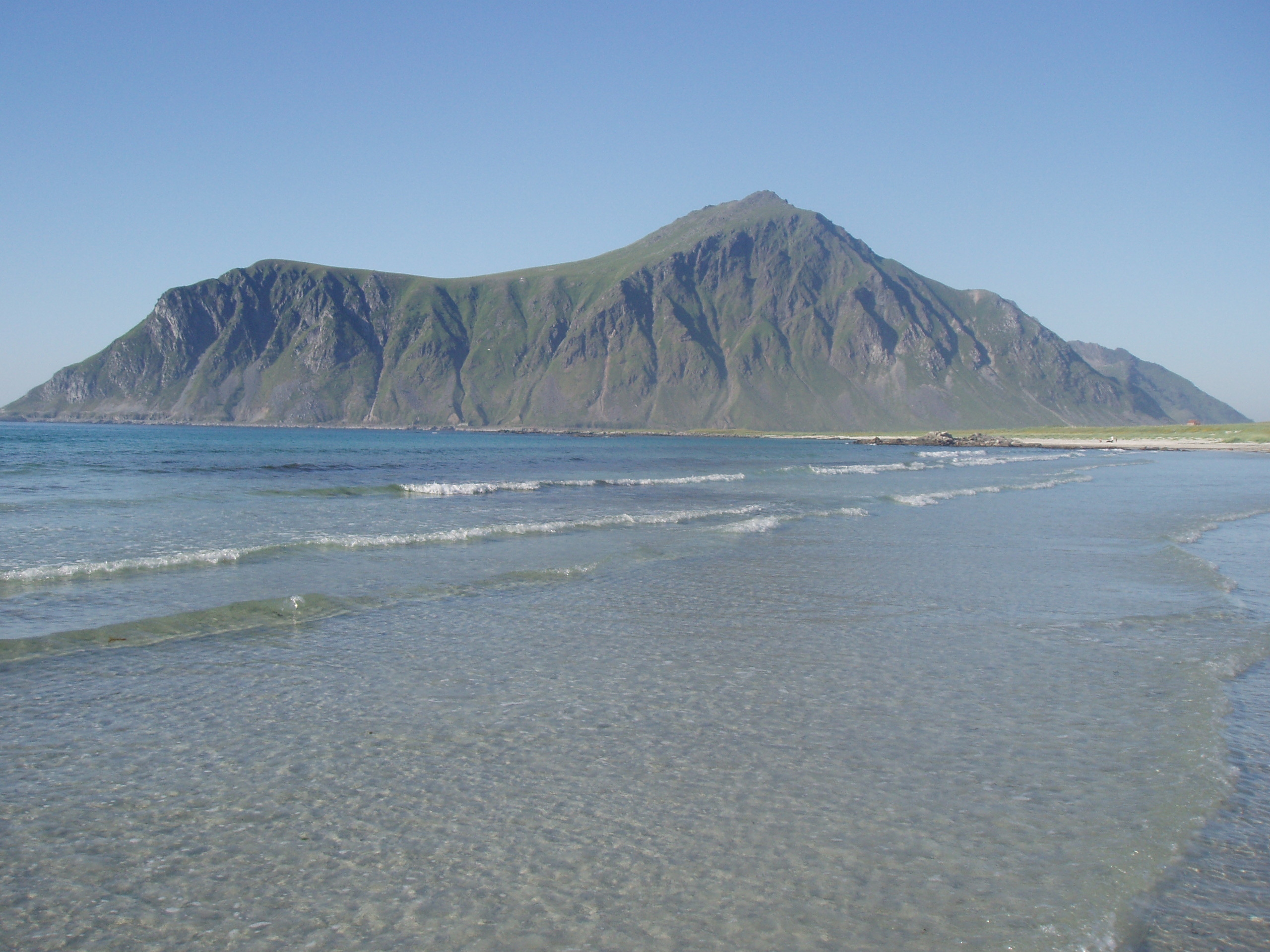
Skagsanden beach, Flakstad

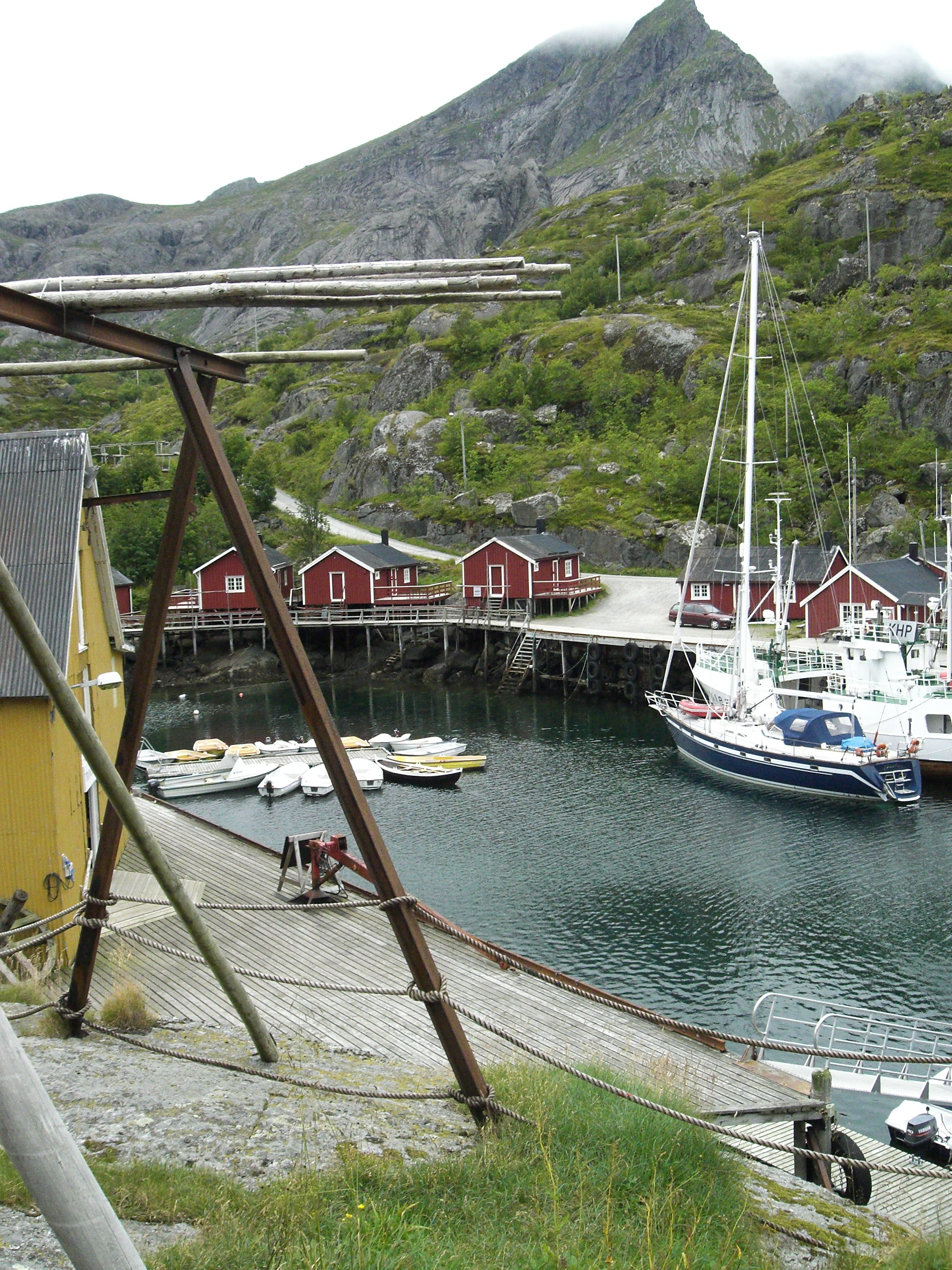
Nusfjord is a small harbor with traditional rorbus.

The municipality of Flakstad was established on 1 January 1838 (see formannskapsdistrikt law). On 1 July 1916, the southern part of the municipality (population: 1,306) was separated to form the new Moskenes Municipality. This left Flakstad with 1,667 residents.

During the 1960s, there were many municipal mergers across Norway due to the work of the Schei Committee. On 1 January 1964, Flakstad Municipality (population: 2,067) was merged into the neighboring Moskenes Municipality (population: 2,001), creating a new, larger Moskenes Municipality. This merger, however, only lasted for twelve years. On 1 January 1976, the merger was undone with Moskenes Municipality (population: 1,705) and Flakstad Municipality (population: 2,007) becoming separate municipalities once again.

=== Name ===
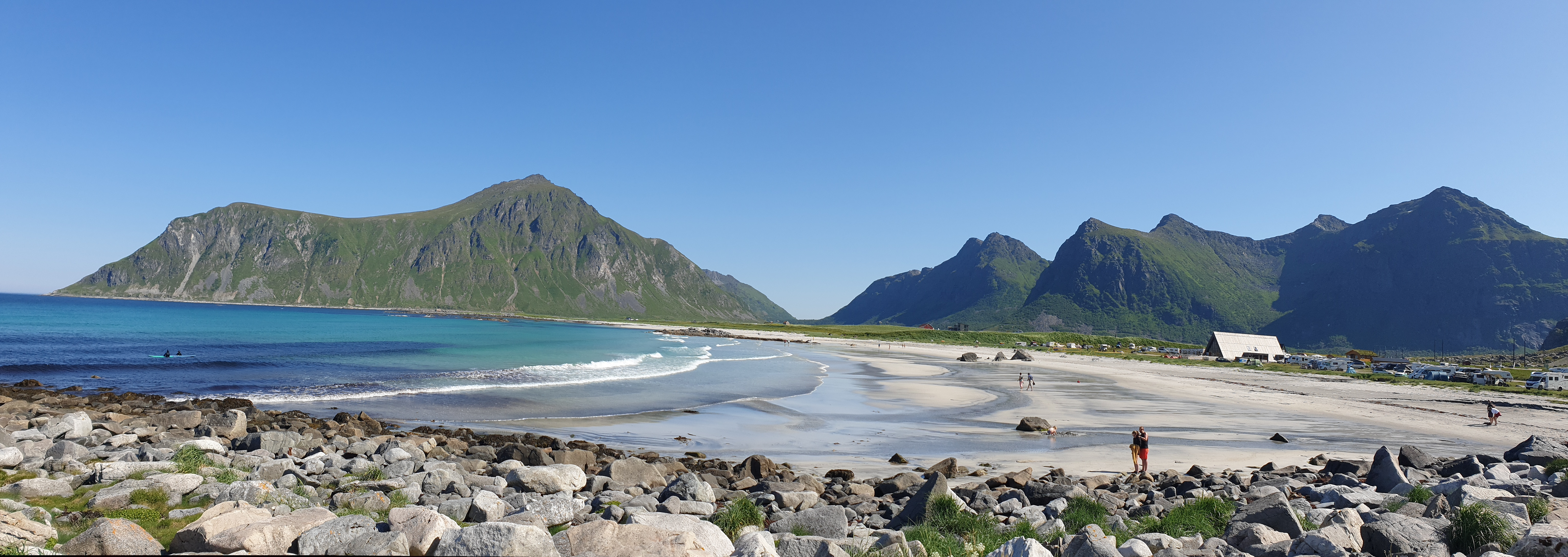
Flakstad

The municipality (originally the parish) is named after the old Flakstad farm (Old Norse: Flakstaðir or Flatarstaðir) since the first Flakstad Church was built there. The first element of the name is uncertain. It may come from the word flak which may have meant "reckless". Another option is that it derived from the word flag which meant "rock wall", possibly referring to the large cliff near the church site. The last element is the plural form of staðr which means "homestead", "abode", or "farm".

=== Coat of arms ===
The coat of arms was granted on 14 July 1989. The official blazon is "Azure, a mooring bollard argent" (Norwegian: I blått en sølv tørnbolt). This means the arms have a blue field (background) and the charge is a mooring bollard which is a type of fixed device used for tying a hawser line from a boat to the dock. The mooring bollard has a tincture of argent which means it is commonly colored white, but if it is made out of metal, then silver is used. The blue color in the field symbolizes the importance of the sea and the mooring bollard was chosen to represent the municipality's seafaring history. The arms were designed by Jorunn Thomassen and Jarle Henriksen.

=== Churches ===
The Church of Norway has one parish (sokn) within Flakstad Municipality. It is part of the Lofoten prosti (deanery) in the Diocese of Sør-Hålogaland.

Churches in Flakstad Municipality
Parish (sokn)	Church name	Location of the church	Year built
Flakstad	Flakstad Church	Flakstad	1780

== Economy ==
The municipality's economy is dominated by fishing. The fishing fleet mainly consists of small boats. There are also several fish farm in Flakstad. There is some agriculture in Flakstad, but mostly cattle and sheep farming rather than growing crops.

== Government ==
Flakstad Municipality is responsible for primary education (through 10th grade), outpatient health services, senior citizen services, welfare and other social services, zoning, economic development, and municipal roads and utilities. The municipality is governed by a municipal council of directly elected representatives. The mayor is indirectly elected by a vote of the municipal council. The municipality is under the jurisdiction of the Salten og Lofoten District Court and the Hålogaland Court of Appeal.

=== Municipal council ===
The municipal council (Kommunestyre) of Flakstad Municipality is made up of 11 representatives that are elected to four year terms. The tables below show the current and historical composition of the council by political party.

Flakstad kommunestyre 2023–2027
Party name (in Norwegian)	Number of representatives
Labour Party (Arbeiderpartiet)	2
Centre Party (Senterpartiet)	4
Socialist Left Party (Sosialistisk Venstreparti)	1
Flakstad District List (Flakstad distriktsliste)	4
Total number of members:	11

Flakstad kommunestyre 2019–2023
Party name (in Norwegian)	Number of representatives
Labour Party (Arbeiderpartiet)	3
Centre Party (Senterpartiet)	5
Socialist Left Party (Sosialistisk Venstreparti)	1
Flakstad District List (Flakstad distriktsliste)	1
Lofoten List (yes to municipal mergers) (Lofotlista (ja til kommunesammenslåing))	1
Total number of members:	11

Flakstad kommunestyre 2015–2019
Party name (in Norwegian)	Number of representatives
Labour Party (Arbeiderpartiet)	2
Green Party (Miljøpartiet De Grønne)	1
Centre Party (Senterpartiet)	5
Flakstad District List (Flakstad distriktsliste)	3
Total number of members:	11

Flakstad kommunestyre 2011–2015
Party name (in Norwegian)	Number of representatives
Labour Party (Arbeiderpartiet)	2
Progress Party (Fremskrittspartiet)	1
Green Party (Miljøpartiet De Grønne)	1
Centre Party (Senterpartiet)	4
Flakstad District List (Flakstad distriktsliste)	6
Fredvang, Krystad and Skjelfjord municipal list (Fredvang, Krystad og Skjelfjord bygdeliste)	3
Total number of members:	17

Flakstad kommunestyre 2007–2011
Party name (in Norwegian)	Number of representatives
Labour Party (Arbeiderpartiet)	4
Centre Party (Senterpartiet)	2
Flakstad district list (Flakstad Distriktsliste)	8
Fredvang and Krystad local list (Fredvang og Krystad bygdeliste)	3
Total number of members:	17

Flakstad kommunestyre 2003–2007
Party name (in Norwegian)	Number of representatives
Labour Party (Arbeiderpartiet)	2
Centre Party (Senterpartiet)	6
Flakstad district list (Flakstad Distriktsliste)	7
Fredvang and Krystad local list (Fredvang og Krystad bygdeliste)	2
Total number of members:	17

Flakstad kommunestyre 1999–2003
Party name (in Norwegian)	Number of representatives
Labour Party (Arbeiderpartiet)	3
Centre Party (Senterpartiet)	2
Flakstad district list (Flakstad Distriktsliste)	9
Fredvang and Krystad local list (Fredvang og Krystad bygdeliste)	3
Total number of members:	17

Flakstad kommunestyre 1995–1999
Party name (in Norwegian)	Number of representatives
Labour Party (Arbeiderpartiet)	2
Centre Party (Senterpartiet)	3
Socialist Left Party (Sosialistisk Venstreparti)	1
Flakstad district list (Flakstad Distriktsliste)	8
Fredvang and Krystad local list (Fredvang og Krystad bygdeliste)	3
Total number of members:	17

Flakstad kommunestyre 1991–1995
Party name (in Norwegian)	Number of representatives
Labour Party (Arbeiderpartiet)	6
Socialist Left Party (Sosialistisk Venstreparti)	1
Flakstad district list (Flakstad Distriktsliste)	6
Fredvang and Krystad local list (Fredvang og Krystad bygdeliste)	4
Total number of members:	17

Flakstad kommunestyre 1987–1991
Party name (in Norwegian)	Number of representatives
Labour Party (Arbeiderpartiet)	6
Conservative Party (Høyre)	3
Flakstad district list (Flakstad Distriktsliste)	5
Fredvang and Krystad local list (Fredvang og Krystad bygdeliste)	3
Total number of members:	17

Flakstad kommunestyre 1983–1987
Party name (in Norwegian)	Number of representatives
Labour Party (Arbeiderpartiet)	6
Conservative Party (Høyre)	2
Flakstad district list (Flakstad Distriktsliste)	6
Non-party common list for Fredvang-Krystad (Upolitisk fellesliste for Fredvang-Krystad)	3
Total number of members:	17

Flakstad kommunestyre 1979–1983
Party name (in Norwegian)	Number of representatives
Labour Party (Arbeiderpartiet)	4
Flakstad district list (Flakstad Distriktsliste)	10
Non-party common list for Fredvang-Krystad area (Upolitisk fellesliste for Fredvang, Krystad og omegn)	3
Total number of members:	17

Flakstad kommunestyre 1976–1979
Party name (in Norwegian)	Number of representatives
Flakstad Common List (Flakstad Samlingsliste)	13
Non-party Common List Fredvang-Krystad (Upolitisk Fellesliste Fredvang-Krystad)	4
Total number of members:	17
Note: On 1 January 1976, Flakstad Municipality was separated from Moskenes Municipality.

Flakstad herredsstyre 1959–1963
Party name (in Norwegian)	Number of representatives
List of workers, fishermen, and small farmholders (Arbeidere, fiskere, småbrukere liste)	2
Local List(s) (Lokale lister)	11
Total number of members:	13
Note: On 1 January 1964, Flakstad Municipality became part of Moskenes Municipality.

Flakstad herredsstyre 1955–1959
Party name (in Norwegian)	Number of representatives
Labour Party (Arbeiderpartiet)	2
List of workers, fishermen, and small farmholders (Arbeidere, fiskere, småbrukere liste)	11
Total number of members:	13

Flakstad herredsstyre 1951–1955
Party name (in Norwegian)	Number of representatives
Labour Party (Arbeiderpartiet)	1
List of workers, fishermen, and small farmholders (Arbeidere, fiskere, småbrukere liste)	11
Total number of members:	12

Flakstad herredsstyre 1947–1951
Party name (in Norwegian)	Number of representatives
Labour Party (Arbeiderpartiet)	2
Joint List(s) of Non-Socialist Parties (Borgerlige Felleslister)	2
Local List(s) (Lokale lister)	8
Total number of members:	12

Flakstad herredsstyre 1945–1947
Party name (in Norwegian)	Number of representatives
List of workers, fishermen, and small farmholders (Arbeidere, fiskere, småbrukere liste)	6
Local List(s) (Lokale lister)	6
Total number of members:	12

Flakstad herredsstyre 1937–1941*
Party name (in Norwegian)	Number of representatives
Labour Party (Arbeiderpartiet)	1
List of workers, fishermen, and small farmholders (Arbeidere, fiskere, småbrukere liste)	3
Joint List(s) of Non-Socialist Parties (Borgerlige Felleslister)	8
Total number of members:	12
Note: Due to the German occupation of Norway during World War II, no elections were held for new municipal councils until after the war ended in 1945.

=== Mayors ===
The mayor (Norwegian: ordfører) of Flakstad Municipality is the political leader of the municipality and the chairperson of the municipal council. Here is a list of people who have held this position:

- 1838–1869: Unknown
- 1870–1872: Mr. Osten
- 1873–1877: Arnt Arntsen
- 1878–1880: Mikal Berg
- 1881–1884: B. Lorentzen
- 1885–1886: Rev. Anders Pedersen Grytnæs
- 1887–1890: Rev. Jonas Rein Landmark
- 1891–1892: Bernhard Dahl
- 1893–1894: Jakob Pedersen Næsland
- 1895–1898: Peder Nilsen Aa
- 1899–1904: Johannes Ludvig Johannessen
- 1905–1907: Rev. Einar Johan Braëm Amlie
- 1908–1914: A. Hammerø
- 1914–1919: Tollef Johan Rasmussen
- 1920–1922: Rev. Sverre Widsten
- 1922–1924: Kristian Gjertsen
- 1924–1926: Johan Ludvig Johansen
- 1926–1929: Martin Knudsen
- 1929–1938: K. Rørtveit
- 1938–1941: Johan Kvalheim
- 1941–1945: K. Rørtveit
- 1945–1945: Johan Kvalheim
- 1945–1946: Olav Jensen
- 1946–1959: Øystein Krogtoft (Ap)
- 1959–1963: Asbjørn Aune (Ap)
- (1964–1975: Part of Moskenes Municipality)
- 1975–1983: Gunnar Rørtveit (LL/Ap)
- 1983–1986: Carl Leon Johnsen (LL)
- 1986–1987: Alf Ivar Samuelsen (Ap)
- 1987–1991: Jan Rigan (Ap)
- 1991–1999: Willy Arntzen (LL)
- 1999–2003: Erling Sigurd Sandnes (LL)
- 2003–2005: Alf Ivar Samuelsen (Ap)
- 2005–2007: Ann-Helen Fjeldstad Jusnes (Ap)
- 2007–2015: Stein Iversen (Sp)
- 2015–2019: Hans Fredrik Sørdal (Ap)
- 2019–2023: Trond Kroken (Sp)
- 2023–present: Einar Benjaminsen (LL)

== Geography ==
Located near the southern end of the Lofoten archipelago, Flakstad comprises all of the island of Flakstadøya and the northern part of the island of Moskenesøya. The islands are connected by the Fredvang Bridges and the Kåkern Bridge. The large lake Solbjørnvatnet lies on the northern part of Moskenesøya in Flakstad. The highest point in the municipality is the 938.71-metre (3,079.8 ft) tall mountain Stjerntinden.

Vestvågøy Municipality lies to the northeast on the island of Vestvågøya, the Vestfjorden lies to the southeast, the Moskenes Municipality lies to the southwest on the island of Moskenesøya, and the Norwegian Sea lies to the northwest.

=== Climate ===
Climate data for Ramberg, Flakstad 1961-90
Month	Jan	Feb	Mar	Apr	May	Jun	Jul	Aug	Sep	Oct	Nov	Dec	Year
Daily mean °C (°F)	−0.3 (31.5)	−0.5 (31.1)	0.2 (32.4)	2.3 (36.1)	6.3 (43.3)	9.5 (49.1)	11.9 (53.4)	12.0 (53.6)	8.8 (47.8)	5.8 (42.4)	2.6 (36.7)	0.5 (32.9)	4.9 (40.8)
Average precipitation mm (inches)	175 (6.9)	144 (5.7)	126 (5.0)	95 (3.7)	60 (2.4)	61 (2.4)	85 (3.3)	91 (3.6)	155 (6.1)	218 (8.6)	175 (6.9)	195 (7.7)	1,580 (62.2)
Source: Norwegian Meteorological Institute

== Notable people ==
- Fredrik Arentz Krog (1844 in Flakstad – 1923), a Norwegian barrister
- Gina Krog (1847 in Flakstad – 1916), a Norwegian suffragist, teacher, liberal politician, and editor
- Birger Eriksen (1875 in Flakstad – 1958), a Norwegian officer and commander of Oscarsborg Fortress in WWII
- Sigurd Lund Hamran (1902 in Flakstad – 1977), a Norwegian politician, Mayor, and deputy Mayor of Moskenes Municipality between 1937 & 1961
- Alf Ivar Samuelsen (1942 in Flakstad – 2014), a Norwegian politician and Mayor of Flakstad Municipality
