= Flakstadøya =

Island in Nordland, Norway

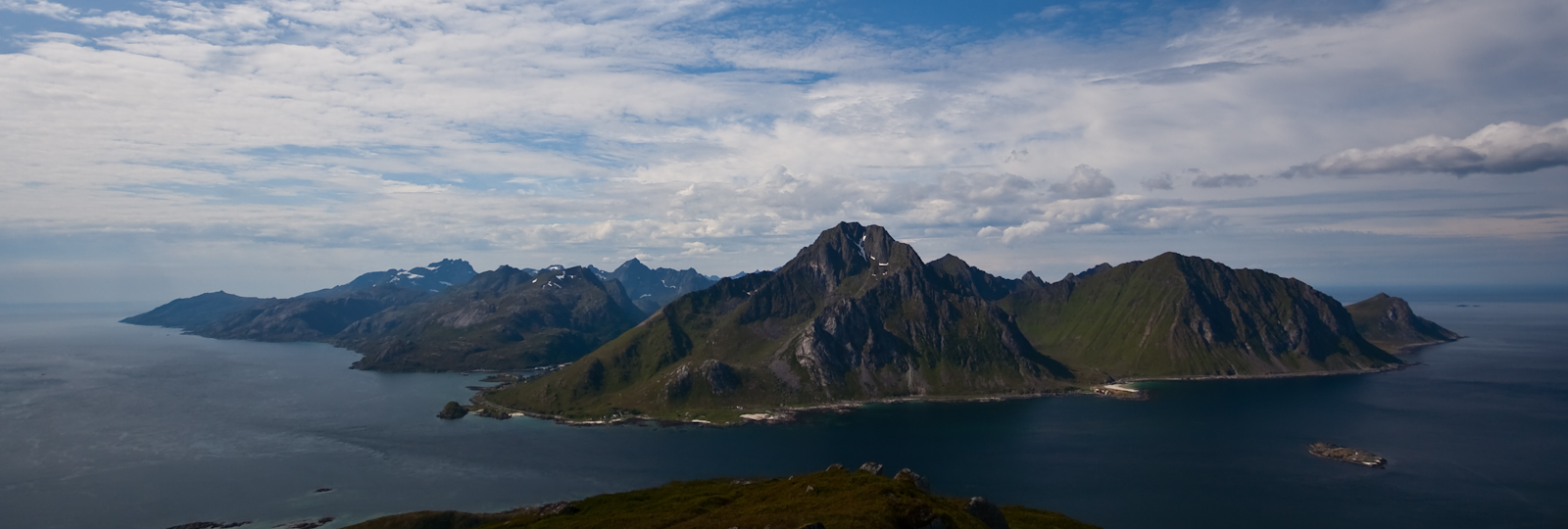
- Interactive map of Flakstadøya

Geography
- Location: Nordland, Norway
- Coordinates: 68.0670°N 13.2988°E
- Archipelago: Lofoten
- Area: 110 km^{2} (42 sq mi)
- Length: 20 km (12 mi)
- Width: 8.5 km (5.28 mi)
- Highest elevation: 931 m (3054 ft)
- Highest point: Stjerntinden

Administration
- Norway
- County: Nordland
- Municipality: Flakstad Municipality

Demographics
- Population: 1119
- Pop. density: 10/km^{2} (30/sq mi)

Flakstadøya is an island in the Lofoten archipelago in Nordland county, Norway. The entire island lies within Flakstad Municipality with the Vestfjorden on the east side of the island and the Norwegian Sea on the west side of the island.

== Geography ==
The island is connected to the neighbouring island of Moskenesøya (to the south and west) by the Kåkern Bridge and Fredvang Bridges. It is connected to the island of Vestvågøya (to the northeast) through the undersea Nappstraum Tunnel. The European route E10 highway crosses the island and connects to the neighbouring islands.

There are several villages on the island including the administrative centre of the municipality, Ramberg, and others such as Fredvang, Nusfjord, Sund, Vikten, and Napp.

== Gallery ==
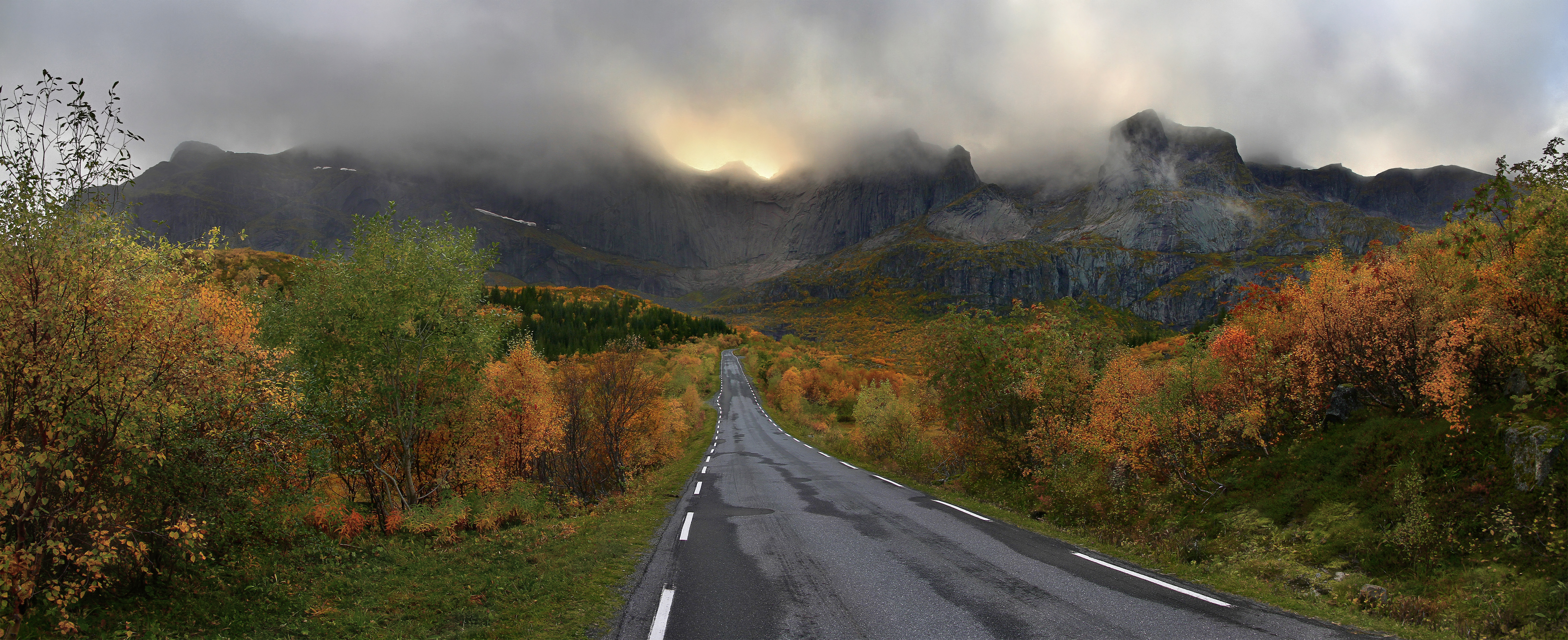
A mountain massif of Flakstadøya island backgrounding the road to Nusfjord village.

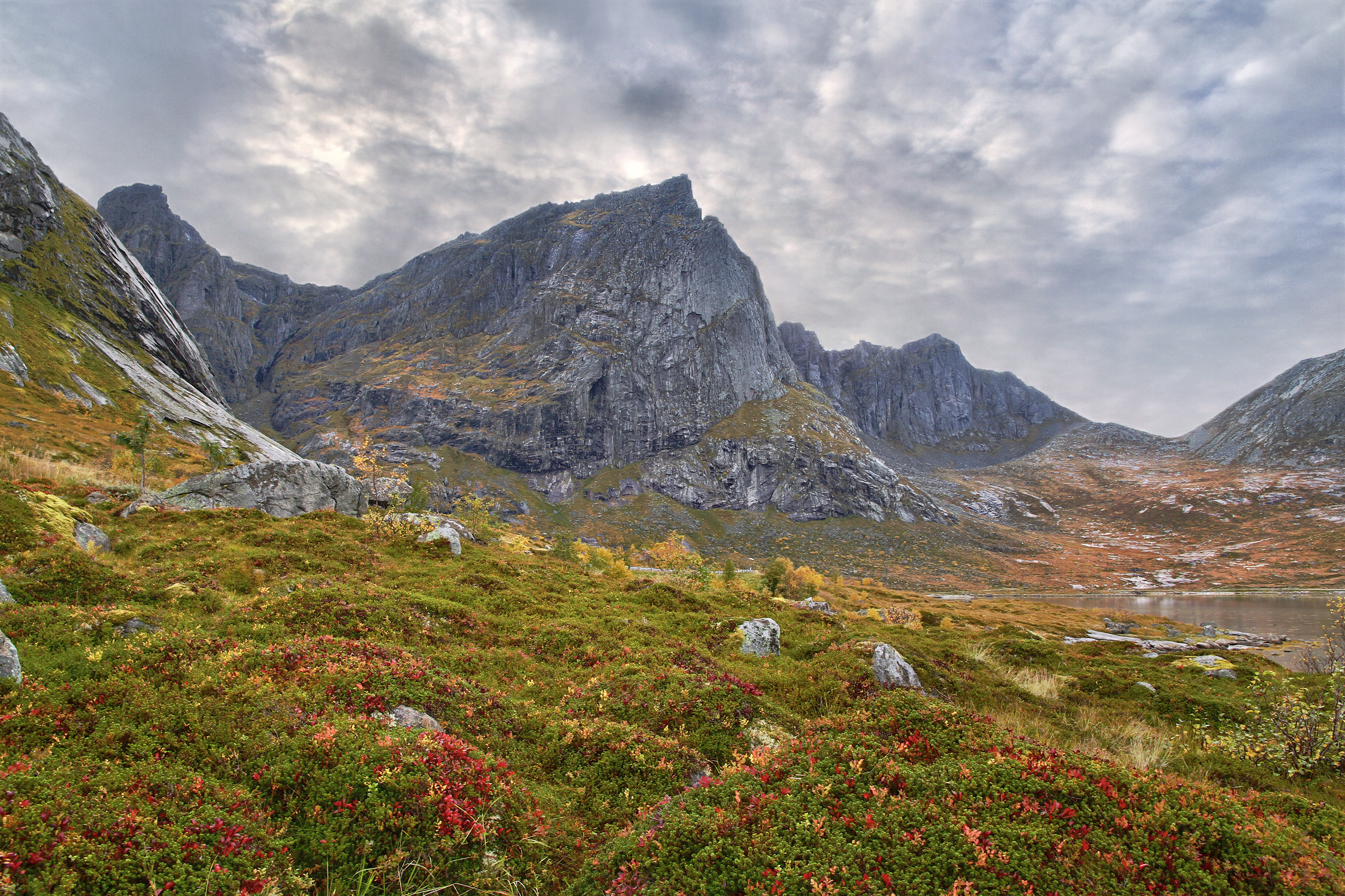
The eastfaces of Stabben, Stortinden and Moltinden in the island of Flakstadøya

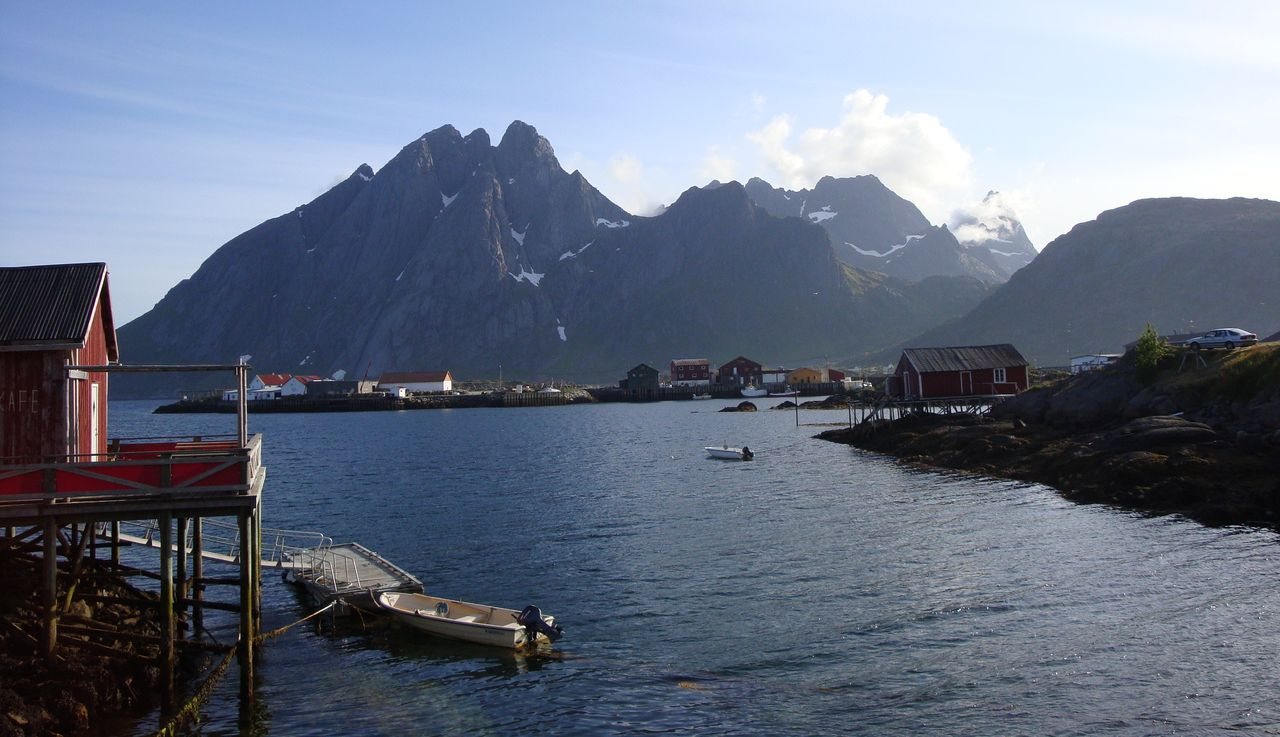
View of the village of Sund

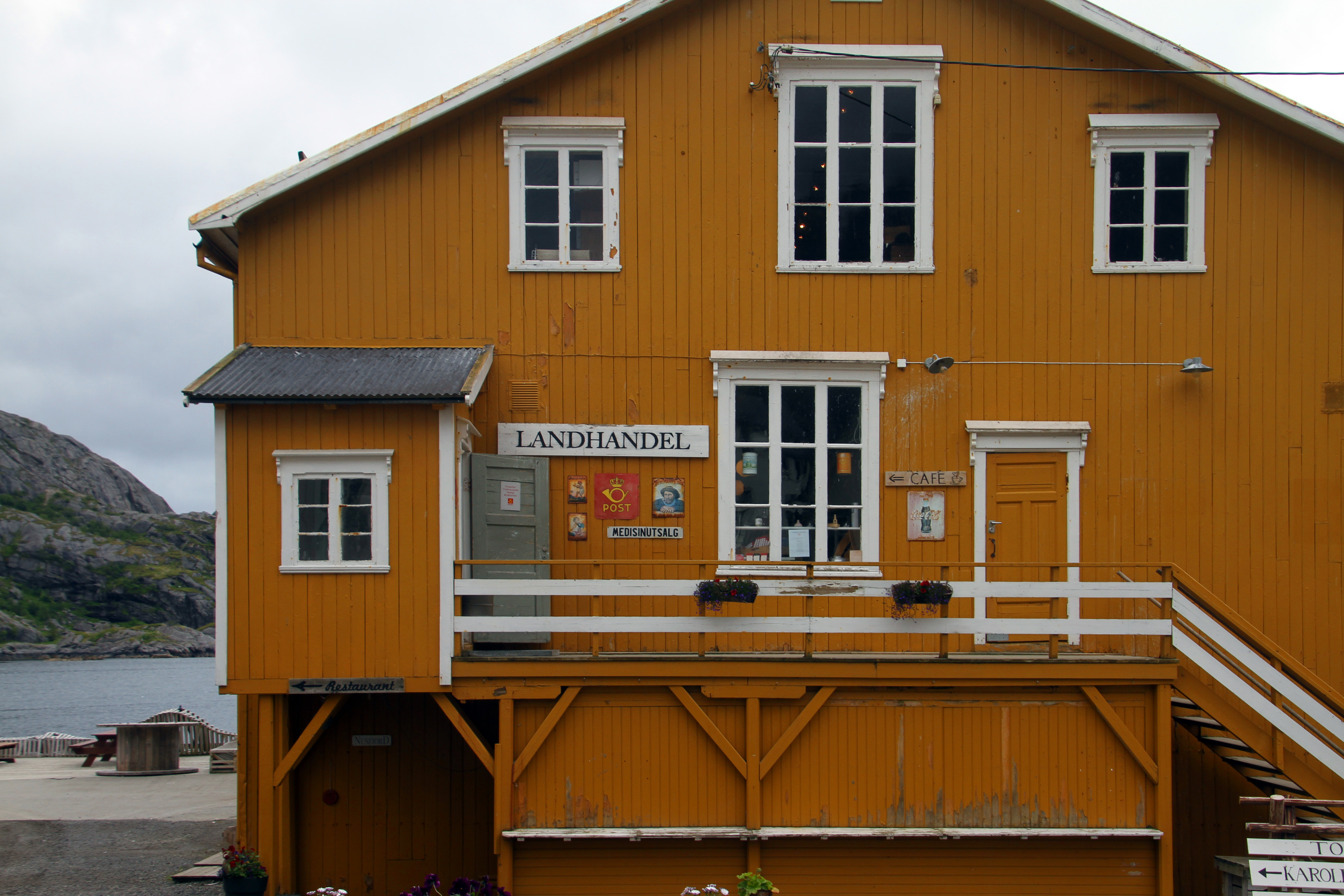
Store in Nusfjord

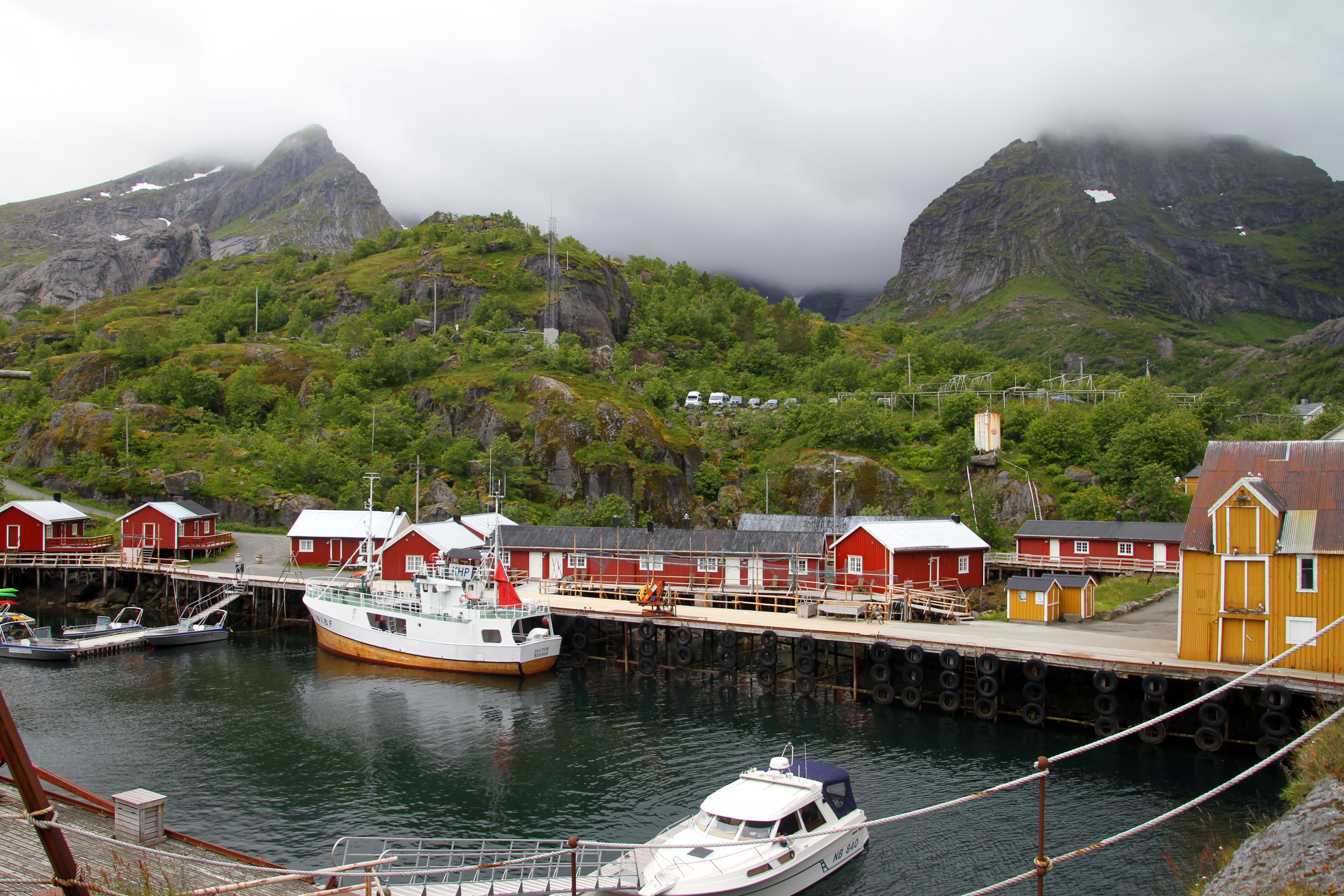
Port of Nusfjord
