= Lofotodden National Park =

National park in Norway

- Lofotodden nasjonalpark
- IUCN category II (national park)
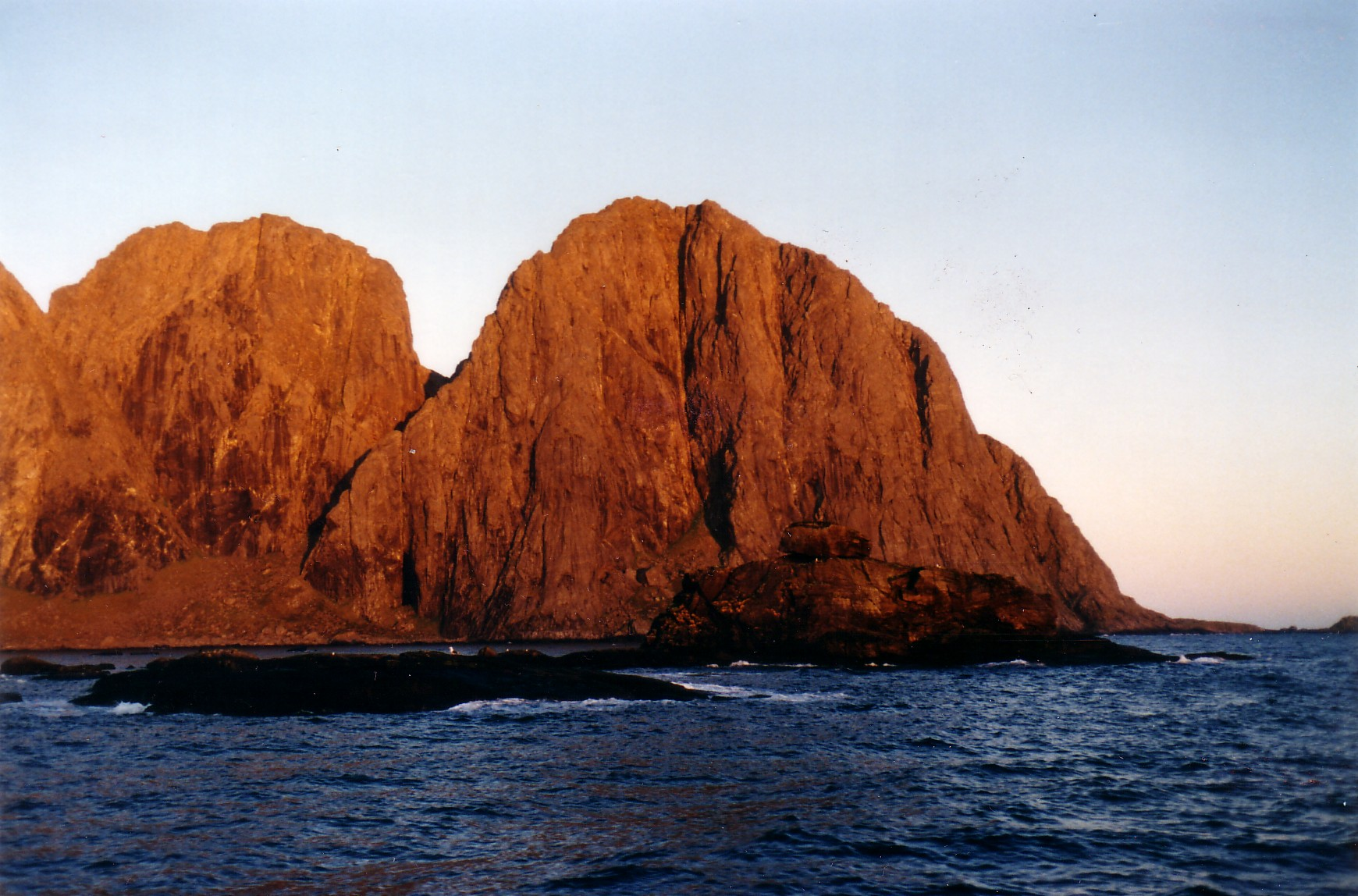
- Southwest of Moskenesøya Island with Kollhellaren Cave
- Interactive map of Lofotodden National Park
- Location: Nordland, Norway
- Coordinates: 68°1′1″N 13°1′23″E
- Area: 99 km^{2} (38 sq mi)
- Established: 2018

Lofotodden National Park (Norwegian: Lofotodden nasjonalpark) is a national park located in Moskenes Municipality and Flakstad Municipality in Nordland county, Norway. It is located not far from the Arctic Circle on the island of Moskenesøya in the Lofoten archipelago.

Lofotodden National Park was established on 22 June 2018. The national park covers an area of 99 square kilometres (38 sq mi), of which approximately 13 square kilometres (5.0 sq mi) is sea area. It was officially opened by Climate and Environment Minister Ola Elvestuen on 9 June 2019.

== Geography ==
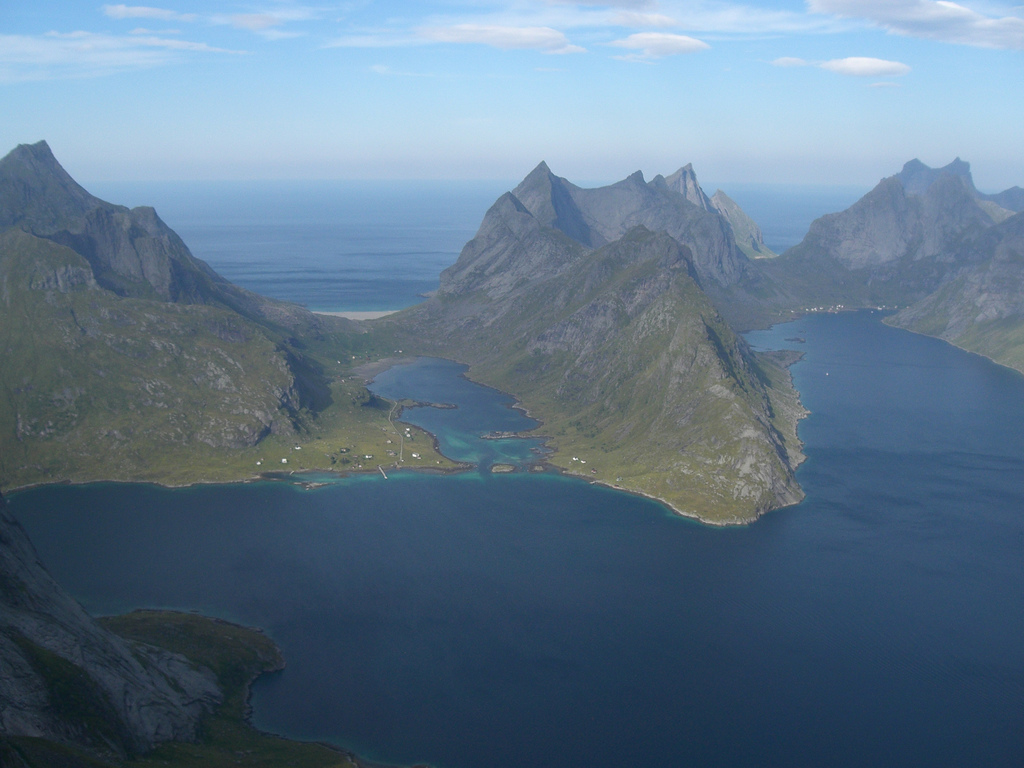

The national park extends approximately 36 kilometres (22 mi) as the crow flies from the islets at the northern end of the island of Moskenesøya to the islands off the southwest coast. The protected area consists mainly of a mountain range with rugged peaks off the rugged west coast of the island, except for the southern part of Moskenes, which is part of the national park. The national park comprises the southern part of the 160-kilometre (99 mi) long mountain range, called Lofotenveggen (translated from Norwegian as "Lofoten Wall").

The jagged massif is made up of volcanic rocks and granite. The highest point in the national park is the mountain Hermannsdalstinden which reaches 1,029 metres (3,376 ft) above sea level, making it the highest peak on Moskenesøya. There are a number of other significant peaks in the national park, ranging in altitude from 500–940 metres (1,640–3,080 ft). Of a total park area of 99 square kilometres (38 sq mi), 13 square kilometres (5.0 sq mi) falls on local bays and fjords, including some smaller islands. The Lofotodden Nature Reserve is located at the southwestern tip of the island of Moskenesøya and comprising the island of Sørholmenand and other smaller islets This nature reserve is an important nesting ground for seabirds and this area is also part of the national park.

== Protection ==
The name of the national park was taken from the name of the historical area of Lofotodden on the island of Moskenesøya. The purpose of the creation of Lofotodden National Park is to preserve the natural, cultural and historical values of the landscape, little affected by human intervention. The park area includes significant and diverse ecosystems, such as rubble forests, bogs, cliffed coast, and sand dunes. Some endangered animal species also live here, such as black guillemot, European shag and some species of gulls. The territory of the national park is also important for various species of plants and fungus.

== Access ==
The rocky terrain of the protected area is very rugged and difficult to access in places, but there are many trails and a few crossings of the mountain range. These tours include, for example, the crossing from Vinstad to the sandy west coast of Bunesstrand or the road from the village of Å along the southern shore of Lake Ågvatnet and over a steep ridge to Lake Stokkvikvatnet and Stokkvika Bay. However, the bay of Stokkvika with the adjacent valley is excluded from the national park because of its specific history: this narrow valley about 2 kilometres (1.2 mi) long was once inhabited, as evidenced by archives from 1634. During the Second World War, there was an equipment warehouse and between 1952 and 1963 the Norwegian Ministry of Defense used the site as a military firing range.

== Gallery ==
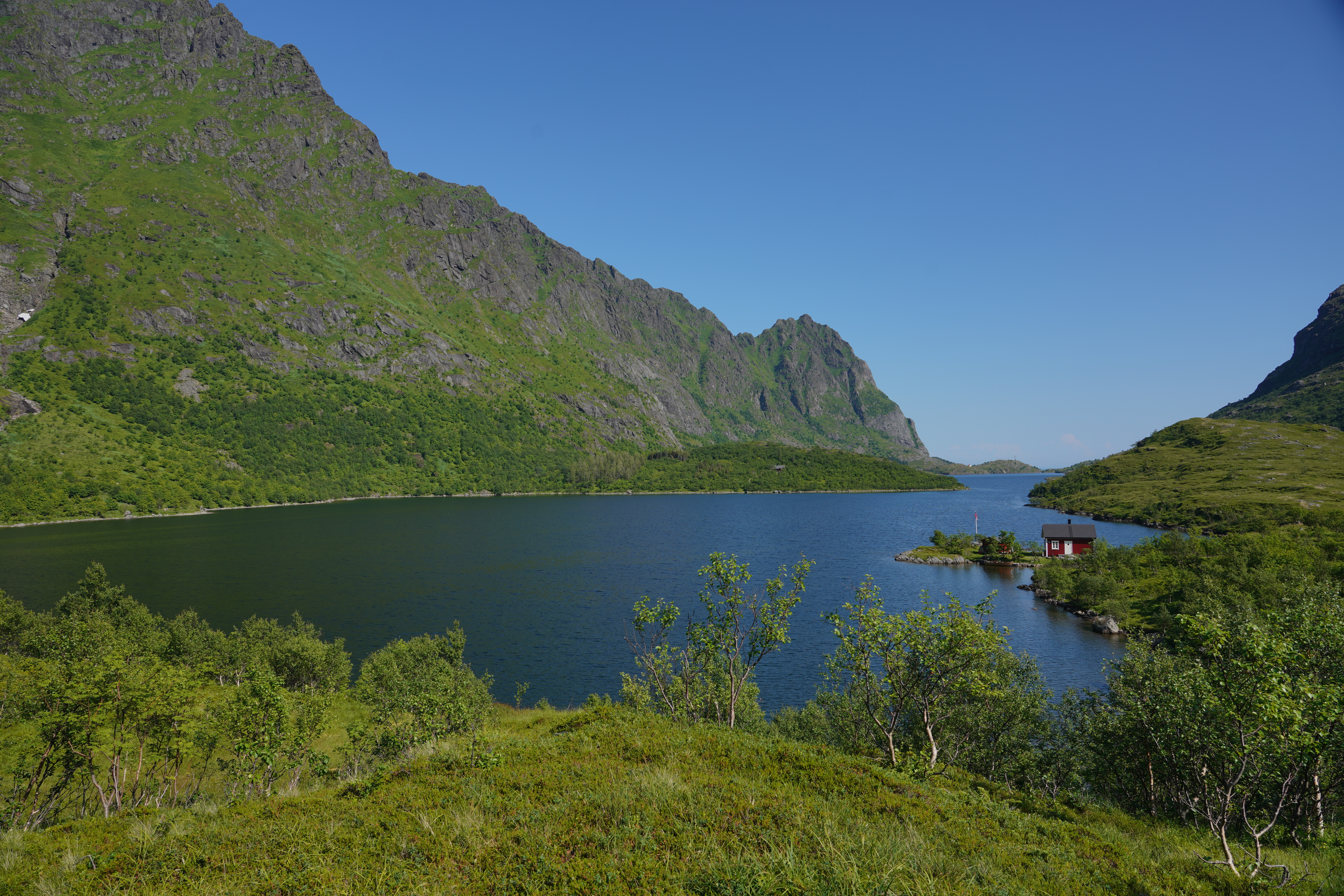
Lake Ågvatnet in Lofotodden national park

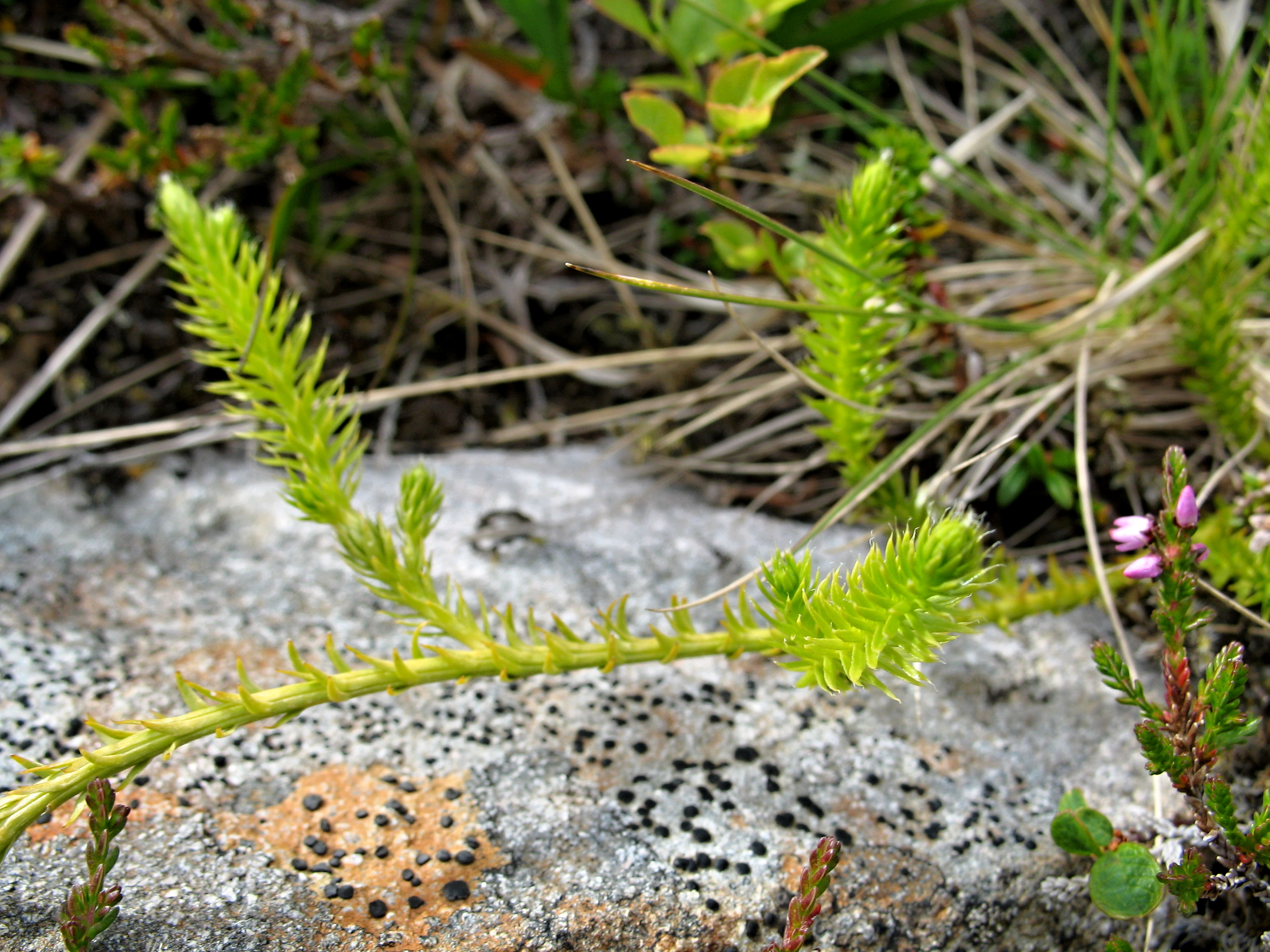
Plavuň in the vegetation on the western shore of Lake Ågvatnet

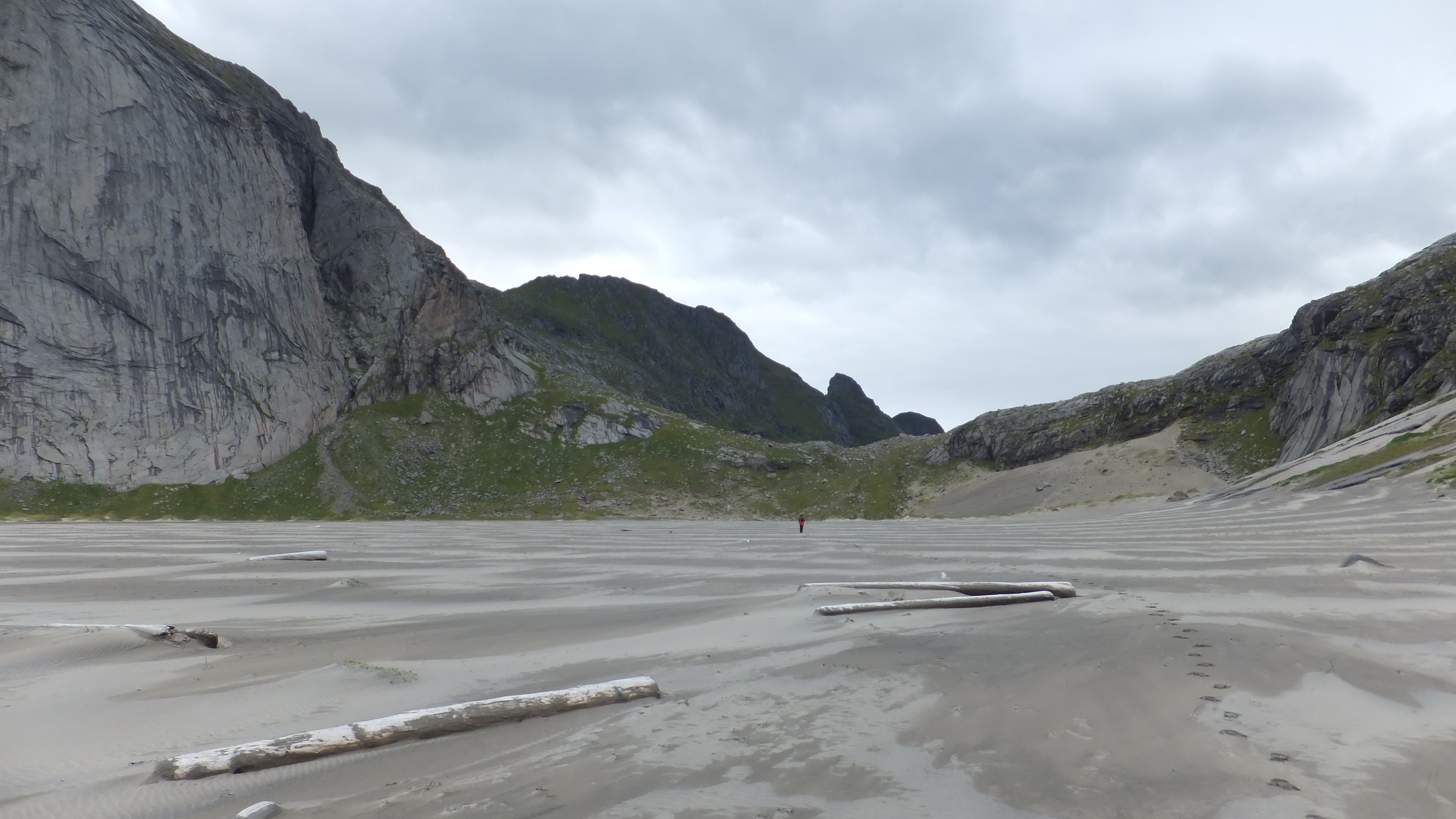
Bunesstrand sands on the west coast of Moskenes Island

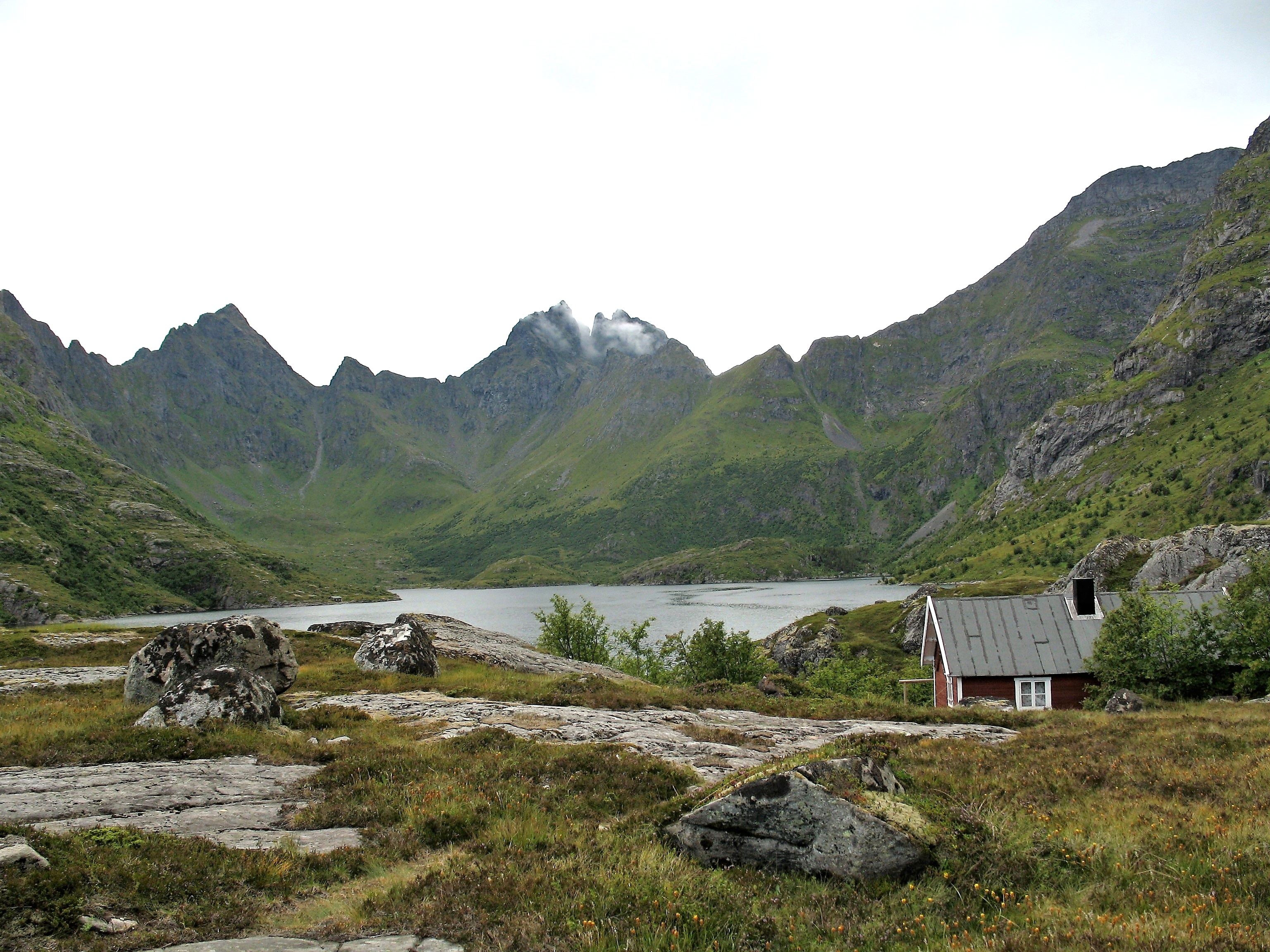
View of the western shore of Lake Ågvatnet with the peaks of Mannen and Gjerdtindal
