= Moskenesøya =

Island in Nordland, Norway

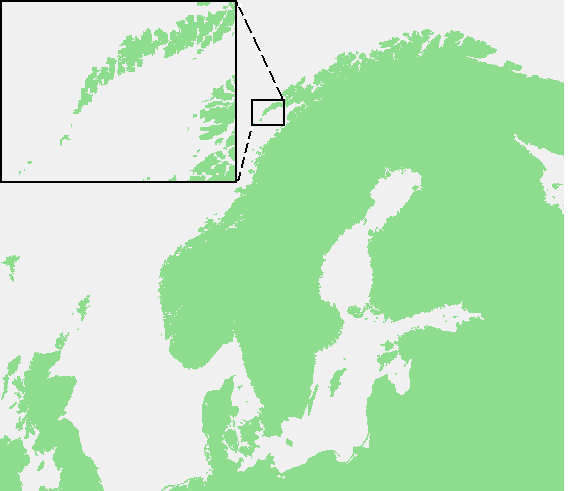
- Location in Norway
- Interactive map of Moskenesøya

Geography
- Location: Nordland, Norway
- Coordinates: 67°59′N 13°00′E
- Archipelago: Lofoten
- Area: 186 km^{2} (72 sq mi)
- Length: 40 km (25 mi)
- Width: 10 km (6 mi)
- Highest elevation: 1,029 m (3376 ft)
- Highest point: Hermannsdalstinden

Administration
- Norway
- County: Nordland
- Municipalities: Flakstad Municipality, Moskenes Municipality

Demographics
- Population: 1,263
- Pop. density: 6.8/km^{2} (17.6/sq mi)

Moskenesøya (lit. 'Moskenes Island') is an island at the southern end of the Lofoten archipelago in Nordland county, Norway. The 186-square-kilometre (72 sq mi) island is shared between Moskenes Municipality and Flakstad Municipality. The tidal whirlpool system known as Moskstraumen, one of the strongest in the world, is located between Moskenesøya's Lofoten Point and the island of Mosken.

== Geography ==
The island consists of an agglomeration of glaciated hills with the highest peak being the 1,029-metre-tall (3,376 ft) Hermannsdalstinden mountain. It is elongated from southwest to northeast and it is about 40 kilometres (25 mi) long and 10 km (6 mi) wide. It also has a very uneven shoreline. The island is connected to the nearby island of Flakstadøya by the Kåkern Bridge which is part of the European route E10 which ends on the Moskenesøya island at the village of Å.

== Population ==
There are many villages on the island. Flakstad Municipality, on the northern part of the island, has several small villages including Fredvang, Selfjord, and Krystad. Moskenes Municipality, on the southern part of the island, has the villages of Å, Hamnøya, Moskenes, Reine, Sakrisøy, Sørvågen, and Tind, all located on the eastern side of the island. There were settlements on the western coast, but the last ones were abandoned in 1950s owing to severe storms.

== Attractions ==
Most villages are frequently visited by tourists and have designed small exhibits of local peculiarities. So Sakrisøy has a museum of 2,500 dolls from all over Europe. Sørvågen contains a local department of Norsk Telemuseum (Norwegian Telecom Museum) which reflects the local history of telegraphy. In 1861, the island became part of the 170-kilometre-long (110 mi) Lofoten telegraph line with a station in Sørvågen (which became the Sørvågen museum in 1914), and in 1867 the line was connected with Europe. In 1906, a wireless telegraph system was installed in Sørvågen – the second in Europe after Italy – connecting Sørvågen with Røst island.

The village of Å is a traditional fishing place and nearly its entire territory is the 150 years old Norwegian Fishing Village Museum, which includes the Lofoten Stockfish Museum, a forge, a bakery, and a cod liver oil factory.

== History ==
In the beginning of World War II, the island was occupied by the German Army. In December 1941, it was the venue of the Operation Anklet – a British Commando raid carried out by 300 men from No. 12 Commando and the Norwegian Independent Company 1. The landing party was supported by 22 ships from three navies – British, Norwegian and Polish. As a result, two German radio transmitters were destroyed and several small boats were captured or sunk. Importantly an operational Enigma coding machine was obtained from one of the sunken German patrol ships. Also, about 200 local Norwegians volunteered to serve in the Free Norwegian Forces.

== Media gallery ==
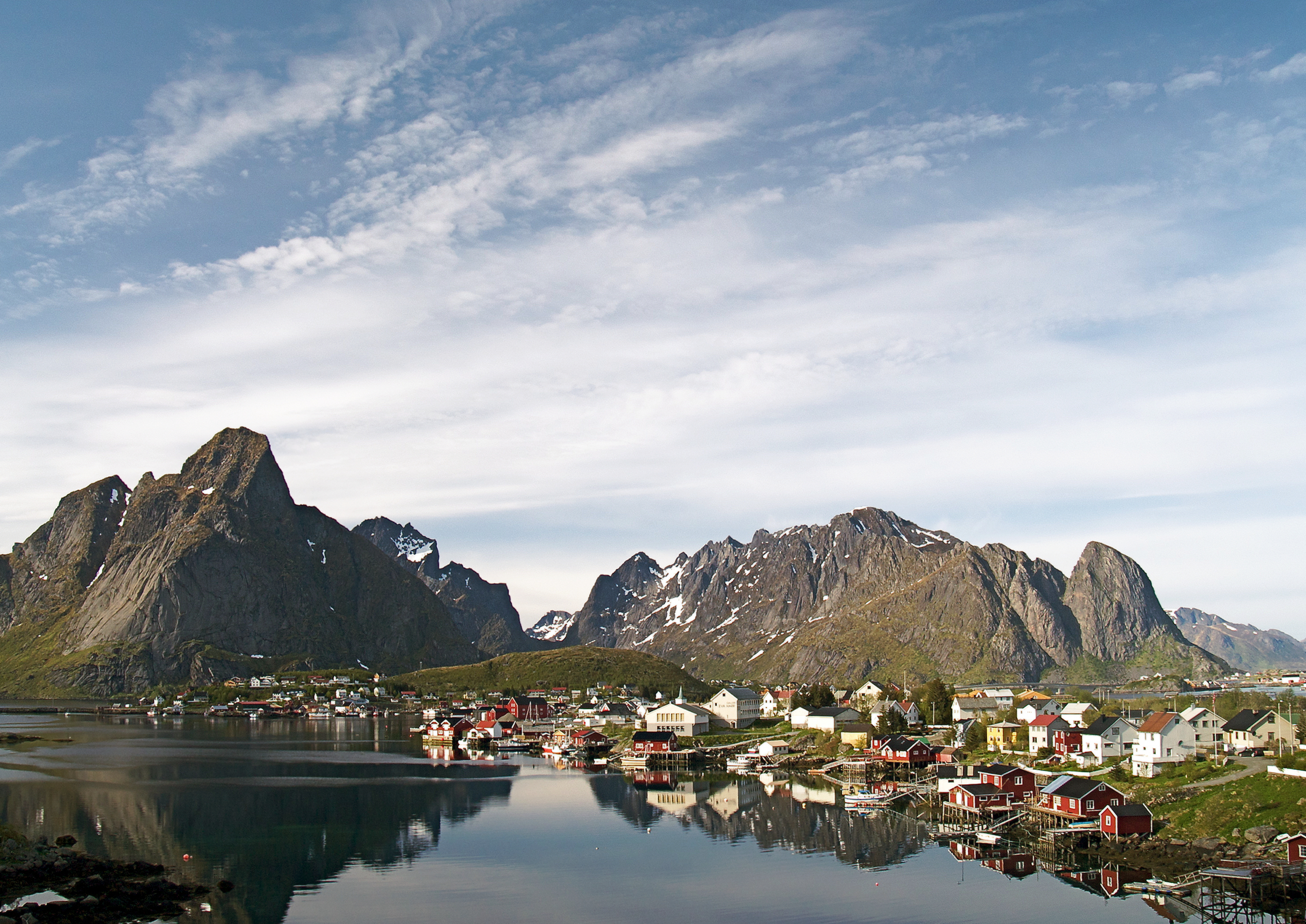
Reine

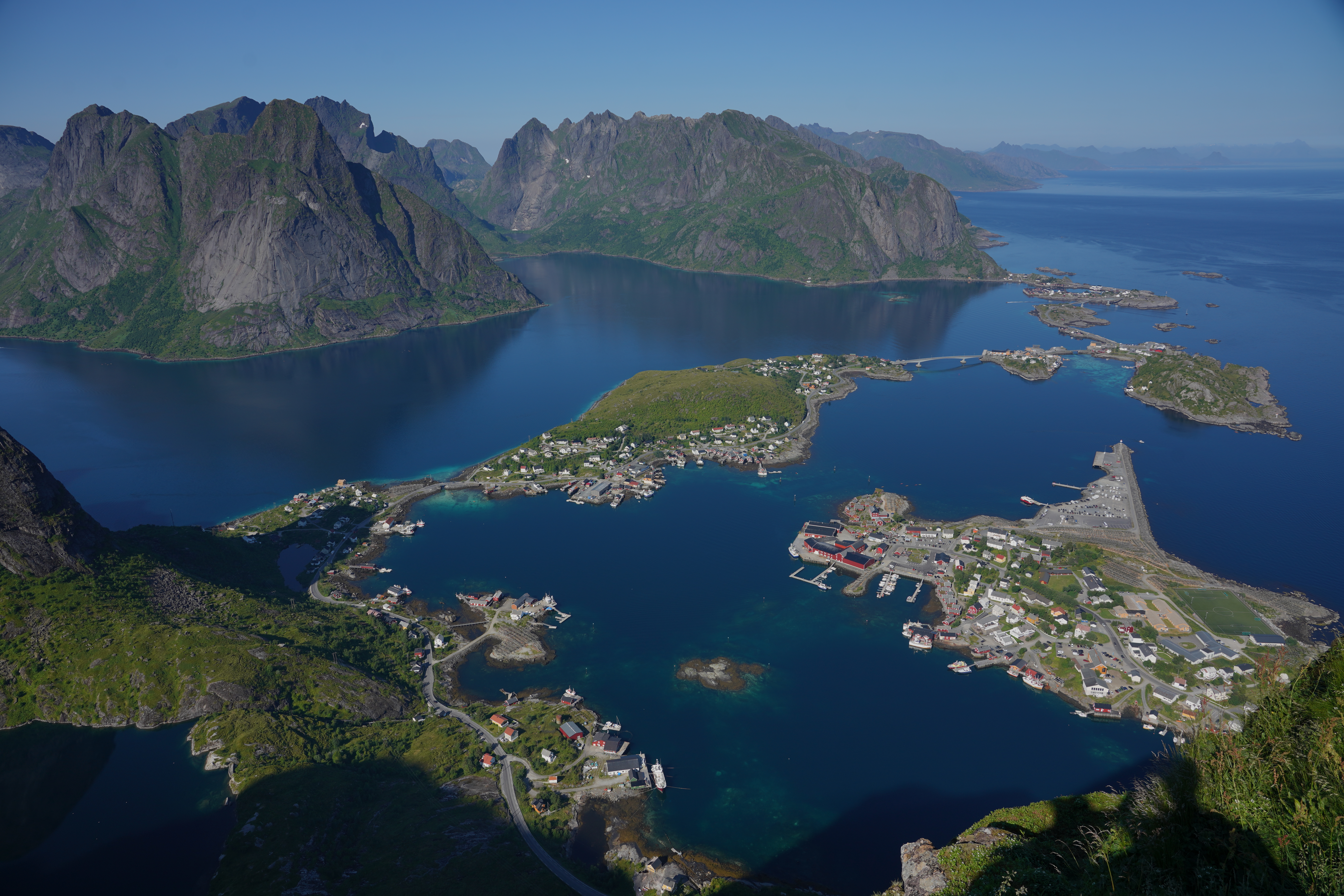
Reine

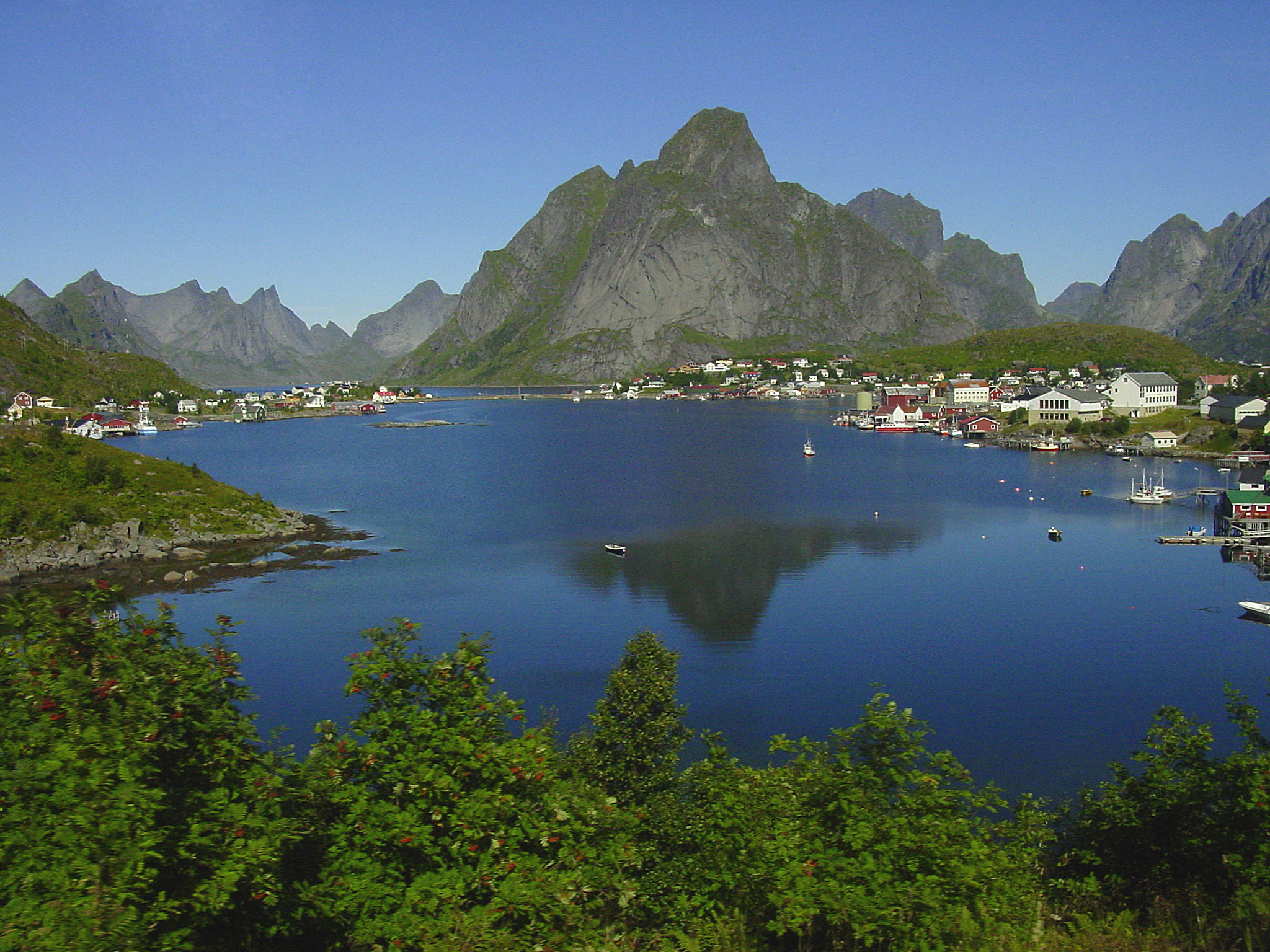
Reine

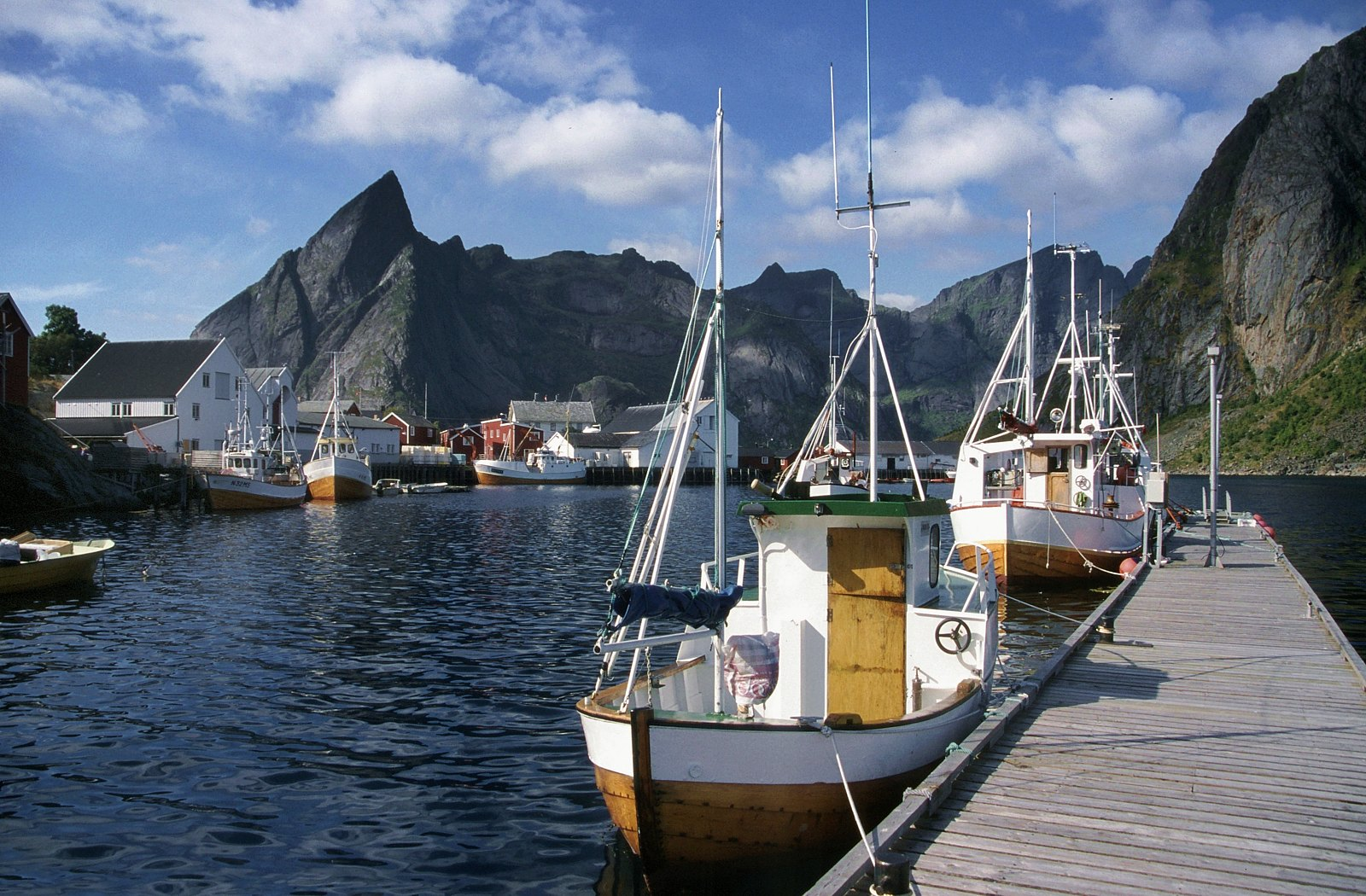
Hamnøy

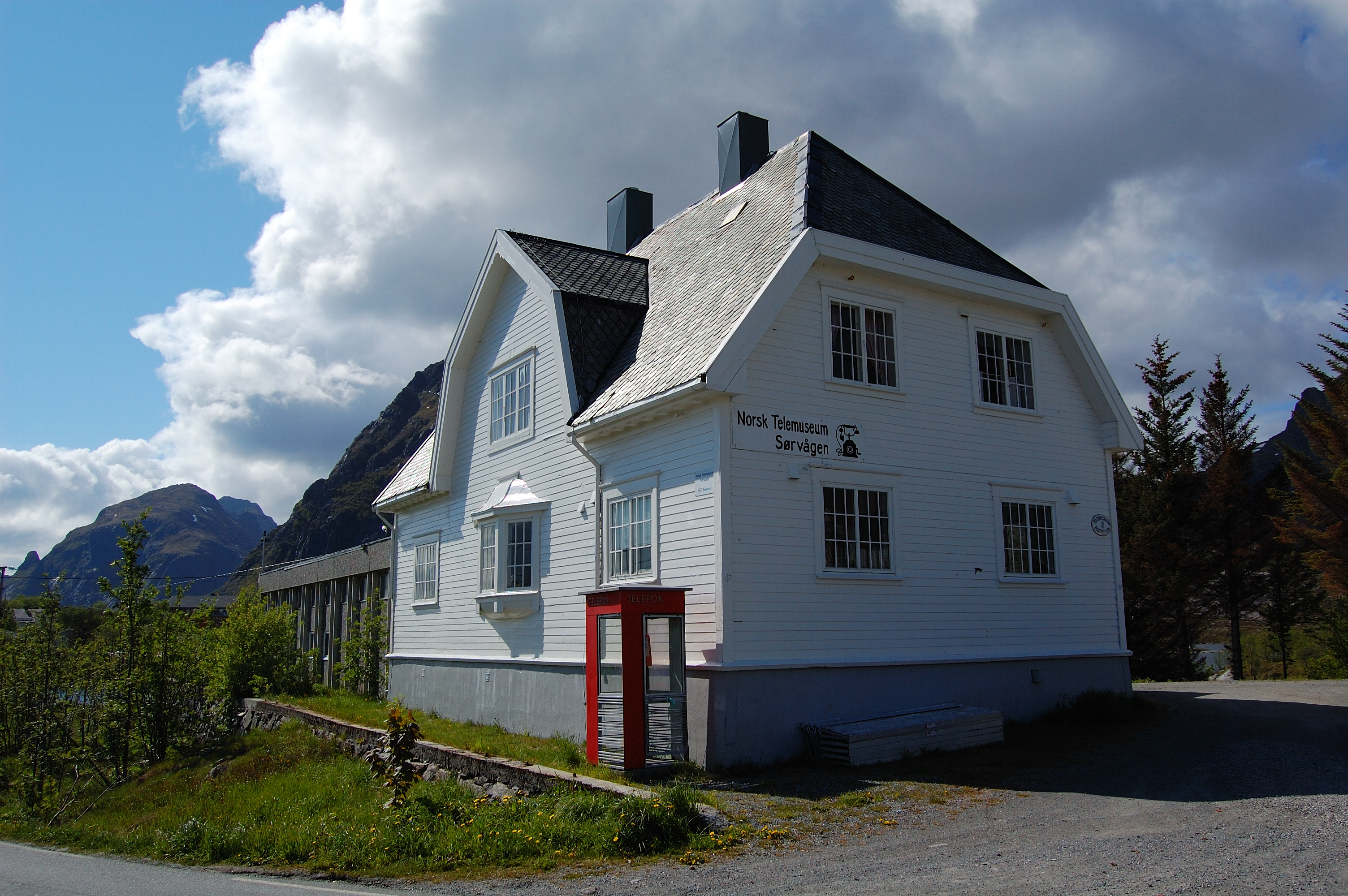
Norwegian Telecom Museum in Sørvågen

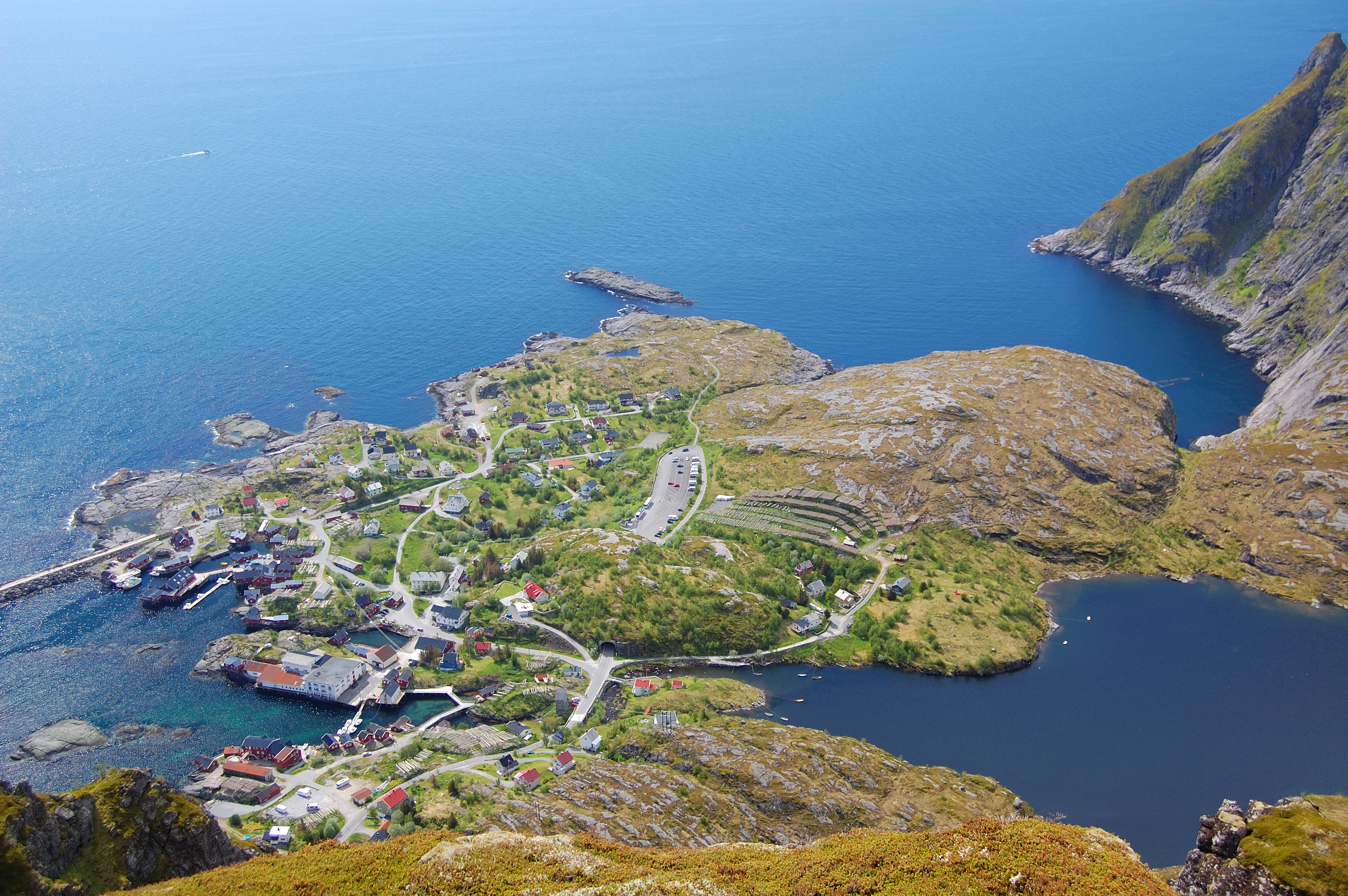
Village of Å

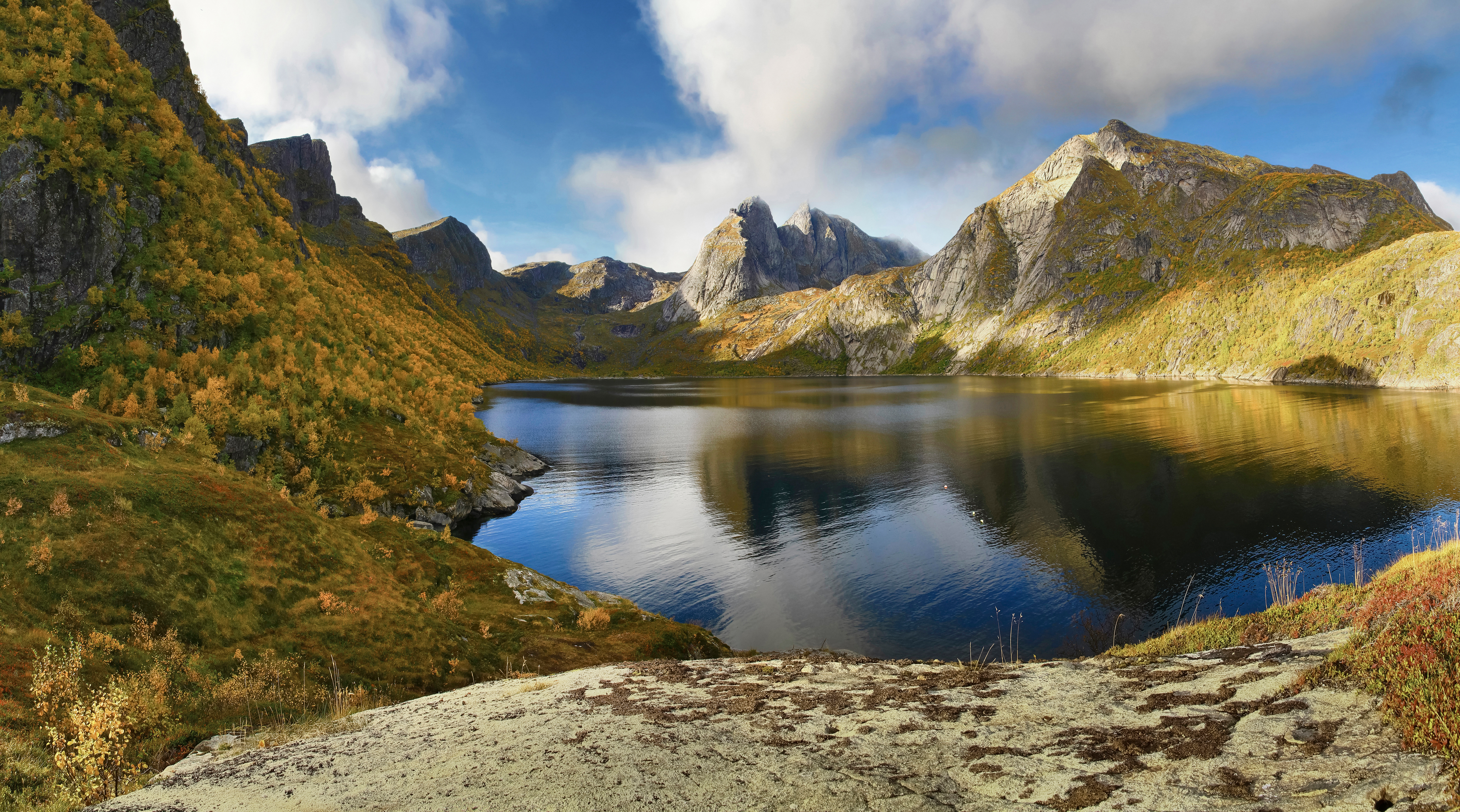
Djupfjorden, toward the northwest, in autumn

== See also ==
- List of islands of Norway by area
- List of islands of Norway
