= Helvetestinden =

Mountain in Nordland, Norway

- Interactive map of the mountain

Highest point
- Elevation: 602 m (1,975 ft)
- Coordinates: 67°58′52.18″N 12°58′53.44″E

Geography
- Location: Lofoten, Norway

Climbing
- Easiest route: South side ridge

Helvetestinden (lit. 'Hell Peak') is a granite mountain peak located near Bunes beach in Moskenes Municipality in Lofoten, Norway. It is located within the Lofotodden National Park. It is known for the 602-metre (1,975 ft) high climbing route on the west facing vertical cliff.

Most hikers summit it through the south side ridge which requires scrambling along a narrow ridge at the top. Once at the peak, hikers can view the Norwegian sea to the west, the isolated white sandy beach of Bunestranda below, and Kierkefjorden to the south.
