= Fredvang Bridges =

Fredvang Bridges Fredvangbruene
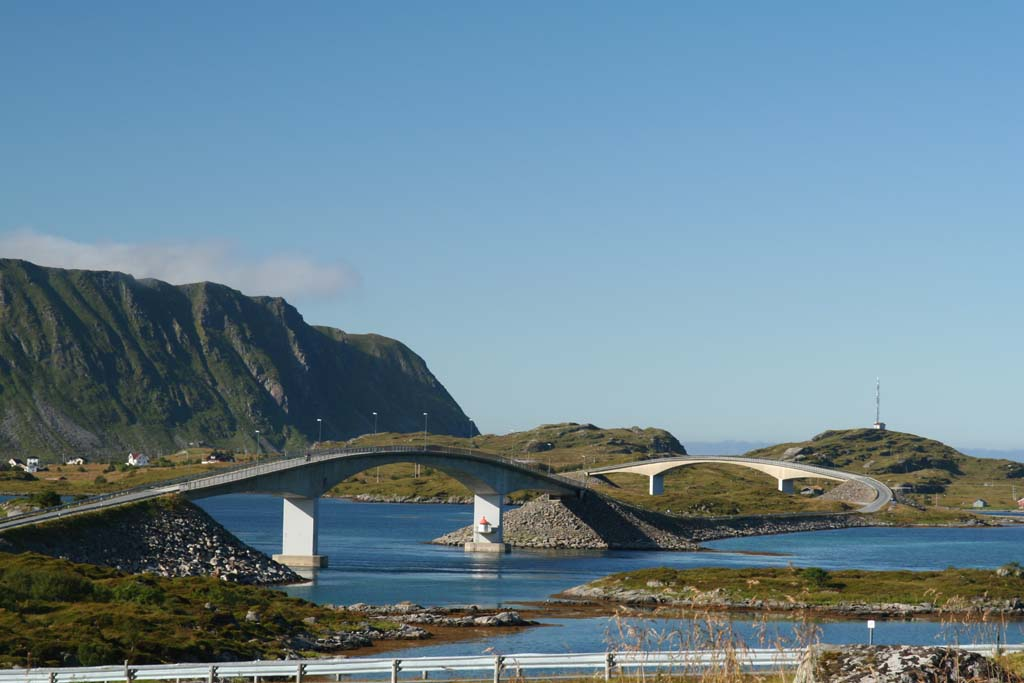
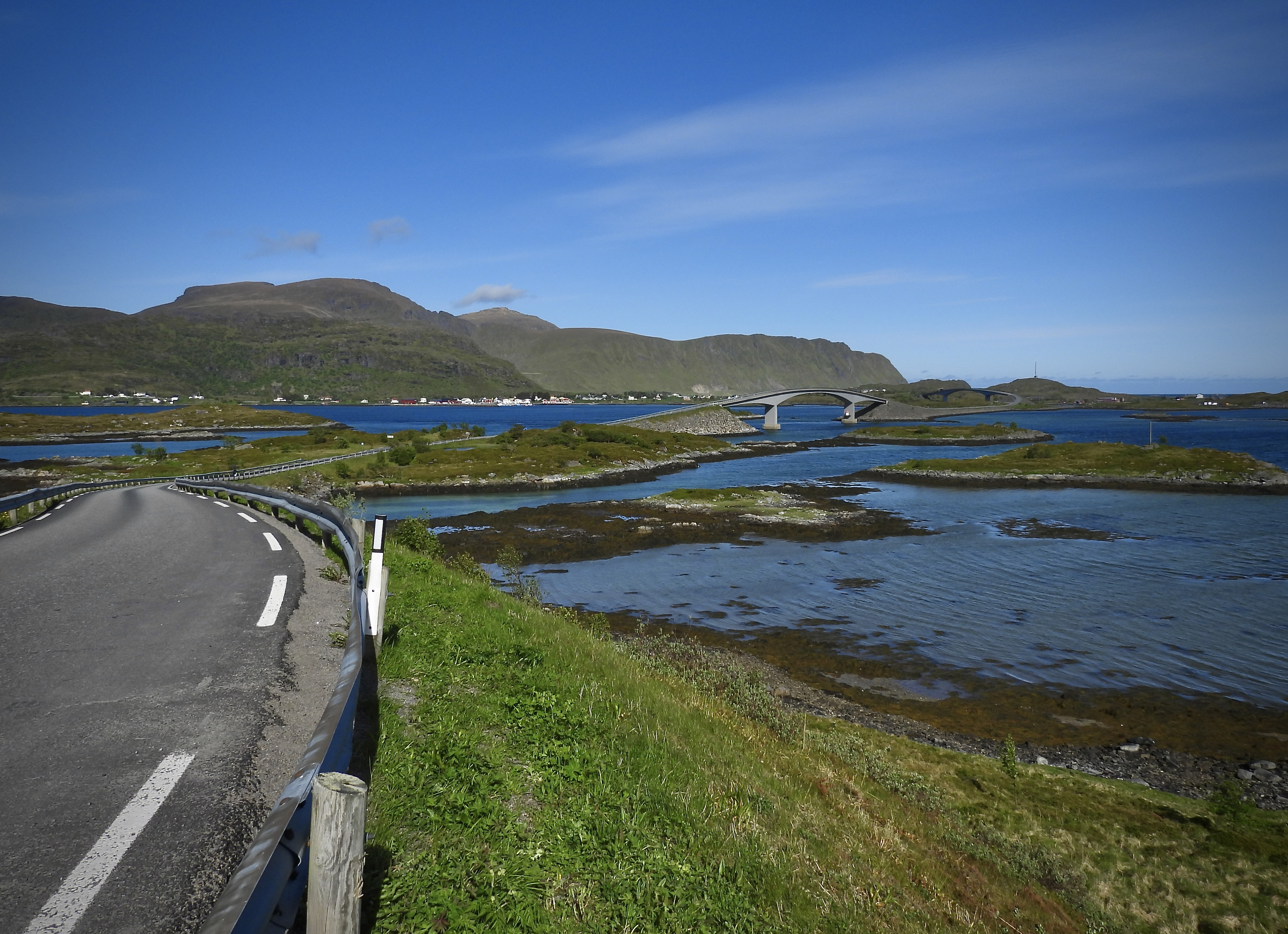
- View of the bridges The Fredvang Bridges (Left: Kubholmleia Bridge, Right: Røssøystraumen Bridge)
- Coordinates: 68.0803°N 13.2003°E
- Carries: Fv986
- Crosses: Røssøystraumen
- Locale: Flakstad, Norway

Location
- Interactive map of Fredvang Bridges

The Fredvang Bridges (Norwegian: Fredvangbruene) are two cantilever bridges that connect the fishing village of Fredvang on the island of Moskenesøya with the neighbouring island of Flakstadøya — in Flakstad Municipality, Nordland county, Norway.

The south bridge is called Kubholmleia Bridge (Norwegian: Kubholmleia bru) and the north bridge is Røssøystraumen Bridge (Norwegian: Røssøystraumen bru). The two bridges are each 240 metres (790 ft) long, with a cantilevered centre span of 115 metres (377 ft).

The bridges, which opened in 1988, are among many bridges that interconnect the islands of the Lofoten archipelago. The only other bridge connecting these two islands is the Kåkern Bridge.

== See also ==
- List of bridges in Norway
- List of bridges in Norway by length
- List of bridges
- List of bridges by length

== Photos ==
- Picture 1
- Picture 2
- Picture 3
