= Kåkern Bridge =

Kåkern Bridge Kåkernbrua
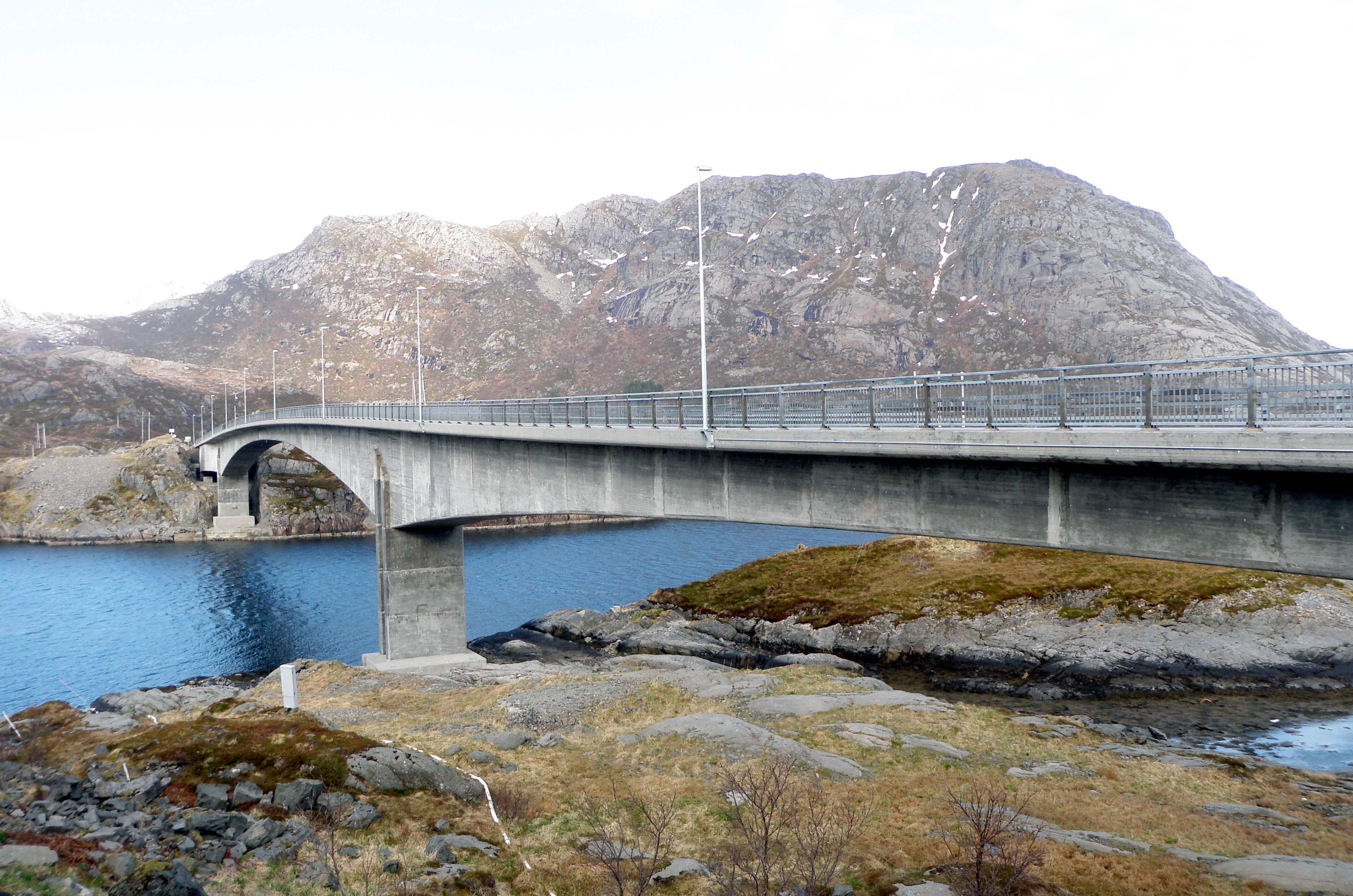
- View of the bridge
- Coordinates: 68.0189°N 13.1815°E
- Carries: E10
- Crosses: Kåkernsundet
- Locale: Flakstad, Norway

Characteristics
- Design: Cantilever bridge
- Material: Prestressed concrete
- Total length: 303 metres (994 ft)
- Width: 10 metres (33 ft)

The Kåkern Bridge (Norwegian: Kåkernbrua) is a cantilever road bridge that crosses the Kåkernsundet strait between the islands of Flakstadøya and Moskenesøya in Flakstad Municipality in Nordland county, Norway. The 303-metre (994 ft) long Kåkern Bridge was opened in 2002. The Kåkern Bridge is one of the many bridges that connect the islands of the Lofoten archipelago to each other. The Fredvang Bridges are the only other bridge connection between the islands of Flakstadøya and Moskenesøya.

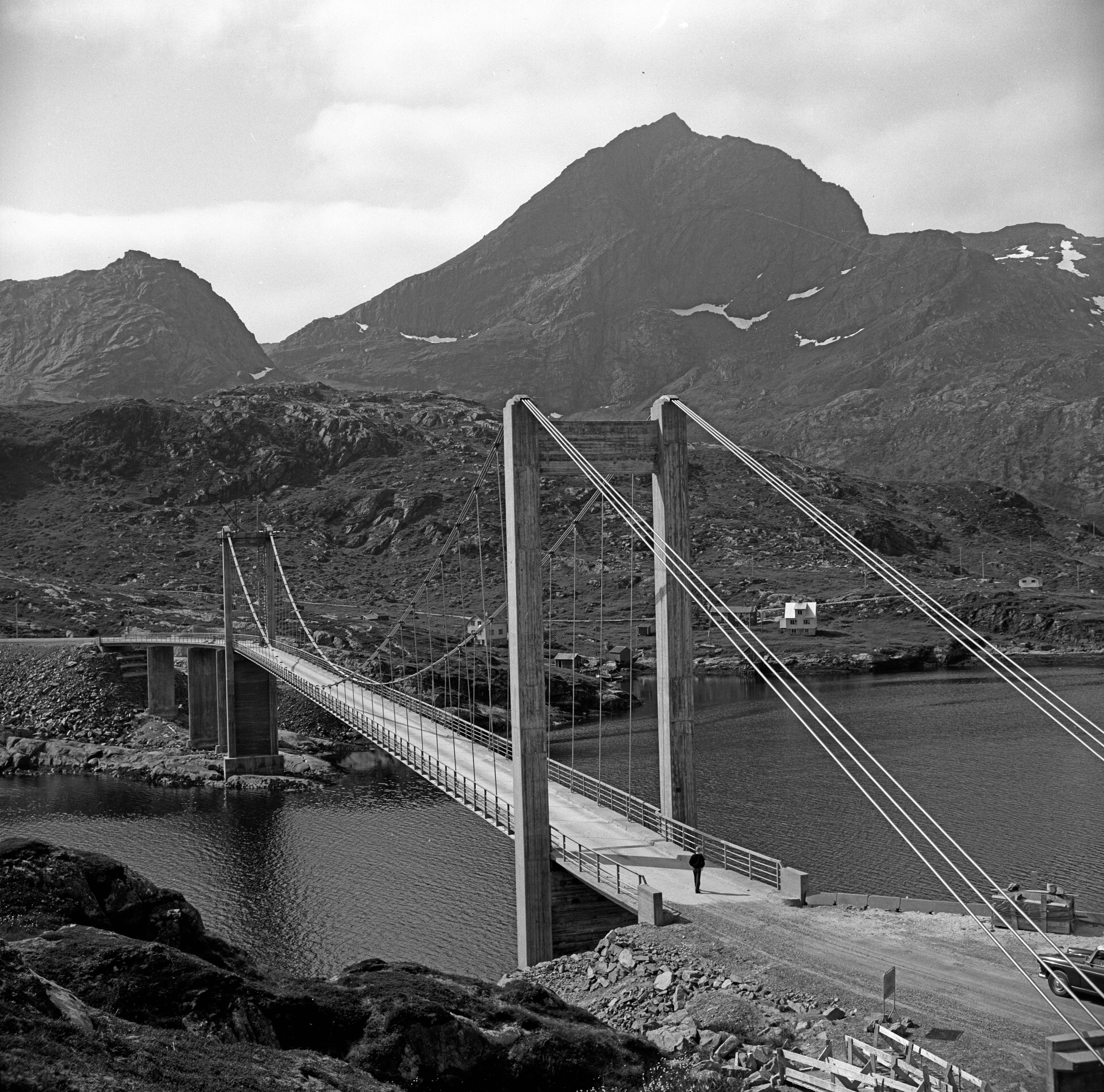
Old Kåkern Bridge (approx 1961)

== History ==
The present Kåkern Bridge replaced an older suspension bridge. The old Kåkern Bridge was 228 metres (748 ft) long and it was in use from 1961 until 2002 when the new bridge was completed just to the south of the old bridge.

== See also ==
- List of bridges in Norway
- List of bridges in Norway by length
- List of bridges
- List of bridges by length
