= Fredvang =

Village in Flakstad Municipality, Norway

- Village
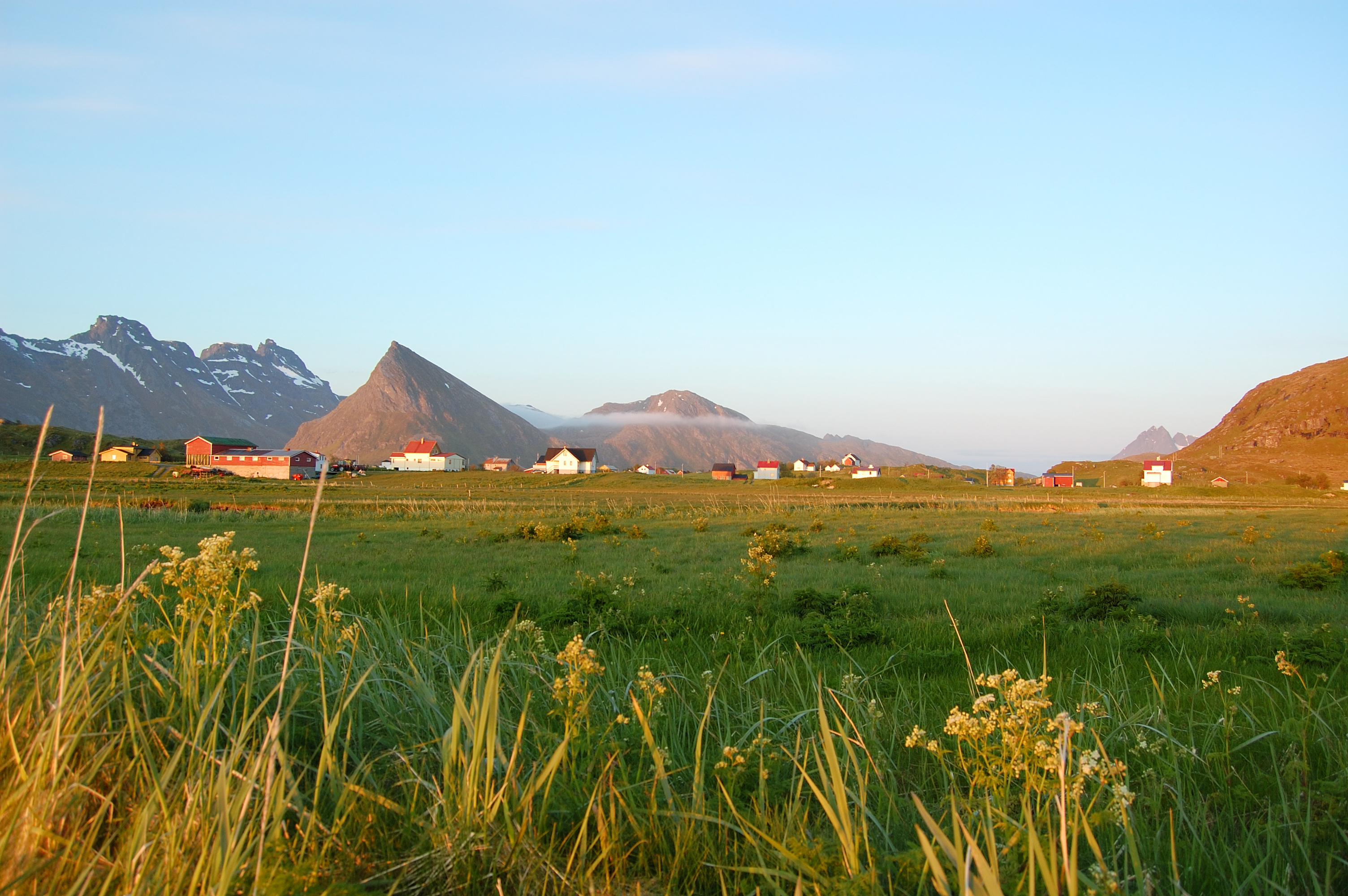
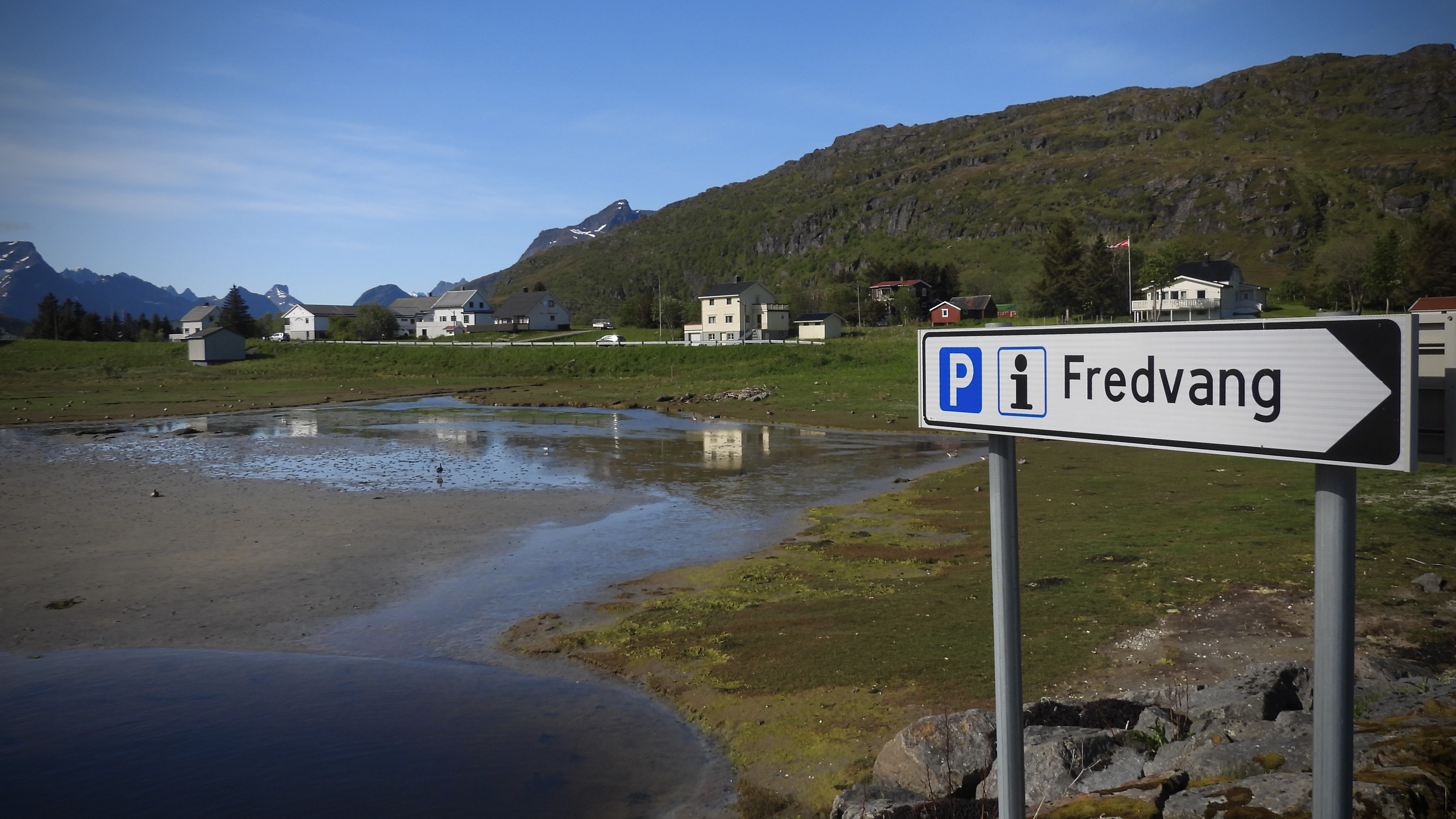
- View of the village FREDVANG metal roadside placard.
- Interactive map of Fredvang
- Location within Nordland Location within Norway
- Coordinates: 68.0841°N 13.1667°E
- Country: Norway
- Region: Northern Norway
- County: Nordland
- District: Lofoten
- Municipality: Flakstad Municipality
- Elevation: 8 m (26 ft)
- Time zone: UTC+01:00 (CET)
  - Summer (DST): UTC+02:00 (CEST)
- Post Code: 8387 Fredvang

Fredvang is a village in Flakstad Municipality in Nordland County, Norway. The village is located on the island of Moskenesøya in the Lofoten archipelago. The village is fairly isolated, with the Fredvang Bridges being the only road connection to the village from the rest of Norway.
