= Norwegian Fishing Village Museum =

Fishing museum in Å, Norway

Coordinates: 67.8799°N 12.9829°E

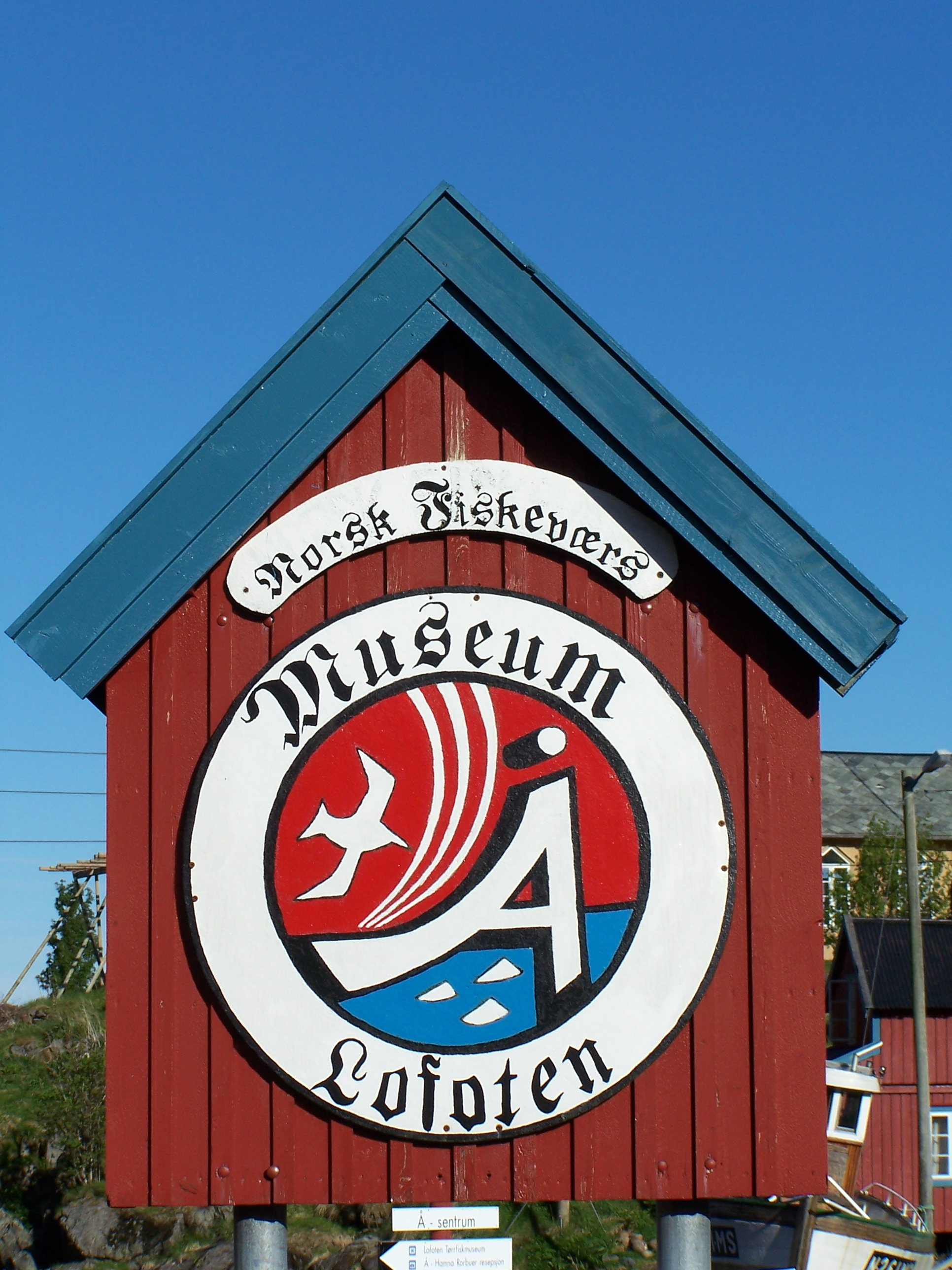
Norwegian Fisheries Museum at Å in Moskenes Municipality

The Norwegian Fishing Village Museum (Norsk Fiskeværsmuseum) is a museum devoted to Norwegian fishing in the village of Å in Moskenes Municipality in Lofoten in northern Norway.

== Overview ==
The museum was founded on July 3, 1987, by the Moskenes History and Museum Society in collaboration with the Moskenes municipal council and Sigurd Harald Ellingsen. It was officially opened in June 1988 and has been receiving public grants since 1990. Exhibits focus on life around the Lofoten Fishery from approx. 1840 to 1960.

== Gallery ==
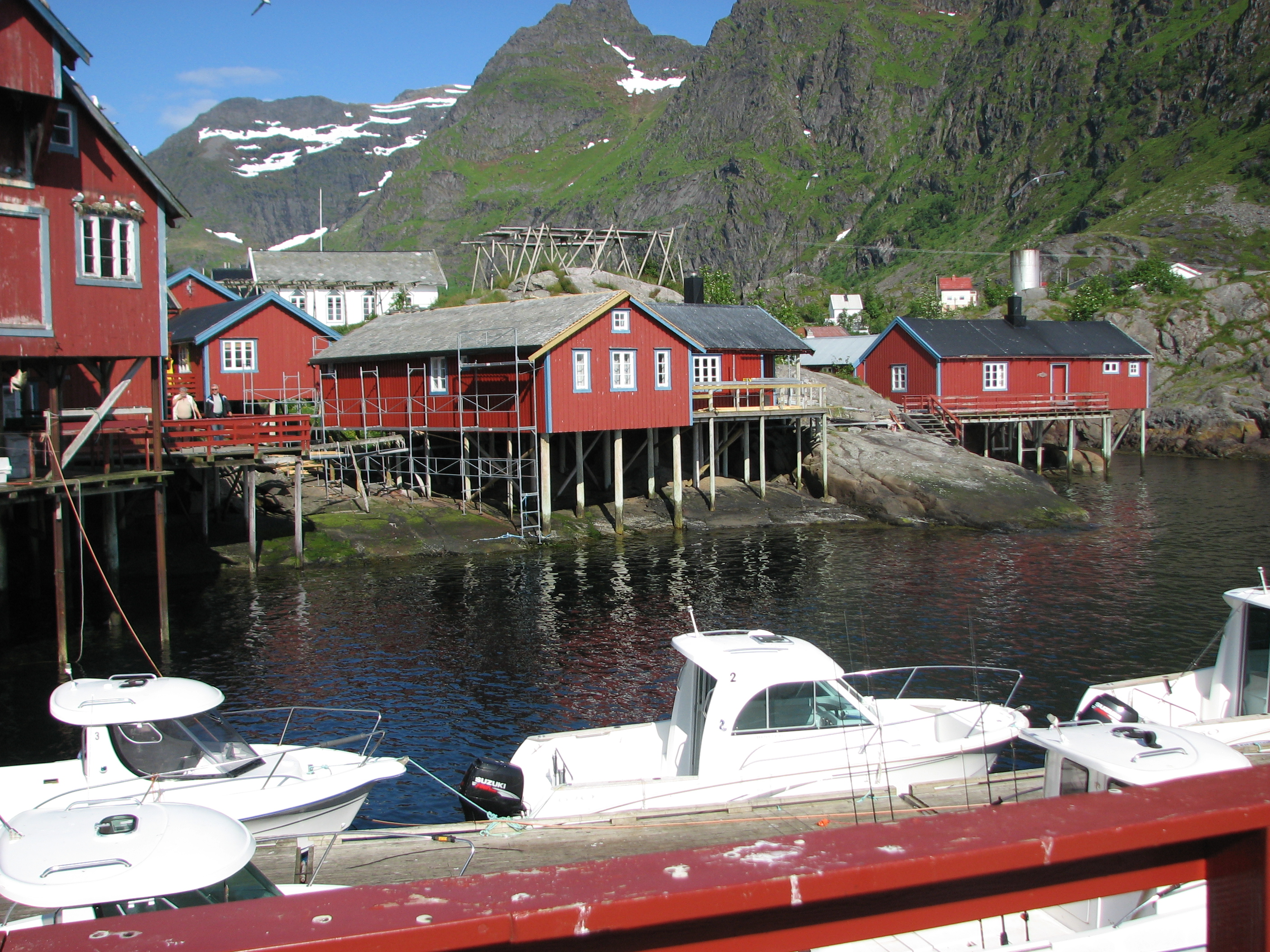
View of several buildings

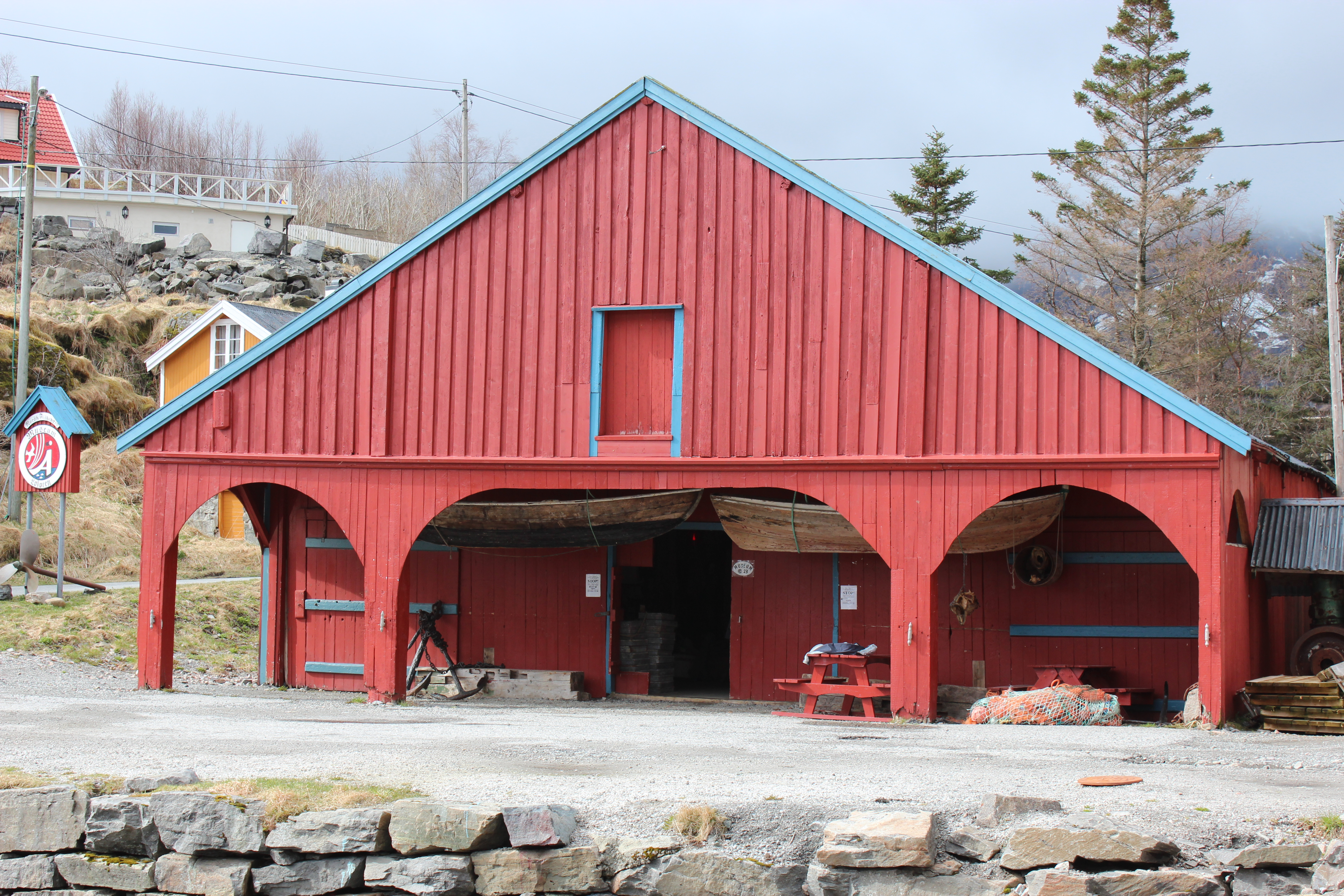
Boathouse

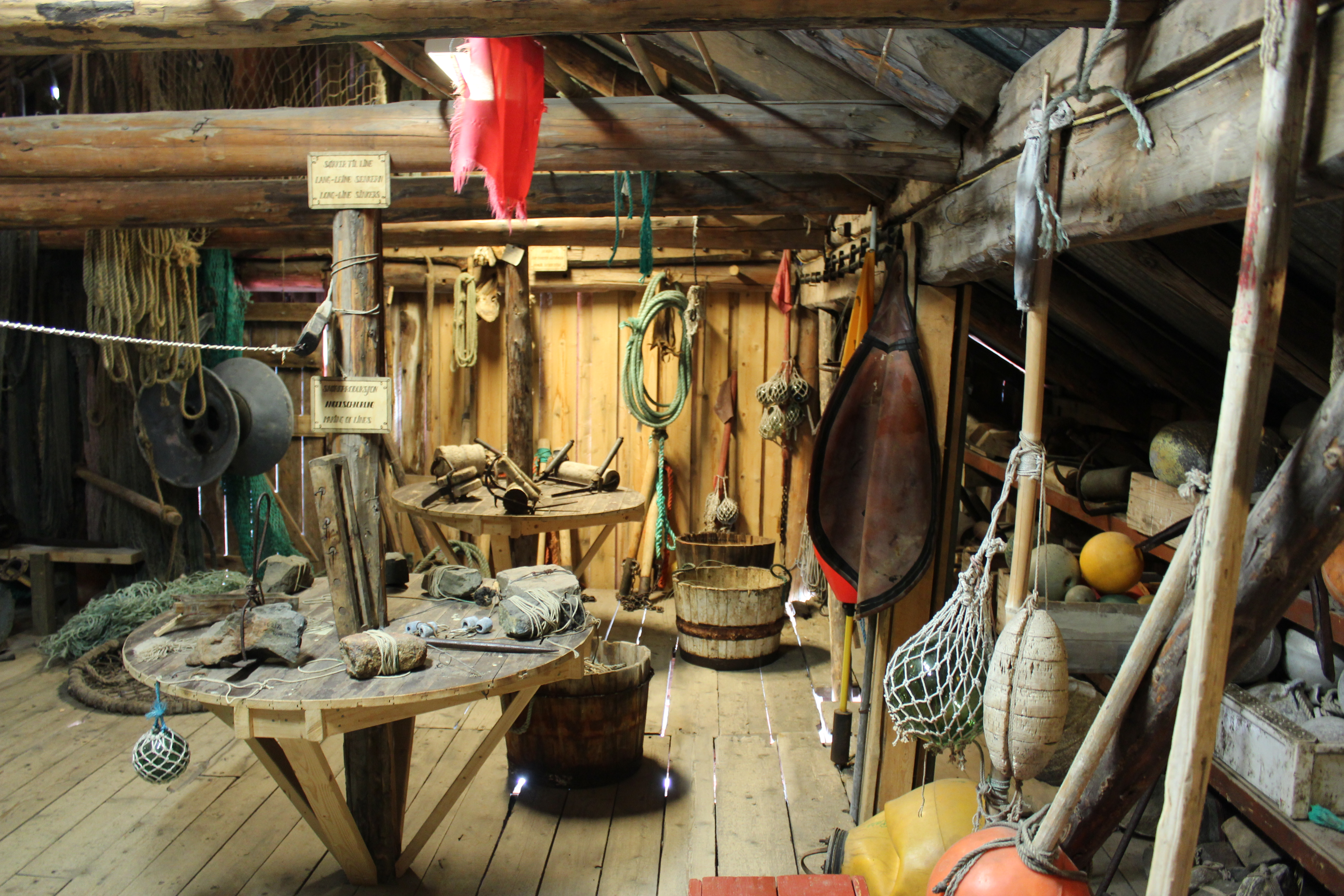
Fishing Village display

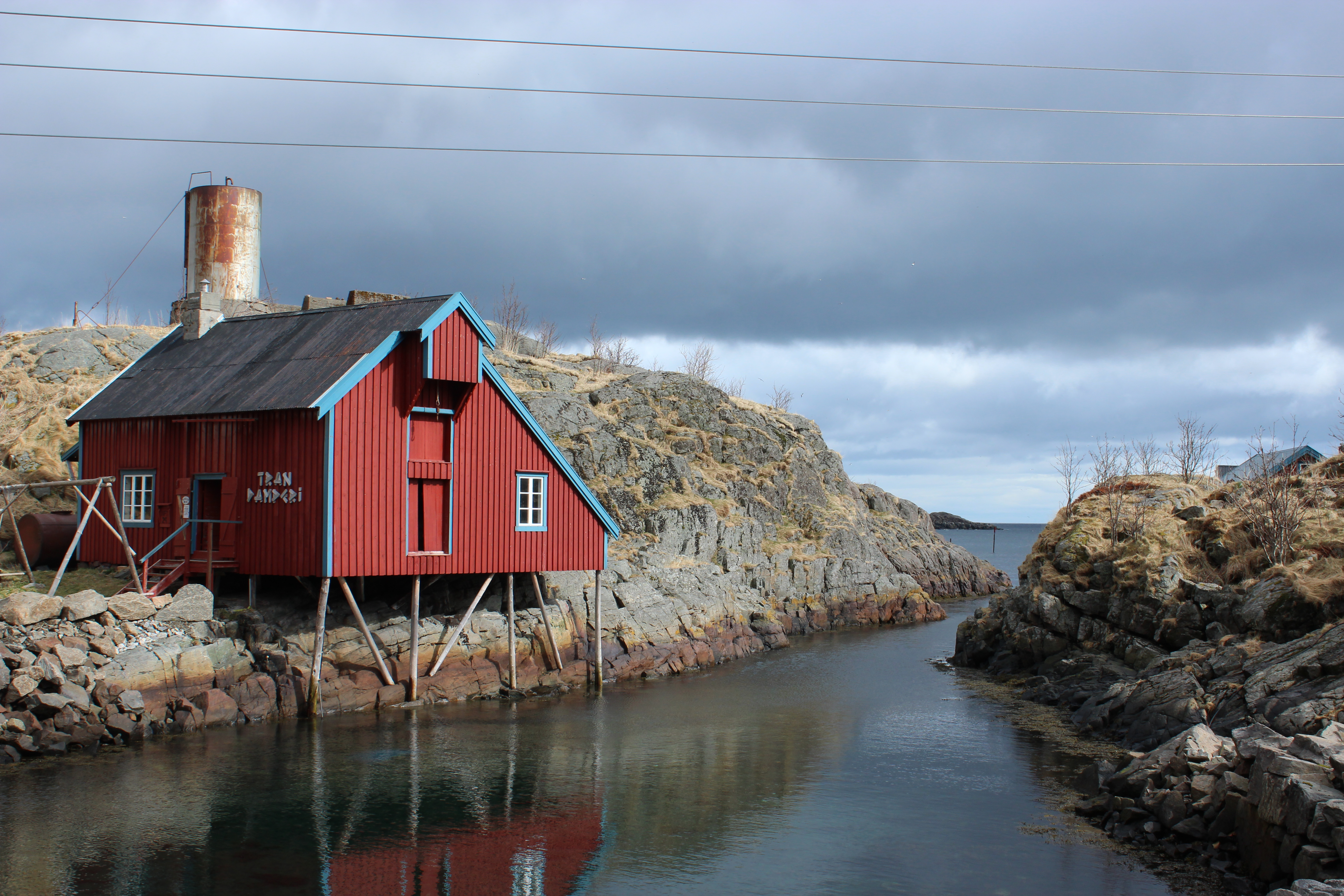
Cod Liver Oil facility

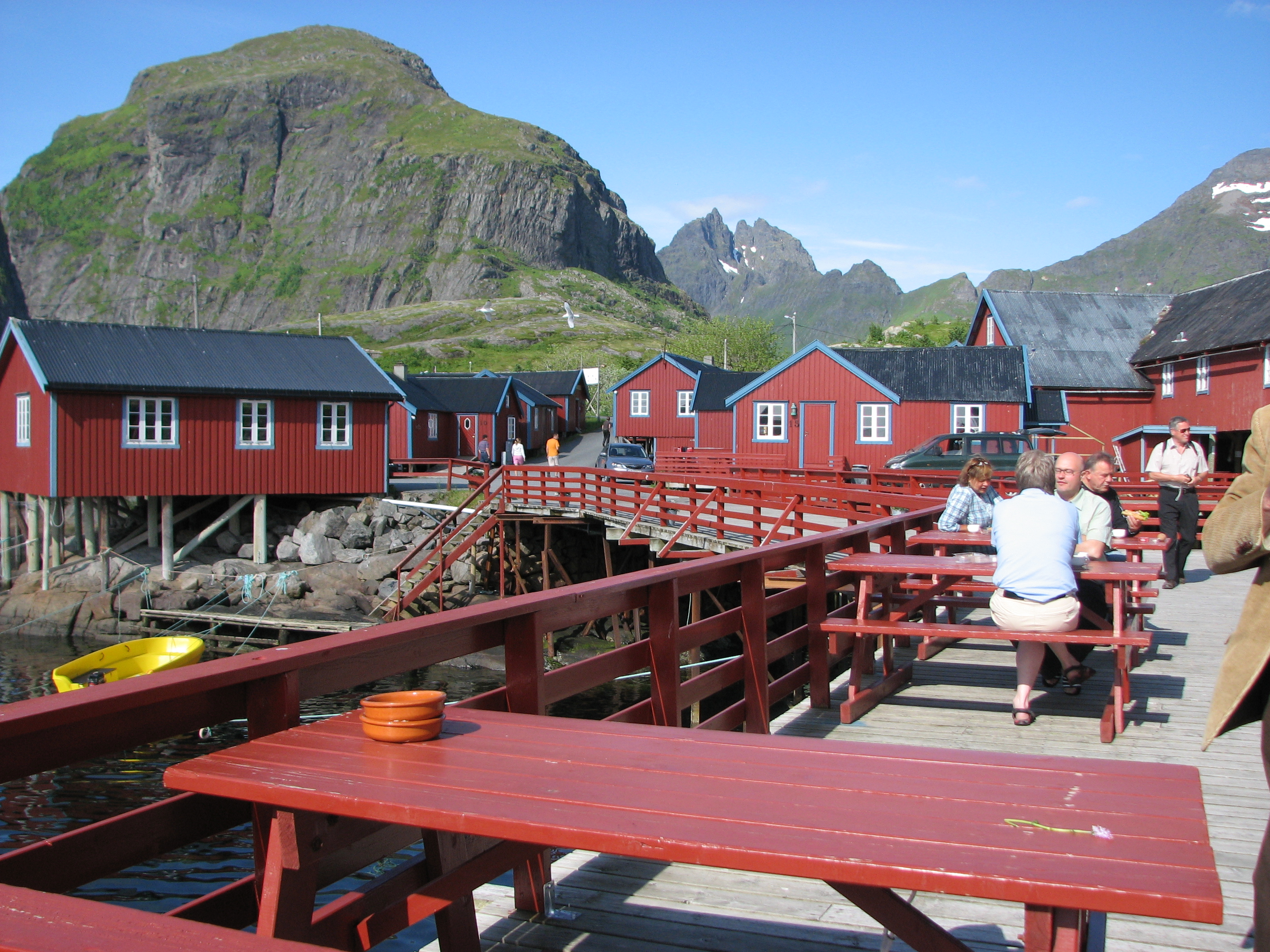
Tourist facilities

== See also ==
- Lofoten Stockfish Museum
