= Hermannsdalstinden =

Mountain in Lofoten, Nordland, Norway

- Hermansdalstinden
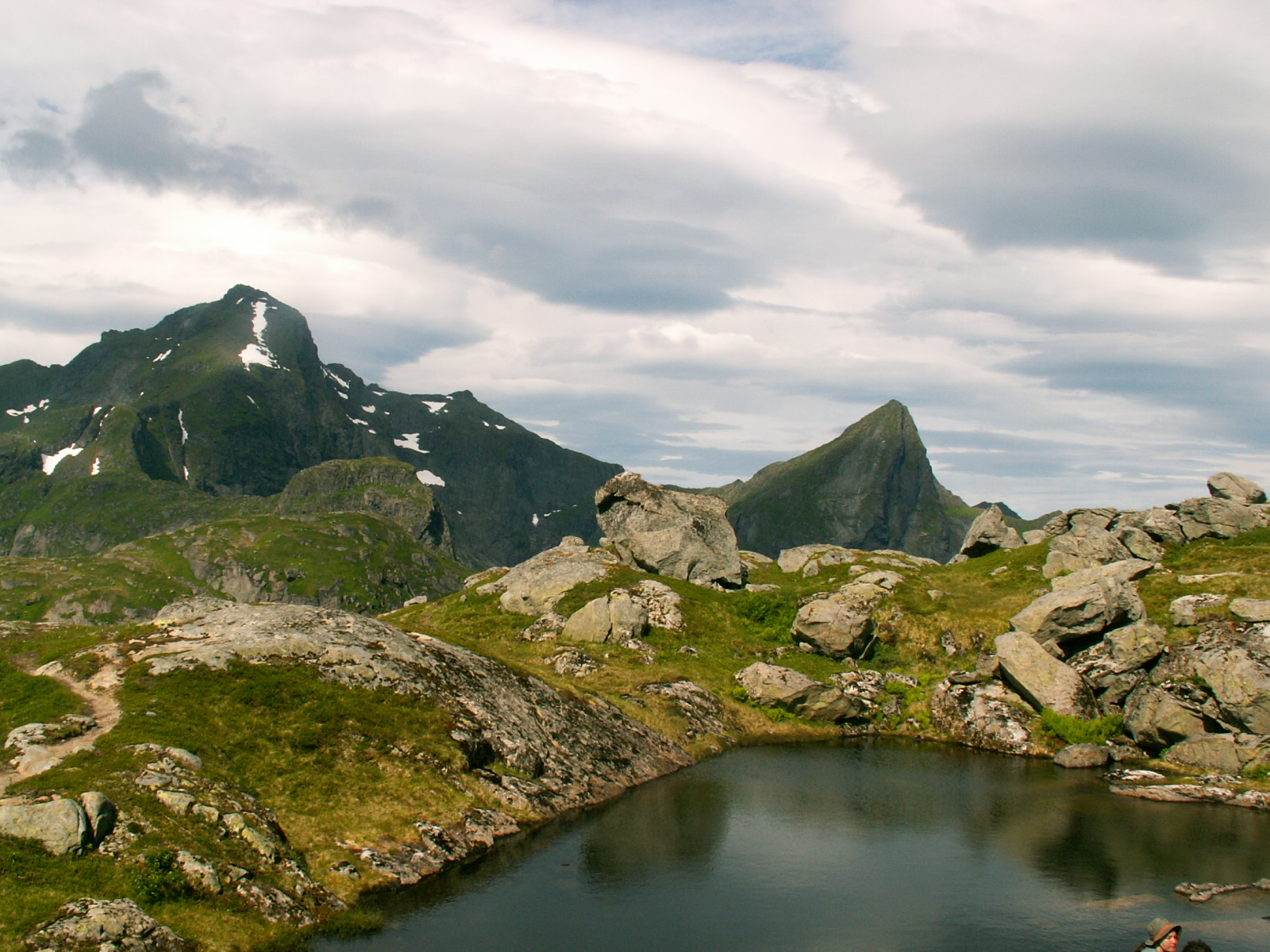

Highest point
- Elevation: 1,029 m (3,376 ft)
- Prominence: 1,029 m (3,376 ft)
- Isolation: 86.4 to 86.6 km (53.7 to 53.8 mi)
- Coordinates: 67.9420°N 12.9380°E

Geography
- Interactive map of the mountain
- Location: Nordland, Norway
- Topo map: 1830 I Lofotodden

Hermannsdalstinden is the highest mountain on the island of Moskenesøya. It is located in the Lofoten archipelago in Moskenes Municipality in Nordland county, Norway. The 1,029-metre (3,376 ft) tall mountain lies on the west side of the island, about 6.5 kilometres (4.0 mi) west of the municipal centre of Reine. There's a cabin, Munkebu Hut, that is used as an overnight base camp for summiting Hermannsdalstinden. The hike from Munkebu Hut to the Hermannsdalstinden summit takes about six to eight hours round trip.
