= Lofoten Stockfish Museum =

Museum in the Lofoten Islands, Norway

Coordinates: 67°53′N 12°59′E

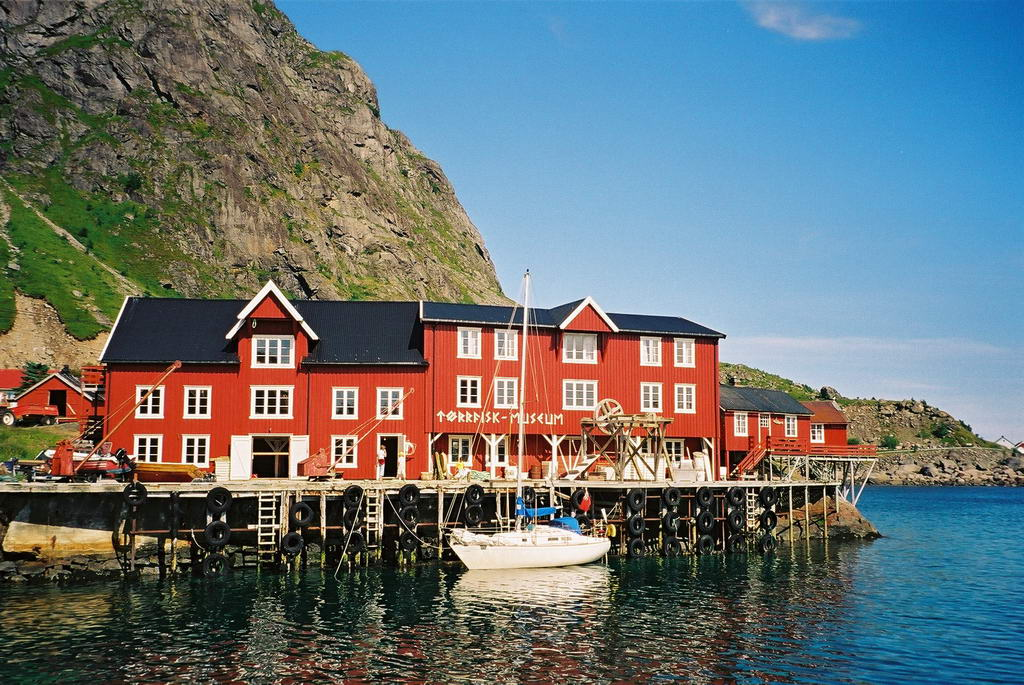
Lofoten Tørrfiskmuseum

Lofoten Stockfish Museum (Norwegian: Lofoten Tørrfiskmuseum) is located in the village of Å in Moskenes Municipality which is located in the Lofoten islands of Nordland county, Norway.

The Lofoten Stockfish Museum is devoted to the production of Norwegian stockfish, one of Norway's oldest export commodities. The Museum is located in an old fish landing station. The museum displays the process from when the fish is brought ashore until it is finally packaged and ready for export. There are two museums located at Å in Lofoten, the other being the Norwegian Fishing Village Museum (Norsk Fiskeværsmuseum).
