= Å, Moskenes =

Village in Moskenes Municipality, Norway

Å Å i Lofoten
- Village
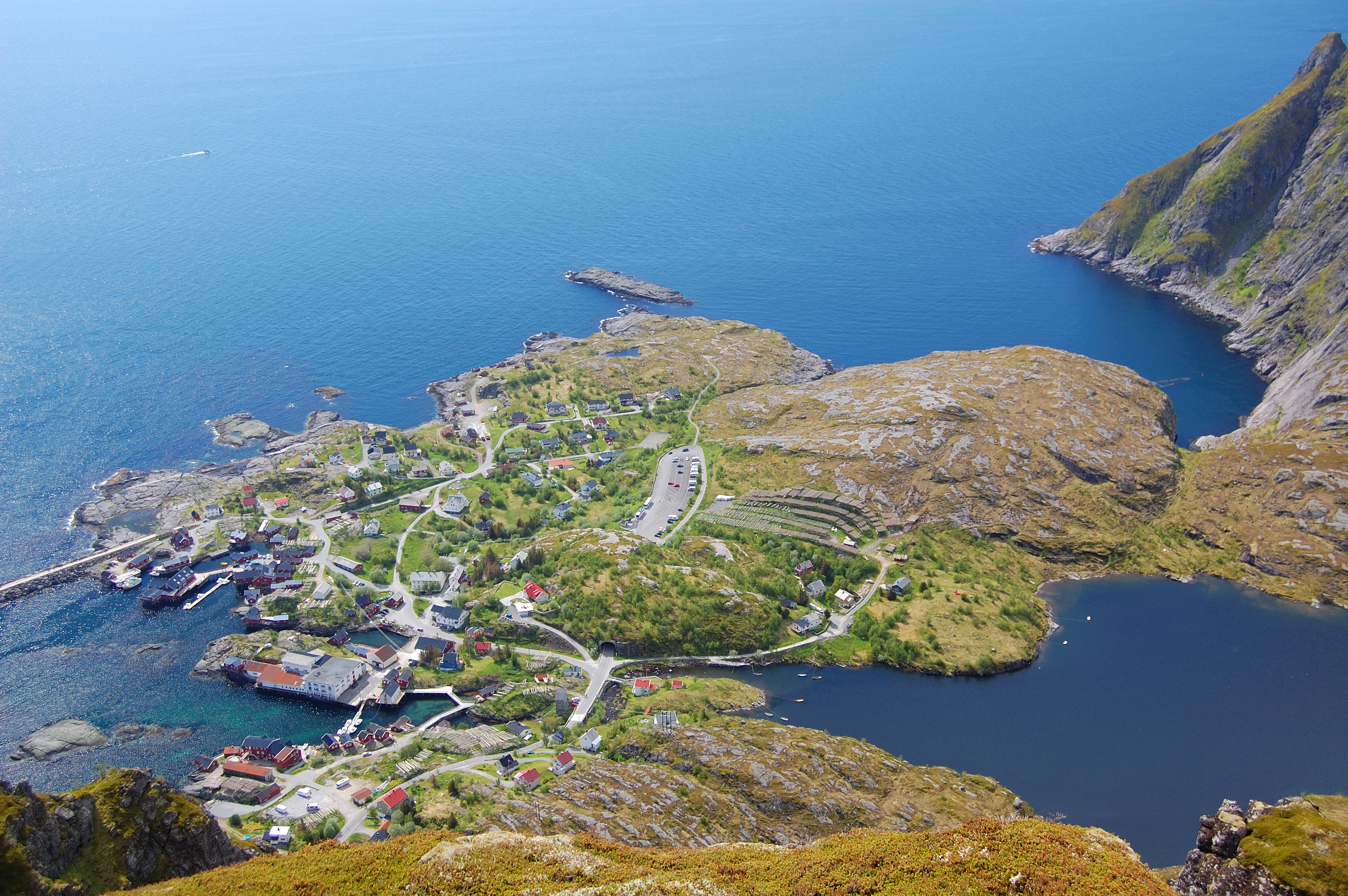
- View of the village of Å
- Interactive map of Å
- Location within Nordland Location within Norway
- Coordinates: 67.8796°N 12.9840°E
- Country: Norway
- Region: Northern Norway
- County: Nordland
- District: Lofoten
- Municipality: Moskenes Municipality

Area
  - Total: 7.8 km^{2} (3 sq mi)
- Elevation: 6 m (20 ft)
- Time zone: UTC+01:00 (CET)
  - Summer (DST): UTC+02:00 (CEST)
- Post Code: 8392 Sørvågen
- Climate classification: Cfc

Å (Norwegian pronunciation: [oː], from å meaning "stream"), or Å i Lofoten (lit. 'Å in Lofoten') is a village in Moskenes Municipality in Nordland county, Norway. It is located about 2 kilometres (1.2 mi) southwest of the village of Sørvågen on the island of Moskenesøya, towards the southern end of the Lofoten archipelago. It is connected to the rest of the archipelago by the European route E10 highway, which ends here. This part of the highway is also called King Olav's Road.

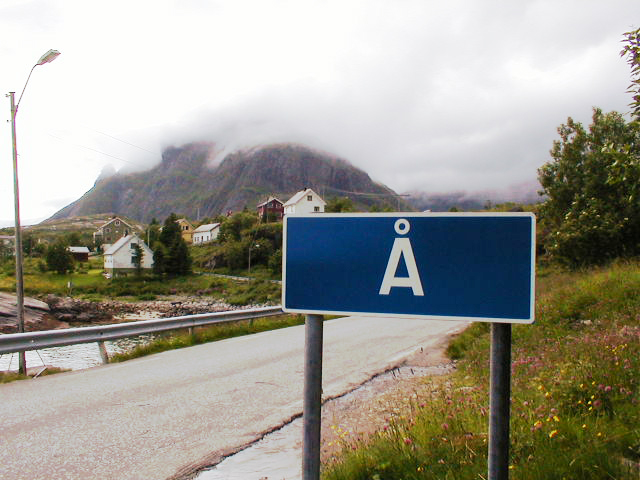
The frequently stolen road sign approaching the village of Å

Until the 1990s, Å was mainly a small fishing village specializing in stockfish, but since then tourism has taken over as the main economic activity. The town features the Lofoten Stockfish Museum and the Norwegian Fishing Village Museum as two big tourist attractions.

== Name ==
The village (originally a farm) is first known to be mentioned in 1567 as "Aa". The name is from Old Norse word "á" which means "(small) river". The name was spelled "Aa" until 1917 when the Norwegian language reform changed the letter "aa" to "å". The village is sometimes referred to as Å i Lofoten ("i" means "in") to distinguish it from other meanings that go by Å (see Å (disambiguation)).

== In media ==
In 2008, Joanna Lumley visited Å in the Lofoten Islands, for the BBC One television documentary Joanna Lumley: In the Land of the Northern Lights; where she learned about the village's fishing heritage, during her journey to see the aurora borealis.

== Legacy ==
The city of Å has achieved notable popularity on the internet due to its short name.

== Notable people ==
- Hank von Hell, a rock singer who was brought up here.
