= European route E10 =

Road in trans-European E-road network

E10

Route information
- Length: 880 km (550 mi)

Major junctions
- North-West end: Å, Norway
- E6 in Bjerkvik, Norway; E45 in Gällivare, Sweden; E4 in Luleå, Sweden
- South-East end: Luleå, Sweden

Location
- Countries: Norway, Sweden

Highway system
- International E-road network; A Class; B Class

European route E10 is part of the International E-road network, and the second shortest Class A reference road in this network. It begins in Å, Norway, and ends in Luleå, Sweden. The road is about 850 kilometres (530 mi) in length. The Norwegian part of the road is also named Kong Olav Vs vei (transl. King Olav V's road).

The road follows the route Å – Leknes – Svolvær – Gullesfjordbotn – Bogen (Evenes) – Bjerkvik – Kiruna – Töre – Luleå. Most of the road is paved and two-lane, with the exception of some bridges between islands in Nordland. It has a 90–100 km/h (56–62 mph) speed limit in Sweden, and is usually 7–8 meters wide, enough to make encounters between heavy vehicles trouble-free. In Norway the road is much more twisting than in Sweden, and around 6–7,5 m wide usually with a speed limit of 80 km/h (50 mph). New sections have been built 7.5 m (25 ft) wide in the last 15 years, but there are still many narrow parts left. Often, the 6 m (20 ft) width makes encounters between heavy vehicles tight. For the last 50 km, until Å, the road is mostly less than 6 m (20 ft) wide, often 5 m (16 ft). Buses and caravans should avoid driving here, but many of them do so anyway.

The name E10 was given in 1992. Before 1985, E10 was the name of the road Paris-Brussels-Amsterdam-Groningen. The road between Narvik and Kiruna was finished in 1984, before that, no road existed at all directly between the two cities; the only way to travel between them was by train (with passenger services only three times a day), or by a large detour through Finland. In 2007, the road near Lofoten was shortened by about 30 km, and the ferry-service was bypassed for the E10, with the opening of Lofast, a new road between Fiskebøl and Gullesfjordbotn. At the end of 2007, the E10 had 18 tunnels totalling 20.4 km (12.7 mi), all in Norway.

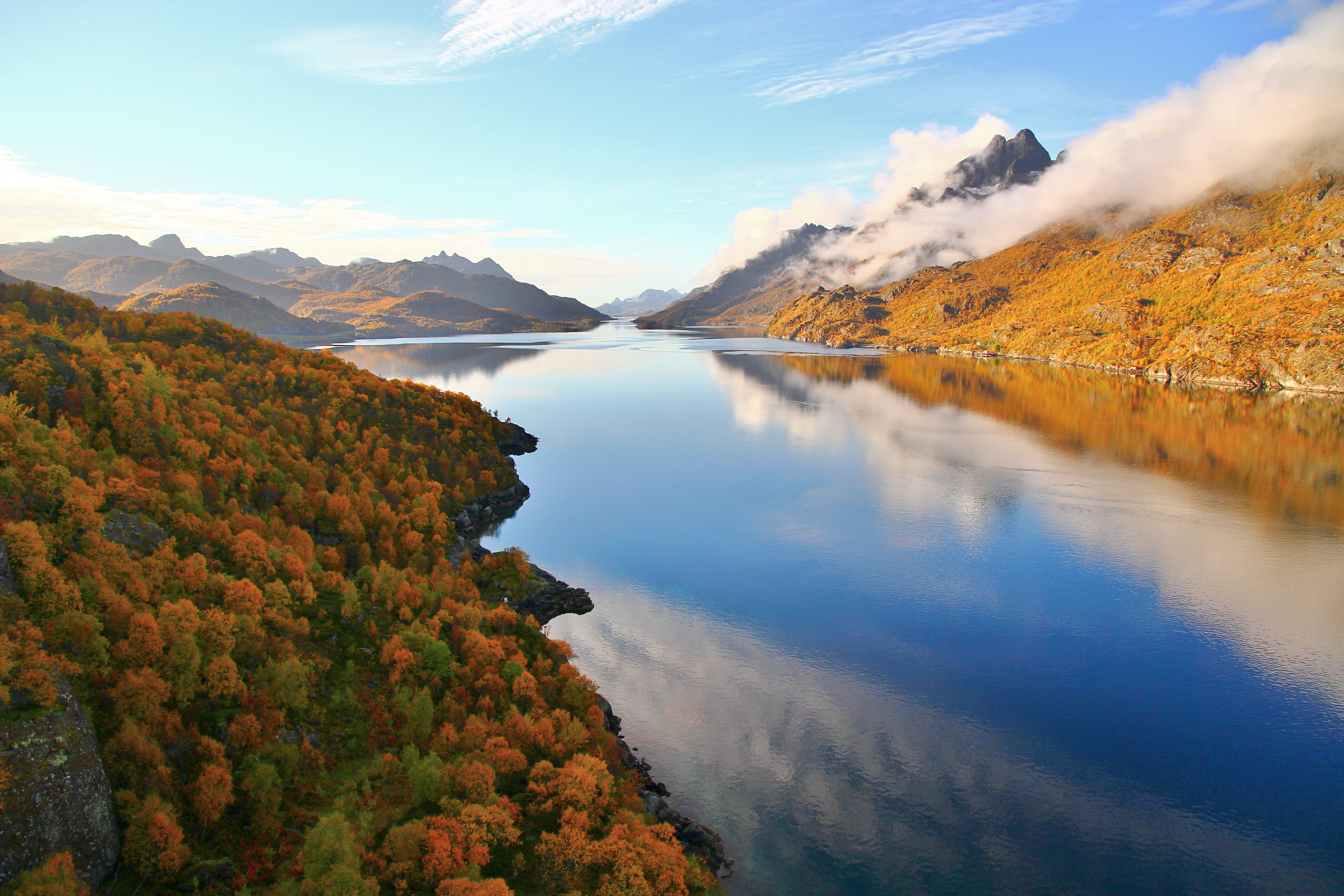
View from Raftsund Bridge, E10

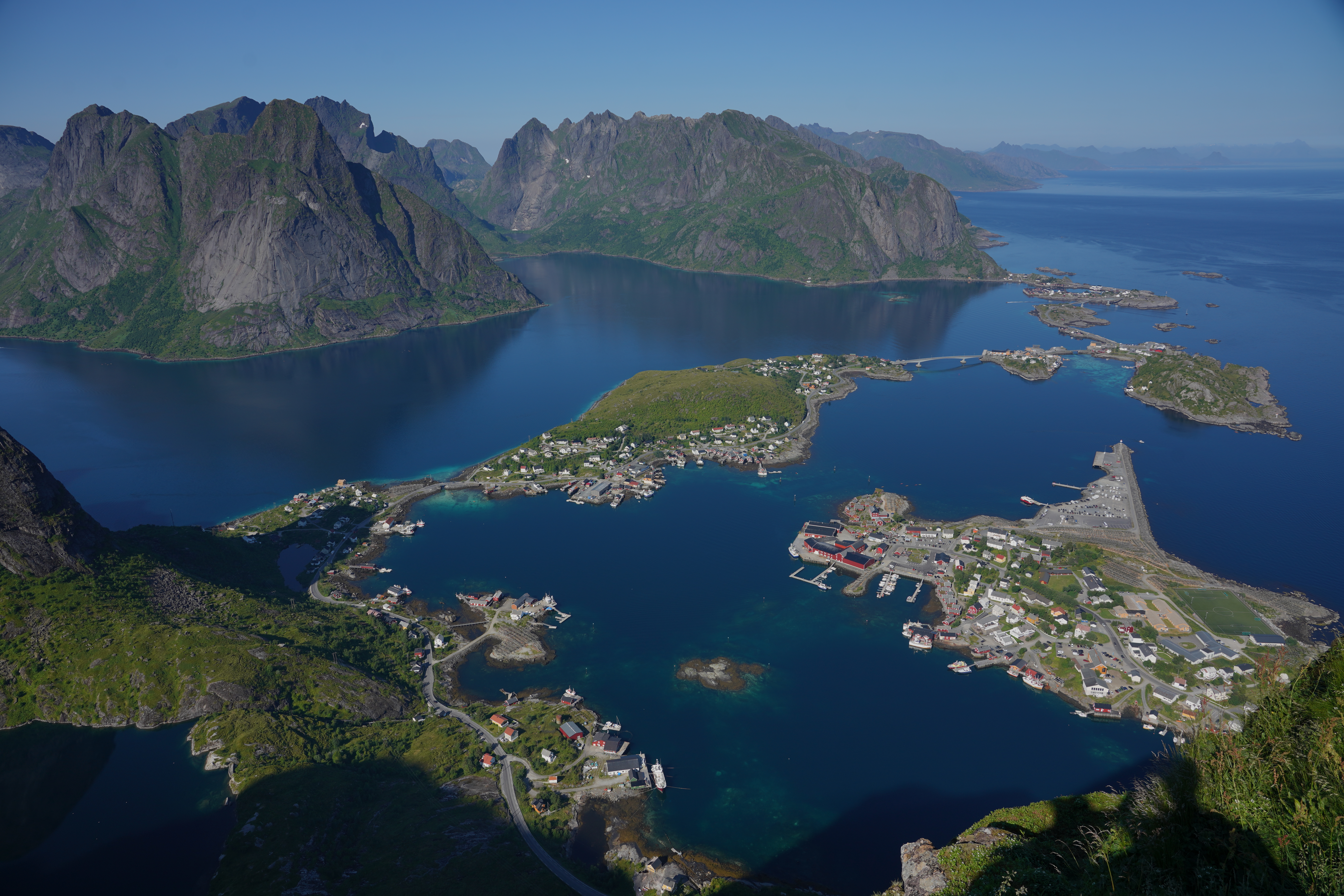
Scenery over Reine near Å in Lofoten, Norway. The E10 goes between the islands.

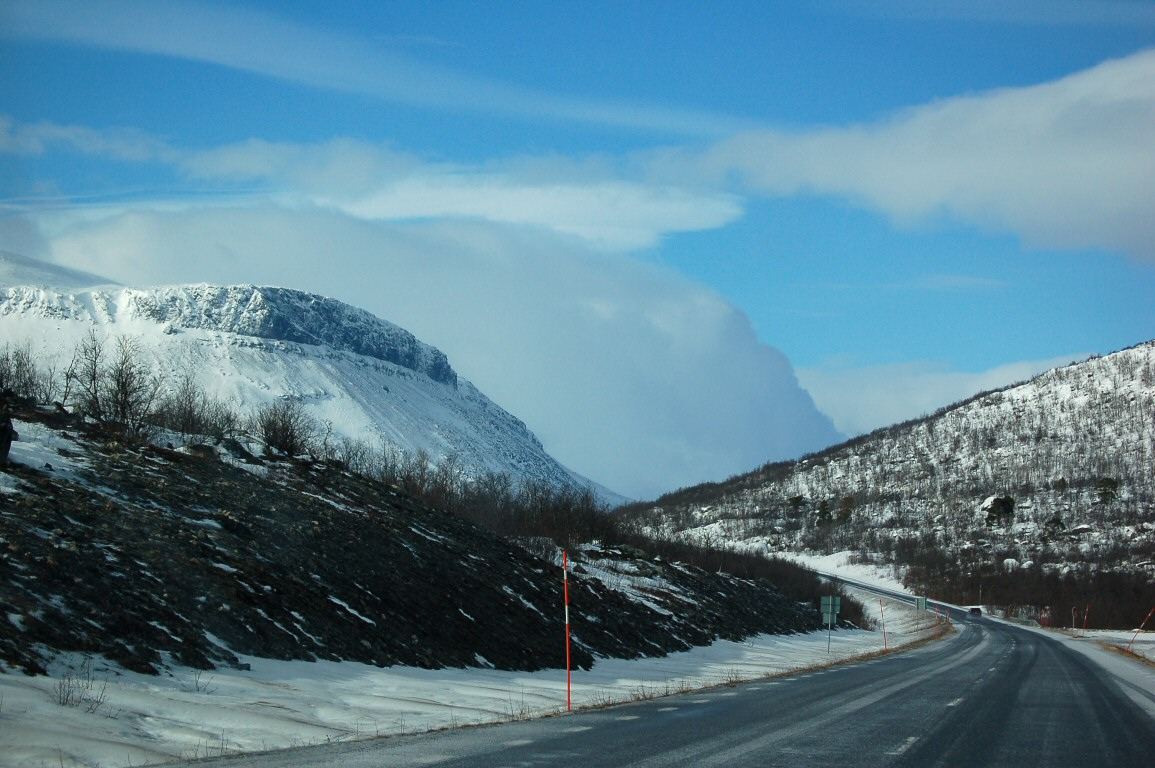
Scenery near Abisko village in Kiruna Municipality, Sweden.

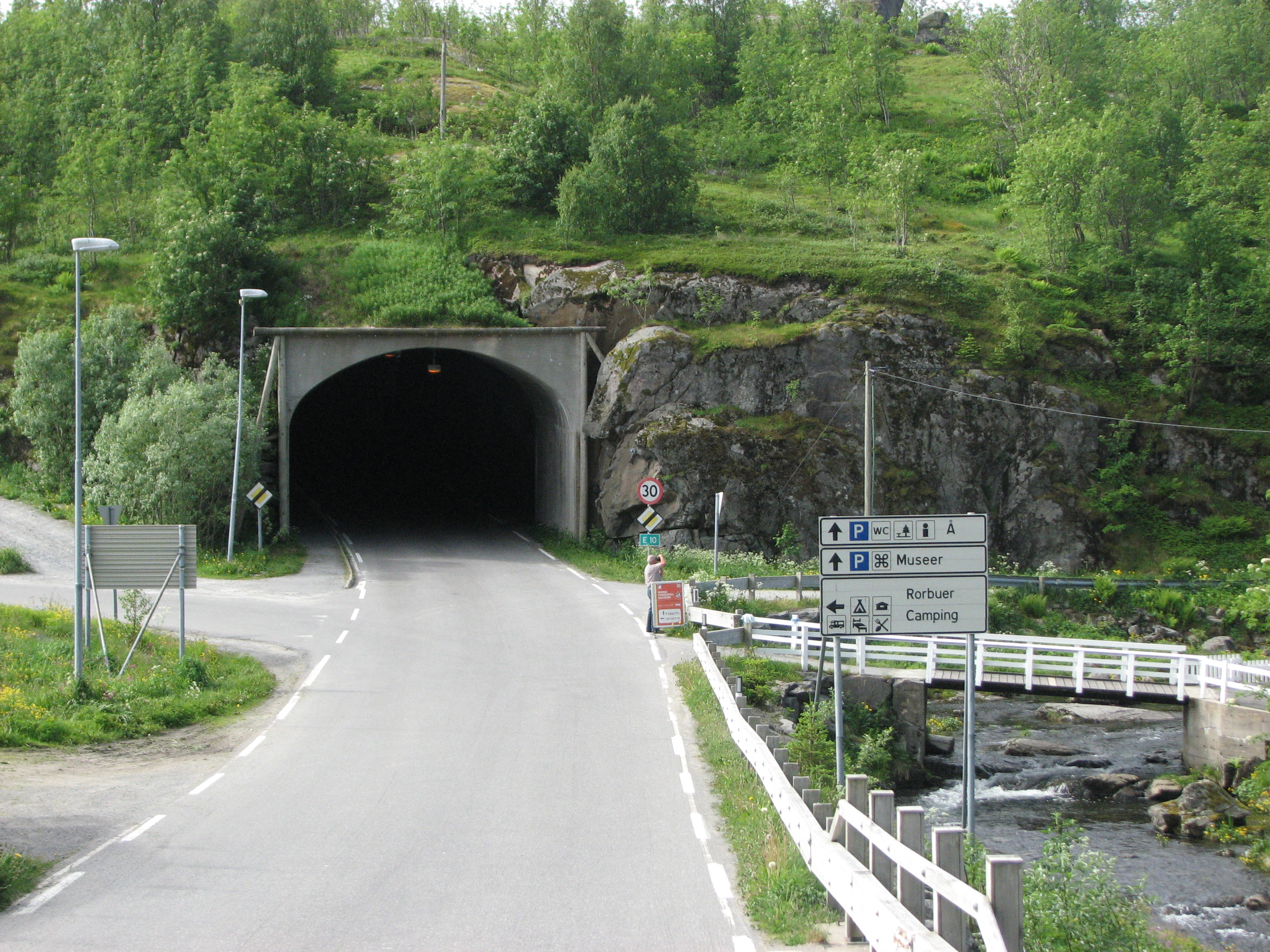
End of the E10 in Å

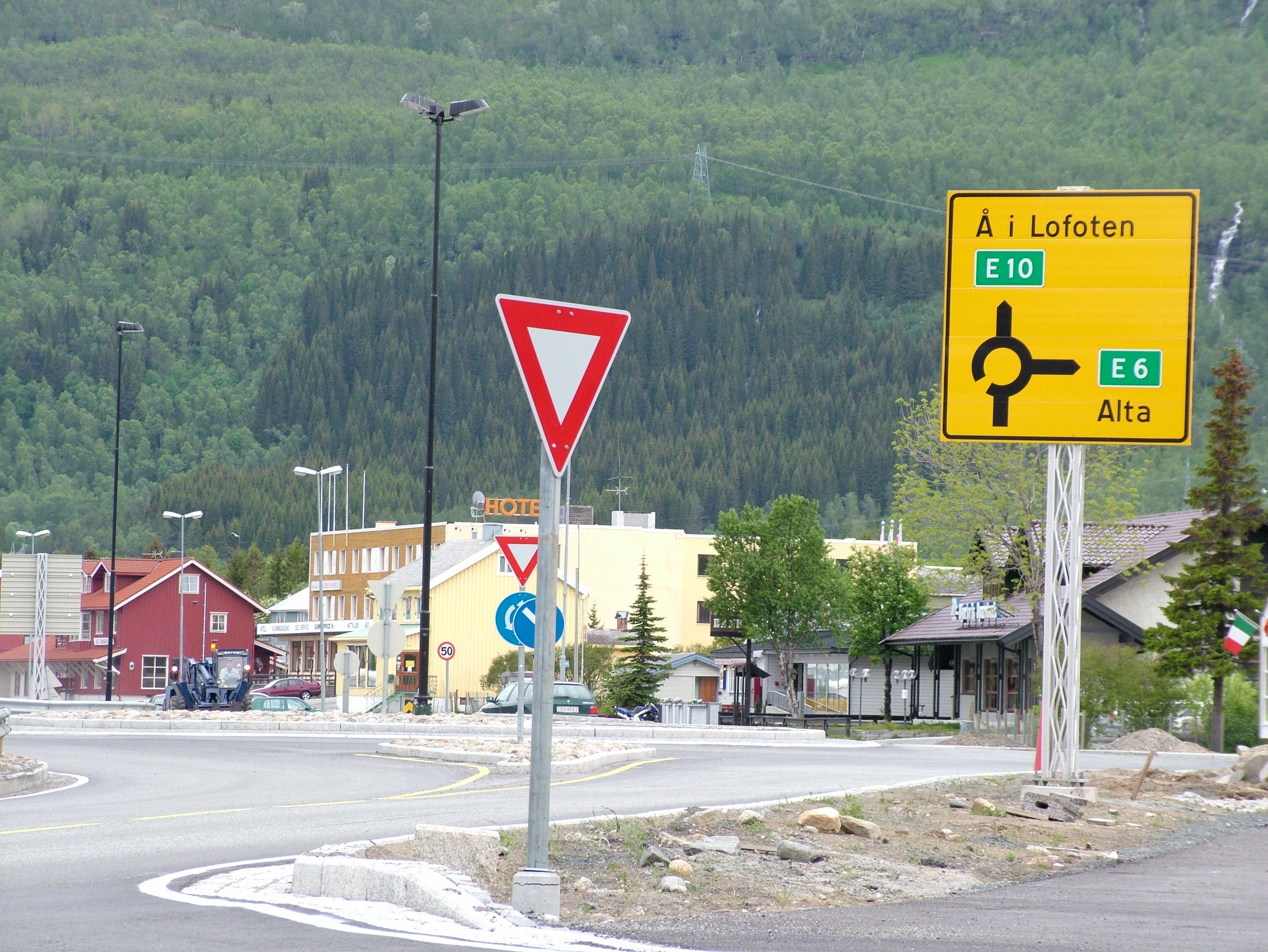
Roundabout junction of the E6 and E10 roads at Bjerkvik
