= Austnesfjorden =

Fjord in Vågan, Norway

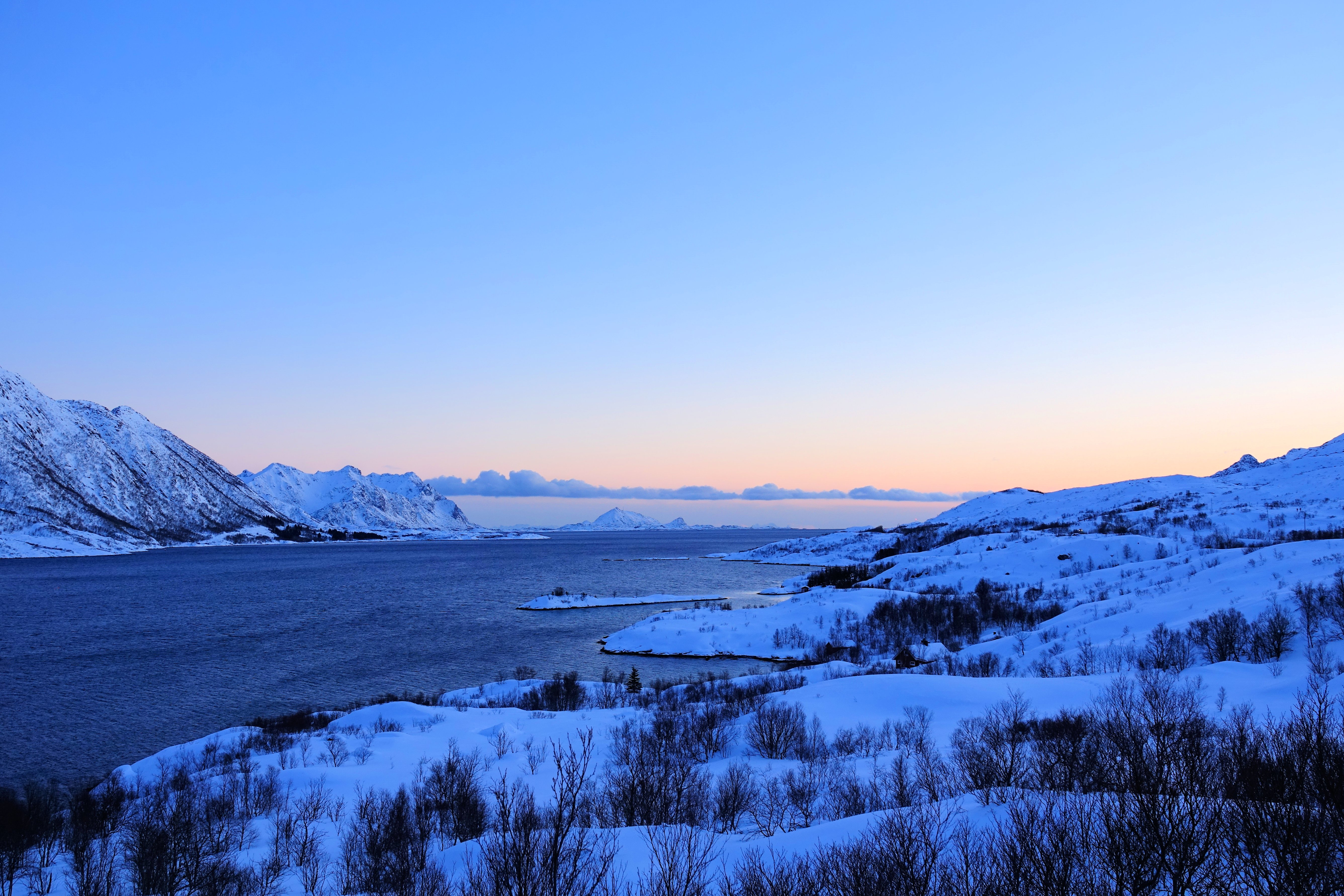
- View of the fjord
- Interactive map of the fjord
- Location: Nordland county, Norway
- Coordinates: 68.296°N 14.718°E
- Type: Fjord
- Basin countries: Norway
- Max. length: 13 kilometres (8.1 mi)

Austnesfjorden is a fjord in Vågan Municipality in Nordland county, Norway. The 13-kilometre (8.1 mi) long fjord cuts the island of Austvågøya nearly in half. On the south end, the fjord joins the Vestfjorden, just north of the town of Svolvær. The European route E10 highway runs along the western shoreline of the fjord for its entire length. The village of Laupstad lies at the innermost part of the fjord. The village of Liland and the mountain Higravstindan both lie on the eastern shore and the Sildpollneset peninsula lies on the western shore. The island of Litlmolla lies just south of the mouth of the fjord.

== See also ==
- List of Norwegian fjords
