= Digermulen =

Village in Vågan Municipality, Norway

- Village
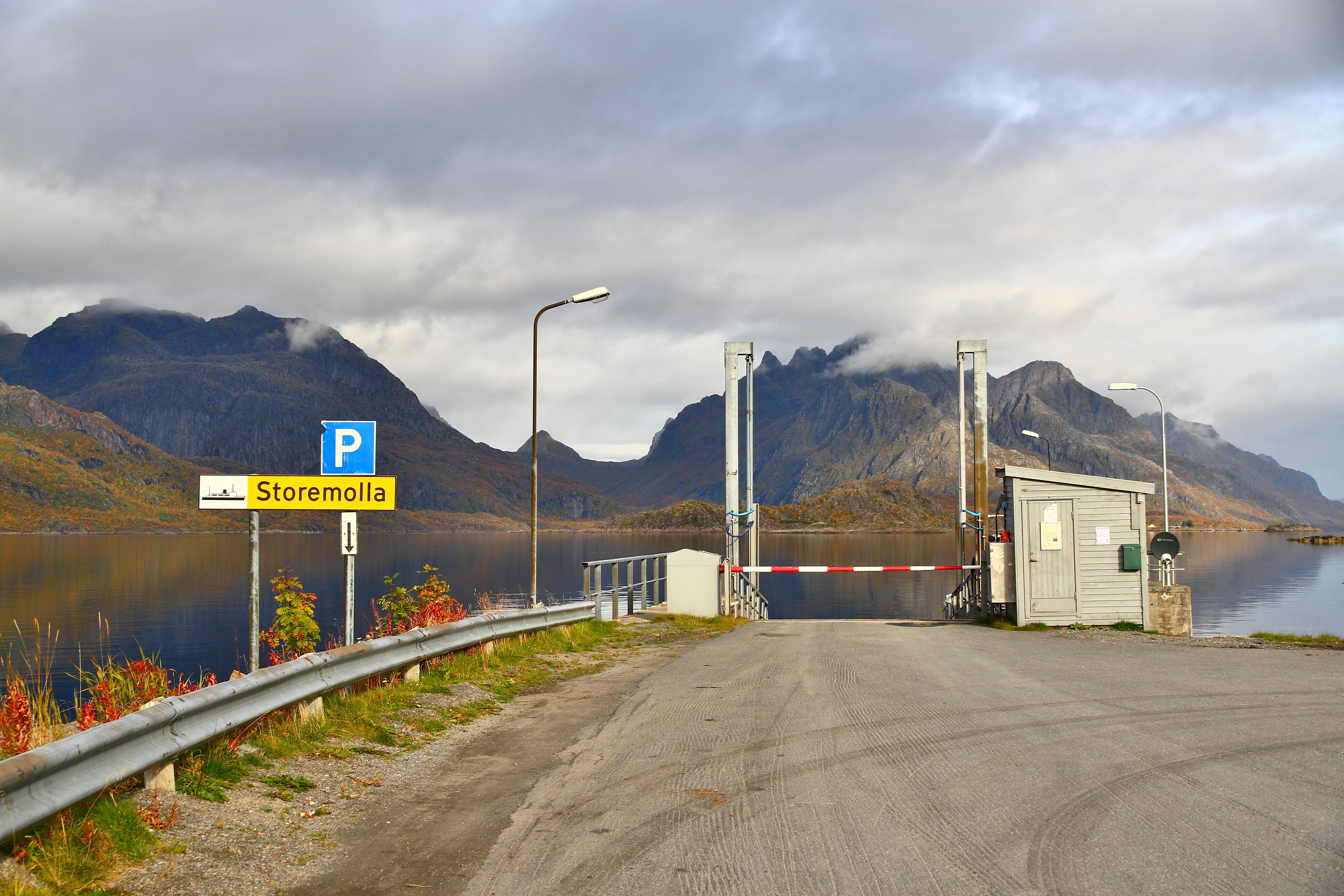
- View of the ferry dock in Digermulen
- Interactive map of Digermulen
- Location within Nordland Location within Norway
- Coordinates: 68.3132°N 14.9872°E
- Country: Norway
- Region: Northern Norway
- County: Nordland
- District: Lofoten
- Municipality: Vågan Municipality
- Elevation: 7 m (23 ft)
- Time zone: UTC+01:00 (CET)
  - Summer (DST): UTC+02:00 (CEST)
- Post Code: 8324 Digermulen

Digermulen is a village in Vågan Municipality in Nordland county, Norway. It is located on the southwestern tip of the large island of Hinnøya. It is the main village of eastern Vågan since that part of the municipality is not directly connected to the rest of the municipality (most of Vågan is on Austvågøya island). There is a long roundabout road connection through neighboring Hadsel Municipality to get to the rest of Vågan, and there is a ferry connection to the nearby island of Stormolla. Digermulen Church is located in this village.

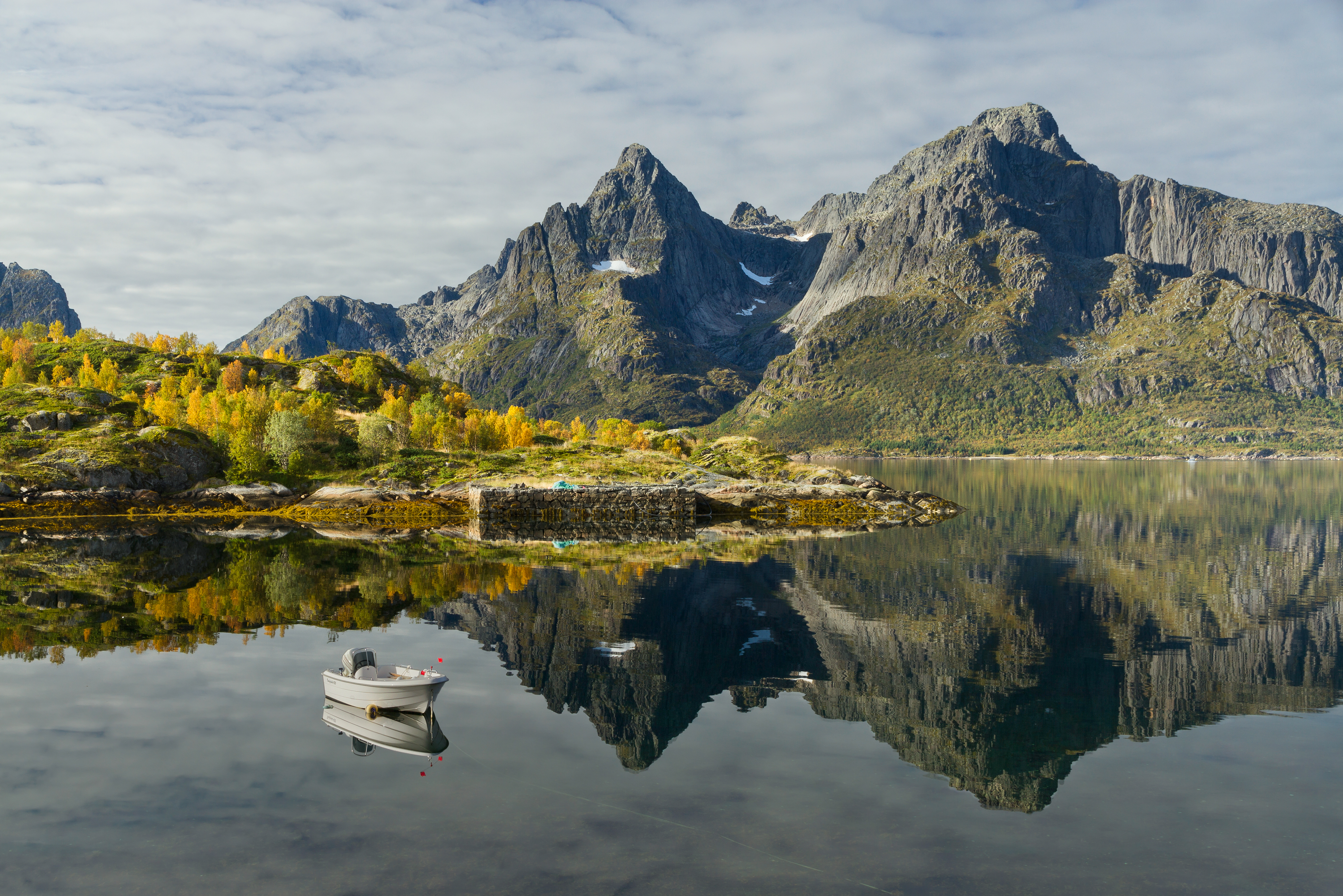
Boat with autumny mountains at Digermulen, Hinnøya, Norway, Norway. The mountains Litlkorsnestinden and Korsnestinden in the background are located on island Austvågøya. 2015
