= Sildpollneset =

Peninsula in Nordland, Norway

- Peninsula
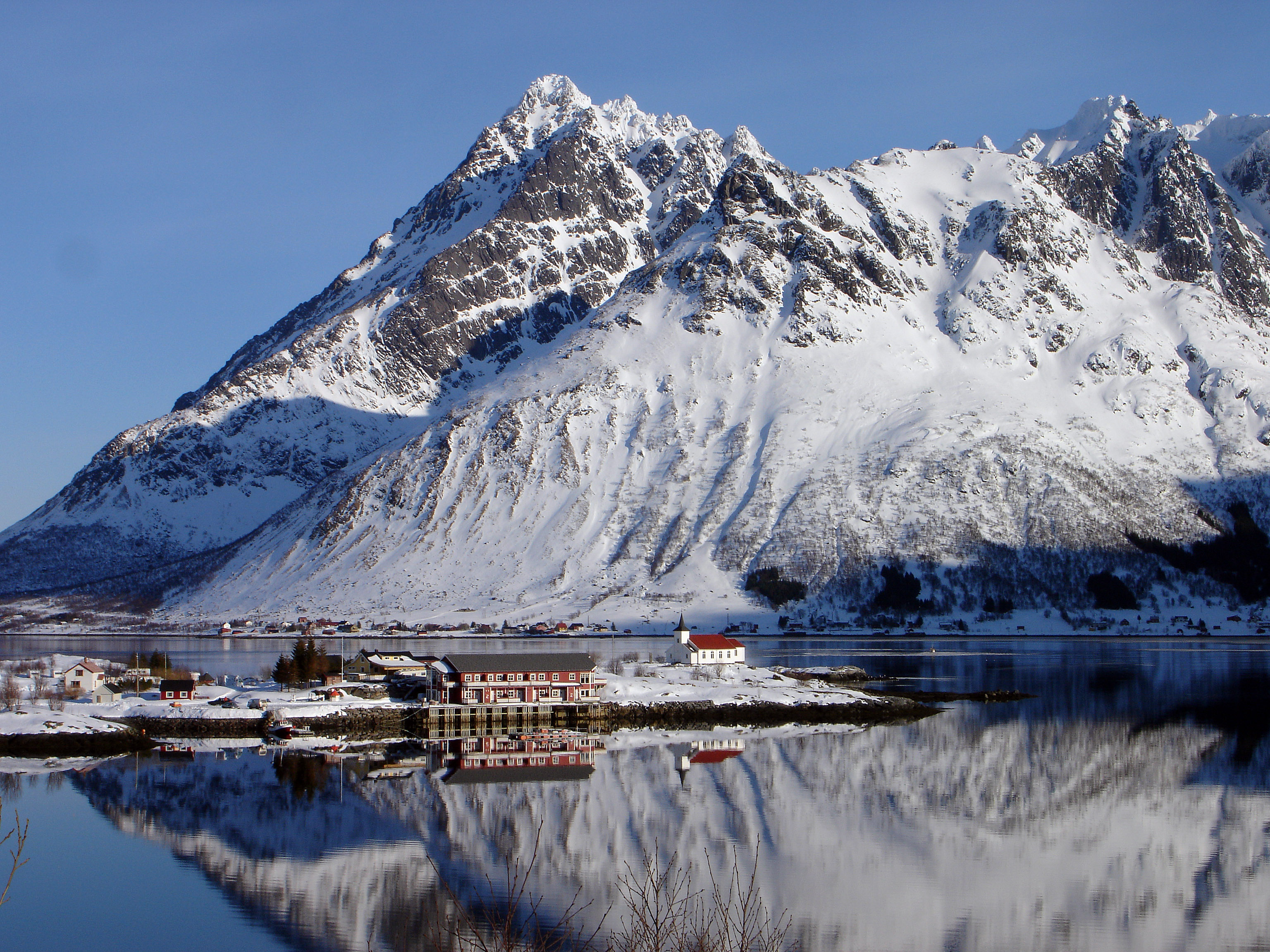
- Interactive map of the peninsula
- Coordinates: 68°19′20″N 14°43′02″E
- Location: Lofoten, Norway
- Part of: Austvågøya
- Offshore water bodies: Austnesfjorden
- Elevation: 5 m (16 ft)

Sildpollneset is a peninsula in the Austnesfjorden on the island of Austvågøya in the Lofoten archipelago. It is located in Vågan Municipality in Nordland county, Norway. It is located just east of the European route E10 highway. Sildpollnes Church is located at the end of the peninsula.
