= Svinøy Bridge =

Svinøy Bridge Svinøybrua
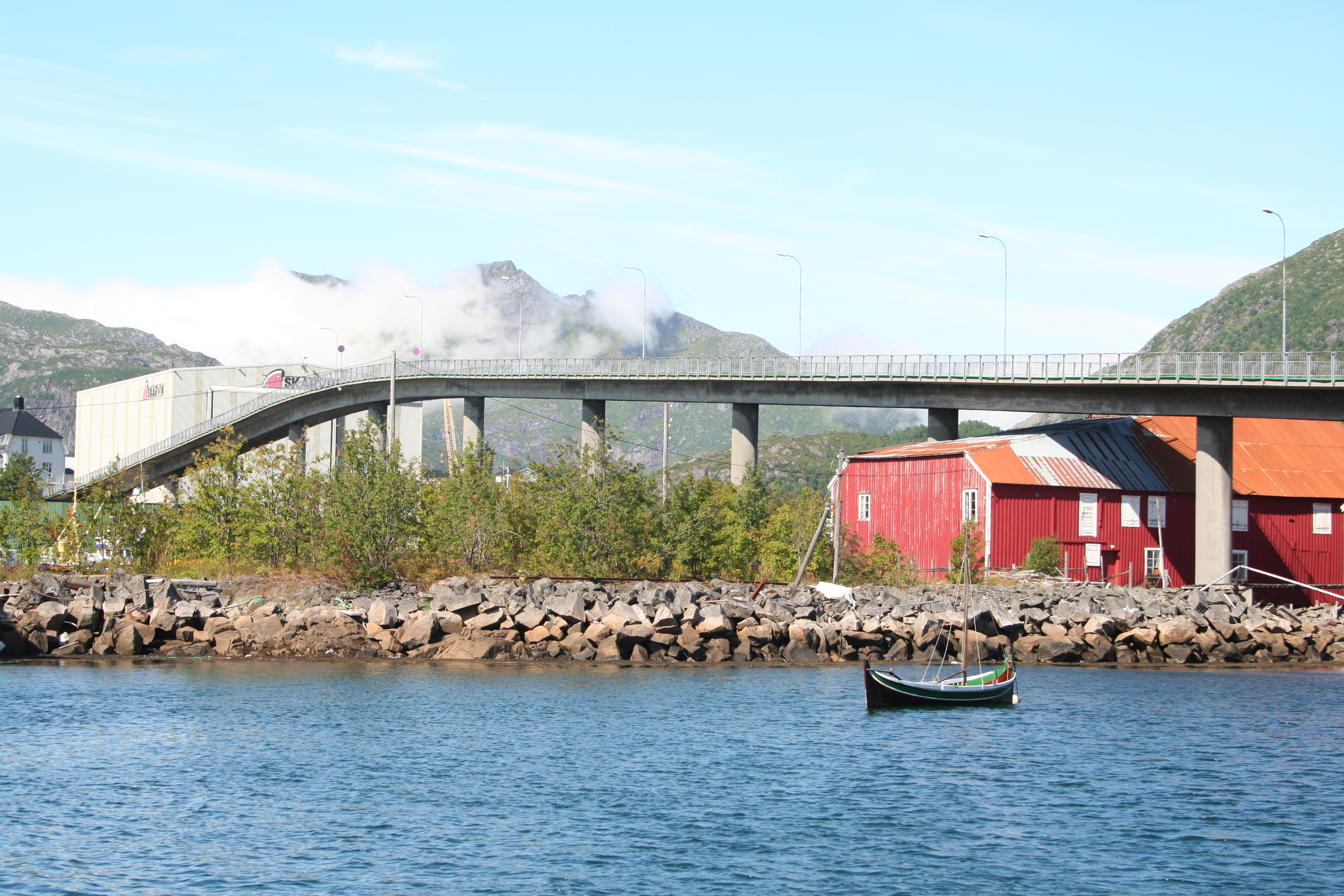
- View of the bridge
- Coordinates: 68°14′N 14°35′E
- Locale: Svolvær, Norway

Characteristics
- Total length: 359 metres (1,178 ft)
- Longest span: 24 metres (79 ft)
- Clearance below: 19 metres (62 ft)

History
- Opened: 1964

The Svinøy Bridge (Norwegian: Svinøybrua) is a cantilever road bridge in the town of Svolvær in Vågan Municipality in Nordland county, Norway. The bridge connects the small island of Svinøya with the "main island" of Austvågøya in the middle of the town of Svolvær.

The Svinøy Bridge is 359 metres (1,178 ft) long, the two main spans are 24 metres (79 ft) and 22.5 metres (74 ft) long, and the maximum clearance to the sea is 19 metres (62 ft). The bridge was opened in 1964.

== See also ==
- List of bridges in Norway
- List of bridges
