= Skrova Lighthouse =

Coastal lighthouse in Vågan, Norway

Skrova Lighthouse Skrova Fyr Saltværsholmen
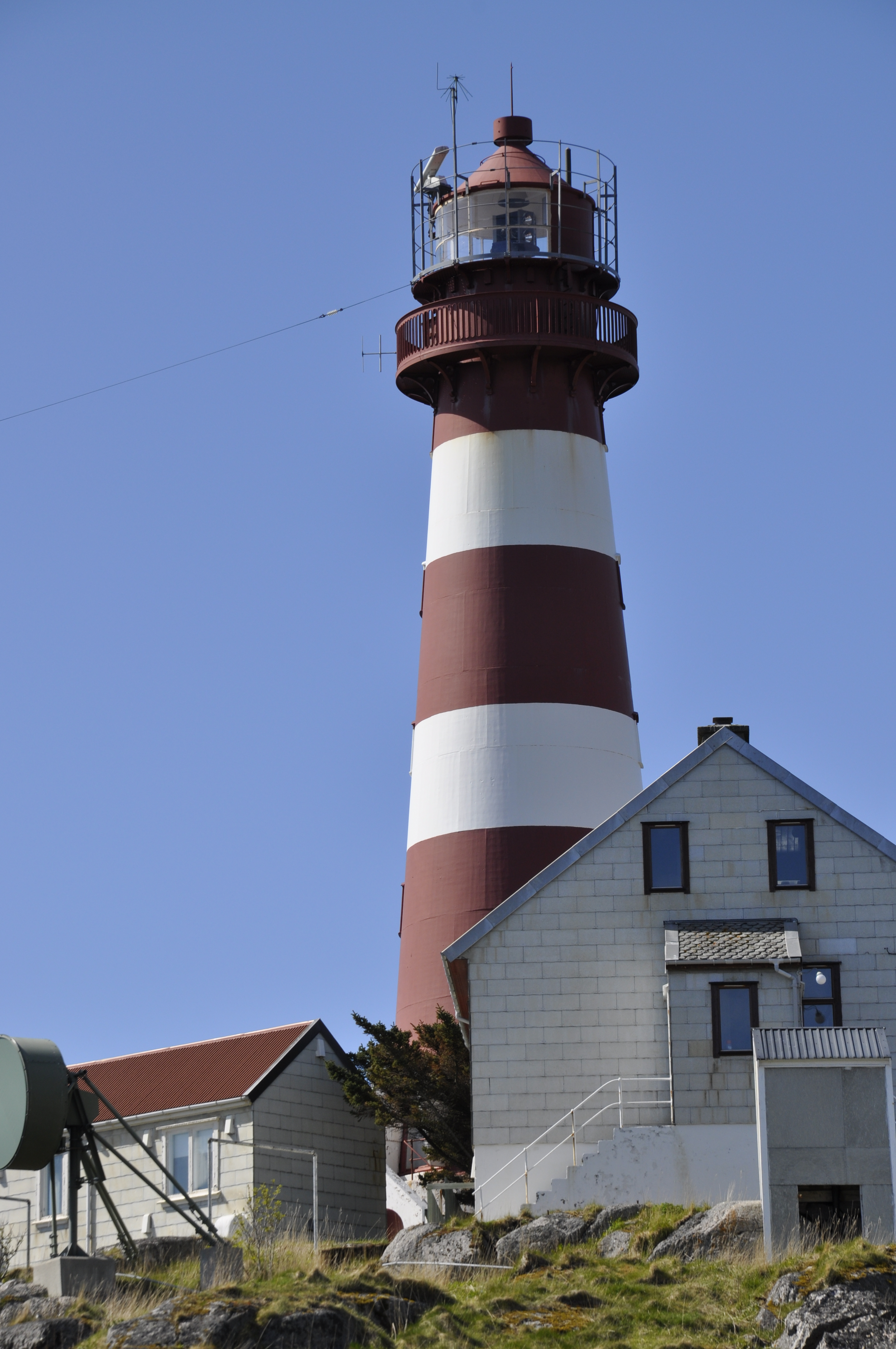
- View of the lighthouse
- Location of the lighthouse
- Location: Vågan Municipality, Nordland, Norway
- Coordinates: 68°09′11″N 14°38′56″E

Tower
- Constructed: 1922
- Construction: cast iron
- Automated: 2005
- Height: 24.5 metres (80 ft)
- Shape: Cylindrical
- Markings: Red with 2 white stripes
- Heritage: cultural heritage preservation in Norway

Light
- Focal height: 41 metres (135 ft)
- Intensity: 2,298,000 candela
- Range: 18 nmi (33 km; 21 mi)
- Characteristic: Fl(2) W 45s
- Norway no.: 747600

Skrova Lighthouse (Norwegian: Skrova fyr) is a coastal lighthouse in Vågan Municipality in Nordland county, Norway. It is located on a small skerry southwest of the island of Skrova which is in the Vestfjorden south of the island of Austvågøya.

== History ==
Skrova Lighthouse was designed by Carl Wiig in 1920, and a team of carpenters from Volda was hired to build it. It was first established in 1922 and it was automated in 2005. It was listed as a protected site in 1999. The 24.5-metre (80 ft) tall tower is red with two white horizontal stripes. The light on top gives two white flashes every 45 seconds at an elevation of 41 metres (135 ft). The 2,298,000-candela light can be seen for up to 18 nmi (33 km; 21 mi).

== Climate ==
Climate data for Skrova 1991-2020 (14 m, precipitation days 1961-90, extremes 1934-2025)
Month	Jan	Feb	Mar	Apr	May	Jun	Jul	Aug	Sep	Oct	Nov	Dec	Year
Record high °C (°F)	10.6 (51.1)	9.8 (49.6)	10 (50)	17.4 (63.3)	24.3 (75.7)	30.4 (86.7)	29.8 (85.6)	26.9 (80.4)	22.1 (71.8)	17.1 (62.8)	13 (55)	11.2 (52.2)	30.4 (86.7)
Mean daily maximum °C (°F)	2.4 (36.3)	1.6 (34.9)	2.2 (36.0)	4.8 (40.6)	9 (48)	13 (55)	16.1 (61.0)	15.4 (59.7)	12 (54)	7.8 (46.0)	5.4 (41.7)	3.6 (38.5)	7.8 (46.0)
Daily mean °C (°F)	0.9 (33.6)	0.2 (32.4)	0.7 (33.3)	3.1 (37.6)	6.8 (44.2)	10.6 (51.1)	13.6 (56.5)	13.3 (55.9)	10.4 (50.7)	6.5 (43.7)	4 (39)	2.2 (36.0)	6.0 (42.8)
Mean daily minimum °C (°F)	−1 (30)	−1.6 (29.1)	−0.9 (30.4)	1.4 (34.5)	4.9 (40.8)	8.6 (47.5)	11.5 (52.7)	11.5 (52.7)	8.8 (47.8)	4.9 (40.8)	2.2 (36.0)	0.3 (32.5)	4.2 (39.6)
Record low °C (°F)	−12.7 (9.1)	−15.1 (4.8)	−12.3 (9.9)	−8.5 (16.7)	−3.4 (25.9)	−1.2 (29.8)	3.7 (38.7)	3.9 (39.0)	−1.4 (29.5)	−4.5 (23.9)	−10.7 (12.7)	−11.9 (10.6)	−15.1 (4.8)
Average precipitation mm (inches)	89 (3.5)	81 (3.2)	65 (2.6)	49 (1.9)	46 (1.8)	37 (1.5)	50 (2.0)	48 (1.9)	79 (3.1)	88 (3.5)	97 (3.8)	90 (3.5)	819 (32.3)
Average precipitation days (≥ 1.0 mm)	14	11	11	10	9	9	11	10	15	17	15	15	147
Source 1: Norwegian Meteorological Institute
Source 2: Noaa WMO averages 91-2020 Norway

== See also ==
- Lighthouses in Norway
- List of lighthouses in Norway
