= Henningsvær Church =

- Henningsvær kirke
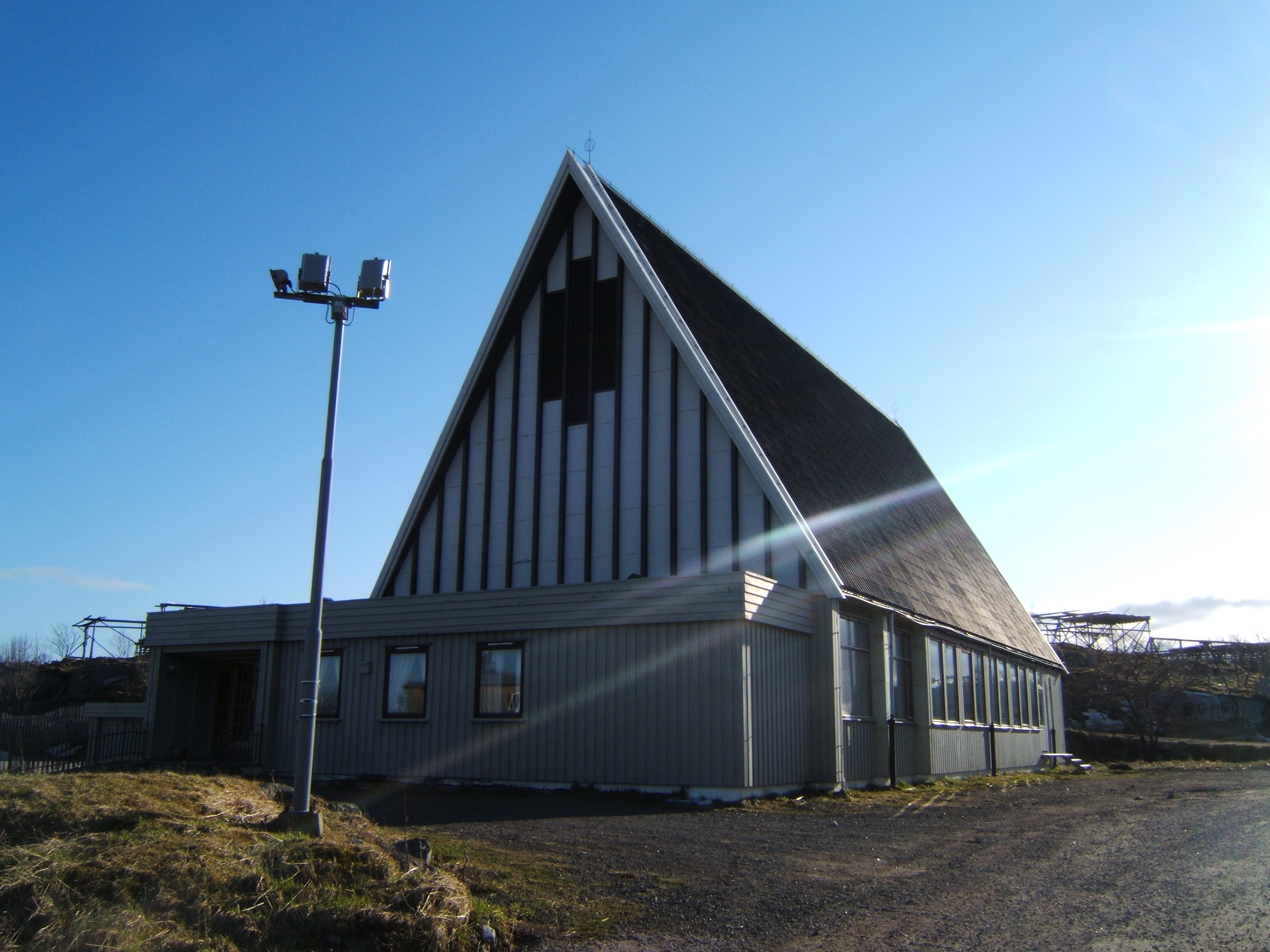
- View of the church
- Henningsvær Church
- 68.15181567°N 14.19833511°E
- Location: Vågan, Nordland
- Country: Norway
- Denomination: Church of Norway
- Churchmanship: Evangelical Lutheran

History
- Status: Parish church
- Founded: 1852
- Consecrated: 1974

Architecture
- Functional status: Active
- Architect: Odd Storm
- Architectural type: Rectangular
- Completed: 1974 (52 years ago)

Specifications
- Capacity: 250
- Materials: Wood

Administration
- Diocese: Sør-Hålogaland
- Deanery: Lofoten prosti
- Parish: Henningsvær
- Norwegian Cultural Heritage Site
- Type: Church
- Status: Not protected
- ID: 84552

Henningsvær Church (Norwegian: Henningsvær kirke) is a parish church of the Church of Norway in Vågan Municipality in Nordland county, Norway. It is located in the fishing village of Henningsvær, located on some small islands immediately south of the large island of Austvågøya. It is the church for the Henningsvær parish which is part of the Lofoten prosti (deanery) in the Diocese of Sør-Hålogaland. The white, wooden church was built in a rectangular style in 1974 using plans drawn up by the architect Odd Storm. The church seats about 250 people.

== History ==
Henningsvær Chapel was first built in Henningsvær in 1852. The church was on land donated by Jens Henrik Klæboe Dreyer in exchange for having his own chair in the new church. The old chapel was torn down in 1974 and a new church was built on the same site.

== Media gallery ==
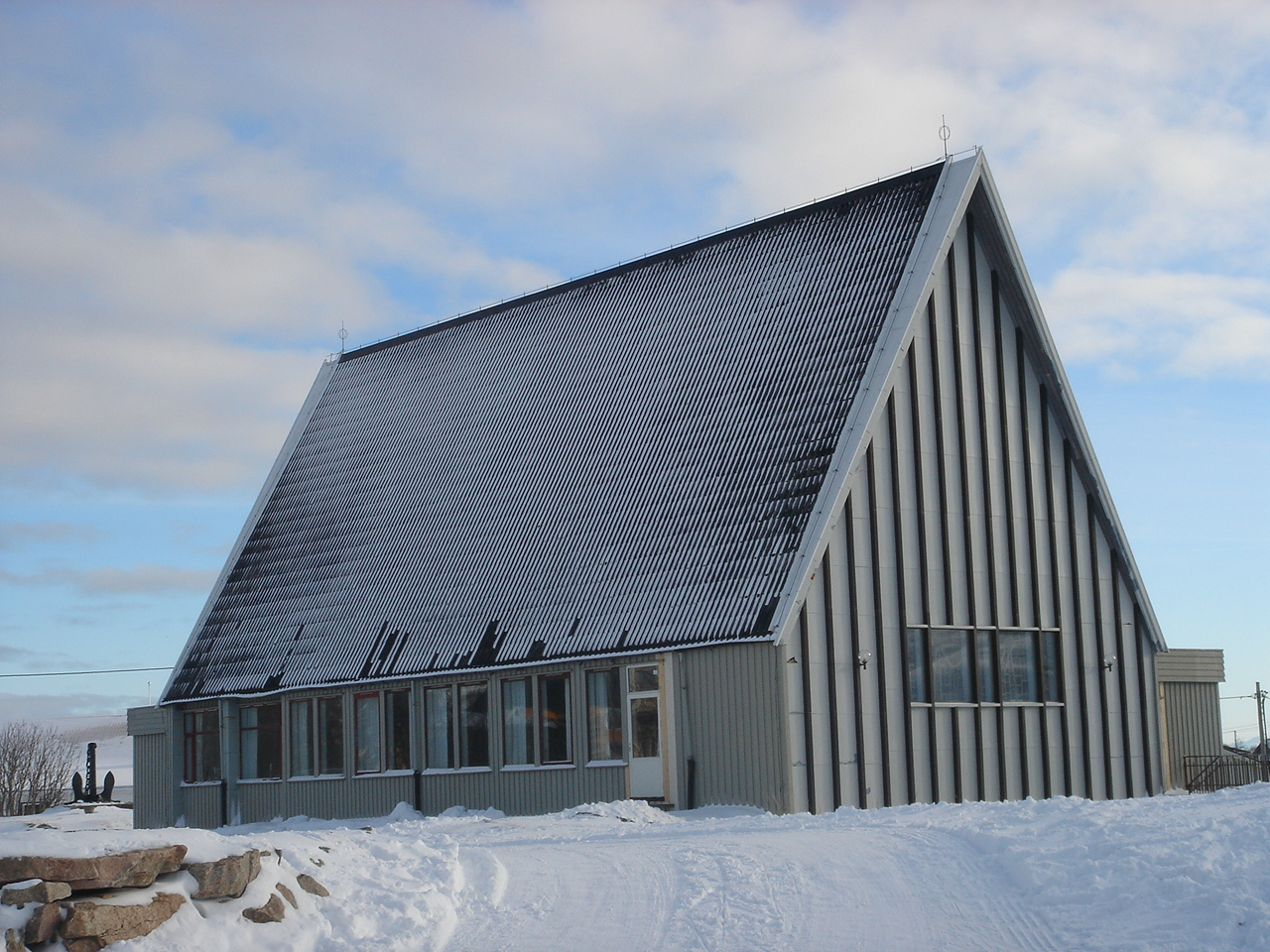

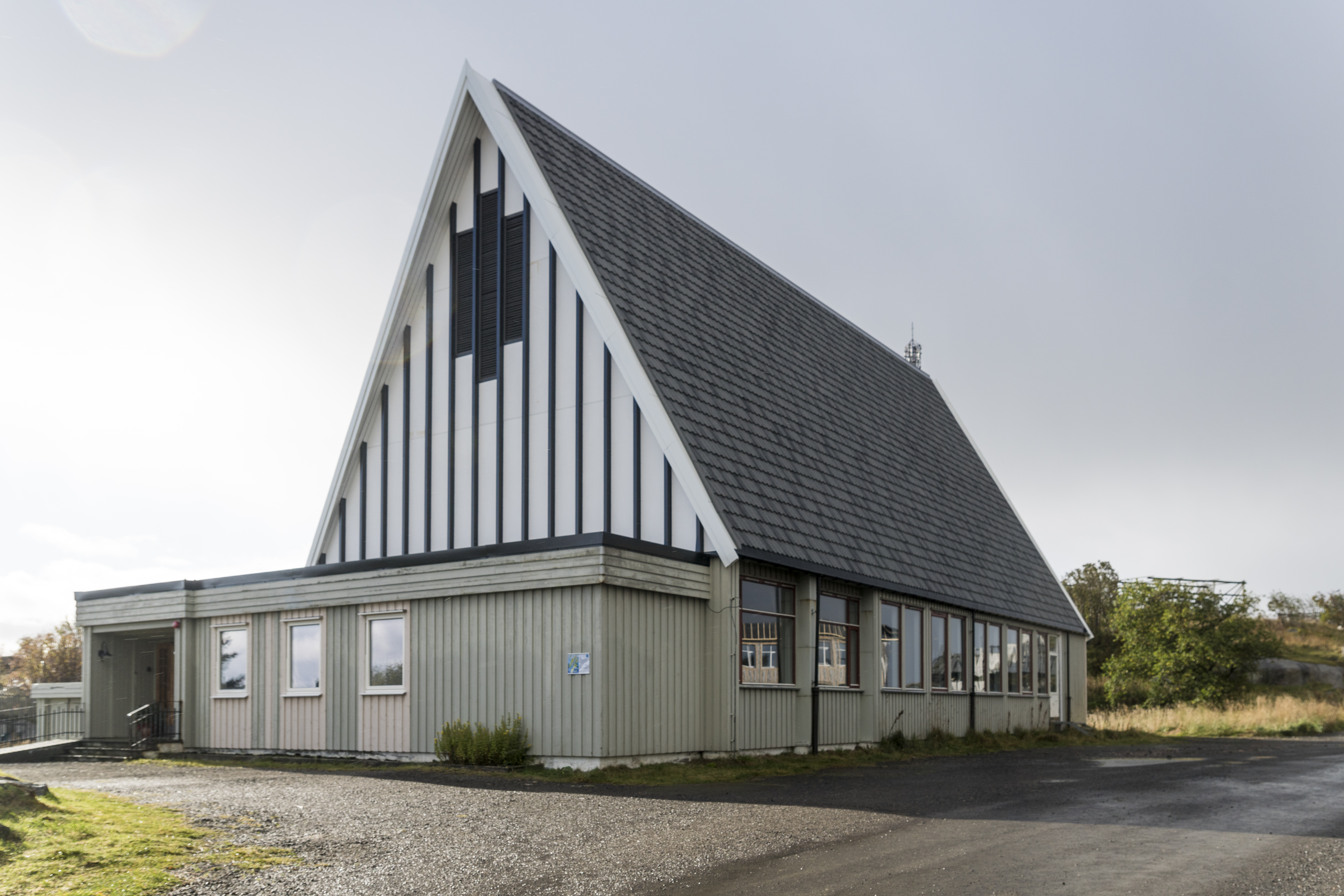

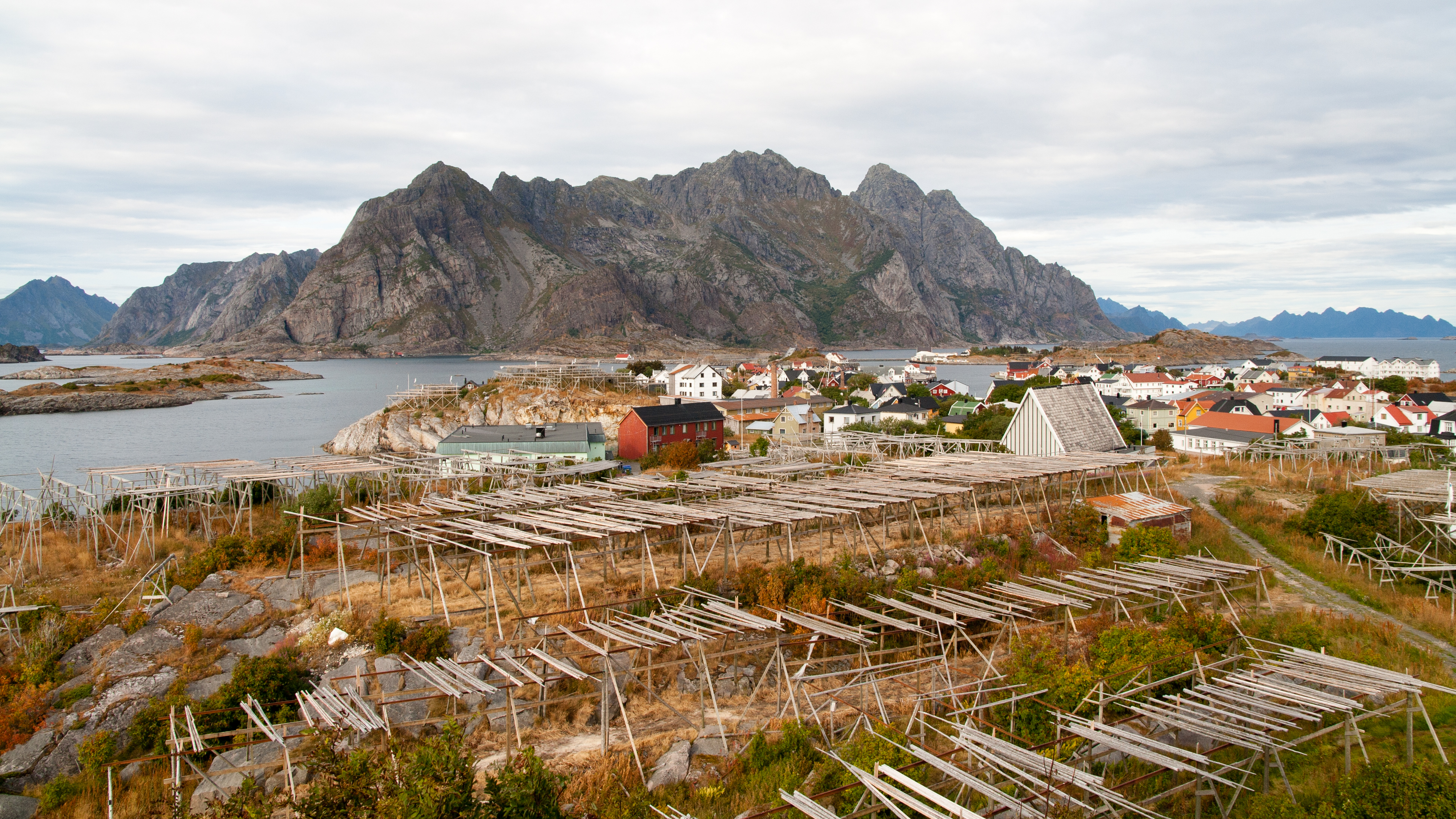

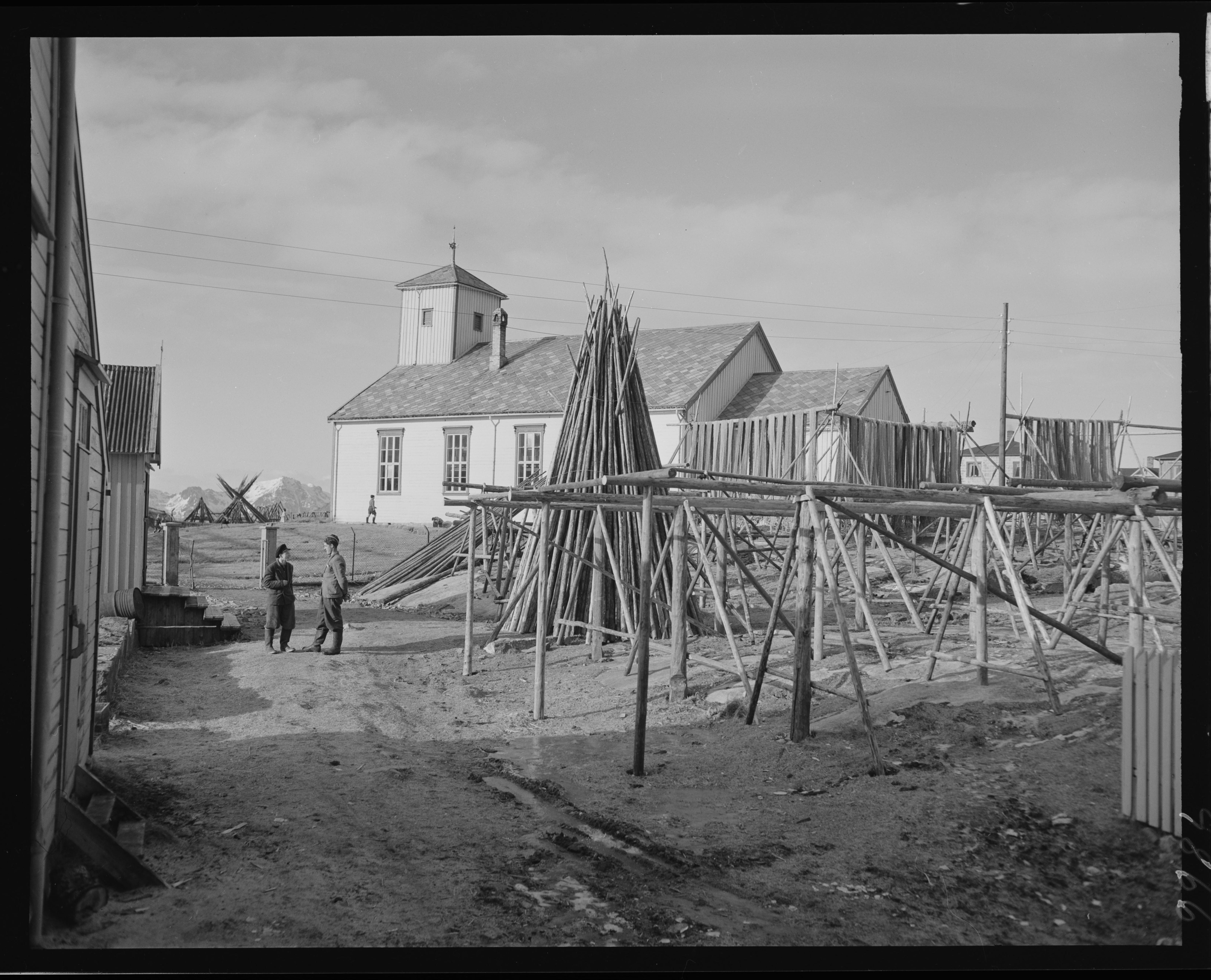
Old church (1852-1974)

== See also ==
- List of churches in Sør-Hålogaland
