= Liland, Vågan =

Village in Vågan Municipality, Norway

Liland
- Village
- Interactive map of Liland
- Location within Nordland Location within Norway
- Coordinates: 68.3371°N 14.7454°E
- Country: Norway
- Region: Northern Norway
- County: Nordland
- District: Lofoten
- Municipality: Vågan Municipality
- Elevation: 4 m (13 ft)
- Time zone: UTC+01:00 (CET)
  - Summer (DST): UTC+02:00 (CEST)
- Post Code: 8316 Laupstad

Liland is a village in Vågan Municipality in Nordland county, Norway. It is located on the island of Austvågøya, about 3 kilometres (1.9 mi) south of the village of Laupstad on the eastern bank of the Austnesfjorden. The mountain Higravtindan lies about 3 kilometres (1.9 mi) northeast of Liland.
