= Laupstad =

Village in Vågan Municipality, Norway

- Village
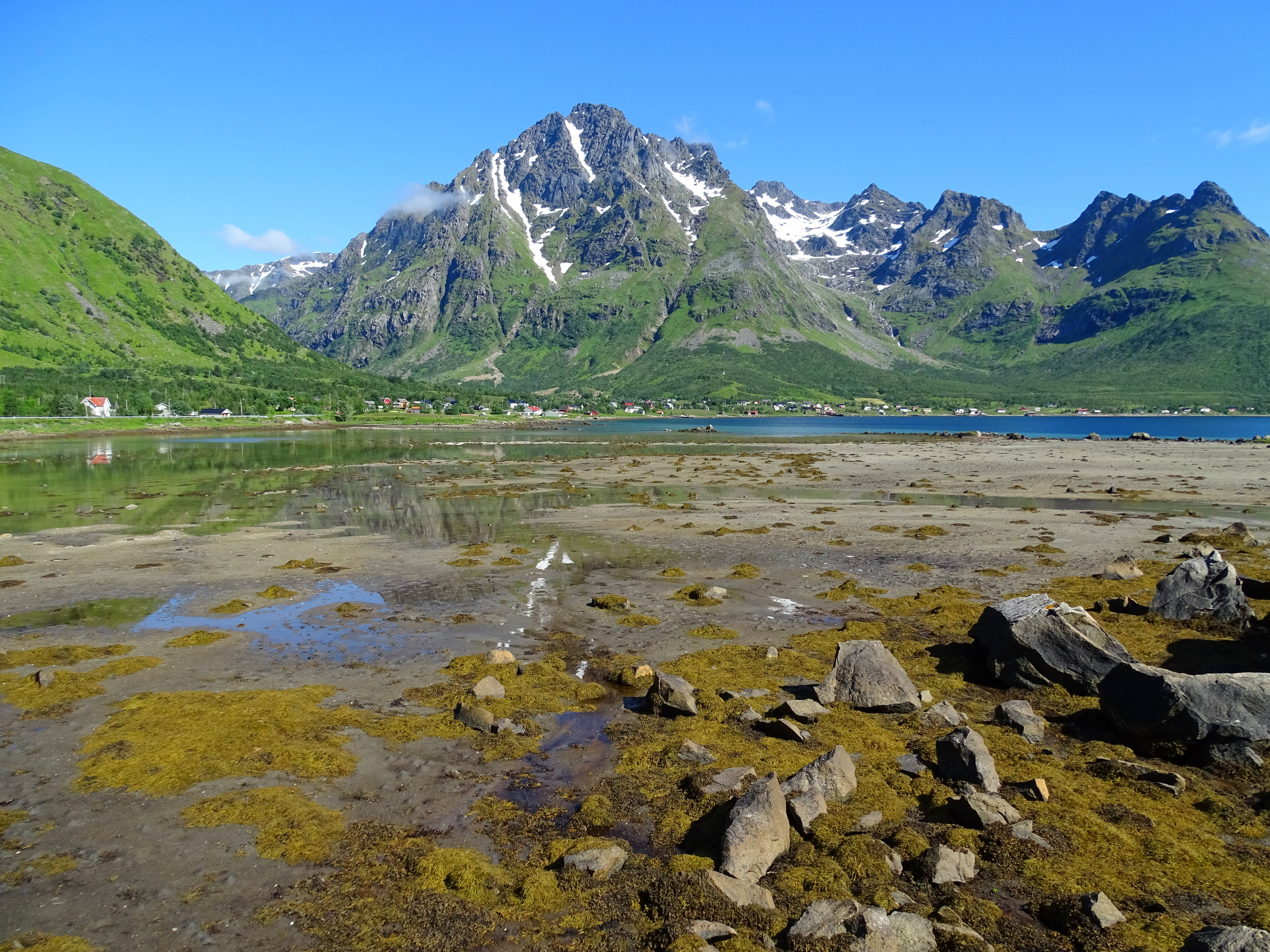
- Laupstad with Higravstindan mountain
- Interactive map of Laupstad
- Location within Nordland Location within Norway
- Coordinates: 68.3574°N 14.7233°E
- Country: Norway
- Region: Northern Norway
- County: Nordland
- District: Lofoten
- Municipality: Vågan Municipality
- Elevation: 7 m (23 ft)
- Time zone: UTC+01:00 (CET)
  - Summer (DST): UTC+02:00 (CEST)
- Post Code: 8316 Laupstad

Laupstad is a village in Vågan Municipality in Nordland county, Norway. It is located on the island of Austvågøya at the end of the Austnesfjorden, about 3 kilometres (1.9 mi) north of the village of Liland. The European route E10 highway runs through the village. The mountain Higravstindan lies about 3 kilometres (1.9 mi) east of Laupstad and the boundary with Hadsel Municipality lies just north of the village.
