= Sildpollnes Church =

- Sildpollnes kirke
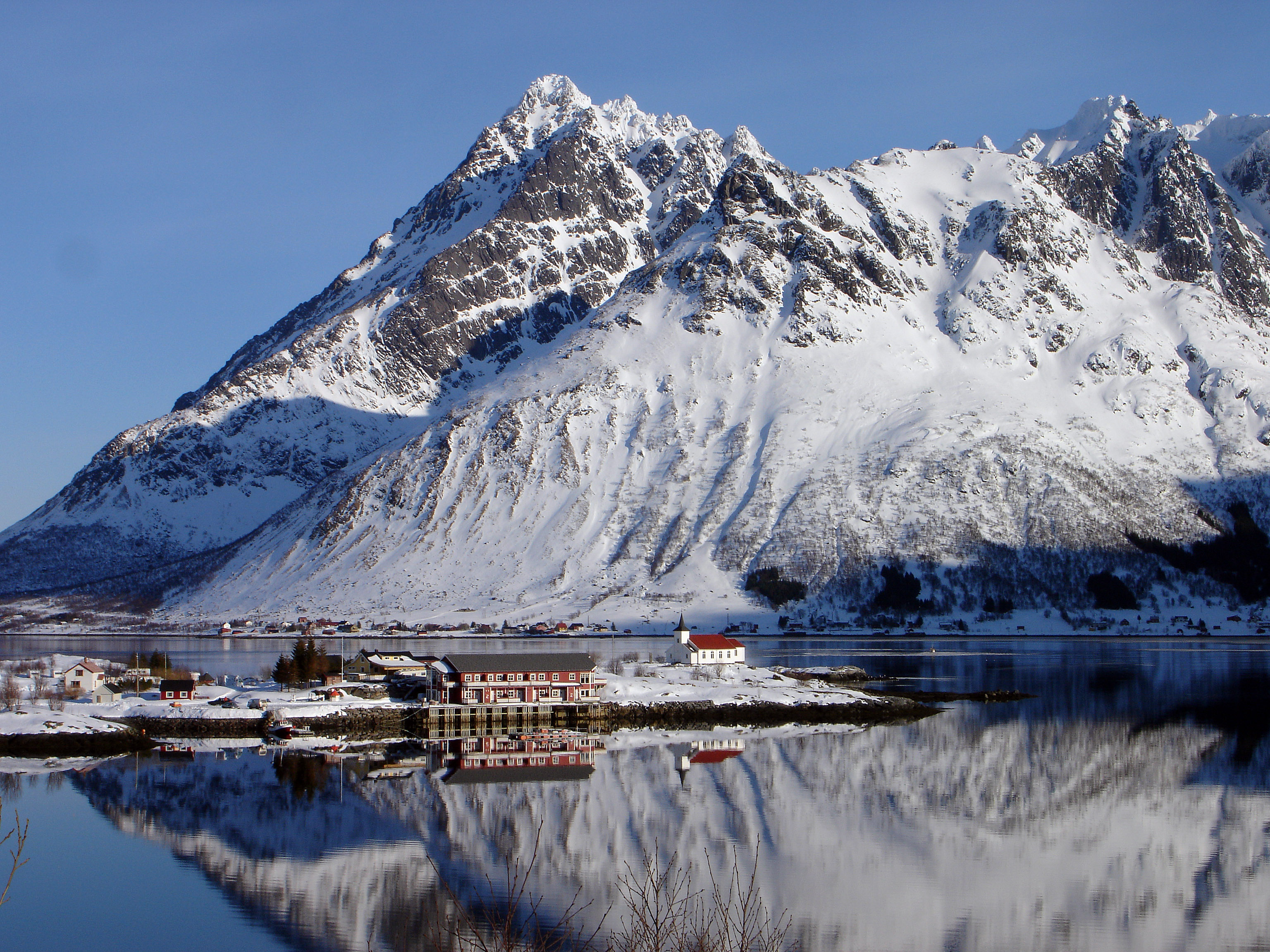
- View of the chapel
- Sildpollnes Church
- 68.3223522°N 14.72005158°E
- Location: Vågan, Nordland
- Country: Norway
- Denomination: Church of Norway
- Churchmanship: Evangelical Lutheran

History
- Status: Chapel
- Founded: 1891
- Consecrated: 19 June 1960

Architecture
- Functional status: Active
- Architectural type: Long church
- Completed: 1891 (135 years ago)

Specifications
- Capacity: 100
- Materials: Wood

Administration
- Diocese: Sør-Hålogaland
- Deanery: Lofoten prosti
- Parish: Svolvær
- Norwegian Cultural Heritage Site
- Type: Church
- Status: Not protected
- ID: 85430

Sildpollnes Church (Norwegian: Sildpollnes kirke) is a chapel of the Church of Norway in Vågan Municipality in Nordland county, Norway. It is located on the Sildpollneset peninsula on the island of Austvågøya. It is an annex chapel in the Svolvær parish which is part of the Lofoten prosti (deanery) in the Diocese of Sør-Hålogaland. The white, wooden chapel was built in a long church style in 1891.

The church is a very popular tourist location due to its location close to European route E10 on a peninsula in the middle of a fjord with mountains in the background.

== History ==
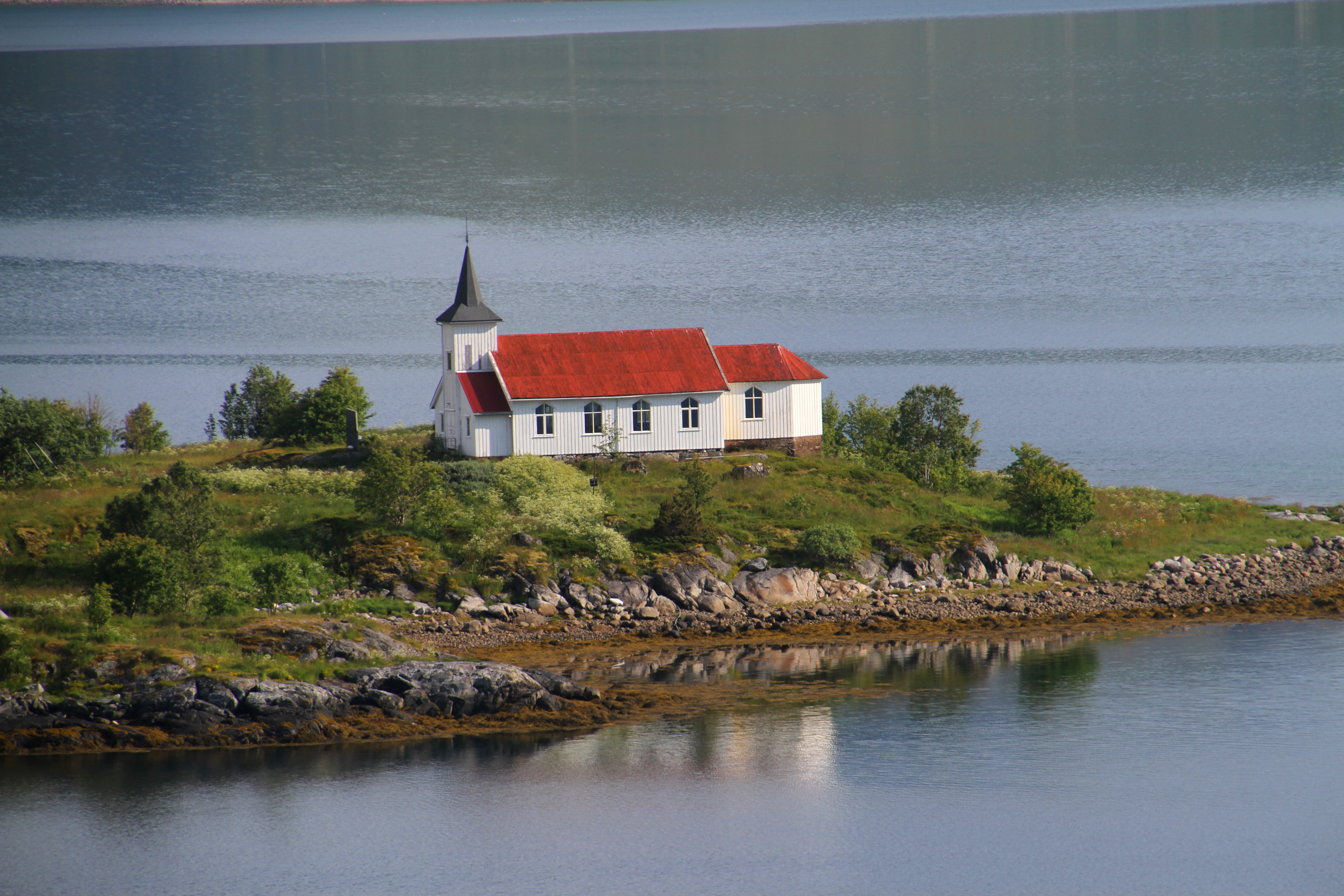
Sildpollnes church

The first church building in Sildpollnes was constructed in 1890-1891 as a bedehus (meeting/prayer house). As the years passed, the church was slightly expanded in 1924 and 1928, including the addition of a tower over an entry porch. In 1908 a cemetery was built in nearby Kvalvik, so funerals began to be held at Sildpollnes. On 19 June 1960, the bedehus was consecrated as a full annex chapel for the parish. Bishop Hans Edvard Wisløff led the consecration. An organ, baptismal font, and altarpiece were added to the building and worship services, weddings, and confirmations began to be held in the building.

The church sits on a small peninsula that is surrounded by water on three sides. Before the building of the church in 1890, the parish received permission to build a pathway through the neighbor's private property to access the church. For over 100 years, this agreement was in effect with no problems. In 2015, the church was closed because the current neighbor refused to let people through his property to reach the church because he said the 1890 agreement only covered pedestrians, not automobiles. The case was in court for some time and in 2018, the Lofoten District Court ruled in favor of the church, permitting people to use the driveway once again.

== See also ==
- List of churches in Sør-Hålogaland
