= Stormolla =

Island in Nordland, Norway

Stormolla Molla
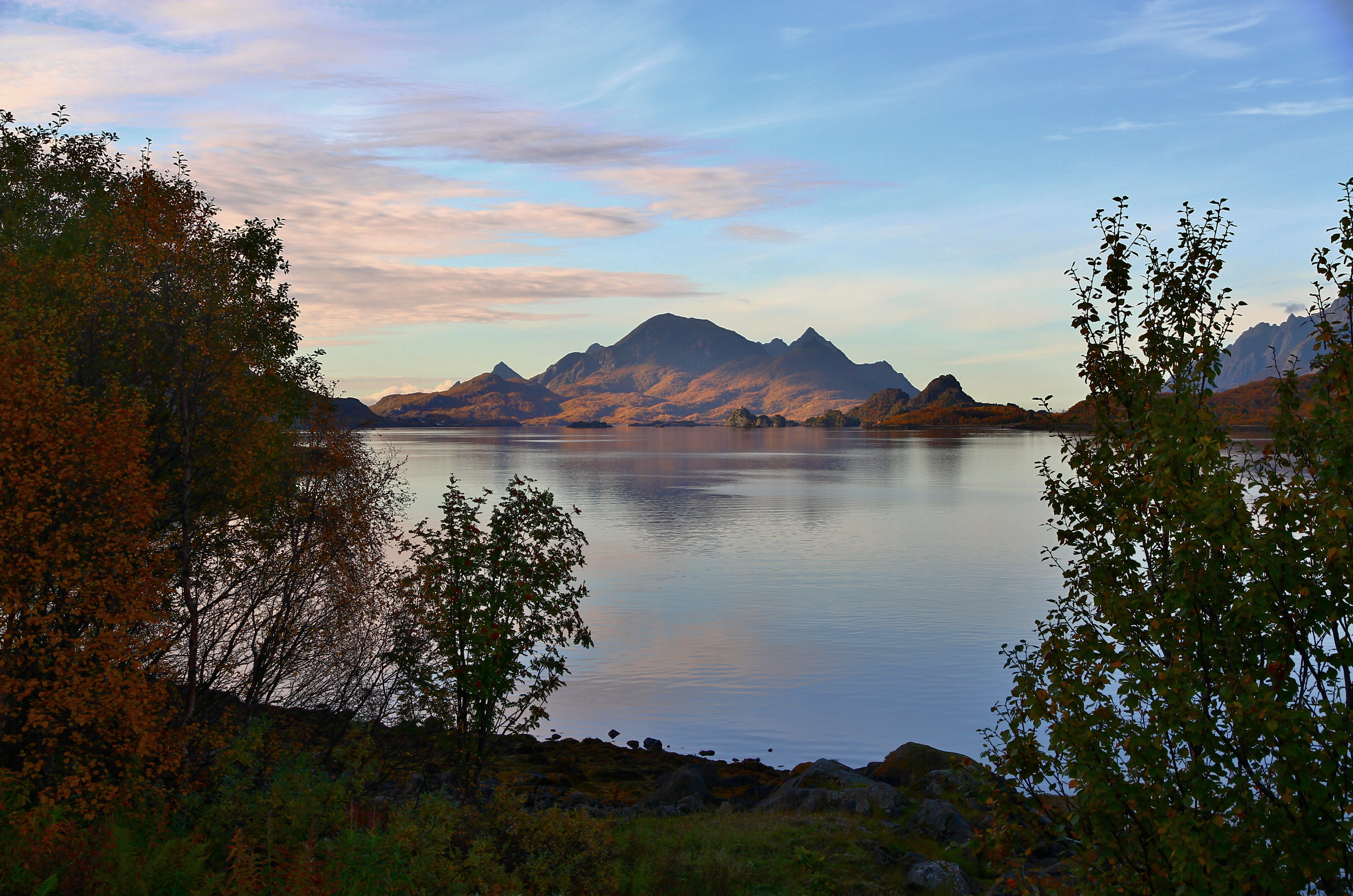
- Interactive map of Stormolla; Molla

Geography
- Location: Nordland, Norway
- Coordinates: 68.2632°N 14.8433°E
- Archipelago: Lofoten
- Area: 35.3 km^{2} (13.6 sq mi)
- Length: 10 km (6 mi)
- Width: 5 km (3.1 mi)
- Highest elevation: 751 m (2464 ft)
- Highest point: Heggedalstinden

Administration
- Norway
- County: Nordland
- Municipality: Vågan Municipality

Demographics
- Population: 16 (2017)

Stormolla or Molla is an island in Vågan Municipality in Nordland county, Norway. It is located in the Lofoten islands, south of the large islands of Austvågøya and Hinnøya and northeast of the smaller islands of Litlmolla and Skrova. The highest point on the island is the 751-metre (2,464 ft) tall mountain Heggedalstinden.

The 35.3-square-kilometre (13.6 sq mi) island has a ferry connection from the northern tip of the island to the village of Digermulen on the neighboring island of Hinnøya. Most of the 16 residents (2017) live in the small fishing village of Brettesnes on the southern tip of the island.

== See also ==
- List of islands of Norway
