= Digermulen Church =

- Digermulen kirke
- Digermulen Church
- 68.31222879°N 14.98497337°E
- Location: Vågan, Nordland
- Country: Norway
- Denomination: Church of Norway
- Churchmanship: Evangelical Lutheran

History
- Status: Parish church
- Founded: 1951
- Consecrated: 23 June 1951

Architecture
- Functional status: Active
- Architect(s): Andreas Wiel Nygaard and Torstein Schyberg
- Architectural type: octagonal
- Completed: 1951 (75 years ago)

Specifications
- Capacity: 250
- Materials: Concrete

Administration
- Diocese: Sør-Hålogaland
- Deanery: Lofoten prosti
- Parish: Svolvær
- Norwegian Cultural Heritage Site
- Type: Church
- Status: Not protected
- ID: 84024

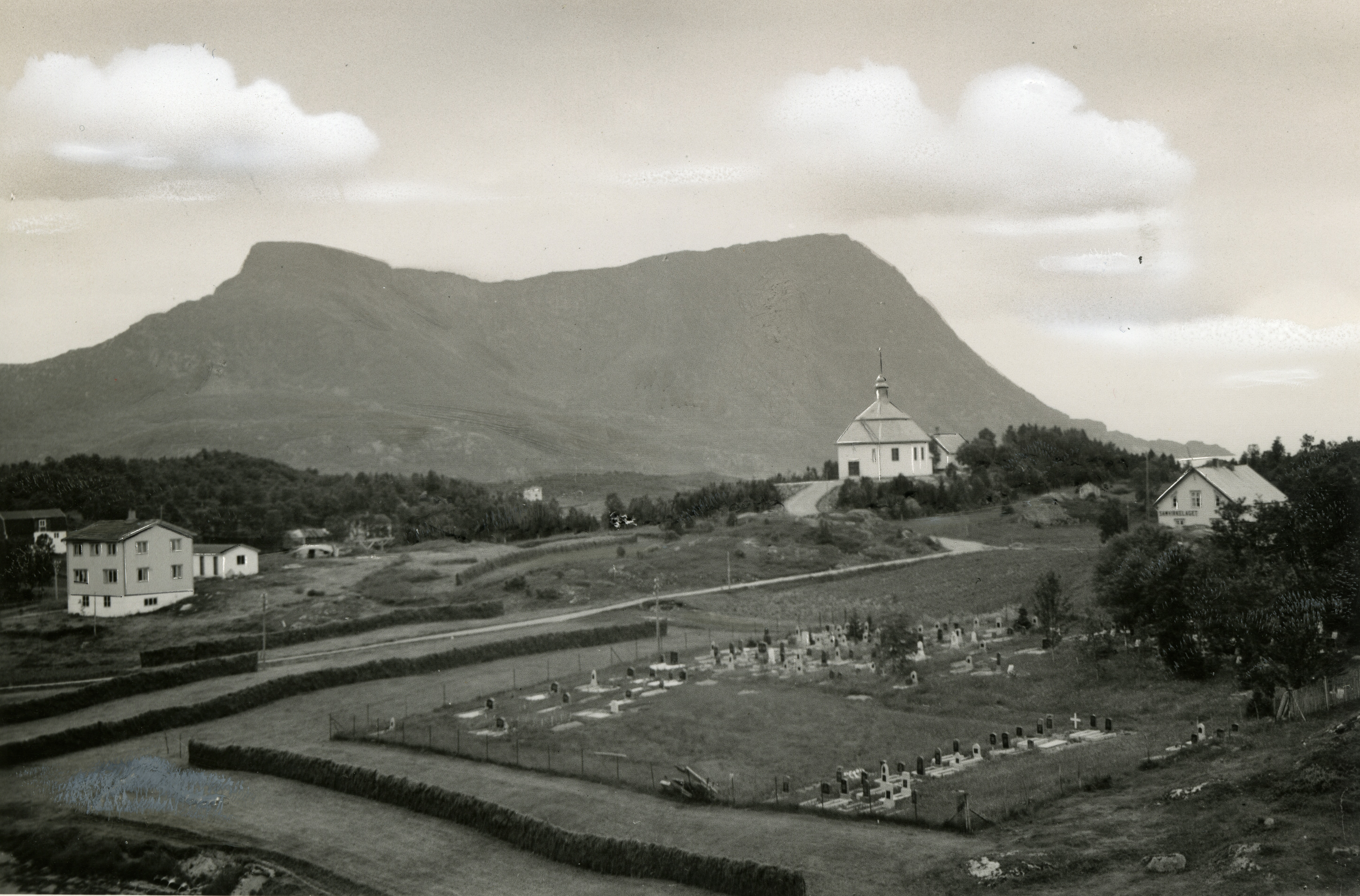
Digermulen Church

Digermulen Church (Norwegian: Digermulen kirke) is a parish church of the Church of Norway in Vågan Municipality in Nordland county, Norway. It is located in the village of Digermulen on the island of Hinnøya. It is one of the churches for the Svolvær parish which is part of the Lofoten prosti (deanery) in the Diocese of Sør-Hålogaland. The white, concrete church was built in an octagonal style in 1951 using plans drawn up by the architects Andreas Melchior Wiel Nygaard
and Torstein Schyberg. The church seats about 250 people.

== See also ==
- List of churches in Sør-Hålogaland
- Octagonal churches in Norway
