= Gimsøystraumen Bridge =

Gimsøystraumen Bridge Gimsøystraumen bru
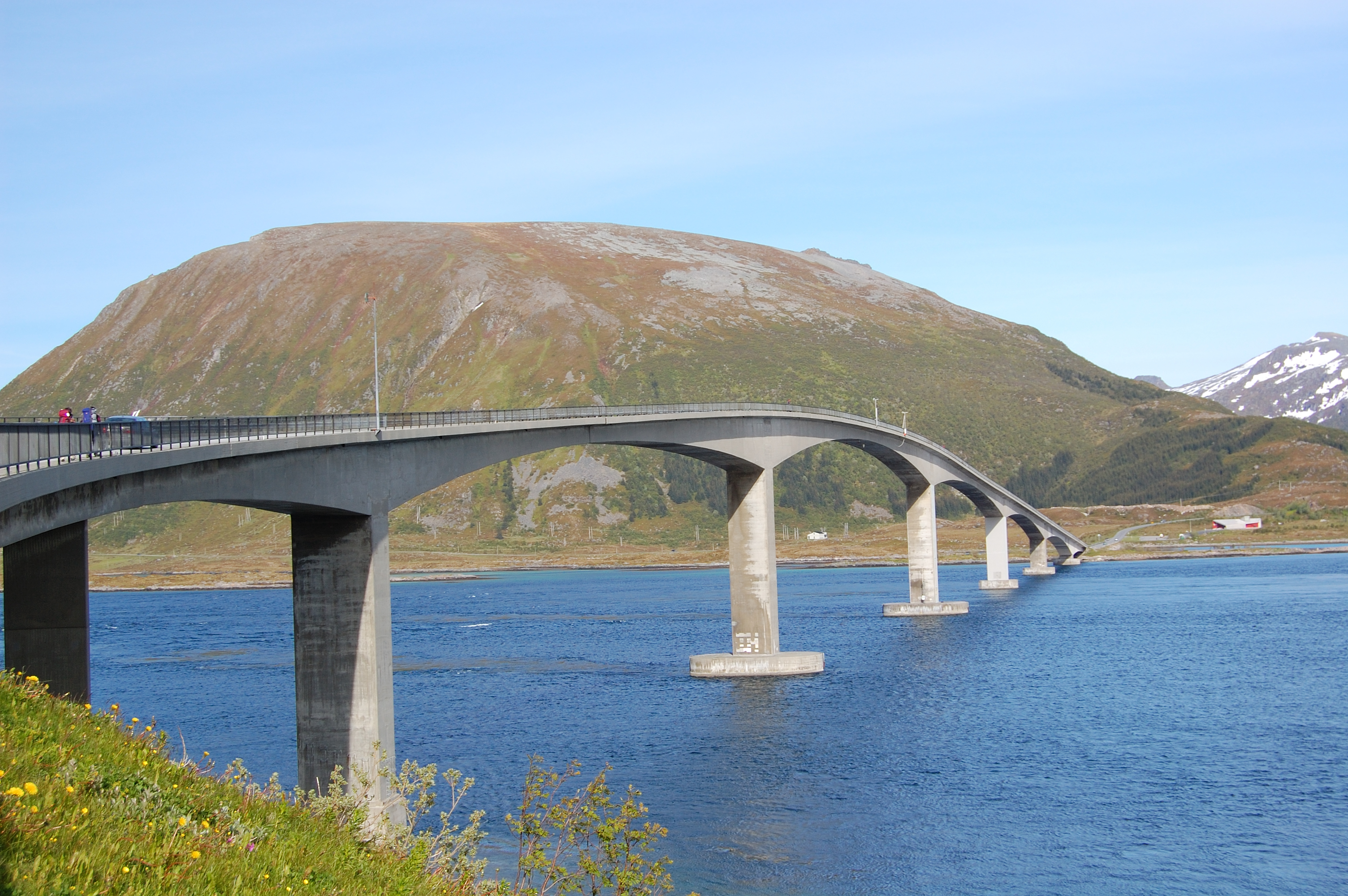
- View of the bridge
- Coordinates: 68°15′44″N 14°15′16″E
- Carries: E10
- Crosses: Gimsøystraumen
- Locale: Vågan, Norway
- Other name(s): Gimsøybrua

Characteristics
- Material: Concrete
- Total length: 839 metres (2,753 ft)
- Width: 8.7 metres (29 ft)
- Longest span: 148 metres (486 ft)
- Clearance below: 30 metres (98 ft)

History
- Construction start: 1979
- Construction cost: 43 million kr
- Opened: 1980

The Gimsøystraumen Bridge (Norwegian: Gimsøystraumen bru / Gimsøybrua) is a cantilever road bridge that crosses the Gimsøystraumen strait between the islands of Austvågøya and Gimsøya in Vågan Municipality in Nordland county, Norway.

The concrete bridge is 839 metres (2,753 ft) long, the main span is 148 metres (486 ft), and the maximum clearance to the sea is 30 metres (98 ft). The bridge has 9 spans. Gimsøystraumen Bridge was opened in 1980. It is one of many bridges that connect the islands of Lofoten to each other as part of the European route E10 highway.

== See also ==
- List of bridges in Norway
- List of bridges in Norway by length
- List of bridges
- List of bridges by length
