= Higravtindan =

Mountain in Nordland, Norway

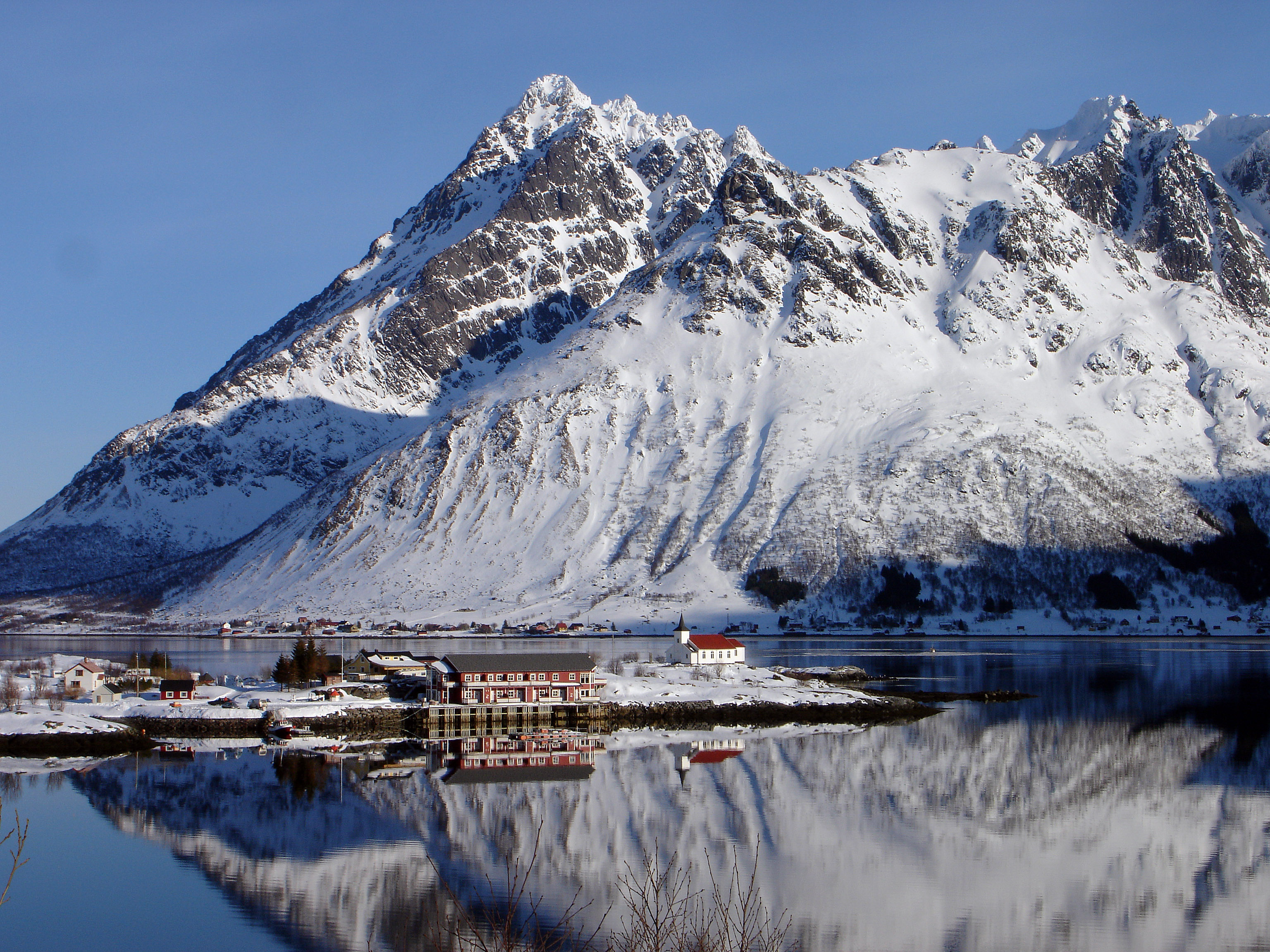

Highest point
- Elevation: 1,148 m (3,766 ft)
- Prominence: 1,148 m (3,766 ft)
- Isolation: 32.7 to 32.9 km (20.3 to 20.4 mi)
- Coordinates: 68.3570°N 14.7923°E

Geography
- Interactive map of the mountain
- Location: Nordland, Norway
- Topo map: N1131 I Austvågøya

Higravtindan is the tallest mountain on the island of Austvågøya in the Lofoten archipelago in Nordland county, Norway. It is located on the border of Hadsel Municipality and Vågan Municipality. The village of Laupstad and the European route E10 highway are located about 3 kilometres (1.9 mi) west of the mountain and the village of Liland is located about 3 kilometres (1.9 mi) southwest of the mountain. There is a glacier located on the east side of the mountain. The mountain is 1,148 m (3,766 ft) high.
