= Litlmolla =

Island in Nordland, Norway

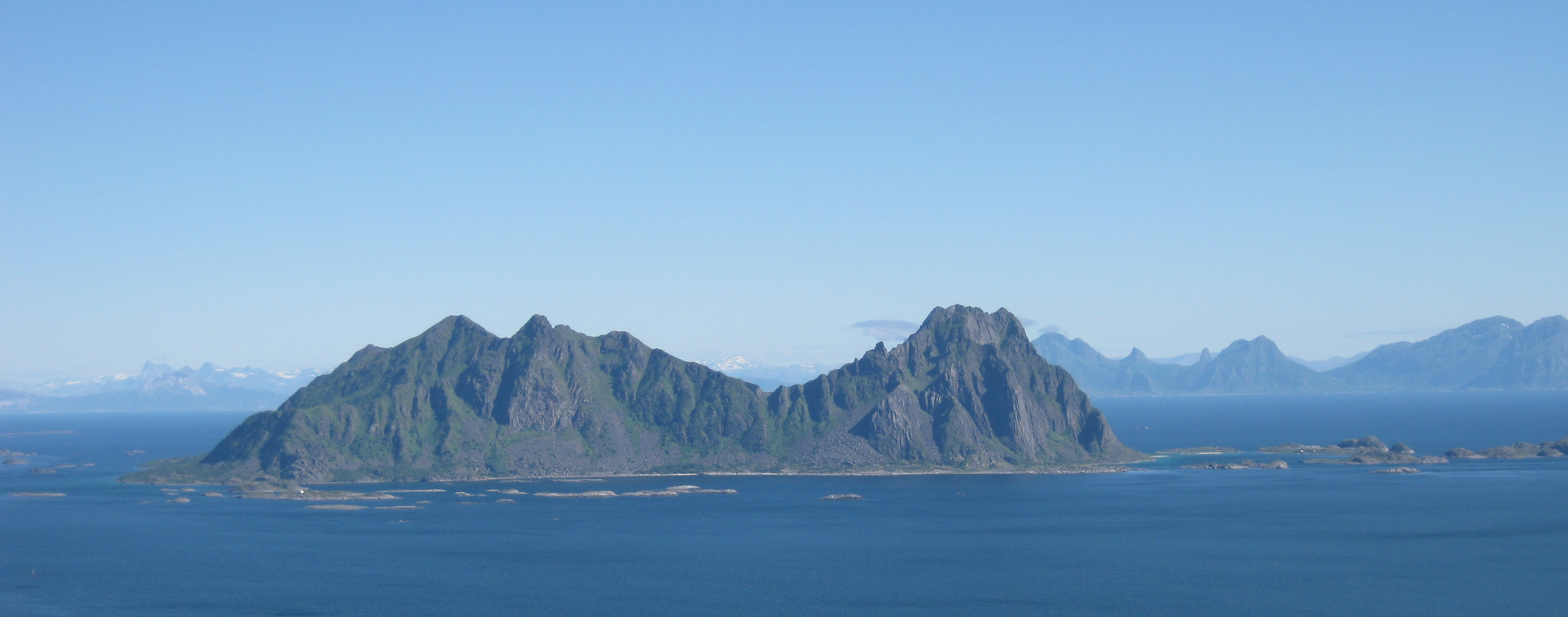
- View of Litlmolla, seen from near Svolvær
- Interactive map of Litlmolla

Geography
- Location: Nordland, Norway
- Coordinates: 68.1985°N 14.7484°E
- Archipelago: Lofoten
- Area: 9.7 km^{2} (3.7 sq mi)
- Length: 4 km (2.5 mi)
- Width: 3.6 km (2.24 mi)
- Highest elevation: 543 m (1781 ft)
- Highest point: Nonstinden

Administration
- Norway
- County: Nordland
- Municipality: Vågan Municipality

Demographics
- Population: 0 (2018)
- Pop. density: 0/km^{2} (0/sq mi)

Litlmolla is an uninhabited island in Vågan Municipality in Nordland county, Norway. The island lies southeast of the town of Svolvær in the Vestfjorden. The island is located in the Lofoten archipelago, south of the large island of Austvågøya, southwest of the island of Stormolla, and northeast of the small island of Skrova. The 10-square-kilometre (3.9 sq mi) island was formerly inhabited, but has long since been abandoned. The highest point on the island is the 543-metre (1,781 ft) tall Nonstinden.

== See also ==
- List of islands of Norway
