= Vågan Municipality =

Municipality in Nordland, Norway

Vågan Municipality Vågan kommune Vuogát (Northern Sami)
- Municipality
- Vaagan herred (historic name)
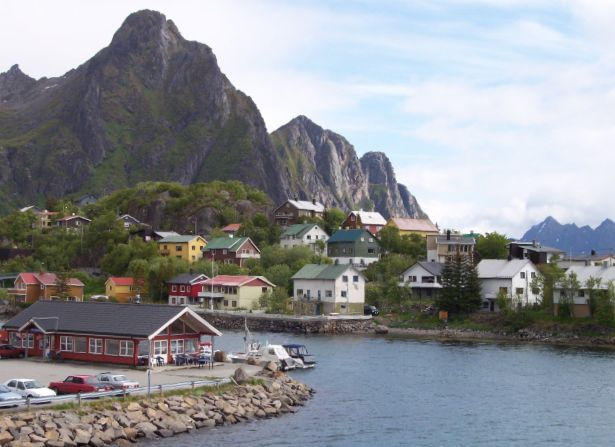

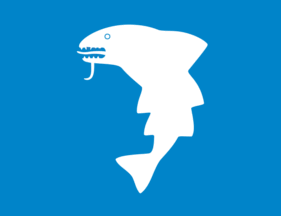
- Flag Coat of arms

- Nordland within Norway

- Vågan within Nordland
- Coordinates: 68°16′41″N 14°31′15″E
- Country: Norway
- County: Nordland
- District: Lofoten
- Established: 1 Jan 1838
  - Created as: Formannskapsdistrikt
- Administrative centre: Svolvær

Government
  - Mayor (2023): Vidar Thom Benjaminsen (H)

Area
  - Total: 479.18 km^{2} (185.01 sq mi)
  - Land: 459.97 km^{2} (177.60 sq mi)
  - Water: 19.21 km^{2} (7.42 sq mi) 4%
  - Rank: #209 in Norway
- Highest elevation: 1,138.32 m (3,734.6 ft)

Population (2024)
  - Total: 9,793
  - Rank: #117 in Norway
  - Density: 20.4/km^{2} (53/sq mi)
  - Change (10 years): ▲ +6.2%
- Demonym: Vågaværing

Official language
  - Norwegian form: Neutral
- Time zone: UTC+01:00 (CET)
  - Summer (DST): UTC+02:00 (CEST)
- ISO 3166 code: NO-1865
- Website: Official website

Vågan (Northern Sami: Vuogát) is a municipality in Nordland county, Norway. It is part of the traditional district of Lofoten. The administrative centre of the municipality is the town of Svolvær. Some of the villages in Vågan include Digermulen, Gimsøysand, Gravermarka, Henningsvær, Hopen, Kabelvåg, Kleppstad, Laupstad, Liland, Skrova, Straumnes, and Sydalen.

The 479-square-kilometre (185 sq mi) municipality is the 209th largest by area out of the 357 municipalities in Norway. Vågan Municipality is the 117th most populous municipality in Norway with a population of 9,793. The municipality's population density is 20.4 inhabitants per square kilometre (53/sq mi) and its population has increased by 6.2% over the previous 10-year period.

== General information ==
Vågan was established as a municipality on 1 January 1838 (see formannskapsdistrikt law). In 1856, the northwestern part of Vågan Municipality (population: 987) was separated to form the new Gimsøy Municipality. On 1 July 1918, the town of Svolvær (population: 2,429) was separated to form its own municipality. This left Vågan with 3,399 residents. During the 1960s, there were many municipal mergers across Norway due to the work of the Schei Committee. On 1 January 1964, Gimsøy Municipality (population: 1,551), the town of Svolvær (population: 3,952), and Vågan Municipality (population: 4,820) were merged to form the new, larger Vågan Municipality.

=== Name ===
The municipality (originally the parish) is named after the old Vågan farm (Old Norse: Vágar) since the first Vågan Church was built there. The name is the plural form of vágr which means "bay" or "inlet". The island of Austvågøya (Old Norse: Vágøy) was named after this important site too (which later led the neighboring island to be named Vestvågøya). On 21 December 1917, a royal resolution enacted the 1917 Norwegian language reforms. Prior to this change, the name was spelled Vaagan with the digraph "aa", and after this reform, the name was spelled Vågan, using the letter å instead.

=== Coat of arms ===
The coat of arms was granted on 30 March 1973. The official blazon is "Azure, a cod embowed argent" (Norwegian: På blå bunn en vertikalstillet fremadbøyd sølv torsk). This means the arms have a blue field (background) and the charge is a cod. The cod has a tincture of argent which means it is commonly colored white, but if it is made out of metal, then silver is used. The blue color in the field and the code were chosen because fishing is the main source of income for the municipality. The arms were designed by Hallvard Traetteberg, basing them off the old arms for the town of Svolvær which was merged into Vågan in 1964.

=== Churches ===
The Church of Norway has five parishes (sokn) within Vågan Municipality. It is part of the Lofoten prosti (deanery) in the Diocese of Sør-Hålogaland.

Churches in Vågan Municipality
Parish (sokn)	Church name	Location of the church	Year built
Gimsøy og Strauman	Gimsøy Church	Gimsøysand	1876
Gimsøy og Strauman	Strauman Church	Sydalen	1984
Henningsvær	Henningsvær Church	Henningsvær	1974
Strandlandet	Strandlandet Church	Straumnes	1938
Svolvær	Digermulen Church	Digermulen	1951
Svolvær	Sildpollnes Church	Sildpollneset	1891
Svolvær	Svolvær Church	Svolvær	1934
Vågan	Vågan Church	Kabelvåg	1898

== Geography ==
The main population centres are the town of Svolvær and the villages of Kabelvåg and Henningsvær, located on the largest island, Austvågøya (although Svolvær and Henningsvær are partly located on smaller islands adjacent to the main island). All three have a picturesque situation under the rugged Lofoten mountains, facing the rough body of water called Vestfjorden. Vågan municipality includes over half of Austvågøya island, all of the islands of Gimsøya, Skrova, Stormolla, Litlmolla, numerous other tiny islets, plus the southwestern tip of the island of Hinnøya. The Moholmen Lighthouse and Skrova Lighthouse are both located in the Vestfjorden. The highest point in the municipality is the 1,138.32-metre (3,734.6 ft) tall mountain Higravtindan. Other mountains include Svolværgeita, Fløya, Trakta, and Vågakallen.

=== Climate ===
Skrova near Svolvær has a temperate climate (marine west coast) in the 1991-2020 period.

Climate data for Skrova 1991-2020 (14 m, precipitation days 1961-90, extremes 1934-2025)
Month	Jan	Feb	Mar	Apr	May	Jun	Jul	Aug	Sep	Oct	Nov	Dec	Year
Record high °C (°F)	10.6 (51.1)	9.8 (49.6)	10 (50)	17.4 (63.3)	24.3 (75.7)	30.4 (86.7)	29.8 (85.6)	27.7 (81.9)	22.1 (71.8)	17.1 (62.8)	13 (55)	11.2 (52.2)	30.4 (86.7)
Mean daily maximum °C (°F)	2.4 (36.3)	1.6 (34.9)	2.2 (36.0)	4.8 (40.6)	9 (48)	13 (55)	16.1 (61.0)	15.4 (59.7)	12 (54)	7.8 (46.0)	5.4 (41.7)	3.6 (38.5)	7.8 (46.0)
Daily mean °C (°F)	0.9 (33.6)	0.2 (32.4)	0.7 (33.3)	3.1 (37.6)	6.8 (44.2)	10.6 (51.1)	13.6 (56.5)	13.3 (55.9)	10.4 (50.7)	6.5 (43.7)	4 (39)	2.2 (36.0)	6.0 (42.8)
Mean daily minimum °C (°F)	−1 (30)	−1.6 (29.1)	−0.9 (30.4)	1.4 (34.5)	4.9 (40.8)	8.6 (47.5)	11.5 (52.7)	11.5 (52.7)	8.8 (47.8)	4.9 (40.8)	2.2 (36.0)	0.3 (32.5)	4.2 (39.6)
Record low °C (°F)	−12.7 (9.1)	−15.1 (4.8)	−12.3 (9.9)	−8.5 (16.7)	−3.4 (25.9)	−1.2 (29.8)	3.7 (38.7)	3.9 (39.0)	−1.4 (29.5)	−4.5 (23.9)	−10.7 (12.7)	−11.9 (10.6)	−15.1 (4.8)
Average precipitation mm (inches)	89 (3.5)	81 (3.2)	65 (2.6)	49 (1.9)	46 (1.8)	37 (1.5)	50 (2.0)	48 (1.9)	79 (3.1)	88 (3.5)	97 (3.8)	90 (3.5)	819 (32.3)
Average precipitation days (≥ 1.0 mm)	14	11	11	10	9	9	11	10	15	17	15	15	147
Source 1: Norwegian Meteorological Institute
Source 2: Noaa WMO averages 91-2020 Norway

Climate data for Svolvær, Vågan 1991–2020 (precipitation from 1961-1990)
Month	Jan	Feb	Mar	Apr	May	Jun	Jul	Aug	Sep	Oct	Nov	Dec	Year
Daily mean °C (°F)	0.3 (32.5)	−0.4 (31.3)	0.3 (32.5)	2.7 (36.9)	6.6 (43.9)	10.1 (50.2)	13.3 (55.9)	12.7 (54.9)	9.8 (49.6)	5.6 (42.1)	3.3 (37.9)	1.5 (34.7)	5.5 (41.9)
Average precipitation mm (inches)	159 (6.3)	134 (5.3)	112 (4.4)	88 (3.5)	63 (2.5)	67 (2.6)	87 (3.4)	94 (3.7)	146 (5.7)	210 (8.3)	160 (6.3)	180 (7.1)	1,500 (59.1)
Source 1: Norwegian Meteorological Institute
Source 2: yr.no

== Government ==
Vågan Municipality is responsible for primary education (through 10th grade), outpatient health services, senior citizen services, welfare and other social services, zoning, economic development, and municipal roads and utilities. The municipality is governed by a municipal council of directly elected representatives. The mayor is indirectly elected by a vote of the municipal council. The municipality is under the jurisdiction of the Salten og Lofoten District Court and the Hålogaland Court of Appeal.

=== Municipal council ===
The municipal council (Kommunestyre) of Vågan Municipality is made up of 29 representatives that are elected to four year terms. The tables below show the current and historical composition of the council by political party.

Vågan kommunestyre 2023–2027
Party name (in Norwegian)	Number of representatives
Labour Party (Arbeiderpartiet)	5
Progress Party (Fremskrittspartiet)	3
Green Party (Miljøpartiet De Grønne)	1
Conservative Party (Høyre)	9
Red Party (Rødt)	2
Centre Party (Senterpartiet)	4
Socialist Left Party (Sosialistisk Venstreparti)	3
Liberal Party (Venstre)	2
Total number of members:	29

Vågan kommunestyre 2019–2023
Party name (in Norwegian)	Number of representatives
Labour Party (Arbeiderpartiet)	7
Progress Party (Fremskrittspartiet)	1
Green Party (Miljøpartiet De Grønne)	1
Conservative Party (Høyre)	9
Red Party (Rødt)	2
Centre Party (Senterpartiet)	4
Socialist Left Party (Sosialistisk Venstreparti)	3
Liberal Party (Venstre)	2
Total number of members:	29

Vågan kommunestyre 2015–2019
Party name (in Norwegian)	Number of representatives
Labour Party (Arbeiderpartiet)	8
Progress Party (Fremskrittspartiet)	2
Conservative Party (Høyre)	9
Red Party (Rødt)	3
Centre Party (Senterpartiet)	3
Socialist Left Party (Sosialistisk Venstreparti)	1
Liberal Party (Venstre)	3
Total number of members:	29

Vågan kommunestyre 2011–2015
Party name (in Norwegian)	Number of representatives
Labour Party (Arbeiderpartiet)	12
Progress Party (Fremskrittspartiet)	3
Conservative Party (Høyre)	11
Red Party (Rødt)	2
Centre Party (Senterpartiet)	3
Socialist Left Party (Sosialistisk Venstreparti)	2
Liberal Party (Venstre)	2
Total number of members:	35

Vågan kommunestyre 2007–2011
Party name (in Norwegian)	Number of representatives
Labour Party (Arbeiderpartiet)	12
Progress Party (Fremskrittspartiet)	5
Conservative Party (Høyre)	7
Christian Democratic Party (Kristelig Folkeparti)	1
Coastal Party (Kystpartiet)	1
Red Electoral Alliance (Rød Valgallianse)	3
Centre Party (Senterpartiet)	3
Socialist Left Party (Sosialistisk Venstreparti)	2
Liberal Party (Venstre)	1
Total number of members:	35

Vågan kommunestyre 2003–2007
Party name (in Norwegian)	Number of representatives
Labour Party (Arbeiderpartiet)	10
Progress Party (Fremskrittspartiet)	5
Conservative Party (Høyre)	4
Christian Democratic Party (Kristelig Folkeparti)	1
Coastal Party (Kystpartiet)	4
Red Electoral Alliance (Rød Valgallianse)	3
Centre Party (Senterpartiet)	3
Socialist Left Party (Sosialistisk Venstreparti)	5
Total number of members:	35

Vågan kommunestyre 1999–2003
Party name (in Norwegian)	Number of representatives
Labour Party (Arbeiderpartiet)	9
Progress Party (Fremskrittspartiet)	3
Conservative Party (Høyre)	7
Christian Democratic Party (Kristelig Folkeparti)	1
Coastal Party (Kystpartiet)	3
Red Electoral Alliance (Rød Valgallianse)	5
Centre Party (Senterpartiet)	6
Vågan women's list (Vågan kvinneliste)	1
Total number of members:	35

Vågan kommunestyre 1995–1999
Party name (in Norwegian)	Number of representatives
Labour Party (Arbeiderpartiet)	14
Conservative Party (Høyre)	7
Christian Democratic Party (Kristelig Folkeparti)	1
Red Electoral Alliance (Rød Valgallianse)	2
Centre Party (Senterpartiet)	6
Socialist Left Party (Sosialistisk Venstreparti)	3
Liberal Party (Venstre)	2
Total number of members:	35

Vågan kommunestyre 1991–1995
Party name (in Norwegian)	Number of representatives
Labour Party (Arbeiderpartiet)	20
Progress Party (Fremskrittspartiet)	1
Conservative Party (Høyre)	8
Christian Democratic Party (Kristelig Folkeparti)	1
Red Electoral Alliance (Rød Valgallianse)	2
Centre Party (Senterpartiet)	5
Socialist Left Party (Sosialistisk Venstreparti)	7
Liberal Party (Venstre)	1
Total number of members:	45

Vågan kommunestyre 1987–1991
Party name (in Norwegian)	Number of representatives
Labour Party (Arbeiderpartiet)	20
Progress Party (Fremskrittspartiet)	3
Conservative Party (Høyre)	12
Christian Democratic Party (Kristelig Folkeparti)	1
Red Electoral Alliance (Rød Valgallianse)	1
Centre Party (Senterpartiet)	2
Socialist Left Party (Sosialistisk Venstreparti)	4
Liberal Party (Venstre)	2
Total number of members:	45

Vågan kommunestyre 1983–1987
Party name (in Norwegian)	Number of representatives
Labour Party (Arbeiderpartiet)	20
Progress Party (Fremskrittspartiet)	1
Conservative Party (Høyre)	14
Christian Democratic Party (Kristelig Folkeparti)	2
Centre Party (Senterpartiet)	3
Socialist Left Party (Sosialistisk Venstreparti)	3
Liberal Party (Venstre)	2
Total number of members:	45

Vågan kommunestyre 1979–1983
Party name (in Norwegian)	Number of representatives
Labour Party (Arbeiderpartiet)	16
Conservative Party (Høyre)	15
Christian Democratic Party (Kristelig Folkeparti)	3
Red Electoral Alliance (Rød Valgallianse)	1
Centre Party (Senterpartiet)	4
Socialist Left Party (Sosialistisk Venstreparti)	2
Liberal Party (Venstre)	2
Vågan non-party list (Vågan upolitiske liste)	2
Total number of members:	45

Vågan kommunestyre 1975–1979
Party name (in Norwegian)	Number of representatives
Labour Party (Arbeiderpartiet)	18
Conservative Party (Høyre)	9
Christian Democratic Party (Kristelig Folkeparti)	3
Centre Party (Senterpartiet)	8
Socialist Left Party (Sosialistisk Venstreparti)	3
Liberal Party (Venstre)	3
Svolvær Free Voters (Svolvær Frie Velgere)	1
Total number of members:	45

Vågan kommunestyre 1971–1975
Party name (in Norwegian)	Number of representatives
Labour Party (Arbeiderpartiet)	22
Conservative Party (Høyre)	6
Christian Democratic Party (Kristelig Folkeparti)	2
Centre Party (Senterpartiet)	6
Liberal Party (Venstre)	3
Local List(s) (Lokale lister)	6
Total number of members:	45

Vågan kommunestyre 1967–1971
Party name (in Norwegian)	Number of representatives
Labour Party (Arbeiderpartiet)	24
Conservative Party (Høyre)	9
Christian Democratic Party (Kristelig Folkeparti)	2
Centre Party (Senterpartiet)	4
Socialist People's Party (Sosialistisk Folkeparti)	2
Liberal Party (Venstre)	5
Local List(s) (Lokale lister)	7
Total number of members:	53

Vågan kommunestyre 1963–1967
Party name (in Norwegian)	Number of representatives
Labour Party (Arbeiderpartiet)	25
Conservative Party (Høyre)	10
Christian Democratic Party (Kristelig Folkeparti)	2
Liberal Party (Venstre)	8
Local List(s) (Lokale lister)	8
Total number of members:	53
Note: On 1 January 1964, Gimsøy Municipality and the town of Svolvær became part of Vågan Municipality.

Vågan herredsstyre 1959–1963
Party name (in Norwegian)	Number of representatives
Labour Party (Arbeiderpartiet)	11
Conservative Party (Høyre)	6
Liberal Party (Venstre)	5
Local List(s) (Lokale lister)	3
Total number of members:	25

Vågan herredsstyre 1955–1959
Party name (in Norwegian)	Number of representatives
Labour Party (Arbeiderpartiet)	11
Communist Party (Kommunistiske Parti)	1
Liberal Party (Venstre)	7
Joint List(s) of Non-Socialist Parties (Borgerlige Felleslister)	5
Local List(s) (Lokale lister)	1
Total number of members:	25

Vågan herredsstyre 1951–1955
Party name (in Norwegian)	Number of representatives
Labour Party (Arbeiderpartiet)	7
Conservative Party (Høyre)	2
Liberal Party (Venstre)	5
Local List(s) (Lokale lister)	6
Total number of members:	20

Vågan herredsstyre 1947–1951
Party name (in Norwegian)	Number of representatives
Labour Party (Arbeiderpartiet)	8
Communist Party (Kommunistiske Parti)	1
Christian Democratic Party (Kristelig Folkeparti)	1
Joint list of the Liberal Party (Venstre) and the Radical People's Party (Radikale Folkepartiet)	2
Joint List(s) of Non-Socialist Parties (Borgerlige Felleslister)	5
Local List(s) (Lokale lister)	3
Total number of members:	20

Vågan herredsstyre 1945–1947
Party name (in Norwegian)	Number of representatives
Labour Party (Arbeiderpartiet)	9
Communist Party (Kommunistiske Parti)	2
Christian Democratic Party (Kristelig Folkeparti)	1
Joint list of the Liberal Party (Venstre) and the Radical People's Party (Radikale Folkepartiet)	1
Joint List(s) of Non-Socialist Parties (Borgerlige Felleslister)	4
Local List(s) (Lokale lister)	3
Total number of members:	20

Vågan herredsstyre 1937–1941*
Party name (in Norwegian)	Number of representatives
Labour Party (Arbeiderpartiet)	8
List of workers, fishermen, and small farmholders (Arbeidere, fiskere, småbrukere liste)	1
Local List(s) (Lokale lister)	11
Total number of members:	20
Note: Due to the German occupation of Norway during World War II, no elections were held for new municipal councils until after the war ended in 1945.

=== Mayors ===
The mayor (Norwegian: ordfører) of Vågan Municipality is the political leader of the municipality and the chairperson of the municipal council. Here is a list of people who have held this position:

- 1838–1839: Bjørn Ursin Rist
- 1840–1843: S.L. Hansen
- 1844–1846: Jens Hasselberg
- 1846–1850: Georg Ludvig Størmer
- 1850–1852: W.C. Schmidt
- 1852–1856: Marcus Normann
- 1857–1860: Johan Peter Bordewich
- 1861–1864: Peder Rohde Simonsen
- 1864–1868: Christoffer Ellingsen
- 1868–1872: John Steen
- 1873–1876: Christoffer Ellingsen
- 1877–1880: Christian Eger
- 1881–1888: Andreas M. Hansen (V)
- 1889–1894: Ole Johan Kaarbø (H)
- 1895–1898: Martin Kvam
- 1899–1904: Peder Schønning
- 1905–1910: Erik Lund (H)
- 1911–1913: Jonas Pedersen (V)
- 1914–1914: Anton K. Meyer (V)
- 1915–1919: Eyvind Borgen (H)
- 1920–1922: Hilmar Christensen
- 1923–1925: Emil Henriksen (V)
- 1926–1931: B. Knaplund
- 1932–1942: Julius Høy (V)
- 1942–1944: David Eilertsen (NS)
- 1944–1945: Henrik Grønhaug (NS)
- 1945–1945: Halvdan Fjelldal (V)
- 1945–1955: Birger Benjaminsen (Ap)
- 1956–1965: Egil Wiik (V)
- 1966–1967: Torleif Reinholdtsen (Ap)
- 1968–1975: Egil Schumacher (Ap)
- 1976–1977: Thor Wikan (H)
- 1978–1979: Egil Reiertsen (Ap)
- 1980–1983: Thor Wikan (H)
- 1983–1995: Steinar Molvik (Ap)
- 1995–1999: Harald E. Hansen (Sp)
- 1999–2011: Hugo Bjørnstad (Ap)
- 2011–2019: Eivind Holst (H)
- 2019–2023: Frank Johnsen (Sp)
- 2023–present: Vidar Thom Benjaminsen (H)

== History and economy ==
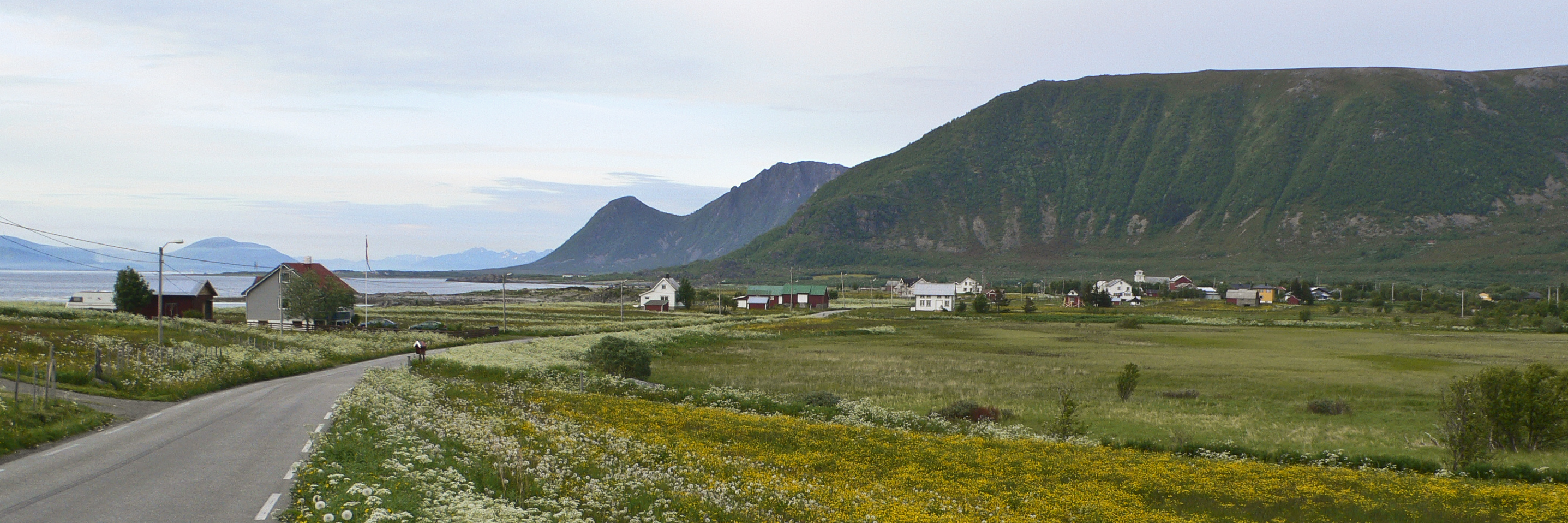
Landscape in northern Vågan, outskirts of Laukvik.

Kabelvåg is the oldest fishing village in Lofoten, where King Øystein built the first fishing shacks in the early 12th century. The Lofoten Cathedral, built in 1898, seats 1,200 people, and used to be filled to the last seat during the Lofoten fishing in the winter.

Henningsvær has a picturesque situation on several islands, and is today more important for fishing. Svolvær is the municipal centre, and has an impressive number of artists' studios and galleries. In addition to the cod fisheries, salmon fish farming and tourism are economically important in Vågan.

== Transportation ==
The islands that make up Vågan are connected by several different bridges. The European route E10 highway connects the neighboring Vestvågøy Municipality to Vågan Municipality (Gimsøya island) by the Sundklakkstraumen Bridge. Gimsøya island then connects to Austvågøya island by the Gimsøystraumen Bridge. The islands of Henningsvær are connected to Austvågøya by the Henningsvær Bridges. The rest of the small islands are only accessible by boats and ferries. In the town of Svolvær, the Svinøy Bridge connects the main part of town to the island of Svinøya. Svolvær Airport, Helle is located just east of the town of Svolvær.

== Sister cities ==
- Ancona, Italy

== Notable people ==
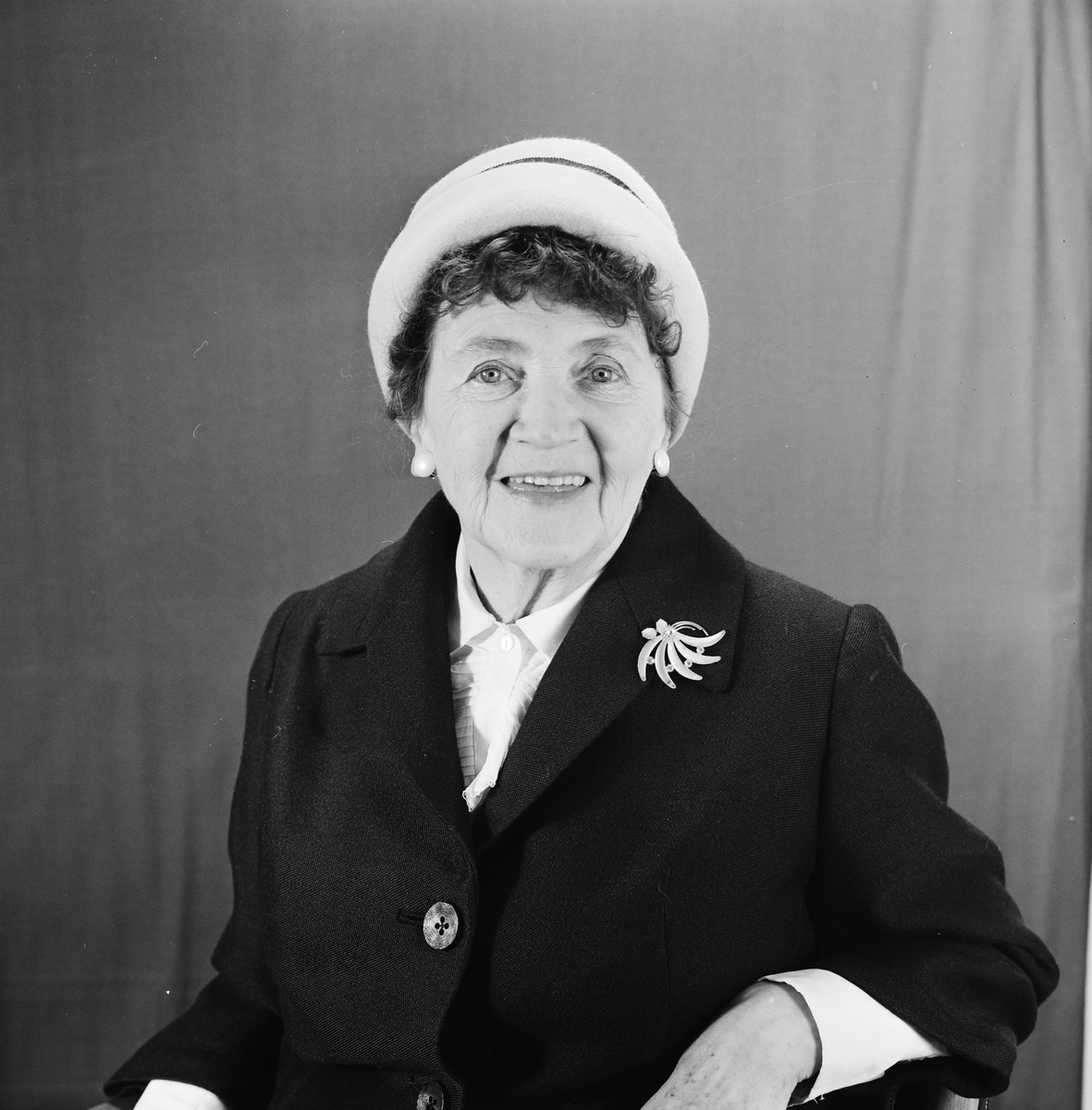
Gisken Wildenwey, 1964

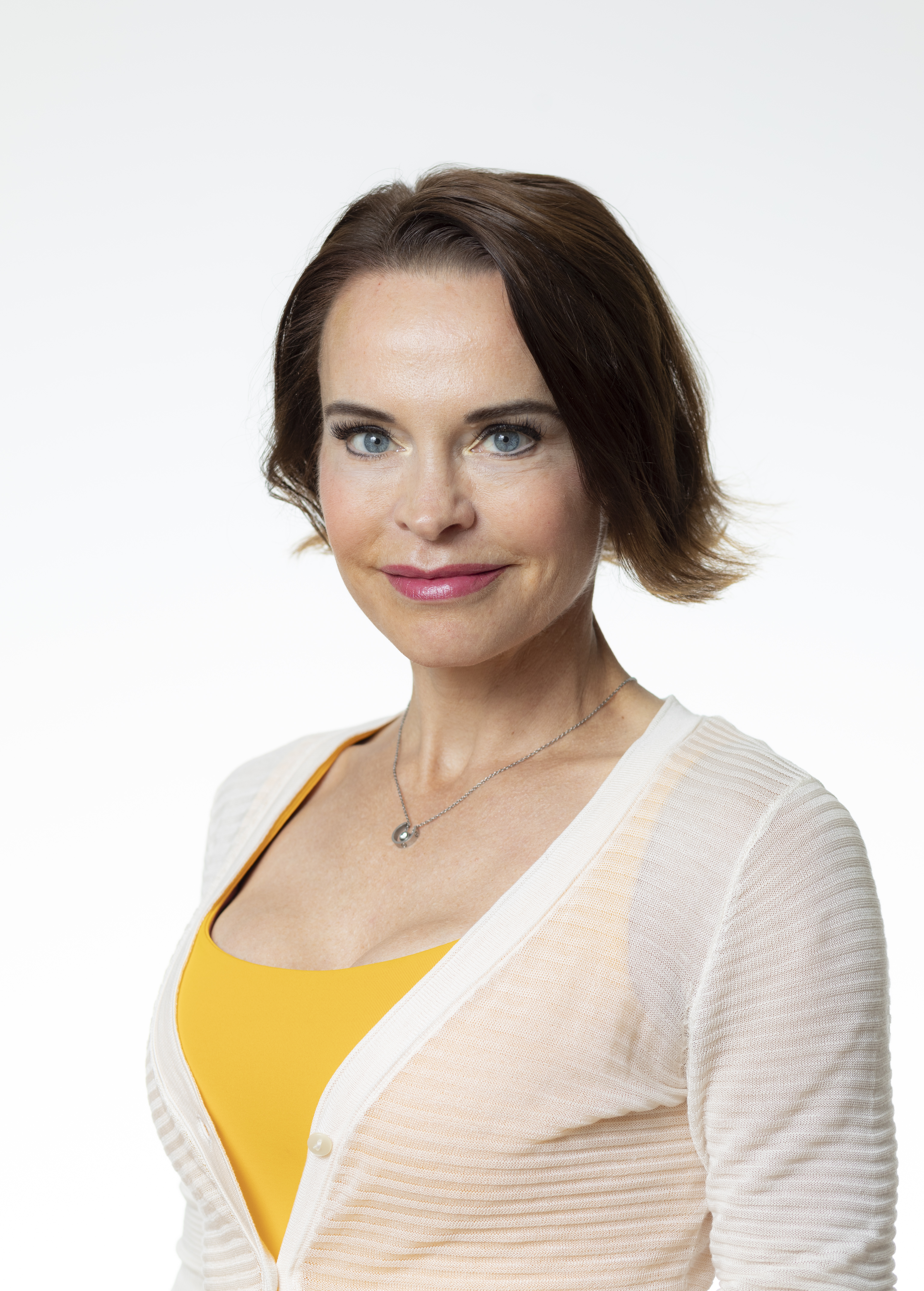
Maria Strømme, 2020

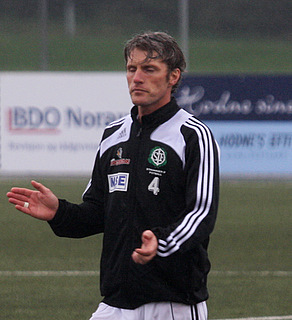
Cato André Hansen, 2009

- Eystein I of Norway (ca.1088–1123), the King of Norway from 1103 to 1123, who founded the settlement of Vågan
- Paul Egede (1708 in Kabelvåg – 1789), a Dano-Norwegian theologian, scholar, and Lutheran missionionary to the Kalaallit people in Greenland
- Niels Rasch Egede (1710 in Vågan – 1782), a Danish-Norwegian merchant and Lutheran missionary in Greenland
- Gunnar Berg (1863 on Svinøya – 1893), a painter who painted the everyday life of local fishermen in Lofoten
- Martin Hoff Ekroll (1865 in Skroven – 1916), a merchant, mountaineer, and Arctic explorer
- Erna Schøyen (born 1887 in Kabelvåg – 1968), a Norwegian actress
- Gisken Wildenvey (1892 at Austvågøy – 1985), a novelist and author of short stories
- Soffi Schønning (1895 in Kabelvåg – 1994), a Norwegian operatic soprano
- Ellen Einan (1931 in Svolvær – 2013), a Norwegian poet and illustrator
- Dagfinn Bakke (1933–2019 in Svolvær), a Norwegian painter, illustrator, and printmaker
- Hans Christian Alsvik (1936 in Svolvær – 2011), a Norwegian television presenter
- Jack Berntsen (1940–2010), a philologist, songwriter, and folk singer; lived in Svolvær from 1968
- Inger Johanne Grytting (born 1949 in Svolvær), an artist, lives and works in New York City
- Maryon Eilertsen (1950 in Svolvær – 2015), a Norwegian actress and theatre director
- Kari Bremnes (born 1956 in Svolvær), a Norwegian singer and songwriter
- Marit Andreassen (born 1966 in Svolvær), a Norwegian actress
- Maria Strømme (born 1970 in Svolvær) a physicist and academic who lives and works in Sweden

=== Sport ===
- Terje Hanssen (born 1948 in Kabelvåg), a former biathlete who competed at the 1976 Winter Olympics
- Ørjan Løvdal (born 1962 in Svolvær), a Norwegian ice hockey player and coach
- Cato André Hansen (born 1972 in Strauman), a football coach and former player with 234 caps for FK Bodø/Glimt
- Stig Johansen (born 1972 in Kabelvåg), a former footballer with 305 club caps and 3 for Norway

== Gallery ==
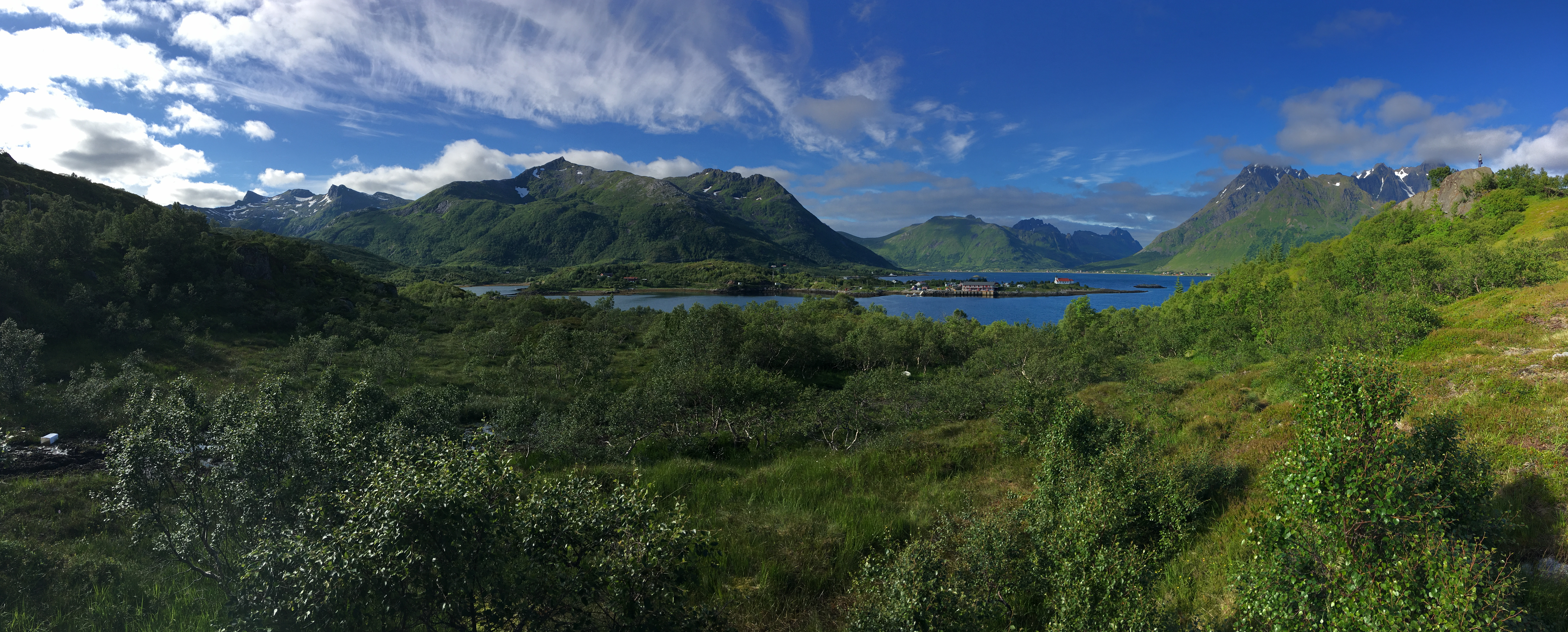
Austnesfjorden

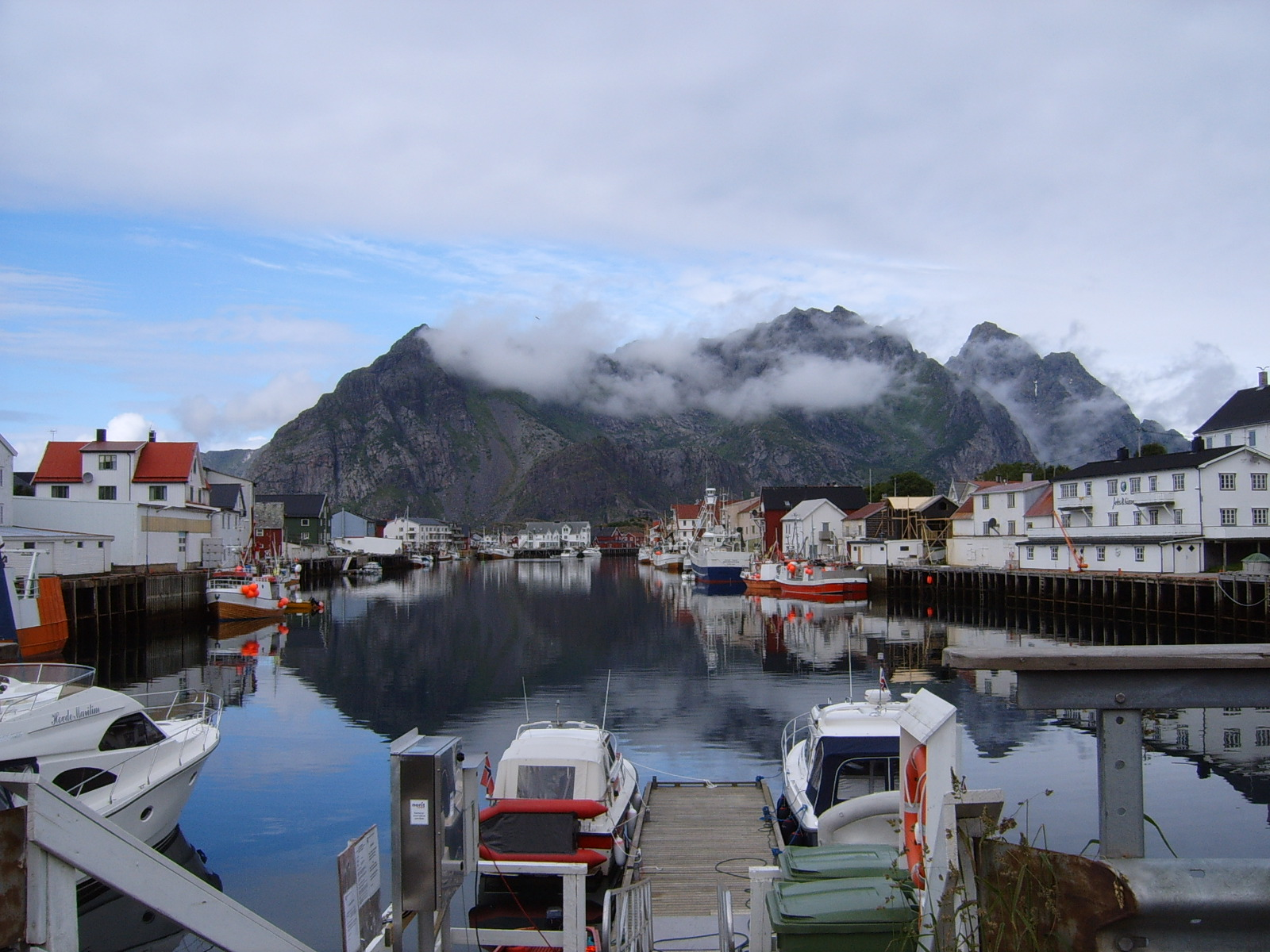
Henningsvær.

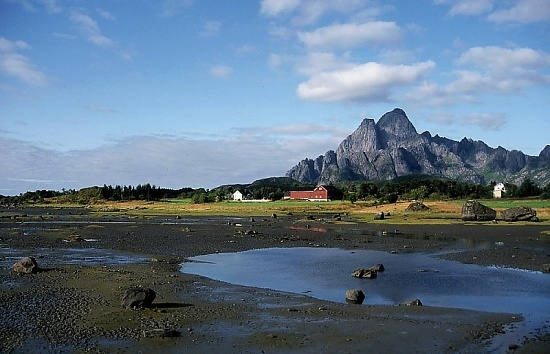
Vågakallen towers over Henningsvær, seen from Kabelvåg.

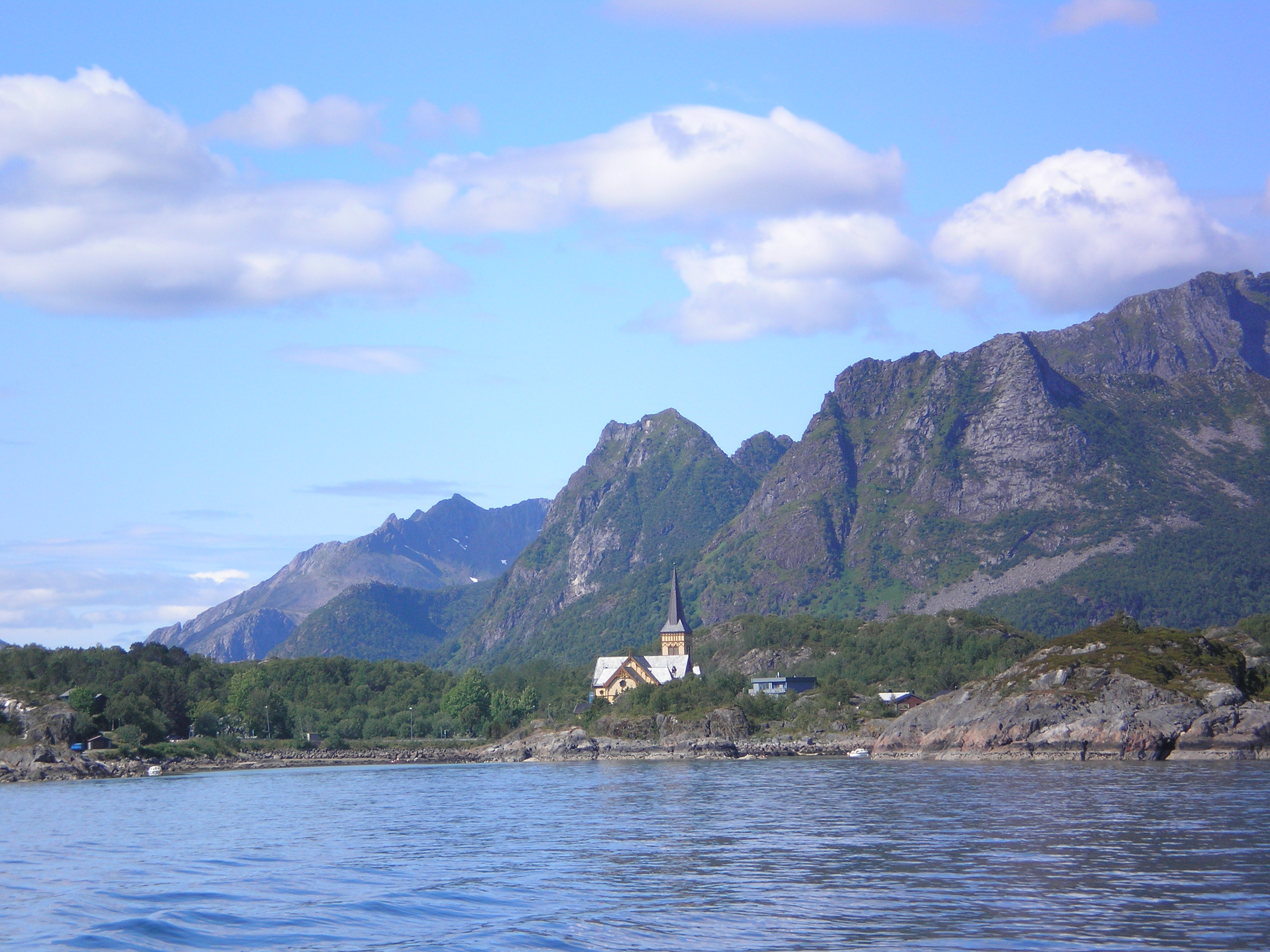
Kabelvåg landscape with the Vågan Church; early June 2009.
