= Austvågøya =

Island in Nordland, Norway

Austvågøya Aust-Vågøy
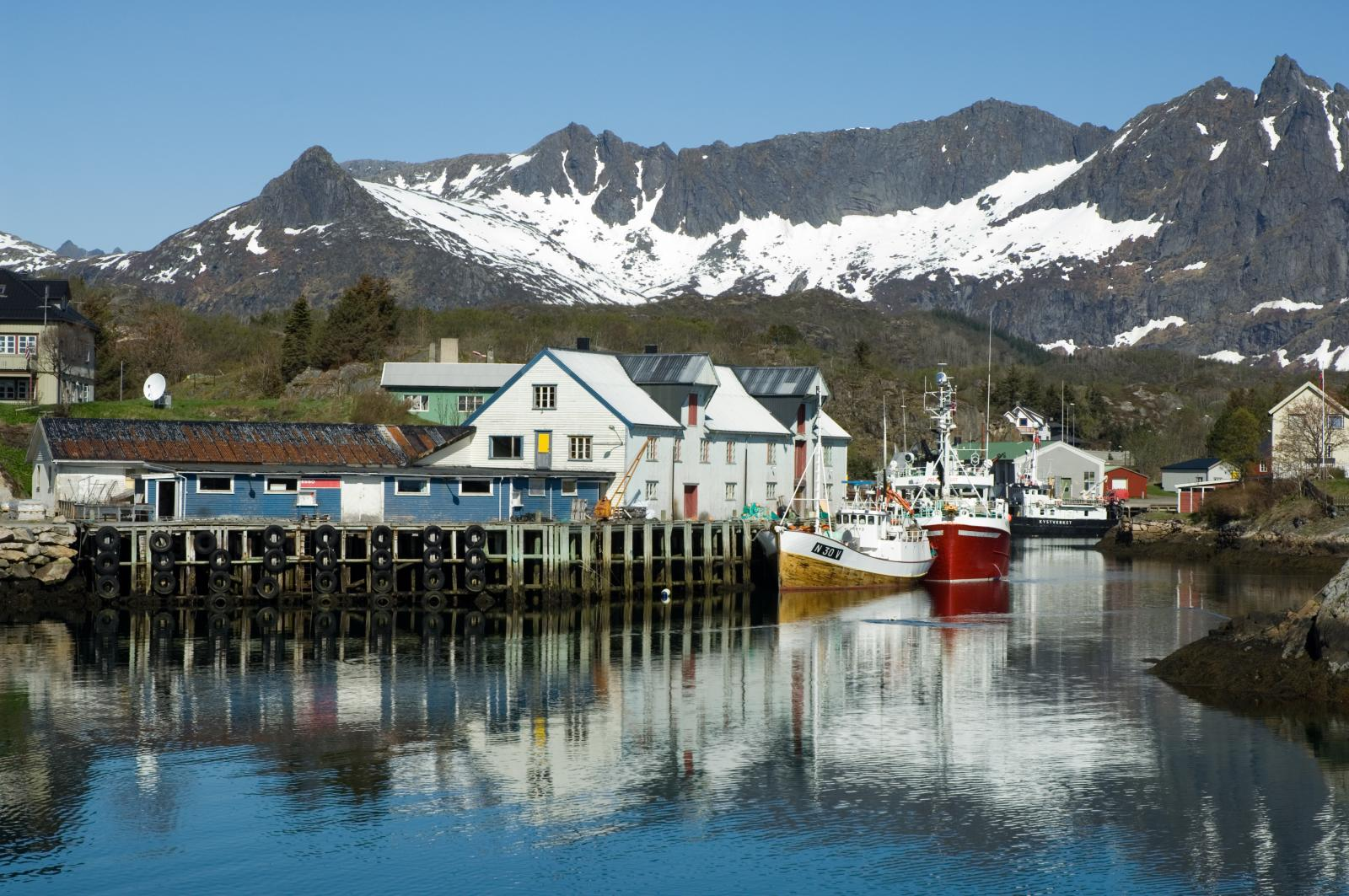
- Interactive map of Austvågøya; Aust-Vågøy

Geography
- Location: Nordland, Norway
- Coordinates: 68.2447°N 14.4882°E
- Archipelago: Lofoten
- Area: 526.7 km^{2} (203.4 sq mi)
- Length: 40 km (25 mi)
- Width: 30 km (19 mi)
- Highest elevation: 1,146 m (3760 ft)
- Highest point: Higravtindan

Administration
- Norway
- County: Nordland
- Municipalities: Vågan and Hadsel

Demographics
- Population: 9,264 (2017)
- Pop. density: 17.6/km^{2} (45.6/sq mi)

Austvågøya is the northeasternmost and largest of the larger islands in the Lofoten archipelago in Nordland county, Norway. It is located between the Vestfjorden and the Norwegian Sea. The island of Vestvågøya lies to the southwest and the large island of Hinnøya to the northeast. In 2017, the island had about 9,000 residents.

Most of the island is part of Vågan Municipality, while the northeastern part belongs to Hadsel Municipality. The main town on the island is Svolvær. Austvågøya is popular among mountain climbers. The famous Trollfjord is located in the eastern part of the island. Austvågøya is connected by the European route E10 highway to the neighboring island of Hinnøya to the east using the Raftsund Bridge and to the island of Gimsøya to the west using the Gimsøystraumen Bridge.

== Geography ==
The 526.7-square-kilometre (203.4 sq mi) island is 40 kilometres (25 mi) long in the east to west direction and 30 kilometres (19 mi) wide from the north to south. The islands surrounding Austvågøya include Gimsøya and Vestvågøya to the west, Skrova, Litlmolla, and Stormolla to the south, Hinnøya to the east, and Hadseløya to the north.

Austvågøya is largely a mountain massif, with lowland almost exclusively at the coastal beaches, the brim of lowland around the coast. The highest mountain on the island (and in all of Lofoten) is the 1,146-metre (3,760 ft) tall Higravstinden, located on the eastern part of the island. Svartsundtindan (1,050 metres or 3,440 feet), Trolltindan (1,045 metres or 3,428 feet), and Olsanestind (1,000 metres or 3,300 feet) are also in the eastern part, while the famous Vågakallen (942 metres or 3,091 feet) looms over the village of Henningsvær in the southwestern part.

== Name ==
The island is named Austvågøya which comes from the Old Norse form of the name: Vágøy. The prefix aust (which means "east") was added more recently to differentiate it from the neighboring island of Vestvågøya. The old name of the island comes from the local farm area where the historic Vågan Church is located. The first element of the name comes from the Old Norse word vágr which means "inlet" or "bay". The last element is øy which means "island".

== Media gallery ==
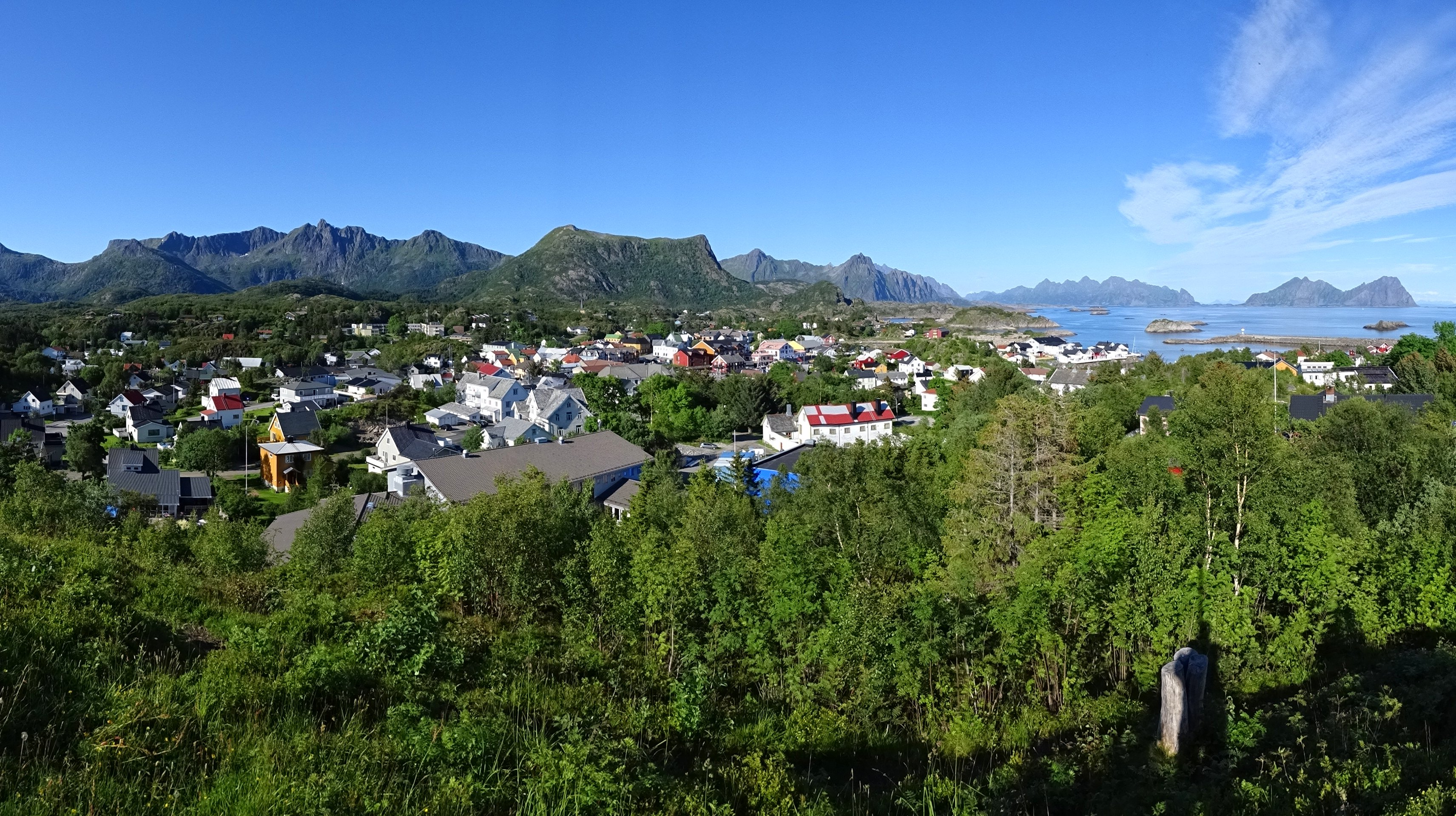
Kabelvåg on Austvågøy

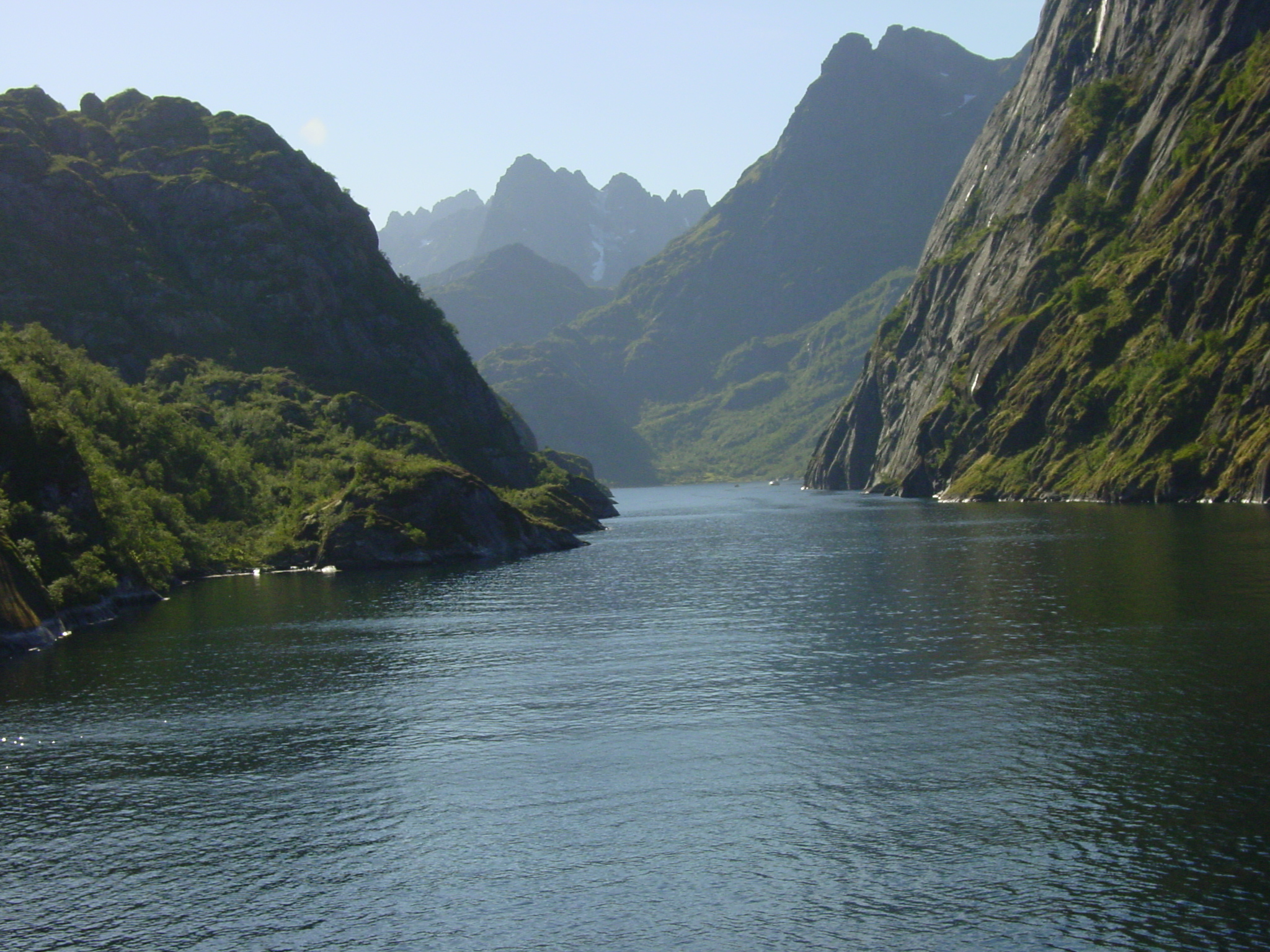
Trollfjord

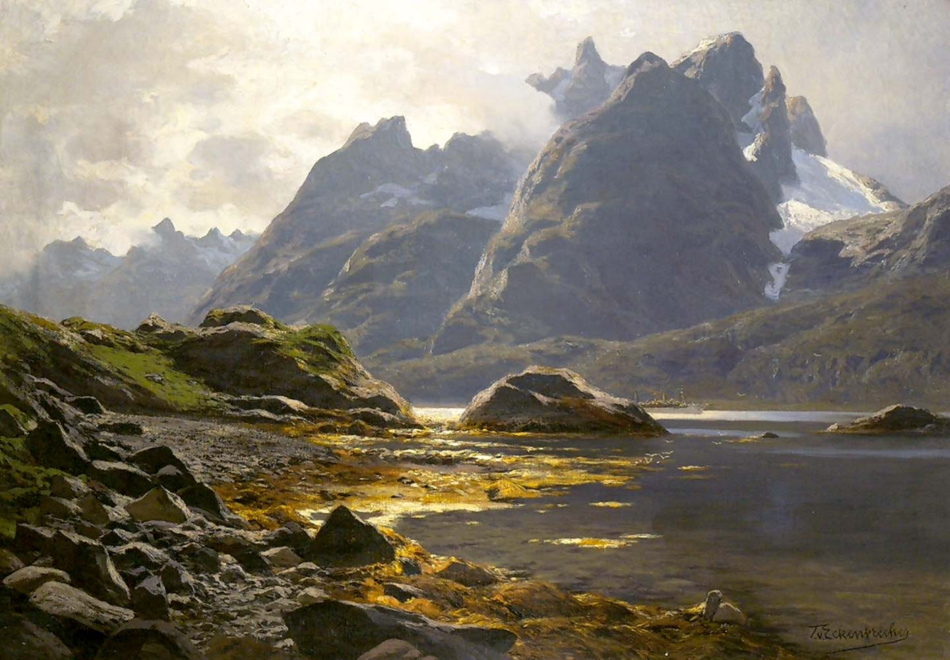
Raftsundet (strait) between Austvågøy and Hinnøya, painting by Eckenbrecher

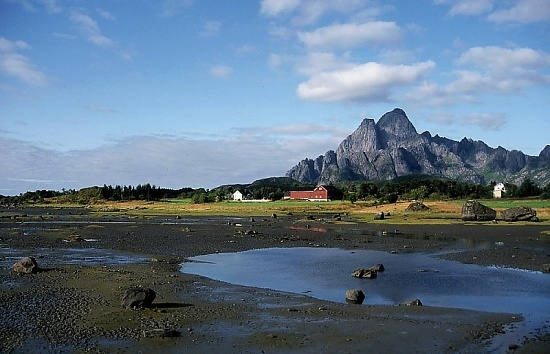
Vågakallen, at 942 metres in height

== See also ==
- List of islands of Norway by area
