= 1910 in Norway =

- Centuries: 18th; 19th; 20th; 21st
- Decades: 1890s; 1900s; 1910s; 1920s; 1930s
- See also: List of years in Norway

== Incumbents ==
- Monarch – Haakon VII.
- Prime Minister – Gunnar Knudsen (until 1 February); Wollert Konow

== Events ==
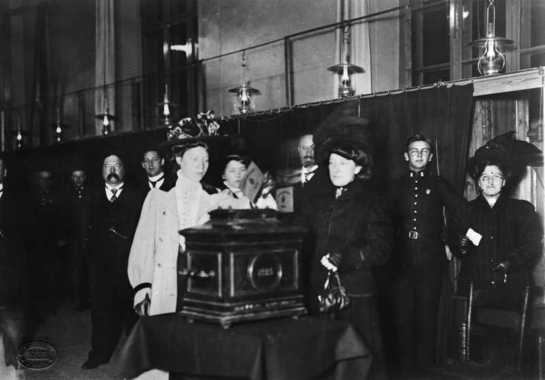
First woman to cast her vote in the municipal election, Akershus Castle.

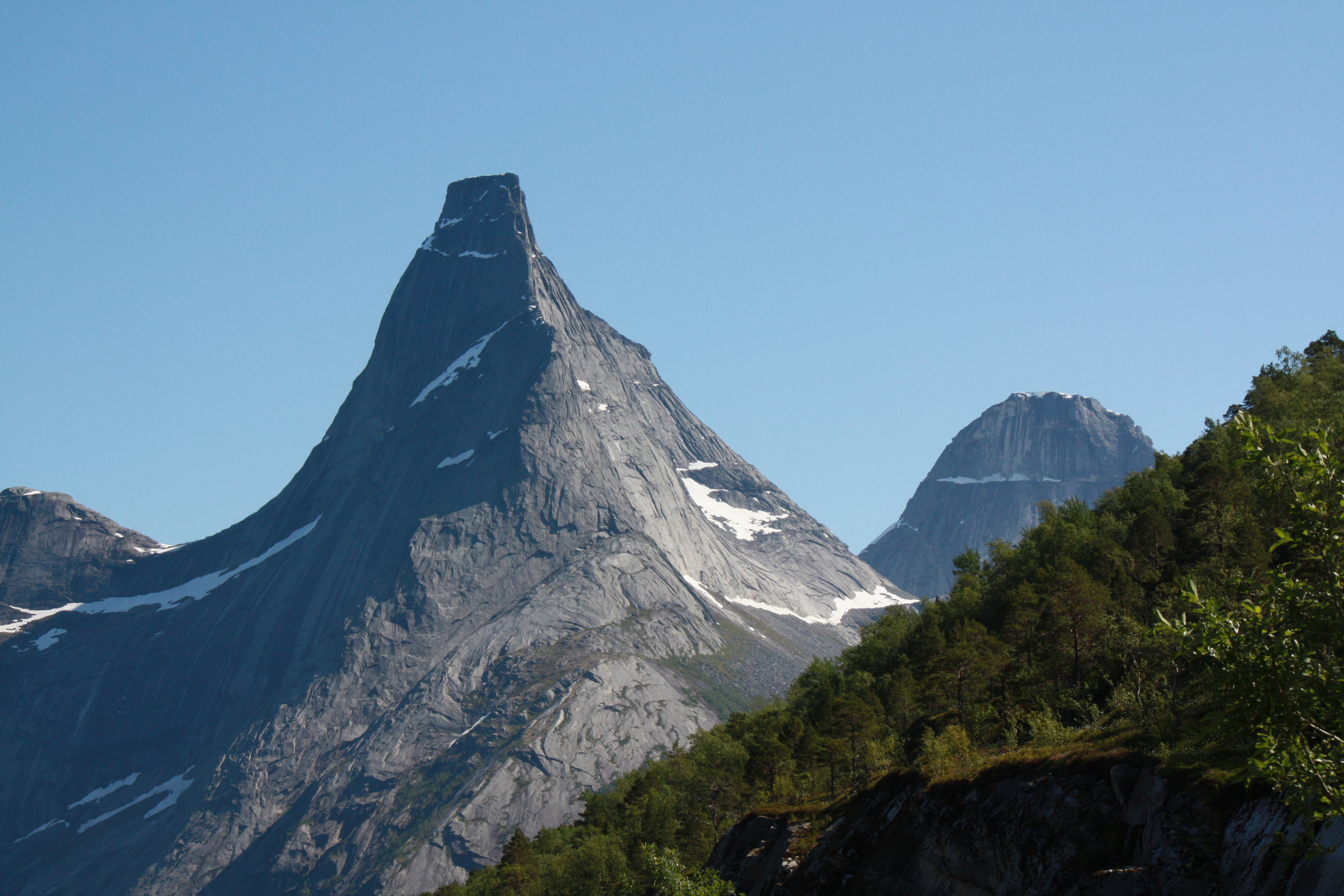
Stetind was first ascended in 1910 by Bryn, Rubenson and Schjelderup.

- 15 February – Norsk Gjærde- og Metaldukfabrik is established.
- 30 April – The Parliament passes a resolution about universal suffrage for women in municipal elections.
- 29 May – Nationalforeningen mot tuberkulose founded.
- 13 July – The railway line Kirkenes–Bjørnevatn opened.
- 30 July – First ascent of Stetind, by Bryn, Rubenson and Schjelderup.
- 1 August – First ascent of Svolværgeita, by Bryn, Rubenson and Schjelderup.
- 3 August – First ascent of Trakta, by Bryn, Rubenson and Schjelderup.
- 15 September – Norwegian Institute of Technology (Norges Tekniske Høgskole, (NTH)) is opened in Trondheim.
- 4 December – The railway line from Flisa to Elverum opened.
- Municipal and county elections are held throughout the country.
- Bøkfjord Lighthouse is established at the mouth of Bøkfjorden, outside Kirkenes.

== Popular culture ==
=== Sports ===
- 26 March – The sports club Grane SK (now: Bærum SK) is founded
- 29 May – The sports club Stenkjær FK founded
- 2 July – Norges Rigsforbund for Idræt is founded.

=== Full date unknown ===
- Eidsvold TF founded
- Hornindal IL founded
- Mjøndalen IF founded
- Stjørdal IL founded
- IL Varden founded
- Vestfossen IF founded

=== Literature ===
- 5 April – First issue of the newspaper Fjordenes Tidende.
- 5 May – First issue of the newspaper Tidens Tegn.

Full date unknown

- The periodical Kunst og Kultur established.
- The Olav Duun novel Nøkksjøliga (The Slope by Nøkk Lake) was published.
- The Knut Hamsund play Livet i Vold (In the Grip of Life), was published.

== Notable births ==
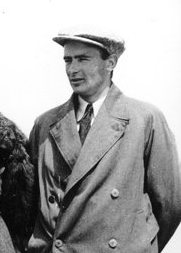
Trygve Bratteli, Natzweiler concentration camp survivor and Prime Minister.

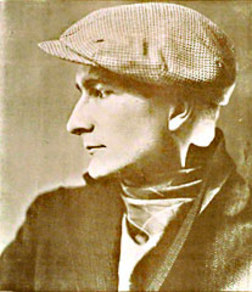
Jens Book-Jenssen came to be the best-selling Norwegian artist in the 20th century.

- 10 January – Kitty Petrine Fredriksen, politician (died 2003)
- 11 January – Trygve Bratteli, twice Prime Minister of Norway (died 1984)
- 14 January – Chris Bruusgaard, midwife (died 2000)
- 18 January – Jens Henrik Nordlie, military officer (died 1996)
- 18 January – Oddmund Hoel, politician (died 1983).
- 22 January – Petter Mørch Koren, politician (died 2004)
- 25 January – Alf Brodal, professor of anatomy (died 1988)
- 1 February (in Great Britain) – Birger Tvedt, physician (died 2002)
- 4 February – Asbjørn Lindhjem, politician (died 1994)
- 6 February – Gunnar Syverstad, resistance member (died 1945).
- 9 February – Rønnaug Alten, actress (died 2001)
- 14 February – Leif Juster, comedian, singer and actor (died 1995)
- 15 February – Odd Granlund, media personality (died 1982)
- 18 February – Randi Monsen, illustrator (died 1997)
- 24 February – Parelius Hjalmar Bang Berntsen, politician (died 1995).
- 1 March – Torgeir Svendsen, politician (died 1981)
- 13 March – Sverre Nordby, football goalkeeper (died 1978)
- 15 March – Rolf Johannessen, football defender (died 1965)
- 20 March – Edmund Fjærvoll, politician (died 1975).
- 20 March – Borghild Rud, illustrator (died 1999)
- 27 March – Ludvig Olai Botnen, politician (died 1987)
- 29 March – Ingrid Semmingsen, historian (died 1995)
- 16 April – Jens Haugland, politician and Minister (died 1991)
- 19 April – Magdalon Monsen, soccer player and Olympic bronze medallist (died 1953)
- 22 April – Lars L'Abée-Lund, police (died 1991)
- 27 April – Johan Melander, banker (died 1989)
- 28 April – Åsmund Sveen, writer (died 1963)
- 3 May – Sigbjørn Bernhoft Osa, folk musician, fiddler (died 1990)
- 9 May – Lorentz Brinch, barrister, military officer, resistance member and politician (died 1953)
- 14 May – Sverre Holm, sociologist (died 1996)
- 15 May – Onar Onarheim, businessperson (died 1988)
- 28 May – Helga Dagsland, nurse educator (died 2003).
- 2 June – Per Hurum, sculptor (died 1989)
- 3 June – Christian Hartmann, composer (died 1985)
- 12 June – Finn Brudevold, odontologist (died 2006)
- 14 June – Erling Engan, politician (died 1982)
- 19 June – Lilli Gjerløw, archivist (died 1998)
- 21 June – Ole Martin Ystgaard, dairy leader (died 1970)
- 23 June – Arthur Mørch Hansson, diplomat (d. 1969)
- 26 June – Ole Otto Paus, general and diplomat (died 2003)
- 4 July – Erling Viksjø, architect (died 1971)
- 9 July – Torrey Mosvold, entrepreneur (died 1995)
- 27 July – Per Fossum, alpine skier (died 2004)
- 27 July – Lorentz Nitter, physician (died 1997)
- 31 July – Svein Helling, sports shooter (died 1978).
- 7 August – Ingeborg Lyche, civil servant (died 1990)
- 11 August – Sigmund Selberg, mathematician (died 1994)
- 11 August – Arne Selberg, engineer (died 1989)
- 26 August – Finn Halse, writer (died 1980)
- 13 September – Olav Mosebekk, artist (died 2001)
- 30 September – Osvald Harjo, resistance member (died 1993)
- 7 October – Halfdan Gran Olsen, rower (died 1971)
- 12 October – Ferdinand Finne, artist (died 1999)
- 13 October – Claes Gill, author, poet and actor (died 1973)
- 13 October – Magnar Isaksen, footballer (died 1979)
- 24 October – Sverre Marstrander, archaeologist (died 1986)
- 26 October (in Madagascar) – Alex Johnson, clergyman (died 1989)
- 5 November – Eigil Helland-Hansen, travel agent (died 1997)
- 7 November – Bjarne Daniel Solli, politician (died 1989)
- 9 November – Bernhard Paus, orthopedic surgeon and Freemason Grand Master (died 1999).
- 12 November – Arvid Johansen, politician (died 1996)
- 14 November – Jens Book-Jenssen, singer, revue artist and theatre director (died 1999)
- 21 November – Erik Braadland, diplomat and politician (died 1988)
- 1 December (in Copenhagen) – Per Palle Storm, sculptor (died 1994)
- 12 December – Aslaug Låstad Lygre, poet (died 1966)
- 13 December – Leif J. Wilhelmsen, philologist and politician (died 1976)
- 16 December – Ivar Johansen, bobsledder (died 1984)
- 18 December – Edvard Magnus Edvardsen, politician (died 2000)
- 21 December – Ole J. Malm, physician (died 2005)
- 26 December – Roar Hauglid, art historian (died 2001)
- 27 December – Karl Olsen, civil servant (died 1999)
- 30 December – Erling Nilsen, boxer (died 1984)

=== Full date unknown ===
- Ole Arntzen, Businessman and Milorg leader (died 1973)

== Notable deaths ==
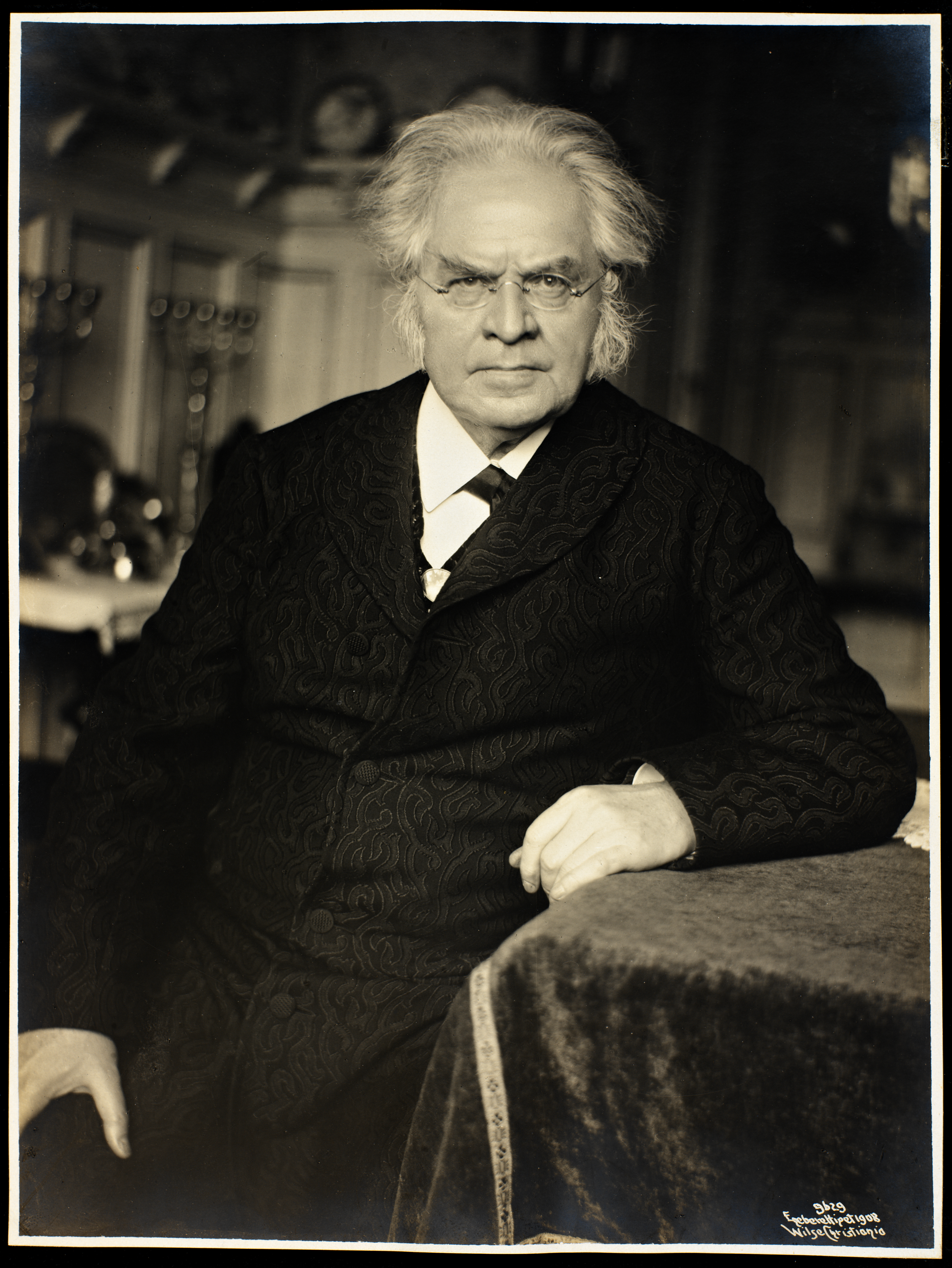
Nobel laureate Bjørnstjerne Bjørnson died in 1910.

- 8 January – Christian Fürst, architect (born 1860)
- 8 February – Hans Jæger, writer, philosopher and anarchist political activist (born 1854).
- 24 February – John Anderson, Norwegian-American publisher (born 1836).
- 7 April – Theodor Nilsen Stousland, politician (born 1842).
- 26 April – Bjørnstjerne Bjørnson, writer and the 1903 Nobel Prize in Literature laureate (born 1832).
- 20 May – Oscar Wergeland, painter (born 1844).
- 2 July (in Germany) – Elias Sunde, politician and Minister (born 1851).
- 19 July – Carl August Gulbranson, businessperson and politician (born 1831)
- 30 August – Viggo Ullmann, educator and politician (born 1848).
- 16 September John Utheim, teacher and politician (born 1847)
- 24 October – Toini Topelius, Finnish journalist who settled in Norway (born 1854)
- 25 October – Lorentz Henrik Müller Segelcke, politician and Minister (born 1829).
- 9 November – Hans Larsen Saakvitne, farmer, bailiff and politician (born 1839)
- 15 November – Emil Schreiner, philologist and educator (born 1831).
- 11 December – Lars Olsen Skrefsrud, missionary and language researcher in India (born 1840).
- 19 December – Anders Daae, prison director (born 1838)
- 19 December U. V. Koren, Norwegian-American author, theologian and church leader (born 1826)
- 24 December Gudbrand Gregersen de Saág, Norwegian-Hungarian bridge engineer, architect and member of the Hungarian nobility (born 1824).
- 29 December – Henrik Thrap-Meyer, architect (born 1833).

=== Full date unknown ===
- Axel Nicolai Herlofson, fraudster (born 1845)
- Johan Vaaler, inventor (born 1866).
