= Schjelderup =

Schjelderup is a surname. Notable people with the surname include:

- Andreas Schjelderup (born 2004), Norwegian footballer
- Ferdinand Schjelderup (1886–1955), Norwegian mountaineer, Supreme Court Justice and resistance member during the German occupation of Norway
- Gerhard Schjelderup (1859–1933), Norwegian composer
- Gunnar Schjelderup (1895–1972), Norwegian businessperson
- Guttorm Schjelderup (born 1961), Norwegian economist
- Harald K. Schjelderup (1895–1974), Norwegian physicist, philosopher and psychologist
- Ingrid Schjelderup (disambiguation), several people
- John Schjelderup Giæver (1901–1970), Norwegian author and polar researcher
- Kristian Vilhelm Koren Schjelderup, Jr. (1894–1980), Norwegian bishop, son of Kristian Vilhelm Koren Schjelderup, Sr.
- Kristian Vilhelm Koren Schjelderup, Sr. (1853–1913), Norwegian bishop, father of Kristian Vilhelm Koren Schjelderup, Jr.
- Melchior Schjelderup Olsson Fuhr (1790–1869), Norwegian politician
- Mon Schjelderup (1870–1934), Norwegian composer and pianist
- Thorleif Frederik Schjelderup (1859–1931), Norwegian businessperson
- Thorleif Schjelderup (1920–2006), Norwegian author and in the 1940s and 1950s one of Norway's best ski jumpers
- Thorleif Schjelderup-Ebbe (1894–1982), Norwegian zoologist who described the pecking order of hens
