= Fred Schreiner =

Fred Schreiner may refer to:

- Frank Schreiner (1879–1937), American water polo player
- Fred Schreiner (footballer) (born 1961), Luxembourgian football midfielder
- Fredrik Schreiner (1905–1988), Norwegian civil servant
