= Carl Wilhelm Rubenson =

Swedish-born Norwegian mountaineer and writer

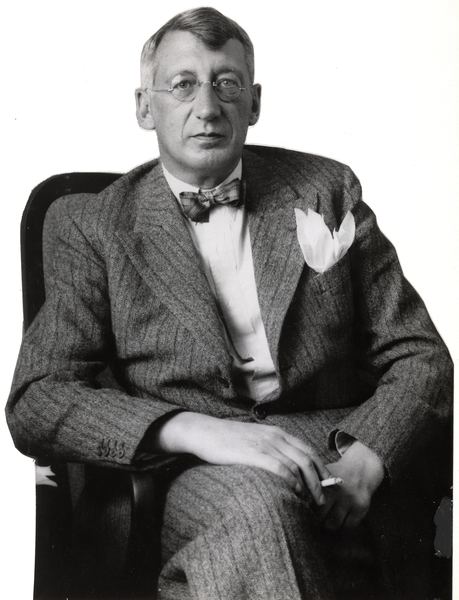
- Carl Wilhelm Rubenson, c. 1933
- Born: 30 July 1885; Stockholm, Sweden
- Died: 29 July 1960 (aged 74)
- Occupations: Mountaineer and non-fiction writer
- Spouse: Ragnhild Fougner Rubenson
- Awards: Honorary membership of the British Alpine Club and Norsk Tindeklub

Carl Wilhelm Rubenson (30 July 1885 – 29 July 1960) was a Swedish-born Norwegian mountaineer and non-fiction writer.

== Personal life ==
Rubenson was born in Stockholm to landowner Carl Otto Rubenson and Elise Johansen. He married Ragnhild Fougner in 1911.

== Climbing career ==
In 1906 Rubenson made several first ascents in Jotunheimen, together with Ferdinand Schjelderup and Agnes Jachelln. In October 1907, Ingvald Monrad Aas and he reached a height of 7,270 m at the Himalayan mountain Kabru, possibly the highest altitude anybody had reached until then. However, Rubenson and Aas themselves believed that Graham, Boss, and Kaufmann had reached the same point on Kabru in 1883, an opinion shared with most contemporary climbers and supported by recent analysis. He co-founded the Norwegian mountaineering club Norsk Tindeklub in 1908, together with Alf Bryn, Ferdinand Schjelderup, Henning Tønsberg and others. He made the first ascent of the Norwegian mountain Stetind in 1910, together with Alf Bonnevie Bryn and Ferdinand Schjelderup. The three climbers reached the top of Stetind on 30 July 1910, on Rubenson's 25th birthday. This was the first of a number of first ascents to follow the next two weeks in Northern Norway. On 1 August Rubenson, Bryn and Schjelderup made the first ascent of Svolværgeita, on the Lofoten island of Austvågøy. Their route is called 1910 Ruta ("The 1910 Route"). This route includes a famous diagonal traverse across the north wall of the mountain, which was led by Rubenson. The group reached the top by 11 pm on 1 August. On 3 August 1910 the same group climbed Trakta on Northern Austvågøy, a mountain considered among the hardest summits to reach in Norway. Also this was a first ascent, where they climbed the main summit (Vestre Trakta) via the Northwest Ridge. Rubenson was part of the group that first attempted a winter ascent of Store Skagastølstind, but this attempt failed because of harsh snow conditions and risk of avalanches.

Among Rubenson's books are Fjeldsport før og nu and Med telt og husbaat i Kashmir, both from 1923. He was awarded honorary membership of both the British Alpine Club and Norsk Tindeklub.

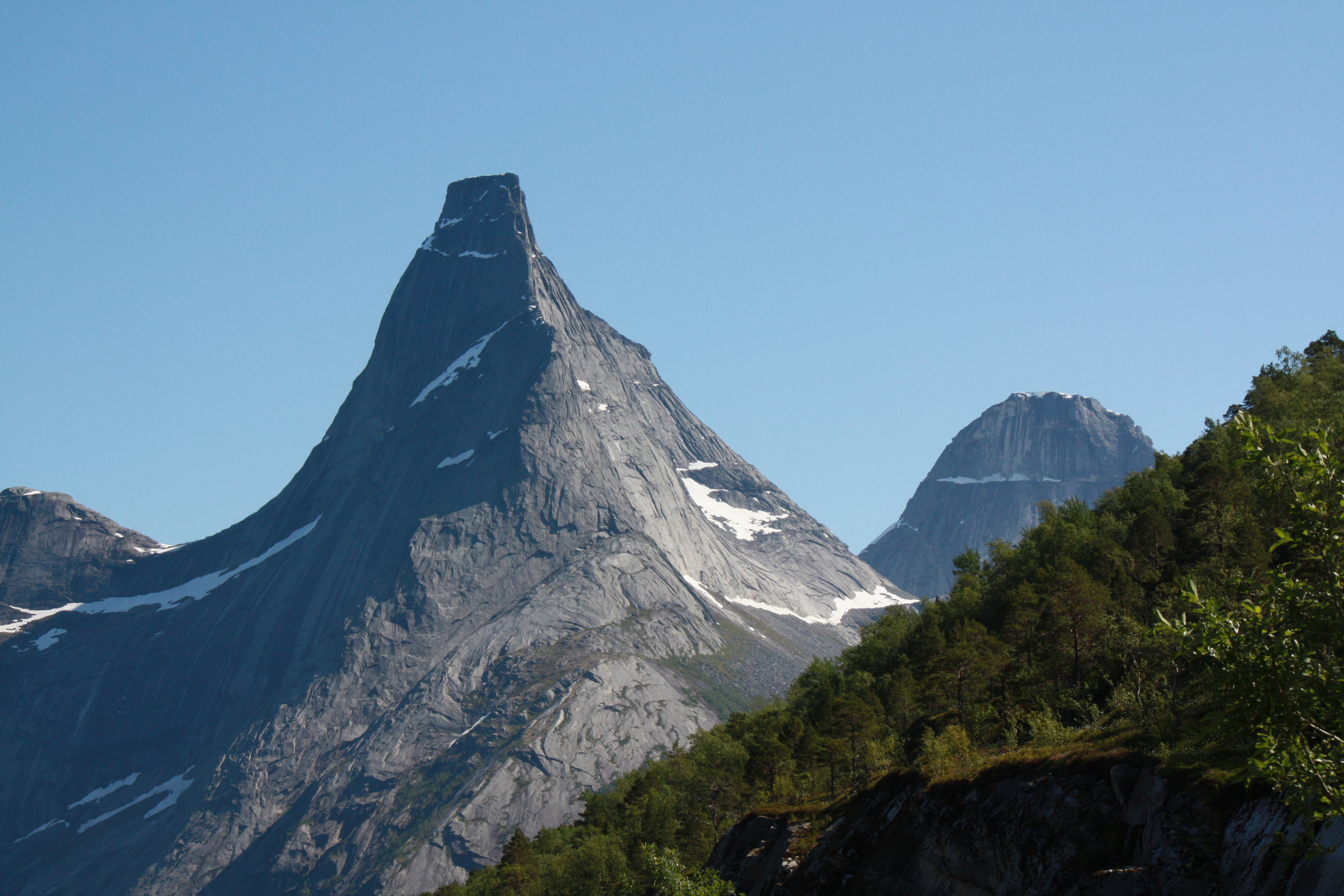
Stetind was first climbed in 1910 by Bryn, Rubenson and Schjelderup.
