= Alf Bonnevie Bryn =

- Born: 26 August 1889; Kristiania, Norway
- Died: 12 September 1949 (aged 60)
- Occupations: Patent engineer, mountaineer, novelist and non-fiction writer
- Known for: Co-founder of Norsk Tindeklub; First ascents of Stetind, Svolværgeita, Trakta and Klokketind
- Notable work: –Tinder og banditter –Crime novels with detective "Peter van Heeren"
- Parent: Alfred Jørgen Bryn
- Relatives: Knud Bryn (uncle); Halfdan Bryn (uncle); Jacob Aall Bonnevie (grandfather); Thomas Bryn (great-grandfather)

Alf Bonnevie Bryn (26 August 1889 – 12 September 1949) was a Norwegian patent engineer, mountaineer, golf player, novelist and non-fiction writer.

== Personal life ==
Bryn was born in Kristiania, the son of Alfred Jørgen Bryn and a grandson of Jacob Aall Bonnevie. He was married to Sofie Lind Mortensen from 1912 to 1920, to Sigrid Gude from 1921 to 1945, and to Bodil Harriet Martinsen from 1946. He died in Oslo in 1949.

== Career ==
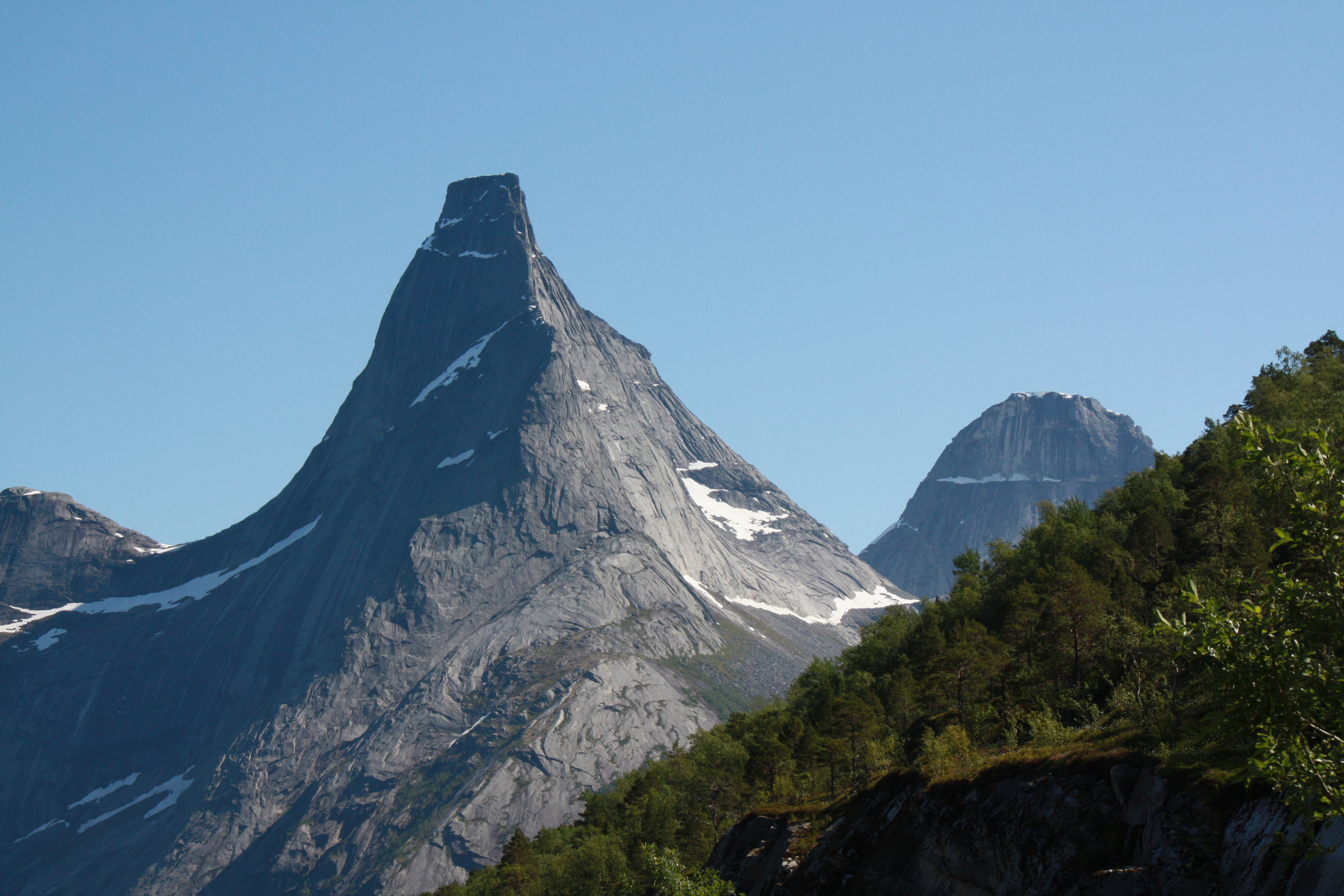
Stetind was first climbed in 1910 by Bryn, Rubenson and Schjelderup.

Bryn finished his secondary education in 1906, and then enrolled for engineering studies in Switzerland. He was an eager climber, and was a co-founder of the mountaineering club Norsk Tindeklub in 1908. He made several first ascents in Switzerland, Corsica and Norway, including the first successful ascent of Stetind in 1910 (together with Ferdinand Schjelderup and Carl Wilhelm Rubenson). Among his 1910 climbs were also first ascents of the Lofoten summits Svolværgeita and Trakta, both times accompanied by Schjelderup and Rubenson, and the first ascent of Klokketind.

Bryn graduated from the Polytechnicum in Zürich in 1911, and subsequently worked for his father's patent office for many years. During this period he took part in a number of different sports, both as athlete and organizer. These included golf, tennis, boxing, rowing and motor sports. He also published several crime novels, about the detective "Peter van Heeren". These were later basis for a film from 1957. He was among the supporters of Amundsen and Nobile's 1926 Polar Expedition with the airship Norge. In 1927 he established his own company, Alf B. Bryns Patentbyrå. In 1931 he defended his doctorate thesis on patent law, Über die Frage der Erfindungshöhe. He subsequently published articles and books on the subject. From 1940 to 1941, he worked as manager at the Ministry of Provisioning. He was arrested in 1941, and released after five months in custody, at Møllergata 19 and Grini. In 1943 he published the book Tinder og banditter about climbing experiences in Corsica together with George Finch and Max Finch.
