= Brudevold =

Brudevold is a Norwegian surname. Notable people with the surname include:

- Finn Brudevold (1910–2006), Norwegian-American odontologist and educator
- Trygve Brudevold (1920–2021), Norwegian bobsledder
