= Vestfjorden =

Fjord in Nordland, Norway

- Map of the fjord
- Interactive map of the fjord
- Location: Nordland county, Norway
- Coordinates: 68°03′N 14°46′E
- Type: Fjord
- Basin countries: Norway
- Max. length: 155 kilometres (96 mi)
- Max. width: 80 kilometres (50 mi)

Vestfjorden (lit. 'the western fjord'; sometimes shortened to Vestfjord in English) is a 155-kilometre (96 mi) long fjord or oceanic sea in Nordland county, Norway.

The name literally means "the west fjord", although it is called a fjord, it could best be described as a firth or an open bight of sea. The "fjord" lies between the Lofoten archipelago and the Salten district of mainland Norway. The term fjord (from the old Norse fjördr meaning firth or inlet) is used in a more general way for bodies of water in the western Scandinavian languages than the more narrow usage commonly used in English.

The Vestfjorden flows from the area near the town of Narvik to the west and southwest. The mouth of the Vestfjorden is about 80 kilometres (50 mi) wide, roughly running from the mainland town of Bodø to the islands of Røstlandet and Værøya to the northwest of Bodø.

The Vestfjorden is famous for its cod fishery, which was exploited back to the early medieval period. More recently, the winter invasion of Orcas in the inner parts of Vestfjord has become a tourist attraction. Strong winds with heavy seas are not uncommon in winter.

== Media gallery ==
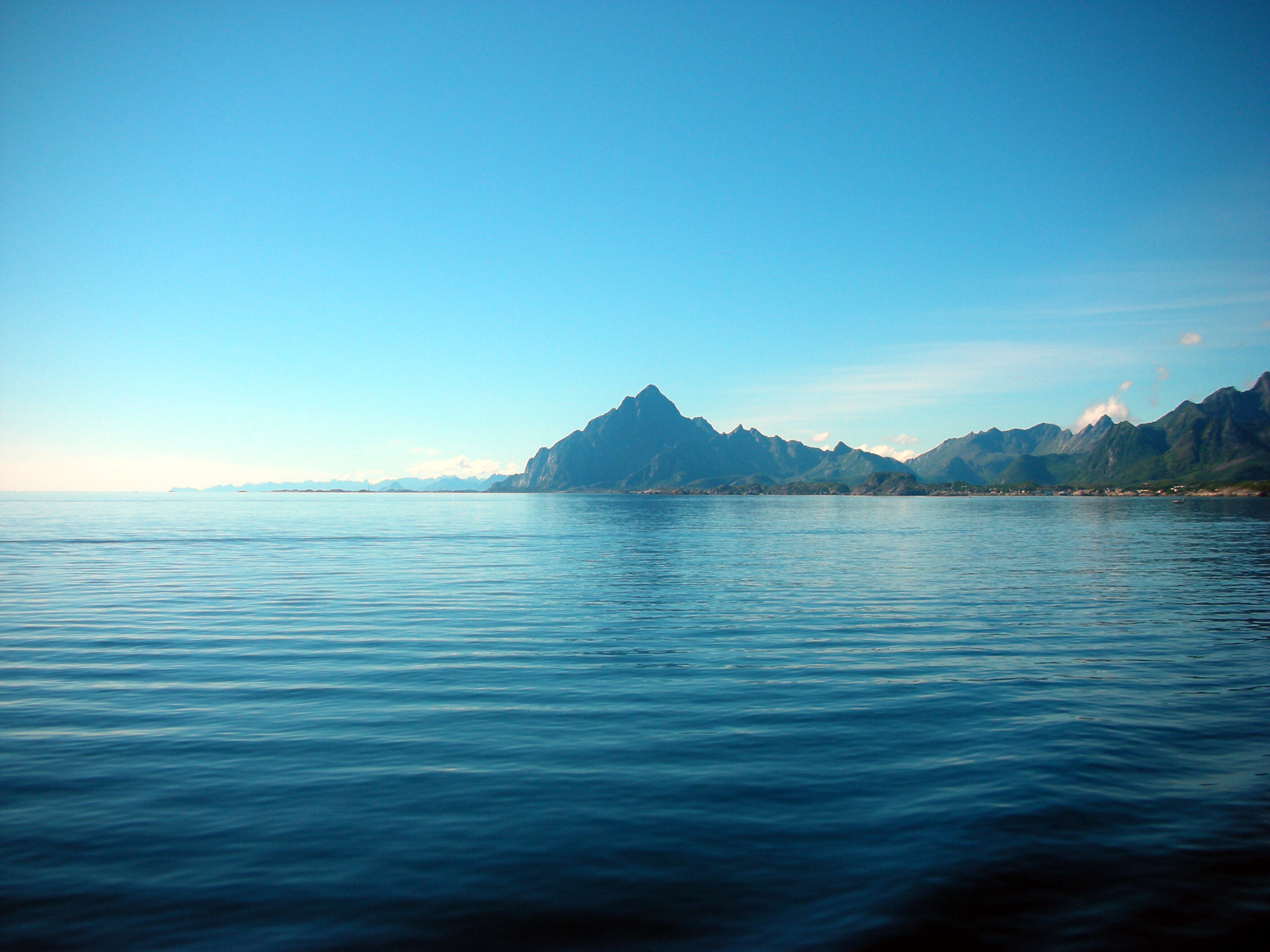
Vågakallen mountain and the Lofoten wall, view towards west

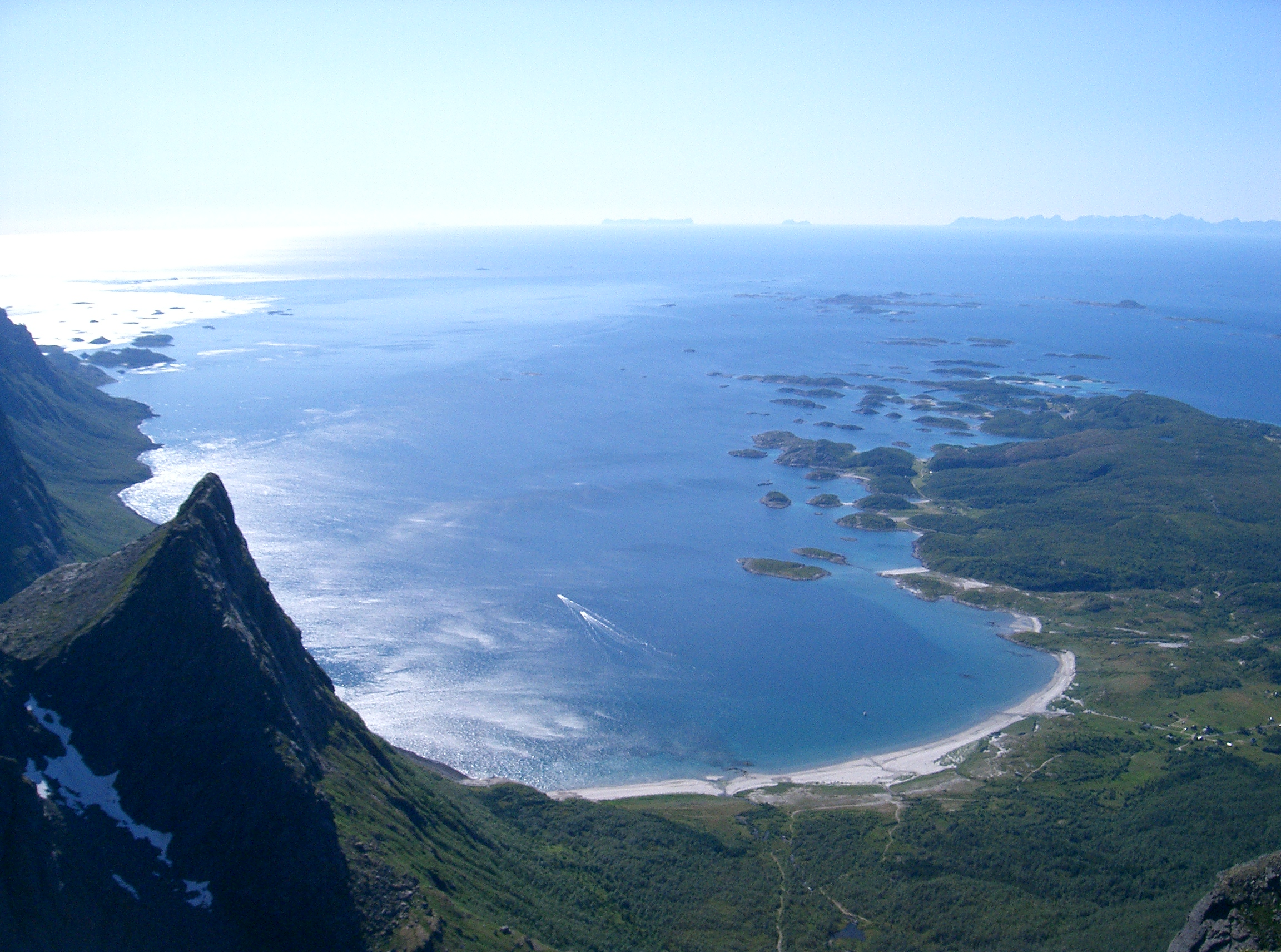
Vestfjord seen from a mountain in Steigen Municipality, with the southern part of the Lofoten wall visible on the right

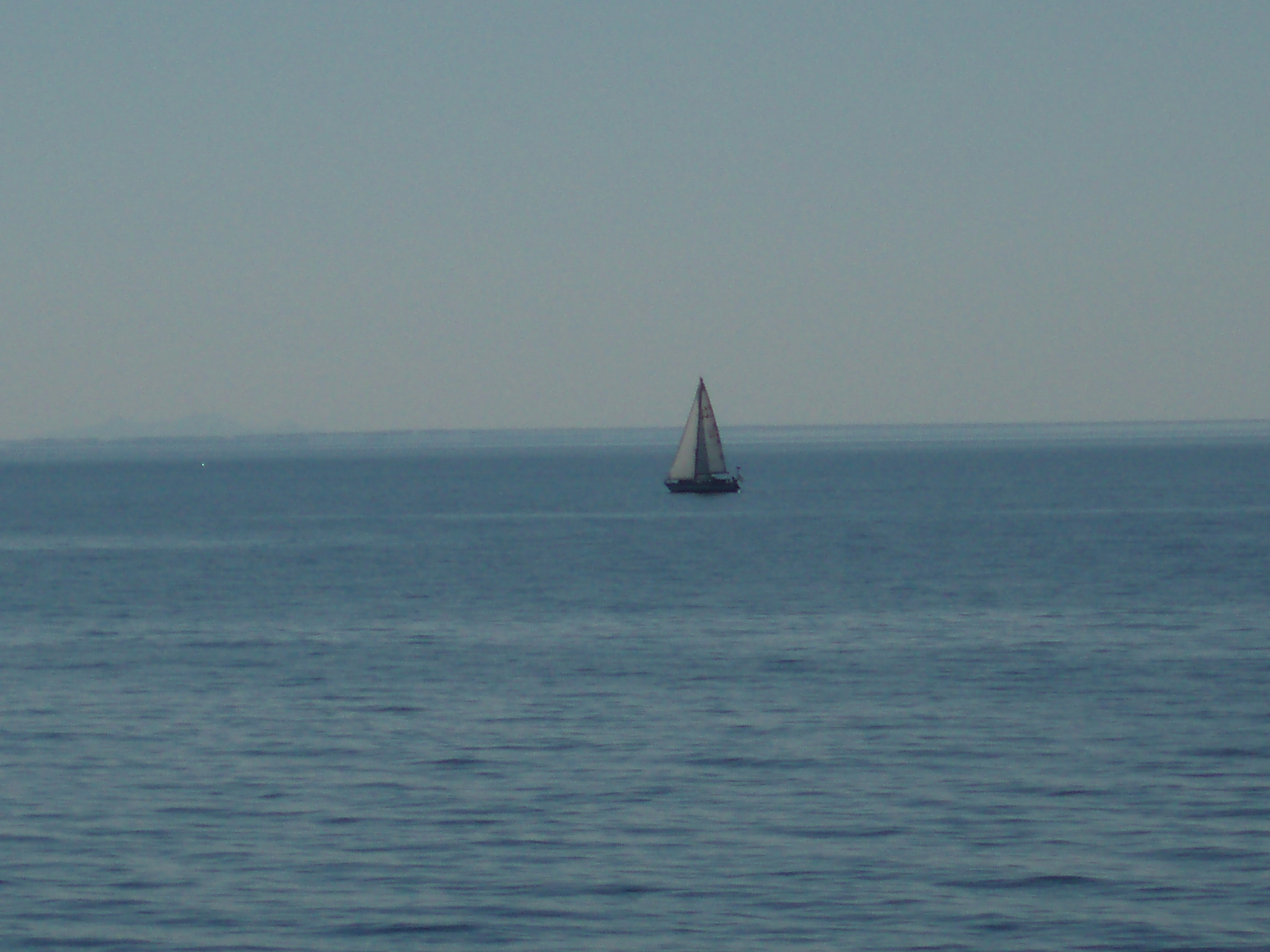
A calm summer day on Vestfjorden
