= Svolværgeita =

Mountain in Nordland, Norway

Geita
- Svolværgeita / Spålla
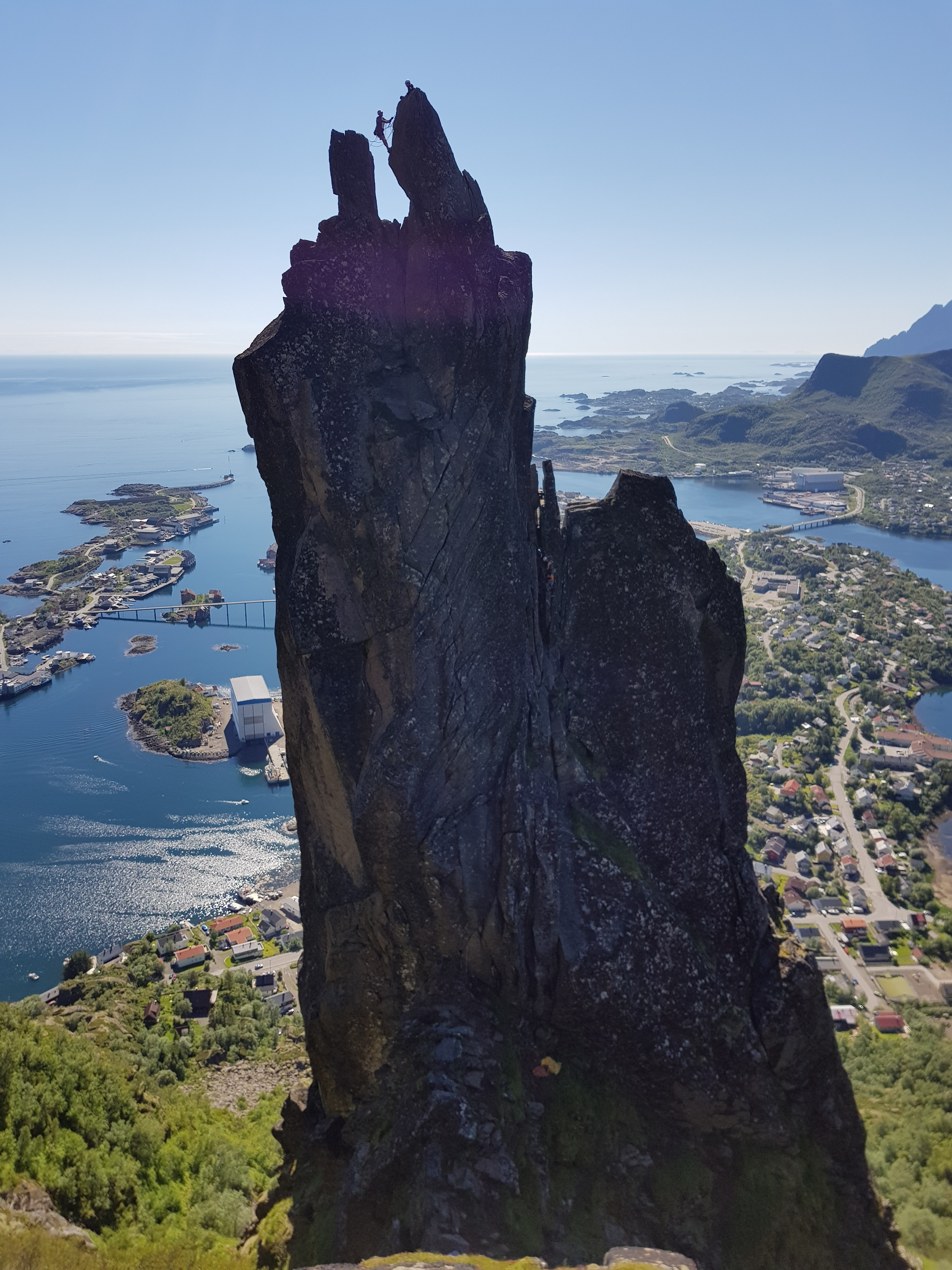

Highest point
- Elevation: 150 m (490 ft)
- Coordinates: 68.2463°N 14.5884°E

Geography
- Interactive map of the mountain
- Location: Nordland, Norway

Climbing
- First ascent: 1 August 1910: Ferdinand Schjelderup, Alf Bonnevie Bryn and Carl Wilhelm Rubenson

Geita or Svolværgeita (Northern Sami: Spålla) is a 150-metre (490 ft) tall pinnacle at the southwest face of the mountain Fløyfjellet on the island of Austvågøya in the Lofoten archipelago. The 569-metre (1,867 ft) high Fløyfjellet is located on the edge of the town of Svolvær in Vågan Municipality in Nordland county, Norway. The first recorded time a climber reached the summit of Svolværgeita was on 1 August 1910 by Ferdinand Schjelderup, Alf Bonnevie Bryn, and Carl Wilhelm Rubenson.

== Name ==
The official name of the mountain is Geita. The name is the finite form of geit which means "goat" since the mountain has two "horns". The two horns are called Storhorn and Lillehorn. By descending from Storhorn, it is common to jump over a 1.5 metres (4 ft 11 in) wide gap and land safely on Lillehorn, while viewing the town cemetery 300 metres (980 ft) below. The name is unofficially prefixed with "Svolvær" since it is located in that town.

== First ascent ==
The 1910 Route was first climbed by Bryn, Schjelderup, and Rubinson. They reached the top by 11:00 pm on 1 August 1910. Their route includes a diagonal traverse across the north wall of the mountain, led by Rubinson. Before the climb, the three had bet a local hotel owner a bottle of wine that they would reach the Goat summit. The group of Bryn, Schjelderup, and Rubinson had shortly before finished the first successful ascent of Stetind, on 30 July. Two days later, on 3 August, the same group made the first ascent of Trakta, one of the most difficult summits to reach in Norway.

== Climbing routes ==
In addition to The 1910 Route, several other routes to the summit of The Goat have been described. The longest and classic route is The Front Side (grade 5+), first climbed by Wilhelm Høyer and Alf Krane in 1947. Another route is The Vegetarian (grade 5, A1). The route Highway to heaven (grade 6+, A2) was first ascended in August 1991. The Rappel Route (grade 5) was first top-roped by Svein Smaaskjær in the 1960s. The Back Side (also called The Spiral Route) (grad 5+) was first climbed in 1928 by Bror Bommen and Bjørn Lyche. The harder Angelwings (grad 6+) was first aid climbed by Arild Meyer and Hugo Bjørnstad in 1974, and first free-climbed in 1993 by Ed Webster, Arild Meyer, and Odd-Roar Wik. Local-born mountain climber Geir Rune Holm is the first to have reached 1000 trips to the summit. This milestone was set on the 3rd of October, 2021.
