= Claus Winter Hjelm =

Norwegian judge and legal scholar

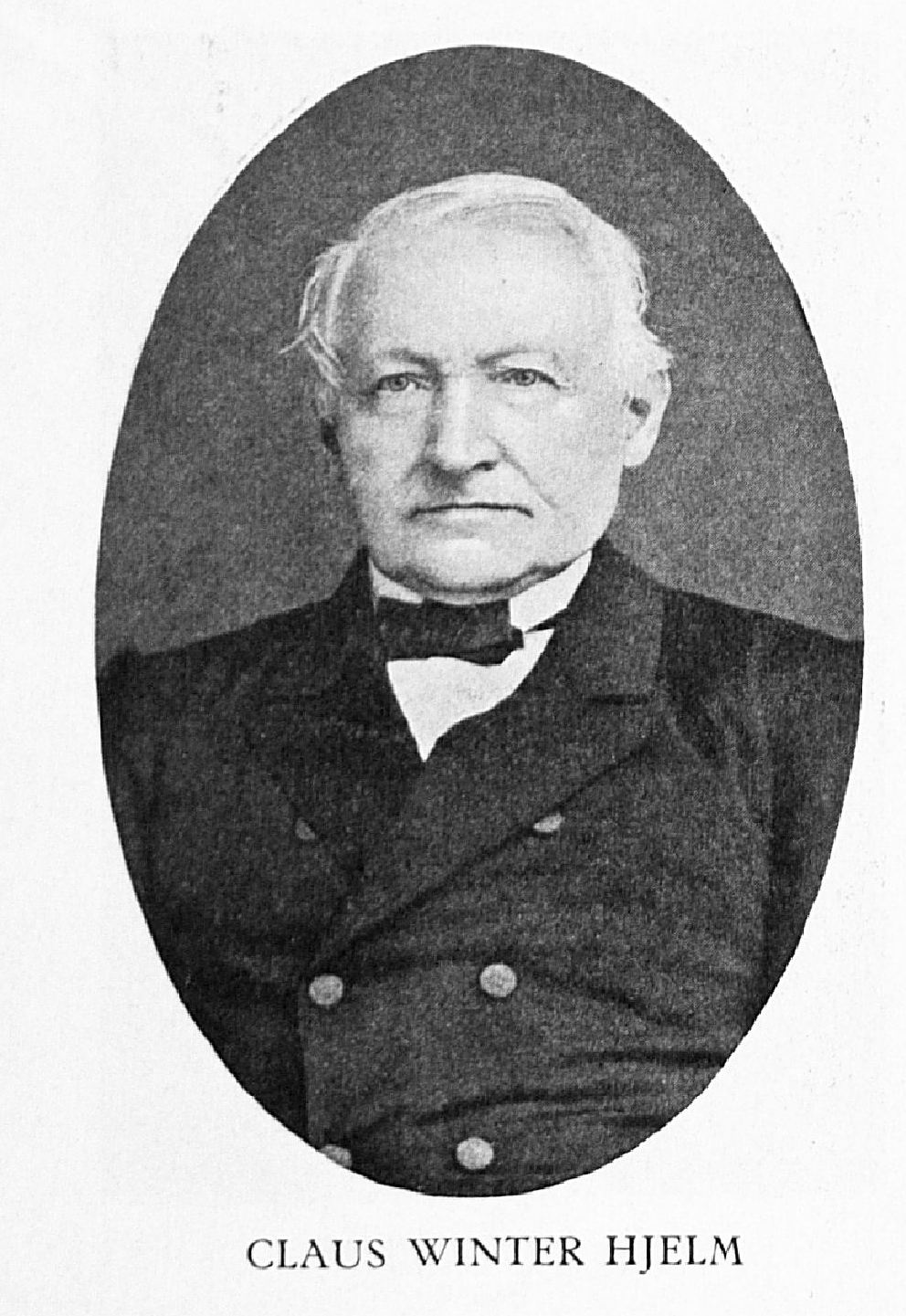
Claus Winter Hjelm.

Claus Winter Hjelm, also known as Winter-Hjelm (21 May 1797 – 22 October 1871) was a Norwegian legal scholar and judge.

== Personal life ==
He was born in the prestegjeld of Strand as the son of Claus Winter Hjelm, Sr. and Serine Gundersdatter.

In September 1828 he married Wilhelmine Johanne von Munthe af Morgenstierne (1810–1858). His father-in-law was then Bredo Henrik von Munthe af Morgenstierne, Sr., and through the Morgenstierne family he was also an uncle of Bredo Henrik von Munthe af Morgenstierne, Christian Otto Carl Lasson and Bredo Henrik Lasson. Claus' and Wilhelmine's son Otto Winter-Hjelm was a notable musician. Their daughter Emilie Constance Hjelm married architect Georg Andreas Bull, a brother of Ole Bull and grandnephew of Johan Randulf Bull. They had several children, including architect Henrik Bull.

== Career ==
Claus Winter Hjelm was hired as a lecturer in jurisprudence at the Royal Frederick University in 1826, and promoted to professor in 1834. From 1843 he was a Supreme Court Justice. He died in 1871 in Christiania.
