= Halfdan Bryn =

Norwegian physician and anthropologist (1864–1933)

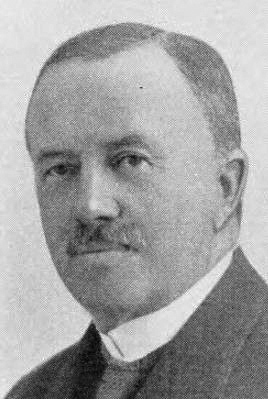
Halfdan Bryn picture

Halfdan Bryn (20 May 1864 – 5 March 1933) was a Norwegian physician and physical anthropologist.

== Early life ==
Bryn was born in Trondheim, Norway, the son of physician Thomas Bryn (1813–1902) and Kristine Emilie Karoline Richter (1826–1869). He was a grandson of Thomas Bryn, Sr., and a brother of Knud Ørn Bryn and Alfred Jørgen Bryn. In November 1892, he married Wilhelmine "Willa" Thane (1873–1929). He was also an uncle of Alf Bonnevie Bryn and Finn Bryn.

Bryn took his examen artium in 1882 and graduated cand.med. from the University of Oslo in 1889.

== Military career ==
Bryn first practised as a physician in Dakota and New York between 1890 and 1891, before working as a chief resident at the hospital in Trondheim from 1891 to 1892, and then starting his own medical practice. However, he was conscripted as an army doctor, at first with the rank of lieutenant. He served at first as a military doctor in Trondheim, from 1894 holding the rank of captain. He was head of the Decorative Line Company from 1901 to 1904 and of the land conservation partnership from 1904 to 1907. In 1911, he was appointed brigade major and from 1916 was medical physician to the 5th Brigade, remaining in this position until 1924, when he was discharged from the military.

As an army doctor, Bryn had good opportunities to study men from different parts of the country. His work with military recruits inspired him to do research on physical anthropology. Recognizing his interest, Colonel Hans Daae made it possible for him to conduct studies in the field, sometimes almost on a full-time basis. In 1914, he published his first anthropological work, Anthropological surveys I, and in 1917, he won the King Haakon VII gold medal for another work. That same year, he received a scholarship from the Nansen Fund for conducting anthropological studies in Norway.

== Anthropological career ==
After Bryn left the military, he concentrated on anthropological research. Despite his relatively advanced age, he was extremely productive and provided a number of interesting contributions to the country's anthropology, at a time when industrialization and restructuring of society had not yet made their mark on the population. Already in 1921, he had presented two remarkable works, Selbu and Tydal and also published the controversial article En nordisk Cro-Magnon type, which claimed that people in Tydal Municipality were descendants of the Cro-Magnon. He released volume one of the uncompleted work Anthropologia Norwegica in 1925, and Die Somatologie der Norweger together with Kristian Schreiner in 1929. In 1932, he published Norwegische Samen, being one of the first to take an interest in the physical anthropology of the Sami people.

Despite not holding a doctoral degree, Bryn was a fellow of the learned societies Royal Norwegian Society of Sciences and Letters from 1892, and of the Norwegian Academy of Science and Letters from 1923. He was also a member of Trondhjem city council from 1898 to 1914 and, in 1919, he was invited to join the Norwegian Society for Heredity Research. From 1921 to 1922, he chaired the Norwegian Medical Association. From 1926 to 1933, he served as praeses of the Royal Norwegian Society of Sciences and Letters, during which time he received an honorary degree from Uppsala University in 1927.

Bryn initially experienced great success and influence through his earlier works; for instance, in 1920, he was referred to as "Norway's most famous anthropologist" by Kristian Emil Schreiner. At this time, Bryn was considered a well-established and fairly uncontroversial member of Norwegian academia. Norway's leading academic contemporaries on issues of genetics and heredity, such as Kristinne Bonnevie, Otto Lous Mohr, Kristian & Alette Schreiner belonged to his academic circle. Toward the later years of his life, the same prominent members of that society would develop a more critical attitude towards his research methods; he would become a controversial figure among anthropologists. This was due to Bryn's contributions to scientific racism; his tendency to promote unorthodox, speculative, anthropological theories from scant and inconclusive evidence.

He was a close colleague of the notorious racial theorist Hans F. K. Günther, and collaborated with Herman Lundborg at the Swedish State Institute for Racial Biology, Statens institut för rasbiologi. His views on race were typical of nordicist Nordic race ideas during the interwar period. He viewed populations from Northern and Coastal Norway as bastardized populations of Nordic; dolichocephalic and brachycephalic; Lappish and Alpine stock. Bryn also referred to the populations of Trondheim and Møre as "inordinately well mixed bastard populations". One of Halfdan Bryn's correspondents for a short period in the early 1920s, who would eventually become a colleague, was Norway's leading eugenicist and racial hygienicist, Jon Alfred Mjøen. Contemporary academics such as Kristine Bonnevie and the Schreiners, viewed Mjøen as a dilettante. As Mjøen's controversial theories and related activism caused him to become ever more alienated from Norwegian academia, Bryn - whose research was relevant to Mjøen's theories - was sometimes called upon to correct Mjøen by his colleagues. Bryn, however, proved disinclined to do this, as he seemed to agree with much of Mjøen's work, and eventually allied himself with Mjøen to the exclusion of his former colleagues. He joined the International Federation of Eugenics Organizations under Mjøen's behest, but did not take an active interest in the organization. He died in March 1933, in Trondheim (the new city name from 1931).

Academic offices
Preceded by Axel Sommerfelt	Praeses of the Royal Norwegian Society of Sciences and Letters; 1926–1933	Succeeded by Ragnvald Iversen
