= Fløya =

Mountain in Nordland, Norway

- Fløyfjellet / Svolen (historic)
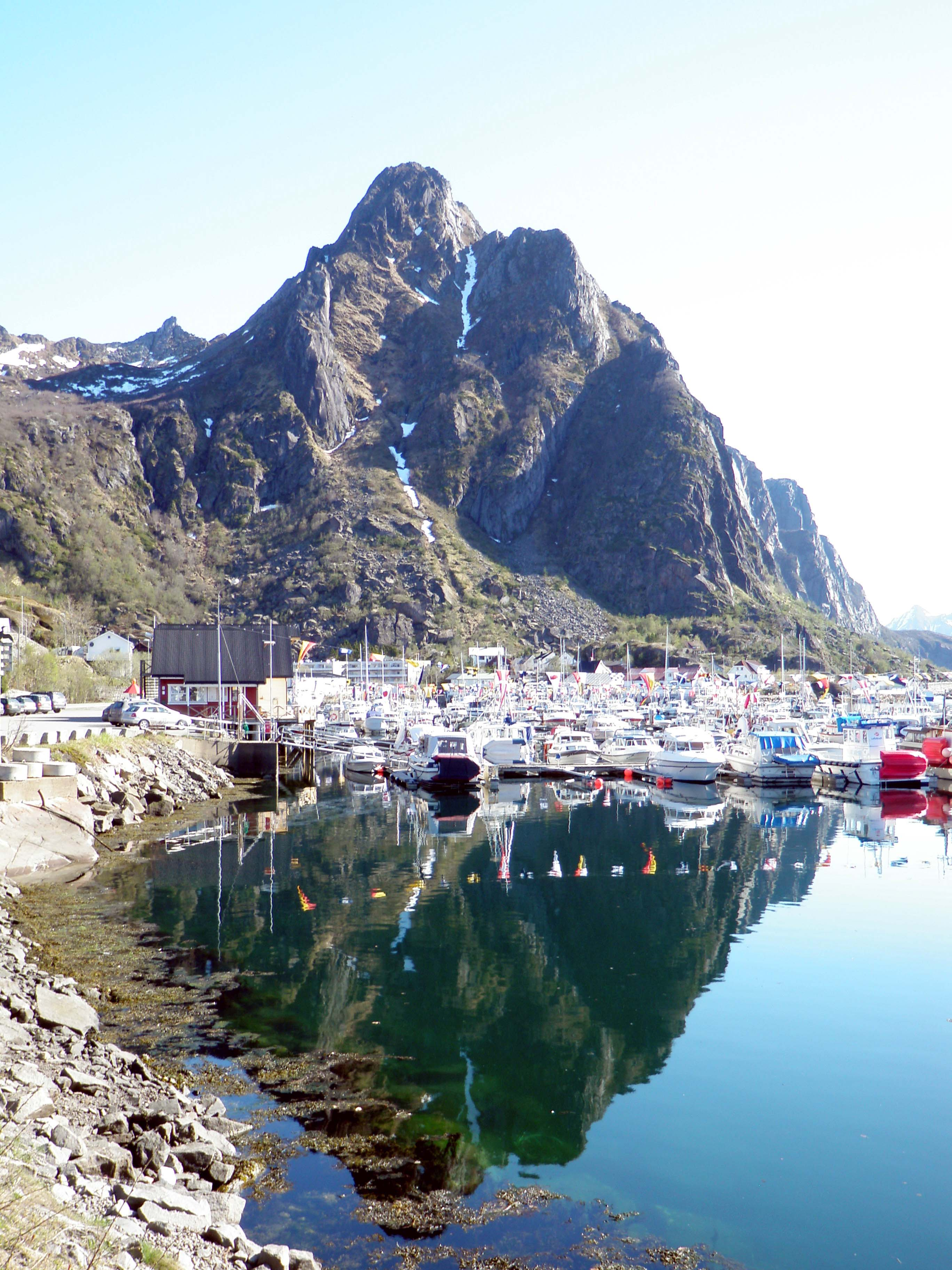
- Fløya seen from Svolvær

Highest point
- Elevation: 590 m (1,940 ft)
- Coordinates: 68.2483°N 14.6012°E

Geography
- Interactive map of the mountain
- Location: Nordland, Norway
- Parent range: Lofoten

Fløya (also known as Fløyfjellet or Svolen) is a mountain adjacent to the town of Svolvær in Vågan Municipality in Nordland county, Norway. The 590-metre (1,940 ft) tall mountain is located near the southeastern shore of the island of Austvågøya in the Lofoten archipelago.

The mountain is popular among climbers, in particular Svolværgeita, a 150 m (490 ft) high pinnacle at the southern face of Fløya, which resembles a goat with two horns.

== Name ==
The official name of the mountain is Fløya, but it is also known as Fløyfjellet. The mountain was historically called Svålen or Svolen and now that name usually refers to one of the lower peaks on the east side of the mountain.
