= Vilhelm Ludvig Herman von Munthe af Morgenstierne =

Norwegian politician (1814–1888)

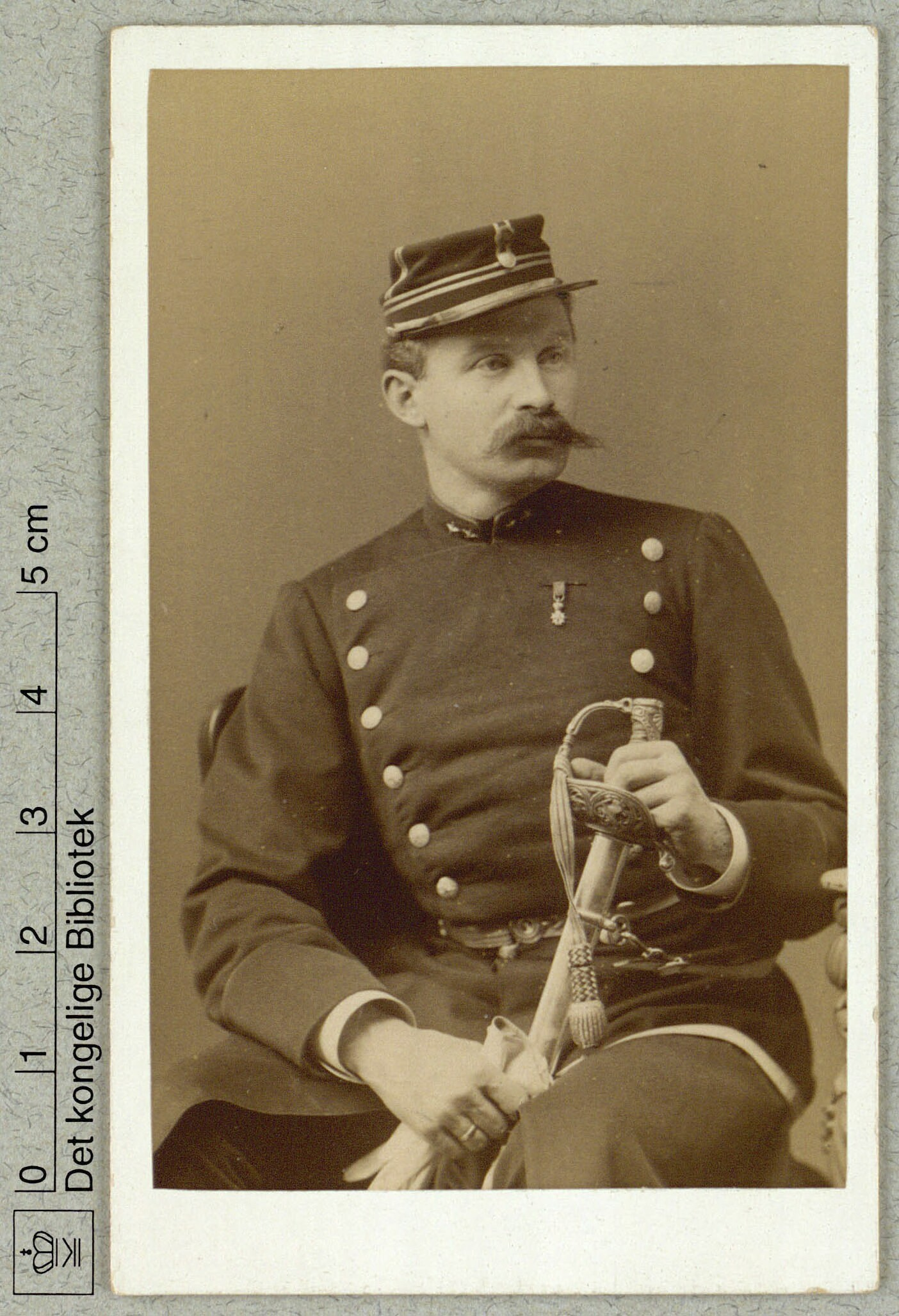

Vilhelm Ludvig Herman von Munthe af Morgenstierne (2 October 1814 – 30 December 1888) was a Norwegian politician, part of an old noble family.

He was born in Christiania as the son of Bredo Henrik von Munthe af Morgenstierne and his wife Cathrine Elisabeth Fries. His brother Christian Fredrik Jacob was a jurist as well as chief of police in Christiania for some time. His sister Augusta Julie Georgine married Prime Minister Frederik Stang.

Vilhelm Ludvig Herman married Fredrikke Nicoline Wilhelmine N. Sibbern, a daughter of politician Valentin Christian Wilhelm Sibbern. They had several children. One of their sons, Bredo Henrik, became a professor, and married a sister of businessman Thorleif Frederik Schjelderup. Another son, Wilhelm Herman Ludvig, became a Major General. As his wife died in 1864, Vilhelm Ludvig Herman was married a second time; to Caroline Ottilia Pladt in 1866. They had four sons and one daughter.

Vilhelm Ludvig Herman von Munthe af Morgenstierne served as County Governor of Stavanger Amt from 1864 to his death in 1888.

Government offices
Preceded by Anton Theodor Harris	County Governor of Stavanger Amt; 1864–1888	Succeeded by Carl Lauritz Mechelborg Oppen
