= Ole Olsen Malm =

Norwegian politician

- Born: 14 March 1854; Stavanger, Norway
- Died: 16 May 1917 (aged 63); Kristiania
- Occupations: Physician, veterinarian, civil servant and politician
- Relatives: Ole Jacob Malm (grandson)
- Awards: Order of St. Olav, Order of Dannebrog, Order of the Polar Star

Ole Olsen Malm (14 March 1854 – 16 May 1917) was a Norwegian physician, veterinarian, civil servant and politician.

== Personal life ==
Malm was born on 14 March 1854 in Stavanger, to tailor Knud Olsen and Bertha Olene Qvie. He changed his name to Malm in 1880. In 1881 he married Thora Otilie Jevnager. He was a grandfather of Ole Jacob Malm.

== Medical career ==
After passing examen artium in 1872, Malm graduated as cand.med. in 1880, as veterinarian in 1889, and dr.med. in 1894. He was assigned medical candidate at Rikshospitalet in 1881, and thereafter appointed as municipal physician, first in Øyer Municipality and later in Sør-Odal Municipality. From 1887 to 1889 he worked and studied in Copenhagen. After graduating as veterinarian in 1889, he worked in Paris for a while, at Institut Pasteur and at École nationale vétérinaire d'Alfort.

He was assigned manager of the Norwegian Veterinary Institute from 1891, and director of the Veterinary Authority in 1894. He was the first in Scandinavia to produce tuberculin, for tuberculosis diagnostics of cattle in 1891, and from 1892 also for humans.

== Political career ==
Taking part in politics, Malm was elected member of the municipality council of Kristiania from 1895 to 1910, and was also elected member of the Storting, representing the Coalition Party. He was an active agitator against voting rights for women. In 1907, when the Storting voted in favour of female suffrage in parliamentary elections, Malm took part in the debate holding a speech ironizing about such female initiatives.

Malm was chairman of the board of Det Norske Pengelotteri, a State lottery, from its start in 1912 to his death. He was also a frequent contributor to the academic journal Tidsskrift for Den Norske Veterinærforening.

== Decorations ==
Malm was decorated Knight, First Class of the Order of St. Olav in 1897, and was a Commander of the Order of Dannebrog, and Commander of the Order of the Polar Star.
