= Stetinden (Narvik) =

Mountain in Narvik, Norway

Stetinden (Norwegian); Stáddá (Lule Sami)
- Historic spelling: Stetind
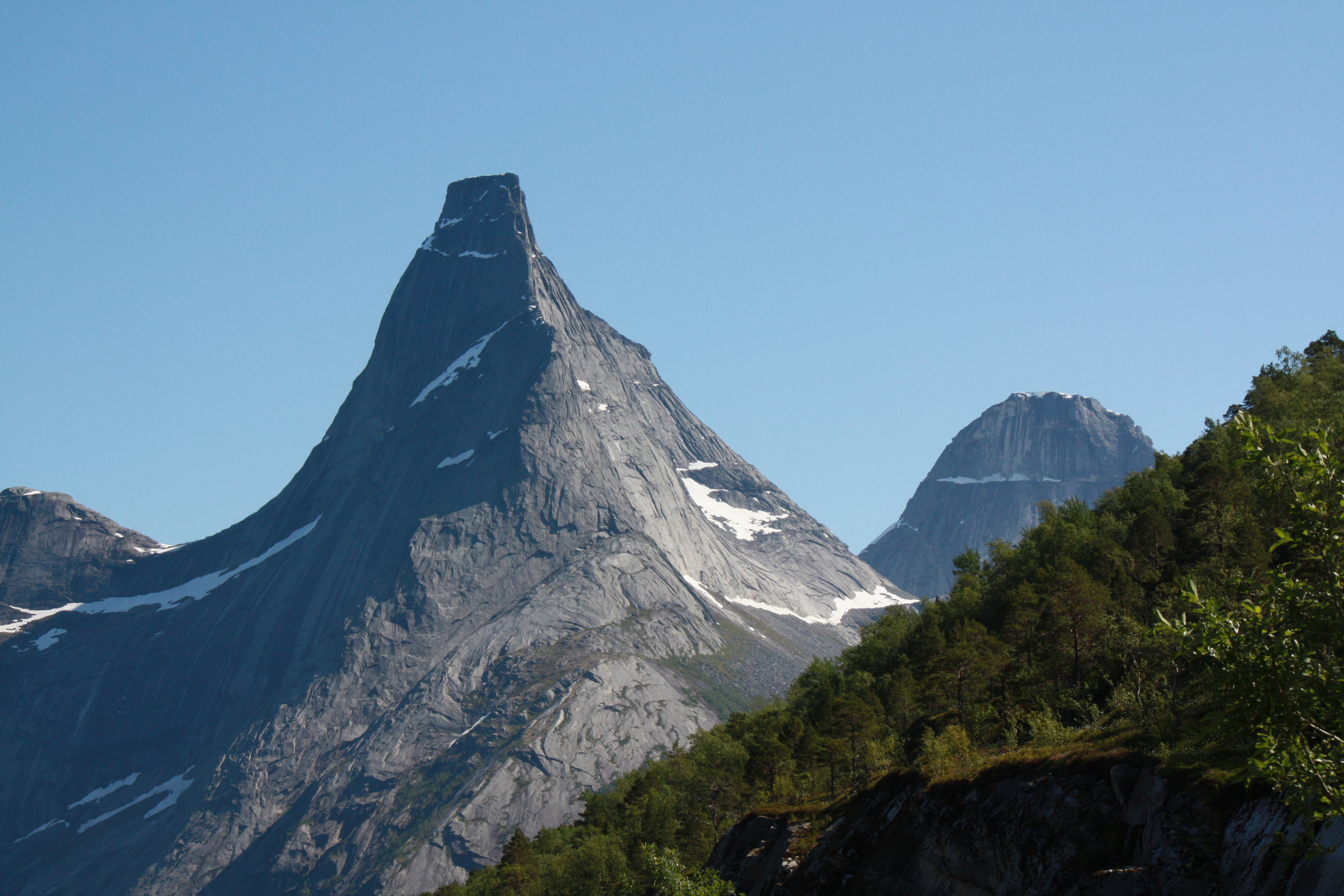
- View of Stetinden in June 2009

Highest point
- Elevation: 1,392 m (4,567 ft)
- Coordinates: 68.1652°N 16.5928°E

Geography
- Interactive map of the mountain
- Location: Nordland, Norway
- Topo map: 1331 III Kjøpsvik

Climbing
- First ascent: 30 July 1910: Ferdinand Schjelderup, Carl Wilhelm Rubenson and Alf Bonnevie Bryn
- Easiest route: Climbing, east wall

Stetinden (Norwegian) or Stáddá (Lule Sami) is a mountain in Narvik Municipality in Nordland county, Norway. It is located about 15 kilometres (9 mi) northeast of the village of Kjøpsvik. The mountain has very smooth sides reaching all the way to the fjord. Stetinden has an obelisk-shape which gives it a very distinct look. In 2002 it was voted to be the "National Mountain" of Norway by listeners of NRK.

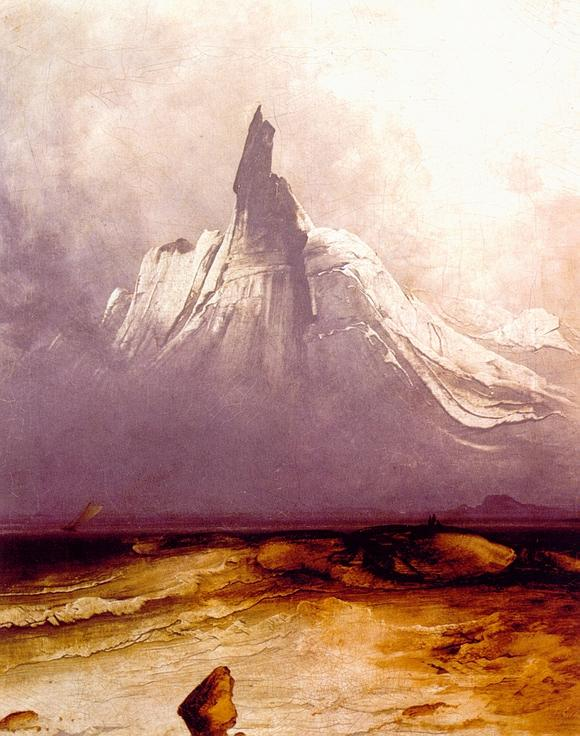
"Stetind i tåke" painted by Peder Balke ca. 1864.

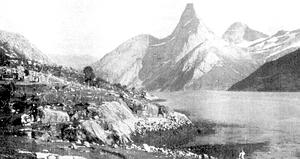
Stetind seen from Stefjordneset. Picture by William Cecil Slingsby, 1915.

The coat of arms of Narvik Municipality is based on the silhouette of this mountain.

== Climbing ==
The mountain had several attempts at first ascents. First was the German Paul Güssfeldt and the Norwegian Martin Ekroll in the summer of 1888. The Dane Carl Hall and the Norwegian mountain guide Mathias Soggemoen attempted in 1889.

Neither group succeeded, but Carl Hall built a cairn on the lower summit about 500 metres (1,600 ft) southeast of the main summit. That cairn is now called Halls fortopp (elevation 1,304 metres or 4,278 feet). In 1904, William Cecil Slingsby also failed to reach the summit.

It was not until 30 July 1910 that Ferdinand Schjelderup, Carl Wilhelm Rubenson, and Alf Bonnevie Bryn finally reached the summit of Stetind. The weather conditions were good. It was Rubenson's 25th birthday, and he was given the honor of being first in the rope. The hardest part was to pass the smooth crag "Mysosten", which Rubenson finger traversed along a tiny crack. After this passage there was an easy climb to the summit. The same three climbers continued their 1910 tour by making first ascents of the Lofoten summits Svolværgeita and Trakta. Arne Næss, Ralph Høibakk, and K. Friis Baasted did the first winter climb of Stetind in 1963 on the eastern wall. In 1966, Arne Næss and four others were the first ones to summit via the west wall.

== Name ==
The shape of the mountain has been compared with a ste which means "anvil" and the last element is the finite form of tind which means "mountain peak". Slingsby characterized Stetind as the ugliest mountain he ever saw.

== Tourism ==
Stetind is not a particularly popular tourist destination, despite being Norway's national mountain. It got a boom in tourism activity after the award, but the number of visitors returned to normal levels after a few years.
