= Ekrollhamna =

Bay in Svalbard

Coordinates: 77.578°N 20.877°E

Ekrollhamna is a small bay at Edgeøya, Svalbard. The bay is named after merchant Martin Hoff Ekroll, and is located north of the bay of Tjuvfjorden. An expedition with the ship Willem Barents stayed in the harbor of Ekrollhamna during the winter of 1894–95.
