= Johan Schreiner =

Norwegian historian (1903–1967)

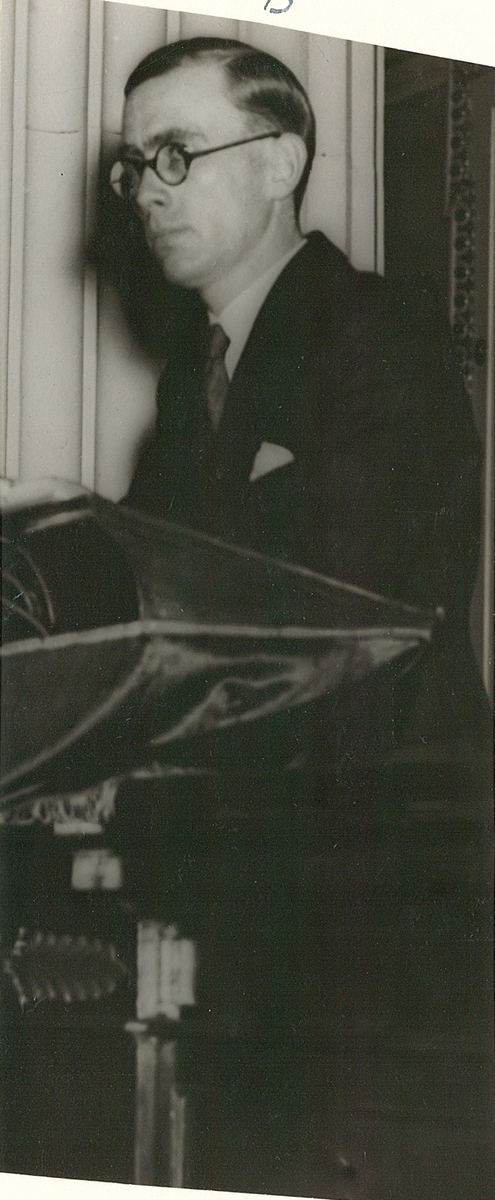
- Johan Schreiner around 1935–1940.
- Born: 25 May 1903; Drøbak
- Died: 8 October 1967 (aged 64)
- Occupation: Historian
- Employer: University of Oslo
- Spouses: Kirsten Hansteen (m. 1928) Astri Høst (m. 1930)
- Parents: Kristian Schreiner (father); Alette Schreiner (mother)
- Relatives: Fredrik Schreiner (brother); Per Schreiner (nephew)
- Awards: Order of St. Olav (1965)

Johan Christian Schreiner (25 May 1903 – 8 October 1967) was a Norwegian historian. He was a professor at the University of Oslo, and his speciality was the Middle Ages.

== Personal life ==
He was born in Drøbak as a son of historian Kristian Schreiner (1874–1957) and physician and anthropologist Alette Schreiner (1873–1951), and grew up in Kristiania. He was married briefly to his youth friend, later editor, Minister of Social Affairs, and member of Parliament Kirsten Hansteen, from 1928, and from 1930 he was married to Astri Høst. While he was a student he was a member of the radical political organization Mot Dag.

Through his brother Fredrik, Johan Schreiner was an uncle of economist and civil servant Per Schreiner.

== Career ==
Schreiner finished his secondary education in 1921, and enrolled at the University of Oslo where he majored in history in 1927. In 1933 he defended his doctorate, over timber export and trade politics in the early 17th century (Nederland og Norge 1625–1650. Trelastutførsel og handelspolitikk). He lectured at the University of Oslo from 1939, and was appointed professor in 1946. Following the outbreak of World War II he was arrested first in February 1942, being incarcerated at Bredtveit concentration camp until March. He was later arrested in October 1943 along with other University faculty. He was incarcerated in Bredtveit concentration camp from October to November 1943, Berg concentration camp from November to December 1943 and Grini concentration camp from December 1943 to December 1944. In 1946 and 1947 he co-edited the two-volume book Griniboken along with August Lange, with contributions from several of the prisoner at Grini. He chaired the society Den norske historiske forening from 1947 to 1955, and edited the society's journal Historisk tidsskrift during the same period. He was main editor of the five volume Trondheim bys historie (1956–1973), and Vårt folks historie (1961–1964).

From 1947 to 1955 he chaired the Norwegian Historical Association. He was decorated as Knight, First Class of the Royal Norwegian Order of St. Olav in 1965.
