= Klokktinden =

Mountain in Nordland, Norway

- Klokketind
- Interactive map of the mountain

Highest point
- Elevation: 863 m (2,831 ft)
- Coordinates: 67.9824°N 13.0864°E

Geography
- Location: Nordland, Norway

Climbing
- First ascent: Alf Bonnevie Bryn and Ferdinand Schjelderup (1910)

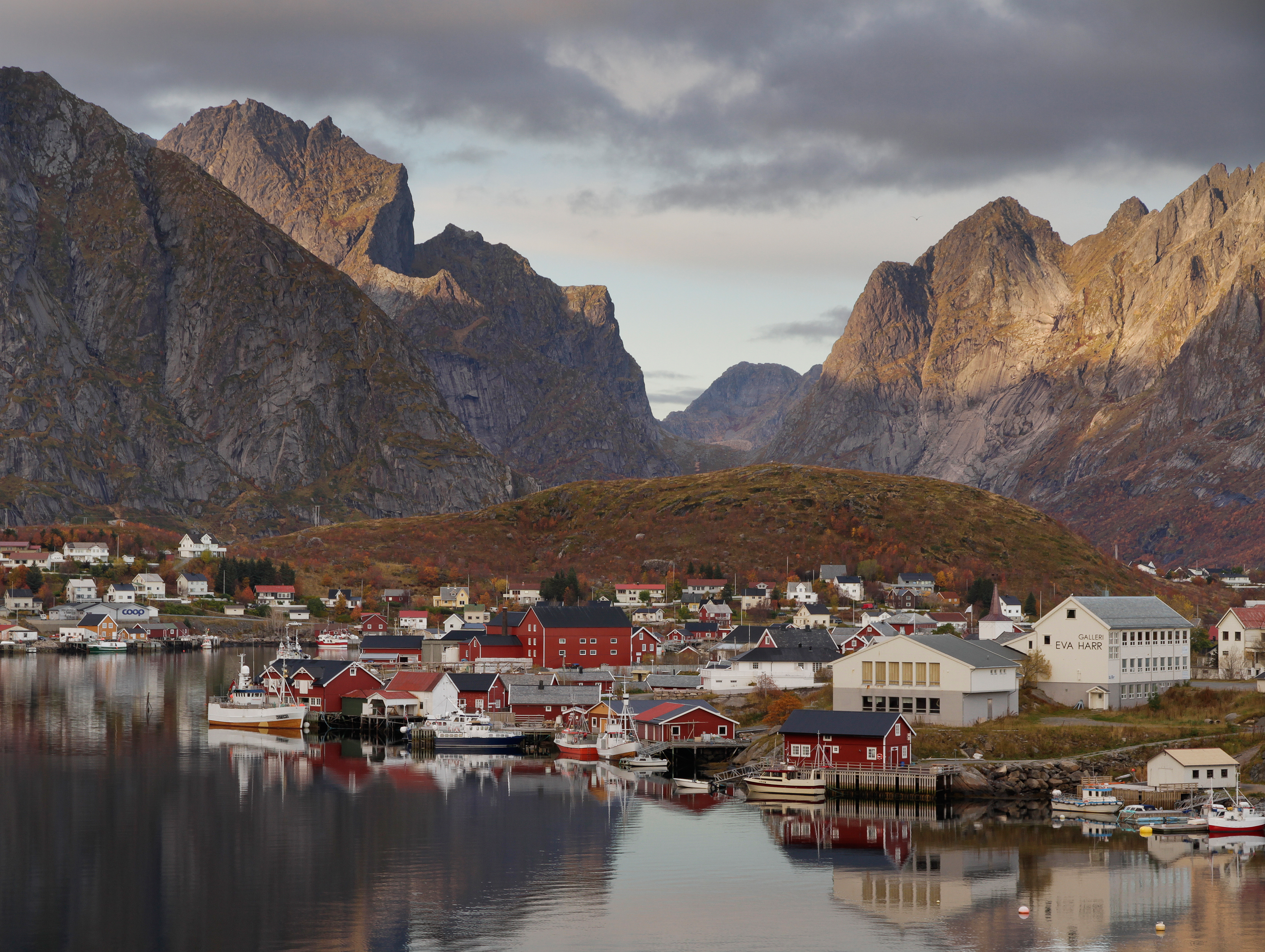
View of Coastal village of Reine in Moskenes, Lototen, Norwa. Klokktinden is the mountain summit to the right

Klokktinden is a mountain in Nordland county, Norway. The 863-metre (2,831 ft) tall mountain is located on the island of Moskenesøya, on the border of Flakstad Municipality and Moskenes Municipality, about 6 kilometres (3.7 mi) north of the village of Reine. The mountain was first ascended in 1910 by Alf Bonnevie Bryn and Ferdinand Schjelderup.
