= Bredo Henrik von Munthe af Morgenstierne Sr. =

Danish-Norwegian jurist

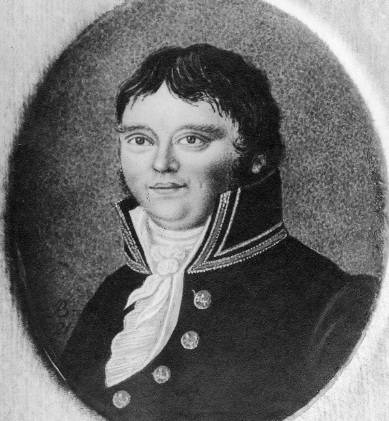
Bredo Henrik Portrait

Bredo Henrik von Munthe af Morgenstierne (27 September 1774 – 3 June 1835) was a Danish-Norwegian jurist who served as the first Attorney General of Norway from 1816 to 1820. He belonged to a Danish and Norwegian noble family.

== Personal life ==
He was born in Denmark as the son of Otto Christopher von Munthe af Morgenstierne and his wife Christine Bodilla Birgitte de Flindt; his grandfather, supreme court justice Bredo von Munthe af Morgenstierne, had been ennobled in Denmark-Norway.

In 1800 he married Cathrine Elisabeth Fries. They had ten children. His son Vilhelm Ludvig Herman became a County Governor, and Christian Fredrik Jacob was a jurist as well as chief of police in Christiania for some time. Through Vilhelm Ludvig Herman he was the grandfather of professor of law Bredo Henrik von Munthe af Morgenstierne and great-grandfather of Norwegian Ambassador to the United States of America, Wilhelm Thorlief von Munthe af Morgenstierne, Dean of the Diplomatic Corp in Washington, DC during World War II and his brother, indologist Georg Valentin von Munthe af Morgenstierne. His daughter Augusta Julie Georgine married Prime Minister Frederik Stang.

== Career ==
Bredo Henrik von Munthe af Morgenstierne took the cand.jur. degree in Copenhagen, and was hired as assessor in Copenhagen city court. In 1802 he was promoted to Supreme Court barrister. He left Denmark in 1804, and travelled around in Europe as a violinist. In 1806 he came to Norway, and originally settled in Moss. When the Gunboat War (1807–1814) broke out, he served in the Norwegian coastal defence, but in 1810 was hired as an attorney. In 1820 he was appointed district stipendiary magistrate (sorenskriver) in Bamble, residing in nearby city of Porsgrund.

Following the 1823 election, Bredo Henrik became a deputy representative to the Norwegian Parliament. Some years earlier he had made his mark as a supporter of King Charles John of Sweden and Norway, who at that time was feuding with Parliament over a proposed Royal veto. After this, Charles John had issued Bredo Henrik a payment of speciedaler, which has been seen as a return of the favor. When meeting in a parliamentary session in 1824, Bredo Henrik was accused of disqualification due to his gift from the King. While originally claiming that he turned down the money, a later letter from Bredo Henrik revealed that he had requested the redirection of the payment to his son. As a result, he lost his place as deputy representative.

The same year, his house in Porsgrund burned down. The fire also consumed the house of his neighbor Jens Gasmann, who by an ironic coincidence had taken over as deputy representative. Bredo Henrik left Porsgrund after the fire, moving to the neighboring city Skien.

In 1829 he left the district stipendiary magistrate post, and moved to Christiania. He worked with three other jurists with a new Criminal Act. He published several periodicals, including Juridisk Maanedstidende, Juridisk Repertorium with Lorentz Lange, Jørgen Herman Vogt and Jonas Anton Hielm, and Juridiske samlinger with Peder Carl Lasson and Claus Winter Hjelm.

He died in 1835 in Christiania.
