= Alfred Jørgen Bryn =

Norwegian patent engineer

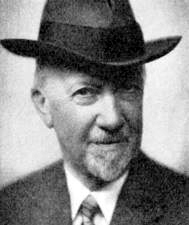
- Born: 29 May 1862; Trondheim, Norway
- Died: 3 August 1937 (aged 75)
- Occupation: Patent engineer
- Children: Alf Bonnevie Bryn
- Relatives: Thomas Bryn (grandfather); Knud Bryn (brother); Halfdan Bryn (brother)

Alfred Jørgen Bryn (29 May 1862 – 3 August 1937) was a Norwegian patent engineer.

== Personal life ==
Bryn was born in Trondheim as the son of Thomas Bryn and Kristine Emilie Karoline Richter. He was a grandson of Constitutional Father Thomas Bryn, a brother of Knud Bryn and Halfdan Bryn, and the father of Alf Bonnevie Bryn.

== Career ==
In 1887, Bryn established the office Bryns Patentbyrå, which he managed for fifty years. Among his publications are Om patenter from 1894, Raadhuset og Piperviks-reguleringen from 1916, Varemerket from 1929, and Retten i oppfinnelser efter norsk lov from 1932.
