= Per Schreiner =

Norwegian economist and civil servant

Per Schreiner (14 July 1932 – 28 October 2005) was a Norwegian economist and civil servant.

== Biography ==
He was born in Oslo as a son of Fredrik Schreiner (1905–1988) and Signy Rønneberg (1903–1983). He was a grandson of Kristian and Alette Schreiner, and a nephew of Johan Schreiner.

After finishing his secondary education in 1950, he enrolled at the University of Oslo. He graduated with the cand.oecon. degree in 1958.

He worked as a researcher and assistant at the University of Oslo, the Centraal Planbureau, and Stanford University in the United States.

In 1963 he was hired as a consultant in the Ministry of Finance. He was quickly promoted to political appointee positions as assistant secretary in 1965 and deputy under-secretary of state in 1971.

From 1989 he was again a consultant, before leaving government in 1992. He spent some time studying at Harvard University and working for the consultant company Econ.

He was also a board member of Pax Forlag. Schreiner died in October 2005 in Oslo.
