= Knud Bryn =

Norwegian engineer and industrialist

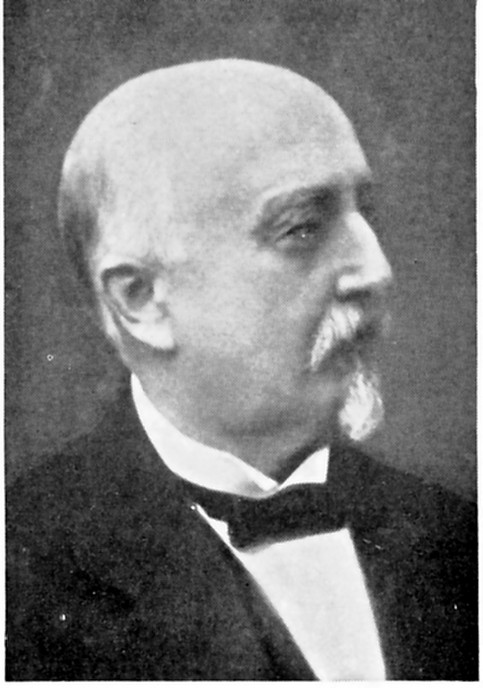
- Born: 15 March 1855; Trondheim, Norway
- Died: 28 May 1941 (aged 86)
- Occupations: Engineer and industrialist
- Relatives: Thomas Bryn (grandfather); Alfred Jørgen Bryn (brother); Halfdan Bryn (brother); Alf Bonnevie Bryn (nephew)
- Awards: Order of St. Olav

Knud Ørn Bryn (15 March 1855 – 28 May 1941) was a Norwegian engineer and industrialist. He was one of the pioneers in the development of modern hydropower plants in Norway.

== Biography ==
Bryn was born in Trondheim, Norway. He was the son of Thomas Bryn (1813-1902) and Kristine Emilie Caroline Richter (1825-1869). He was the brother of anthropologist Halfdan Bryn and engineer Alfred Bryn. Bryn graduated from the Trondheim Technical School (Trondhjems Tekniske Læreanstalt) in 1874 and completed engineering exam at the Technical University of Munich in 1877. He worked first as an engineer at various railway. In 1883, he established the Trondheim Electric Bureau. In 1884, Bryn moved Christiania (now Oslo). In 1886. he was appointed first director of Christiania Telephone Society.

In 1898, he established Hafslund ASA the company which operated the power grid supplying electricity to Oslo. He served as manager of Hafslund until 1928. Bryn was chairman from 1929 to 1936 of AS Tyssefaldene, a power company supplying power to energy-intensive industrial companies in Odda, the main commercial and economic centre of the region of Hardanger.

Bryn was a member of the Norwegian Academy of Science and Letters and of the Royal Swedish Academy of Engineering Sciences. He was decorated Commander with Star of the Order of St. Olav in 1928.
