= Thomas Bryn =

Norwegian politician

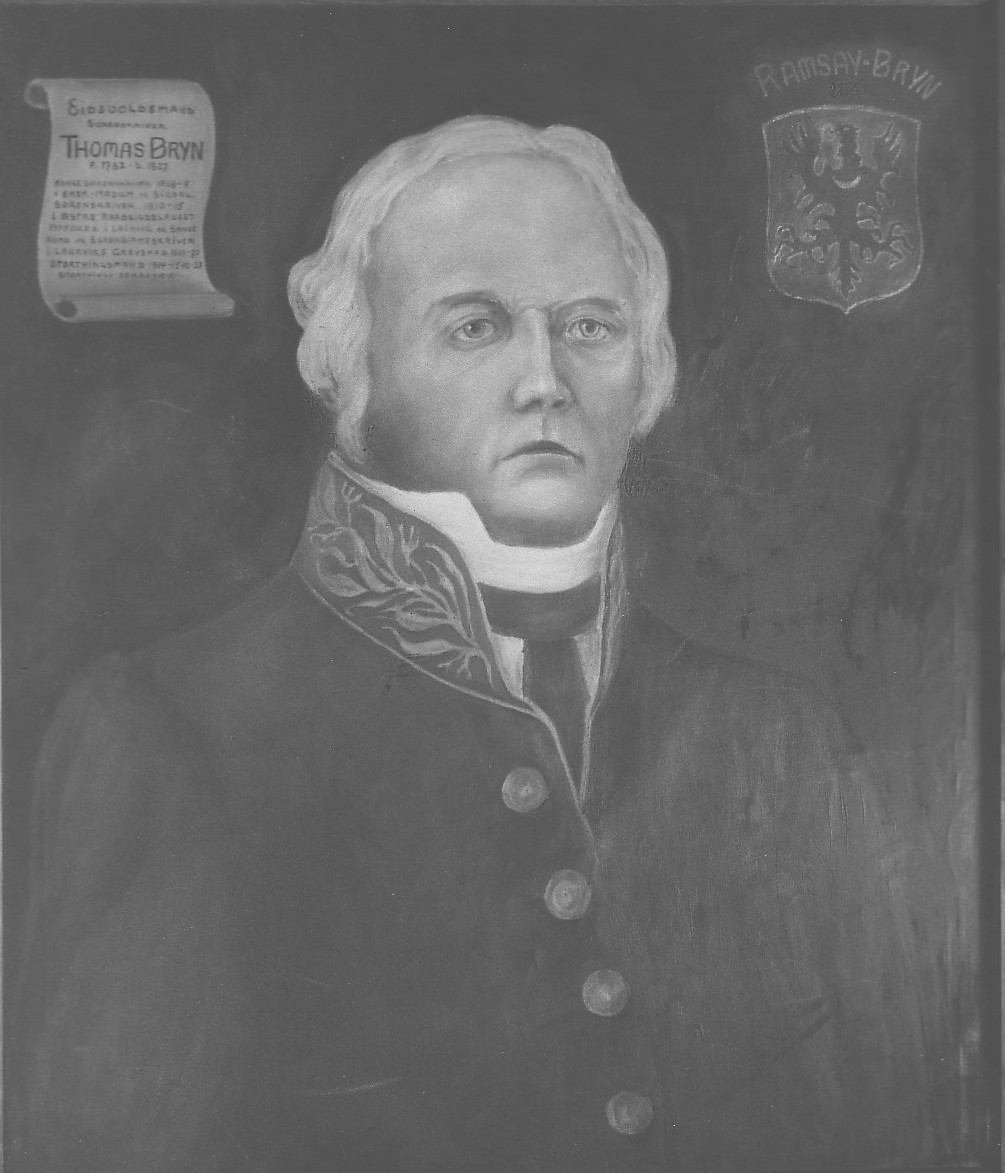
- Born: 29 March 1782; Kongsberg, Norway
- Died: 6 September 1827 (aged 45)
- Occupations: Jurist, magistrate and civil servant
- Known for: Representative at the Norwegian Constitutional Assembly, 1814
- Relatives: Knud Bryn (grandson); Alfred Jørgen Bryn (grandson); Halfdan Bryn (grandson); Alf Bonnevie Bryn (great-grandson)

Thomas Bryn (29 March 1782 – 6 September 1827) was a Norwegian jurist, magistrate and civil servant. He served as a representative at the Norwegian Constitutional Assembly.

Thomas Bryn was born at Kongsberg in Buskerud, Norway. Bryn was the son of Thomas Thomassen Bryn (1756-1830), who was director of mining at the Kongsberg Silver Mines. He first worked as a printer's assistant and later as a clerk in Buskerud. After a few years of service, he travelled to the University of Copenhagen to study law. In 1805, he earned his law degree and returned to Kongsberg. He found some work in the administration of District Governor Herman Wedel Jarlsberg. In 1808, he married Susanne Lind (1783 - 1827). The couple had eight children. The family lived at Klubbgaarden in Larvik and owned the Lunde farm in the Tjølling prestegjeld. In 1810, he was appointed judge in Østre Råbyggelaget. In 1816, he became Magistrate (sorenbirkeskriver) in Larvik.

Thomas Bryn represented Råbyggelaget Amt (now Aust-Agder) at the Norwegian Constituent Assembly in 1814, together with Even Torkildsen Lande and Ole Knudsen Tvedten. At Eidsvoll, he supported the position of the union party (Unionspartiet).

He was elected to the Parliament of Norway in 1814 and 1827. His diary from 1814 was later printed. When Henrik Wergeland was preparing his work on Norway's constitutional history, he came across this diary and used it as one of their sources. It was also used in an impeachment case in 1845.

== Related Reading ==
- Holme Jørn (2014) De kom fra alle kanter - Eidsvollsmennene og deres hus (Oslo: Cappelen Damm) ISBN 978-82-02-44564-5
