= Martin Hoff Ekroll =

Norwegian mountaineer and explorer (1865–1916)

- Born: 16 February 1865; Nordland, Norway
- Died: 15 May 1916 (aged 51)
- Occupations: Merchant; Mountaineer; Arctic explorer
- Known for: First ascent of Vågakallen

Martin Hoff Ekroll (16 February 1865 – 15 May 1916) was a Norwegian merchant, mountaineer and Arctic explorer.

== Biography ==
Ekroll was born on 16 February 1865 in the village of Skroven in the islands of Lofoten in Nordland, Norway. He operated a fishing station at Kabelvåg on the island of Austvågøya. In 1891 he published a plan for an expedition to the North Pole (in German: Plan für eine Schlittenboot-Expedition nach dem Nordpol). He funded and organized an expedition to the island of Edgeøya, located in the Svalbard archipelago 1894–1895. At Edgeøya, the bay of Ekrollhamna and the headland of Martinodden are both named after him. He made a first ascent of the mountain of Vågakallen on the island of Austvågøy about 1885. In 1888 he made a failed attempt of climbing the mountain of Stetind.

Ekroll died on 15 May 1916.
