= Kristian Schreiner =

Norwegian professor of medicine

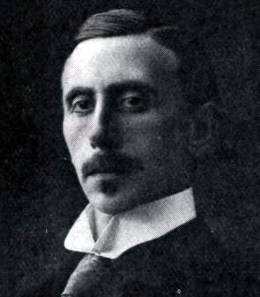
- Born: 29 July 1874; Ekeberg, Norway
- Died: 3 May 1957 (aged 82)
- Spouse: Alette Falch

Academic background
- Thesis: Über die Entwicklung der Amniotennier

Academic work
- Discipline: medicine physical anthropology
- Notable works: Die Somatologie der Norweger nach Untersuchungen an Rekruten

Kristian Schreiner (29 July 1874 – 3 May 1957) was a Norwegian professor of medicine.

He was born in Ekeberg as a son of wholesaler Christian Emil Schreiner and Bethy Gerhardine Bødtker. He was a relative of educator Emil Schreiner. In September 1900 he married Alette Falch. They had a son Johan Schreiner, and through another son Fredrik Schreiner they had the grandson Per Schreiner.

He took his examen artium in 1892 and graduated with the cand.med. degree in 1899. He then studied histology, embryology and cytology for one year in Würzburg, one year in Prague and half a year in Liège. He took the dr.med. degree already in 1902 with the German-language thesis Über die Entwicklung der Amniotennier. He became a research fellow at the Royal Frederick University in 1904, and was promoted to prosector in 1906 and professor in 1908. He conducted research together with his wife, and they released textbooks on the human organism for university students in three volumes between 1918 and 1921, and a textbook for school students in 1923.

Schreiner later became more involved in physical anthropology. In 1929 he released the work Die Somatologie der Norweger nach Untersuchungen an Rekruten together with Halfdan Bryn. However Schreiner did not delve into racial hygiene. He was fired by the Nazi occupants of Norway, and was also imprisoned in Grini concentration camp from September 12, 1941 to July 3, 1942, because of "resistance to a German decree". His son Johan was imprisoned too. After the end of the occupation, Schreiner rounded off his career as professor from spring to autumn 1945. His last book of importance came in 1946: the second volume of Crania Norvegica, the first volume of which came in 1939. He died in May 1957 in Oslo.
