= Litlkorsnestinden =

Mountain in Hadsel, Norway

- Trakta
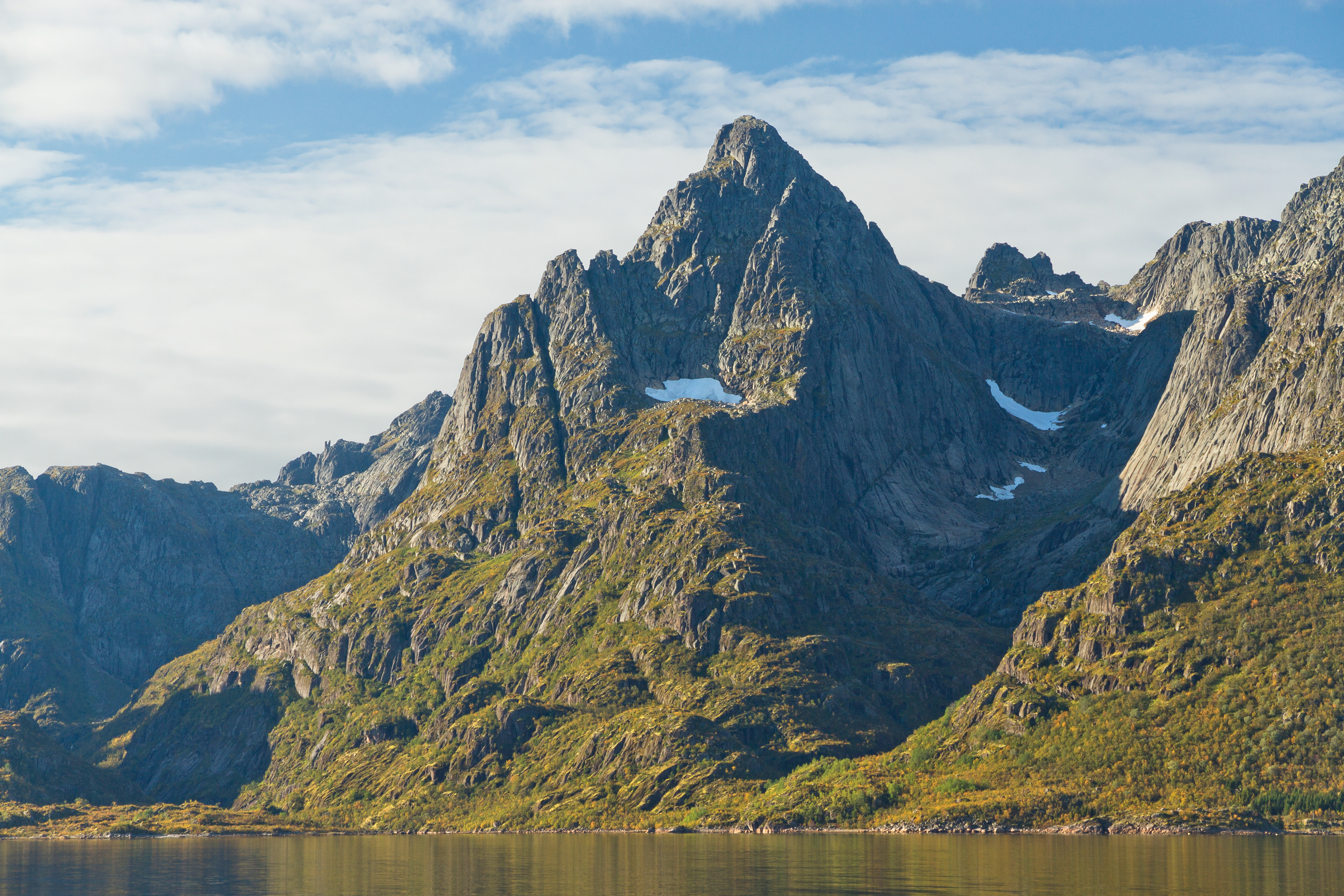

Highest point
- Elevation: 980 m (3,220 ft)
- Coordinates: 68.3364°N 14.8842°E

Geography
- Interactive map of the mountain
- Location: Nordland, Norway
- Parent range: Lofoten

Climbing
- First ascent: 3 August 1910: Bryn, Schjelderup and Rubenson.

Litlkorsnestinden, (nicknamed: Trakta, lit. 'The Funnel') is a mountain in Hadsel Municipality in Nordland county, Norway. The 980-metre (3,220 ft) tall mountain lies on the island of Austvågøya in the Lofoten archipelago, just south of the Trollfjorden. The summit is the most difficult to reach in Norway; there is no trail for the long approach which is often extremely difficult terrain and the easiest route through the Northwest ridge is a mountaineer route graded 3N. It was first ascended in 1910 by Alf Bonnevie Bryn, Ferdinand Schjelderup and Carl Wilhelm Rubenson.

Litlkorsnestinden is regarded as the hardest mountain peak in Norway to ascend, judged by technical difficulty (not length), typically ranged by mountaineers ahead of Stjerntinden in Flakstad, Strandåtinden in Bodø, Reka in Sortland, and Stetinden in Narvik.
