= Lorentz Nitter =

Norwegian physician

Lorentz Henrik Tank Matheson Nitter (27 July 1910 – 17 February 1997) was a Norwegian physician. He was born in Gjøvik. He worked at the Norwegian Radium Hospital from 1953 to 1976, and is particularly known for the Nitter treatment for cancer patients. A street in Gjøvik is named after him.
