= Gunnar Schjelderup =

Norwegian businessman

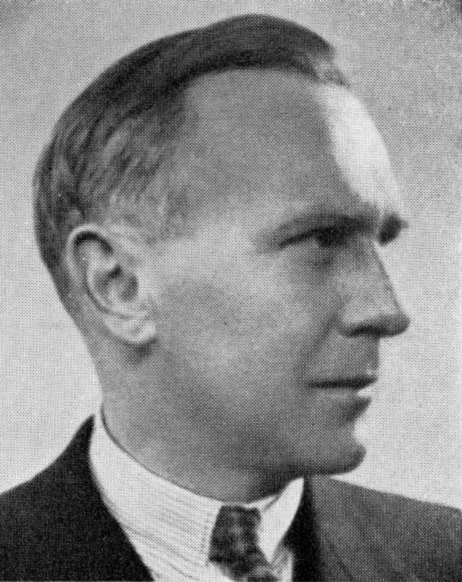
Gunnar Schjelderup

Gunnar Schjelderup (5 April 1895 – 6 March 1972) was a Norwegian businessperson.

== Personal life ==
He was born in Christiania, and was the brother of judge Ferdinand Schjelderup. He was a son of Thorleif Frederik Schjelderup, nephew of Bredo Henrik von Munthe af Morgenstierne and uncle of ski jumper Thorleif Schjelderup.

== Career ==
Gunnar Schjelderup took his education as an engineer in 1917 in Dresden. In 1926 he took over as CEO of iron- and steelware factory Christiania Spigerverk, where his father had been co-owner. He retired in 1961. He had also invested heavily in Bremanger Smelteverk in Svelgen.

In April 1940, following the German invasion of Norway and the Vidkun Quisling coup d'etat, Gunnar Schjelderup and others contacted the Supreme Court to establish a civil administrative council, Administrasjonsrådet, to normalize working life as soon as possible. The council was established a few days after the invasion.
