= Thorleif Frederik Schjelderup =

Norwegian businessman

Thorleif Frederik Schjelderup (7 October 1859 – 27 September 1931) was a Norwegian businessperson.

== Personal life ==
He was born in Christiania as the son of Thorleif Schjelderup and Fredrikke Marie Caspary. His older sister Berte married Bredo Henrik von Munthe af Morgenstierne, son of Vilhelm Ludvig Herman von Munthe af Morgenstierne.

Thorleif Frederik Schjelderup married Inga Berven. Their son Gunnar Schjelderup became a businessperson, while their other son Ferdinand Schjelderup became a judge. Through Ferdinand he was the grandfather of Olympic bronze medal ski jumper Thorleif Schjelderup.

== Career ==
Thorleif Frederik Schjelderup graduated as cand.jur. in 1882, but concentrated on a business career as he in 1884 entered the family company Ludwigsen & Schjelderup. He eventually became the single owner of the company, which was nationally leading in the grain and flour business.

He was also the major shareholder of the forestry and timber company Enso-Gutzeit until 1919, and a co-owner of the iron- and steelware factory Christiania Spigerverk. His son Gunnar took over here in 1926.
