= Fredrik Schreiner =

Norwegian civil servant (1905–1988)

Fredrik Elster Schreiner (27 January 1905 – 11 May 1988) was a Norwegian civil servant.

He was born in Drøbak, and moved to Kristiania at the age of ten. He studied law, and graduated with the cand.jur. degree in 1928. In his youth he was a member of the revolutionary group Mot Dag.

He was hired as a secretary in the National Insurance Administration in 1934. He worked there for one year, and then worked in the Ministry of Justice and for the chief administrative officer of finances in Aker municipality. In 1948 he was hired as the chief administrative officer of communications in Oslo, a position he held until 1973.

He was also involved in a Norwegian development aid project in Kerala, a state in India. This was the first such overseas project that Norway had undertaken. In 1984 Schreiner published the history Oslo Gassverk 1848–1978 (Oslo Gas Works).

== Marriage and family ==
He married Signy Rønneberg (1903–1983) and they had a son Per Schreiner. He became a notable economist and civil servant, reaching the rank of deputy assistant secretary of state.

Schreiner was the son of Kristian and Alette Schreiner. He had a brother, Johan Schreiner.

Fredrik Schreiner died in 1988.
