= Finn Halse =

Norwegian jurist, publisher, translator and writer

- Born: 26 August 1910; Oslo, Norway
- Died: 9 April 1980 (aged 69); Mallorca

Finn Halse (26 August 1910 – 9 April 1980) was a Norwegian jurist, publisher, translator and writer. He was born in Kristiania. He made his literary debut in 1948 with the novel Guden fra Matto Grosso. Halse wrote more the 300 books during his career, and is regarded as the Norwegian writer with the highest number of published books. He wrote westerns, crime novels and erotic novels, published under a variety of pseudonyms. He died in Mallorca in 1980.
