= Lars L'Abée-Lund =

Norwegian police officer and judge (1910–1991)

Lars L'Abée-Lund (22 April 1910 – 17 May 1991) was a Norwegian police officer and judge. He was born in Aker. From 1945 to 1950 L'Abée-Lund was in charge of the department responsible for the Legal purge in Norway after World War II. He served as judge at Eidsivating Court of Appeal from 1968 to 1980. He was decorated Commander of the Swedish Order of Vasa, and Knight, First Class of the Danish Order of the Dannebrog.
