= Torgeir Svendsen =

Norwegian politician

Torgeir Svendsen (1 March 1910 – 22 January 1981), was a Norwegian politician for the Labour Party.

== Biography ==
He served as a deputy representative to the Norwegian Parliament from Østfold during the terms 1954–1957 and 1958–1961.
