= Kitty Petrine Fredriksen =

Norwegian politician

Kitty Petrine Fredriksen (10 January 1910 – 3 March 2003) was a Norwegian politician for the Liberal Party.

She served as a deputy representative to the Norwegian Parliament from Troms during the terms 1945–1949 and 1950–1953.
