= Vågakallen =

Mountain in Nordland, Norway

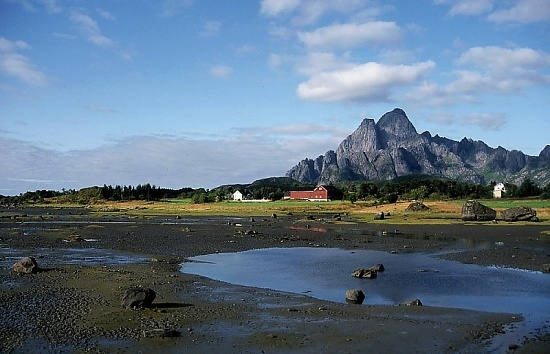
- Vågakallen viewed from near Kabelvåg

Highest point
- Elevation: 943 m (3,094 ft)
- Listing: Mountains of Norway by height
- Coordinates: 68°11′19″N 14°17′48″E

Geography
- Interactive map of the mountain
- Location: Nordland, Norway
- Parent range: Lofoten

Climbing
- First ascent: c. 1885: Martin Hoff Ekroll

Vågakallen is a mountain in Vågan Municipality in Nordland county, Norway. It has a height of about 943 metres (3,094 ft), and is located in the island of Austvågøya in the Lofoten archipelago. The mountain was first ascended by Martin Hoff Ekroll about 1885.
