= Ole Jacob Malm =

Norwegian physician (1910–2005)

- Born: 21 December 1910; Kristiania, Norway
- Died: 31 May 2005 (aged 94)
- Occupation: Physician
- Employers: University of Oslo; Ullevål Hospital
- Known for: Assumed central positions in the resistance movement during the German occupation of Norway, including a period as Secretary General of the Coordination Committee.
- Relatives: Ole Olsen Malm (grandfather)
- Awards: Order of St. Olav (1976)

Ole Jacob Malm (21 December 1910 – 31 May 2005) was a Norwegian physician. He was born in Kristiania, and was a grandson of Ole Olsen Malm. He was professor of medicine at the University of Oslo and senior consultant at Ullevål Hospital in Oslo from 1964 to 1980. During the Occupation of Norway by Nazi Germany he assumed central positions in the resistance movement, including a period as Secretary General of the Coordination Committee. He was decorated Knight, First Class of the Order of St. Olav in 1976.
