= Johan Melander =

Norwegian banker (1910–1989)

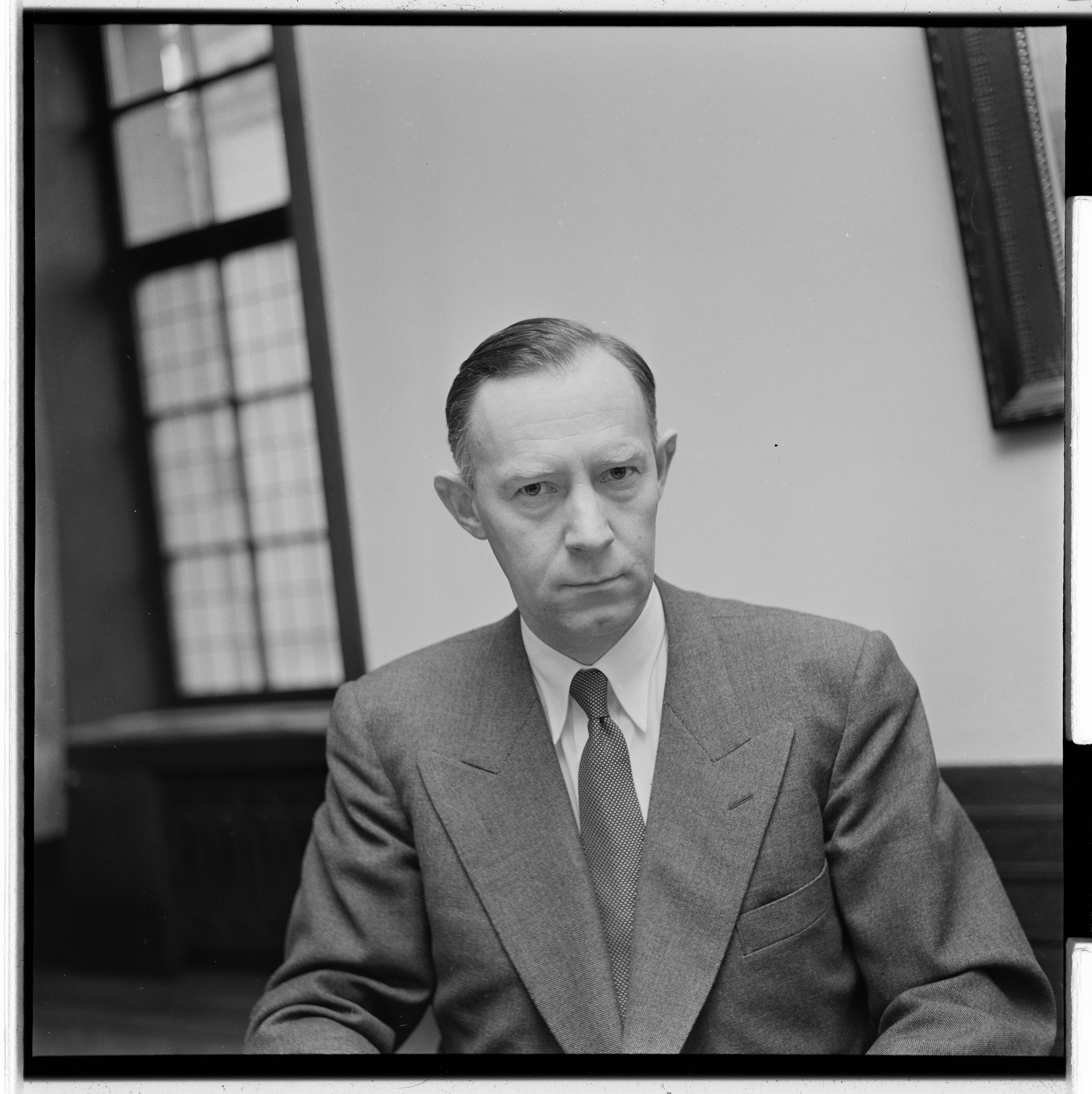
Johan Melander

Johan Arnt Melander (27 April 1910 – 1 December 1989) was a Norwegian banker. He was born in Kristiania. He was CEO of Den norske Creditbank from 1954 to 1980. From 1957 to 1958 he chaired the Organisation for European Economic Cooperation (OEEC) committee that worded the Treaty of the European Free Trade Association. He was decorated Commander of the Order of St. Olav in 1976.
