= Ingrid Schjelderup =

Ingrid Schjelderup may refer to:

- Ingrid Schjelderup (politician) (1932–2022), Norwegian politician
- Ingrid Schjelderup (footballer) (born 1987), Norwegian footballer
