= Asbjørn Lindhjem =

Norwegian politician

Asbjørn Ingvart Klausen Lindhjem (4 February 1910 – 15 November 1994) was a Norwegian politician for the Labour Party.

He was born in Brunlanes Municipality. He served as a deputy representative to the Norwegian Parliament from Vestfold during the term 1969–1973.

Lindhjem held various positions on the municipal council of Brunlanes Municipality from 1959 to 1975. He was a member of Vestfold county council during the term 1971–1975.
