= Bredo Henrik von Munthe af Morgenstierne =

Norwegian jurist

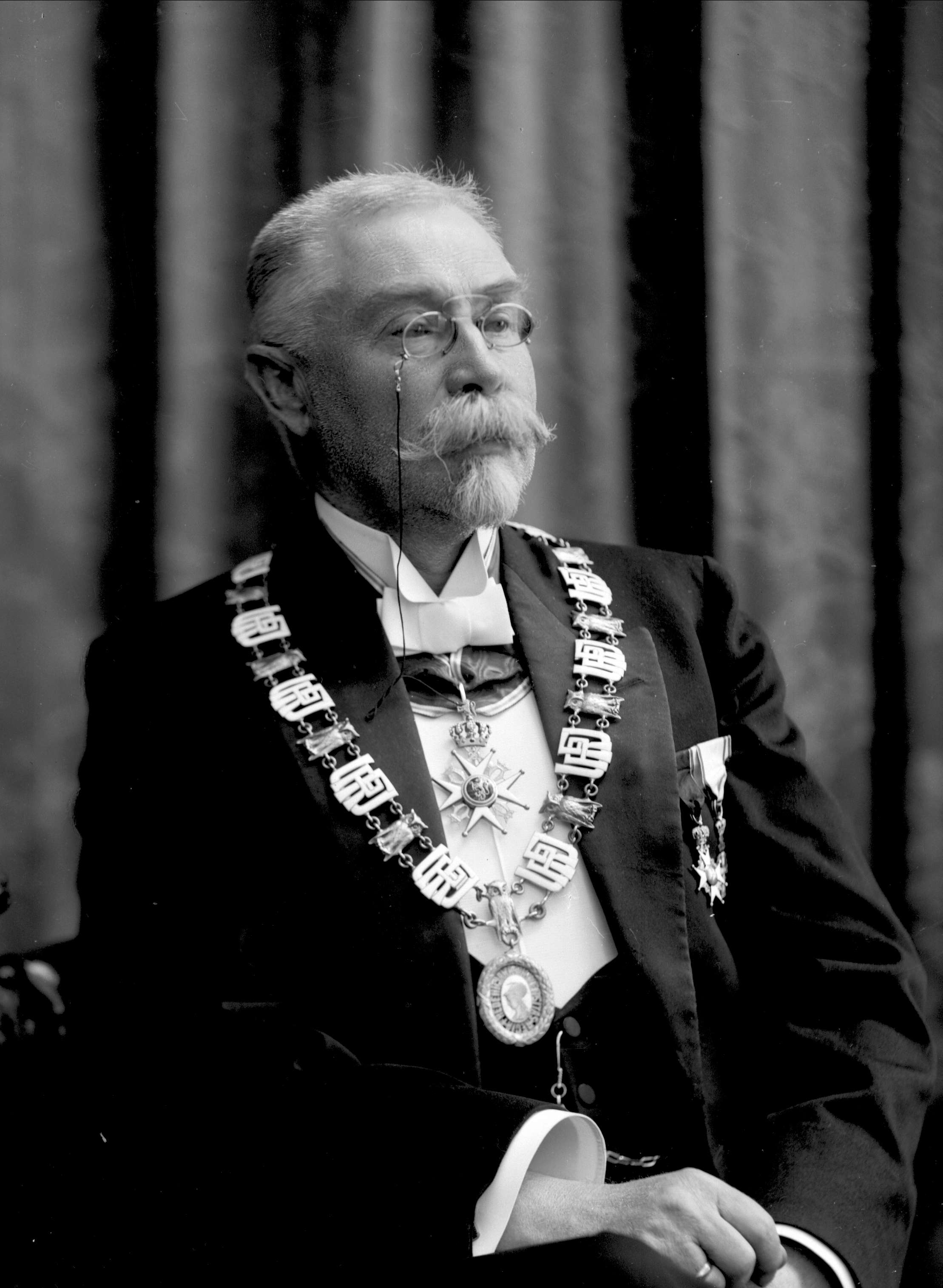
Bredo Henrik von Munthe af Morgenstierne in 1913, photographed by Gustav Borgen

Bredo Henrik von Munthe af Morgenstierne (11 November 1851 – 24 April 1930) was a Norwegian jurist, Professor of Jurisprudence at The Royal Frederick University from 1887, and the university's rector 1912–1918.

== Personal life ==
He was born in Christiania as the son of Vilhelm Ludvig Herman von Munthe af Morgenstierne and his wife Fredrikke Nicoline Wilhelmine N. Sibbern, and was a member of the Munthe af Morgenstierne family, which was ennobled in 1755 by the Dano-Norwegian king. His maternal grandfather was Valentin Christian Wilhelm Sibbern, his paternal grandfather was Bredo Henrik von Munthe af Morgenstierne, Sr., and through his aunt Augusta Julie Georgine he was the nephew of Prime Minister Frederik Stang. His brother Wilhelm Herman Ludvig became a Major General.

Bredo Henrik married Berthe Schjelderup, sister of businessman Thorleif Frederik Schjelderup and aunt of Gunnar and Ferdinand Schjelderup. The couple had three sons and one daughter. His son Otto Christofer (1884–1975) became an attorney, Wilhelm Thorleif (1887–1963) became the Ambassador of Norway to the United States of America earning the position of seniority as Dean of the Diplomatic Corps (married to Marjorie Alder of Winsor, Canada) and Georg Valentin (1892–1978) became a noted Indo-Iranist who undertook pioneering studies in Pashto and associated dialects, Balochi, Kashmiri and the Dardic languages.

== Career ==
Bredo Henrik von Munthe af Morgenstierne made a career as a jurist. He took the dr.juris degree in 1887, and became acting professor at the University of Kristiania the same year. In 1889 the position was made permanent. His principal work was Lærebog i den norske statsforfatningsret, published in 1900. He later became chairman of the Collegium academicum at the University of Kristiania. A personal friend of King Oscar II of Sweden and Norway, in 1905 Morgenstierne was reluctant to acknowledge the dissolution of the union between Norway and Sweden in 1905 on behalf of the university, but soon bowed to the pressure from the rest of the collegium. From 1912 to 1918 he was rector of the Royal Frederick University.

He was also a noted numismatician.

He died in 1930 in Oslo.

Preceded by Waldemar Christofer Brøgger	Rectors of the University of Oslo; 1912–1918	Succeeded by Axel Holst
