= Sverre Marstrander =

Norwegian professor in archaeology

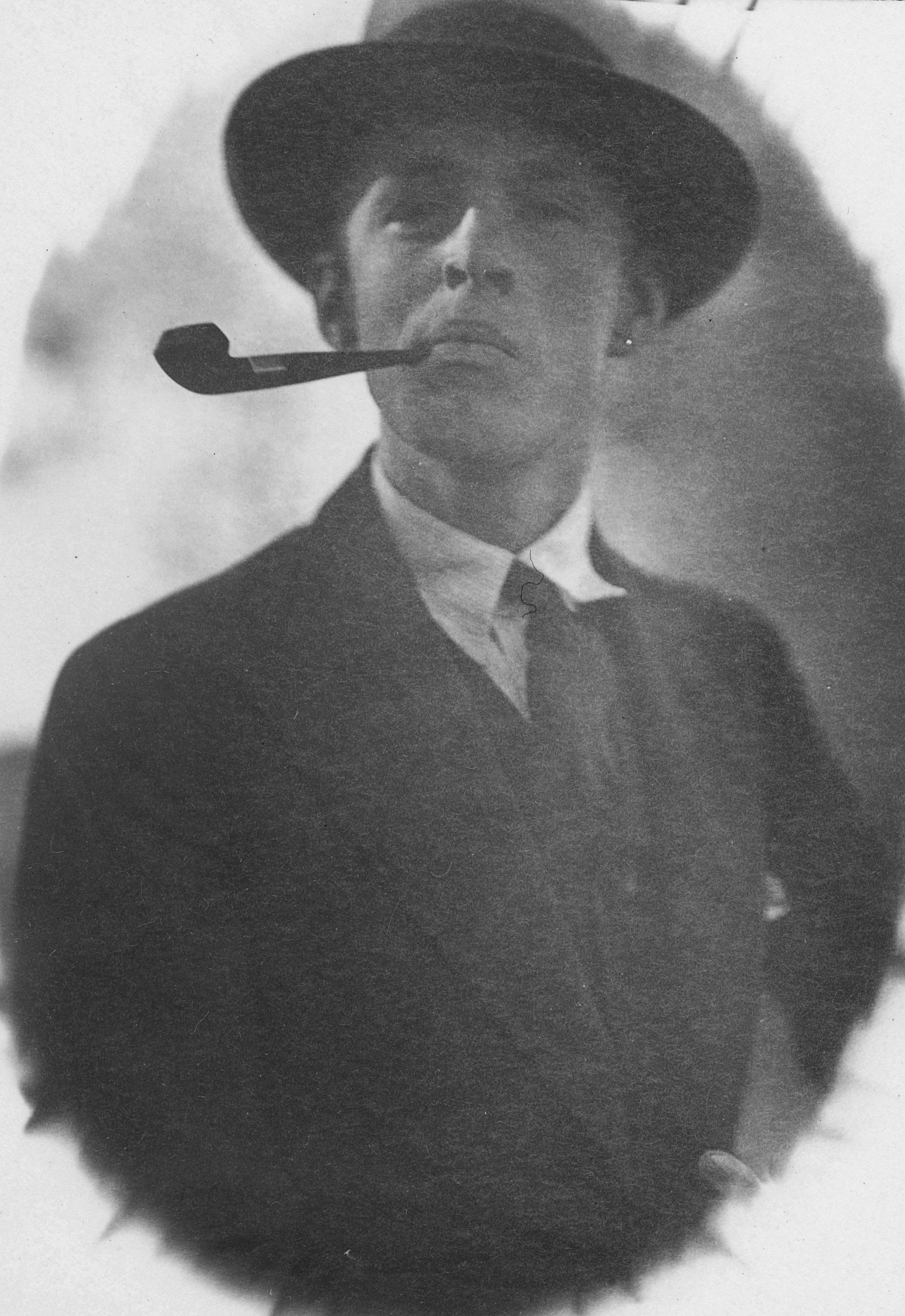
Sverre Marstrander

Sverre Marstrander (24 October 1910 – 20 September 1986) was a Norwegian professor in archaeology.

Marstrander was born in Oslo, Norway. He earned his Magister degree in classical archaeology at the University of Oslo in 1937. He worked with the Royal Norwegian Society of Sciences and Letters at Trondheim (1948–1968). Marstrander became a professor in Nordic archaeology at the University of Oslo in 1968. In that same year he was appointed as the manager of the University of Oslo Museum of National Antiquities (Oldsaksamlingen) and was in the position until 1980. His most important studies were in the research of Norwegian Bronze Age rock carvings, which showed in his dr.philos. dissertation from 1963; Østfolds jordbruksristninger.
