= Fred Schreiner (footballer) =

Luxembourgish footballer

Personal information
- Full name: Alfred Schreiner
- Date of birth: 2 July 1961 (age 65)
- Position: Midfielder

Senior career*
Years	Team	Apps	(Gls)
1982–1986	Red Boys Differdange		
1986–1989	Avenir Beggen		

International career
1983	Luxembourg	2	(0)
- * Club domestic league appearances and goals

Alfred Schreiner (born 2 July 1961) is a retired Luxembourgish football midfielder.
