= Birger Tvedt =

Norwegian physiotherapist

- Born: 1 February 1910; North Shields
- Died: 1 May 2002 (aged 92); Oslo, Norway
- Occupation: Sports medicine
- Spouse: Inger Torgersen
- Honours: Knight of 1st order of St. Olavs

Birger Tvedt (1 February 1910 – 1 May 2002) was a Norwegian sports medical and physiotherapist also known as the "Biggen". He was the son of a deacon Sigvard Andreas Tvedt (1876–1965) and Martha Carens Kruse (1882-1966) and married to physical therapist Inger Torgersen (b. 1924). He was nephew to the pastor Just Kruse (1886–1962), and cousin to Colonel Erling O. Kruse (b. 1922) and physiotherapists Astrid E. Kruse Andersen (b. 1926).

Tvedt grew up in Bergen, Norway, and after the completion of examen artium in 1930, he went to Germany and was trained as a physiotherapist. He then studied medicine at the University of Oslo, and was MD in 1942. After the fire in University Hall in November 1943, he fled to Sweden and came to Uppsala. There he worked for a period as a doctor for Norwegian refugees and he got to work for a sports and work physiologist, Professor Torgny Sjöstrand.

After the Second World War, sports and work physiology was his main interest. He was a doctor for the Norwegian athletes at several world championships and Olympic Games. As a sports physician, his caught interest in strain disorders, and put a lot of effort into such problems.

In 1946 he was connected to the Oslo Orthopedic Institute as a teacher and was later education leader until the state took over the institute in 1966 and called it the Norwegian School of Physiotherapy. He ran the department together with Dr. Otto Holmboe until Holmboe's death. Then he was responsible for the main teaching of Norwegian physiotherapists. As a teacher Tvedt was a pioneer who used very unorthodox methods of teaching. It meant that he was controversial, but his strong point was never drawn into question.

As a physiotherapist, his mantra was motion. Under the leadership of Tvedt, people in various professions was filmed, then the employees together with Tvedt studied the video to learn how to see how they could improve their working position. When Erling Stordahl started his health sports center at Beitostølen, Tvedt was in place as an active consultant. The Director of Health Karl Evang was of the opinion that Tvedt with his ideas about physical activity was 20 to 30 years ahead of its time. Tvedt was for years associated with the Police Academy and was an active promoter of Norwegian police officers' physical education. He was also special medic for many years at the Oslo Police District's occupational health.

== Honours ==
- Knight of 1st order of St. Olav's in 1990
- Æresmedlem av Norwegian Physiotherapist Association

== Bibliography (in selection) ==
- Hygiene og idrett, i Til Tyskland for freden, håndbok for Tysklandsbrigaden, 1947
- Helsekurs, 1960 (2. utg. 1969)
- Arbeidsstudier, bd. 1 (sm.m. B. Harestad), 1969
- Translation: Zebroff, K.: Yoga for everybody, 1974
