= Alette Schreiner =

Norwegian researcher

Alette Schreiner, née Falch (18 May 1873 – 26 December 1951) was a Norwegian researcher.

== Personal life ==
She was born in Christiania as a daughter of district stipendiary magistrate Ingvald Falch (1825–1909) and Alette Louise Aubert (1850–1916). She was a great-granddaughter of Benoni Aubert. Falch grew up in Eidsvoll. Her brother Ingvald Falch, Jr. (1884–1962) followed their father in becoming a district stipendiary magistrate.

== Marriage and family ==
In September 1900 Falch married Kristian Schreiner, a civil servant. Their son Johan Schreiner became a noted historian.

Their son Fredrik Schreiner became a civil servant. His son Per Schreiner became an economist and civil servant.

== Career ==
She took her examen artium at Ragna Nielsens skole in 1892 and graduated with the cand.med. degree in 1899. She was also an intern at the hospital Rikshospitalet in 1900, before studying children's and women's illnesses abroad. She was never hired in an academic position, but conducted research together with her husband, who was a professor. They released textbooks on the human organism for university students in three volumes between 1918 and 1921, and a textbook for school students in 1923. Her most read book was Slegtslivet hos menneskene.

In the 1920s the couple became more involved in physical anthropology. She released Antropologische Studien an norwegische Frauen in 1924, Die Nord-Norweger. Anthropologische Untersuchungen an Soldaten in 1929 and two books under the moniker Anthropologische Lokaluntersuchungen in 1930 and 1932. Neither of them delved into the Nazi type of racial hygiene. Her husband and son were even imprisoned by Nazis in Grini concentration camp. However, Alette Schreiner held that all races contained elements with unsatisfactory genetics.

Schreiner also helped establishing Blindern studenthjem, the sole students' dormitory at Blindern. She died in December 1951 in Oslo.
