= Odd Granlund =

Norwegian broadcasting person

- Born: 15 February 1910; Bergen
- Died: 2 September 1982 (aged 72)
- Occupation: Broadcasting person
- Employer: Norwegian Broadcasting Corporation

Odd Granlund (15 February 1910 – 2 September 1982) was a Norwegian broadcasting person. He was born in Bergen. He was a central person in the early development of television in Norway. He served as administrative manager of the Norwegian Broadcasting Corporation from 1963 to 1980.
