= Finn Brudevold =

Norwegian-American odontologist and educator

- Born: 12 June 1910; Gjøvik, Norway
- Died: 16 January 2006 (aged 95)
- Occupation: Odontologist

Finn Brudevold (12 June 1910 – 16 January 2006) was a Norwegian-American odontologist and educator. He was most known for his research on the application of fluorine for tooth protection.

== Biography ==
Finn Brudevold was born at Gjøvik in Oppland, Norway. He was the son of Peder Amalius Brudevold (1879–1972) and Ingrid Haugom Brudevold (1879–1965). Brudevold was educated at the Norwegian Dental School (Norges Tannlegehøyskole). After his dental examination in Oslo in 1932, he began working as a dentist in private practice. He continued his education at the University of Minnesota School of Dentistry, and took his dental exam in 1940. Brudevold received a Carnegie Fellowship at Rochester School of Medicine and Dentistry at the University of Rochester in 1941.

Brudevold started his academic career as an instructor at Tufts College Dental School in 1945, where he first was an instructor and then assistant professor until 1949. He later served as professor at the Harvard University School of Dental Medicine. Brudevold was chief of preventive dentistry at the department of inorganic chemistry at The Forsyth Institute from 1968 until he retired in 1986. Brudevold published a total of more than 200 scientific works. He was the recipient of numerous awards and served as president of the International Association of Dental Research (1978–1979).

== Selected works ==
- Acid-Reducing Effect of "Antienzymes" in the Mouth (Journal of the American Dental Association, January 1955, 50(1): 18–22)
- A Basic Study of the Chewing Forces of a Denture Wearer (Journal of the American Dental Association, July 1951, 43(1): 45–51)
- Comparative Study of a Fluoride Dentifrice Containing Soluble Phosphate and a Calcium-Free Abrasive (Journal of the American Dental Association, April 1966, 72(4): 889–894)
- Enamel Solubility Tests and Their Significance in Regard to Dental Caries (Annals of the New York Academy of Sciences, December 1968, 153: 20–51)
