= Norsk Tindeklub =

Norwegian mountaineering association

- Formation: 10 April 1908; 118 years ago
- Founded at: Oslo, Norway
- Website: ntk.no

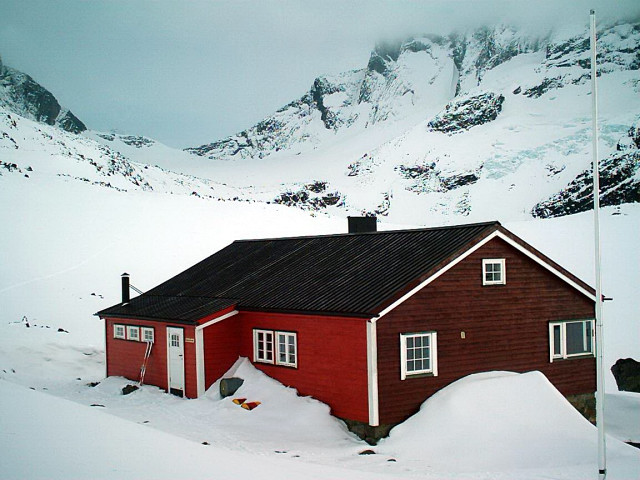
Norsk Tindeclub's cabin in Skagadalen, Hurrungane

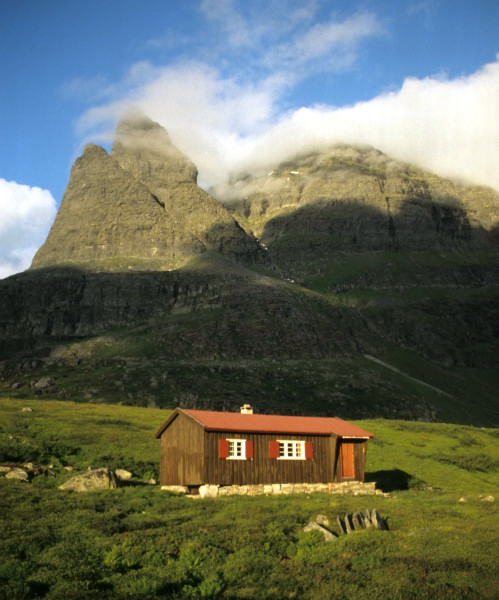
Giklingdalshytta below Innerdalstårnet.

Norsk Tindeklub (Norwegian Alpine Club) is a Norwegian mountaineering association. The club was founded in 1908. The association issues climbing guides and mountaineering books. The club has issued several jubilee books in the series Norsk Fjellsport (1914, 1933, 1948, 1958, 1968, 1983, 1998, 2008). The club has three cabins, in Skagadalen (Hurrungane), Vengedalen (Romsdalen) and Flatvaddalen (Innerdalen).

The third oldest alpine club worldwide and modelled after the British Alpine Club, Norsk Tindeklub is a closed club for experienced mountaineers with requirements for a list of ascents and recommendations. Over time, active efforts have been initiated to promote safety and ethics in climbing, and the club has also been an important contributor to various expeditions. The club is also active in geographical conservation work (e.g., Innerdalen 1973), and it was involved in founding the Norwegian Mountain Museum (Lom 1991).

Since the 19th century prominent British mountaineers such as William Cecil Slingsby—also known for his book Norway, the Northern Playground—had put Norway on the map as a premier mountaineering destination. Around the turn of the century a new generation of young Norwegian mountaineers appeared, and they would form the backbone of the mountaineering community that established Norsk Tindeklub:

When George Paus and Eilert Sundt, respectively 16 and 18 years old, arrived at Turtagrø in 1899, it marked the beginning of a new era for Norwegian mountaineering. [...] In the following years, numerous young mountaineering enthusiasts appeared at Turtagrø – the generation that would form the backbone of the mountaineering community in the coming decades, and who founded Norsk Tindeklub

— Jan Aaasgaard, Jotunheimen
