= Ferdinand Schjelderup =

Norwegian mountain climber

Ferdinand Schjelderup (8 March 1886 – 30 July 1955) was a Norwegian mountaineer, Supreme Court Justice and resistance member during the German occupation of Norway.

== Personal life ==
He was born in Kristiania as the son of Thorleif Frederik Schjelderup and Inga Berven. He was the brother of Gunnar Schjelderup, and through his aunt Berte, Ferdinand was a nephew of Bredo Henrik von Munthe af Morgenstierne.

In 1914, he married Marie Leigh Vogt, daughter of Paul Benjamin Vogt and his wife Andrea Heyerdahl and granddaughter of Niels Petersen Vogt. They had three children, the most famous being their son Thorleif Schjelderup, born 1920, who became a well-known ski jumper, with an Olympic bronze medal from 1948. He married American singer Anne Brown. Their two daughters were Liv and Daisy, educated respectively as medical doctor and architect. Daisy Schelderup also worked as a translator and was active in the anti-nuclear movement.

== Jurist and resistance member ==
He worked as a Supreme Court lawyer from 1916, and a Supreme Court Justice from 1928 to 1952, except for the period between December 1940 and May 1945, during the German occupation of Norway. He became a member of the Norwegian Association for Women's Rights in 1936.

The new Nazi authorities found him to be the most objectionable among the Supreme Court Justices, as Schjelderup at one occasion had insulted a picture of Vidkun Quisling. As the Supreme Court Justices collectively laid down their posts in December 1940, Schjelderup emerged as one of the most prominent members of the Norwegian civil resistance. According to historians, this was "completely unexpected". With his influence over Paal Berg, the Chief Justice of the Supreme Court before 1940, Schjelderup recruited Berg to the inner circle Kretsen in 1941, which had direct contact with the Norwegian government-in-exile in London. He was also in contact with the Norwegian legation in Stockholm, through secretary Jens Boyesen. Schjelderup was later the messenger between Kretsen and the so-called Coordination Committee in the Norwegian resistance. In addition, he attended meetings in the secret military organisation Milorg. In 1943 he personally wrote the letter Partisanbrevet, addressed from Kretsen to the Norwegian government-in-exile. In it, Kretsen advocated weaponless resistance, fearing that Milorg might compromise the entire resistance movement if they were to conduct a broader military uprising. This fear of possible failure was partially caused by the harsh Nazi crackdowns at Majavatn and Telavåg. However, the letter helped clear mutual misunderstandings about command lines in Kretsen and Milorg, which in turn spurred the cooperation between the two organisations, initiated in 1943 and known as Hjemmefrontens Ledelse. Approaching the winter of 1944, Schjelderup was no longer safe in Norway. He fled to Sweden.

After the end of the War, he published three books called Fra Norges kamp for retten. 1940 i Høyesterett (1945), På bred front 1941–42 (1947) and Over bakkekammen 1943–44 (1949). These are viewed as valuable contributions to Norwegian occupational history.

== Mountaineer ==
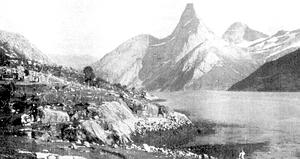
Stetind in 1915.

Ferdinand Schjelderup was among the founders of the mountaineering society Norsk Tindeklub in 1908. He served as its chairman from 1915 to 1916. Norway is a mountainous country, and during this time tourism and expeditions were becoming more widespread.

Ferdinand Schjelderup was among the first ascenders of several mountains. In the summer of 1910 he and his companions conducted first ascendancies of several mountains of Nordland county: Stedtinden, Svolværgjeita, Store Rørhopstinden, Navern, Klokketind and Festhæltind, as chronicled in an article in the book Norsk Fjeldsport 1914.
