= Frank Hughes =

Frank Hughes may refer to:

- Frank Hughes (artist) (1905–1987), British artist
- Frank Hughes (runner) (1908–?), Canadian long-distance runner
- Frank Hughes (footballer, born 1894) (1894–1978), nicknamed Checker, Australian rules footballer
- Frank Hughes (footballer, born 1909) (1909–2002), Australian rules footballer
- Frank Hughes (ice hockey) (born 1949), Canadian ice hockey player
- Frank Hughes (sport shooter) (1881–1942), American sport shooter
- Frank Hughes Jr. (1921–2008), Australian rules footballer
- Frank E. Hughes (1893–1947), American set decorator
- Frank John Hughes (born 1967), American actor
- Frank Joseph Hughes (1883–1967), Canadian lawyer
- Frank Hughes College, Clifton, Tennessee

== See also ==
- Francis Hughes (1956–1981), volunteer in the IRA who died in the 1981 Irish hunger strike
- Francis Wade Hughes (1817–1885), Pennsylvania lawyer and politician
