= Lowinsky =

Lowinsky is a surname. Notable people with the surname include:

- Christophe Lowinsky (born 1992), Martiniquais footballer
- Edward Lowinsky (1908–1985), American musicologist
- Ruth Lowinsky (1893–1958), English society hostess and food writer
- Thomas Esmond Lowinsky (1892–1947), English painter

== Other ==
- Lowinsky (band), Italian rock band
