= Harald Sund =

Norwegian architect and artist

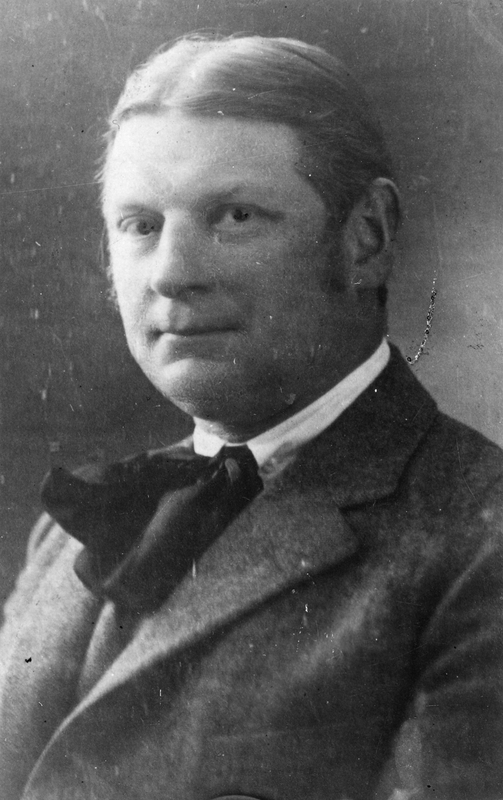
- Harald Sund c. 1920
- Born: February 16, 1876; Gildeskål, Norway
- Died: April 9, 1940 (aged 64); Oslo, Norway
- Occupation: Architect
- Buildings: Fredrikstad Library (1922) Majorstuen Church (1926)

Harald Thorbjørn Sund (February 16, 1876 – April 9, 1940) was a Norwegian architect, artist and illustrator.

== Architectural career ==
Sund was born at Sund in Gildeskål Municipality in Nordland county, Norway. Sund studied architectural engineering at Trondheim Technical College (Trondhjems Tekniske Læreanstalt), graduating in 1897. He studied architecture while traveling through Italy, Belgium and France. He followed with 16 years of study and work in England. From 1916 until from 1937, he established himself as an architect in Kristiania (now Oslo).

In collaboration with August Nielsen, the architect and head of planning in Aker Municipality, he designed a number of churches and other buildings throughout Norway during the first years of the 1900s. Among their works were Majorstuen Church (Majorstuen kirke) which was designed in the style of Classicism with influences of art deco and neo-baroque (1926). Among other things, they were invited to draw up plans for district housing and won the competition for the Fredrikstad Library (Fredrikstad bibliotek).

Harald Sund is considered to have been Northern Norway's foremost church and church restoration architect of the 1920s and 1930s. In his report to the Ministry of Church and Education on the inauguration of Rotsund Chapel in 1932, Bishop Eivind Berggrav enthusiastically wrote the following: "The architect Sund has here once again created a church that gives him much honor and the church great joy."

== Artistic career ==
He married the English painter Renée Emilee Pauline Finch in London during 1913. Sund was also a painter and with Renée was a founding member of the London Group along with Walter Sickert, Robert Bevan, and Harold Gilman. The couple also exhibited at the Royal Academy of Arts, New English Art Club, Brighton Museum & Art Gallery and at the Camden Town Group show called "English Post-Impressionists, Cubists and Others." This included experimental work by Jacob Epstein, Wyndham Lewis, and others that shocked many that saw the exhibition, which ran from December 16, 1913 to January 14, 1914. Although none of the experimental work sold, the more conventional work by Sund and Finch did find buyers. Sund also illustrated books; notably, Ravenna, a Study by Edward Hutton (1913) and The Charm of Venice by Alfred H. Hyatt (1908). At the outbreak of the First World War, he and his wife moved to Norway, where he concentrated on his architectural career.

== Selected works ==
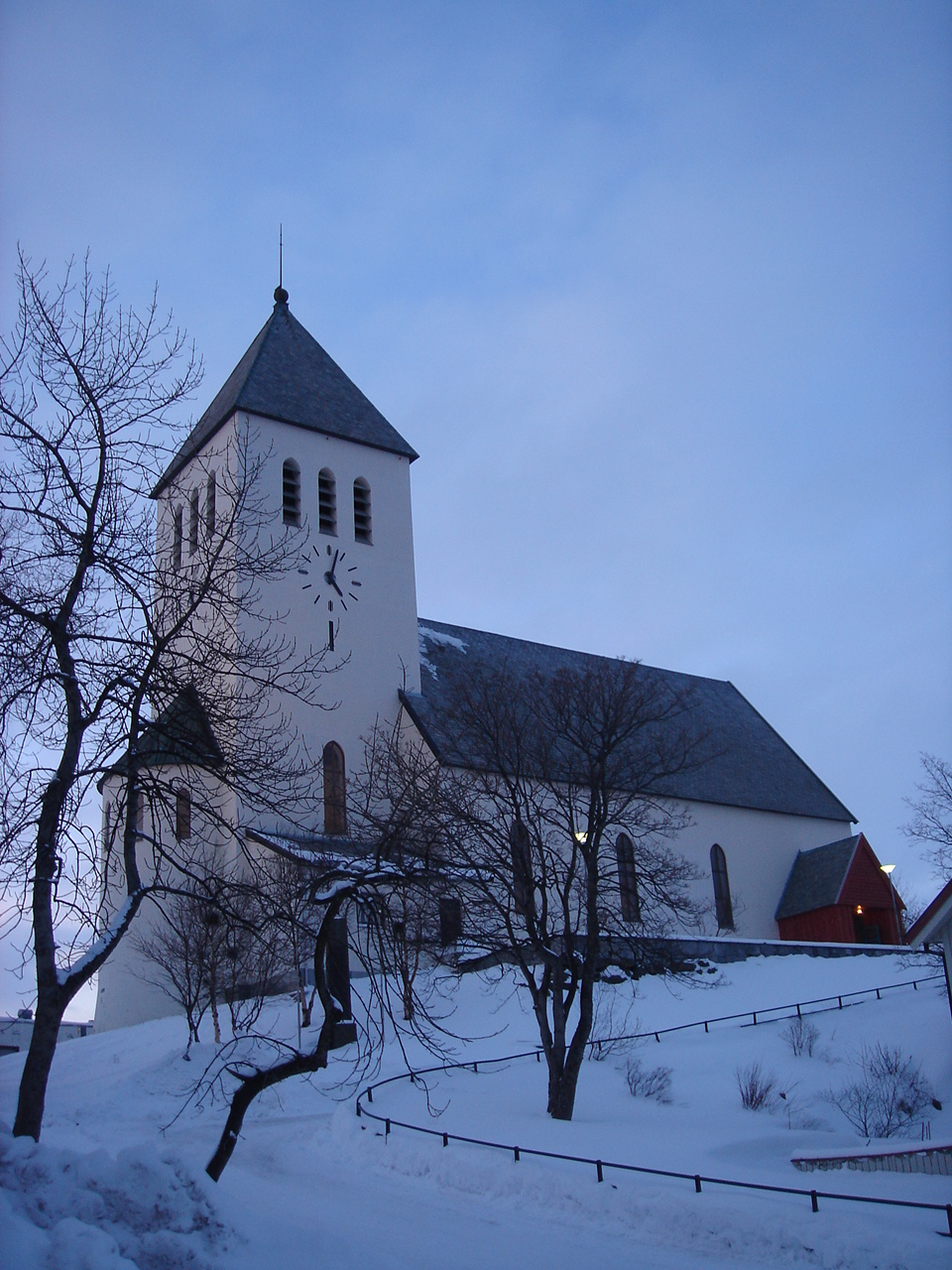
Svolvær Church

- Fredrikstad Library (Fredrikstad Municipality, 1922, protected)
- Kroer Church (Ås Municipality, 1925)
- Majorstuen Church (Oslo, 1926/1933)
- Melbu Church (Melbu, Hadsel Municipality, 1938)
- Rotsund Chapel (Nordreisa Municipality, 1932)
- Sigerfjord Church (Sigerfjord, 1933)
- Skiptvet Church (Skiptvet Municipality, 1937)
- St. Dominic Church and Monastery (Oslo, 1927)
- Svanvik Church (Sør-Varanger Municipality, 1934)
- Svolvær Church (Vågan Municipality, 1934)

== Gallery ==
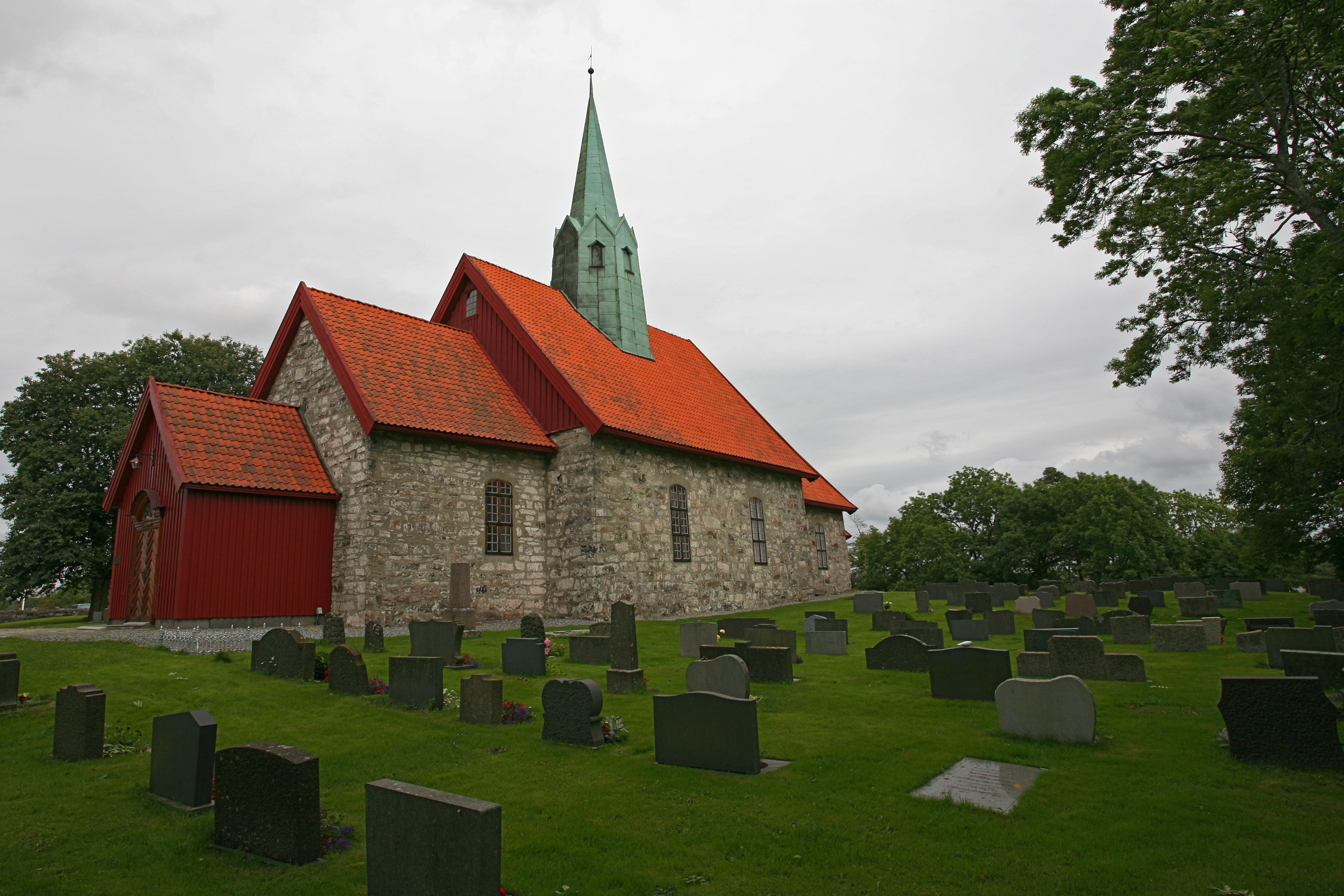
Skiptvet Church in Østfold

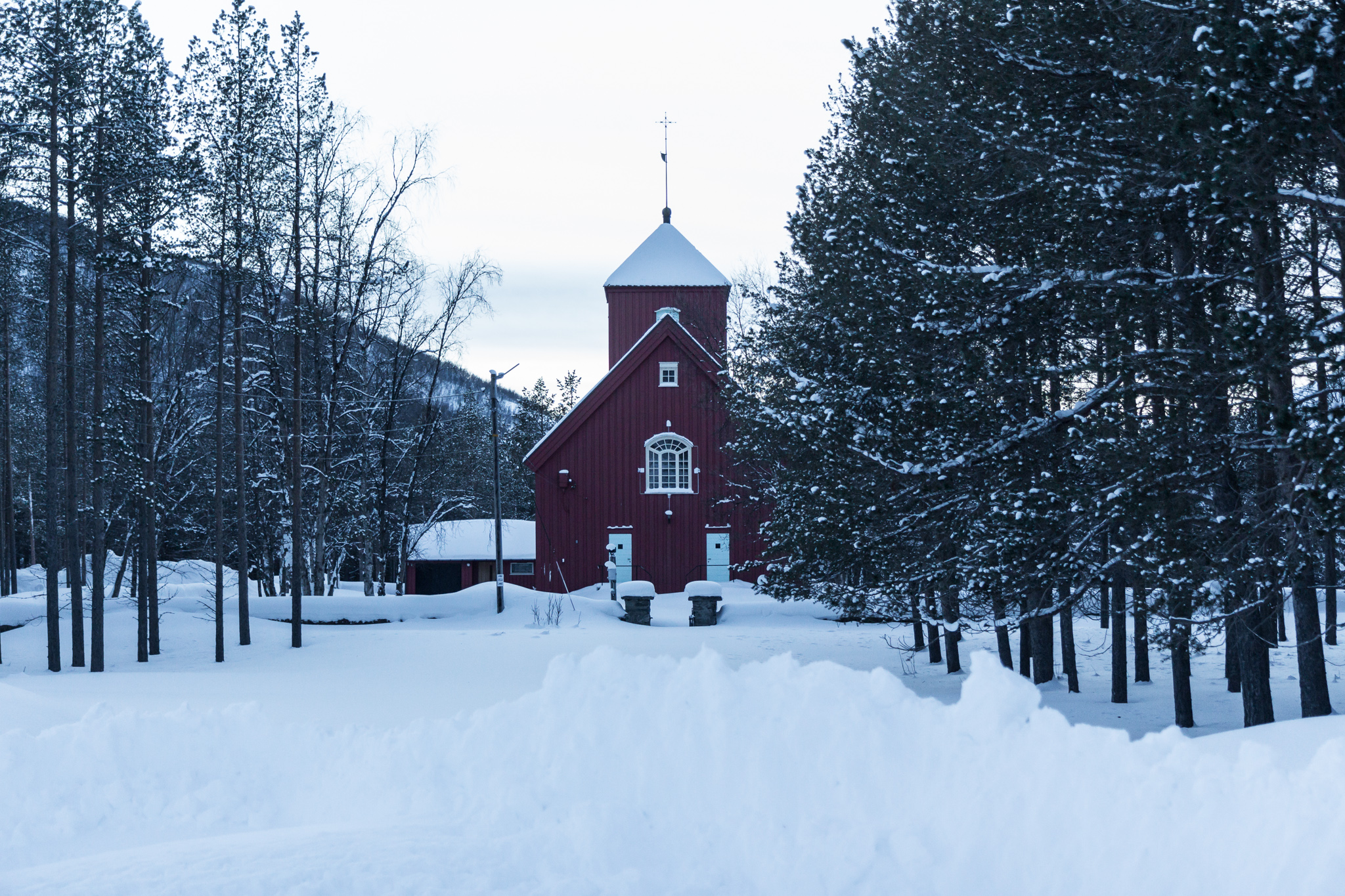
Rotsund Chapel in Nordreisa

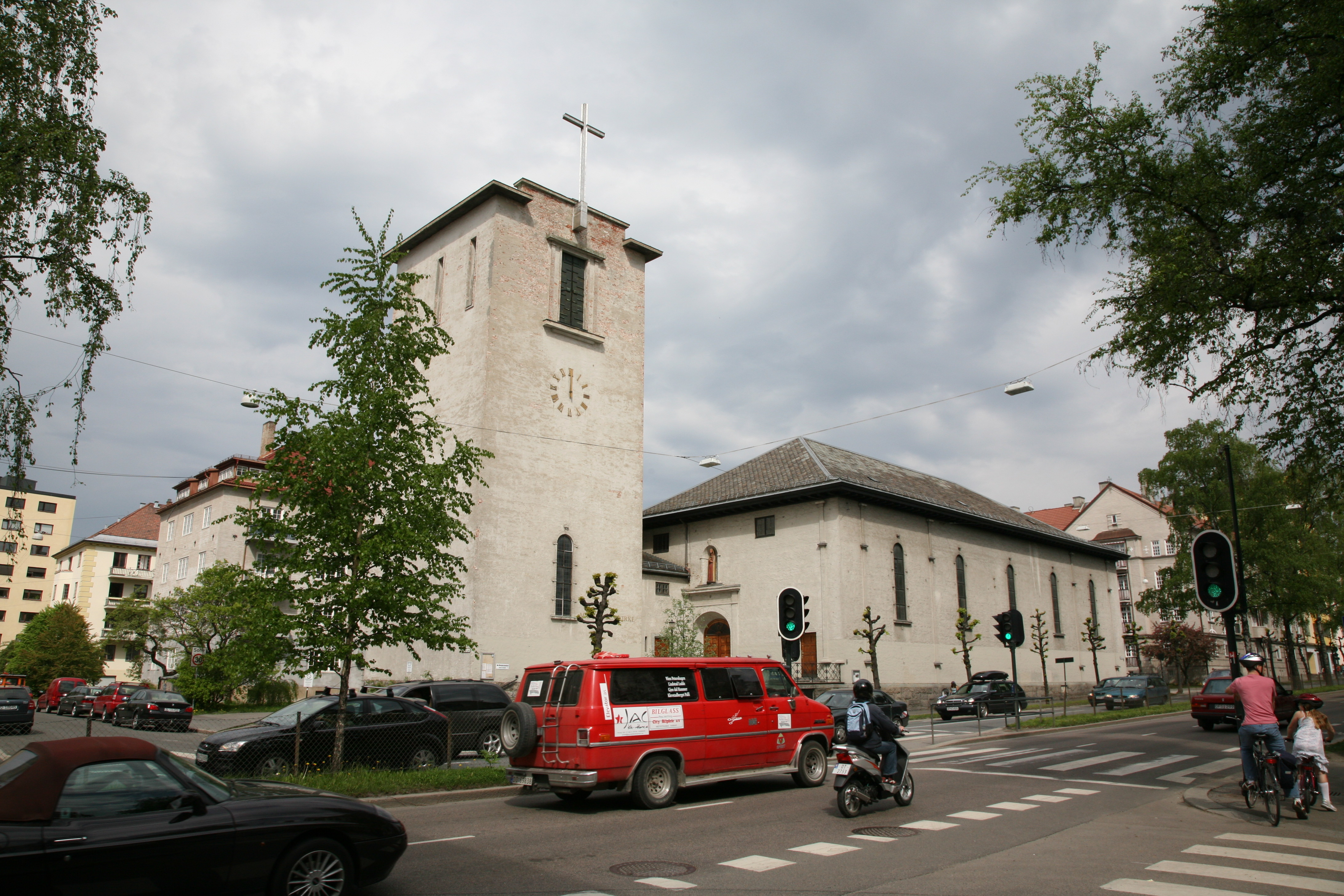
Majorstuen Church at Kirkeveien in Oslo

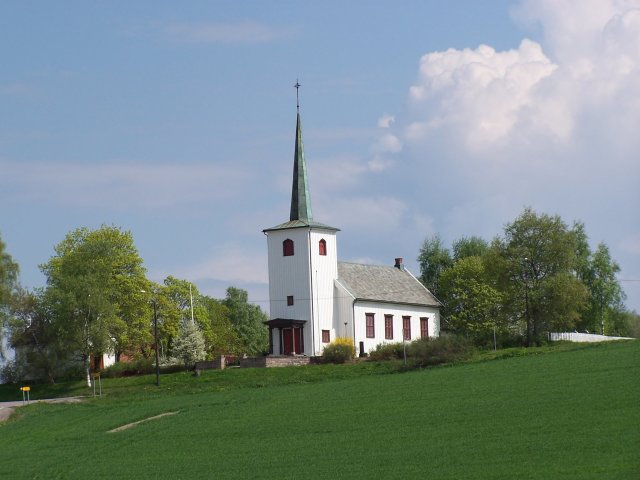
Kroer Church at Ås in Akershus

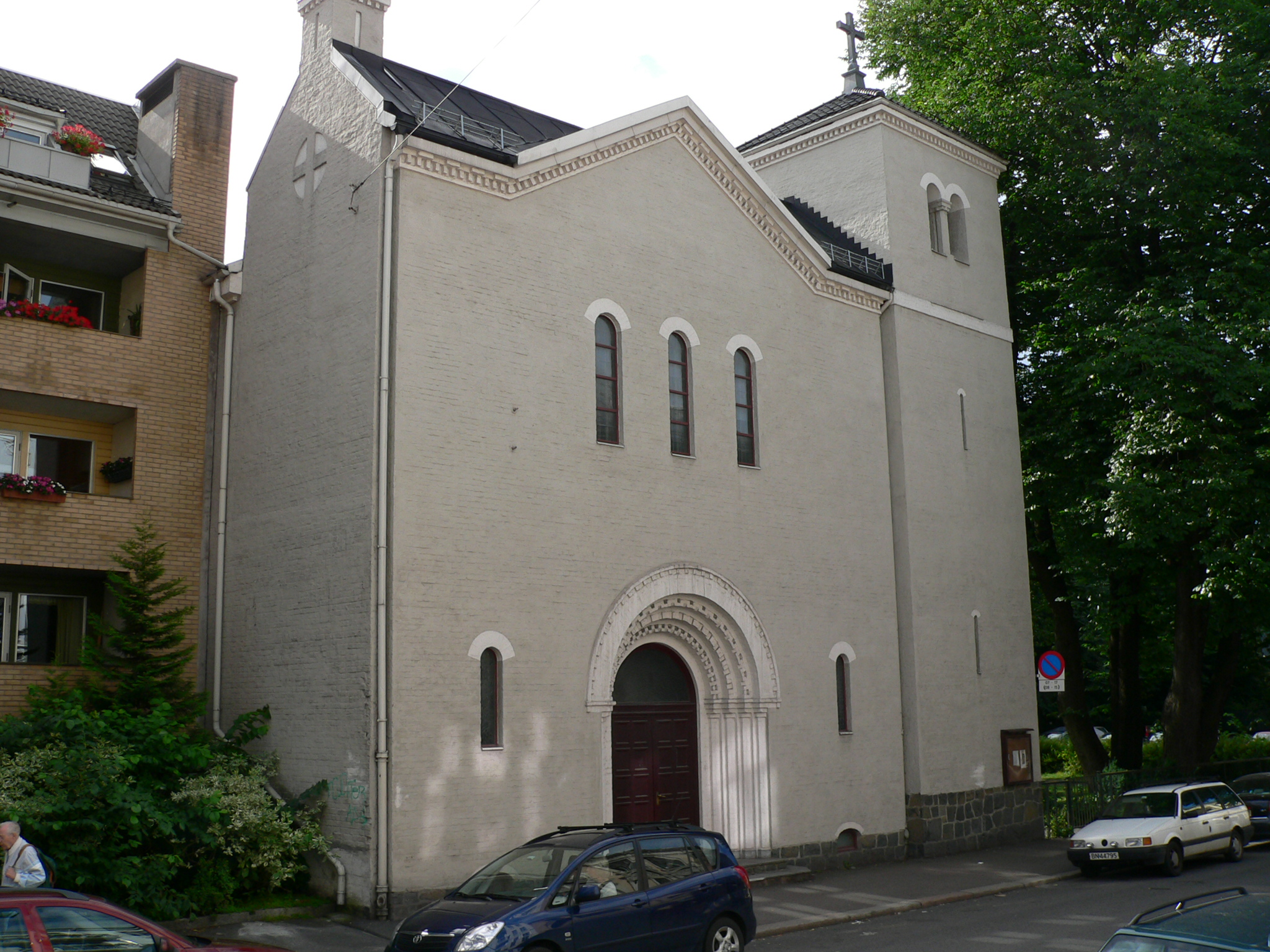
St. Dominican Church and Monastery in Oslo

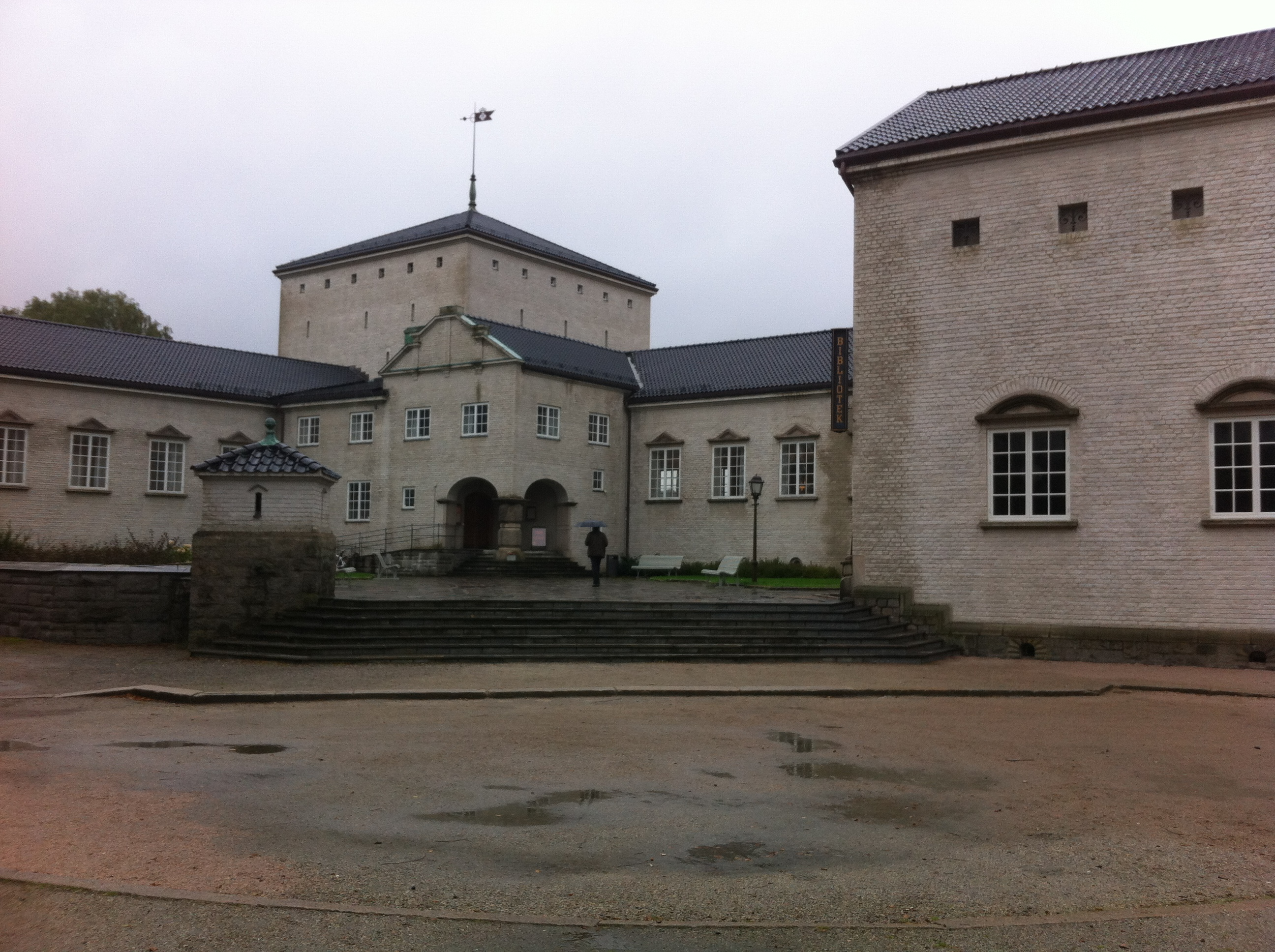
Fredrikstad Library at Cicignon in Fredrikstad
