= Hercules Brabazon Brabazon =

English painter

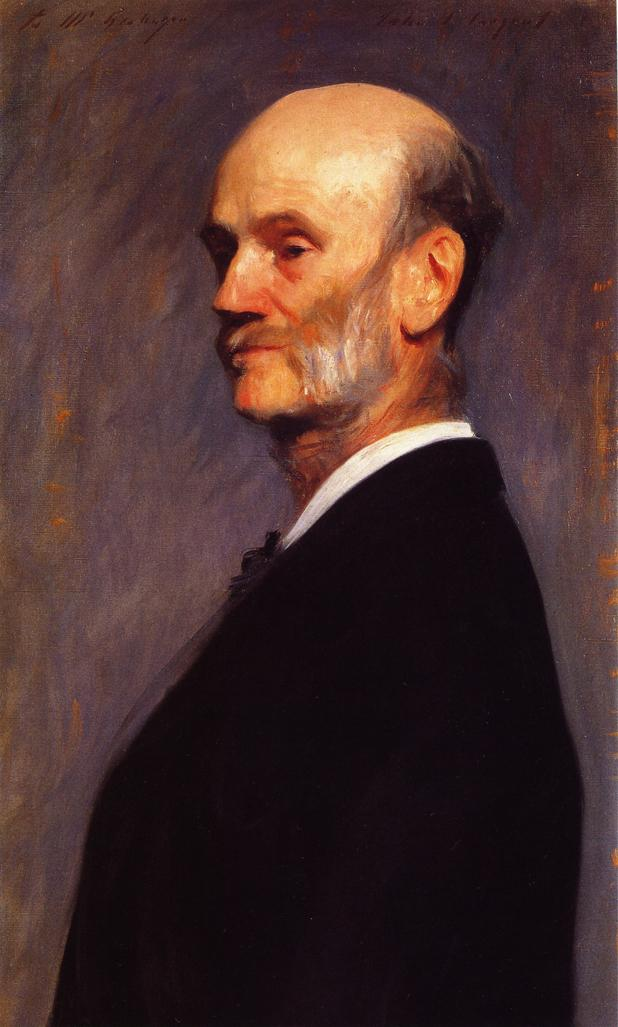
Hercules Brabazon Brabazon, portrait by John Singer Sargent, 1893

Hercules Brabazon Brabazon (born Hercules Brabazon Sharpe; 27 November 1821 – 14 May 1906) was an English artist, accomplished in Turner-manner watercolours.

== Life and work ==
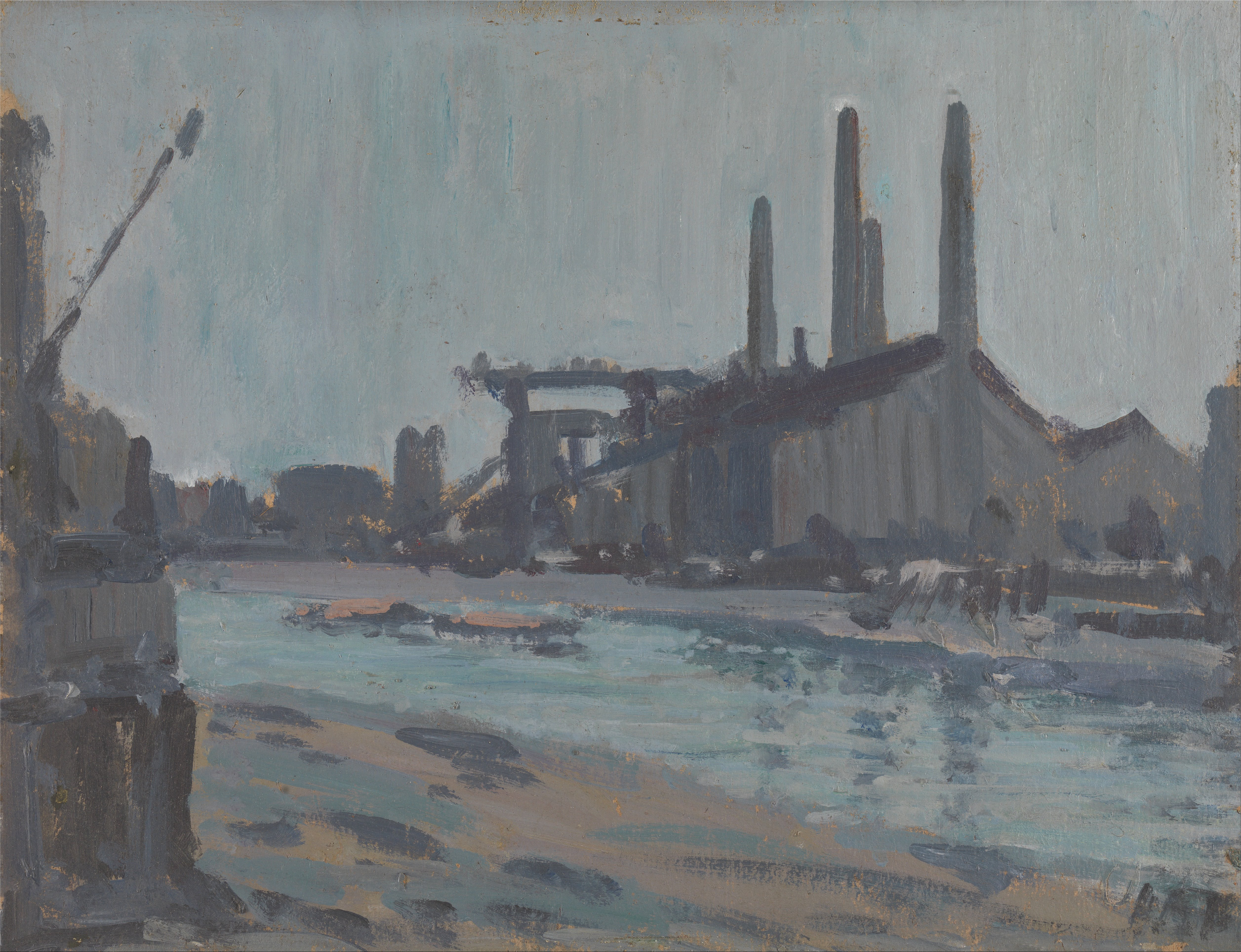
Landscape with Industrial Buildings by a River, ca. 1890

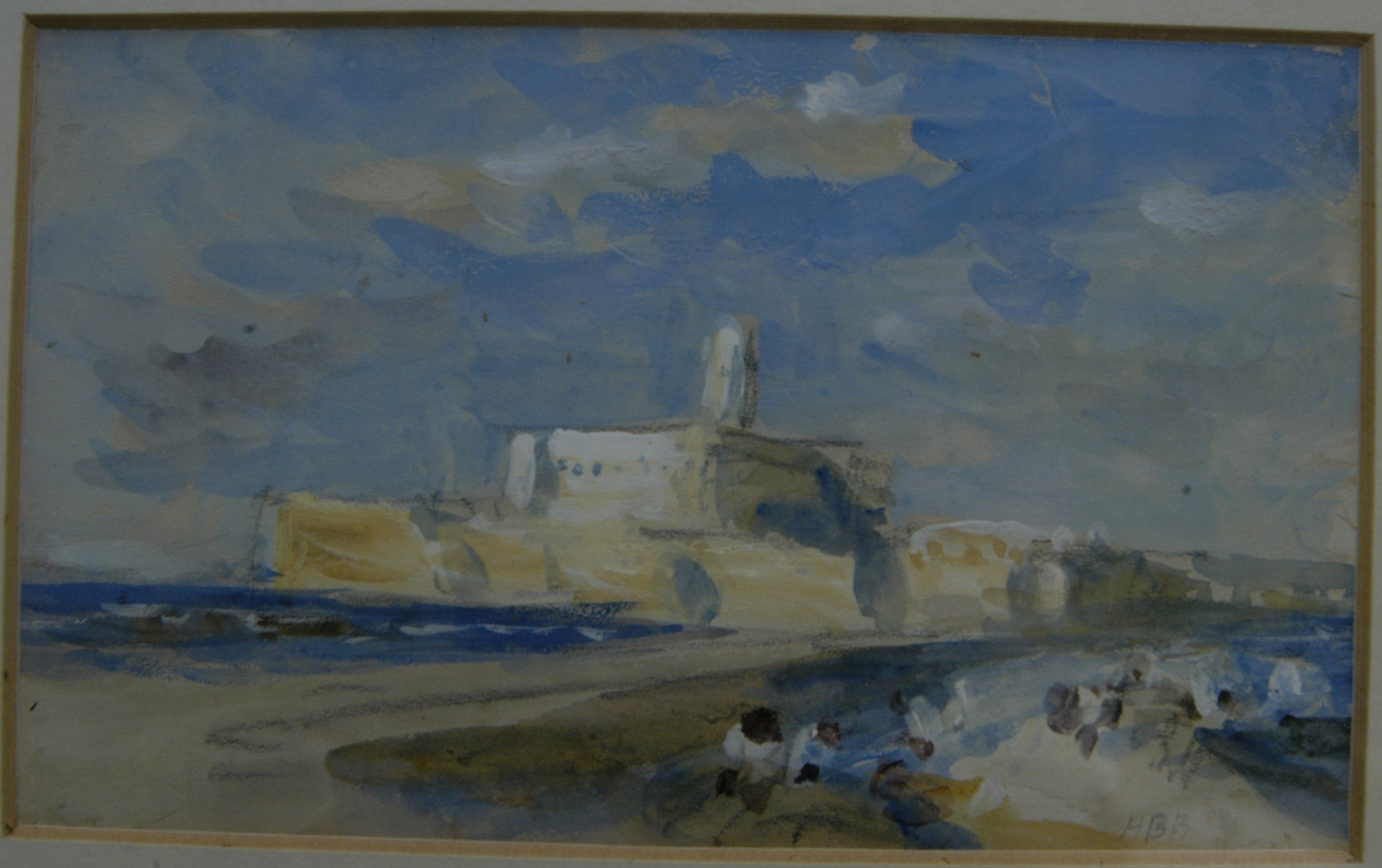
A coastal scene, believed to be Mont Saint-Michel

Brabazon was the younger son of Hercules Sharpe and his wife, Anne Mary, the daughter of Sir Anthony Brabazon, 1st Bt. Initially raised in Paris, he moved with his family to Oaklands, an estate near Sedlescombe, East Sussex, in 1832. He attended Harrow School, the École Privat, Geneva, and Trinity College, Cambridge, graduating with a B.A. in mathematics in 1844.

His father then wanted him to study law, but instead he left England and went to Rome to study music and art, enrolling at the Accademia di Santa Cecilia and Accademia di San Luca. His father attempted to make him return by reducing his allowance, but in 1847, upon the death of his elder brother, he gained financial independence when he inherited family estates in Connaught, the will requiring that he change his surname to Brabazon. From then on he led a life of travel, art study and painting, inspired by the works of artists such as Diego Velázquez and J. M. W. Turner.

In 1858 he inherited Oaklands, whose management he left to his brother-in-law while he continued to travel – mostly in Europe, but with trips to Africa and India – always returning with his watercolours. Describing himself as living "for Art and Sunshine", he viewed himself as a gentleman amateur, and did not show or try to sell his work until his mid-seventies.

With the encouragement of artist friends, particularly John Singer Sargent, he began to exhibit, first at the New English Art Club, followed by successful one-man exhibitions at the Goupil Gallery in Bond Street. Brabazon was homosexual, and never married. He died at Sedlescombe in 1906, and is buried there.

== Reputation ==
Due to financial problems with the family estate, in 1926 Brabazon's relatives sold the works that they had inherited. The quantity, 3199 over 27 months, seriously devalued their price and Brabazon's reputation. Since the 1980s, however, the art dealership Chris Beetles Ltd has led a revival, and many major museums have examples of his work.

Brabazon's work is held in the permanent collections of many institutions, including the Indianapolis Museum of Art, the Museum of New Zealand Te Papa Tongarewa, the Victoria and Albert Museum, the Fine Arts Museums of San Francisco, the University of Michigan Museum of Art, the Brooklyn Museum, the Metropolitan Museum of Art, the British Museum, the Isabella Stewart Gardner Museum, the Huntington, and the Memphis Brooks Museum of Art.

== Sources ==
- Kilburn, Jessica. "Brabazon, Hercules Brabazon (1821–1906)". Oxford Dictionary of National Biography (online ed.). Oxford University Press. doi:10.1093/ref:odnb/32017. (Subscription, Wikipedia Library access or UK public library membership required.)
