= Svolvær Church =

- Svolvær kirke
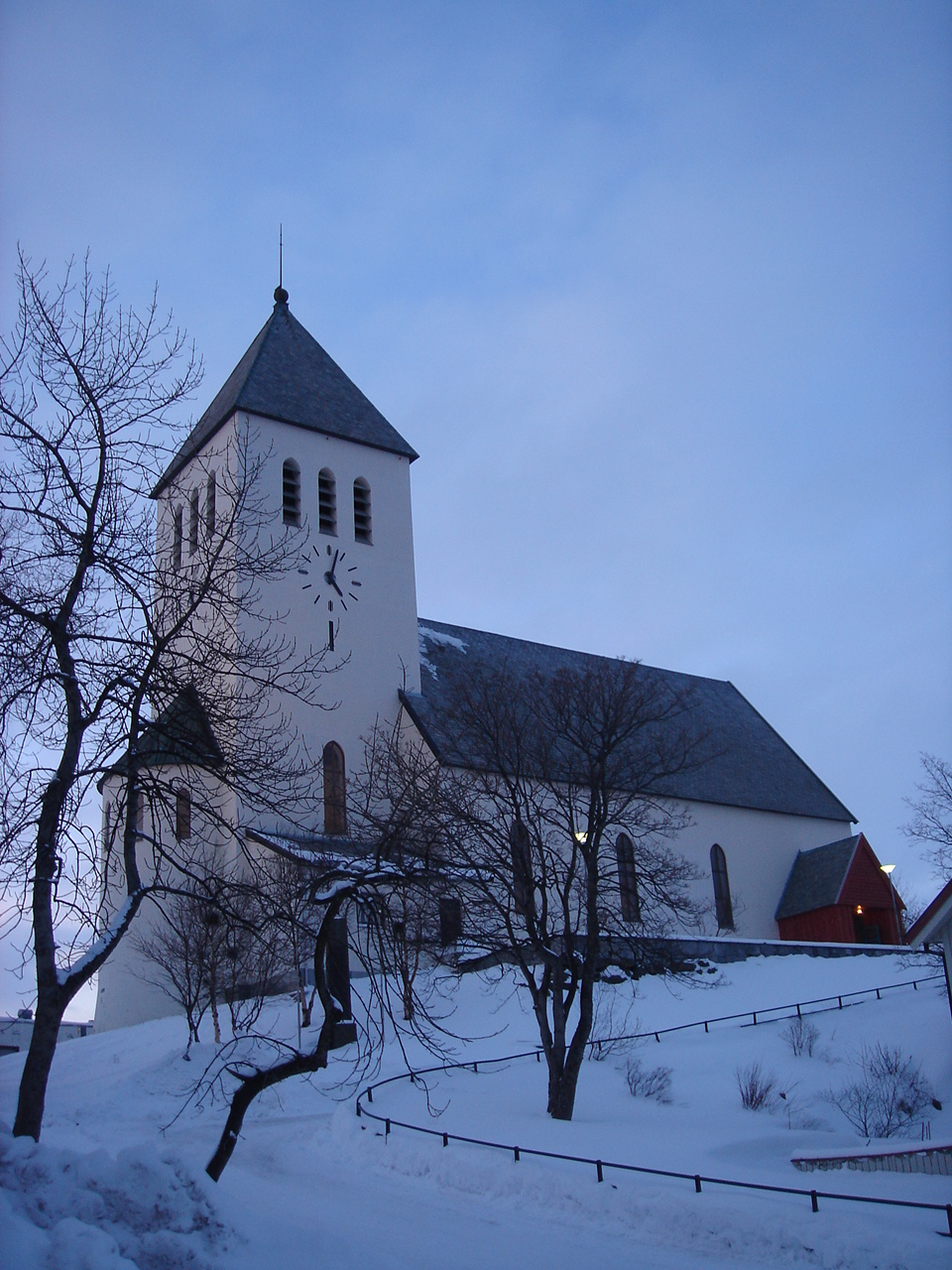
- View of the church
- Svolvær Church
- 68.23355658°N 14.56330490°E
- Location: Vågan, Nordland
- Country: Norway
- Denomination: Church of Norway
- Churchmanship: Evangelical Lutheran

History
- Status: Parish church
- Founded: 1934
- Consecrated: 25 April 1934

Architecture
- Functional status: Active
- Architect(s): Harald Sund and August Nielsen
- Architectural type: Long church
- Completed: 1934 (92 years ago)

Specifications
- Capacity: 400
- Materials: Concrete

Administration
- Diocese: Sør-Hålogaland
- Deanery: Lofoten prosti
- Parish: Svolvær
- Norwegian Cultural Heritage Site
- Type: Church
- Status: Listed
- ID: 85021

Svolvær Church (Norwegian: Svolvær kirke) is a parish church of the Church of Norway in Vågan Municipality in Nordland county, Norway. It is located in the town of Svolvær on the island of Austvågøya. It is the main church for the Svolvær parish which is part of the Lofoten prosti (deanery) in the Diocese of Sør-Hålogaland. The white, concrete church was built in a long church style in 1934 using plans drawn up by the architects Harald Sund and August Nielsen. The church seats about 400 people.

== Media gallery ==
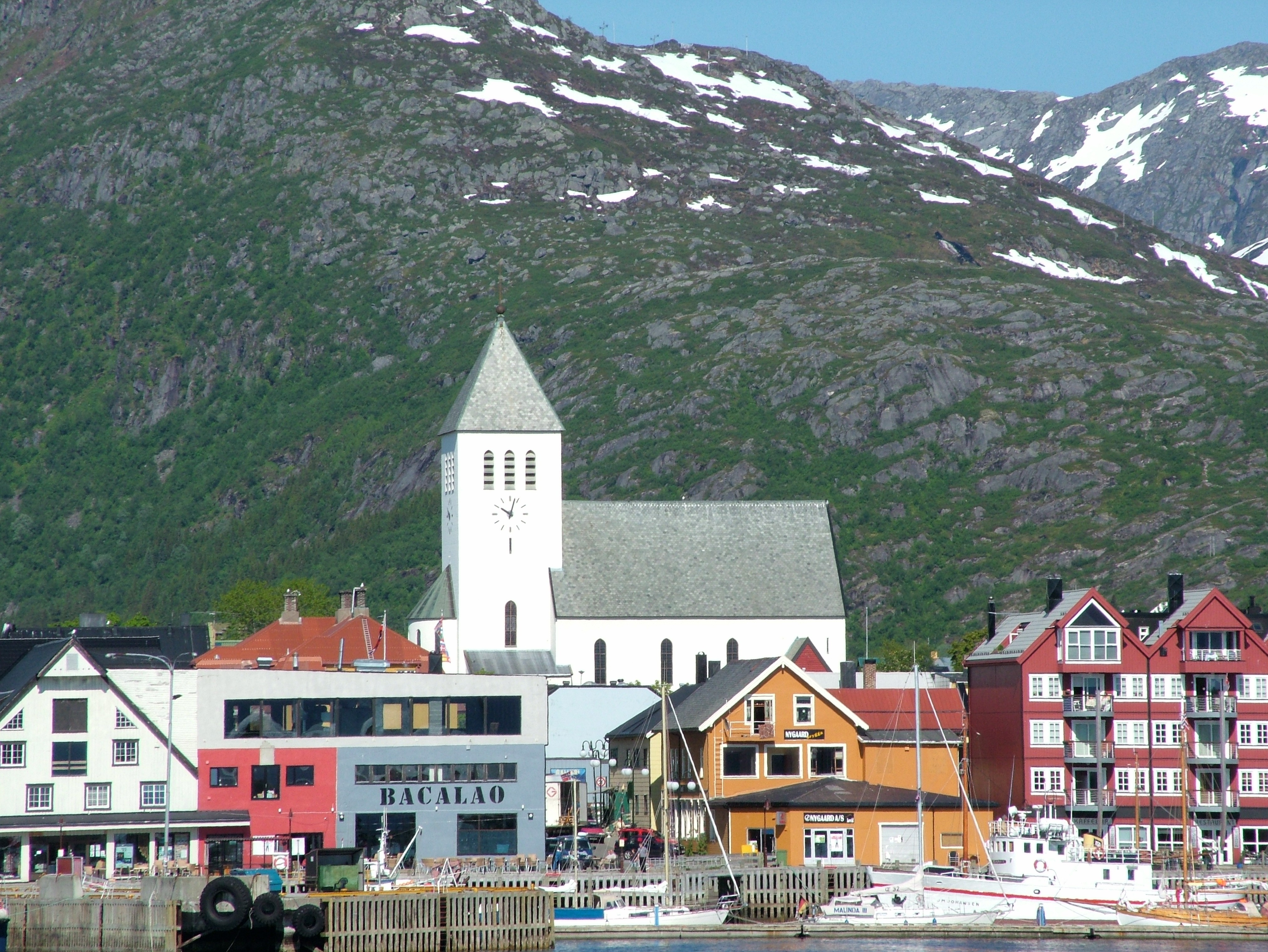
View of the church and its surroundings

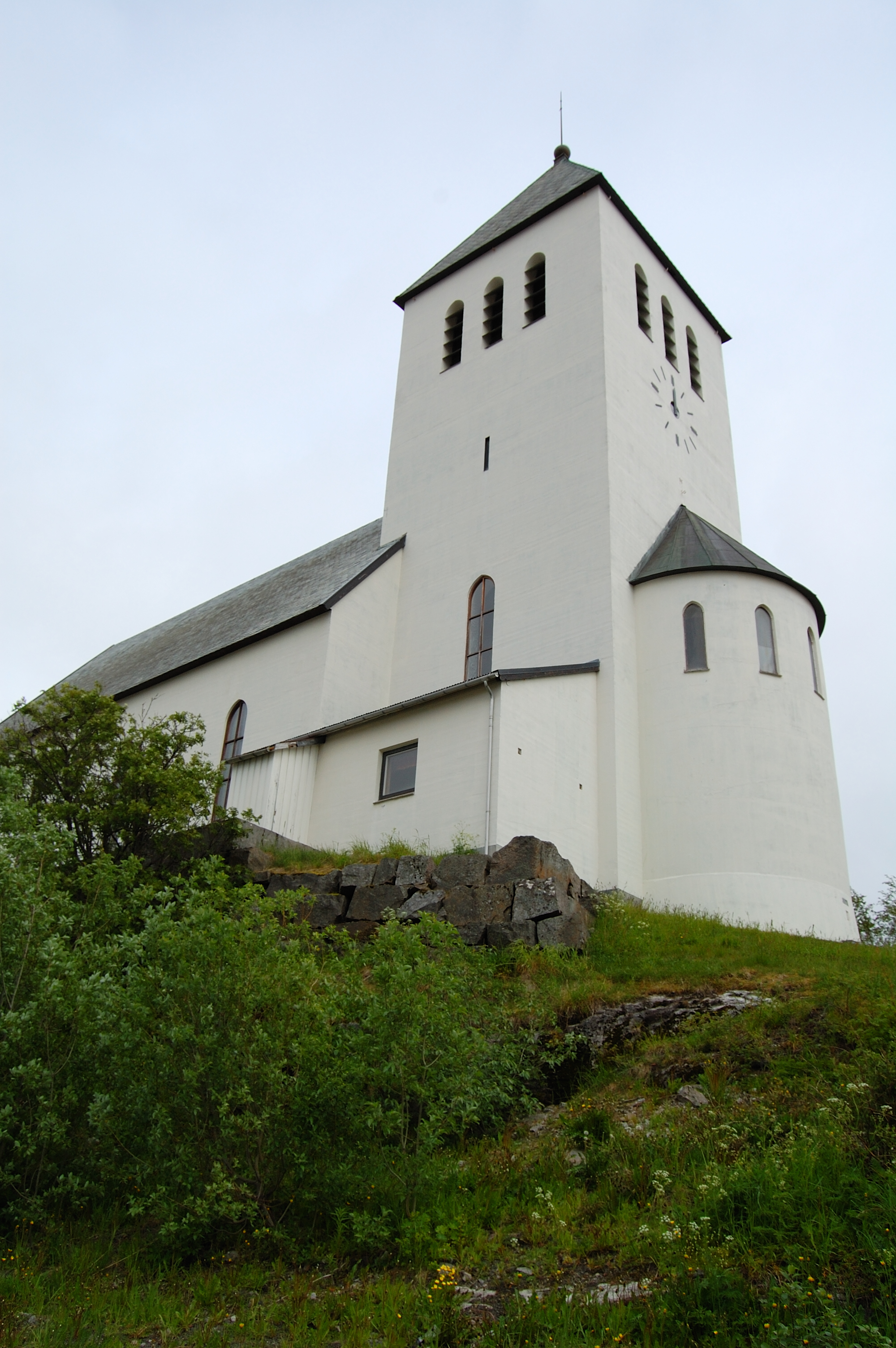
Exterior view

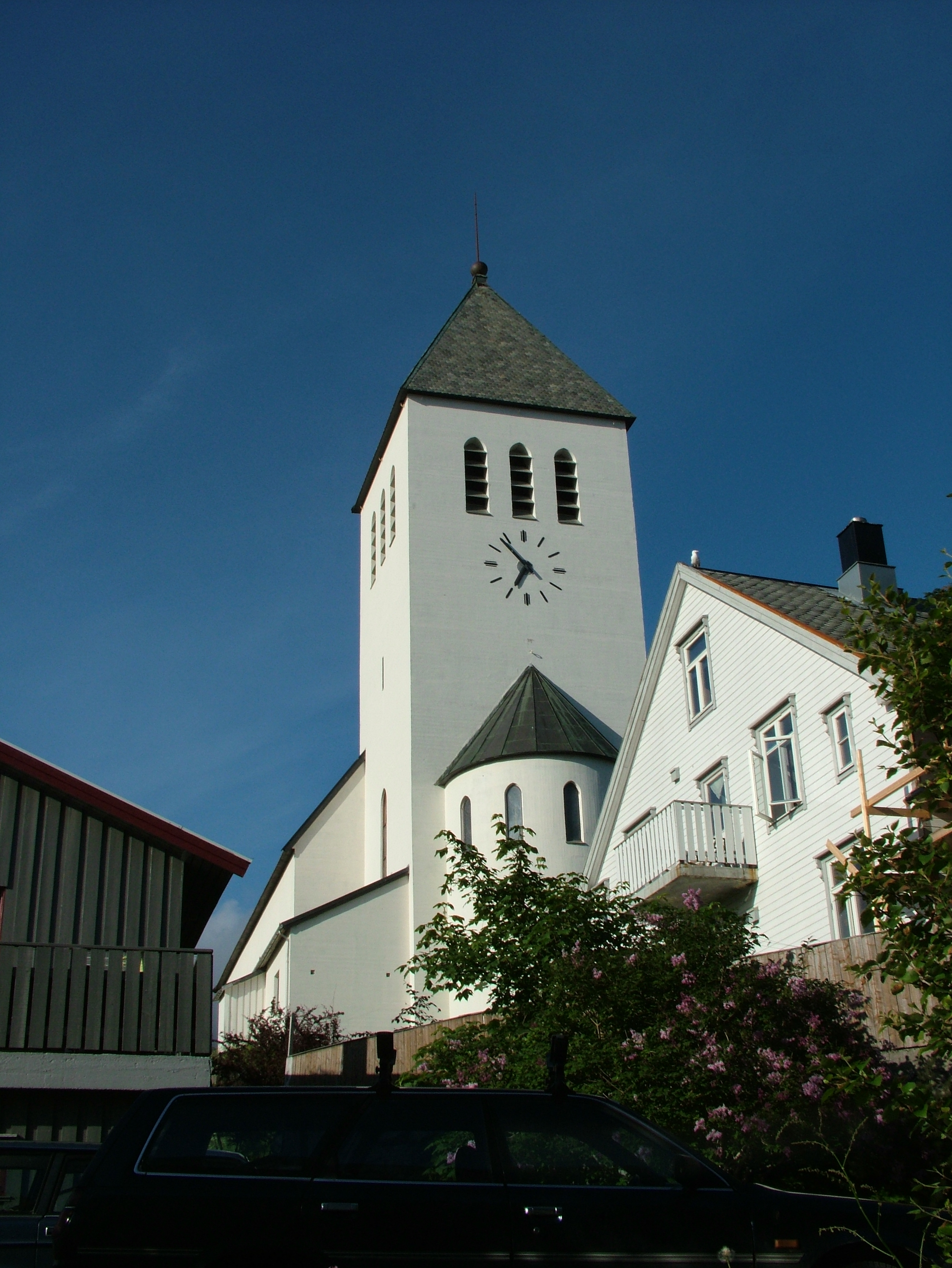
Another exterior view

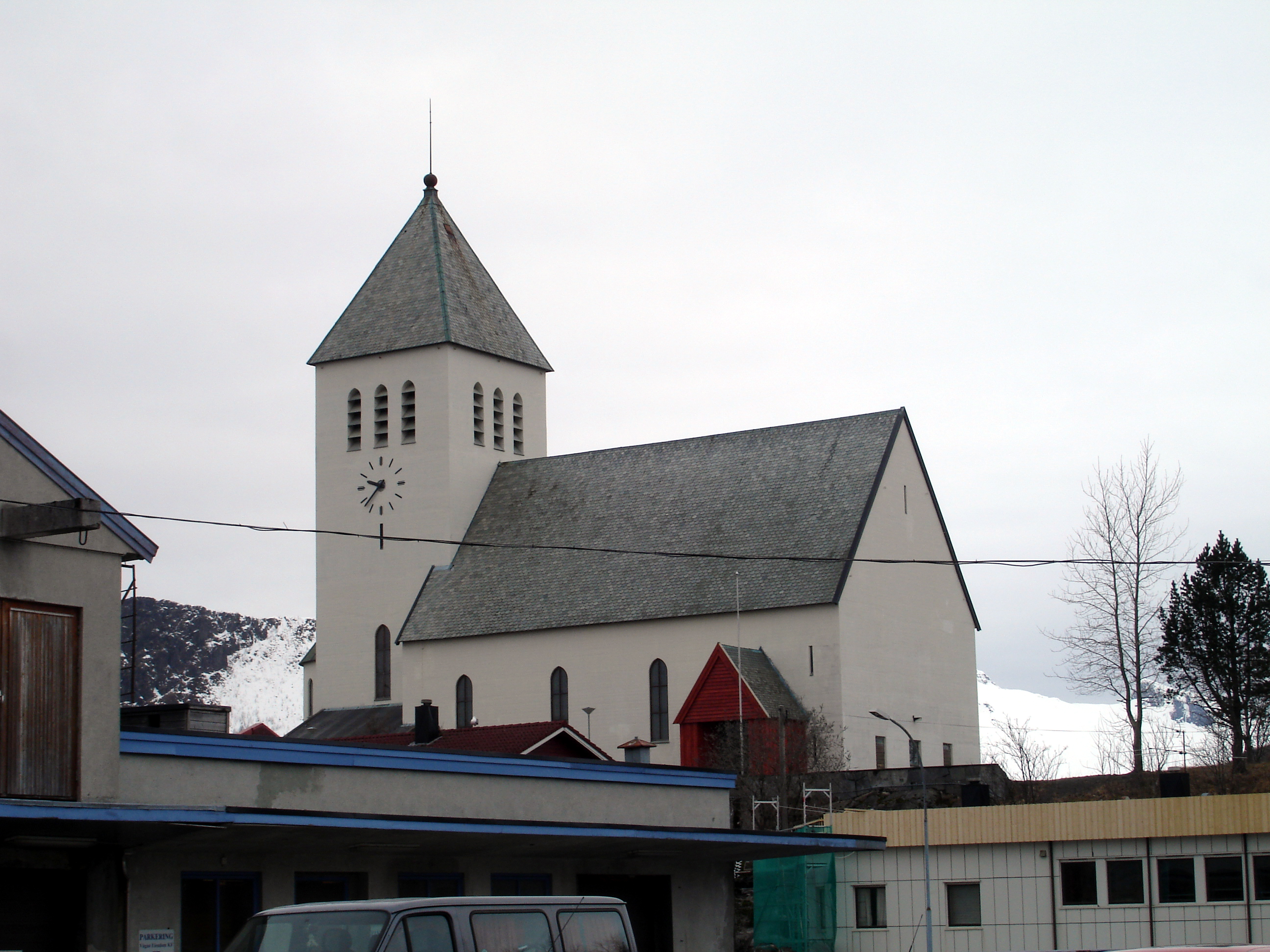
Side view of the church

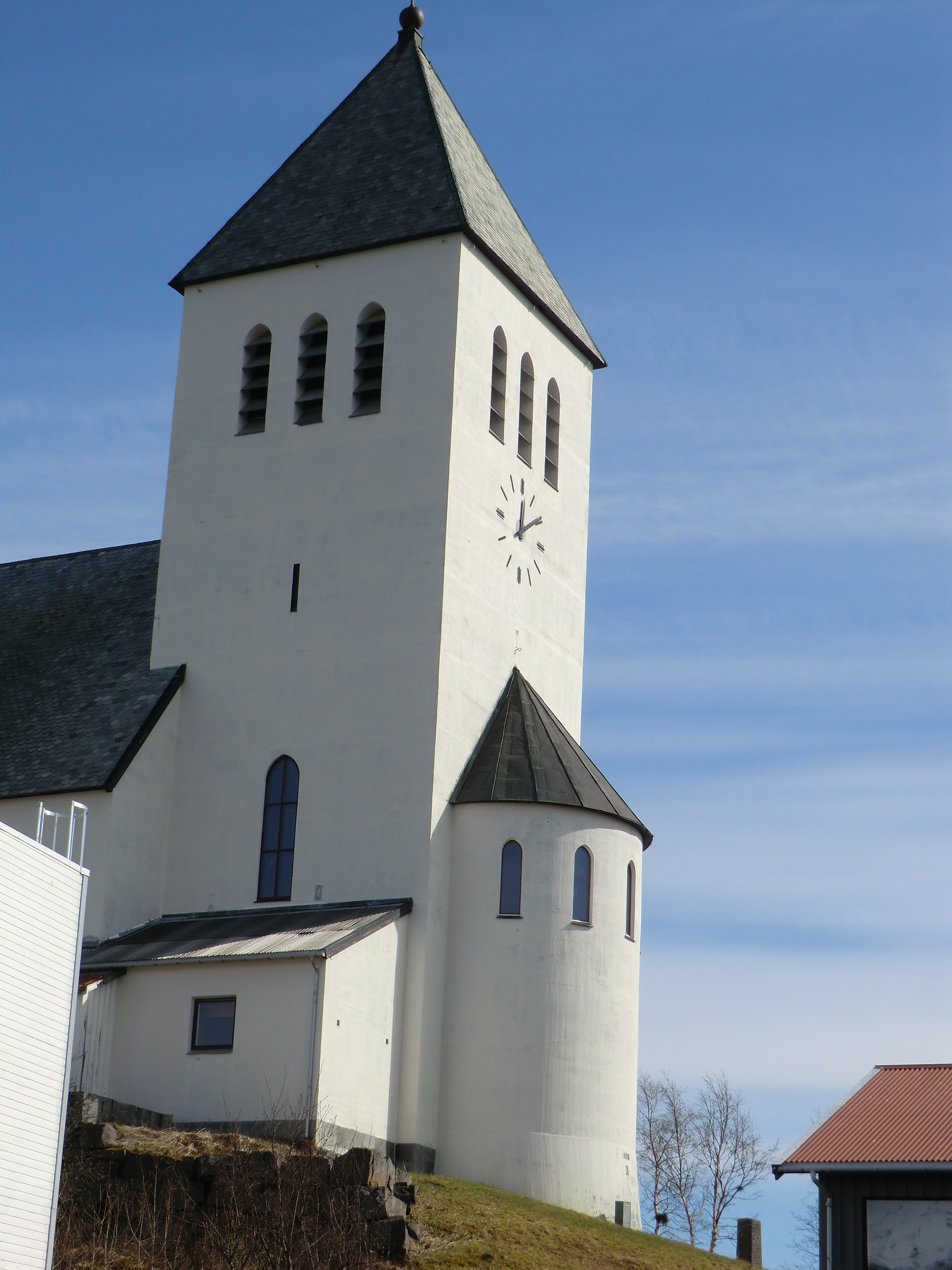
Tower

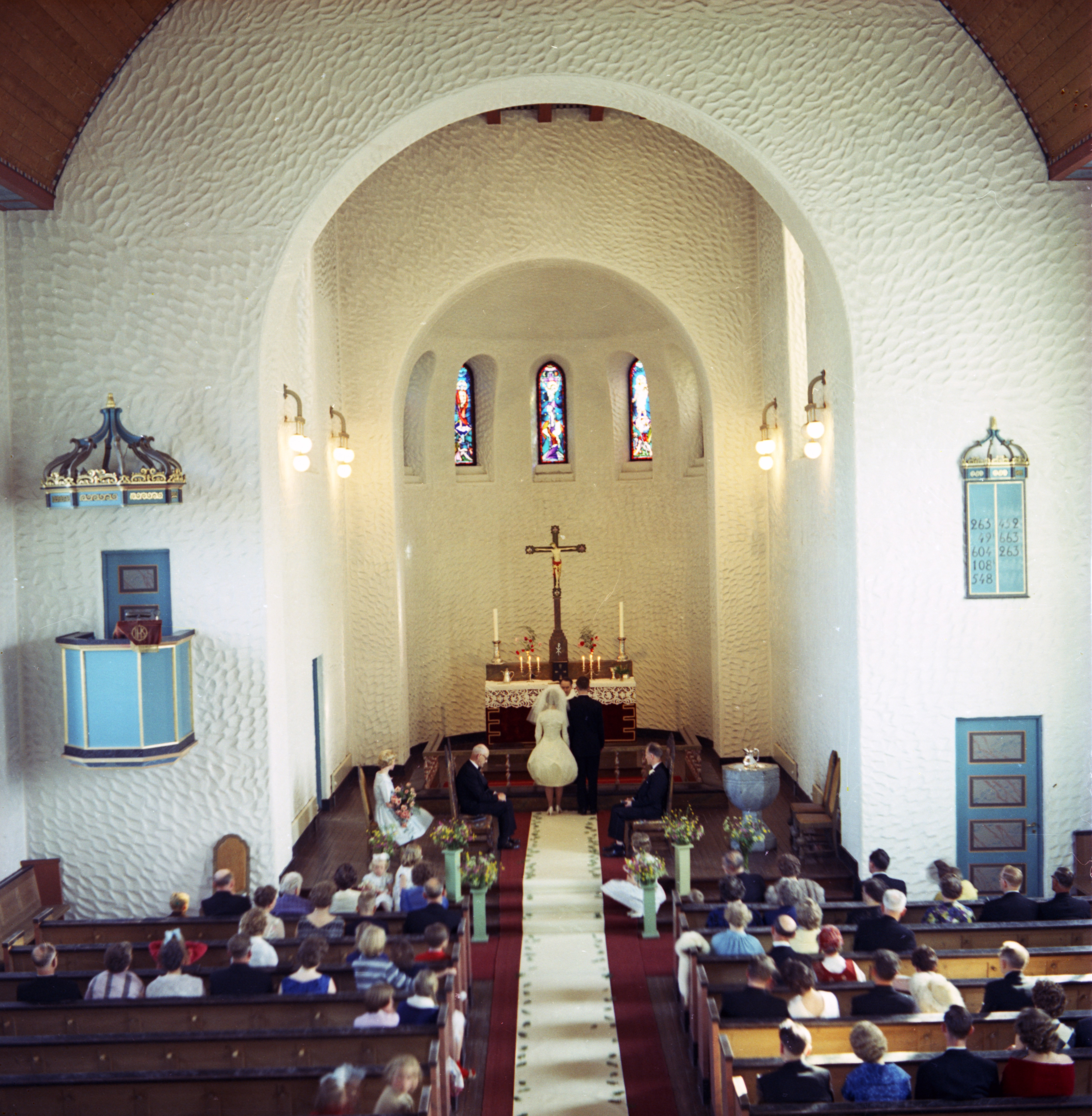
Interior view

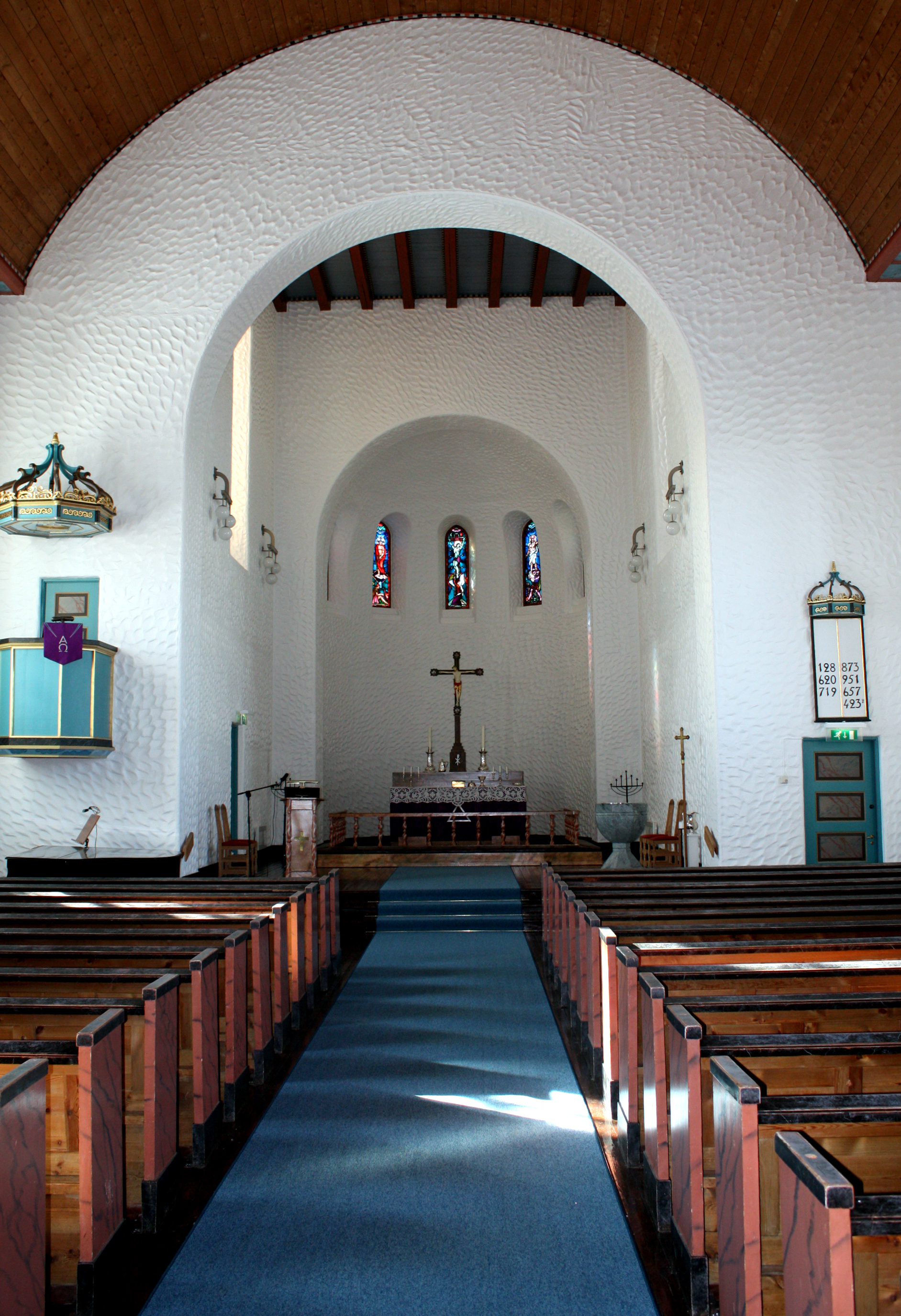
Another interior view

== See also ==
- List of churches in Sør-Hålogaland
