= Patrick Cullen (artist) =

British painter (born 1949)

- Born: 1949 (age 76–77); Addlestone, Surrey, England
- Education: University of Bristol; St Martin's School of Art; Camberwell School of Art
- Occupation: Contemporary artist
- Website: patrickcullen.co.uk

Patrick Cullen (born 1949) is a British contemporary artist, who since 2023 has been president of the New English Art Club (NEAC).

== Biography ==
Patrick Cullen was born in 1949, in Addlestone, Surrey, England. He studied politics and sociology at the University of Bristol, and after graduating decided to focus on painting, having been interested in art since childhood. In London, he did a foundation course at St Martin's School of Art (from 1972 to 1973), and then went to Camberwell School of Art (1973–1976), where he earned a BA (Hons) degree in Fine Art. Among influential tutors he met at Camberwell was Dick Lee, "a wonderful landscape painter and a good teacher too – always ready to do a little sketch on the edge of your life drawing to put you right, or to go to the library to introduce you to the work of some not-so-well-known artist one should acquaint oneself with."

Noted for his landscapes, street scenes as well as portraits, Cullen uses oils, pastels and watercolours, reflecting in his paintings and sketches his travels in Tuscany, Andalucia, Southern France and India.

Cullen was elected a member of The Pastel Society (1990–2003), and in 1997 a Member of the New English Art Club (an organisation he has characterised as "born in reaction to the stuffiness of the Royal Academy"), of which he was elected president in 2023, succeeding Peter Brown in the role.

Recent exhibitions featuring Cullen's work include solo shows at the Chris Beetles Gallery in St. James's, London, and participation in NEAC annual group shows.

== Awards ==
Cullen was a 2015 finalist for the Lynn Painter-Stainers Prize with his painting Death in Varanasi, burning ghats at Dusk, and in 2016 was the winner of the NEAC Critics' Prize, having won many other awards over the decades, including:

- 1984: Spirit of London Competition, Royal Festival Hall, Prizewinner
- 1989: Royal Academy Summer Exhibition, The Watercolour Prize
- 1990: Pastel Society, Daler Rowney Award
- 1991: Royal Watercolour Society, Abbot and Holder Award
- 1995: Pastel Society, Daler Rowney Award
- 2000: Pastel Society Centenary Exhibition, Daler Rowney Award
- 2001: New English Art Club, The Kathleen Tronson Award
- 2001: New English Art Club, The Jans Ondaatje Rolls Prize
- 2003: New English Art Club, The Minto Prize
- 2004: Royal Watercolour Society, RWS Award
- 2012: Chelsea Art Society, Painting Prize
- 2015: Lynn Painter Stainer Prize, Runner-up Prize
- 2016: The Critics' Prize at the New English Art Club
