= Kroer Church =

Coordinates: 59°38′17″N 10°50′52″E

- Kroer kirke
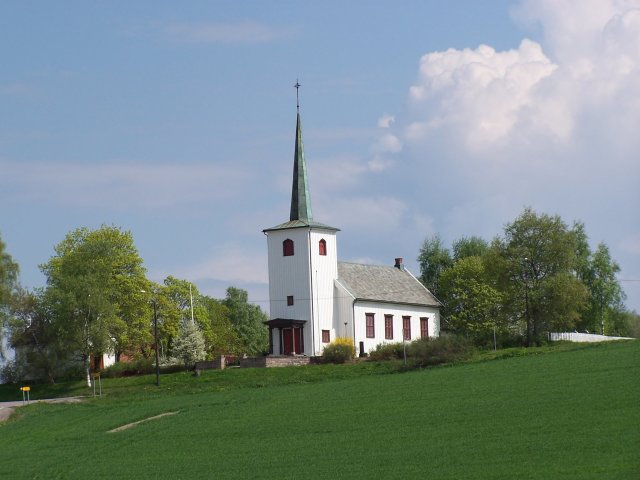
- View of the church

- Location of the church
- Location: Ås, Akershus
- Country: Norway
- Denomination: Church of Norway
- Churchmanship: Evangelical Lutheran

History
- Status: Parish church

Architecture
- Functional status: Active
- Architect: Harald Sund
- Completed: 1925

Specifications
- Capacity: 120
- Materials: Wood

Administration
- Deanery: Søndre Follo

Kroer Church (Kroer kirke) is a "long church" (Norwegian: langkirke) in the Deanery of Søndre Follo at Ås, in Akershus county, Norway.

== History ==
Kroer Church is built in 1925 of wood and can accommodate 120 people. It was designed by Norwegian architect Harald Sund (1876–1940).

There were three previous churches in Kroer before the present one was built. The earlier ones dated from 1340, 1550, and 1852. The 1852 church was destroyed in a fire in July 1923.
