= Skiptvet Church =

Coordinates: 59°28′4.75″N 11°10′29.94″E

- Skiptvet kirke
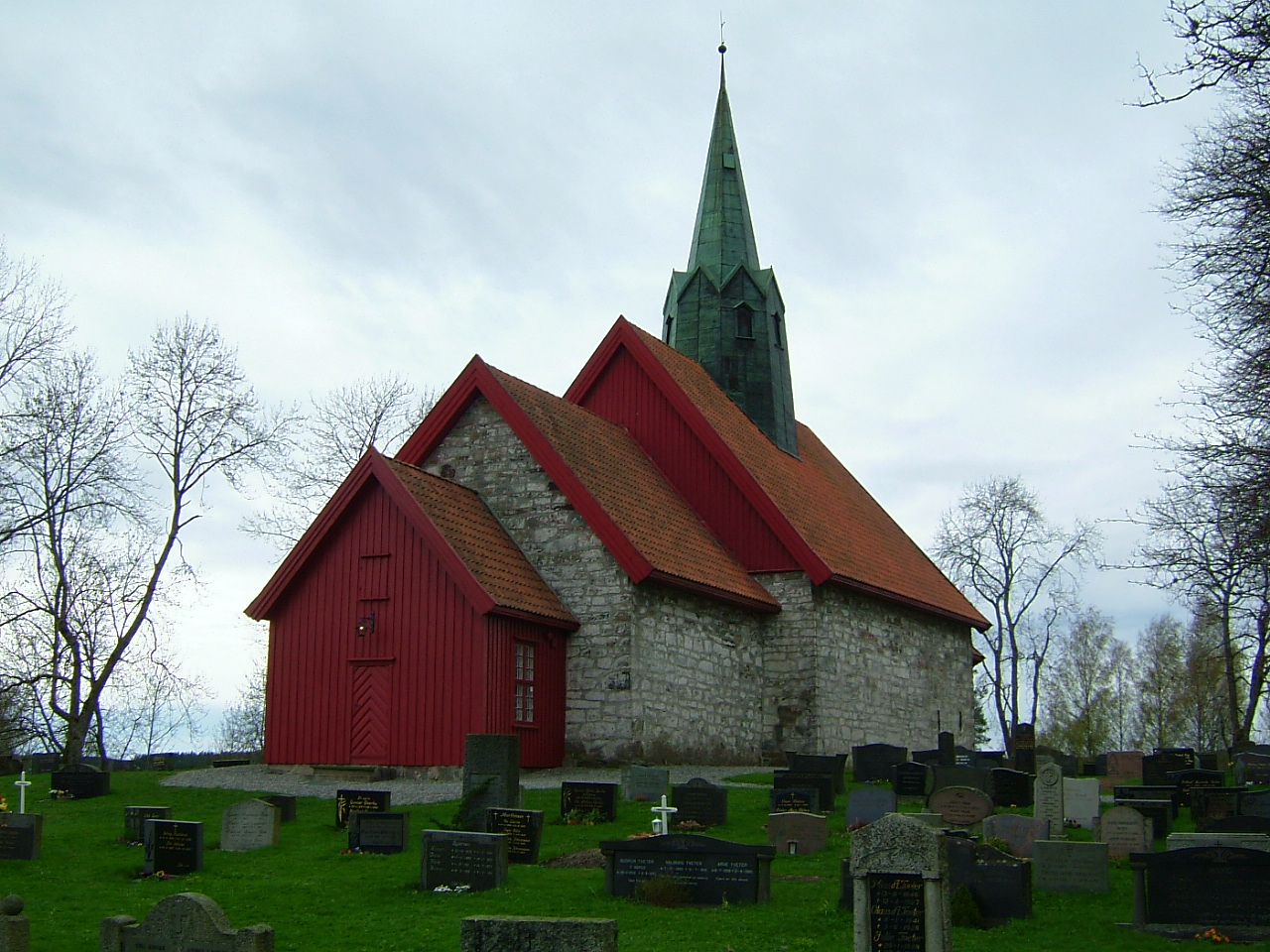
- View from the northeast, with chancel and sacristy

- Location of the church Skiptvet Church (Norway)
- Location: Skiptvet, Østfold
- Country: Norway
- Denomination: Church of Norway
- Churchmanship: Evangelical Lutheran

History
- Status: Parish church

Architecture
- Functional status: Active
- Architect: Harald Sund (restoration 1937)
- Architectural type: Romanesque
- Completed: c. 1150–1200

Specifications
- Capacity: 250
- Materials: Stone

Administration
- Deanery: Vestre Borgesyssel

Skiptvet Church (Norwegian: Skiptvet kirke) is a medieval stone church dedicated to the Virgin Mary in Skiptvet in Østfold county, Norway. Supposedly built in the second half of the 12th century (the date is not documented), it stands on a ridge west of the Glomma River. The church belongs to the Church of Norway and is part of the Deanery of Vestre Borgesyssel in the Diocese of Borg.

The original church burned in 1762 and parts of it were rebuilt. None of the original furnishings remain. The current altarpiece portraying the Eucharist was painted by Albert Lobech in 1768 and was kept by the Norwegian Museum of Cultural History until 1937, when the church was restored by Harald Sund. The baptismal font is made of wood and was created by Harald Sund and Helge Amundsen. There is a cemetery next to the church.

== Building ==
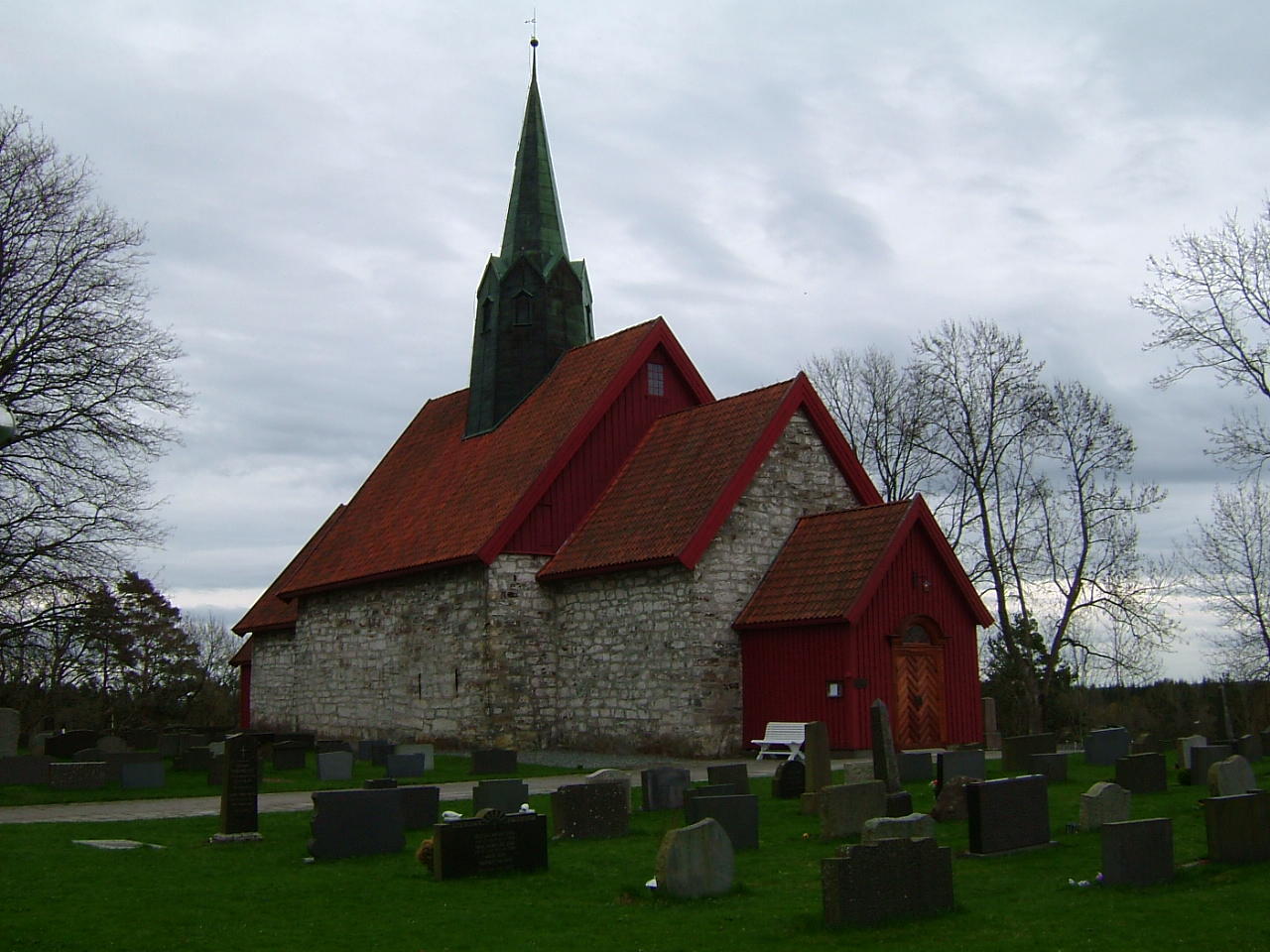
View from the northwest, with former tower and narthex

The church has a rectangular nave and a slightly narrower squared-off chancel. It originally had a bell tower to the west that was torn down. The base of the tower remains with a gabled roof, and the church has a ridge turret. The east gable of the tower is masonry up to the ridge, but the gables of the nave are made of wood. The church has a wooden narthex west of tower base, and a wooden sacristy east of the chancel.

Parts of the walls of the medieval church are preserved.

A legend about a dragon was connected with the old church. The legend is reflected in the dragon on Skiptvet's coat of arms.

== Interior ==
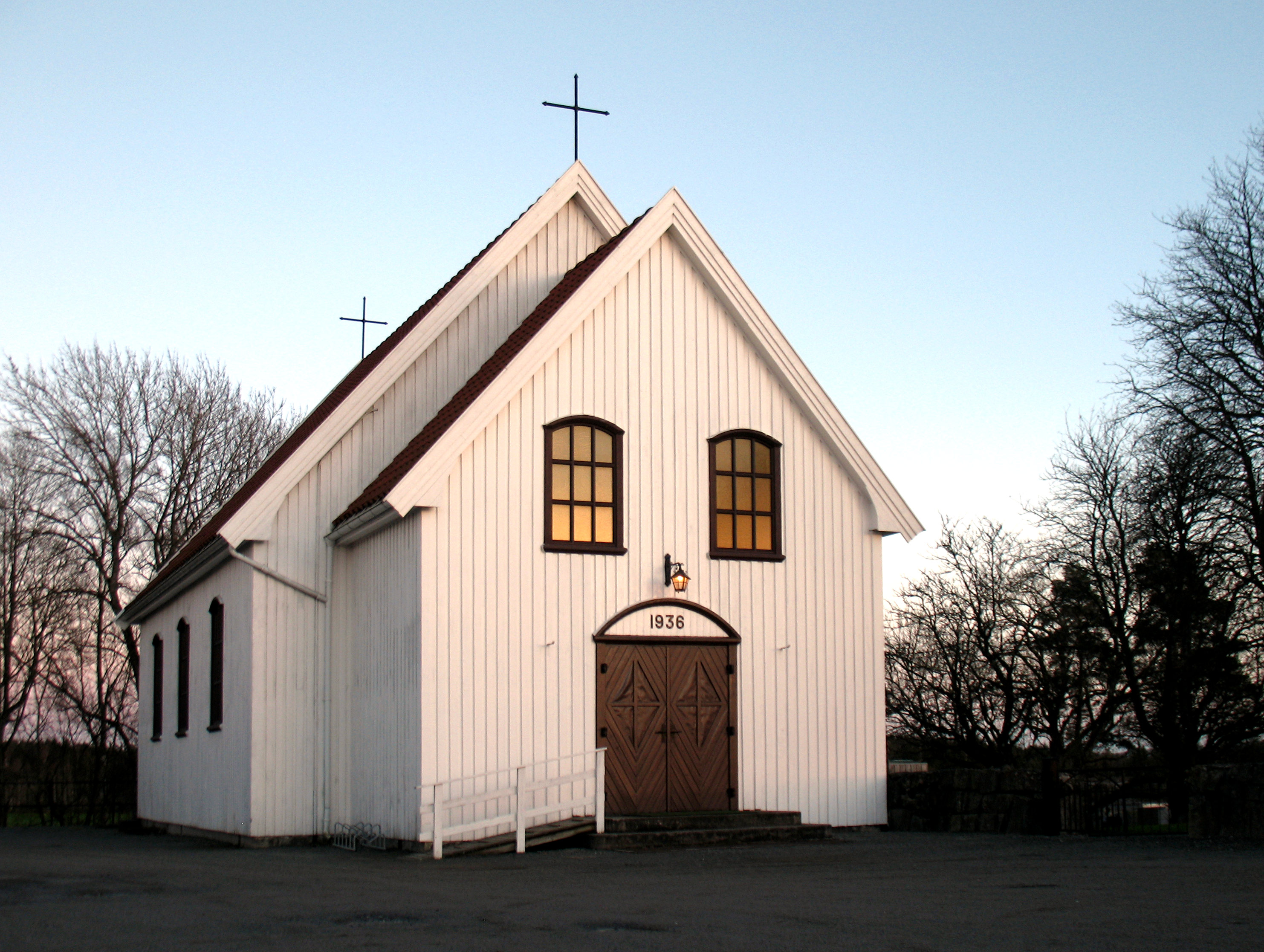
Skiptvet Church cemetery chapel

The church has a single nave with a gallery on the west side and along the north side. The choir has an arch across the full width of the chancel. During the church's reconstruction in 1895, the interior furnishings except for the pulpit and altarpiece were removed and restored. In 1937 the interior was again restored by the architect Harald Sund and the painter Ulrik Hendriksen. At that time, the walls were whitewashed, and the baptismal font, chancel screen, and benches renovated. A new sounding board was installed above the pulpit and the galleries were modified. The interior was painted in brighter colors and the church was equipped with electric light and heating.

The altarpiece from 1768 was taken from the Norwegian Museum of Cultural History and the one from 1898 moved to the cemetery chapel.
