= Peter Brown (British artist) =

British painter (born 1967)

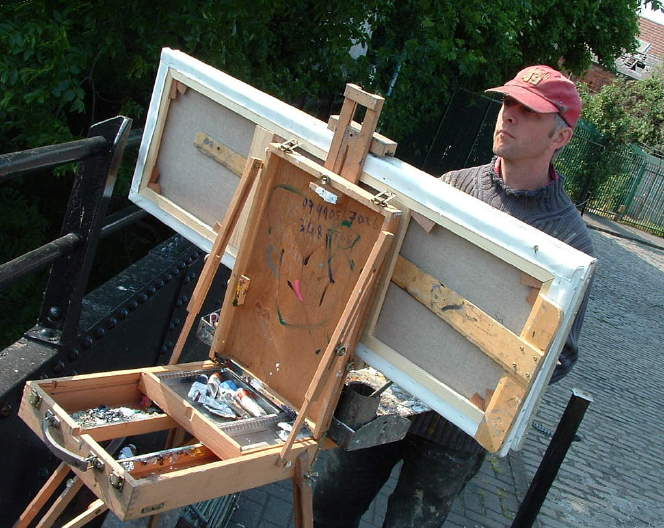
"Pete the street" at work.

Peter Edward Mackenzie Brown (born 28 July 1967) is a British Impressionist painter popularly known as "Pete the Street" from his practice of working on location in all weathers. He is best known for his depictions of street scenes and landscapes. He loves working 'in the thick of it' painting the streets of Varanasi to Toronto and closer to home in Barcelona, Paris, London and his adopted home city of Bath. He insists on working directly from the subject refusing to use photographic reference.

== Life and career ==
Brown was born in Reading and educated at Presentation College, Reading. He graduated in fine art from Manchester Polytechnic in 1990. He moved to Bath in 1993, where he lives with his wife Lisa and five children, and took up painting full-time in 1995. He developed a vigorous en plein air style, and happily interacts with passers-by while at work. "Working is like being at a party. I need to be at the centre of things," he has said. "Consciously or subconsciously, what I experience finds its way onto the canvas."

Brown was elected a member of the New English Art Club in 1998, and became its President in 2018, being succeeded at the end of his five-year tenure by Patrick Cullen. Brown is also a member of the Royal Society of Portrait Painters, the Royal Institute of Oil Painters, The Pastel Society and is an honorary member of the Royal Society of British Artists. In 2006, he became the first Artist-in-Residence at the Savoy Hotel, London. In 2008, he won the Prince of Wales Award for Portrait Drawing.

In 2022 he opened an exhibition of paintings at the Victoria Art Gallery in Bath entitled "Bath, Bristol and Beyond". Many of the 100 paintings were painted during the Covid pandemic and documented the restrictions at the time.

In 2023, Brown worked with Banksy to paint the aftermath of his street piece "Valentine's Day Mascara" in Margate. The series of paintings was featured in Banksy's solo show "Cut & Run" in Glasgow. During the show's run, Brown travelled to Glasgow and made 14 additional paintings of the exterior of the GoMA, where the exhibition was taking place. He returned to Glasgow in 2026 to paint more street scenes and was in the city at the time of the Union Street fire and captured the aftermath on canvas.
