= Rotsund Chapel =

- Rotsund kapell
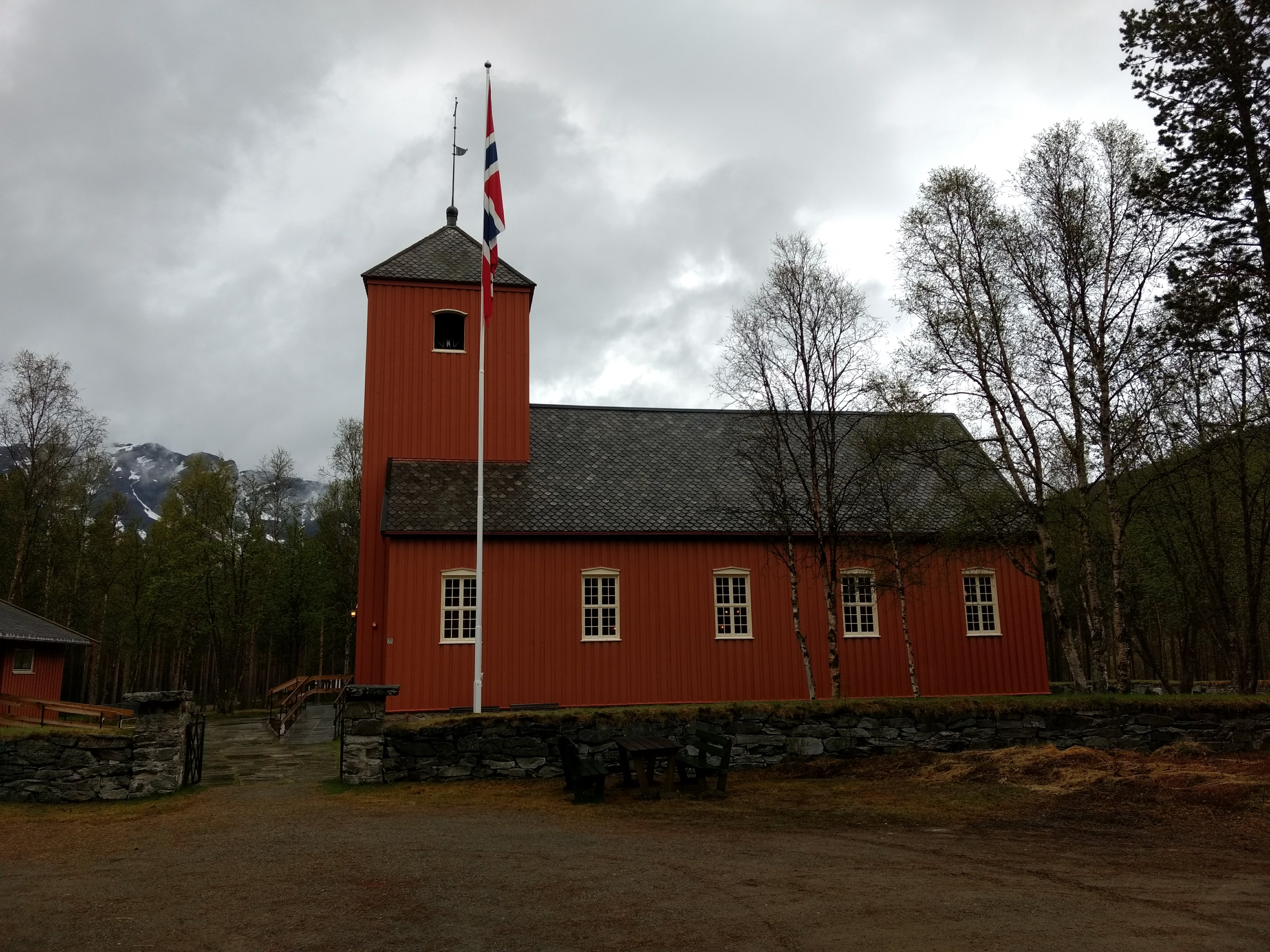
- View of the church (c. 1932)
- Rotsund Chapel
- 69.788302°N 20.708005°E
- Location: Nordreisa, Troms
- Country: Norway
- Denomination: Church of Norway
- Churchmanship: Evangelical Lutheran

History
- Status: Parish church
- Founded: 1932
- Consecrated: 18 Sept 1932

Architecture
- Functional status: Active
- Architect: Harald Sund
- Architectural type: Long church
- Completed: 1932 (94 years ago)

Specifications
- Capacity: 240
- Materials: Wood

Administration
- Diocese: Nord-Hålogaland
- Deanery: Nord-Troms prosti
- Parish: Nordreisa
- Norwegian Cultural Heritage Site
- Type: Church
- Status: Listed
- ID: 85319

Rotsund Chapel (Norwegian: Rotsund kapell) is a parish church of the Church of Norway in Nordreisa Municipality in Troms county, Norway. It is located in the village of Rotsund. It is one of the two churches for the Nordreisa parish which is part of the Nord-Troms prosti (deanery) in the Diocese of Nord-Hålogaland. The red, wooden church was built in a long church style in 1932. The building cost a total of 40,200 kr and it was designed by the Oslo architect Harald Sund. The church seats about 240 people.

== History ==
A cemetery was built in Rotsund in 1860 so that people didn't have to travel so far to bury their dead. Almost immediately, there was a desire by the local population to build a church alongside the new cemetery. In 1887, the municipal council in Skjervøy Municipality decided to build a church in the village (Rotsund was originally part of Skjervøy and later switched to Nordreisa Municipality). They petitioned the authorities to do so, but it was not until 1920 when a royal resolution authorized the construction of a chapel in Rotsund. Fundraising began for the chapel through collections and gifts as well as a 7000 kr grant from the government. Construction began in February 1932, and took only five months. The total cost of the chapel was 40,200 kr. The new building was consecrated on 18 September 1932 by the Bishop Eivind Berggrav. During World War II, the chapel was requisitioned by German forces and used as a barracks. During that time the altarpiece was destroyed, but the rest of the building only had minor damages. After the war in 1946, a new altarpiece was installed. In 1999, the interior of the chapel was completely renovated.

== Media gallery ==
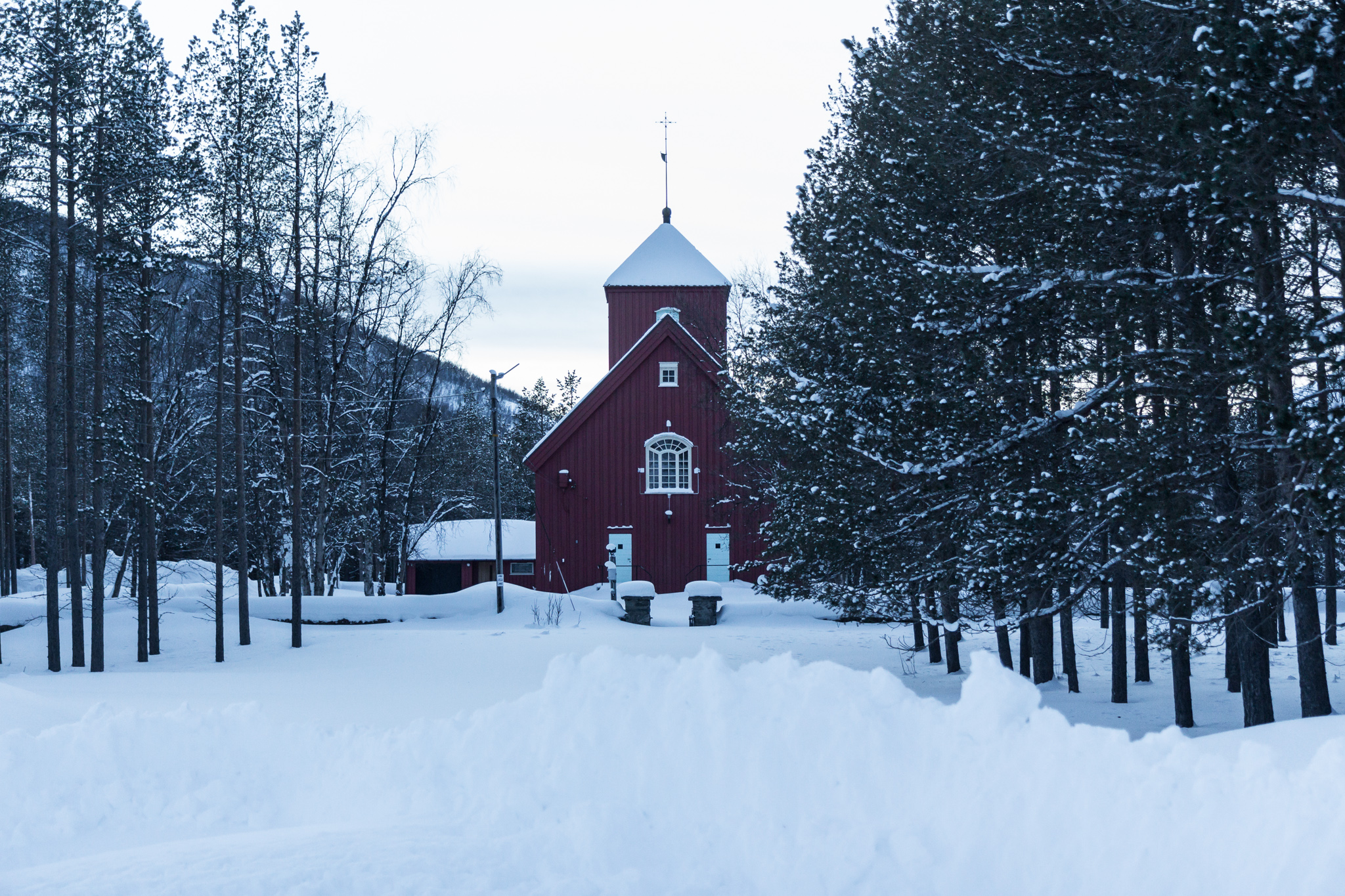

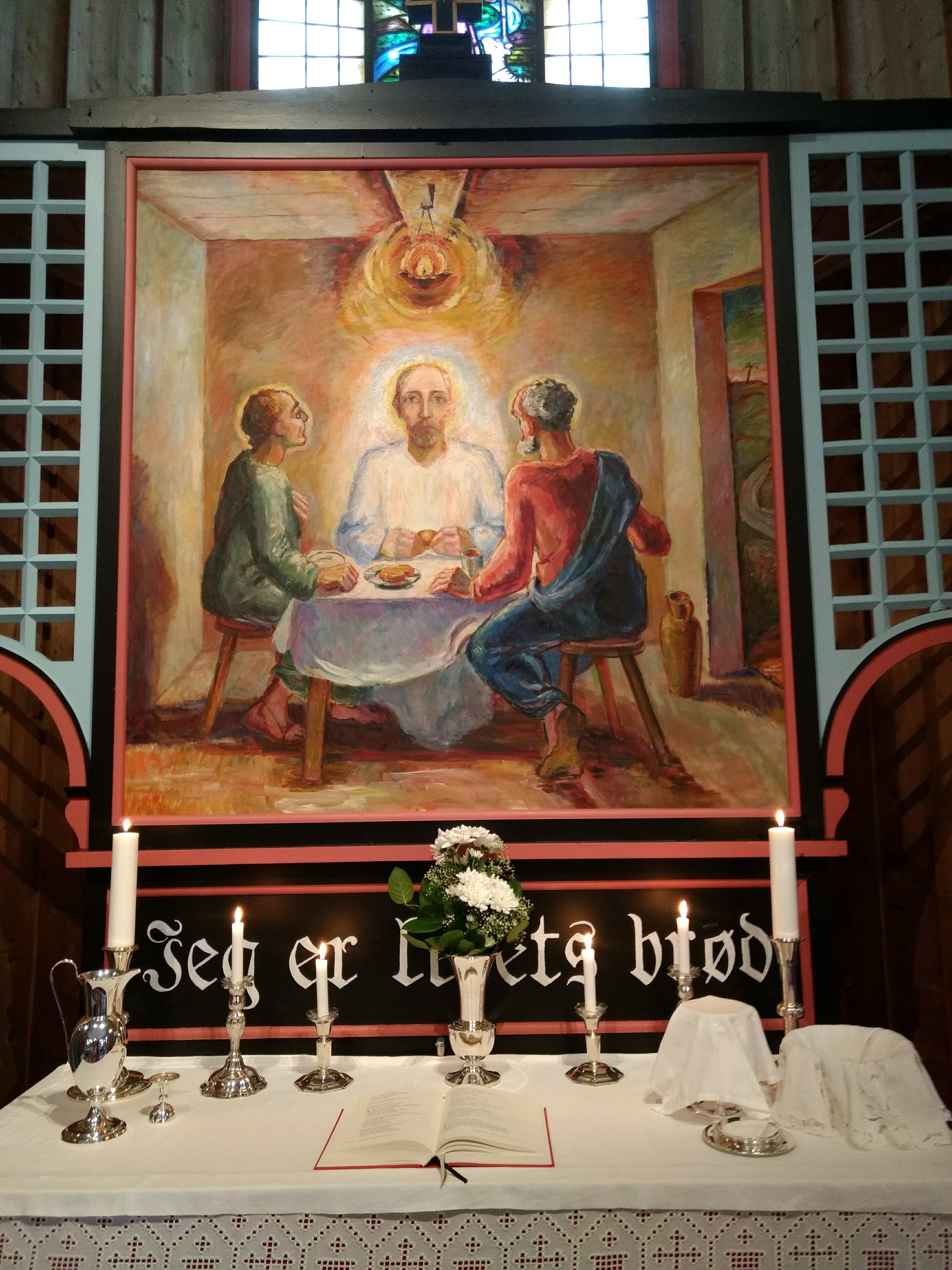

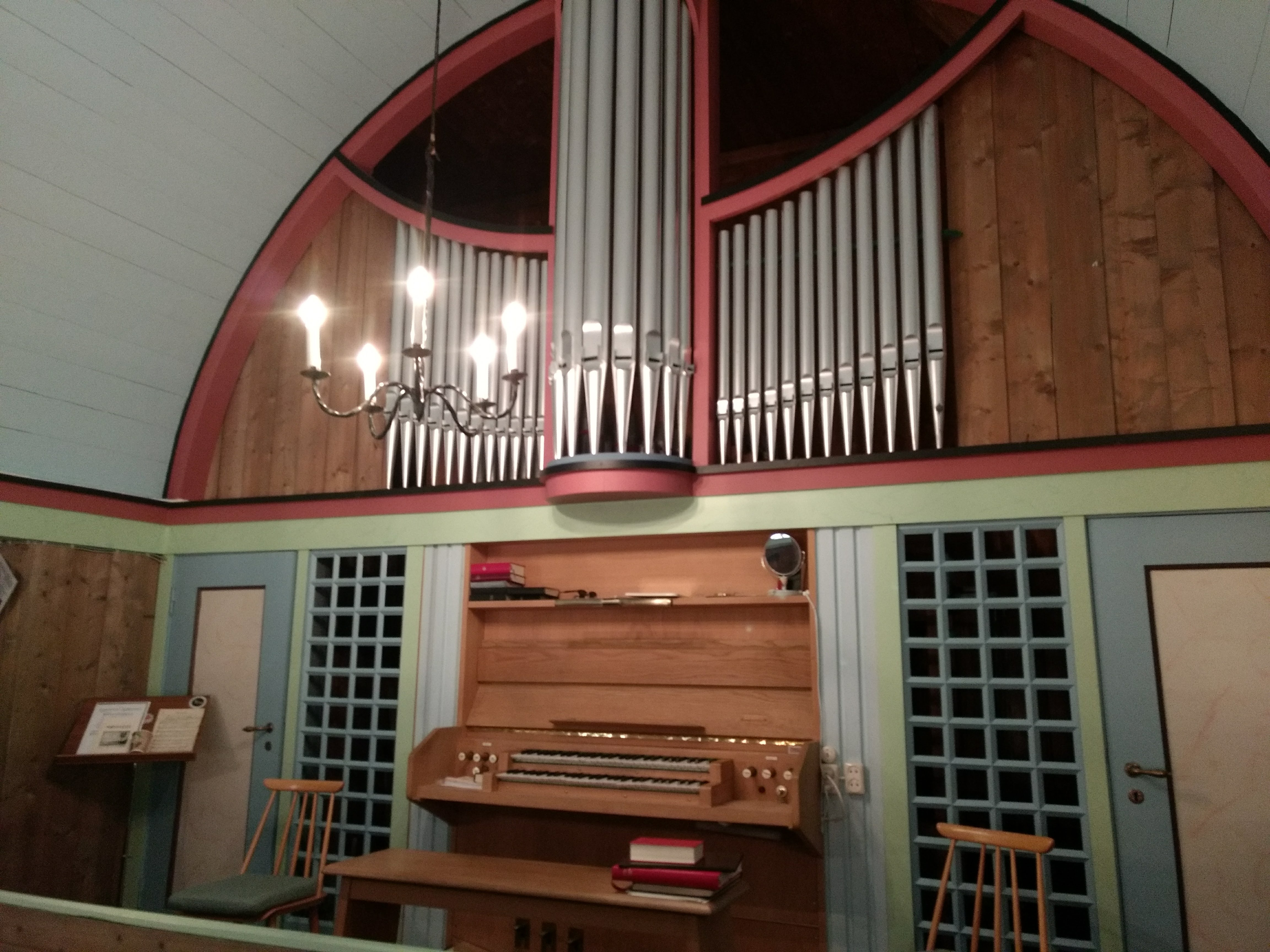

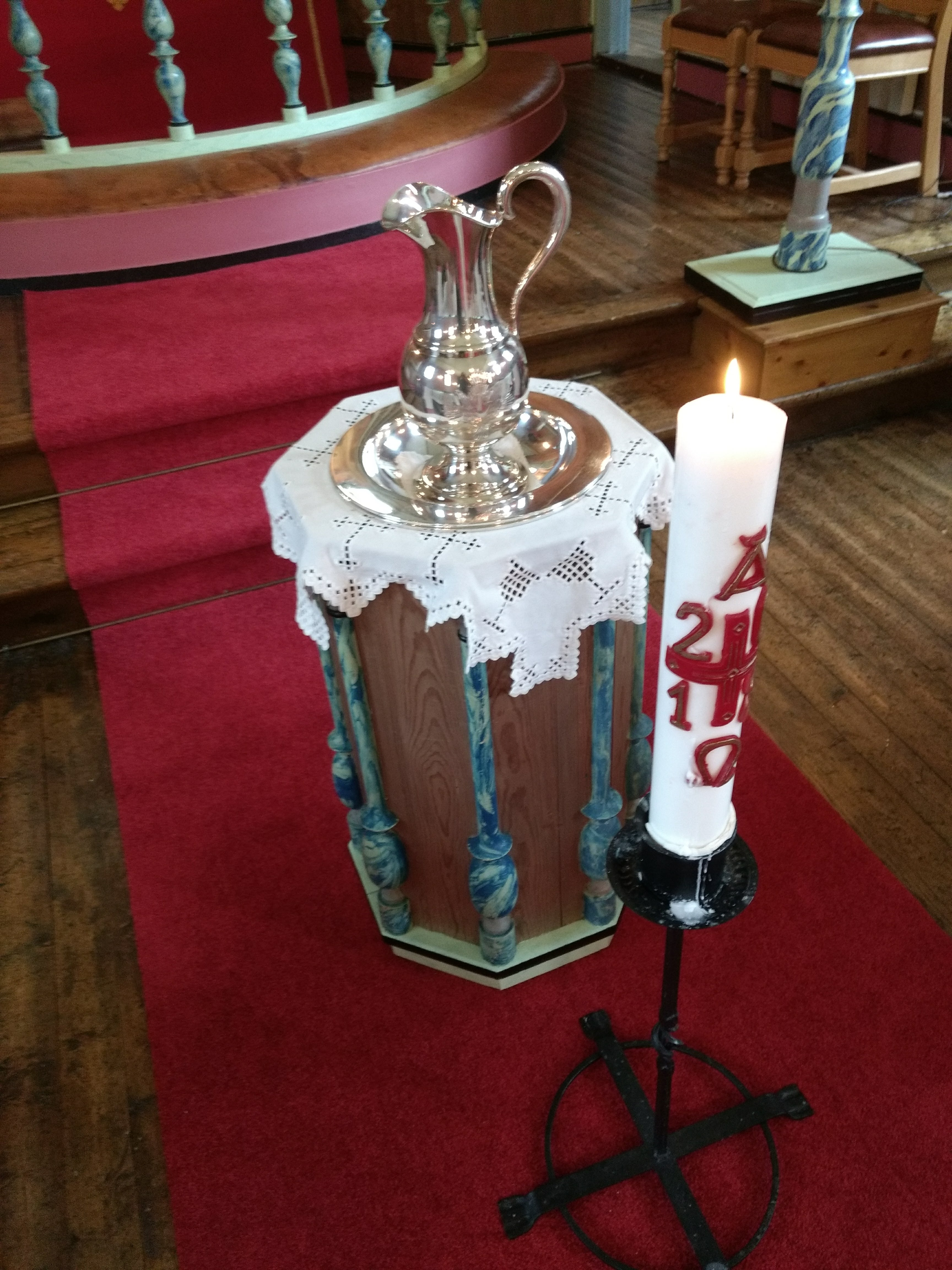

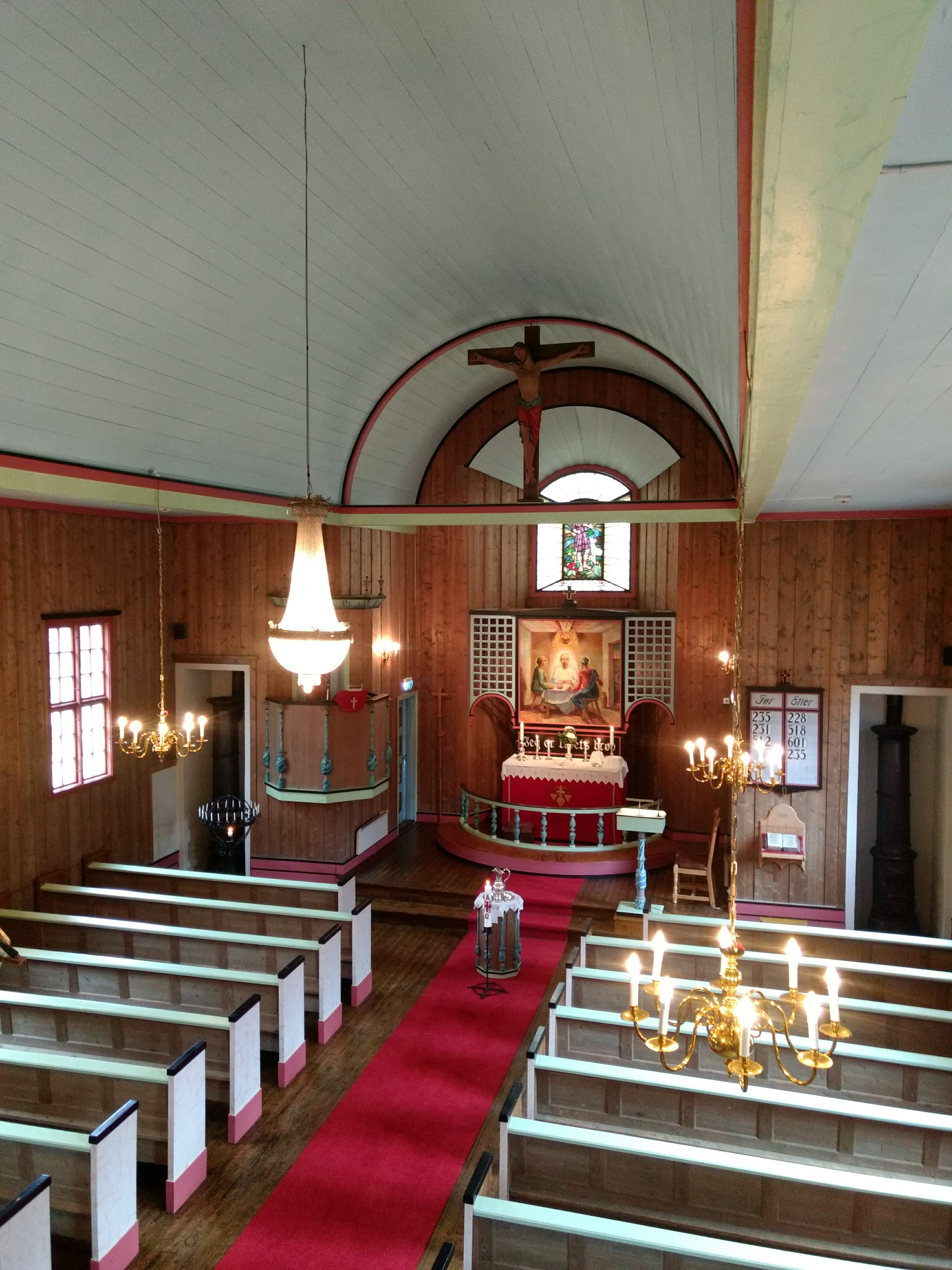

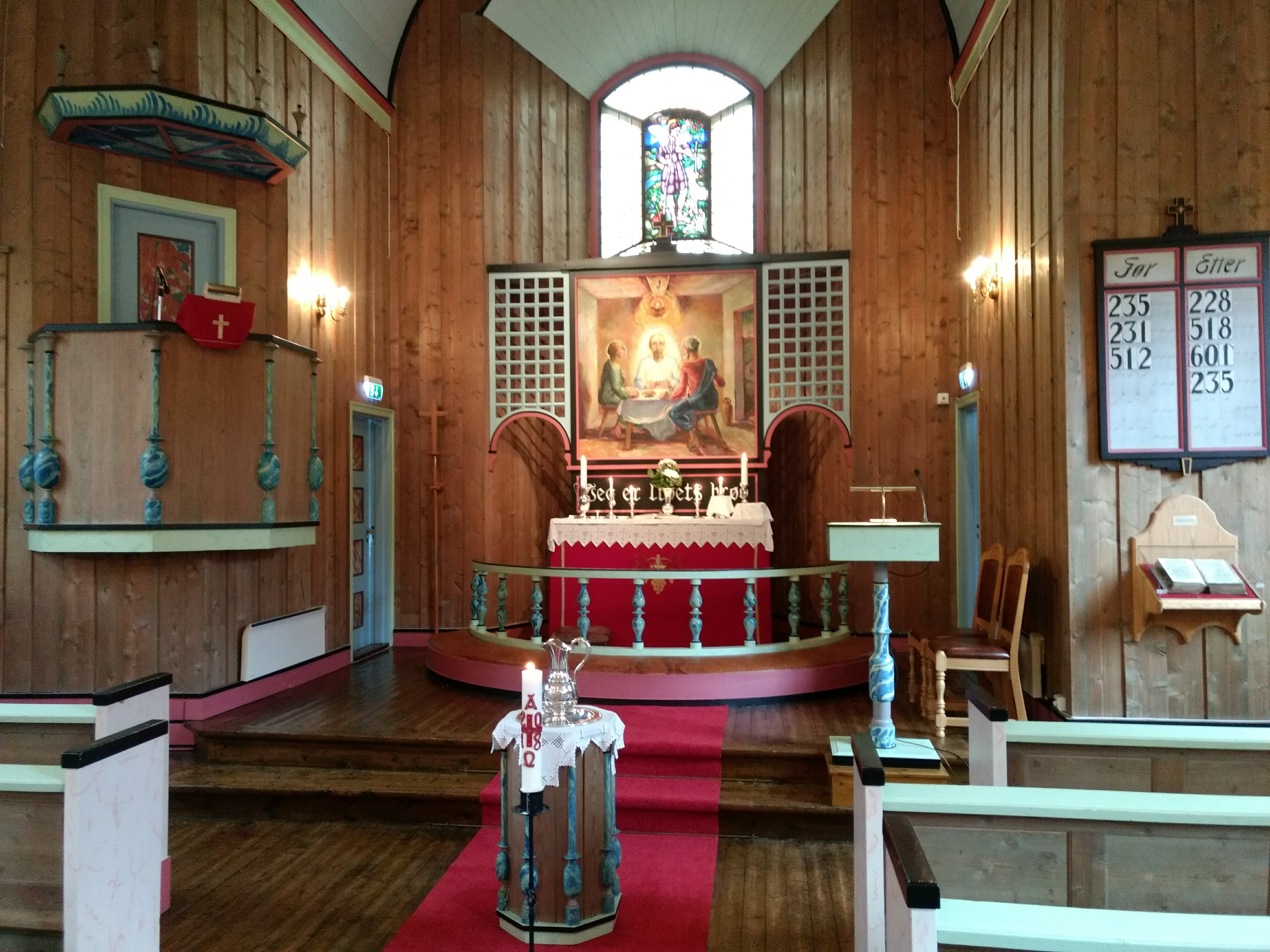

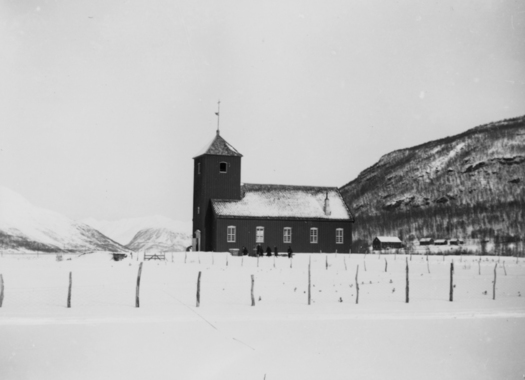

== See also ==
- List of churches in Nord-Hålogaland
