= Mary Elizabeth Atkins =

English painter

Mary Elizabeth Atkins (born in London) was an English painter of landscape, interiors and flowers.

Atkins studied at the Slade School and exhibited at the Royal Academy and the New English Art Club.

Her painting of the village of Chalford is in the collection of Leeds Art Gallery since 1927.
