= Frank Hughes (footballer, born 1909) =

Australian rules footballer, born 1909

Personal information
- Full name: Frank Hughes
- Born: 11 March 1909
- Died: 30 April 2002 (aged 93)

Playing career^{1}
Years	Club	Games (Goals)
1929	Footscray	2 (0)
- ^{1} Playing statistics correct to the end of 1929.

Frank Hughes (11 March 1909 – 30 April 2002) was a former Australian rules footballer who played with Footscray in the Victorian Football League (VFL).
