= Frank Hughes (artist) =

English painter

Frank Edward Burnham Hughes, N.E.A.C (1905–1987) was an English painter and member of the New English Art Club.

== Life and work ==
Frank Hughes was born at St Pancras, London. He studied at St Martin's School of Art in the 1920s and served in the British Army in WW2. In order to support himself he worked in administration for the London water board. He had an important friendship with the painter, Edward Bishop RBA, NEAC. Other contemporaries were Francis Gower, Brian Blow and Ronald Horton. He also worked with Marjorie Jenkins at and around Goosberry Cottage, Lindsey Tye, near Hadleigh Suffolk.

His partner in later years was Kathleen Haacke, MBE. He travelled with her in Italy and France, producing on their travels drawings and watercolours of landscapes and cafés: these formed the basis of subsequent paintings, often, like his portraits, dark and small.

He had a hatred of the Establishment and was very left wing in his outlook. He spent most of his life in Hampstead and North London, working from a studio in Muswell Hill for 25 years. He suffered from emphysema as a result of heavy smoking, when he worked his way from a cigarette through a cigar to a pipe. He died in Hampstead in 1987.

== Exhibitions ==
He exhibited Winter Landscape at the Royal Academy in 1954 (Gallery #4); Landscape from a Window in 1955 (Gallery #1 alongside Sir Winston Churchill, Sir Alfred Munnings, Sir Gerald Kelly, Sr William Russell Flint, James Fitton, Stanley Spencer and Henry Lamb). Additionally, Dorset Landscape was exhibited at the Royal Academy in 1961.
