= Ruth Lowinsky =

Ruth J. Emilie Lowinsky (née Hirsch; 1893–1958) was an English society hostess and food writer. Her husband, the surrealist Thomas Esmond Lowinsky, provided illustrations for her first book, Lovely Food (1931), published by the Nonesuch Press on hand-made paper.

== Life ==
Lowinsky was the daughter of Leopold Hirsch (1867–1932), a London banker and art collector. She studied at the Slade School of Fine Art before giving up painting on her marriage, and setting up home in Kensington Square. A friend of Rebecca West and Raymond Mortimer, she died in January 1958.

== Works ==
- Lovely food: a cookery notebook, London: The Nonesuch Press, 1931. Illustrated with line drawings by Thomas Lowinsky.
- More lovely food, London: The Nonesuch Press, 1935
- What's cooking? recipes for the keen and thrifty, London: Secker & Warburg, 1945
- Food for pleasure: an anthology of recipes, London: Hart-Davis, 1950. Dedicated to Ethel Sands and Raymond Mortimer.
- Russian food for pleasure, modern recipes, London: Hart-Davis, 1953
