= Thomas Esmond Lowinsky =

English painter

- Born: 2 March 1892
- Died: 24 April 1947 (aged 55)
- Education: Eton College
- Alma mater: Trinity College, Oxford; Slade School of Fine Art
- Known for: Painting

Thomas Esmond Lowinsky (2 March 1892 – 24 April 1947) was an English painter of Hungarian and South African descent.

Born in India on 2 March 1892, the son of Thomas Herman Lowinsky of Tittenhurst, Sunninghill, Berkshire and elder brother to author and philanthropist Xenia Field, Lowinsky grew up in England and was educated at Eton and at Trinity College, Oxford before studying at the Slade School of Fine Art from 1912 to 1914. Following service in France during World War I, Lowinsky continued painting, holding his first one-man exhibition at the Leicester Galleries in 1926. He was a member of the New English Art Club from 1926 to 1942. Lowinsky's work was primarily portraiture, but he also painted fantasy scenes. Amongst the books for which he provided illustrations was Edith Sitwell's Elegy on Dead Fashion.

Lowinsky married Ruth Jeanette Hirsch in 1919; their children were Katherine Mary (b. 1920), wife of Lancelot George Thirkell, son of the novelist Angela Thirkell; (Thomas) Martin Francis Esmond (1922-1944), killed whilst a lieutenant in the Scots Guards; Claire Marie Claude (b. 1925); and Justin Mark Esmond (b. 1929), who also served in the Scots Guards as a second lieutenant from 1948 to 1949. Lowinsky died in London on 24 April 1947; a memorial exhibition was held in 1949 at Wildenstein's. Subsequent exhibitions have been held at the Graves Art Gallery in Sheffield (1981) and the Tate Gallery (1990).

His works include The Mask of Flora (1931), The Offering of Cain and Offering of Abel (1932), and portraits of Miss Cicely Hamilton (1926), Miss Jean Brady (1933) and Miss Avril Turner (1937).
