= New English Art Club =

Art organization in London

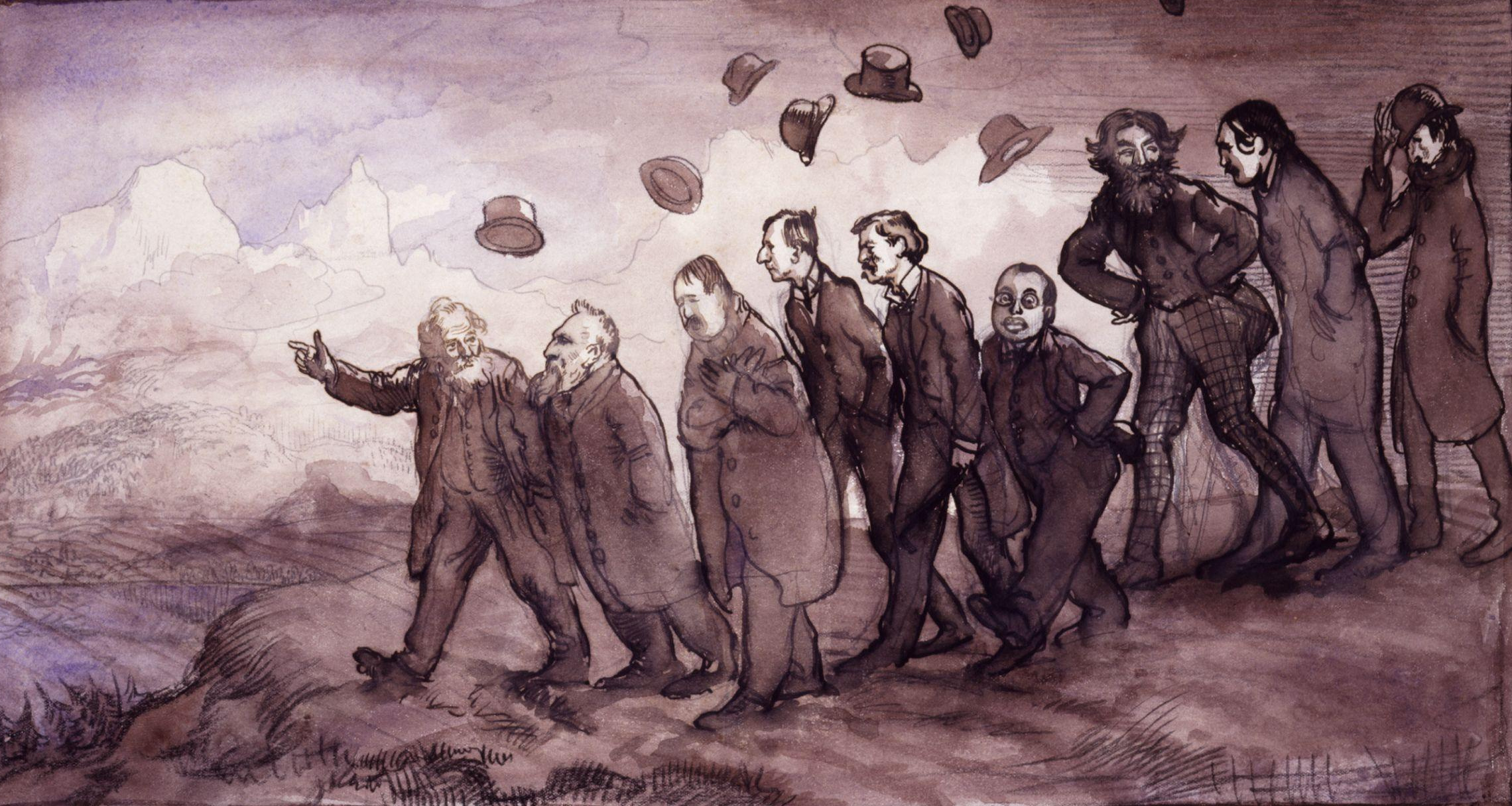
Portrait of members of the New English Art Club, by William Orpen. From left to right: Alphonse Legros, Auguste Rodin, Philip Wilson Steer, Henry Tonks, Frederick Brown, William Rothenstein, Augustus John, Charles Conder, Dugald Sutherland MacColl

The New English Art Club (NEAC) is a society for contemporary artists that was founded in London, England, in 1886 as an alternative venue to the Royal Academy. The NEAC holds an annual exhibition of paintings and drawings at the Mall Galleries in London, exhibiting works by both members and artists from Britain and abroad whose work has been selected from an annual open submission.

== History ==
Young English artists returning from studying art in Paris, France, mounted the first exhibition of the New English Art Club in April 1886. Among them were William Laidlay, Thomas Cooper Gotch, Frank Bramley, John Singer Sargent, Philip Wilson Steer, George Clausen and Stanhope Forbes. Another founding member was George Percy Jacomb-Hood. An early name suggested for the group was the "Society of Anglo-French Painters", which gives some indication of their origins. As a note in the catalogue to their first exhibition explained, "This Club consists of 50 Members, who are more or less united in their art sympathies. They have associated themselves together with the view of holding an Annual Exhibition, hoping that a collective display of their works, which has hitherto been impossible, will prove not only of interest to the public, but will better explain the aim and method of their art."

The Society held regular Spring and Autumn exhibitions, a number of which were held at the Egyptian Hall in Piccadilly, London, until its demolition in 1905.

The Impressionist style was well represented at the NEAC, in comparison to the old-school academic art shown at the Royal Academy. For a time, the NEAC was seen as a stepping-stone to Royal Academy membership. Today the NEAC continues in a realistic, figurative style, while the Royal Academy has embraced abstract and conceptual art.

NEAC members include Peter Brown, Frederick Cuming, Anthony Green, Ken Howard, Charles Williams, Richard Bawden and Martin Yeoman.

Historic NEAC members and exhibitors include: Thomas Kennington (founder member and first secretary), Prof Fred Brown (founder member), Frank Bramley (foundation member), Walter Sickert, Jacques-Émile Blanche, William Orpen, Augustus John, Gwen John, Ambrose McEvoy, Philip Wilson Steer, Henry Tonks, James Whitelaw Hamilton, Alfred William Rich, James Dickson Innes, Margaret Preston, Charles Wellington Furse, Katie Edith Gliddon, Ethel Walker, Fairlie Harmar, William Rothenstein, Lindsay Bernard Hall, Thomas Cooper Gotch, Mary Sargant Florence, Henry Strachey, Clare Atwood, Evelyn Dunbar, Eve Garnett, Frank McEwen, James Jebusa Shannon, Cecil Mary Leslie, Mary Elizabeth Atkins, William Brown Macdougall, Neville Bulwer-Lytton, 3rd Earl of Lytton, Muirhead Bone, Robert Polhill Bevan, Dugald Sutherland MacColl, Neville Lewis, Charles Holmes, Carron O Lodge, Geoffrey Tibble, Alexander Mann, Hercules Brabazon Brabazon, Thomas Esmond Lowinsky, Frank Hughes, Albert Julius Olsson, Helen Margaret Spanton, Margaret Green and Leslie Donovan Gibson.

The NEAC is one of the member societies of the Federation of British Artists. A history of the Society from its foundation to the year 2000 was written by the art historian Kenneth McConkey and published in 2006.

As of 2023, the president of NEAC is Patrick Cullen.

== Honorary life members ==
- William Bowyer
- Michael Brockway
- Bob Brown
- Fred Dubery
- Bernard Dunstan
- Charlotte Halliday
- Margaret Thomas

== See also ==
- Pre-Raphaelite Brotherhood
- Federation of British Artists
- Royal Academy
