= Frank Hughes Jr. =

Australian rules footballer

Frank Hughes, Jr.

Personal information
- Full name: Francis Vane Hughes, Junior.
- Born: 9 February 1921; Brunswick, Victoria
- Died: 1 April 2008 (aged 87)
- Original team: Richmond Amateurs
- Height: 180 cm (5 ft 11 in)
- Weight: 77 kg (170 lb)

Playing career^{1}
Years	Club	Games (Goals)
1944	Richmond	3 (0)
1945	Melbourne	8 (0)
1946	Williamstown (VFA)	4 (0)
- ^{1} Playing statistics correct to the end of 1945.

Francis Vane Hughes Jr. (9 February 1921 – 1 April 2008) was an Australian rules footballer who played with Richmond and Melbourne in the Victorian Football League (VFL). He was the son of Australian Football Hall of Fame member Frank 'Checker' Hughes.
