= Lowinsky (band) =

Italian rock band

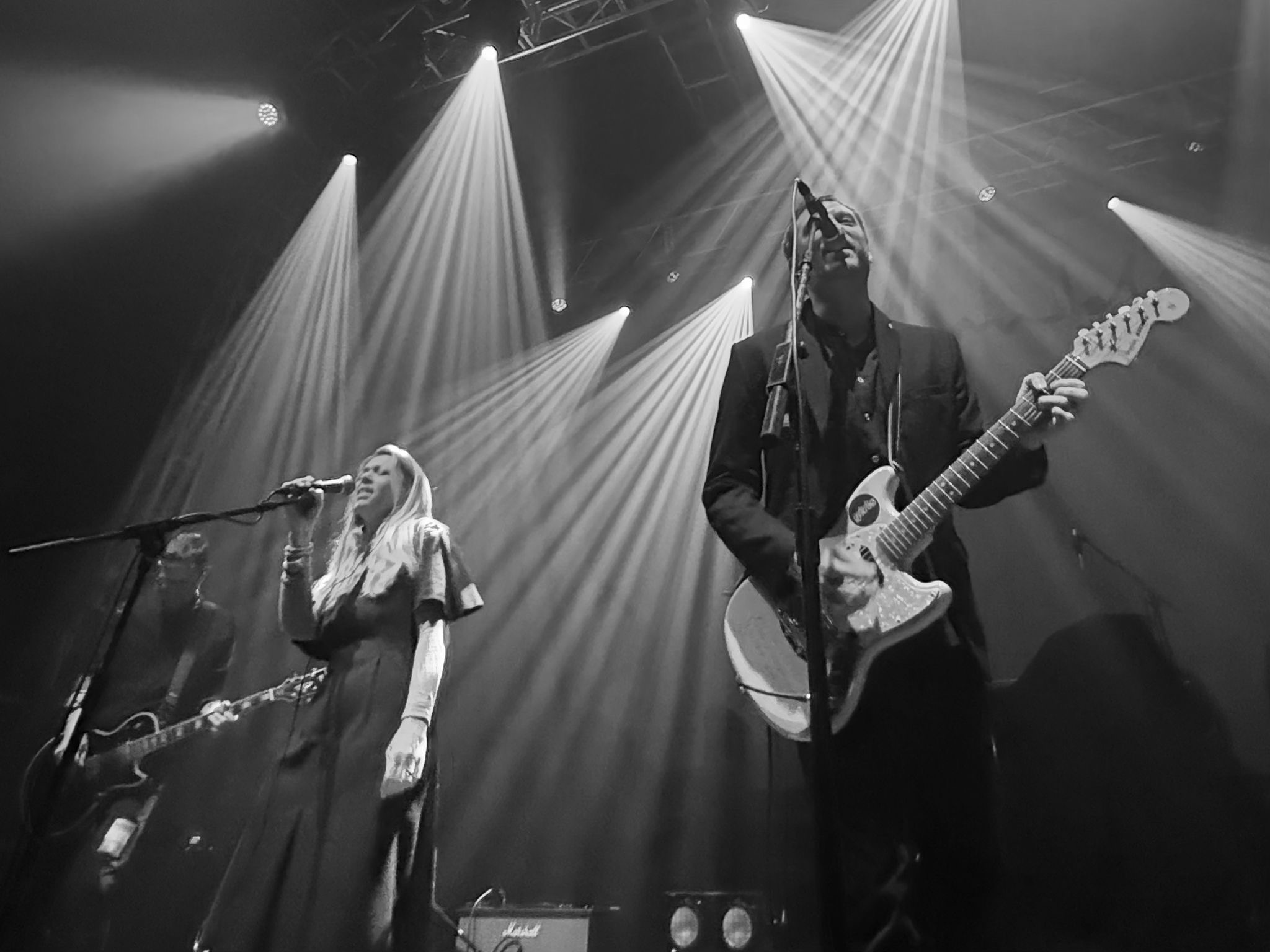
- Live at O2 Academy, Leeds (Jess Bennett)

Background information
- Origin: Bergamo, Italy
- Genres: Indie rock, alternative rock
- Years active: 2017 – present
- Labels: Moquette Records; Gasterecords; RocketMan Records; Waddafuzz Records

Lowinsky are an indie rock band from Bergamo, Italy, active since 2017. The band are known for opening shows for international artists including Babyshambles and Nada Surf, as well as performances alongside Robyn Hitchcock and Bar Italia.

== History ==
Lowinsky began as a musical project led by Carlo Pinchetti, following his previous work with the bands Daisy Chains and Finistère, and a solo acoustic release under his own name. Over time, the project developed into a full band with various collaborators, including Linda Gandolfi (vocals), Elena Ghisleri (cello), Davide Tassetti (guitar), and Federico Inguscio (drums).

The band has maintained an active live presence in Italy and abroad. Lowinsky opened for Babyshambles during the band's 2025 UK tour (as the only non local act), at the O2 Academy Leeds in December 2025. They have also appeared with Nada Surf at live concerts in Italy.

In September 2023, Lowinsky released a 7-inch split single with Helsinki, the solo project of Irish musician Drew McConnell, known for his work as the bass guitarist and backing vocalist with Babyshambles. The split record was issued by RocketMan Records and features Lowinsky’s track “Doppio Gioco” with Helsinki’s “Homo Nymph” on the B-side.

In 2026 Lowinsky were invited by Babyshambles as openers for both their concerts on the Italian leg of the tour, 7th October in Rome, Orion Live Club and 8th October at Alcatraz in Milan. In Rome Pete Doherty and McConnell joined the band on stage to perform a cover rendition of the classic Blitzkrieg Bop by the Ramones.

In December 2023, the band released the mini-album Triste Sbaglio Sempre Lontani through Moquette Records and Gasterecords. The release is a concept work inspired by themes of distance and emotional reflection through the work of Italian writer Dino Buzzati.

Lowinsky’s third full-length album, Alice inizia a capire, was released on 19 September 2025 via Waddafuzz Records and RocketMan Records.

The song “Brucia” is the lead single from Alice Inizia a Capire.The music video accompanying the song, directed by Italian photographer Carola Mancassola, acts like a visual diary of a real day the band spent in Milan, shot during their December 2024 live show at Santeria Toscana 31. In the video it is possible to spot a special cameo appearance by Matthew Caws, the lead singer of Nada Surf.

== Discography ==
Year	Title	Format	Label
2017	Lowinsky	EP	Moquette Records
2019	Divan	Single	Moquette Records
2020	Oggetti Smarriti	LP	Moquette Records
2023	Lowinsky / Helsinki	7" split	RocketMan Records
2023	Triste Sbaglio Sempre Lontani	Mini-album	Moquette Records / Gasterecords
2023	Rockit Vol. 1.36	Compilation appearance	—
2025	Alice inizia a capire	LP	Waddafuzz Records / RocketMan Records
