= Gimsøy =

Gimsøy or Gimsøya may refer to:

== Places ==
- Gimsøy, or Gimsøysand, a village in Vågan Municipality in Nordland county, Norway
- Gimsøy Municipality, a former municipality in Nordland county, Norway
- Gimsøya, an island and village area in Vågan Municipality in Nordland county, Norway
- Gimsøy Church, a church in Vågan Municipality in Nordland county, Norway
- Gimsøy Bridge, a bridge in Vågan Municipality in Nordland county, Norway
- Gimsøy Abbey, a historic abbey in Skien Municipality in Telemark county, Norway
- Gimsøy, Telemark, a village in Skien Municipality in Telemark county, Norway
- Gimsøy Church (Telemark), a church in Skien Municipality in Telemark county, Norway
