= Svolvær =

Town in Nordland, Norway

- Town / City
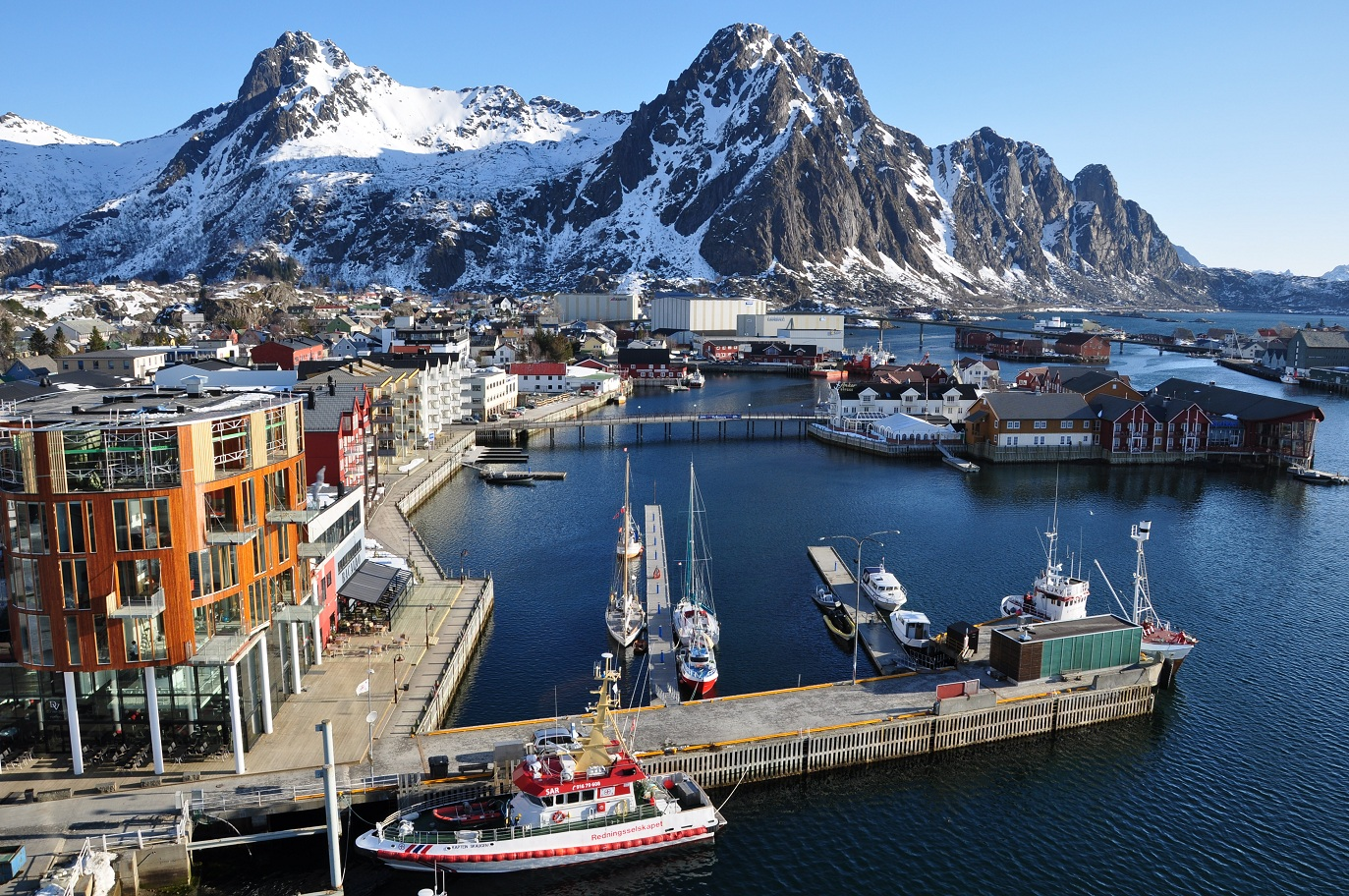
- View of the town
- Interactive map of Svolvær
- Location within Nordland Location within Norway
- Coordinates: 68.2353°N 14.5636°E
- Country: Norway
- Region: Northern Norway
- County: Nordland
- District: Lofoten
- Municipality: Vågan Municipality
- Established as
- Ladested: 1918–1964
- Town (By): 1996

Area
  - Total: 2.36 km^{2} (0.91 sq mi)
- Elevation: 3 m (9.8 ft)

Population (2023)
  - Total: 4,736
  - Density: 2,007/km^{2} (5,200/sq mi)
- Demonym: Svolværing
- Time zone: UTC+01:00 (CET)
  - Summer (DST): UTC+02:00 (CEST)
- Post Code: 8300 Svolvær
- Climate: Cfc
- Former municipality
- Svolvær ladested
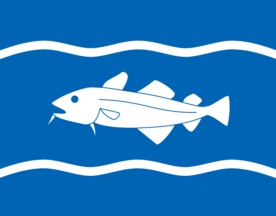
- Flag Coat of arms

- Location within Nordland Location within Norway
- Country: Norway
- County: Nordland
- District: Lofoten
- Established: 1918
  - Preceded by: Vågan Municipality
- Disestablished: 1 Jan 1964
  - Succeeded by: Vågan Municipality
- Administrative centre: Svolvær

Government
  - Mayor (1960–1963): Erik Bergsjø ((H))

Area
  - Total: 7.3 km^{2} (2.8 sq mi)
  - Rank: #644 in Norway

Population (1963)
  - Total: 3,918
  - Rank: #225 in Norway
  - Density: 536.7/km^{2} (1,390/sq mi)
  - Change (10 years): ▲ +11.3%

Official language
  - Norwegian form: Bokmål
- Time zone: UTC+01:00 (CET)
  - Summer (DST): UTC+02:00 (CEST)
- ISO 3166 code: NO-1806

Svolvær (Norwegian: [ˈsvôːlvæːr]), Suolvearra (Northern Sami), or Spålavuolle (Lule Sami) is a town and the administrative centre of Vågan Municipality in Nordland County, Norway. It is located on the island of Austvågøya in the Lofoten archipelago, along the Vestfjorden. The 2.36-square-kilometre (580-acre) town has a population (2023) of 4,736 and a population density of 2,007 inhabitants per square kilometre (5,200/sq mi).

== History ==
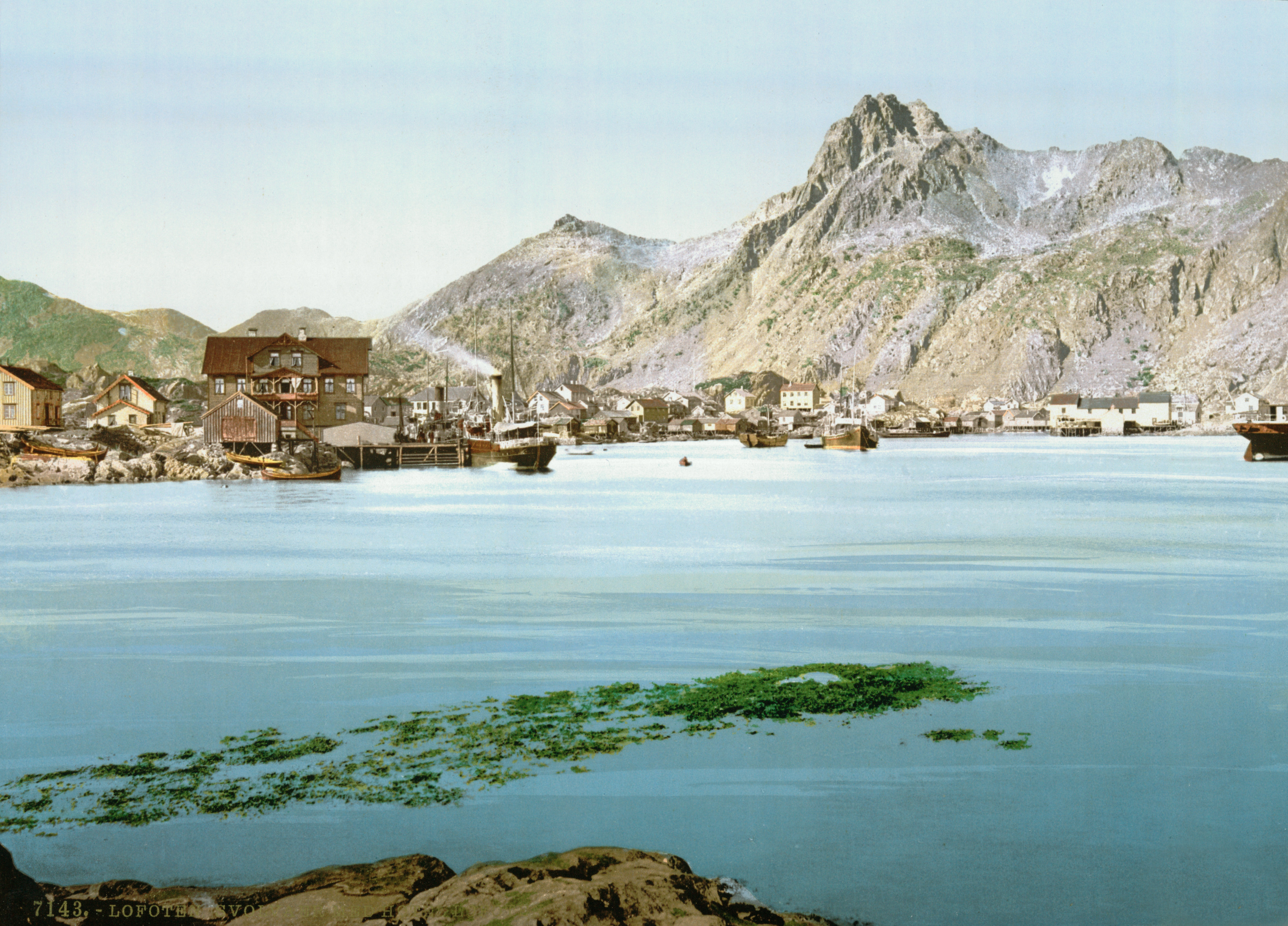
Svolvær around 1890

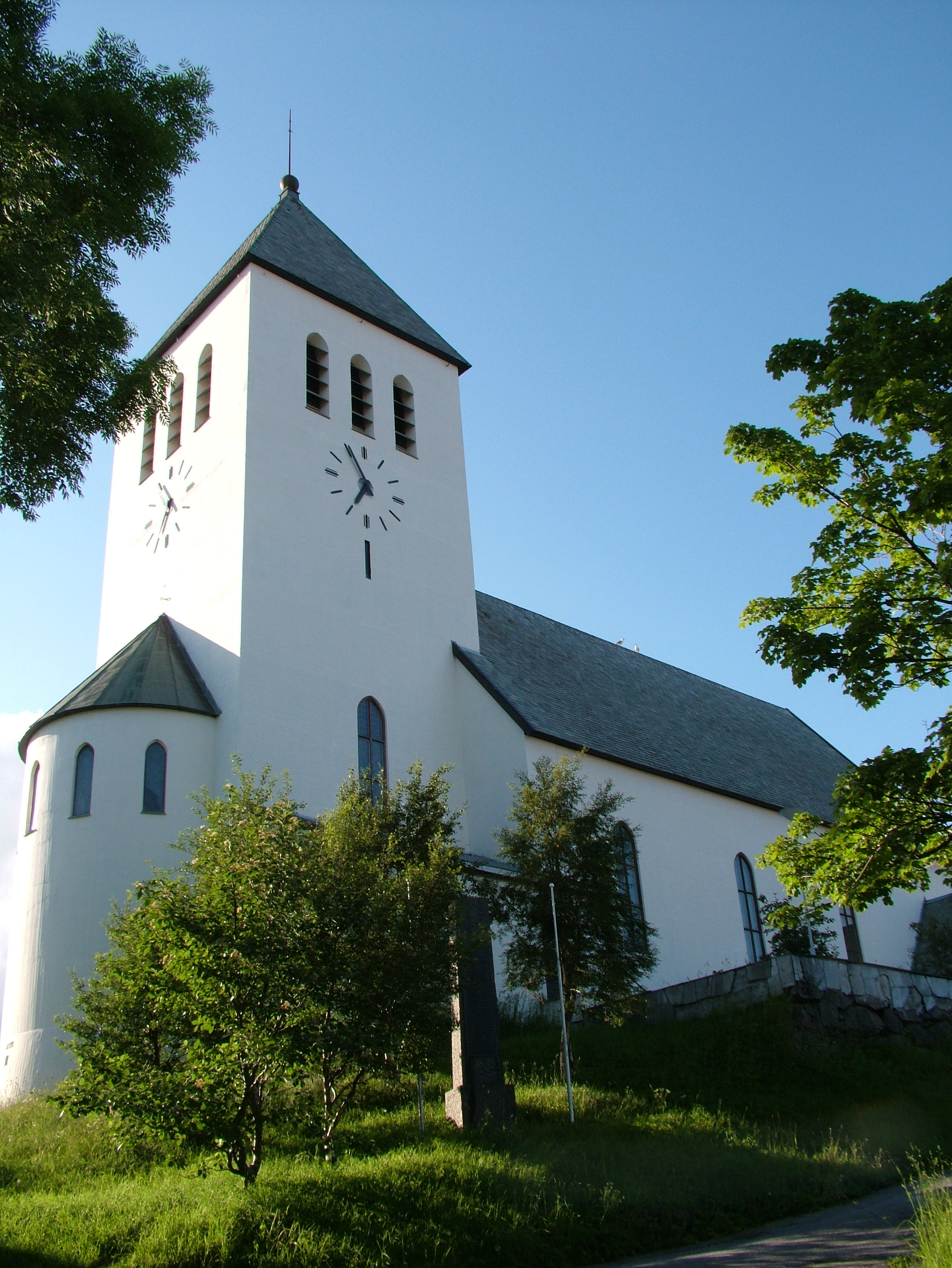
Svolvær Church

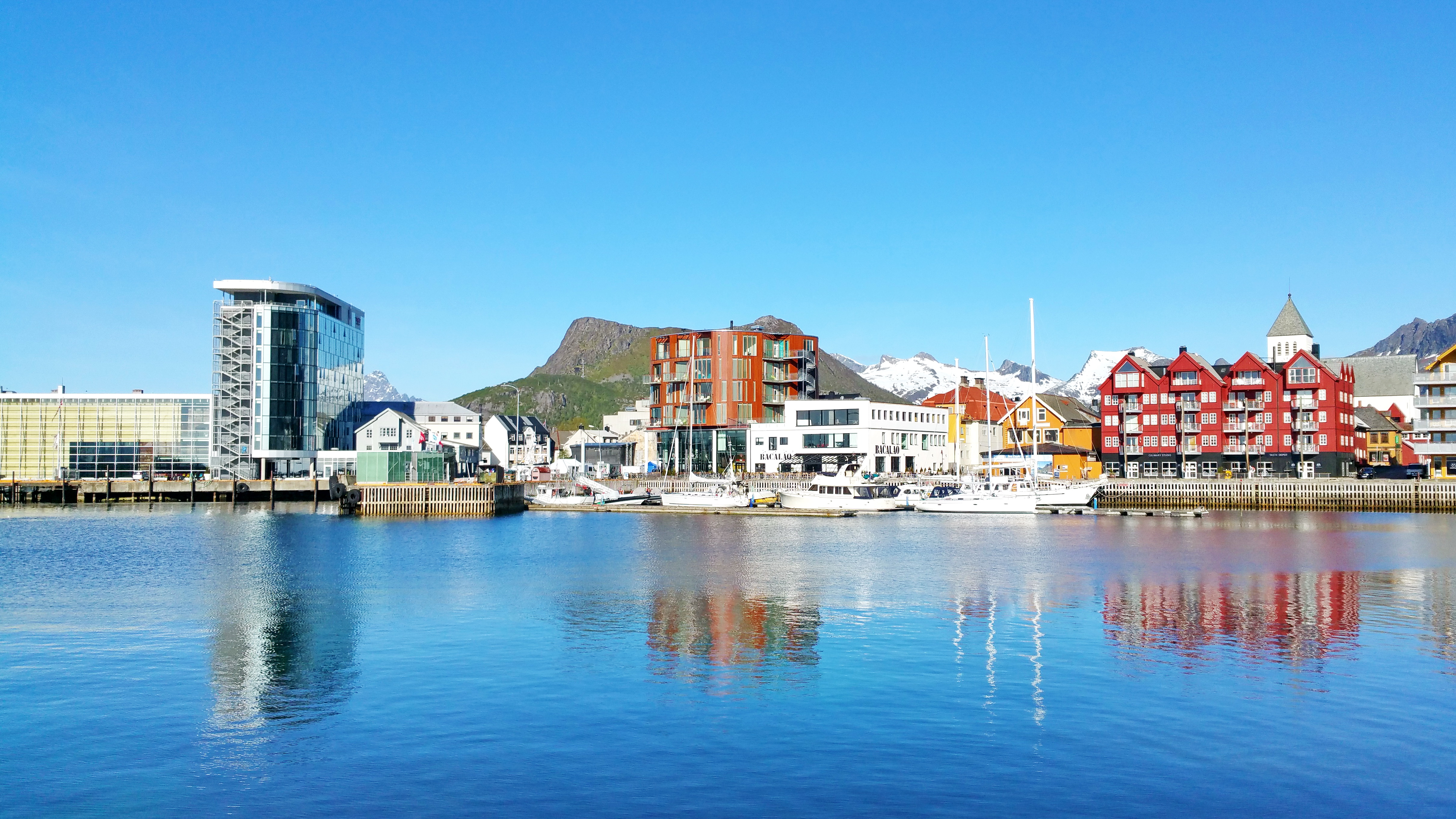
Port and center view of Svolvær in June 2016

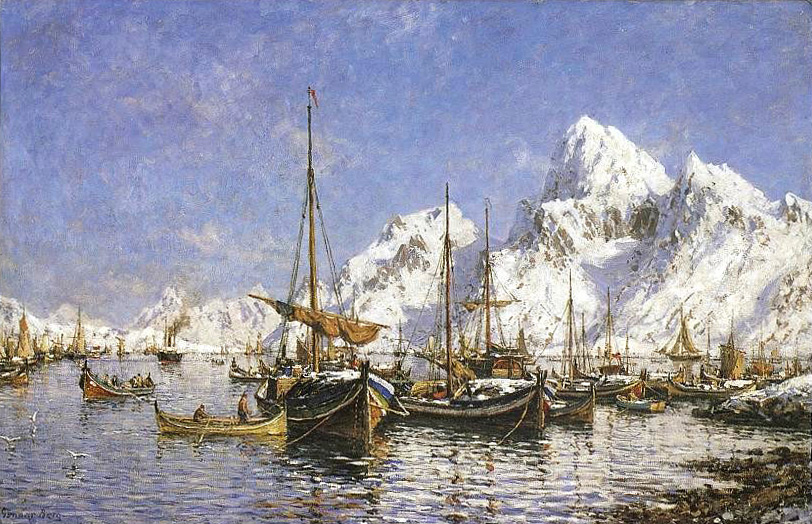
From Svolvær harbor by Gunnar Berg

The first town formation known in North Norway, Vågar, was situated around the narrow, natural harbor near Kabelvåg, just west of Svolvær. Vågar is mentioned in the book Heimskringla, and might have been established as early as the year 800 AD.

Atlantic Cod fisheries, particularly during winter months, have remained one of the most important economical foundations for the town. Other industries which have proved to be valuable resources for Vågan are fish farming (salmon), Secora and Lofotkraft.

=== Name ===
The town (and former municipality) is named after the old Svolvær farm (Old Norse: Svǫlver) since the town grew up on the site of the historic farm. In 1567, historical records show the name as "Suoluer". The first element of the name comes from the word svalr which means "cool" or "chilly". The last element is vær which means "fishing village".

=== Coat of arms ===
The coat of arms was granted on 20 January 1941 and it was in use until 1964 when it became part of Vågan Municipality. The official blazon is "Azure, a cod naiant argent in between a bar gemel wavy" (Norwegian: På blå bunn en vannrett sølv torsk mellom to bølgede strenger av sølv). This means the arms have a blue field (background) and the charge is a cod in between two wavy lines. The cod and wavy lines both have a tincture of argent which means it is commonly colored white, but if it is made out of metal, then silver is used. The blue color and the design of the arms symbolize the importance of the sea and fishing for the municipality. The arms were designed by John Johnsen.

=== Municipal self-government 1918-1963 ===
Svolvær's historical significance as an important fishing village allowed the town to be granted town status (ladested) on 1 July 1918. Upon becoming a town, it was separated from Vågan Municipality to become its own municipality. Initially, the new municipality had 2,429 residents, and it included 7.3 square kilometres (2.8 sq mi) of land. During the 1960s, there were many municipal mergers across Norway due to the work of the Schei Committee. On 1 January 1964, Svolvær Municipality (population: 3,952) was merged with the neighboring Gimsøy Municipality (population: 1,551) and Vågan Municipality (population: 4,820) to form the new, larger Vågan Municipality.

Due to this merger in 1964, Svolvær lost its status as a "town" (ladested). Following new legislation in Norway in 1996, the municipal council of Vågan Municipality voted to make Svolvær a "town" once again.

Svolvær was a self-governing municipality from 1916 until 1964. While it existed, Svolvær Municipality was responsible for primary education (through 10th grade), outpatient health services, senior citizen services, welfare and other social services, zoning, economic development, and municipal roads and utilities. The municipality is governed by a municipal council of directly elected representatives. The mayor is indirectly elected by a vote of the municipal council. The municipality was under the jurisdiction of the Hålogaland Court of Appeal.

==== Municipal council ====
The municipal council (Bystyre) of Svolvær Municipality was made up of 29 representatives that were elected to four year terms. The tables below show the historical composition of the council by political party.

Svolvær bystyre 1959–1963
Party name (in Norwegian)	Number of representatives
Labour Party (Arbeiderpartiet)	9
Conservative Party (Høyre)	7
Liberal Party (Venstre)	5
Local List(s) (Lokale lister)	8
Total number of members:	29
Note: On 1 January 1964, Svolvær Municipality became part of Vågan Municipality.

Svolvær bystyre 1955–1959
Party name (in Norwegian)	Number of representatives
Labour Party (Arbeiderpartiet)	15
Conservative Party (Høyre)	10
Liberal Party (Venstre)	4
Total number of members:	29

Svolvær bystyre 1951–1955
Party name (in Norwegian)	Number of representatives
Labour Party (Arbeiderpartiet)	14
Conservative Party (Høyre)	9
Christian Democratic Party (Kristelig Folkeparti)	2
Liberal Party (Venstre)	3
Total number of members:	28

Svolvær bystyre 1947–1951
Party name (in Norwegian)	Number of representatives
Labour Party (Arbeiderpartiet)	13
Communist Party (Kommunistiske Parti)	2
Christian Democratic Party (Kristelig Folkeparti)	1
Liberal Party (Venstre)	3
Joint List(s) of Non-Socialist Parties (Borgerlige Felleslister)	9
Total number of members:	28

Svolvær bystyre 1945–1947
Party name (in Norwegian)	Number of representatives
Labour Party (Arbeiderpartiet)	10
Communist Party (Kommunistiske Parti)	2
Christian Democratic Party (Kristelig Folkeparti)	1
Liberal Party (Venstre)	1
Joint List(s) of Non-Socialist Parties (Borgerlige Felleslister)	4
Local List(s) (Lokale lister)	2
Total number of members:	20

Svolvær bystyre 1937–1941*
Party name (in Norwegian)	Number of representatives
Labour Party (Arbeiderpartiet)	9
Liberal Party (Venstre)	1
Joint List(s) of Non-Socialist Parties (Borgerlige Felleslister)	6
Local List(s) (Lokale lister)	4
Total number of members:	20
Note: Due to the German occupation of Norway during World War II, no elections were held for new municipal councils until after the war ended in 1945.

Svolvær bystyre 1934–1937
Party name (in Norwegian)	Number of representatives
Labour Party (Arbeiderpartiet)	9
Liberal Party (Venstre)	2
Joint List(s) of Non-Socialist Parties (Borgerlige Felleslister)	9
Total number of members:	20

==== Mayors ====
The mayor (Norwegian: ordfører) of Svolvær Municipality was the political leader of the municipality and the chairperson of the municipal council. Here is a list of people who have held this position:

- 1918–1922: Johan Edvard Paulsen (H)
- 1923–1923: Jens Westergaard (H)
- 1924–1924: Cordt Holtermann Valeur (H)
- 1925–1925: Jens Westergaard (H)
- 1926–1927: Cordt Holtermann Valeur (H)
- 1928–1928: Ole B. Moholdt (FV)
- 1929–1932: Cordt Holtermann Valeur (H)
- 1933–1934: Christian Hagen (H)
- 1935–1935: John Johns (H)
- 1936–1936: Alf Nielssen (Ap)
- 1937–1937: Jens Westergaard (H)
- 1938–1939: Erling Th. Heggelund (H)
- 1939–1942: Alf Nielssen (Ap)
- 1942–1943: Henrik Grønhaug (NS)
- 1943–1945: Anton Juel Myhre (NS)
- 1945–1945: Lauritz R. Urke (NS)
- 1945–1945: Willy Jansen (Ap)
- 1945–1945: Alf Nielssen (Ap)
- 1946–1951: Willy Jansen (Ap)
- 1952–1952: Christian Hagen (H)
- 1953–1953: Willy Jansen (Ap)
- 1954–1954: Christian Hagen (H)
- 1955–1955: Vidkun Ross (H)
- 1956–1957: Willy Jansen (Ap)
- 1958–1958: Ludvig Larsen (Ap)
- 1958–1959: Willy Jansen (Ap)
- 1960–1963: Erik Bergsjø (H)

== Economy ==
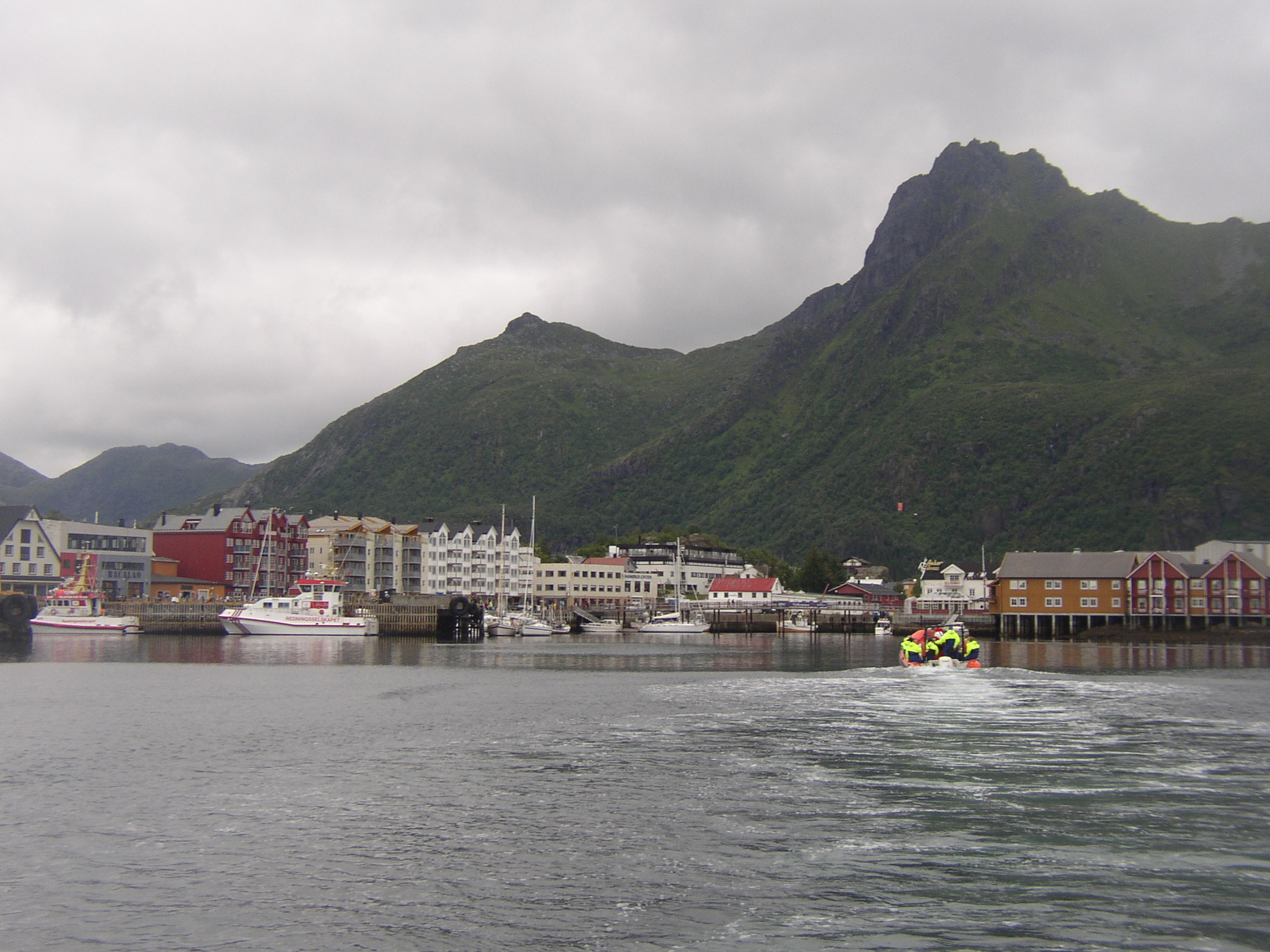
Svolvær harbor

Other than the massive fishing industry, tourism is becoming increasingly important. Svolvær is also a major transportation hub and favourite starting point for tourists visiting the Lofoten islands. Approximately 200,000 tourists visit Svolvær each year.

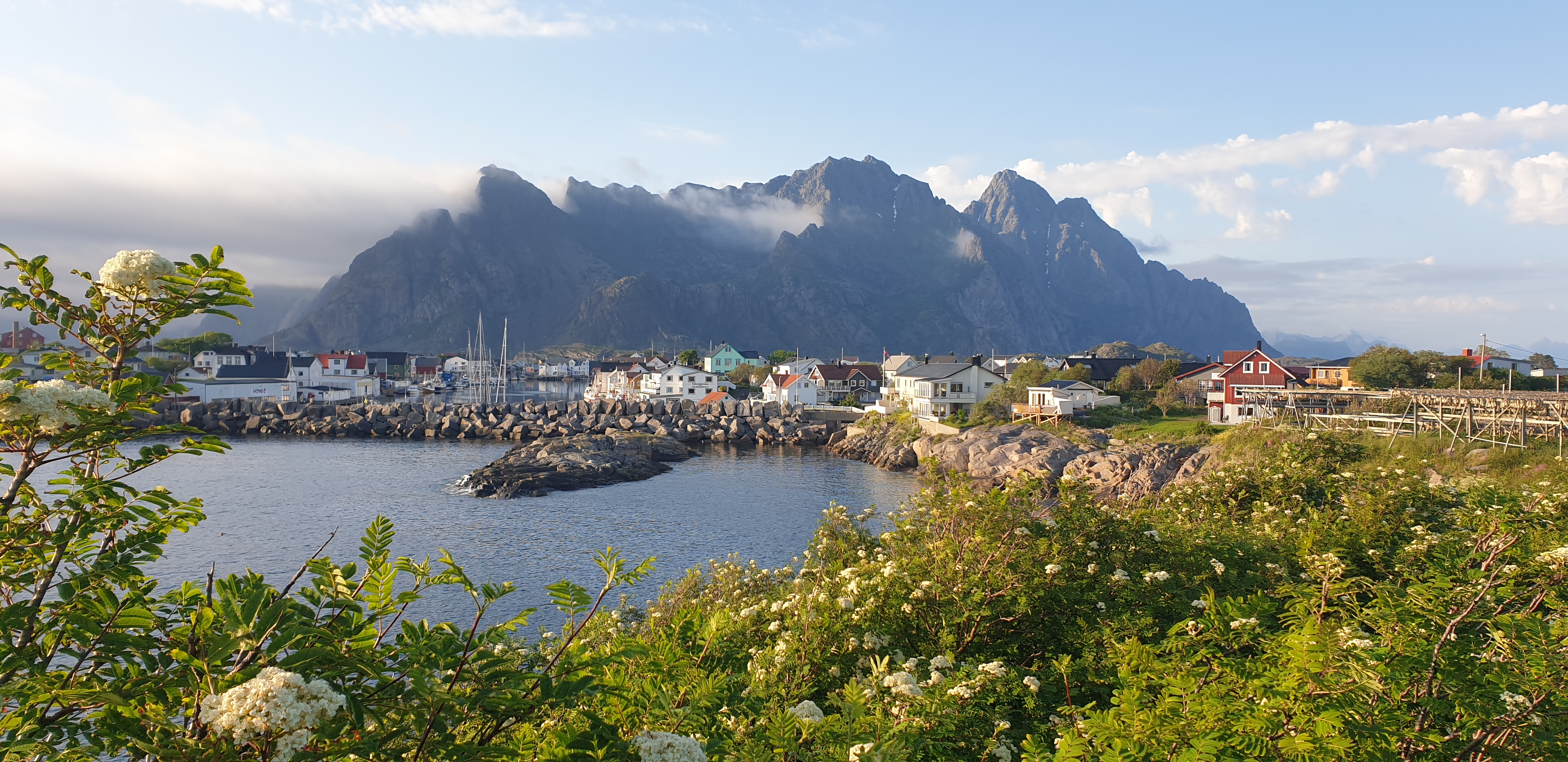
Svolvaer overview

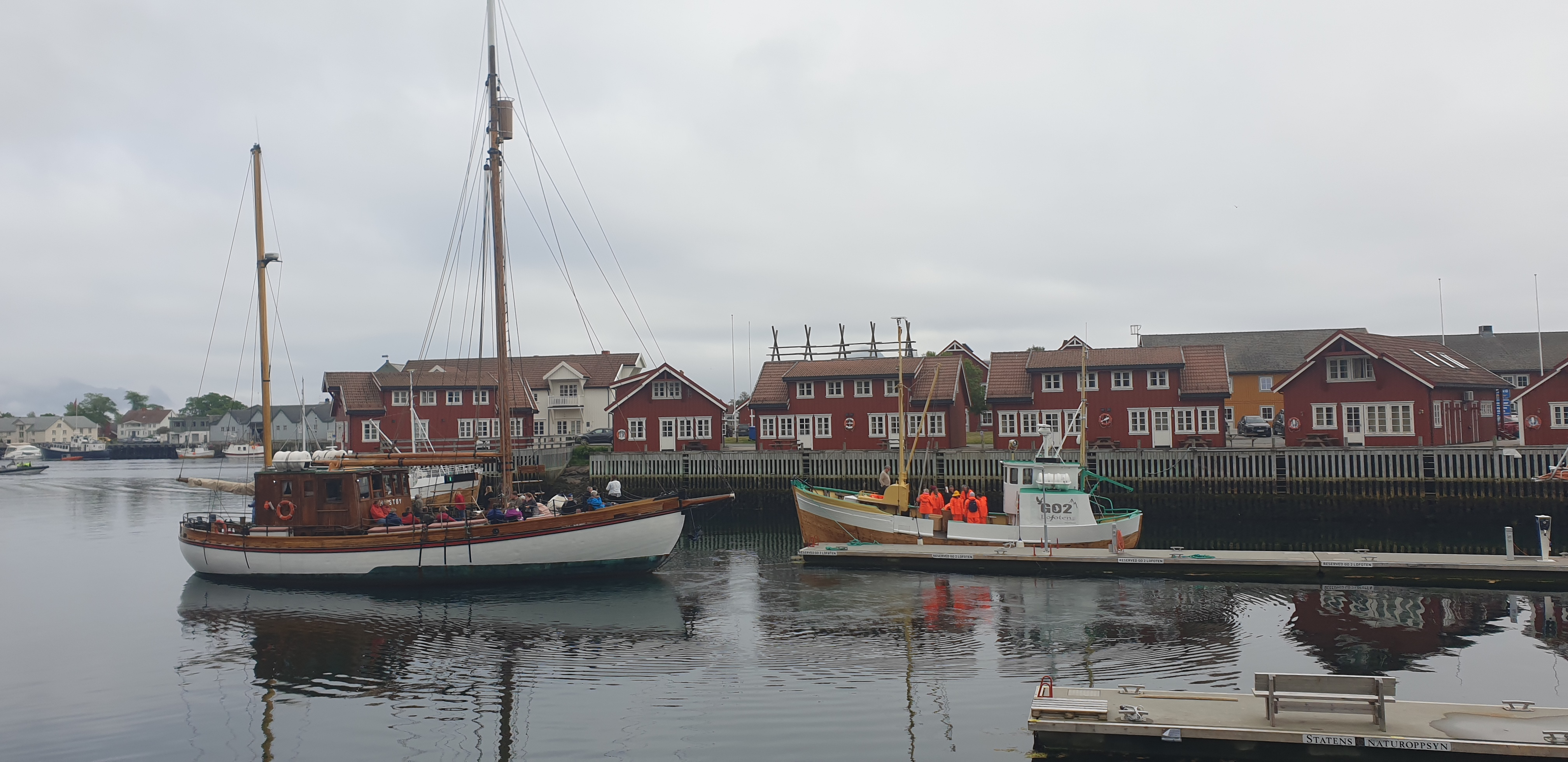
Svolvaer rorbuer

A new 10-storey high combined cultural centre and hotel with 160 rooms opened in March 2009. Many artists have been inspired by the unique light in Lofoten, and there are many artists and galleries in Svolvær such as the Lofoten artists house and the Stig Tobiassen gallery.

There is also a well known World War II museum in town called the Lofoten War Memorial Museum. Whale watching tours depart from Svolvær in late autumn and winter with a focus on Orcas (killer whales). Boat excursions to nearby Raftsundet strait and its famous branch Trollfjord is also arranged from Svolvær.

Svolvær also has a downhill skiing centre, driven solely by volunteers, Kongstind Alpinsenter. The centre has one lift, and off-piste possibilities.

The newspaper Våganavisa has been published in Svolvær since 2006.

== Geography ==
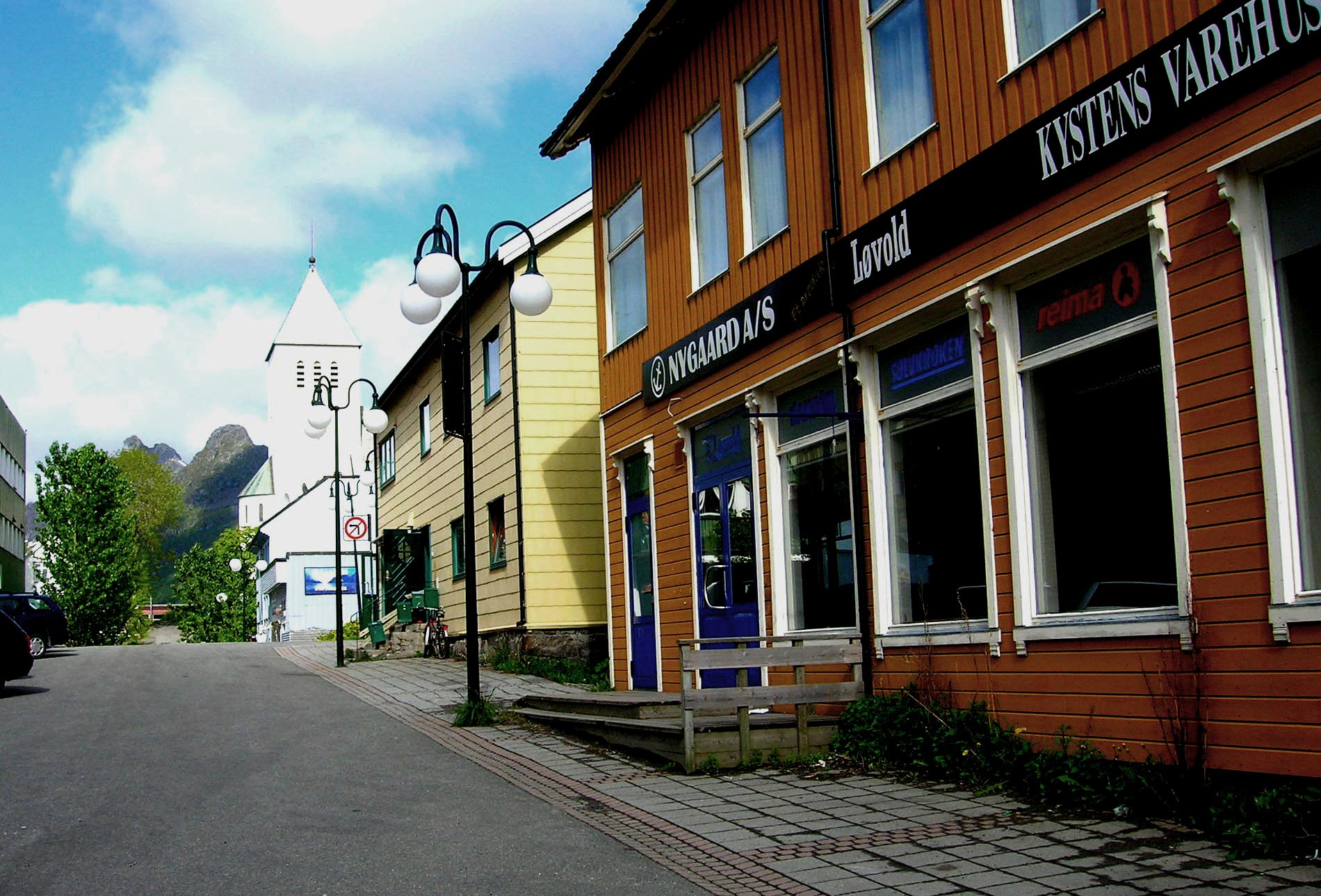
The town of Svolvær

Svolvær is located in the Lofoten archipelago on the southern coast of the island of Austvågøya, facing the open sea of the Vestfjorden to the south, and with mountains immediately to the north. The most famous mountain, Svolværgeita, had its first recorded climb in 1910.

=== Climate ===
Notably, despite the town's extremely northern location above the Arctic Circle, Svolvær experiences an oceanic climate (Cfb) or a humid continental climate (Dfb) on the border of subpolar oceanic. This temperature anomaly results in Svolvær having an average annual temperature warmer than cities such as Quebec City located more than 20 degrees farther south. Sheltered by the mountains to the north and west, the Svolvær area has less fog and experiences somewhat higher daytime temperatures in summer than the western part of Lofoten, but the same mountains also create more orographic precipitation on rainy days. Precipitation is heaviest in autumn and winter; October averages three times as much rain as does June. Svolvær has an average frost-free season of nearly 6 months. The highest recorded temperature is 29.7C on 18 July 2018 and the lowest recorded temperature is -12.3C on 30 December 2002.

Climate data for Svolvær Airport 1991–2020 (9 m, precipitation from 1961-1990)
Month	Jan	Feb	Mar	Apr	May	Jun	Jul	Aug	Sep	Oct	Nov	Dec	Year
Daily mean °C (°F)	0.3 (32.5)	−0.4 (31.3)	0.3 (32.5)	2.7 (36.9)	6.6 (43.9)	10.1 (50.2)	13.3 (55.9)	12.7 (54.9)	9.8 (49.6)	5.6 (42.1)	3.3 (37.9)	1.5 (34.7)	5.5 (41.9)
Average precipitation mm (inches)	159 (6.3)	134 (5.3)	112 (4.4)	88 (3.5)	63 (2.5)	67 (2.6)	87 (3.4)	94 (3.7)	146 (5.7)	210 (8.3)	160 (6.3)	180 (7.1)	1,500 (59.1)
Source 1: Norwegian Meteorological Institute
Source 2: yr.no

Oceanic data for Svolvær
Month	Jan	Feb	Mar	Apr	May	Jun	Jul	Aug	Sep	Oct	Nov	Dec	Year
Average sea temperature °C	5.0	4.5	3.9	4.5	6.5	9.8	12.0	12.5	10.8	8.8	7.9	6.5	7.8
Source 1: Weather Atlas

== Transportation ==
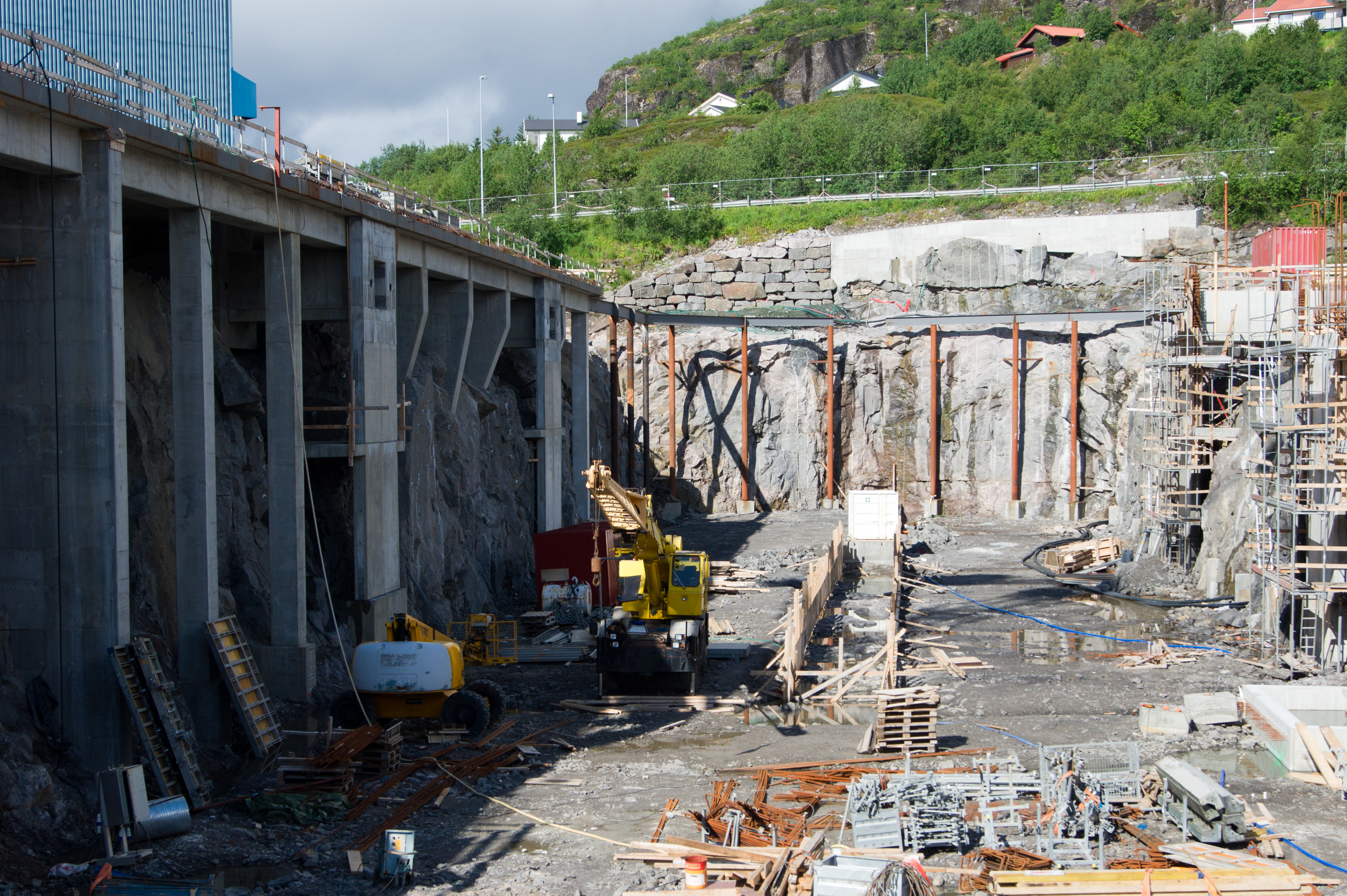
Dry dock being built in Svolvær (2010)

Most of Svolvær is located on the main island of Austvågøya, but some parts of the town are built on small surrounding islands connected by bridges, including the Svinøy Bridge. Tesla built a Supercharger in the town in 2020. There is a regional airport near the town, Svolvær Airport, Helle, and Svolvær is a port of call for Hurtigruten. There is a ferry connection from Svolvær to the nearby scenic island of Skrova, which also crosses the Vestfjorden to Skutvik (in Hamarøy Municipality) in the summer. There is also an express boat that connects to the city of Bodø. The Lofast road (European route E10) was officially opened on 1 December 2007, giving Svolvær access to the mainland and Harstad/Narvik Airport, Evenes. There are plans to upgrade European route E10 from Å to Harstad/Narvik Airport, Evenes. There are now scheduled bus connections to Evenes (3 hr) and Narvik (4 hr 15 min).

Svolvær, Norway September, 2026

== Museums ==
Museums include the Lofoten War Memorial Museum.

== Twin towns ==
- Ancona, Italy
