= Gimsøy Municipality =

Former municipality in Nordland, Norway

Gimsøy Municipality Gimsøy herred
- Former municipality
- Gimsø herred (historic name)
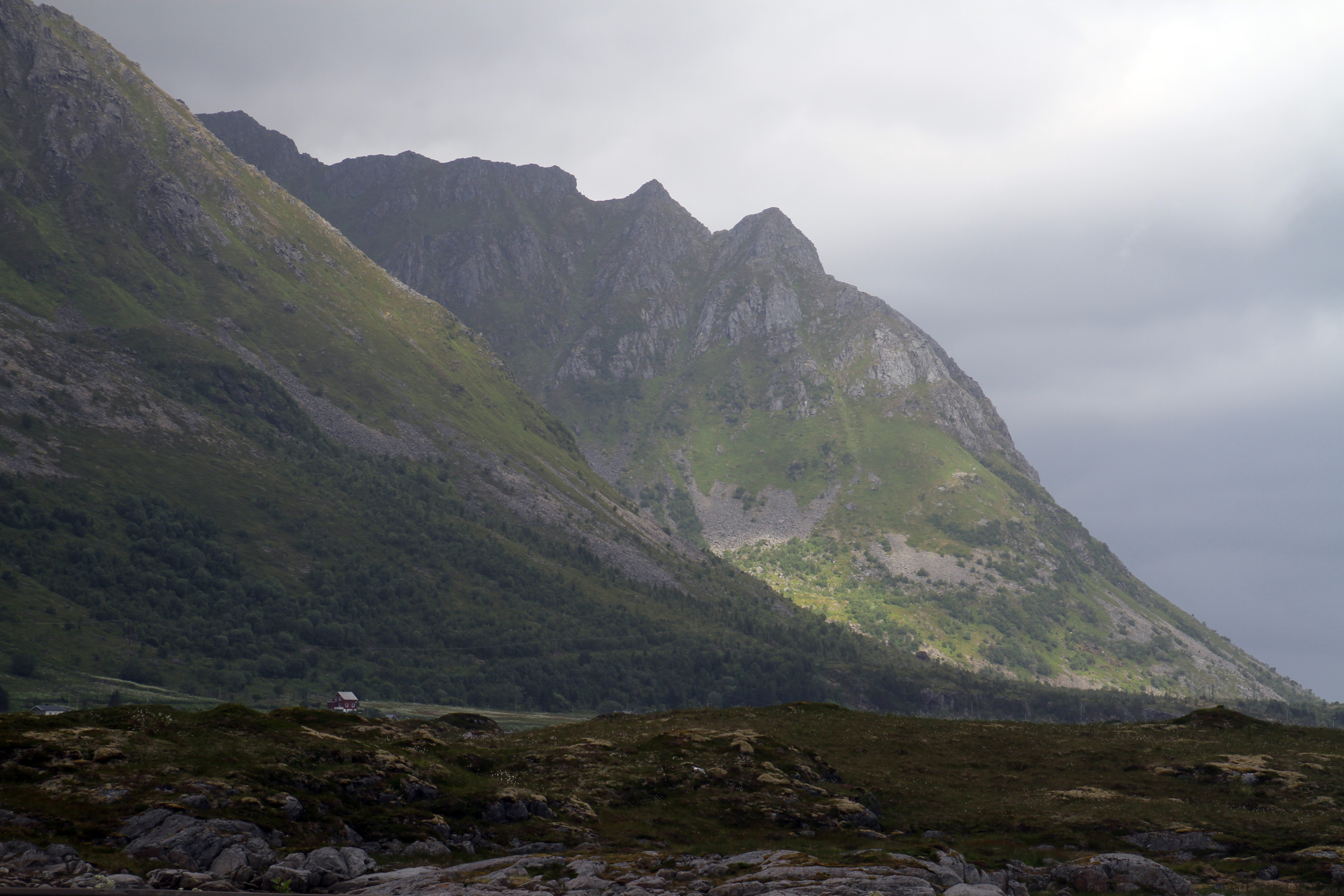
- View of the mountains in Gimsøy

- Nordland within Norway

- Gimsøy within Nordland
- Coordinates: 68.3207°N 14.2413°E
- Country: Norway
- County: Nordland
- District: Lofoten
- Established: 1856
  - Preceded by: Vaagan Municipality
- Disestablished: 1 Jan 1964
  - Succeeded by: Vågan Municipality
- Administrative centre: Gimsøysand

Government
  - Mayor (1956–1963): Konrad Høydahl ((V))

Area (upon dissolution)
  - Total: 186.5 km^{2} (72.0 sq mi)
  - Rank: #386 in Norway
- Highest elevation: 818 m (2,684 ft)

Population (1963)
  - Total: 1,600
  - Rank: #521 in Norway
  - Density: 8.6/km^{2} (22/sq mi)
  - Change (10 years): ▼ −10%
- Demonym: Gimsøy-folk

Official language
  - Norwegian form: Bokmål
- Time zone: UTC+01:00 (CET)
  - Summer (DST): UTC+02:00 (CEST)
- ISO 3166 code: NO-1864

Gimsøy is a former municipality in Nordland county, Norway. The 186.5-square-kilometre (72.0 sq mi) municipality existed from 1856 until its dissolution in 1964. It was located in the northwestern part of what is now Vågan Municipality. The municipality consisted of the island of Gimsøya and the northwestern part of the larger neighboring island of Austvågøya. The municipality also included 407 other small islands as well as hundreds of little islets and skerries, all of which are located in the Lofoten archipelago. The administrative centre was located at the village of Gimsøysand, where the Gimsøy Church is located.

Prior to its dissolution in 1964, the 186.5-square-kilometre (72.0 sq mi) municipality was the 386th largest by area out of the 689 municipalities in Norway. Gimsøy Municipality was the 521st most populous municipality in Norway with a population of about 1,600. The municipality's population density was 8.6 inhabitants per square kilometre (22/sq mi) and its population had decreased by 10% over the previous 10-year period.

== General information ==
The municipality of Gimsøy was established in 1856 when it was split off from the large Vågan Municipality. Initially, Gimsøy had a population of 987. During the 1960s, there were many municipal mergers across Norway due to the work of the Schei Committee. On 1 January 1964, Gimsøy Municipality (population: 1,551) was merged with the neighboring town of Svolvær (population: 3,952) and Vågan Municipality (population: 4,820) to form the new, larger Vågan Municipality.

=== Name ===
The municipality (originally the parish) is named after the island of Gimsøya (Old Norse: Gimista) since the first Gimsøy Church was built there. The first element is the dative case of the word gimisto which is a contraction of the Old Norse words gimist which means "sheep" and vista which means "place of residence". The island was historical used for sheep farming. Historically, the name of the municipality was spelled Gimsø. On 6 January 1908, a royal resolution changed the spelling of the name of the municipality to Gimsøy.

=== Churches ===
The Church of Norway had one parish (sokn) within Gimsøy Municipality. At the time of the municipal dissolution, it was part of the Gimsøy prestegjeld and the Lofoten prosti (deanery) in the Diocese of Sør-Hålogaland.

Churches in Gimsøy Municipality
| Parish (sokn) | Church name | Location of the church | Year built |
|---|---|---|---|
| Gimsøy | Gimsøy Church | Gimsøysand | 1876 |

== Geography ==
The municipality encompassed the whole island of Gimsøya and the northwestern part of the island of Austvågøya plus many smaller islets and skerries surrounding the two large islands. The highest point in the municipality is the 818-metre (2,684 ft) tall mountain Breitinden on the island of Austvågøya. Valberg Municipality and Borge Municipality were located to the west (on the island of Vestvågøya), Vågan Municipality was to the south (on the island of Austvågøya), and Hadsel Municipality (also on Austvågøya).

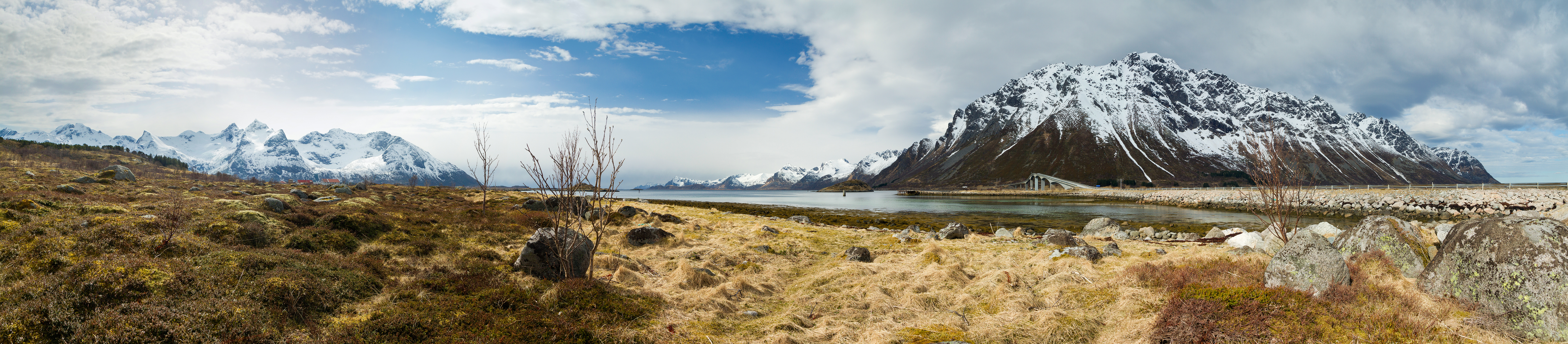
View at Gimsøystraumen (scroll left to right for more)

== Government ==
While it existed, Gimsøy Municipality was responsible for primary education (through 10th grade), outpatient health services, senior citizen services, welfare and other social services, zoning, economic development, and municipal roads and utilities. The municipality was governed by a municipal council of directly elected representatives. The mayor was indirectly elected by a vote of the municipal council. The municipality was under the jurisdiction of the Hålogaland Court of Appeal.

=== Municipal council ===
The municipal council (Herredsstyre) of Gimsøy Municipality was made up of 15 representatives that were elected to four-year terms. The tables below show the historical composition of the council by political party.

Gimsøy herredsstyre 1959–1963
| Party name (in Norwegian) | Number of representatives |
|---|---|
| Local List(s) (Lokale lister) | 15 |
| Total number of members: | 15 |
Note: On 1 January 1964, Gimsøy Municipality became part of Vågan Municipality.

Gimsøy herredsstyre 1955–1959
| Party name (in Norwegian) | Number of representatives |
|---|---|
| Local List(s) (Lokale lister) | 15 |
| Total number of members: | 15 |

Gimsøy herredsstyre 1951–1955
| Party name (in Norwegian) | Number of representatives |
|---|---|
| Local List(s) (Lokale lister) | 12 |
| Total number of members: | 12 |

Gimsøy herredsstyre 1947–1951
| Party name (in Norwegian) | Number of representatives |
|---|---|
| Labour Party (Arbeiderpartiet) | 2 |
| Joint List(s) of Non-Socialist Parties (Borgerlige Felleslister) | 4 |
| Local List(s) (Lokale lister) | 6 |
| Total number of members: | 12 |

Gimsøy herredsstyre 1945–1947
| Party name (in Norwegian) | Number of representatives |
|---|---|
| Labour Party (Arbeiderpartiet) | 2 |
| Local List(s) (Lokale lister) | 10 |
| Total number of members: | 12 |

Gimsøy herredsstyre 1937–1941*
| Party name (in Norwegian) | Number of representatives |
|---|---|
| Labour Party (Arbeiderpartiet) | 8 |
| Local List(s) (Lokale lister) | 4 |
| Total number of members: | 12 |
Note: Due to the German occupation of Norway during World War II, no elections were held for new municipal councils until after the war ended in 1945.

=== Mayors ===
The mayor (Norwegian: ordfører) of Gimsøy Municipality was the political leader of the municipality and the chairperson of the municipal council. Here is a list of people who have held this position:

- 1856–1869: Unknown
- 1870–1876: Eilert Benjaminsen
- 1877–1878: J. Fosli
- 1879–1886: Eilert Benjaminsen
- 1887–1892: Sevard Johnsen
- 1893–1898: Christian Eilertsen
- 1899–1904: L. Dyrkorn
- 1905–1910: Nils Winther
- 1911–1922: Johan O. Gjendahl
- 1923–1931: Edvard Tellemann (V)
- 1932–1933: Sverre Thurn
- 1933–1937: Håkon Benjaminsen
- 1938–1942: Torgeir Walle (Ap)
- 1942–1944: Konrad Hov (NS)
- 1945–1955: Harald Dreyer
- 1956–1963: Konrad Høydahl (V)

== See also ==
- List of former municipalities of Norway
