= Gunnar Berg (painter) =

Norwegian painter (1863–1893)

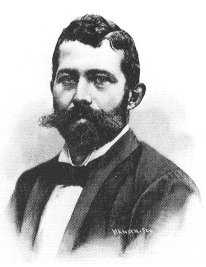
Self portrait

Gunnar Berg (21 May 1863 – 23 December 1893) was a Norwegian painter, known for his paintings of his native Lofoten. He principally painted memorable scenes of the everyday life of the local fishermen.

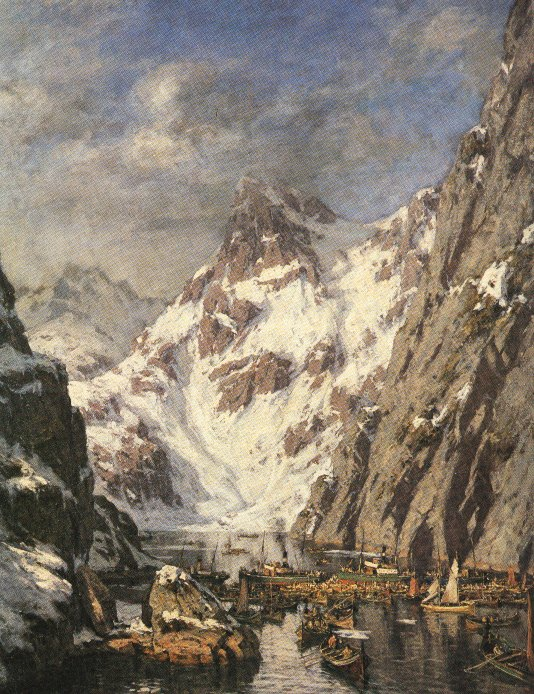
Trollfjordslaget (1890)

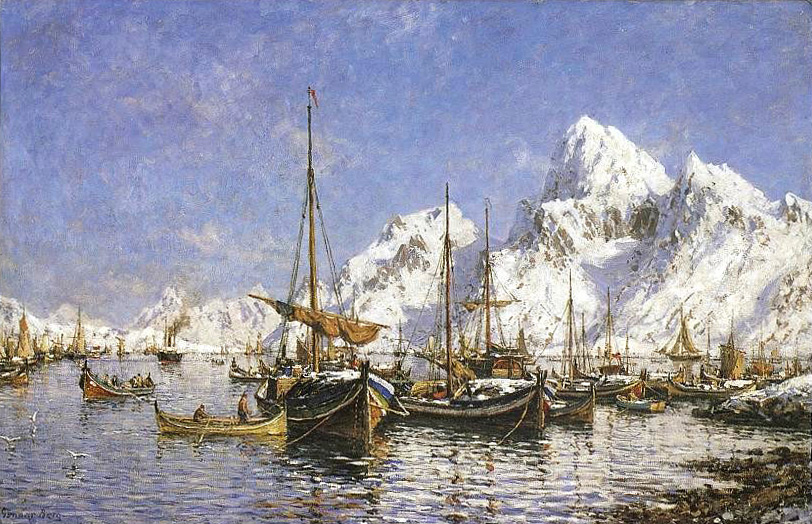
Fra Vaterfjord (1886)

== Background ==
Gunnar Berg was born on Svinøya in Svolvær on Lofoten, Nordland County, Norway. He was the oldest of 12 siblings born to a wealthy landowner and merchant, Lars Thodal Walnum Berg (1830-–1903) and Lovise Johnsen (1842–1921). From 1875 until 1881, he attended Trondheim Cathedral School, and also took private lessons in drawing and painting by the artist H.J. Nicolaysen. He later attended a trade school in Bergen. He was first employed as a merchant. He later studied to become an artist.

== Biography ==
Gunnar Berg first studied at the art academy in Düsseldorf, Germany. From 1883 until his death, Gunnar Berg studied and worked in Düsseldorf and Berlin, associated with the Düsseldorf school of painting. During the Lofoten fishing season, Berg was at home in Svolvær. With the help of his parents, built a studio on Svinøya. When he was at Lofoten, he had a good collaboration with fellow painter Otto Sinding.

Berg painted scenes from his hometown including both landscapes and seascapes. Fishermen, mountains and the sea, during both summer and winter, comprised the primary themes of his artistry.

Among his most significant paintings are Fra Vaterfjord (1886) which is now on display at Svolvær City Hall and Trollfjordslaget (1890) which is situated in the Gunnar Berg Gallery in Svolvær. Fra Vaterfjord is dated to between 1886 and 1893. The painting features Nordland boats during a break in fishing. In the background is a steamship that is probably buying up fish for transport south.

Trollfjordslaget depicts The Battle of Trollfjord which was fought in 1890. The Battle at Trollfjord (Slaget i Trollfjorden) was fought between the owners of large steamships and some Lofotfisherman over the control of local fishing.

Trollfjordslaget was Gunnar Berg's last major work. In 1891 it was discovered that he had cancer in one leg that had to be amputated. His health was weakening and during the fall of 1893 he incurred pneumonia.

Gunnar Berg died in Berlin in 1893. His grave is in the family's chapel on the Island of Gunnarholmen in Svolvaer. A bust of him was erected there in 1994.

== Gallery ==
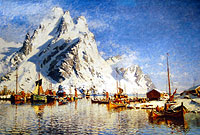
Svolvær

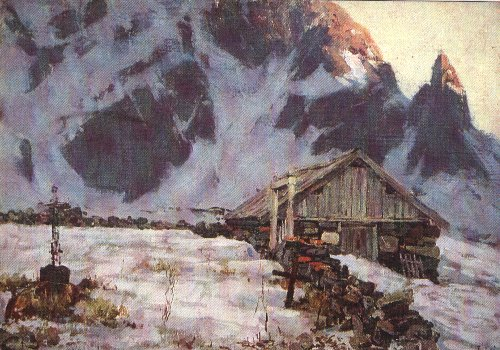
Reine kirkegård

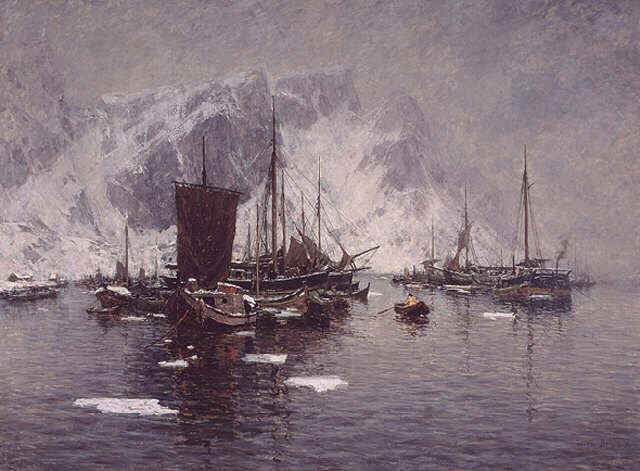
Fiskebåter ved Reine

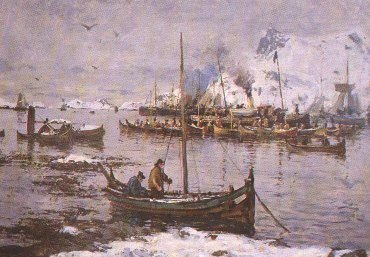
Fra Svolvær i Lofoten
