= Raftsund Bridge =

Raftsund Bridge Raftsundbrua
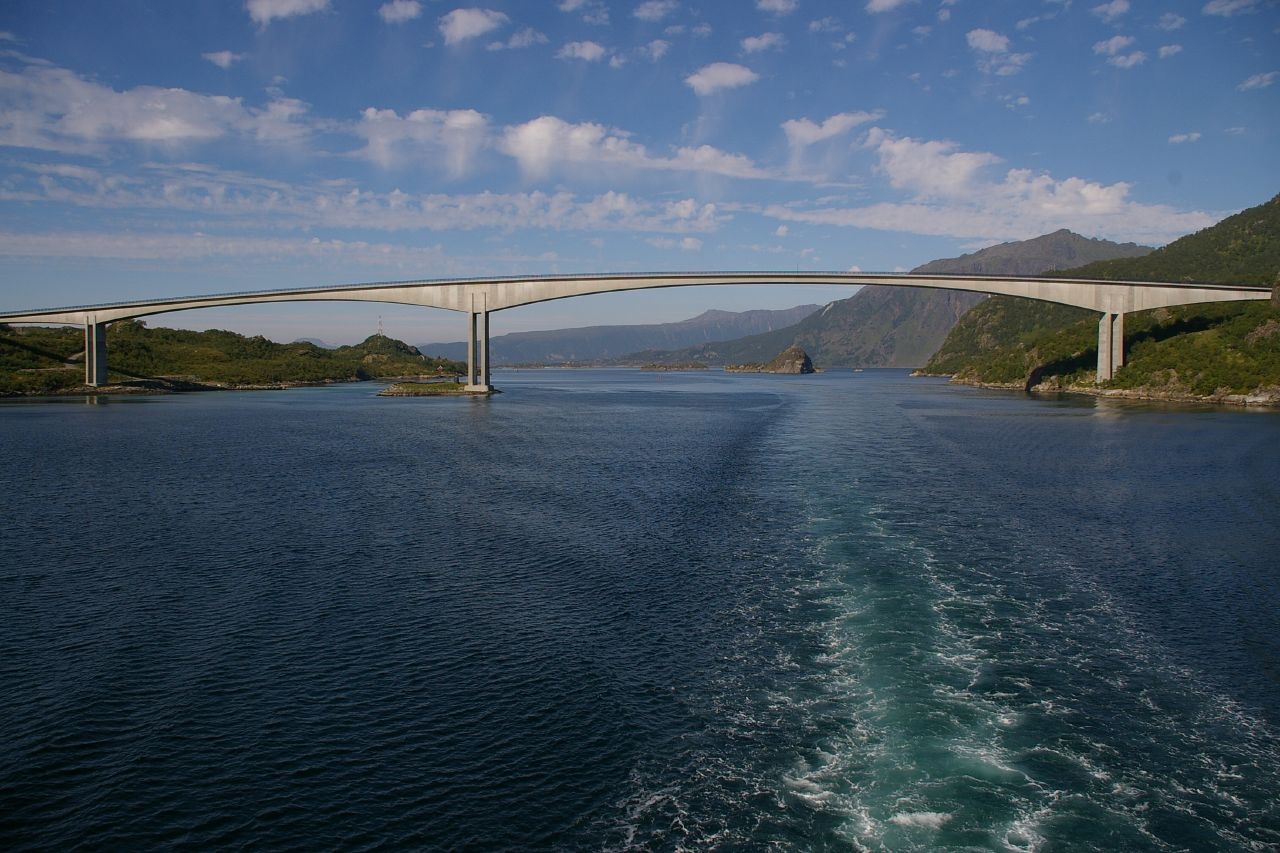
- View of the bridge
- Coordinates: 68°27′26″N 15°11′33″E
- Carries: E10
- Crosses: Raftsundet

Characteristics
- Design: Cantilever
- Total length: 711 metres (2,333 ft)
- Longest span: 298 metres (978 ft)
- No. of spans: 4
- Clearance below: 45 metres (148 ft)

History
- Opened: 1998

The Raftsund Bridge (Norwegian: Raftsundbrua) is a two-lane cantilever road bridge in Hadsel Municipality in Nordland county, Norway. The bridge carries the European route E10 highway and it crosses the Raftsundet strait between the islands of Austvågøya and Hinnøya. The bridge is 711 metres (2,333 ft) long, the main span is 298 metres (978 ft), and the maximum clearance to the sea beneath the bridge is 45 metres (148 ft). The bridge has 4 spans.

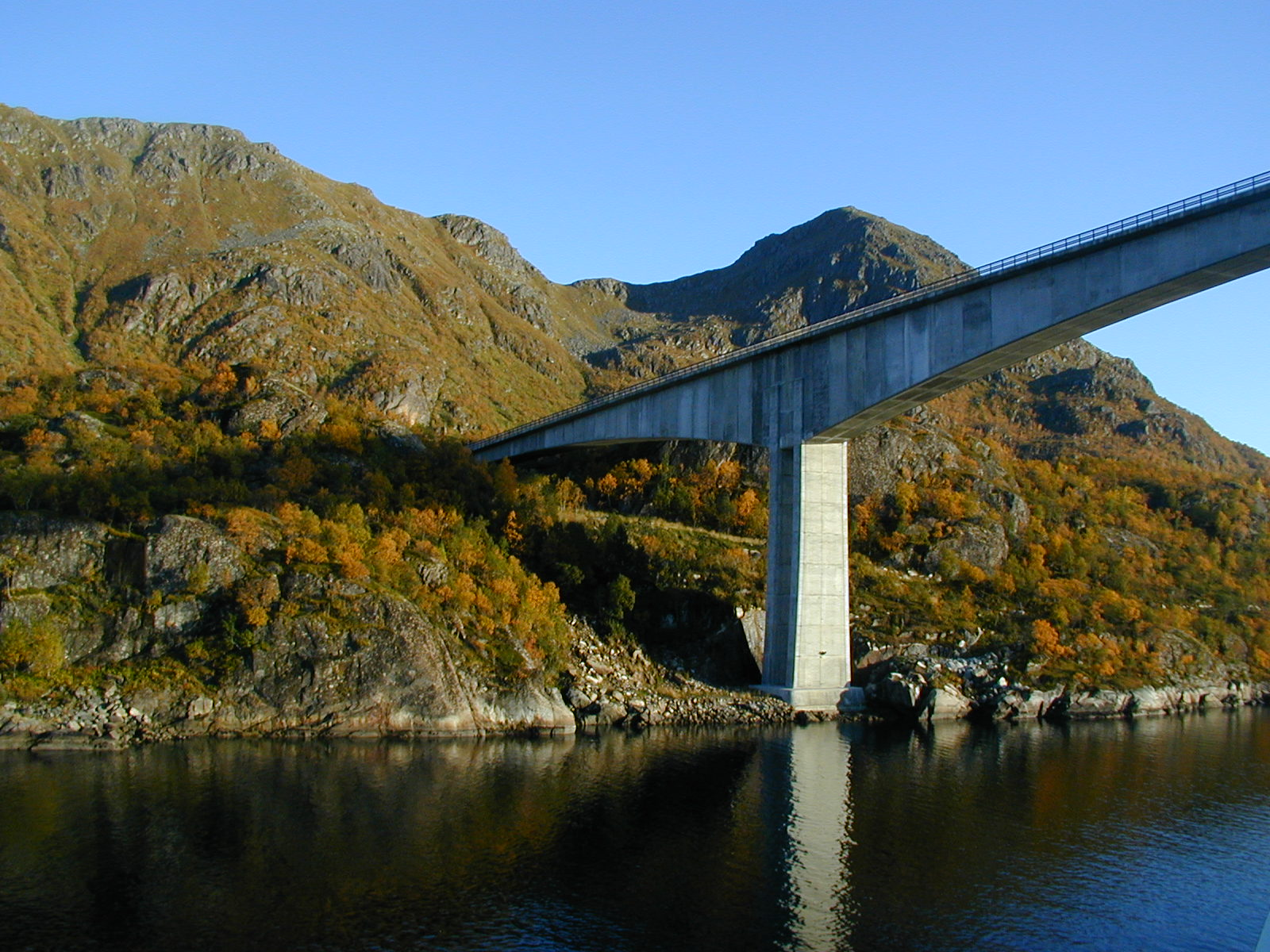
The Raftsund Bridge at Hinnøya

The Raftsund Bridge was opened on 6 November 1998, at a cost of 125 million kr. It was the last of the long bridges connecting the Vesterålen islands. It is part of the Lofast project, the road connecting the Lofoten islands to the mainland, which was completed in December 2007.

== See also ==
- List of bridges
- List of bridges by length
- List of bridges in Norway
- List of bridges in Norway by length
