= Raftsundet =

Strait in Nordland, Norway

Raftsundet (Norwegian); Ráktanuorri (Northern Sami)
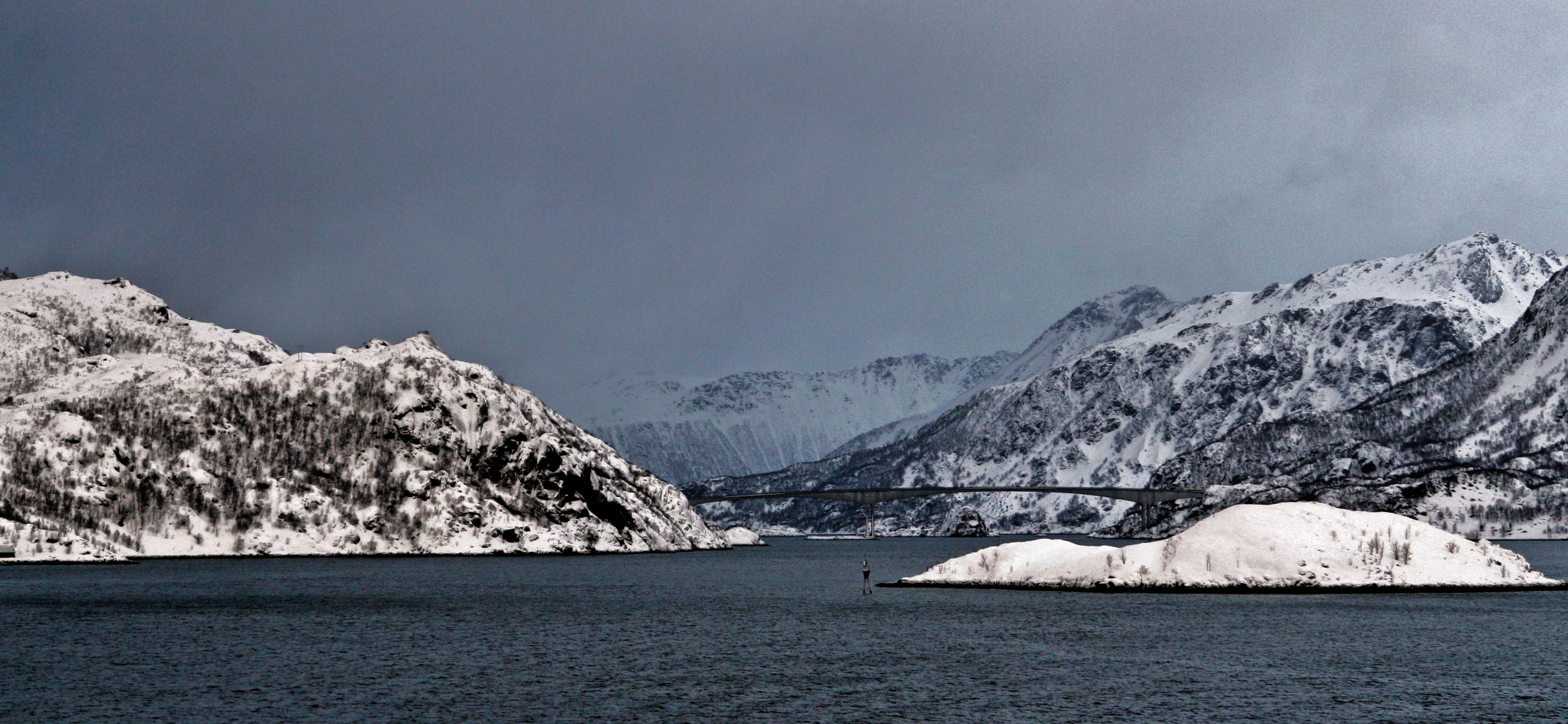
- View of the Raftsundet which is crossed by the Raftsund Bridge
- Interactive map of the strait
- Location: Nordland county, Norway
- Coordinates: 68.40229°N 15.10636°E
- Type: Strait
- Primary inflows: Hadselfjorden
- Primary outflows: Vestfjorden
- Basin countries: Norway
- Max. length: 25 kilometres (16 mi)

Raftsundet (Norwegian) or Ráktanuorri (Northern Sami) is a strait in Nordland county, Norway. The 25-kilometre (16 mi) long strait runs between the islands of Hinnøya and Austvågøya, mostly in Hadsel Municipality, but the southern end is in Vågan Municipality. The strait is crossed by the Raftsund Bridge near the northern mouth of the strait. The Trollfjorden is a small fjord that branches off the strait to the west and it is a well-known tourist attraction. The island of Stormolla lies at the southern mouth where the strait joins the Vestfjorden.

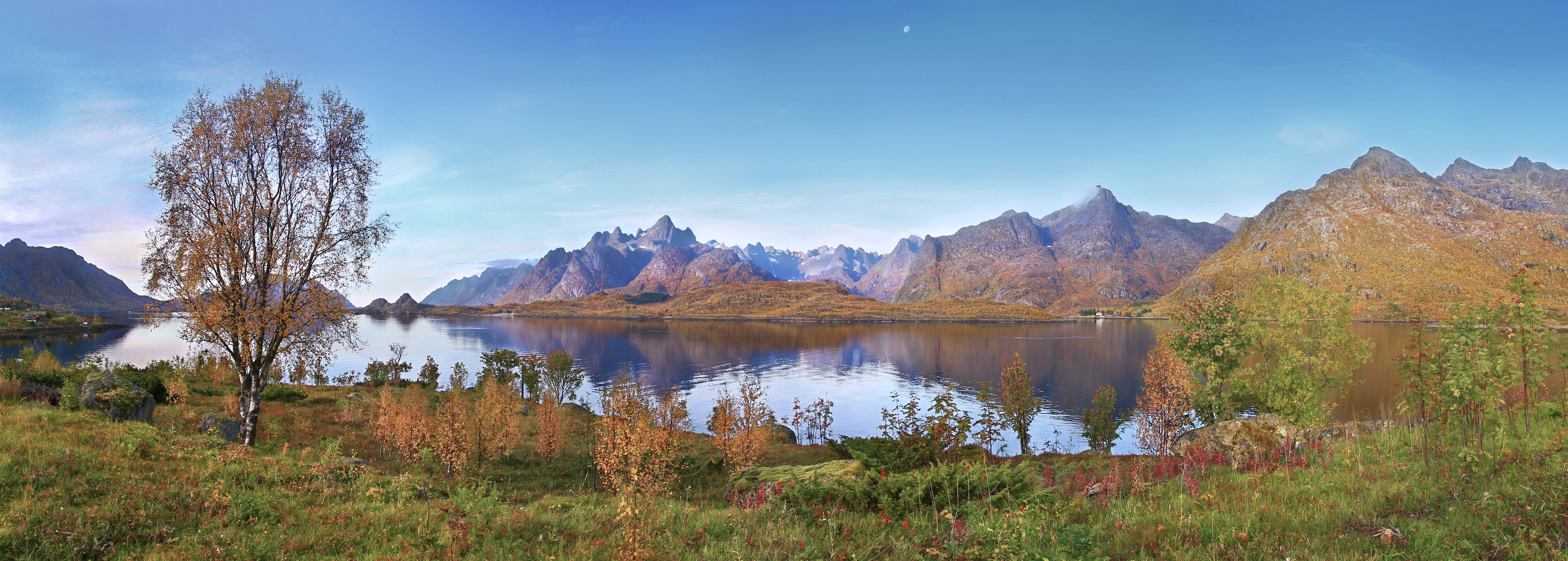
Raftsundet seen from Hinnøya in late September
