= Lofotkraft =

Norwegian power company

Lofotkraft Holding AS
- Type: Municipal owned
- Industry: electric power distribution
- Founded: 5 December 2003
- Headquarters: Svolvær, Norway
- Area served: Lofoten
- Key people: Arnt Marelius Winther (CEO); Søren Fredrik Voie (Chairman)
- Revenue: NOK 160 million (2006)
- Operating income: NOK 58 million (2006)
- Net income: NOK 43 million (2006)
- Owner: Six municipalities
- Number of employees: 15 (2026)
- Website: www.lofotkraft.no

Lofotkraft is a power company that operates the power grid in Lofoten, Norway as well as ten hydroelectric power plants through the subsidiary Lofotkraft Produksjon. Since 1998 retailing of power has been managed by Kraftinor, a joint venture with Narvik Energi. It also owns half of Lofotkraft Vind, along with Narvik Energi.

The company is owned by the six municipalities it operates the power grid in, Vestvågøy Municipality (41%), Vågan Municipality (41%), Flakstad Municipality (6.5%), Moskenes Municipality (6.5%), Værøy Municipality (3%) and Røst Municipality (2%).
