= Sundklakkstraumen Bridge =

Sundklakkstraumen Bridge Sundklakkstraumen bru
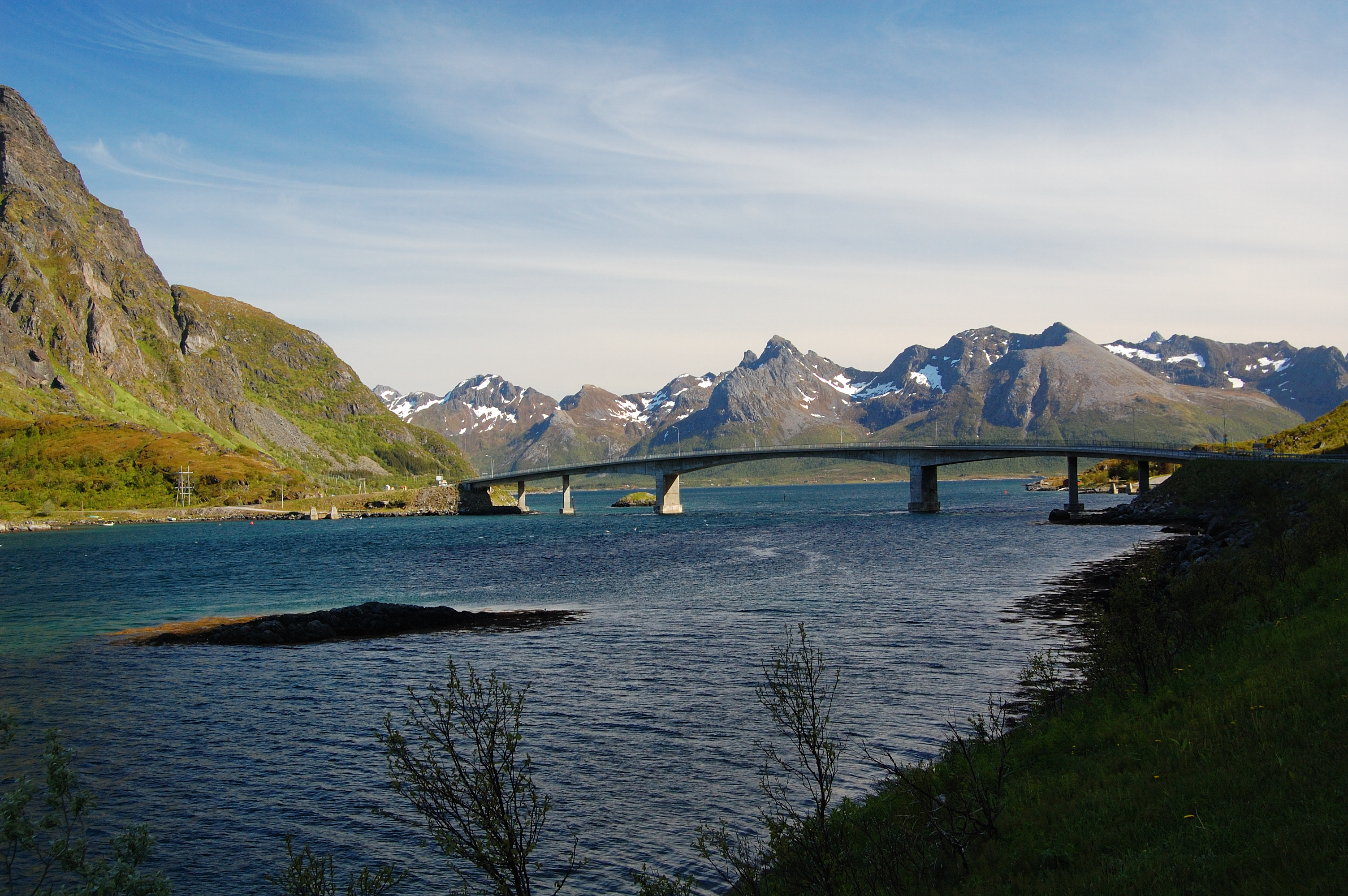
- View of the bridge
- Coordinates: 68°16′5″N 14°9′20″E
- Carries: E10
- Crosses: Sundklakkstraumen
- Locale: Vestvågøy and Vågan, Norway

Characteristics
- Total length: 271 metres (889 ft)
- Longest span: 90 metres (300 ft)

History
- Opened: 1976

The Sundklakkstraumen Bridge (Norwegian: Sundklakkstraumen bru) is a cantilever road bridge that crosses the Sundklakkstraumen strait between the islands of Gimsøya (in Vågan Municipality) and Vestvågøya (in Vestvågøy Municipality) in Nordland county, Norway. The bridge is 271 metres (889 ft) long and the main span is 90 metres (300 ft) long. The Sundklakkstraumen Bridge was opened in 1976 and it is one of many bridges that connect the islands of the Lofoten archipelago via the European route E10 highway.

== See also ==
- List of bridges in Norway
- List of bridges in Norway by length
- List of bridges
- List of bridges by length
