= Gimsøysand =

Village in Vågan Municipality, Norway

Gimsøysand Gimsøy
- Village
- Interactive map of Gimsøysand
- Location within Nordland Location within Norway
- Coordinates: 68°19′14″N 14°14′28″E
- Country: Norway
- Region: Northern Norway
- County: Nordland
- District: Lofoten
- Municipality: Vågan Municipality
- Elevation: 0.5 m (1.6 ft)
- Time zone: UTC+01:00 (CET)
  - Summer (DST): UTC+02:00 (CEST)
- Post Code: 8314 Gimsøysand

Gimsøysand or Gimsøy is a village in Vågan Municipality in Nordland county, Norway. The village is located on the northeastern shore of the island of Gimsøya, southeast of the villages of Saupstad and Vinje.

Gimsøy Church is located in the village. The church is built of wood. It was consecrated on 18 October 1876 and has 300 seats. The church was repaired after storms in 1887 and 1906, and also repaired in 1954–55.

The village was the administrative centre of the old Gimsøy Municipality which existed from 1856 until 1964.
