= Gimsøya =

Island in Nordland, Norway

Gimsøya Gimsøy
- Interactive map of Gimsøya; Gimsøy

Geography
- Location: Nordland, Norway
- Coordinates: 68.2918°N 14.1865°E
- Archipelago: Lofoten
- Area: 46.4 km^{2} (17.9 sq mi)
- Length: 11 km (6.8 mi)
- Width: 5 km (3.1 mi)
- Highest elevation: 767 m (2516 ft)
- Highest point: Bardstrandfjellet

Administration
- Norway
- County: Nordland
- Municipality: Vågan Municipality

Demographics
- Population: 181 (2016)
- Pop. density: 3.9/km^{2} (10.1/sq mi)

Gimsøya is an island in Vågan Municipality in Nordland county, Norway. Gimsøya is situated between the islands of Austvågøya and Vestvågøya in the Lofoten archipelago. The 46.4-square-kilometre (17.9 sq mi) island has a population (2016) of 181.

The European route E10 highway passes through Gimsøya linking the island to Austvågøya by the Gimsøystraumen Bridge and to the island of Vestvågøya by the Sundklakkstraumen Bridge. The main population centres on Gimsøya include Vinje (where Gimsøy Elementary school is located), Hov (where the golf course is located), Hovsund (where the marina and the abandoned fish factory is located), Barstrand (where some fishing industry is located), Gimsøysand (where Gimsøy Church is located), and Årrstranda.

Historically, the island made up a large part of the old Gimsøy Municipality which existed from 1856 until its dissolution in 1964.

== Geography ==
The southern and eastern part of Gimsøya is mountainous. The highest point is the 767-metre (2,516 ft) tall Svarttinden (next to Bardstrandfjellet). In the north and west, the island is flat and marshy, with the exception of the 368-metre (1,207 ft) tall Hoven mountain. There are large protected areas in Gimsøya related to fauna and bird life. "Gimsøy marshes nature reserve" (Gimsøymyrene naturreservat) is located on the island.

=== Beaches ===
The north-facing part of Gimsøy has great views of the open ocean, and is a popular place to watch the midnight sun. Both Hovstranda (Hov beach) by the camping site, Vinjestranda (Vinje beach) by Gimsøy landhandel (grocery store) and the smaller beaches are good places to see the midnight sun.

== Media gallery ==
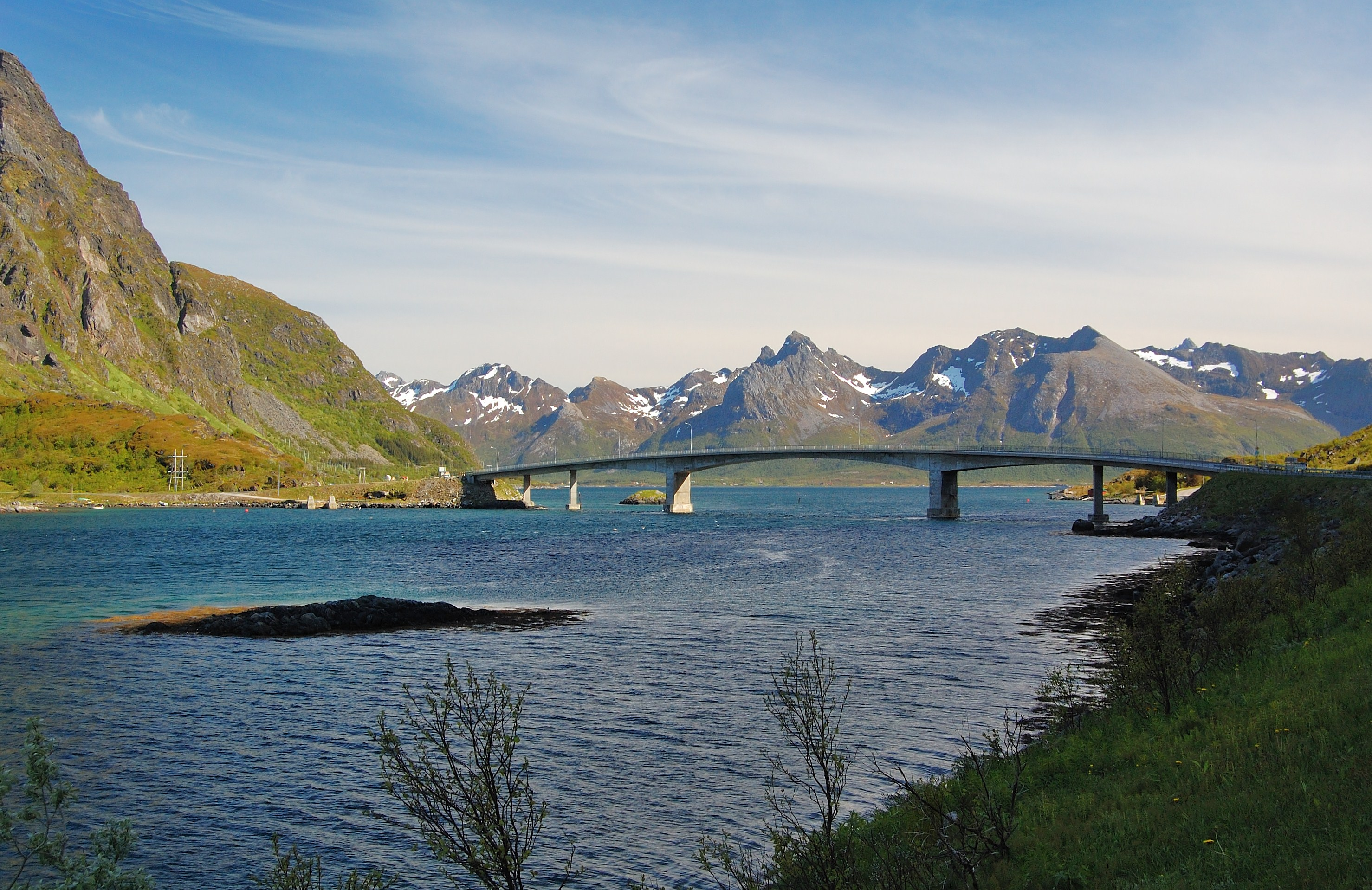
Sundklakkstraumen Bridge

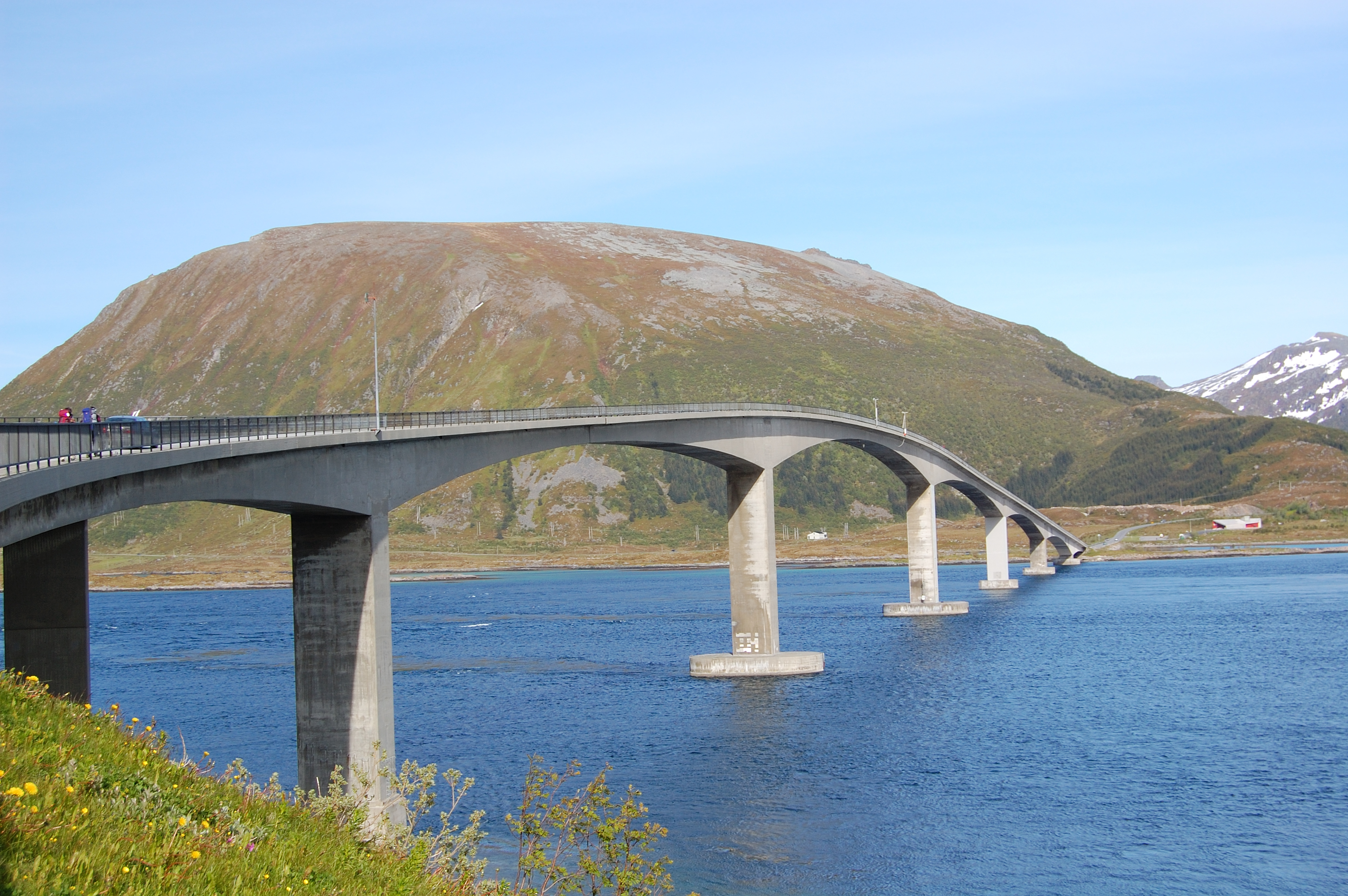
Gimsøystraumen Bridge

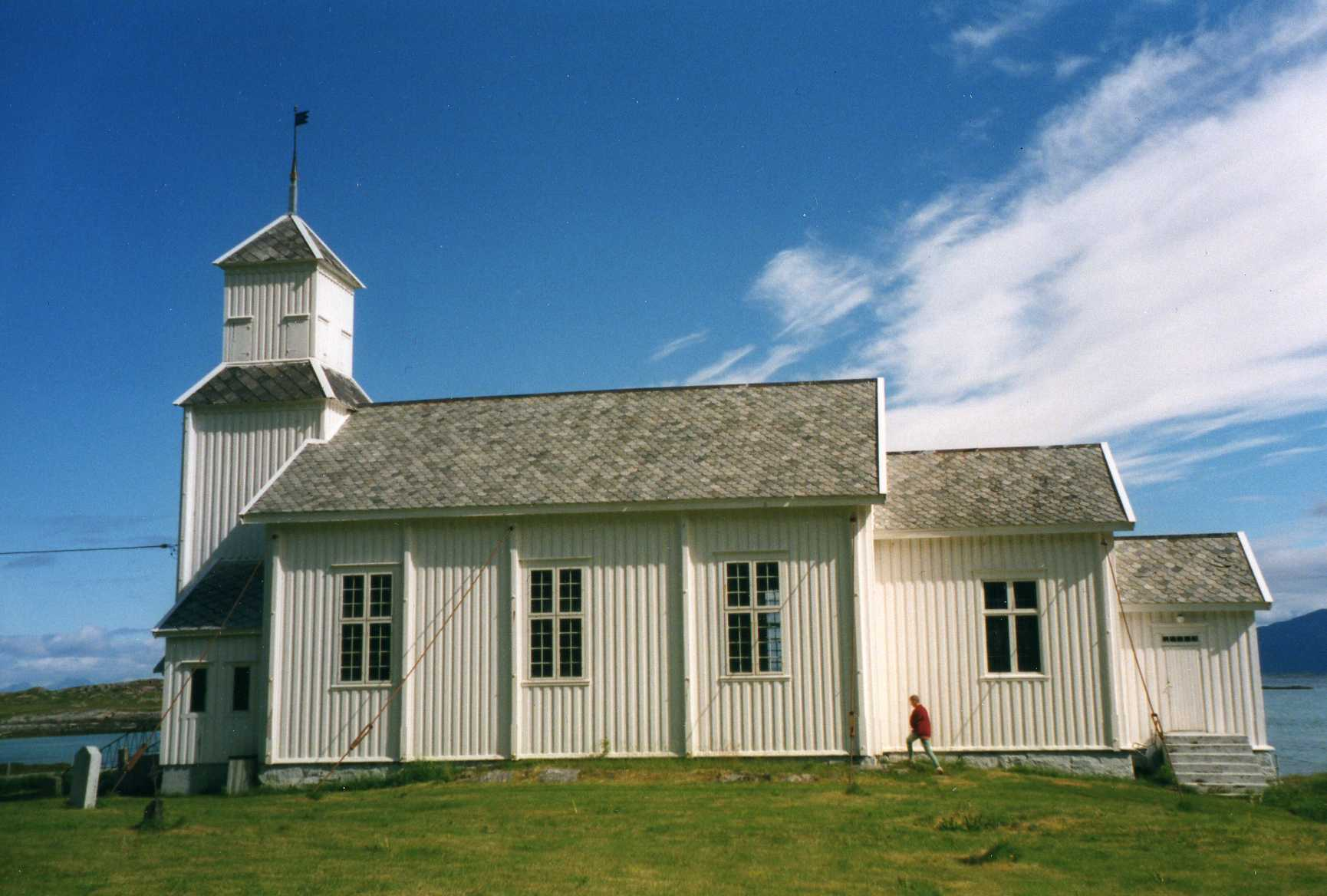
Gimsøy Church at Gimsøysand

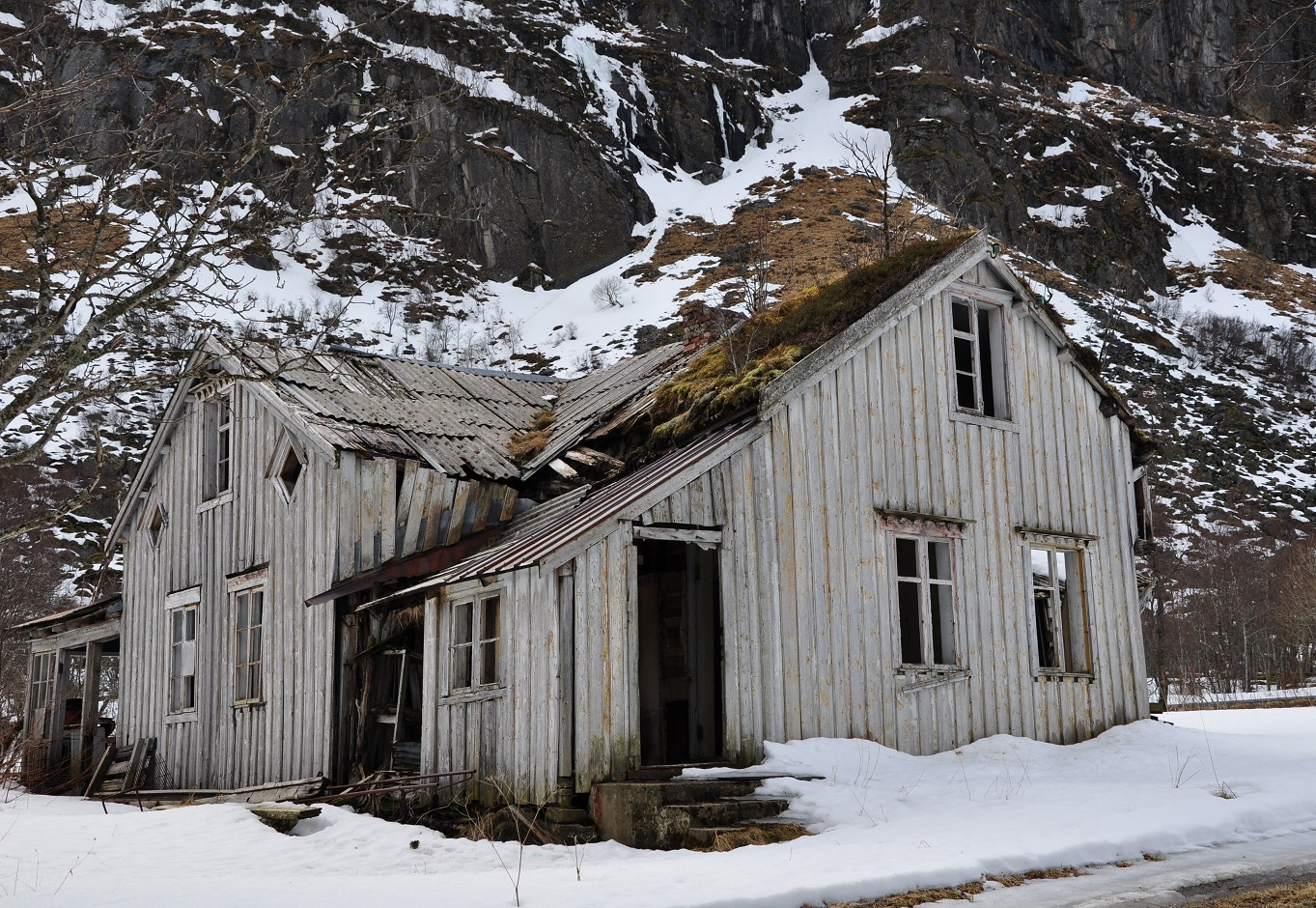
Abandoned house in Gimsøysand

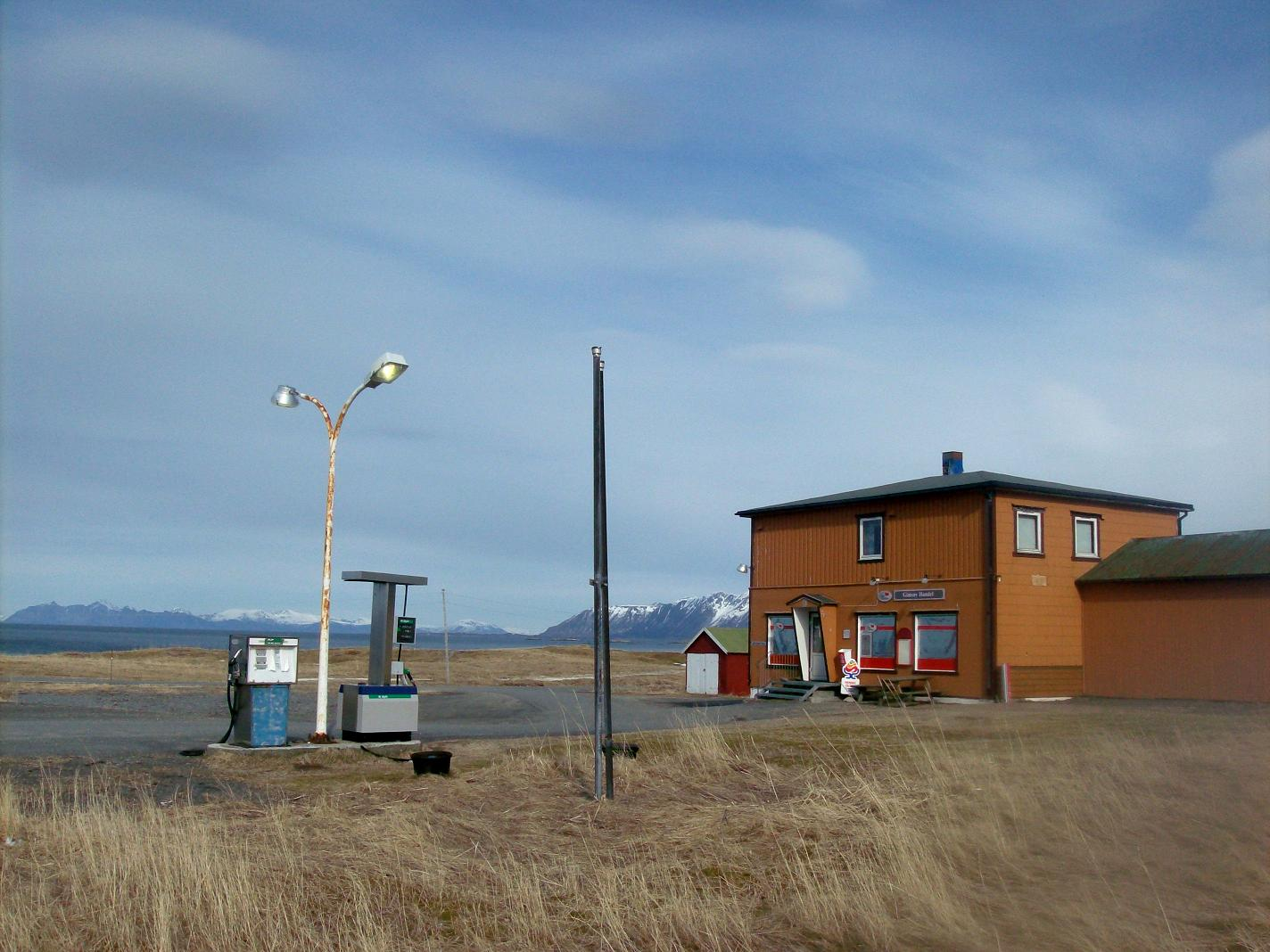
Shop and gas station on Gimsøya
