= Trollfjord =

Fjord in Nordland, Norway

- Trollfjorden
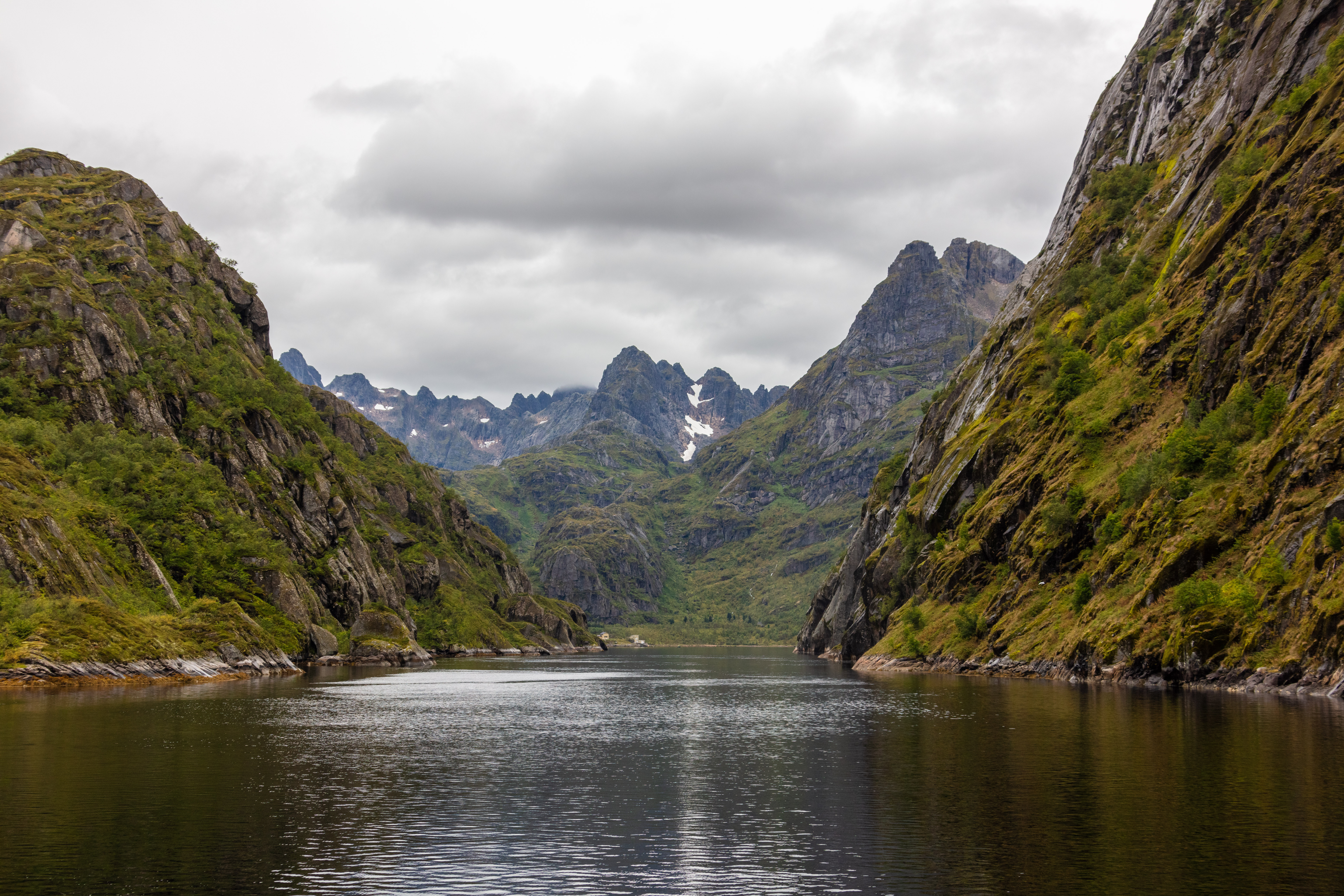
- View of the fjord
- Interactive map of the fjord
- Location: Nordland county, Norway
- Coordinates: 68.3628°N 14.9361°E
- Type: Fjord
- Basin countries: Norway
- Max. length: 2 kilometres (1.2 mi)
- Max. width: 600 to 1,100 m (2,000 to 3,600 ft)
- Max. depth: 72 metres (236 ft)

The Trollfjord or Trollfjorden is a fjord in Hadsel Municipality in Nordland county, Norway. The 2-kilometre (1.2 mi) long fjord cuts into the island of Austvågøya and flows out into the Raftsundet strait. The fjord has a narrow entrance and steep-sided mountains surrounding it. The name is derived from troll, a figure from Norse mythology.

The fjord is a popular tourist attraction due to the beauty of its natural setting. It is only accessible by boat or by a nearby 10 kilometres (6.2 mi) hike over very rugged terrain. The Hurtigruten's ships on the route between Bergen and Kirkenes detour into Trollfjorden. It is also popular with other cruise lines.

== Geography ==
The mouth of the Trollfjord where it joins the Raftsundet is only 100 metres (330 ft) wide. The fjord widens to a maximum width of 400 metres (1,300 ft). The mountains surrounding Trollfjord are between 600 and 900 metres (2,000 and 3,000 ft) high. It is surrounded by the 830-metre (2,720 ft) tall mountain Trollfjordtindan to the west and the 903-metre (2,963 ft) tall mountain Tverrdalstindan to the north. The Trollfjord reaches a maximum depth of 65 metres (213 ft) below sea level.

Prior to 1960, there was a waterfall at the end of Trollfjorden. However, it was redirected to produce hydroelectricity at a nearby power station.

=== Controversy ===
The location of the fjord is a bit of a local controversy. In 2016, the movie Downsizing was filmed in the Trollfjord and it was advertised and discussed in the media as having been filmed in Lofoten, a traditional region of Norway. This, however, upset some in the neighboring traditional region of Vesterålen who claim the fjord as part of their region as well. Both sides claim to be right. The fjord is located on Austvågøya island (which is often considered part of Lofoten), but it is also in Hadsel Municipality (which is often considered part of Vesterålen).

== History ==
=== The Battle of Trollfjord ===
The Battle of Trollfjord (Norwegian: Trollfjordslaget) was fought in 1890 between the first industrial, steam-driven fishing ships and teams of traditional open-boat fishermen over access to the fjord. Johan Bojer described the battle in his 1921 novel The last of the Vikings (Den siste Viking).

A painting by Gunnar Berg, Trollfjordslaget depicts The Battle at Trollfjord. The painting is currently located in the Art Galleri Gunnar Berg on the island Svinøya in Svolvær town.

=== Sailing into the Mousehole ===
In 1969 the TS Avalon, a British Rail ferry/cruise ship, sailed into the Trollfjord, nicknamed the Mousehole by Capt William Bramhill, the ship's master. It then turned 180 degrees and came out. The captain said the experience meant he "nearly gave birth to kittens". On his 1971 cruise Bramhill was relieved not to have to repeat the feat – all vessels were barred because of the danger of falling snow, ice and rocks. The Norwegian pilot, the same man as in 1969, remarked that the Avalon had the distinction of being the largest vessel to enter the fjord. Avalon had a gross register tonnage of 6,584 and 113 metres (371 ft) long; she carried 750 passengers in her role as a ferry but fewer on cruises.

It is possible that the "largest ship" record is now held by the Azamara Journey which has a gross register tonnage of 30,277 and is 181 meters (594 feet) in length. It sailed Trollfjord to the "mousehole" on Saturday, August 2, 2025 during a 16-night Norwegian cruise that began July 28 in Edinburgh.

== Media gallery ==
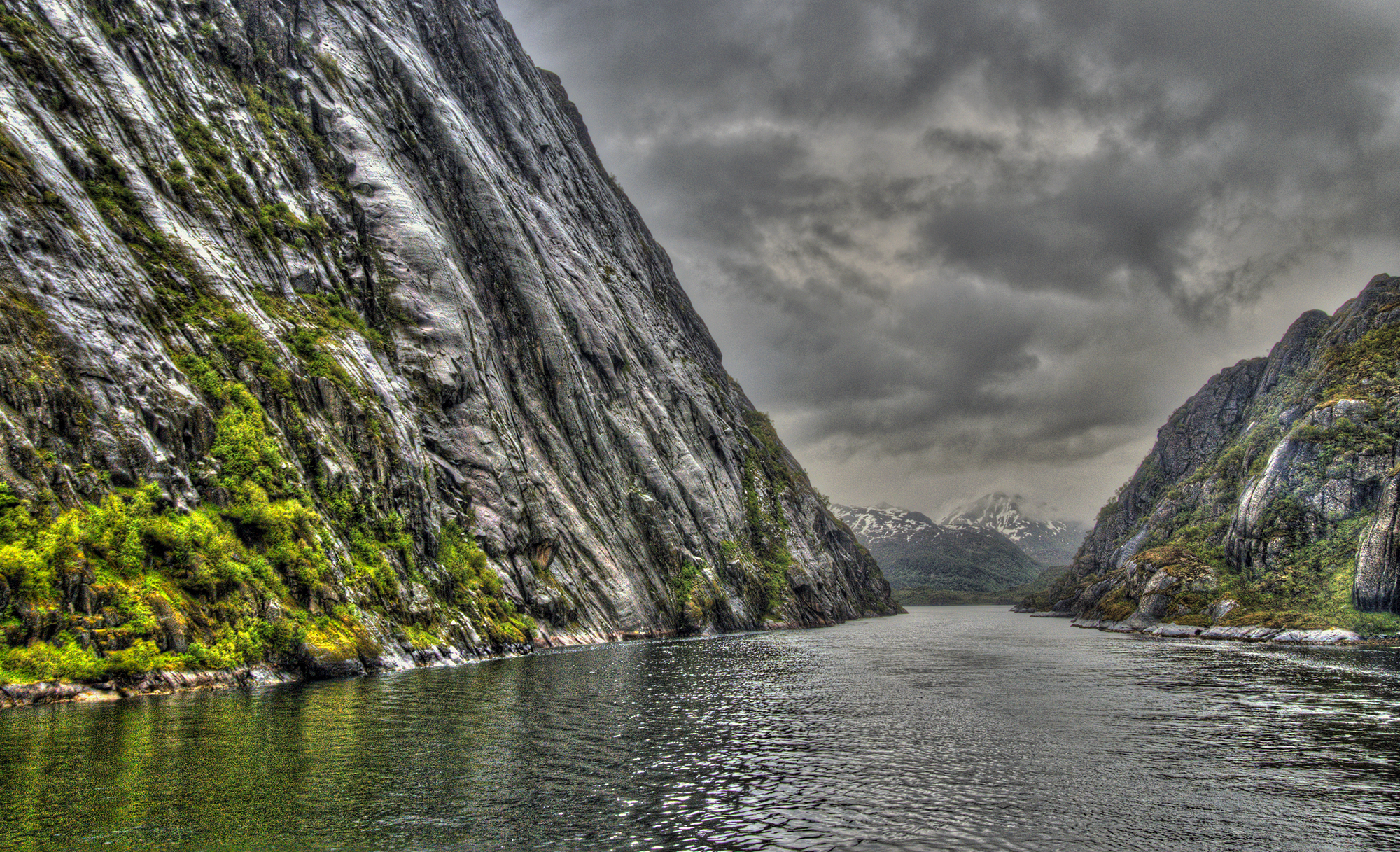
View of the fjord

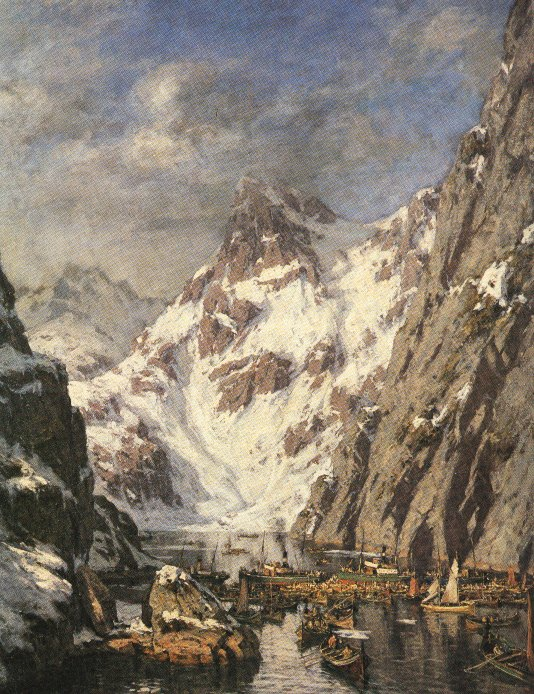
Trollfjordslaget (The Battle at Trollfjord) by Gunnar Berg

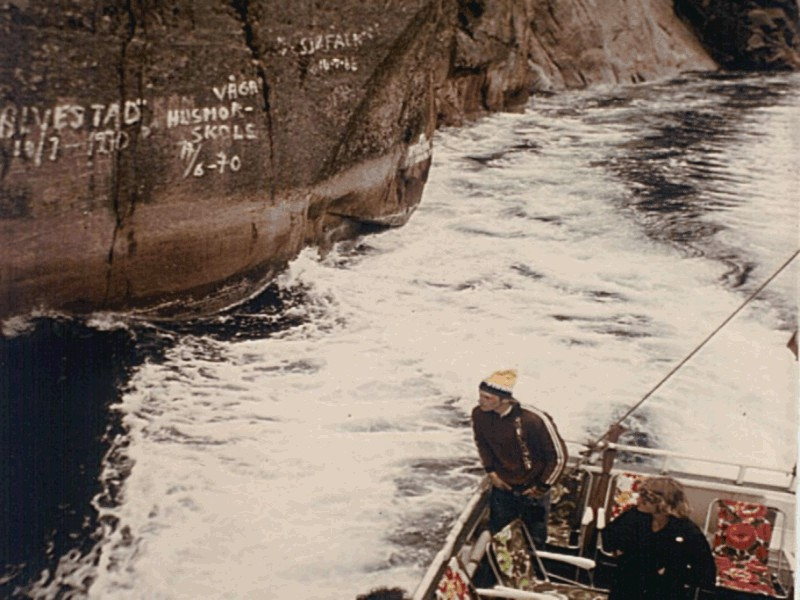
Trollfjord near Raftsund

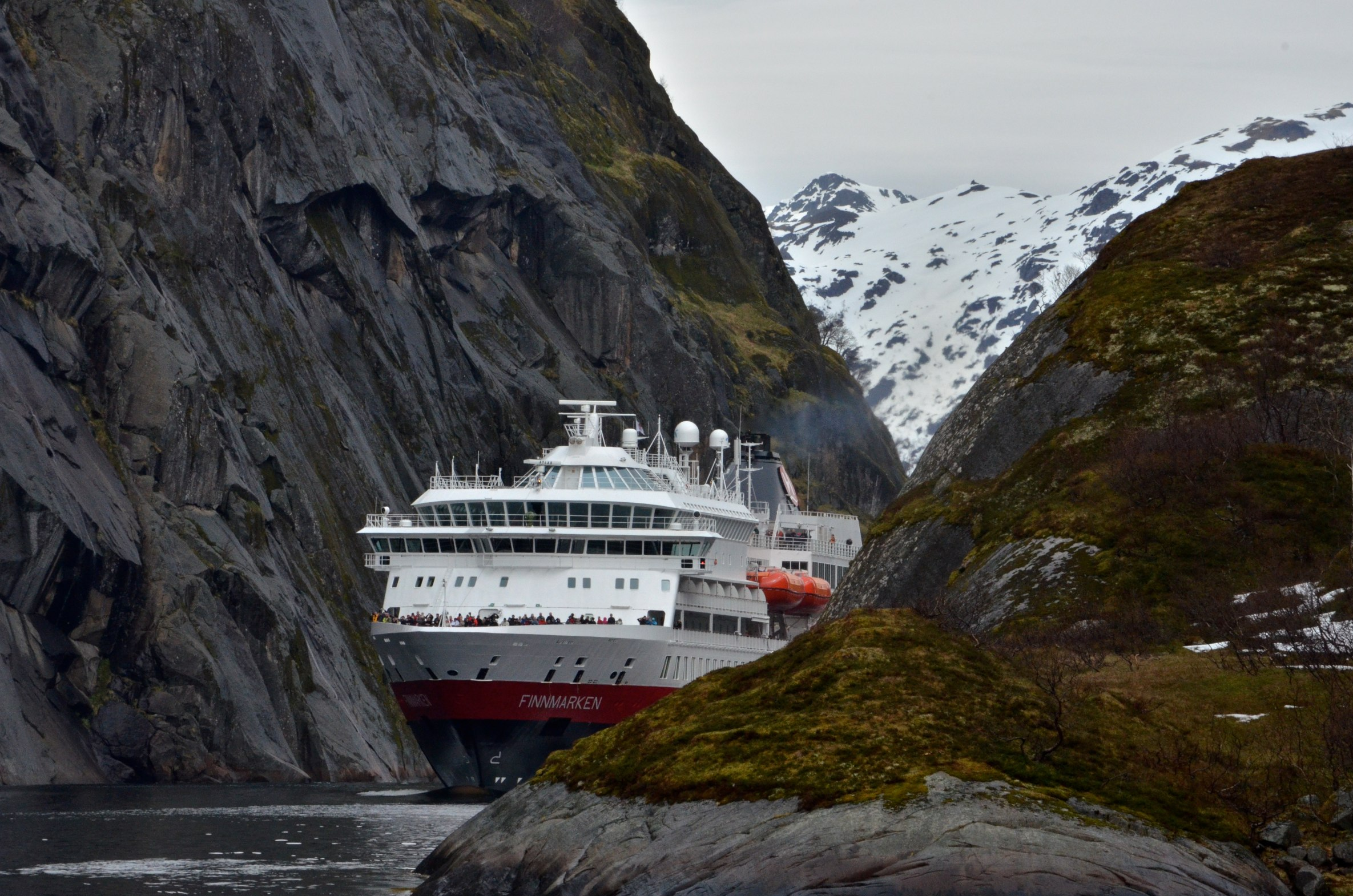
Hurtigruten entering the fjord

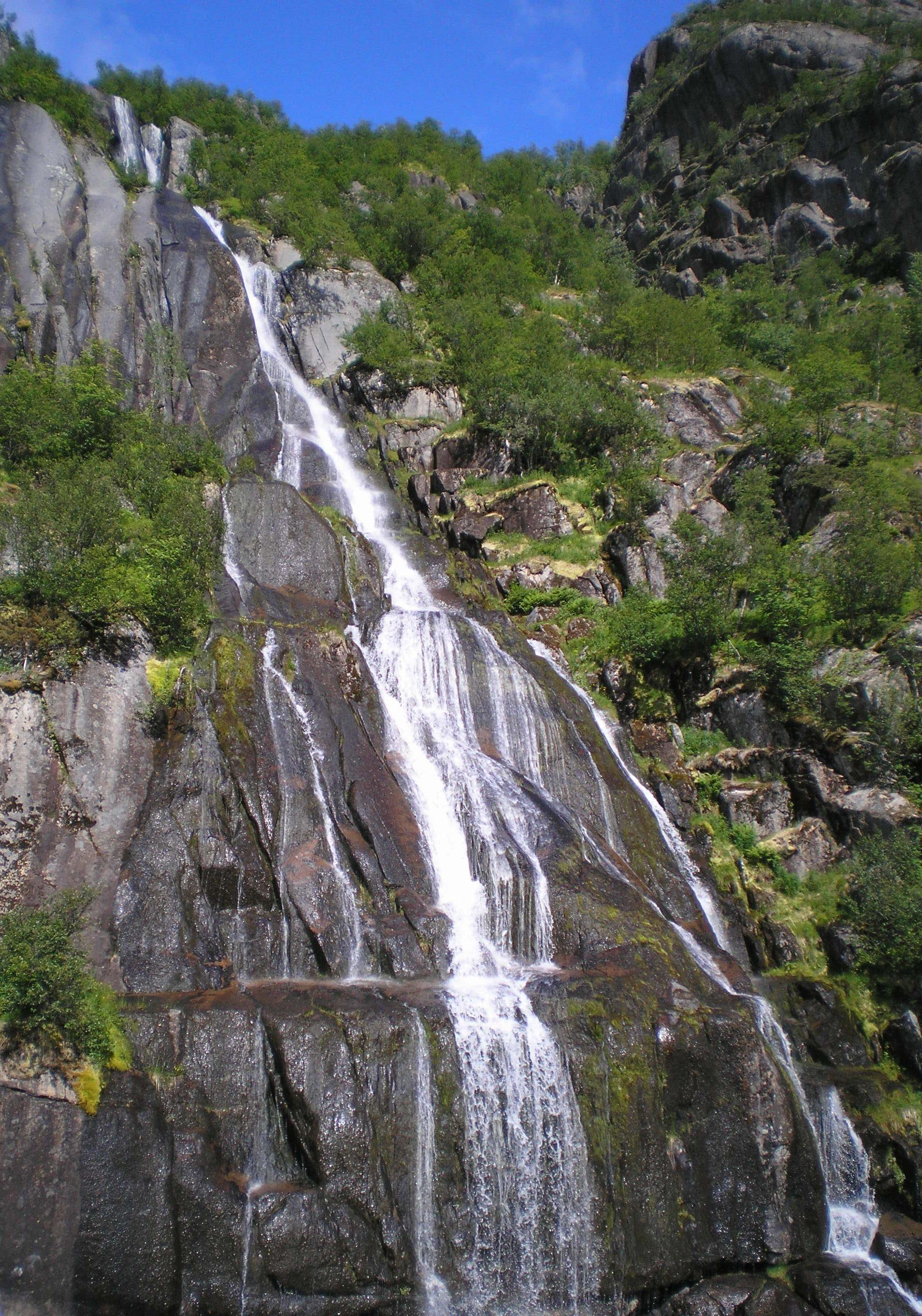
Waterfall on the sides of the fjord
