= Gimsøy Church =

- Gimsøy kirke
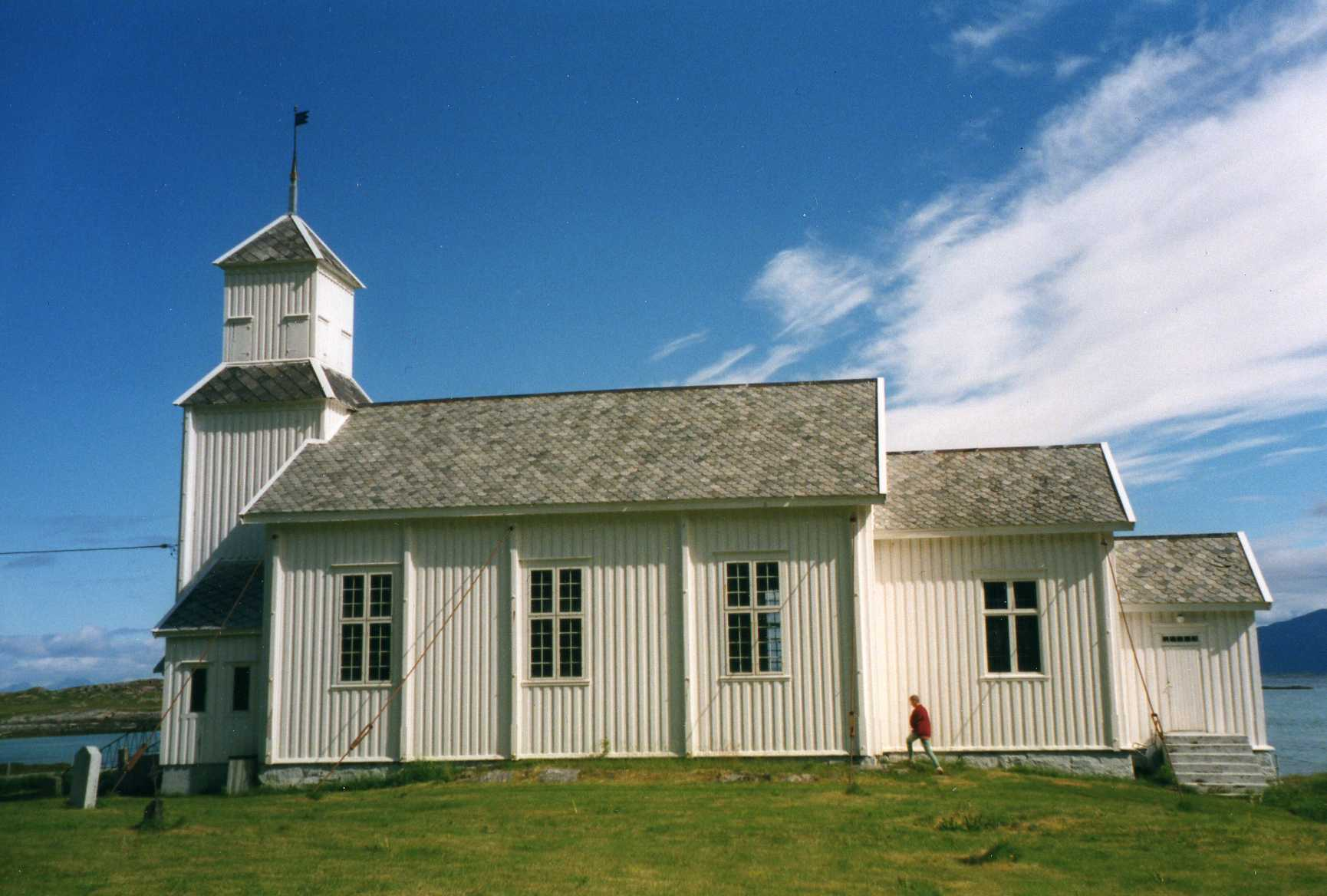
- View of the church
- Gimsøy Church
- 68.3205539°N 14.24144089°E
- Location: Vågan, Nordland
- Country: Norway
- Denomination: Church of Norway
- Churchmanship: Evangelical Lutheran

History
- Status: Parish church
- Founded: 14th century
- Consecrated: 18 October 1876

Architecture
- Functional status: Active
- Architect: Carl J. Bergstrøm
- Architectural type: Long church
- Completed: 1876 (150 years ago)

Specifications
- Capacity: 300
- Materials: Wood

Administration
- Diocese: Sør-Hålogaland
- Deanery: Lofoten prosti
- Parish: Gimsøy og Strauman
- Norwegian Cultural Heritage Site
- Type: Church
- Status: Not protected
- ID: 84244

Gimsøy Church (Norwegian: Gimsøy kirke) is a parish church of the Church of Norway in Vågan Municipality in Nordland county, Norway. It is located in the village of Gimsøysand on the island of Gimsøya. It is the main church for the Gimsøy og Strauman parish which is part of the Lofoten prosti (deanery) in the Diocese of Sør-Hålogaland. The white, wooden church was built in a long church style in 1876 using plans drawn up by the architect Carl J. Bergstrøm. The church seats about 300 people.

== History ==
Gimsøy Church has been around for a long time. The earliest existing historical records of the church date back to the year 1432 when Aslak Bolt referred to it in his writings, however the church was likely built during the 14th century. The church was originally located about 1.5 kilometres (0.93 mi) to the northwest in the village of Vinje. In 1706, the old building was torn down and a new church was constructed on the same site that same year. It was a small cruciform log building with a tower over the central part of the roof. In the year 1800, a new church was built about 1.5 kilometres (0.93 mi) to the southeast, along the shore of the island. After the new church was completed the old church was torn down.

In 1814, this church served as an election church (Norwegian: valgkirke). Together with more than 300 other parish churches across Norway, it was a polling station for elections to the 1814 Norwegian Constituent Assembly which wrote the Constitution of Norway. This was Norway's first national elections. Each church parish was a constituency that elected people called "electors" who later met together in each county to elect the representatives for the assembly that was to meet at Eidsvoll Manor later that year.

In 1874, the parish decided to build a new church to replace the small church they were currently using as well as change the location of the church. The new church was going to be built about 500 metres (1,600 ft) to the east of the location of the previous church. It would be a long church in timber with a sacristy next to the choir in the east and an entry porch and tower on the west end of the building. The new church was completed in 1876, and it was consecrated on 18 October 1876.

== See also ==
- List of churches in Sør-Hålogaland
