= Tysfjord Municipality =

Former municipality in Nordland, Norway

Tysfjord Municipality Tysfjord kommune Divtasvuona suohkan
- Former municipality
- Tysfjorden herred (historic name)
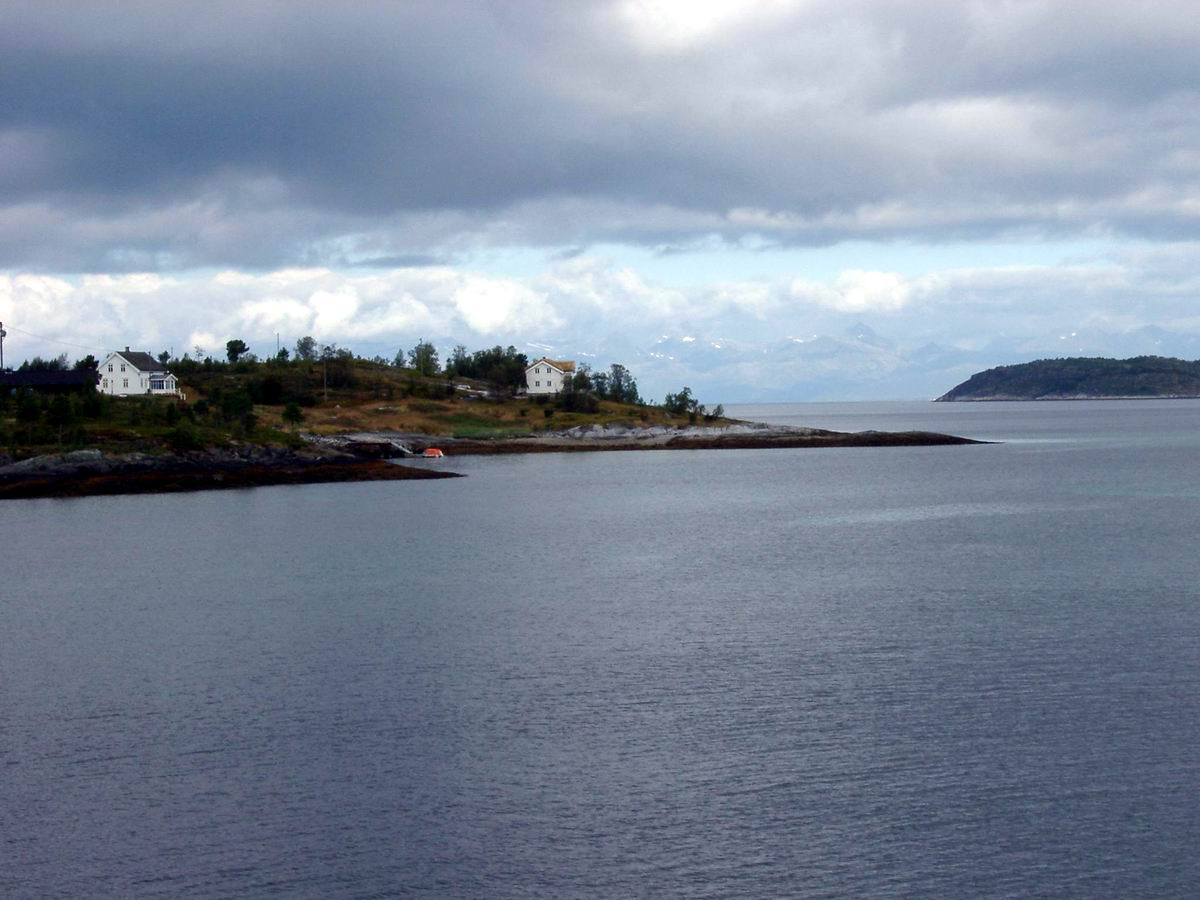
- View of the Skarberget area in Tysfjord

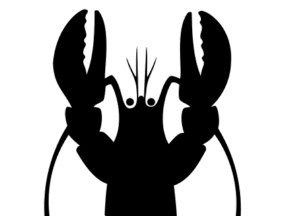
- Flag Coat of arms

- Nordland within Norway

- Tysfjord within Nordland
- Coordinates: 68°03′51″N 16°28′50″E
- Country: Norway
- County: Nordland
- District: Ofoten
- Established: 1 Jan 1869
  - Preceded by: Lødingen Municipality
- Disestablished: 1 Jan 2020
  - Succeeded by: Hamarøy Municipality & Narvik Municipality
- Administrative centre: Kjøpsvik

Government
  - Mayor (2011–2019): Tor Asgeir Johansen (Ap)

Area (upon dissolution)
  - Total: 1,463.76 km^{2} (565.16 sq mi)
  - Land: 1,358.18 km^{2} (524.40 sq mi)
  - Water: 105.58 km^{2} (40.76 sq mi) 7.2%
  - Rank: #56 in Norway
- Highest elevation: 1,520 m (4,990 ft)

Population (2019)
  - Total: 1,925
  - Rank: #330 in Norway
  - Density: 1.3/km^{2} (3.4/sq mi)
  - Change (10 years): ▼ −5.9%
- Demonym: Tysfjerding

Official languages
  - Norwegian form: Neutral
  - Sámi form: Lule Sami
- Time zone: UTC+01:00 (CET)
  - Summer (DST): UTC+02:00 (CEST)
- ISO 3166 code: NO-1850

Tysfjord (Norwegian) or Divtasvuodna (Lule Sami) is a former municipality in Nordland county, Norway. The municipality existed from 1869 until its dissolution in 2020. The area is now part of Narvik Municipality and Hamarøy Municipality in the traditional district of Ofoten. Its administrative centre was the village of Kjøpsvik. Other villages in Tysfjord included Drag, Hundholmen, Korsnes, Musken, Rørvika, Skarberget, and Storå.

There is a very large population of Lule Sami people in the area, and the Árran Lule Sami Center is in the village of Drag. With the Norwegian language and Lule Sami language both as official languages of the municipality, Tysfjord was the only municipality in Norway where speakers of Lule Sami should theoretically have been able to speak that language with officials, although this did not come completely to fruition.

At the time of its dissolution, Tysfjord was the 56th largest by area of the 422 municipalities in Norway and the 330th most populous, with 1,925 people in 1,464 km^{2} (565 sq mi), for a population density of 1.3 inhabitants per square kilometre (3.4/sq mi). During its final decade, its population had decreased by 5.9%.

== General information ==
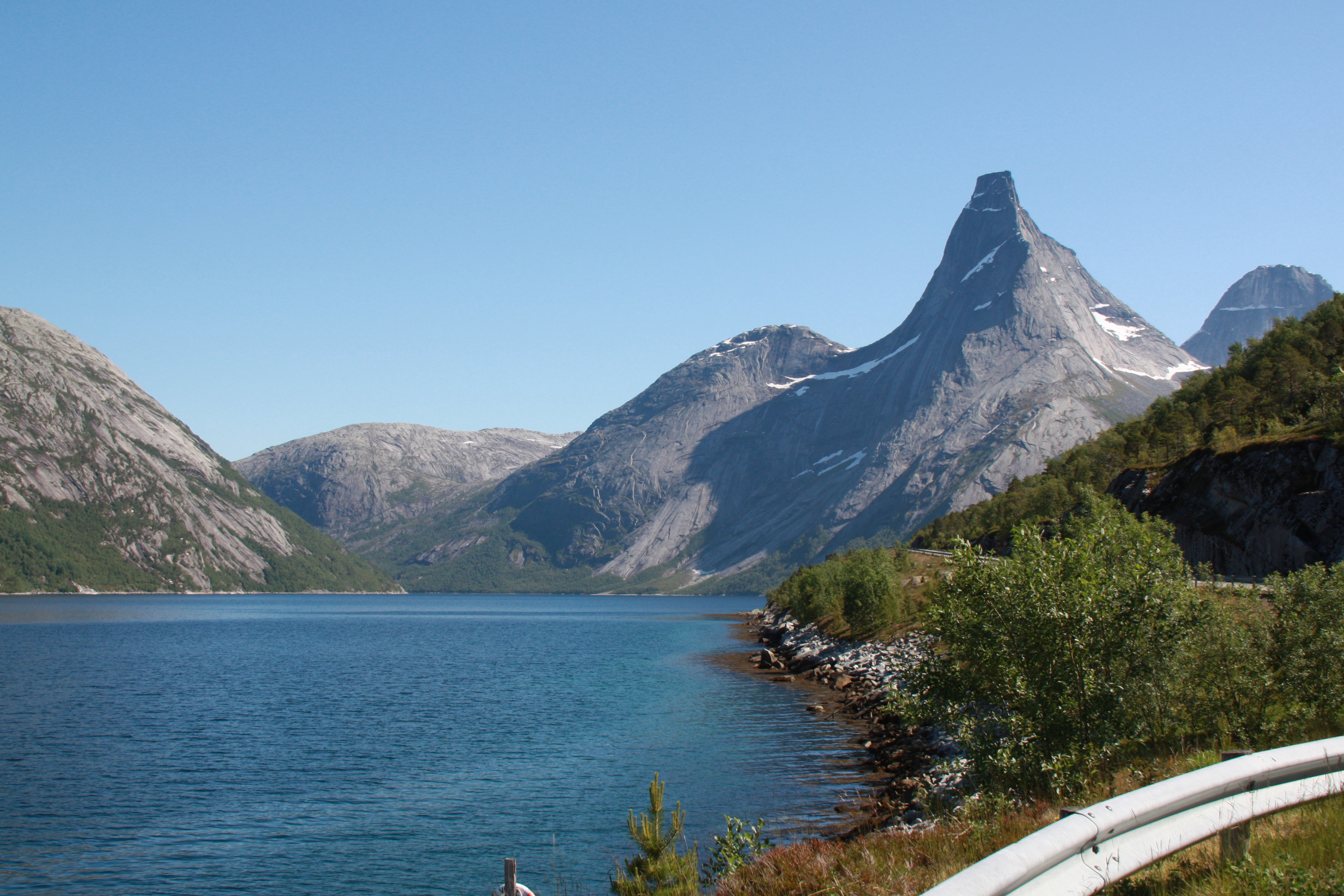
Stetind mountain and the fjord

The municipality of Tysfjord was established on 1 January 1869 when it was separated from the large Lødingen Municipality. Initially, the population of Tysfjord was 1,402. During the 1960s, there were many municipal mergers across Norway due to the work of the Schei Committee. On 1 January 1964, the Tysnes and Molvika areas (population: 33) located northwest of Bognes were transferred from the neighboring Hamarøy Municipality to Tysfjord Municipality.

On 1 January 2020, the municipality was dissolved and divided between its neighbors: Narvik Municipality and Hamarøy Municipality. This occurred because in 2017, the Parliament of Norway decided that Tysfjord Municipality would be divided along the fjord with the eastern half being merged with Narvik Municipality and Ballangen Municipality to form a new, larger Narvik Municipality and the remaining western half will be merged with Hamarøy Municipality on the same date.

=== Name ===
The municipality (originally the parish) is named after the local Tysfjorden since it was a central geographical feature in the area. There are several ideas on the derivation of the name. Historically, the name was spelled in Norwegian as Tyttisfjiorden. One thought is that the first element was the old name for the fjord Þýtir which may have come from the verb þjóta which means "blowing" (as in wind) or "rushing". The last element is fjord which means "fjord". Another thought is that the name Tysfjord is a Norwegianized form of the Lule Sami language name for the fjord, Divtasvuodna. The meaning of the first element divtas is unknown and the last element is vuodna which means "fjord". Another popular belief is that the Norwegian name is derived from the genitive case of the name of the Old Norse god Týr, but is the least plausible since the name Týr does not seem fit either with the Sami form or the oldest Norwegian spellings of the name.

Historically, the name of the municipality was spelled Tysfjorden. On 6 January 1908, a royal resolution changed the spelling of the name of the municipality to Tysfjord. On 7 October 2011, the national government approved a resolution to add a co-equal, official Lule Sami name for the municipality: Divtasvuodna. The spelling of the Sami language name changes depending on how it is used. It is called Divtasvuodna when it is spelled alone, but it is Divtasvuona suohkan when using the Sami language equivalent to "Tysfjord Municipality".

=== Coat of arms ===
The coat of arms was granted on 31 July 1987. The official blazon is "Argent, a lobster sable issuant from the base" (Norwegian: I sølv en oppvoksende svart hummer). This means the arms have a field (background) that has a tincture of argent which means it is commonly colored white, but if it is made out of metal, then silver is used. The charge is a lobster. The lobster was chosen because Tysfjord is the northernmost location of lobster habitat in the world. The original drawing included a lobster with claws of different size, such as they are in the natural population of lobsters in Tysfjord, but the National Archives opted for the same size claws to meet the standard heraldic conventions. The arms were designed by Esther Skoglund. The municipality originally adopted a design that showed Stetind mountain, but this was not approved by the National Archives, so the lobster design was chosen instead.

=== Churches ===
The Church of Norway had three parishes (sokn) within Tysfjord Municipality. It was part of the Ofoten prosti (deanery) in the Diocese of Sør-Hålogaland.

Churches in Tysfjord Municipality
Parish (sokn)	Church name	Location of the church	Year built
Drag/Helland	Drag/Helland Church	Drag	1972
Kjøpsvik	Kjøpsvik Church	Kjøpsvik	1975
Korsnes	Korsnes Church	Korsnes	1889

== History ==
There are prehistoric rock carvings at Leiknes showing scenes of hunting, and the world's oldest known depiction of an orca whale.

In 1948, an investigation that had lasted for years, was dismissed in regards to "a large group of Sami from Tysfjord". These individuals had worked as guides—guiding Norwegians who chose to flee into Sweden.

In 2016, media uncovered the sexual abuse of 11 women; this was followed by more reports of sexual abuse—the Tysfjord Affair.. 92 persons were the suspects, in regard to 151 cases of sexual abuse from the 1950s to 2017; at least 2 persons have been convicted. Around two-thirds of the victims and alleged abusers were Sami. 40 cases dealt with sexual intercourse with underage children.

=== Ethnicity ===
A 2004 article in Avisa Nordland estimated that out of 2,209 inhabitants, between 600 and 1000 are Sami.

== Government ==
While it existed, Tysfjord Municipality was responsible for primary education (through 10th grade), outpatient health services, senior citizen services, welfare and other social services, zoning, economic development, and municipal roads and utilities. The municipality was governed by a municipal council of directly elected representatives. The mayor was indirectly elected by a vote of the municipal council. The municipality was under the jurisdiction of the Ofoten District Court and the Hålogaland Court of Appeal.

=== Municipal council ===
The municipal council (Kommunestyre) of Tysfjord Municipality was made up of 17 representatives that were elected every four years. The tables below show the historical composition of the council by political party.

Tysfjord kommunestyre 2015–2019
Party name (in Norwegian)	Number of representatives
Labour Party (Arbeiderpartiet)	5
Centre Party (Senterpartiet)	2
Socialist Left Party (Sosialistisk Venstreparti)	1
Joint list of the Conservative Party (Høyre), Christian Democratic Party (Kristelig Folkeparti), and Liberal Party (Venstre)	4
Cross-Party List of Tysfjord (Tverrpolitisk liste for Tysfjord)	3
Tysfjord Municipal List (Tysfjord Bygdeliste)	2
Total number of members:	17
Note: On 1 January 2020, Tysfjord Municipality was divided between Narvik Municipality and Hamarøy Municipality.

Tysfjord kommunestyre 2011–2015
Party name (in Norwegian)	Number of representatives
Labour Party (Arbeiderpartiet)	7
Centre Party (Senterpartiet)	1
Socialist Left Party (Sosialistisk Venstreparti)	1
Joint list of the Conservative Party (Høyre), Christian Democratic Party (Kristelig Folkeparti), and Liberal Party (Venstre)	5
Cross-Party List of Tysfjord (Tverrpolitisk liste for Tysfjord)	2
Tysfjord Municipal List (Tysfjord Bygdeliste)	1
Total number of members:	17

Tysfjord kommunestyre 2007–2011
Party name (in Norwegian)	Number of representatives
Labour Party (Arbeiderpartiet)	5
Centre Party (Senterpartiet)	3
Socialist Left Party (Sosialistisk Venstreparti)	1
Joint list of the Conservative Party (Høyre), Christian Democratic Party (Kristelig Folkeparti), and Liberal Party (Venstre)	4
Cross-Party List of Tysfjord (Tverrpolitisk liste for Tysfjord)	2
Youth list in Tysfjord (Ungdomslista i Tysfjord)	2
Total number of members:	17

Tysfjord kommunestyre 2003–2007
Party name (in Norwegian)	Number of representatives
Socialist Left Party (Sosialistisk Venstreparti)	1
Joint list of the Conservative Party (Høyre), Christian Democratic Party (Kristelig Folkeparti), and Liberal Party (Venstre)	8
Cross-Party List of Tysfjord (Tverrpolitisk liste for Tysfjord)	7
Youth list in Tysfjord (Ungdomslista i Tysfjord)	1
Total number of members:	17

Tysfjord kommunestyre 1999–2003
Party name (in Norwegian)	Number of representatives
Labour Party (Arbeiderpartiet)	2
Socialist Left Party (Sosialistisk Venstreparti)	2
Joint list of the Conservative Party (Høyre), Christian Democratic Party (Kristelig Folkeparti), Centre Party (Senterpartiet), and Liberal Party (Venstre)	5
Cross-party list (Tverrpolitisk liste)	8
Sámi list for Tysfjord (Samelista for Tysfjord)	1
Outer Tysfjord local list (Ytre Tysfjord bygdeliste)	3
Total number of members:	21

Tysfjord kommunestyre 1995–1999
Party name (in Norwegian)	Number of representatives
Labour Party (Arbeiderpartiet)	4
Socialist Left Party (Sosialistisk Venstreparti)	2
Joint list of the Liberal Party, Midtre Nordland Sámi Politics, and Norwegian Sámi Association (Venstre, Midtre Nordland samepolitiske, og NSR liste)	1
Joint list of the Conservative Party (Høyre), Christian Democratic Party (Kristelig Folkeparti), and Centre Party (Senterpartiet)	6
Cross-party list for the Kjøpsvik area (Tverrpolitisk liste for Kjøpsvik og omegn)	7
Local list for Drag Helland (Bygdeliste for Drag Helland)	1
Total number of members:	21

Tysfjord kommunestyre 1991–1995
Party name (in Norwegian)	Number of representatives
Labour Party (Arbeiderpartiet)	10
Christian Democratic Party (Kristelig Folkeparti)	1
Socialist Left Party (Sosialistisk Venstreparti)	3
Joint list of the Liberal Party and independents (Venstre og uavhengiges liste)	1
Joint list of the Conservative Party (Høyre) and the Centre Party (Senterpartiet)	5
Local list for Drag Helland (Bygdeliste for Drag Helland)	1
Total number of members:	21

Tysfjord kommunestyre 1987–1991
Party name (in Norwegian)	Number of representatives
Labour Party (Arbeiderpartiet)	11
Christian Democratic Party (Kristelig Folkeparti)	2
Socialist Left Party (Sosialistisk Venstreparti)	3
Liberal Party (Venstre)	1
Joint list of the Conservative Party (Høyre) and the Centre Party (Senterpartiet)	5
Local list for Drag Helland (Bygdeliste for Drag Helland)	3
Total number of members:	25

Tysfjord kommunestyre 1983–1987
Party name (in Norwegian)	Number of representatives
Labour Party (Arbeiderpartiet)	12
Conservative Party (Høyre)	2
Christian Democratic Party (Kristelig Folkeparti)	2
Socialist Left Party (Sosialistisk Venstreparti)	2
Local list for north Tysfjord, Kjøpsvik, and east Tysfjord (Bygdeliste for Tysfjord nordre, Kjøpsvik og Tysfjord østre del)	2
Cross-party list for west Tysfjord (Tverrpolitisk liste for Tysfjord vestside)	4
Sámi People's List (Samefolkets lista)	1
Total number of members:	25

Tysfjord kommunestyre 1979–1983
Party name (in Norwegian)	Number of representatives
Labour Party (Arbeiderpartiet)	11
Conservative Party (Høyre)	3
Christian Democratic Party (Kristelig Folkeparti)	3
Centre Party (Senterpartiet)	2
Socialist Left Party (Sosialistisk Venstreparti)	2
Local list for Drag and Helland (Bygdeliste for Drag og Helland)	4
Total number of members:	25

Tysfjord kommunestyre 1975–1979
Party name (in Norwegian)	Number of representatives
Labour Party (Arbeiderpartiet)	12
Christian Democratic Party (Kristelig Folkeparti)	3
Socialist Left Party (Sosialistisk Venstreparti)	3
Joint list of the Conservative Party (Høyre), Centre Party (Senterpartiet), and Liberal Party (Venstre)	7
Total number of members:	25

Tysfjord kommunestyre 1971–1975
Party name (in Norwegian)	Number of representatives
Labour Party (Arbeiderpartiet)	14
Conservative Party (Høyre)	3
Christian Democratic Party (Kristelig Folkeparti)	2
Centre Party (Senterpartiet)	2
Liberal Party (Venstre)	1
Total number of members:	25

Tysfjord kommunestyre 1967–1971
Party name (in Norwegian)	Number of representatives
Labour Party (Arbeiderpartiet)	17
Conservative Party (Høyre)	3
Christian Democratic Party (Kristelig Folkeparti)	1
Centre Party (Senterpartiet)	4
Total number of members:	25

Tysfjord kommunestyre 1963–1967
Party name (in Norwegian)	Number of representatives
Labour Party (Arbeiderpartiet)	16
Conservative Party (Høyre)	4
Joint List(s) of Non-Socialist Parties (Borgerlige Felleslister)	5
Total number of members:	25

Tysfjord herredsstyre 1959–1963
Party name (in Norwegian)	Number of representatives
Labour Party (Arbeiderpartiet)	16
Communist Party (Kommunistiske Parti)	1
Joint List(s) of Non-Socialist Parties (Borgerlige Felleslister)	8
Total number of members:	25

Tysfjord herredsstyre 1955–1959
Party name (in Norwegian)	Number of representatives
Labour Party (Arbeiderpartiet)	15
Conservative Party (Høyre)	3
Communist Party (Kommunistiske Parti)	2
Christian Democratic Party (Kristelig Folkeparti)	3
Local List(s) (Lokale lister)	2
Total number of members:	25

Tysfjord herredsstyre 1951–1955
Party name (in Norwegian)	Number of representatives
Labour Party (Arbeiderpartiet)	18
Joint List(s) of Non-Socialist Parties (Borgerlige Felleslister)	6
Total number of members:	24

Tysfjord herredsstyre 1947–1951
Party name (in Norwegian)	Number of representatives
Labour Party (Arbeiderpartiet)	14
Communist Party (Kommunistiske Parti)	4
Christian Democratic Party (Kristelig Folkeparti)	7
Joint List(s) of Non-Socialist Parties (Borgerlige Felleslister)	9
Total number of members:	24

Tysfjord herredsstyre 1945–1947
Party name (in Norwegian)	Number of representatives
Labour Party (Arbeiderpartiet)	18
Local List(s) (Lokale lister)	6
Total number of members:	24

Tysfjord herredsstyre 1937–1941*
Party name (in Norwegian)	Number of representatives
Labour Party (Arbeiderpartiet)	15
List of workers, fishermen, and small farmholders (Arbeidere, fiskere, småbrukere liste)	3
Joint List(s) of Non-Socialist Parties (Borgerlige Felleslister)	6
Total number of members:	24
Note: Due to the German occupation of Norway during World War II, no elections were held for new municipal councils until after the war ended in 1945.

=== Mayors ===
The mayor (Norwegian: ordfører) of Tysfjord Municipality was the political leader of the municipality and the chairperson of the municipal council. Here is a list of people who held this position:

- 1869–1872: Peter Østbye
- 1873–1880: Arnoldus Schjelderup
- 1881–1882: Nikolai Norman
- 1883–1884: Olaf Holm
- 1885–1890: Johan Lagerfeldt
- 1891–1892: Nikolai Norman
- 1893–1896: Jens C. Davidsen
- 1897–1898: Nikolai Norman
- 1898–1901: Waldemar Pettersen
- 1901–1907: Karl Aasebøstøl
- 1910–1913: Andreas Davidsen
- 1913–1916: Waldemar Pettersen
- 1916–1919: Haldor Jenssen
- 1919–1928: Sigurd Storjord
- 1928–1934: Kristen Aasebøstøl (H)
- 1934–1941: Arnoldus Molvik (Ap)
- 1941–1945: Torgils Moe
- 1945–1945: Høier Olsen (Ap)
- 1946–1955: Kolbjørn Varmann (Ap)
- 1955–1959: Olav Mathisen (Ap)
- 1959–1968: Arne Solberg (Ap)
- 1968–1968: Fritz Tørnes (Ap)
- 1969–1971: Haldor Jenssen (Ap)
- 1971–1979: Birger Skårvik (Ap)
- 1979–1991: Edvard-Olav Stenbakk (Ap)
- 1991–1995: Jan-Arild Skogvoll (Ap)
- 1995–1999: Ivar Jakobsen (H)
- 1999–2003: Leif Kristian Klæboe (SV)
- 2003–2007: Kurt-Allan Nilsen (LL)
- 2007–2011: Anders Sæter (Sp)
- 2011–2019: Tor Asgeir Johansen (Ap)

== Economy ==
Due to the limestone in Tysfjord, a cement factory was established with production starting in 1920. The modern Norcem factory still is a vital employer in Kjøpsvik, with about 130 employees; since 1999 it has been a part of the German worldwide company Heidelberger Cement. Public services, some tourism, and agriculture are the other main sources of income in Tysfjord.

== Geography ==
The municipality is located along the Tysfjorden. The Tysfjorden is the second deepest fjord in Norway, with a maximum depth of 897 metres (2,943 ft). Tysfjord borders Ballangen Municipality in the north, Hamarøy Municipality in the south, Sweden in the east, and the Vestfjorden in the northwest. The island of Hulløya lies in the middle of the Tysfjorden.

The municipality is dominated by grey granite mountains; pine, birch, and aspen woodlands and forests; and the many fjord branches. Tysfjord's most dominant mountain, Stetinden, is famous in Norway. This 1,392-metre (4,567 ft) high natural granite obelisk, rising straight out of the fjord, is an awe-inspiring sight. In Norwegian, it is called gudenes ambolt which means the 'anvil of the gods', partly because the summit forms a plateau. This was selected to be the national mountain of Norway in the autumn of 2002. The famous British climber William C. Slingsby described it as "the ugliest mountain I ever saw"; he did not reach the summit.

The mountains near the border with Sweden have peaks up to 1,500 metres (4,921 ft) above sea level, and a large glacier, Gihtsejiegŋa is located in this area. The highest point in the municipality was the 1,520-metre (4,990 ft) tall mountain Bjørntoppen. There are several nature reserves in Tysfjord. Mannfjordbotn reserve has undisturbed forests at the head of a narrow fjord branch surrounded by granite mountain walls. From Hellemobotn, at the head of Hellemofjorden, the distance to the border with Sweden is only 6.3 kilometres (4 mi); this is also a scenic hiking terrain with a canyon opening up in Hellemobotn. There are also caves, such as the very deep Raggejavreraige. Lakes in the region include Baugevatnet, Båvrojávrre, Kilvatnet, Langvatnet, and Skilvatnet. Silver birch occurs in Tysfjord, as one of few areas in North Norway (silver birch need more summer warmth than the more common downy birch).

=== Nature ===
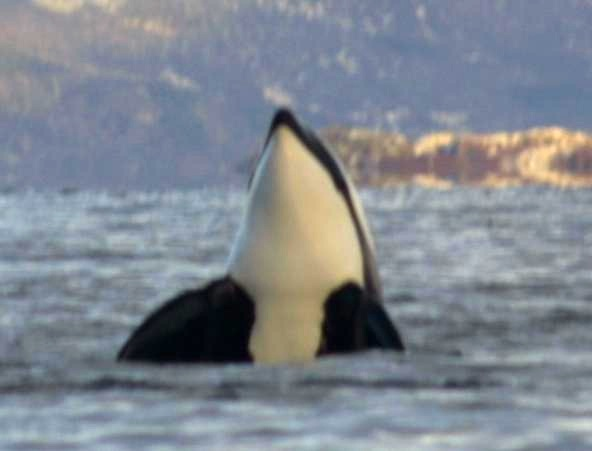
Orca taking a look above the water

For many years since 1990, a large part of the stock of Norwegian herring has stayed in the fjord in winter, one of the largest gatherings of biomass in the world. Large number of whales, orcas in particular, have followed to feed on the herring. This has attracted winter tourists from far away, but not in huge numbers. Since 2008, less herring and fewer orca have arrived in Tysfjord. Harbor porpoises, lobsters, white-tailed eagles, common ravens, European otters, and moose are all common in the Tysfjord area.

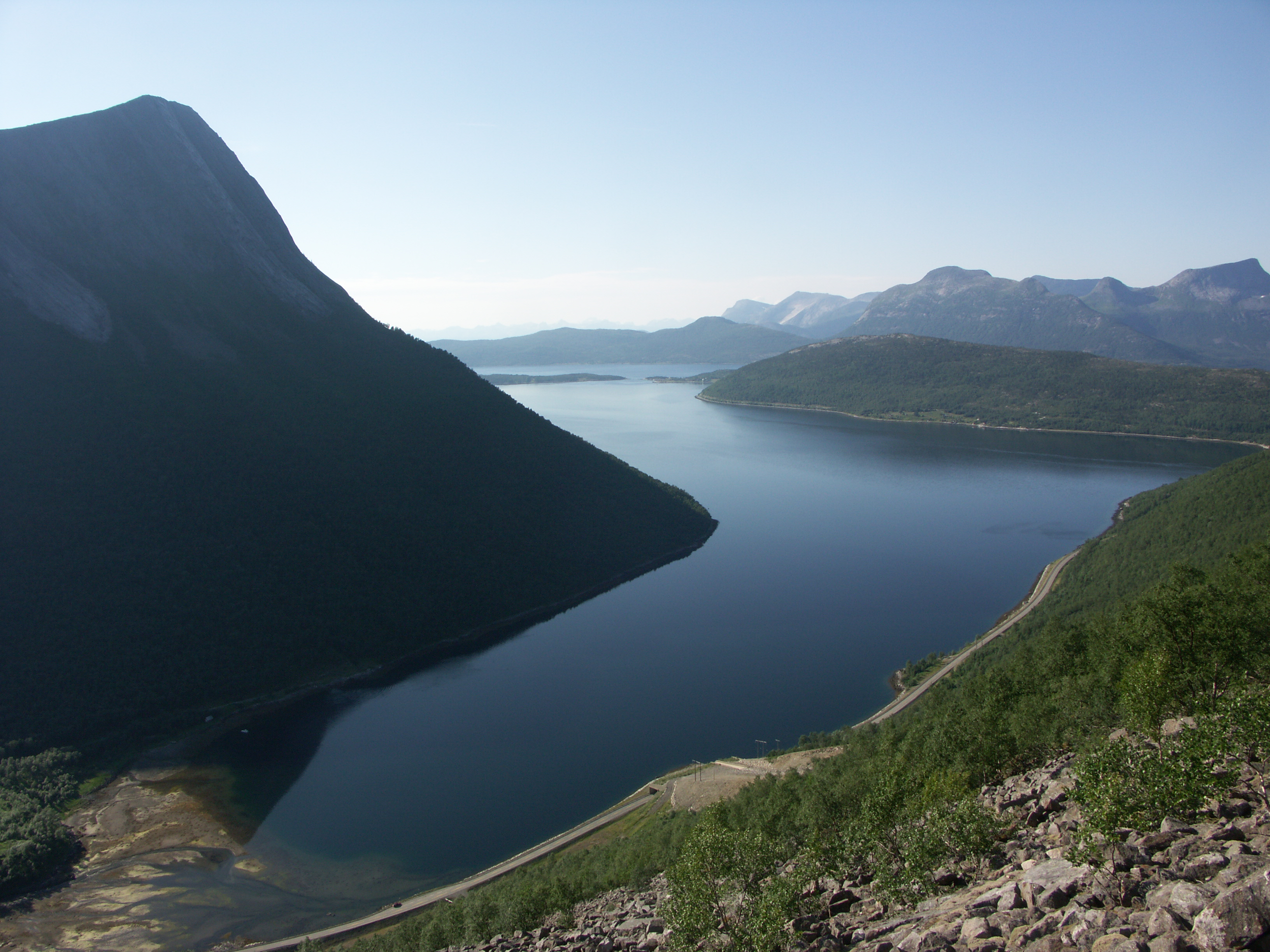
Rugged fjord scenery in Tysfjord

The coastal municipality of Tysfjord is better known for its whale watching than its birdwatching but the region has still a lot to offer. Thanks to a range of habitats the area has a varied birdlife. Though the area has no large seabird colonies, there is a small nature reserve at Ramnholmen with breeding populations of Arctic tern and common tern.

=== Climate ===
The climate is surprisingly temperate considering the location north of the Arctic Circle. Mean annual temperature in Kjøpsvik is 4.2 °C (40 °F) and mean annual precipitation is 1,080 millimetres (42.5 in). Summer is usually pleasant, although there might be persistent rain. Average monthly 24-hr temperature in June, July, and August is 10.9 °C (52 °F), 13.3 °C (56 °F), and 12.5 °C (55 °F), with average daily high about 16 °C (61 °F).

The average temperatures are below freezing for slightly more than 4 months, statistically from 17 November to 30 March, with January average of −2.7 °C (27 °F). October is the wettest month with on average 154 millimetres (6.1 in) precipitation, May is the driest with 54 millimetres (2.1 in).

The midnight sun can be seen from the end of May to mid-July, and the sun is below the horizon from the beginning of December to mid-January. The aurora borealis is commonly seen in winter and late autumn.

=== Villages ===
Villages in Tysfjord (names in both official languages)
Lule Sami	Norwegian
Ájládde	Hellandsberg
Ájluokta	Drag
Gásluokta	Kjøpsvik
Hierggenjárgga	Korsnes
Jågåsijdda	Storå
Måsske	Musken
Soahkeluokta	Bjørkvik
Stuorgiedde	Storjord
Tjierrekluokta	Nordbukt
Vuodnabahta	Hellemobotn

== Transport ==
Tysfjord was the only location in Norway where the European route E6 highway depended on a car ferry. There are ferry connections from Bognes to Skarberget (route E6) and from Bognes to Lødingen (connecting to route European route E10 and Lofoten). There is also a ferry connecting Drag south of the fjord with Kjøpsvik on the northern shore. Kjøpsvik is connected to the E6 highway and Narvik by Norwegian National Road 827, with no ferry crossings. This might be an alternative to route E6, and is also the route of choice to get close to the mountain Stetinden. If Tysfjord experiences bad weather and the ferry connections are shut down, Norway is cut in two road-wise. A road connection is still maintained, albeit through Sweden, which makes it a very long drive.

The closest airport is Evenes. There was also a small airport in Narvik.

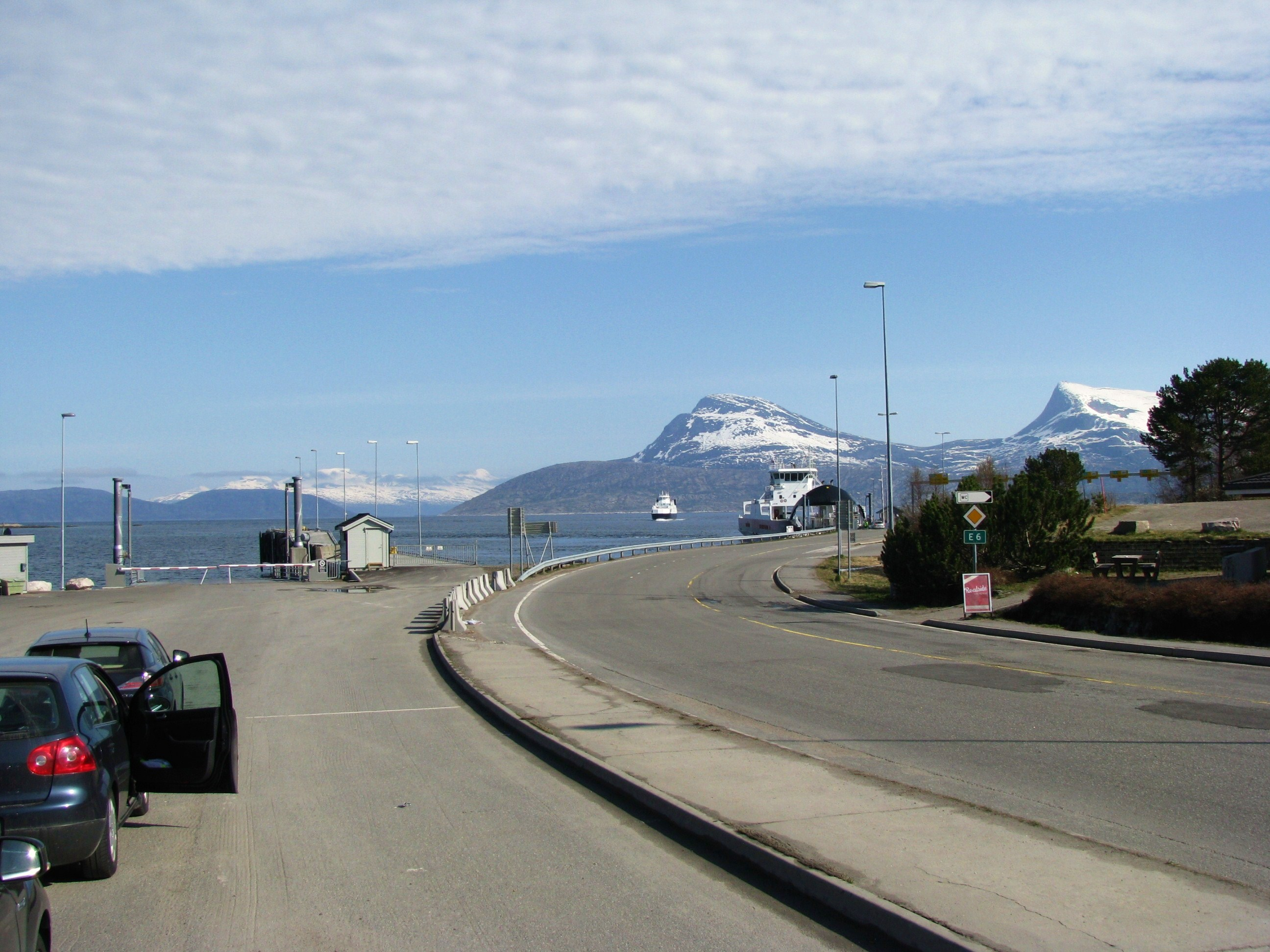
Bognes ferry harbour, southwestern shore of Tysfjord

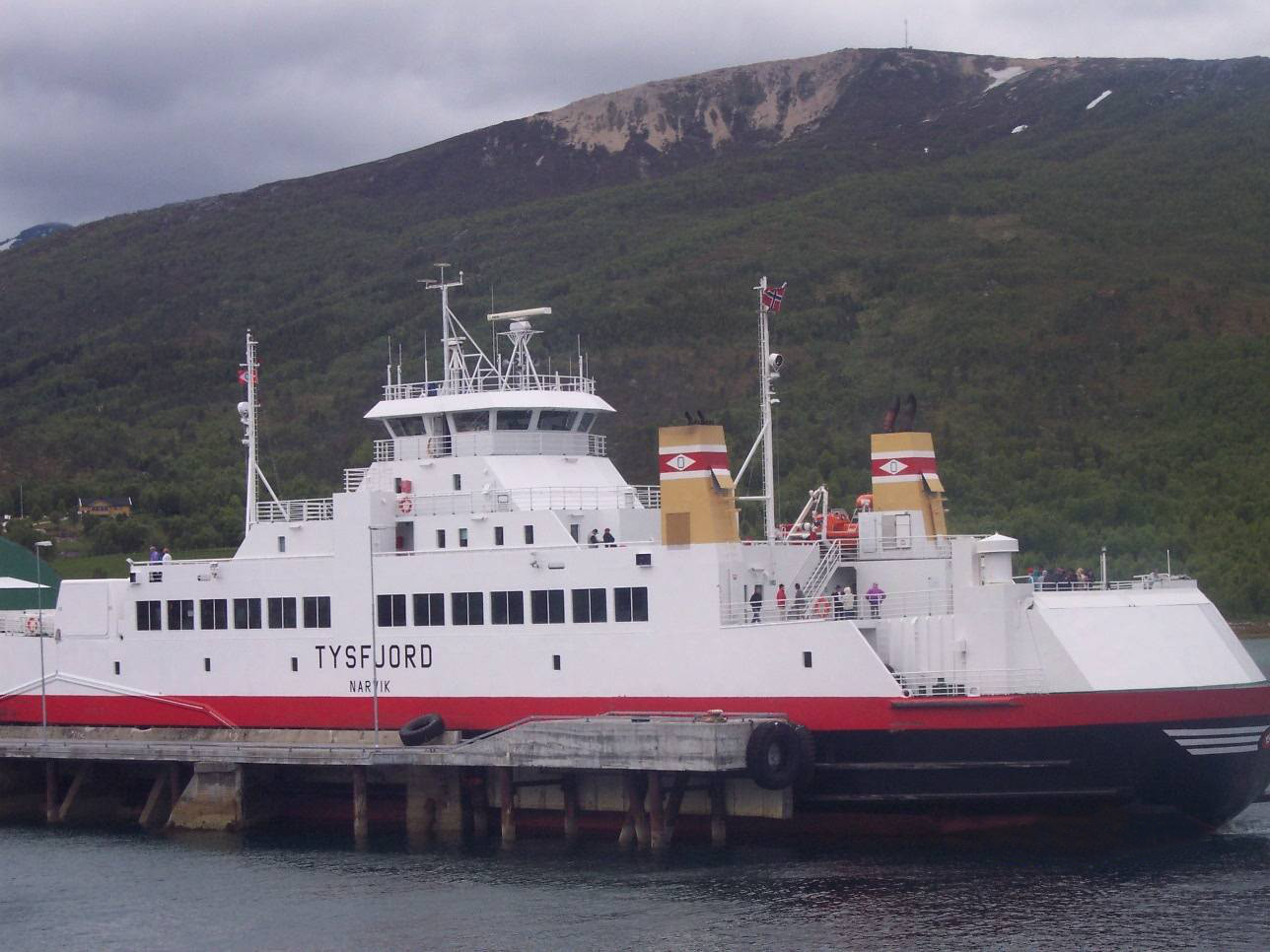
The car ferry connecting Bognes with Lødingen to the north

== See also ==
- List of former municipalities of Norway
