= Polar Line =

Abandoned railway project in Nordland, Norway

Coordinates: 67.4211°N 15.6664°E

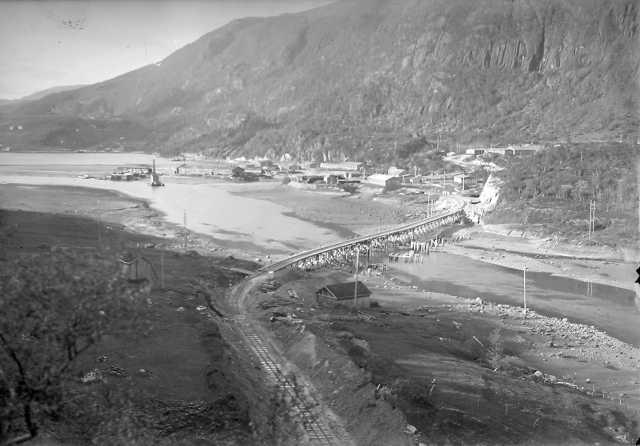

Overview
- Status: Never completed
- Termini: Fauske; Drag

Service
- Type: Railway
- System: Rail transport in Norway

Technical
- Number of tracks: Single
- Track gauge: 1,435 mm (4 ft 8 1/2 in) standard gauge
- Electrification: No

The Polar Line (Norwegian: Polarbanen, German: Polarbahn) is an incomplete and abandoned railway line in Norway, from Fauske to Narvik and, if finished, ultimately would have run 1,215 km (755 mi) to Kirkenes.

The railway was constructed by the Wehrmacht in occupied Norway during the Second World War as part of Festung Norwegen. At Fauske, the line connected with the Nordland Line, and construction stretched as far north as Drag in Tysfjord Municipality.

After the war, the plans were abandoned by Norwegian authorities, although from the 1970s, they were revitalized as part of the proposed Northern Norway Line. Some tunnels and bridges remain and part of the route has been used to build European Road E6.

== Route ==
The section of the Polar Line that was under construction in addition to NSB's three 1923 proposals.

Organizationally, the construction of the Polar Line started at Finneid. It ran through the Bratthaugen Tunnel before reaching Fauske, where Fauske Station was planned. At the time of German capitulation on 8 May 1945, most of the right-of-way through Fauske was completed. The line continued northwards, crossed Svartosen on a bridge and continued to the lake of Vallvatnet. There, a passing loop station was planned. The line continued to Straumen, where a station was planned 1 km (0.6 mi) north of the village. A power-station was built at Røyrvatnet. The line continued past the lake of Hellandsjøen. On the 4.9 km-long (3.0 mi) section from Hellandsjøen to Buvik, five tunnels were planned as well as a station at Hellbukta.

At Megården, 24 km (15 mi) from Fauske, 554 m (1,818 ft) of Megården Tunnel were built. At Trengsel, 27 km (17 mi) from Fauske, the Trengsel Bridge was planned. After passing Torkildseng, 28 km (17 mi) from Fauske, the line was to run through two short tunnels. Stations were planned Løktehaugen and Kvarv, 31 and 39 km (19 and 24 mi) from Fauske, respectively. Between the two stations 18 tunnels were planned. A power station was built at Kvarv. The line was planned to run through the 2,710 m-long (8,890 ft) Espenes Tunnel before reaching the next station at Kalvik, 47 km (29 mi) from Fauske.

The next station was to be at Sommerset, 52 km (32 mi) from Fauske, followed by a station at Lappstorvik and then reached Sørfjord. The next two stations were at Kobbvatnet and Gjerdalen, after which the line would have run through the Basis Tunnel and the Sildhopfjell Tunnel, the latter 77 km (48 mi) from Fauske. It would have then continued through the 5,070 m-long (16,630 ft) Tennvatn Tunnel, the 2,720 m-long (8,920 ft) Tennvatn Tunnel and the Falkelva Tunnel. Stations would have been built at Kråkmo and Sandnes, 91 and 100 km (57 and 62 mi) from Fauske, respectively. The line would then run through the 2,000 m-long (6,600 ft) Hellarvik Tunnel just before reaching at station at Tømmernes, 110 km (68 mi) from Fauske. At 123 km (76 mi) from Fauske lay the Trollpollhaugen Tunnel after which the station reached Drag, 130 km (81 mi) from Fauske.

From Bjørnfjell, the line would have hugged the Norway–Sweden border into the county of Troms, before running down the Salangsdalen valley. It would pass through the villages of Setermoen and Andselv before running west of the lake of Takvatnet. It would then have reached Balsfjorden, which it would have hugged until reaching Nordkjosbotn. It would cross across Balsfjordeidet to Storfjorden, which is would follow on the east shore of. There it would have passed through the village of Skibotn and run around the Kåfjorden and through Kåfjordbotn. It would then have run along Rotsundet into Nordreisa Municipality, which would have been located 335 km (208 mi) from Bjørnfjell.

The line would have continued down the Reisadalen valley, following the Reisaelva river for about 85 km (53 mi), at which point it would make a large S-bend around the lake of Ráisjávri. It would then run to 140 km (87 mi) from Nordreisa Municipality to Kautokeino Municipality, from where it would run north-eastwards. It would then have crossed the Finnmarksvidda plateau and reached Karasjok, 280 km (170 mi) from Nordreisa. The line would then have run northwards, running along the Finland–Norway border and the Tana River until reaching Skiippagurra, 450 km (280 mi) from Nordreisa. From there, it would have run along the south shore of Varangerfjorden and around Kjøfjorden until reaching Kirkenes.

== History ==
=== Planning ===
The Nordland Line, which was originally proposed to run from Trondheim to Helgeland, was first launched by Ole Tobias Olsen in 1872. By 1892, surveying on parts of the route had been started. The first specific plans for a railway north of Fauske was presented by the Norwegian State Railways (NSB) in 1901, which proposed the line be built to Røsvik with a branch to Bodø. The first part of the Nordland Line, the Hell–Sunnan Line, was completed in 1905.

In the Railway Plan of 1923, a 306 km-long (190 mi) line between Fauske and Narvik was included and estimated to cost 160 million Norwegian krone (NOK). At the same time, the Standing Committee on Railways stated that the Nordland Line would not meet its function until it had crossed Finnmark. A report on the section from Narvik to Kvesmenes was published in March 1923, followed by the section from Kvesmenes to Alteidet in June 1926, Alteidet to Porsangerfjorden in December 1926, from Porsangerfjorden to Tana in June 1927, from Tana to Vadsø in January 1928 and from Nyborg to Kirkenes in April 1928. The distance from Fauske to Vadsø was 1,144 km (711 mi) and from Fauske to Kirkenes 1,215 km (755 mi). Construction was estimated to cost 375 million kr.

NSB completed the Nordland Line to Mosjøen in 1940. Following the German occupation of Norway, construction of the line was accelerated. On 11 December 1940, the Reichskommissariat Norwegen requested that NSB submit their plans. The plans north to Narvik were sent 21 March 1941 and the plans to Kirkenes on 20 January 1942. NSB had three different proposals for the route between Fauske and Narvik. The first—the Ferry Line—was a railway from Fauske to Korsnes on Tysfjorden and onwards to Narvik by train ferry. It would also include a ferry terminal at Tjeldsundet, where there would be a connection northwards towards Kirkenes. The second alternative—the Fjord Line—would run via Tømmerneset, Innhavet and Musken, around the southern end of Tysfjorden and then followed the shoreline to Ballangen to Narvik. The third—the Mountain Line—would follow an inland route from Kobbvatnet up Gerdalen and then through a long tunnel to Tysfjorden. The Fjord Line was 40 km (25 mi) longer than the Mountain Line, but considerably cheaper to build. A fourth proposal, launched by the Wehrmacht, was to build a ferry crossing of Tysfjorden, but otherwise build closely to that of the Fjord Line.

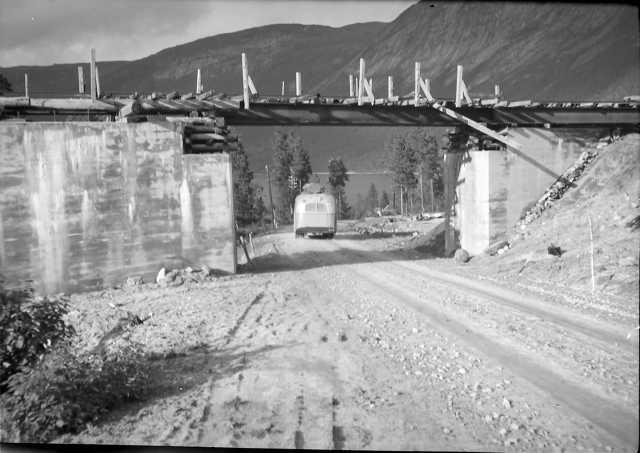
Underpass of the Polar Line in Hamarøy Municipality in 1947

The alternatives were considered by Vienna-based Ladislaus von Rabcewicz. He considered the alternatives based on that the railway would be extended to Kirkenes, that the railway should be built as quickly as possible, and considering the line's strategic location. Of military-strategic concerns, he discarded the proposals which involved a ferry. The Fjord Line was considered advantageous gradients and close access to the fjords would allow for more work days per year. However, it had four tunnels longer than 5 km (3.1 mi), five tunnels between 4 and 5 km (2.5 and 3.1 mi), three tunnels between 3 and 4 km (1.9 and 2.5 mi), five tunnels between 2 and 3 km (1.2 and 1.9 mi) and twelve tunnels shorter than 2 km (1.2 mi). Rabcewicz stated that it would be necessary with immediate start of construction for all tunnels longer than 2.8 km (1.7 mi), with the establishment of 24 breaking-in points.

Rabcewicz recommended a mountain line, but chose to build it to intersect with the Ofoten Line at Bjørnfjell, and use that line as a branch to reach Narvik, rather than build the line directly to the town. The Mountain Line could be built faster because of shorter tunnels, the longest being 5.5 km (3.4 mi), which with an estimated 4 m (13 ft) per day would give a construction time of 33 months. The other main advantage of the line was that it lay so far inland that an Allied attack would be improbable. However, Rabcewicz noted several disadvantages of the line, including steeper gradients, the lack of any fjords or residents between Kobbvatnet and Bjrnfjell and the increased amount of snow in the area. He estimated that the line could be completed by June 1945 given a work-force of 83,700 men.

Planning of the route from Narvik to Kirkenes was led by Professor Flörke in Narvik. The first report was published on 4 July 1942, regarding the route from Kvesmenes to Skibotn. The report considered three proposals, that of NSB from the 1920s, that of the Reichskommissariat's railway division and that of the Flörke's group. NSB had recommended a route which followed the coastline, but Flörke stated that for military-strategic reasons this route had to be discarded. He further wanted to avoid long tunnels to decrease construction time. He also remarked that NSB's maps did not match the terrain, forcing his office to take aerial photography of the route from Nordreisa to Skippagurra between May and August 1942, while Narvik to Nordreisa was photographed between June and August. Plans consisting of the section from Setermoen to Nordreisa (325 km (202 mi) from Bjørnfjell) were sent to Einsatzgruppe Wiking in Oslo on 8 July 1942. The plans from Bjørnfjell to Setermoen were sent on 23 July.

=== Construction ===
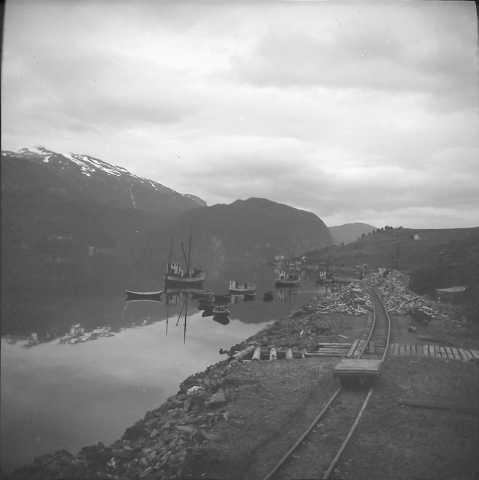
Remains of the Polar Line at Kobbelvvågen in 1950

As part of Operation Barbarossa—the German invasion of the Soviet Union—plans were immediately dispatched to complete a railway to Kirkenes. The responsibility was given to Organisation Todt. Plans called for the Nordland Line to be completed to Rognan on 1 August 1943 and later that same year to Fauske. Construction of the section north of Fauske was, unlike the section southwards, without any Norwegian participation, including that of NSB.

Construction was organized by Einsatzgruppe Wiking which was based in Mo i Rana and had clerks of works in Fauske and Tømmerneset. The work was performed through a number of German construction companies. Construction on the Polar Line started in January 1943. The first part of construction was for auxiliary facilities, such as barracks, quays and power supply. The workforce largely provided by Russian and Serbian prisoners of war (POW). Despite the enormous amount of labour construction of the railway was notoriously inefficient and the part of the railway which were completed further south was of such bad quality that most of the permanent way had to be replaced. North of Tysfjorden, the only work was a tote road between Narvik and Bjørnfjell.

The area the line was being built was without road connection, and the steep terrain made it difficult to place the railway elsewhere than close by the fjords. As this was also the place where people lived, it caused a conflict of interest. According to the peace-time compulsory purchase law, the state was forced to pay due compensation for any land they needed to build public infrastructure. However, the Germans showed no interest in following these laws, took what property they needed, often without even informing the locals. In Lappstorvika, the road became so dilapidated that the locals chose to move away until after the war.

Thirty thousand POWs were brought to work on the railway through Norland. The treatment of the POWs varied depending on their nationality, their status in regard to the Geneva Convention and their alignment. Russians who converted to support Andrey Vlasov were treated better and often sent to own camps. Similarly, only two of over 1,000 Polish POWs in Nordland died, and were treated better because Polish people were generally regarded as pro-Axis. Wehrmacht invested the equivalent of NOK 15 million in labour and other costs in the line. At the time of the German capitulation on 8 May 1945 there were an estimated 8,300 POWs living in camps on the segment between Fauske and Drag. About ten percent of those who had worked on the line had died.

On 4 December 1945, the Embassy of the Soviet Union in Oslo and the Norwegian Ministry of Foreign Affairs started work on a common Norwegian–Soviet commission which would investigate issues regarding Russian POWs in Norway. The commission was established in March 1946. Both NSB and Norwegian authorities were concerned that the Soviet goal was to claim compensation for the effective work which the POWs had done in Norway. Although vague estimates of the number of man-hours were calculated, no monetary value was ever determined, and no claim was submitted to the Norwegian authorities from the Soviet Union.

== Legacy ==
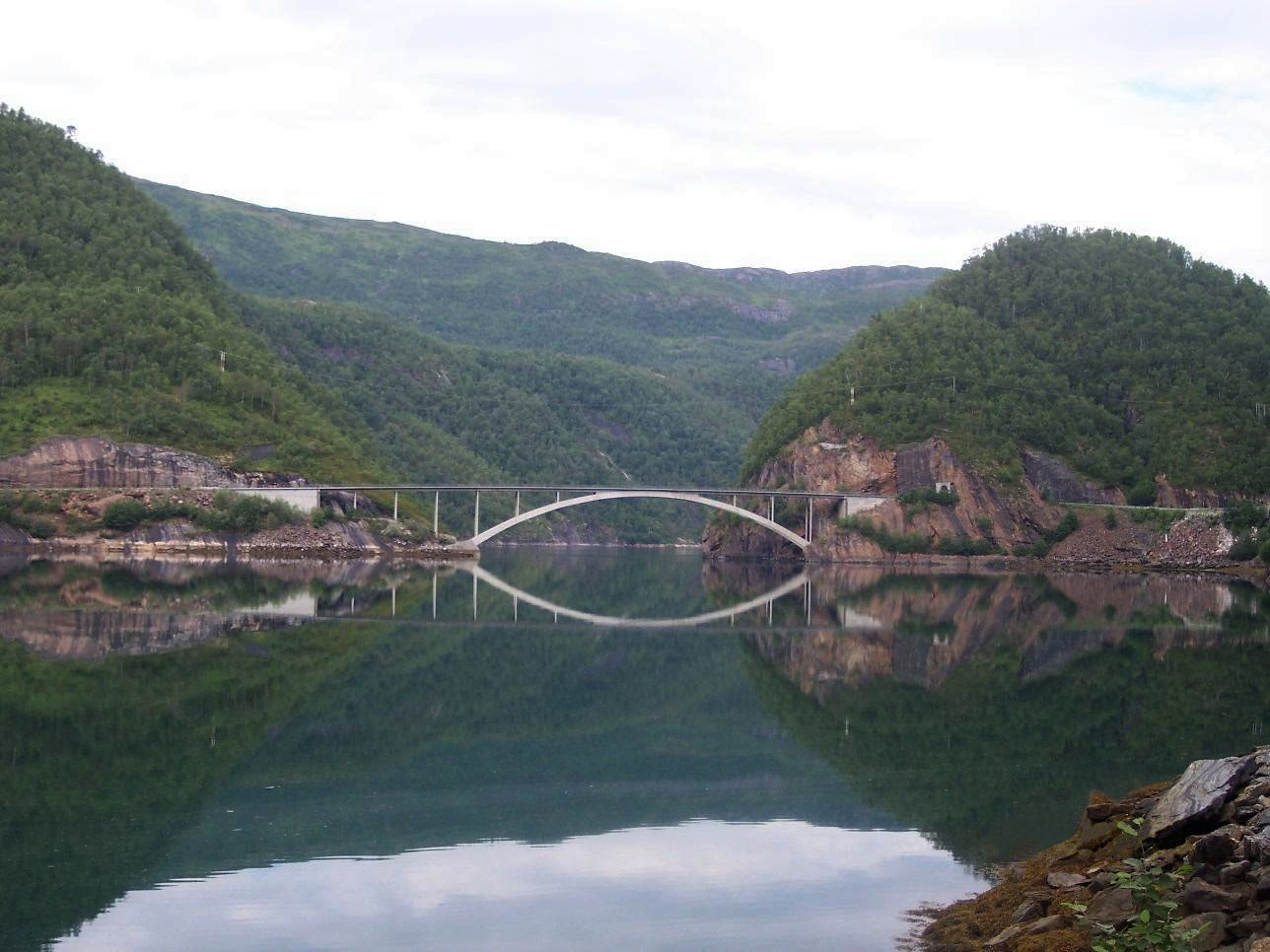
Trengsel Bridge on European Road E6 was originally planned as part of the Polar Line and part of a tunnel is still visible from the road.

The Nordland Line was completed to Bodø in 1962. In the 1960s, Parliament voted to pause any further plans to build a railway northwards for ten years. Instead, the road network was to be expanded. Starting in the 1970s, a series of regional airports were built, largely undermining the need for the railway for passenger transport. In 1968, NSB again considered the Northern Norway Line, a proposal to extend the Nordland Line from Fauske via Narvik to Harstad and Tromsø. The Ministry of Transport and Communications recommended that the line not be built. However, during the 1970s, income from petroleum production started a public debate as to whether the income should be used on domestic infrastructure investments.

In 1977, the Ribu Commission was established to look into building a new railway north of Fauske. The commission made no clear recommendation as to whether the line should be built, but stated although it had a cost of NOK 4.4 billion and would need operating subsidies, it would provide a positive economic impact on the region, particularly if additional industrial and commercial investments were made along the route. Parliament did not make a decision when it debated the commission's report in 1983. Instead, a new report was issued in 1992. This time it was planned as a high-speed railway, but in 1994, the project was rejected by Parliament.

When the E6 highway was built northwards from Fauske during the 1960s, parts of the right-of-way built for the Polar Line was used for the road. Specifically, the highway follows the railway route from Fauske past Vallvatnet to a point beyond Straumen, in addition to a section of the right-of-way past Torkilseng. The road also used tunnels built at Asp, Eva, Espenes, Kobbvatnet and north of Tømmerneset.

== 2019 study ==
In 2019, the Norwegian Railway Directorate signed an agreement with Asplan Viak to study the development of a line from Fauske via Narvik to Tromsø. The Fauske – Tromsø Line would be around 375 kilometres (233 mi) long, while the Bjerkvik – Harstad line would be just over 80 kilometres (50 mi) long. The analyses found the full scheme development would cost 113 billion kr, while the line to Harstad would cost around 20 billion kr. The analysis showed that it would cost more than 100 billion kr (US$ 11.6 billion). However, the Norwegian Railway Directorate says the line will not be economically viable, as calculations show a net loss for the state of between 46 billion kr and 109 billion kr.
