= Bårjås =

Sami language popular science magazine in Norway

Bårjås is a popular scientific journal that is published in Norway. The journal is published once a year in the Lule Sámi and Norwegian languages since 1999.

The journal is published by the Árran Lule Sami Center and museum which is located in the village of Drag in Hamarøy Municipality (originally it was in Tysfjord Municipality before 2020). As of 2009, the magazine was edited by Lars Magne Andreassen and Ronny Nergård.
