= Rørvik (disambiguation) =

Rørvik or Rørvika (or the anglicized Rorvik) may refer to:

== People ==
- David Rorvik (born 1944), American writer

== Places ==
- Rørvik, a town in Nærøysund Municipality in Trøndelag county, Norway
- Rørvik Airport, Ryum, the airport near the town of Rørvik in Nærøysund Municipality in Trøndelag county, Norway
- Rørvik, Møre og Romsdal, a village on the island of Vigra in Giske Municipality in Møre og Romsdal county, Norway
- Rørvika, a village in Hamarøy Municipality in Nordland county, Norway
- Rørvika, Trøndelag, a village and ferry quay in Indre Fosen Municipality in Trøndelag county, Norway

== See also ==
- Røyrvik Municipality, a similarly-spelled municipality in Trøndelag county, Norway
