= Kjøpsvik Church =

Church in Nordland, Norway

- Kjøpsvik kirke
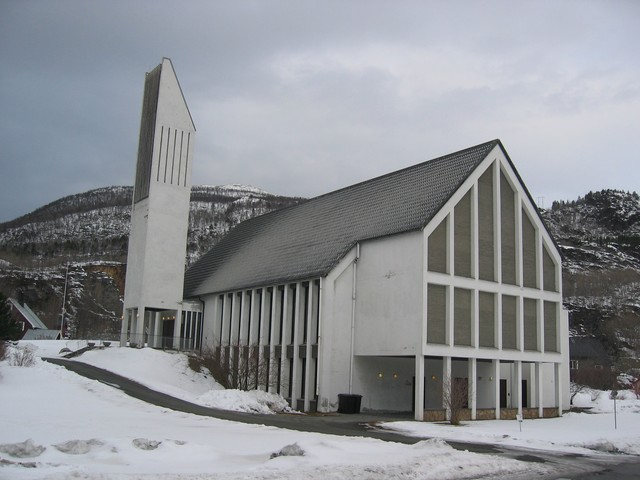
- View of the church
- Kjøpsvik Church
- 68.0968326°N 16.37446358°E
- Location: Narvik Municipality, Nordland
- Country: Norway
- Denomination: Church of Norway
- Churchmanship: Evangelical Lutheran

History
- Former name: Tysfjord kirke
- Status: Parish church
- Founded: 1601
- Consecrated: 1975

Architecture
- Functional status: Active
- Architect: Nils Toft
- Architectural type: Long church
- Completed: 1975 (51 years ago)

Specifications
- Capacity: 400
- Materials: Concrete

Administration
- Diocese: Sør-Hålogaland
- Deanery: Ofoten prosti
- Parish: Kjøpsvik
- Norwegian Cultural Heritage Site
- Type: Church
- Status: Not protected
- ID: 85697

Kjøpsvik Church (Norwegian: Kjøpsvik kirke) is a parish church of the Church of Norway in Narvik Municipality in Nordland county, Norway. It is located in the village of Kjøpsvik. It is the church for the Kjøpsvik parish which is part of the Ofoten prosti (deanery) in the Diocese of Sør-Hålogaland. The white, concrete church was built in a long church style in 1975 using plans drawn up by the architect Nils Toft. The church seats about 400 people.

== History ==
On 9 February 1601, a royal decree ordered the construction of the first church in Tysfjord. This church was built in Kjøpsvik later in 1601, about 500 metres (1,600 ft) southwest of the present church site, much closer to the shoreline. In 1791, the old church was taken down and moved to the nearby island of Hulløya. In 1839, the old church on Hulløya was taken down moved back to Kjøpsvik. In 1888, the old church was disassembled and moved to the village of Korsnes where it was rebuilt and it became known as Korsnes Church. A new church was built in Kjøpsvik to replace the old church that was taken down. The new church was constructed about 500 metres (1,600 ft) to the northeast of the old church site. By 1966, it was noted that old church was poorly maintained and it was difficult to heat during the winters, so a new building was seen as more economical that trying to fix up the old building. In 1975, the old church was torn down and a new church was built just to the west of the old church.

== Media gallery ==
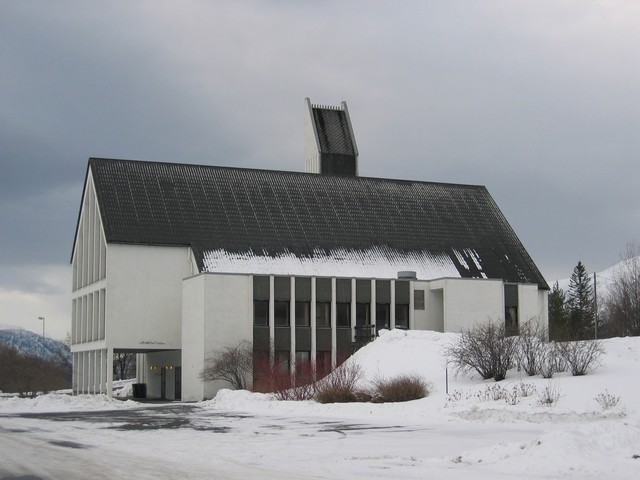

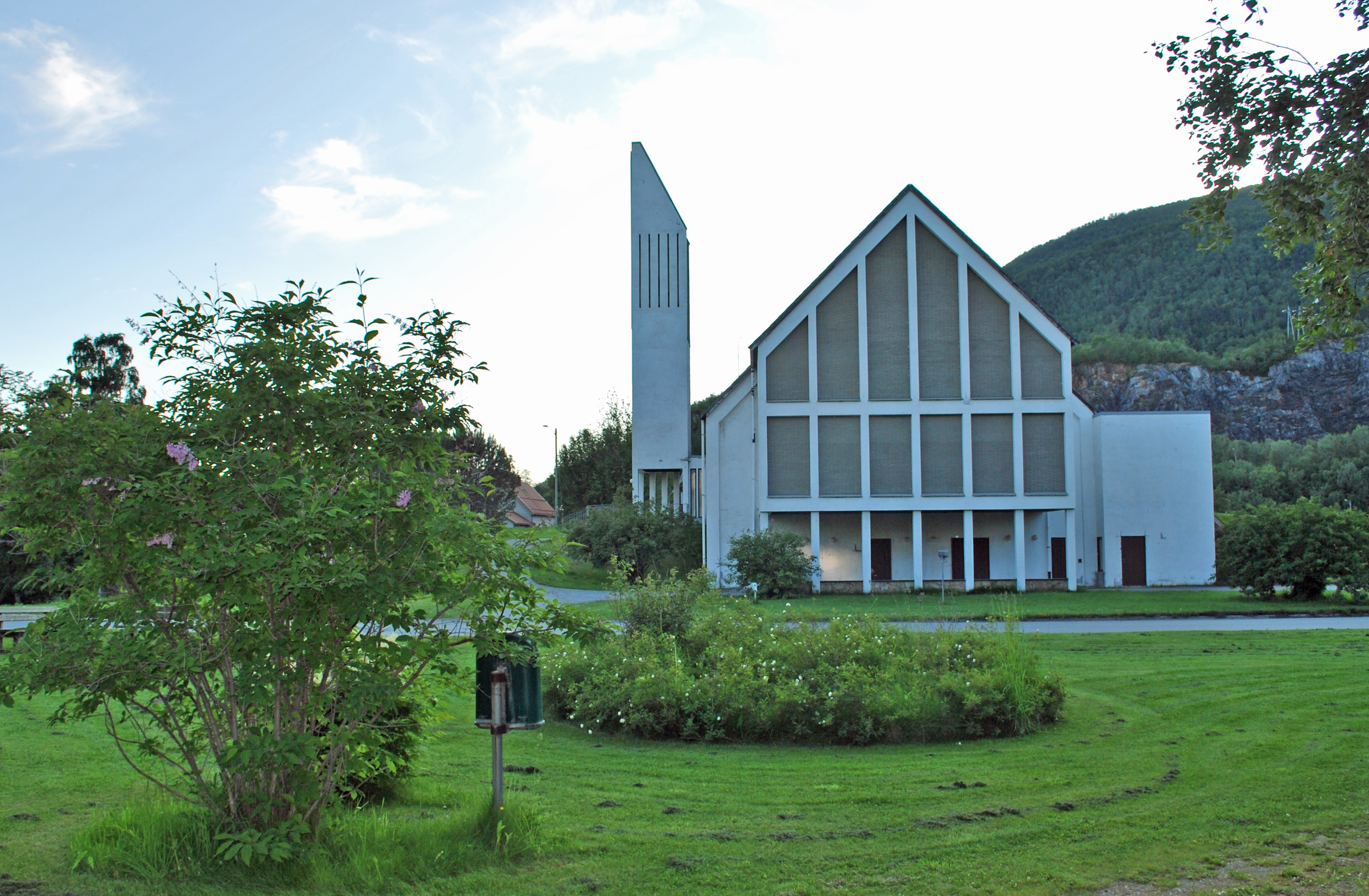

== See also ==
- List of churches in Sør-Hålogaland
