= Hellmobotn =

Village in Hamarøy Municipality, Norway

Hellmobotn: Hellmobotn (Norwegian); Vuodnabahta (Lule Sami)
- Village
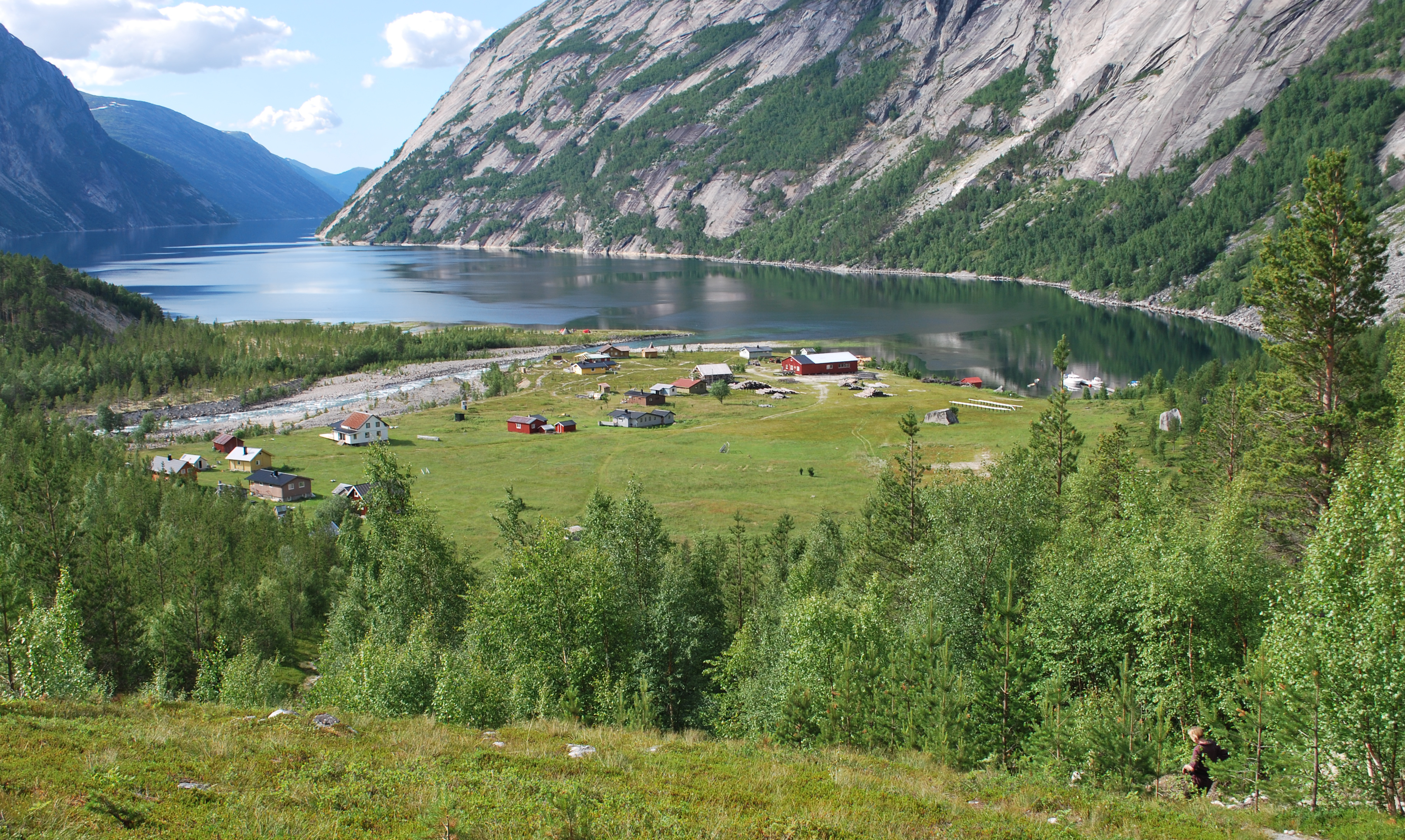
- View of the village
- Interactive map of Hellmobotn
- Location within Nordland Location within Norway
- Coordinates: 67.81406°N 16.51611°E
- Country: Norway
- Region: Northern Norway
- County: Nordland
- District: Salten
- Municipality: Hamarøy Municipality
- Elevation: 9 m (30 ft)
- Time zone: UTC+01:00 (CET)
  - Summer (DST): UTC+02:00 (CEST)
- Post Code: 8274 Musken

Hellmobotn (Norwegian) or Vuodnabahta (Lule Sami) is a village located in Hamarøy Municipality in Nordland county Norway. The Hellmofjorden is a fjord that runs through the valley, it is an arm off of main Tysfjorden. Hellmobotn is located at the narrowest part of Norway where the seawater in the fjord reaches to a point that is only about 6 kilometres (3.7 mi) from the national border with Sweden.

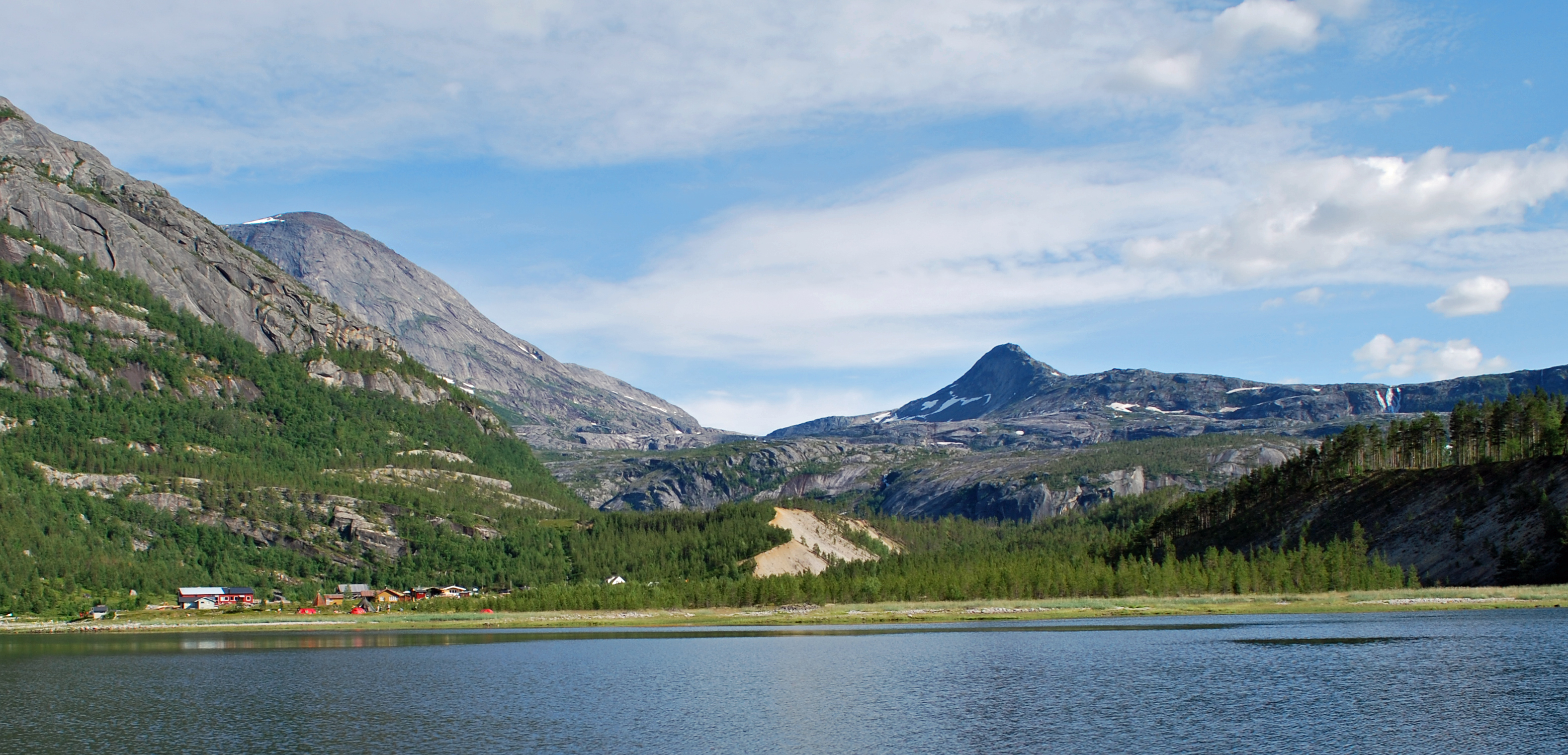
Hellmobotn seen from the fjord
Credit: Helge Høifødt

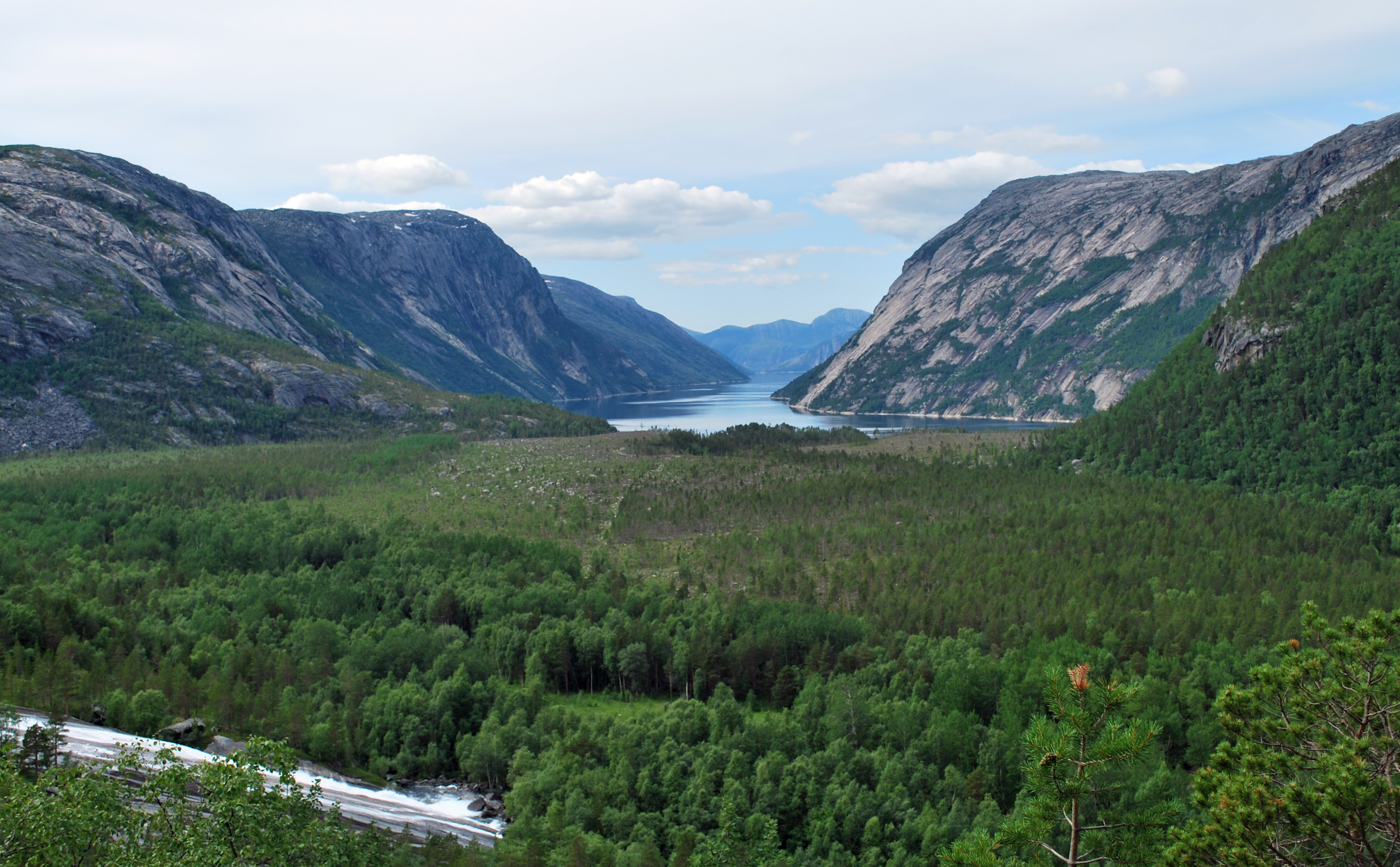
Hellmofjorden and the plateau within Hellmobotn
Credit: Helge Høifødt
