= Storå, Norway =

Village in Narvik Municipality, Norway

Storå (Norwegian) Jågåsijdda (Lule Sami) Historic: Jogasiida (Lule Sami)
- Village
- Interactive map of Storå (Norwegian); Jågåsijdda (Lule Sami)
- Location within Nordland Location within Norway
- Coordinates: 68.0728°N 16.3897°E
- Country: Norway
- Region: Northern Norway
- County: Nordland
- District: Ofoten
- Municipality: Narvik Municipality
- Elevation: 14 m (46 ft)
- Time zone: UTC+01:00 (CET)
  - Summer (DST): UTC+02:00 (CEST)
- Post Code: 8587 Storå

Storå (Norwegian) or Jågåsijdda (Lule Sami) is a village in Narvik Municipality in Nordland county, Norway. It is located about 3 kilometres (1.9 mi) south of the village of Kjøpsvik, on the opposite side of the Tysfjorden. The village population has decreased significantly in the last 20 years, so now there are only a few residents living in Storå. The local economy consists of agriculture and fishing. There are ferry connections from here to the villages of Kjøpsvik and Drag.
