= Northern Norway Line =

Proposed railway which would be built through Northern Norway

The Northern Norway Line (Norwegian: Nord-Norgebanen) is a proposed railway which would be built through Northern Norway. Several proposals have been launched: one is to connect from the Nordland Line at Fauske and continue onwards to Narvik, Tromsø, and Harstad. The Troms Line (Norwegian: Tromsbanen) is a more limited proposal that calls for a line between Narvik and Tromsø, but would not connect to the rest of the railway network in Norway and instead connect with the Swedish railway network via the Ofoten Line. During the Second World War, the German occupation forces started building the Polar Line between Fauske and Narvik, but the project was abandoned after the war.

== 2019 study ==
In 2019 the Norwegian Railway Directorate signed an agreement with Asplan Viak to study the development of a line from Fauske via Narvik to Tromsø. The Fauske – Tromsø Line would be around 375 kilometres (233 mi) long, while the Bjerkvik – Harstad line would be just over 80 kilometres (50 mi) long. The study has two suggested routes, one with a lot of tunnels, and one with fewer tunnels. The former has a 53-kilometre (33 mi) long tunnel and the latter 9 bridges over 1,000 metres (3,300 ft) length. Both have suspension bridges with over 1,000-metre (3,300 ft) span, near world record for railway bridges. The analyses found the full scheme development would cost 113 billion kr, while the line to Harstad would cost around 20 billion kr. The analysis showed that it would cost more than 100 billion kr ($US 11.6 billion). However, the Norwegian Railway Directorate says the line will not be economically viable, as calculations show a net loss for the state of between 46 billion kr and 109 billion kr.

== Proposed routes and details ==
There are both 1,520 mm (4 ft 11 27/32 in) and 1,435 mm (4 ft 8 1/2 in) lines being proposed.

=== 1520mm gauge routes ===
- Proposed routes: Kirkenes - Lakselv - Skibotn - Bjørnfjell - Fauske - Mo-i-Rana - Mosjøen - Levanger - Trondheim - Kongsvinger - Gothenburg, and Kolari - Skibotn - Tromsø
- Number of tracks: 1–2
- Electrification: 25kV 50 Hz AC overhead lines
- Minimum overhead wiring height: 6.7m above top of rails
- Minimum track center spacing: 4.7m
- Minimum passing loop length: 1500m
- Platform height: 200mm above top of rails

=== 1435mm gauge routes ===
- Proposed routes: Fauske - Bjørnfjell - Harstad
- Number of tracks: 1
- Electrification: 15kV 16 2/3Hz AC overhead lines
- Minimum overhead wiring height: 5.3m above top of rails
