= Korsnes Church =

- Korsnes kirke Hierenjárga girkko
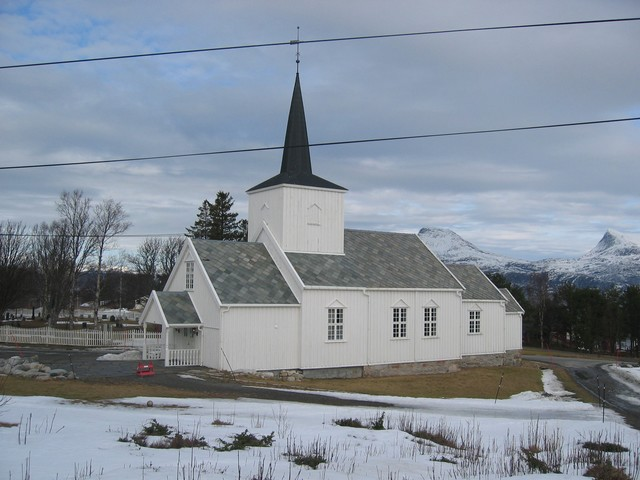
- View of the church
- Korsnes Church
- 68.25211139°N 16.05419093°E
- Location: Hamarøy Municipality, Nordland
- Country: Norway
- Denomination: Church of Norway
- Churchmanship: Evangelical Lutheran

History
- Status: Parish church
- Founded: 1888
- Consecrated: 6 May 1889

Architecture
- Functional status: Active
- Architect: Sigmund Brænne
- Architectural type: Long church
- Completed: 1888 (138 years ago)

Specifications
- Capacity: 80
- Materials: Wood

Administration
- Diocese: Sør-Hålogaland
- Deanery: Ofoten prosti
- Parish: Korsnes
- Norwegian Cultural Heritage Site
- Type: Church
- Status: Listed
- ID: 84831

Korsnes Church (Norwegian: Korsnes kirke or Northern Sami: Hierenjárga girkko) is a parish church of the Church of Norway in Hamarøy Municipality in Nordland county, Norway. It is located in the village of Korsnes. It is the church for the Korsnes parish which is part of the Ofoten prosti (deanery) in the Diocese of Sør-Hålogaland. The white, wooden church was built in a long church style in 1888 using plans drawn up by the architect Sigmund Brænne. The church seats about 80 people.

== History ==
The first church in Korsnes was built in 1888, but it was from reused materials. The materials were originally used in 1720 to build a chapel in Kjøpsnes (near where Kjøpsvik Church is now located). The chapel was later taken down and rebuilt on the island of Hulløya in 1791. In 1838, the building was moved back to Kjøpsnes where it was enlarged. In 1885, the parish decided to build a new Kjøpsvik Church. So in 1888, the church was taken down and moved to Korsnes where it was rebuilt as Korsnes Church. It was put into use in 1888, but it was not formally consecrated until 6 May 1889.

== Media gallery ==
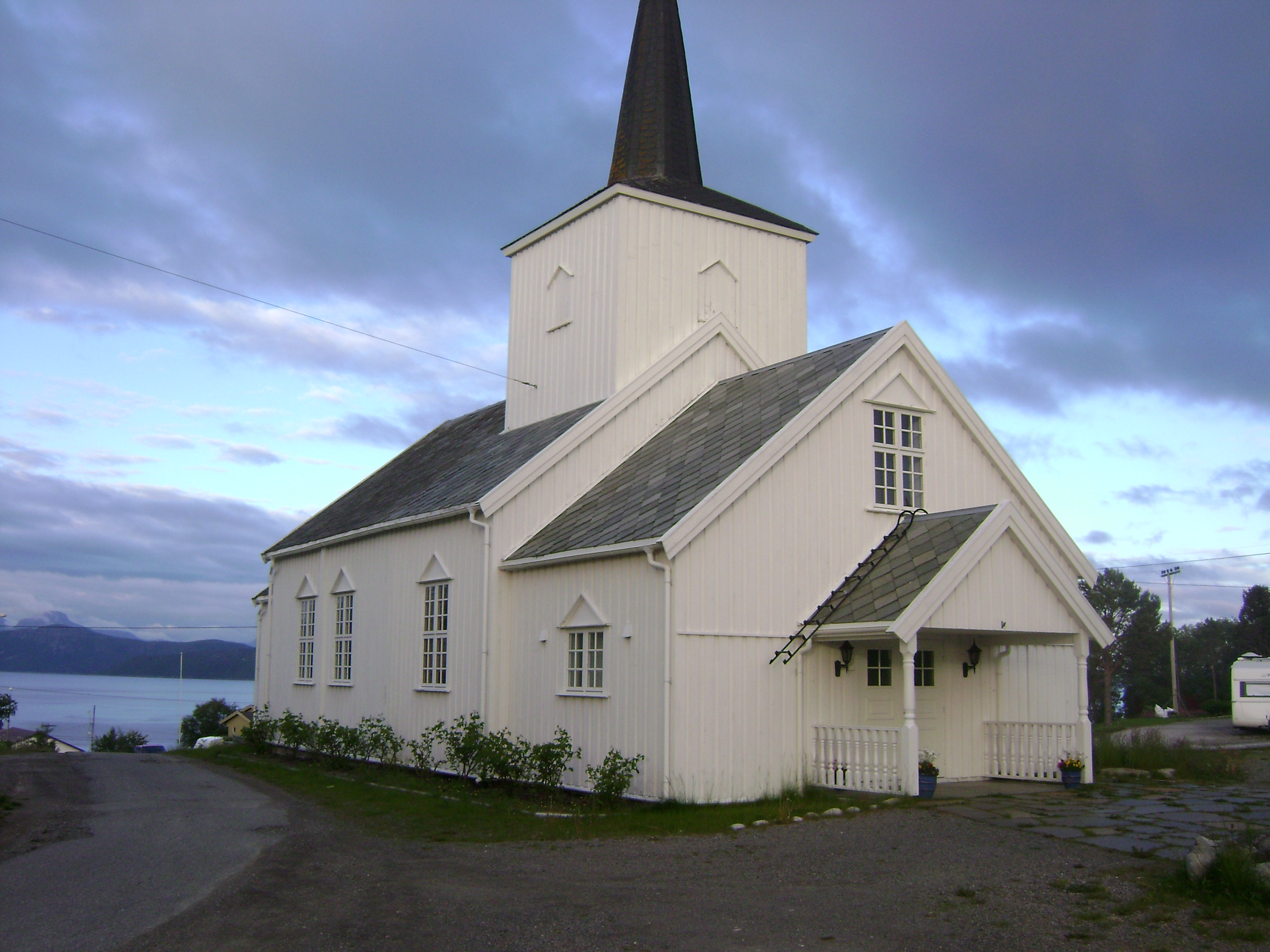

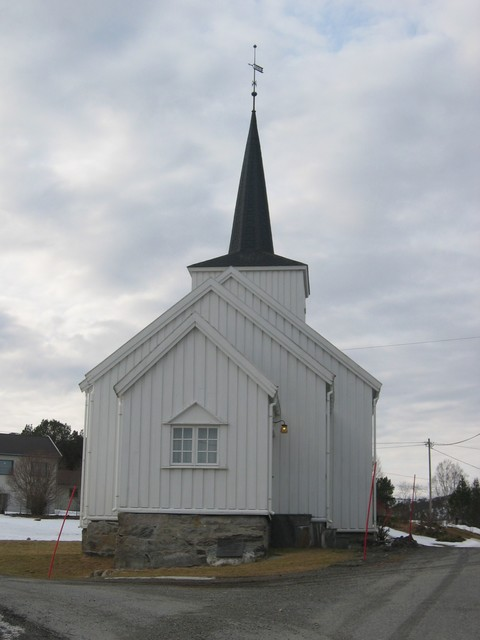

== See also ==
- List of churches in Sør-Hålogaland
