= Baugevatnet =

Lake in Nordland, Norway

- Interactive map of the lake
- Location: Nordland
- Coordinates: 68.0913°N 17.0148°E
- Basin countries: Norway
- Max. length: 8 kilometres (5.0 mi)
- Max. width: 900 metres (3,000 ft)
- Surface area: 4.99 km^{2} (1.93 sq mi)
- Shore length^{1}: 30.21 kilometres (18.77 mi)
- Surface elevation: 780 metres (2,560 ft)
- References: NVE
- ^{1} Shore length is not a well-defined measure.

Baugevatnet is a lake that lies in Narvik Municipality in Nordland county, Norway. The 4.99-square-kilometre (1.93 sq mi) lake is located about 25 kilometres (16 mi) east of the village of Kjøpsvik and just 1.5 kilometres (0.93 mi) northwest of the border with Sweden. The lake Båvrojávrre lies about 3 kilometres (1.9 mi) to the southwest and the lake Langvatnet lies about the same distance to the north.

== See also ==
- List of lakes in Norway
