= Trengsel Bridge =

Trengsel Bridge Trengsel bru
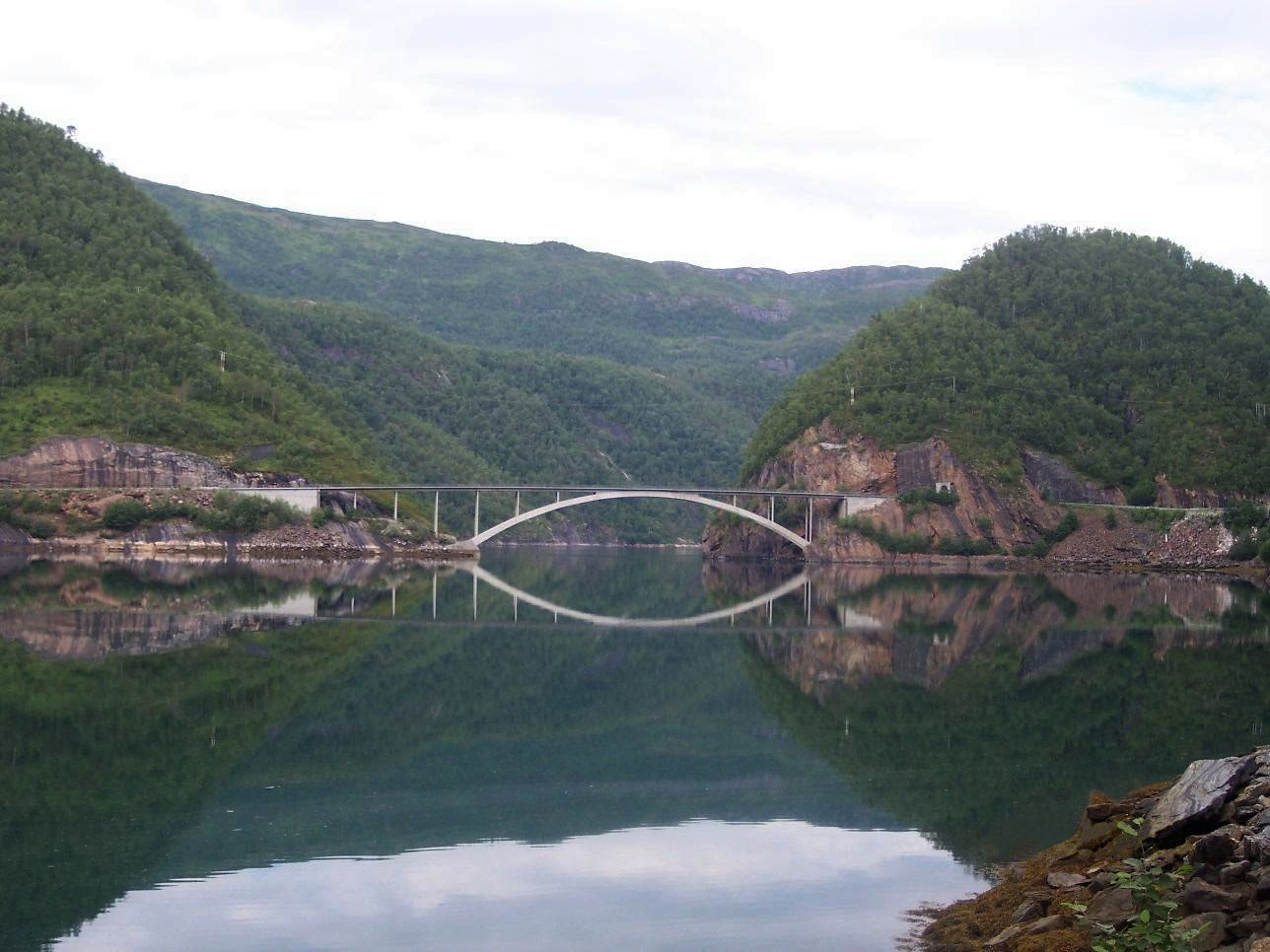
- View of the bridge
- Coordinates: 67°25′16″N 15°40′01″E
- Carries: E6
- Crosses: Trengselet
- Locale: Sørfold Municipality

Characteristics
- Total length: 179 metres (587 ft)

History
- Opened: 1966

The Trengsel Bridge (Norwegian: Trengsel bru) is a bridge that crosses the Trengselet strait in Sørfold Municipality in Nordland county, Norway. The 179-metre-long (587 ft) bridge is on the European route E6 highway between the towns of Fauske and Narvik. From the bridge, the beginning of an old railway tunnel for the Polar Line railway can be seen just to the north of the eastern end of the bridge. The tunnel was never completed.

== See also ==
- List of bridges in Norway
