= Kaldvågvatnet =

Lake in Nordland, Norway

- Kallvågvatnet
- Interactive map of the lake
- Location: Hamarøy Municipality, Nordland
- Coordinates: 68.0681°N 15.8289°E
- Basin countries: Norway
- Max. length: 2.8 kilometres (1.7 mi)
- Max. width: 1.6 kilometres (0.99 mi)
- Surface area: 2.14 km^{2} (0.83 sq mi)
- Shore length^{1}: 10.96 kilometres (6.81 mi)
- Surface elevation: 40 metres (130 ft)
- References: NVE
- ^{1} Shore length is not a well-defined measure.

Kaldvågvatnet is a lake in Hamarøy Municipality in Nordland county, Norway. It is located about 7 kilometres (4.3 mi) east of the municipal centre, Oppeid. The lake Skilvatnet lies immediately east of this lake.

== See also ==
- List of lakes in Norway
