= Skarberget =

Village in Narvik Municipality, Norway

Skarberget: Skarberget (Norwegian); Skárffabákte (Lule Sami)
- Village
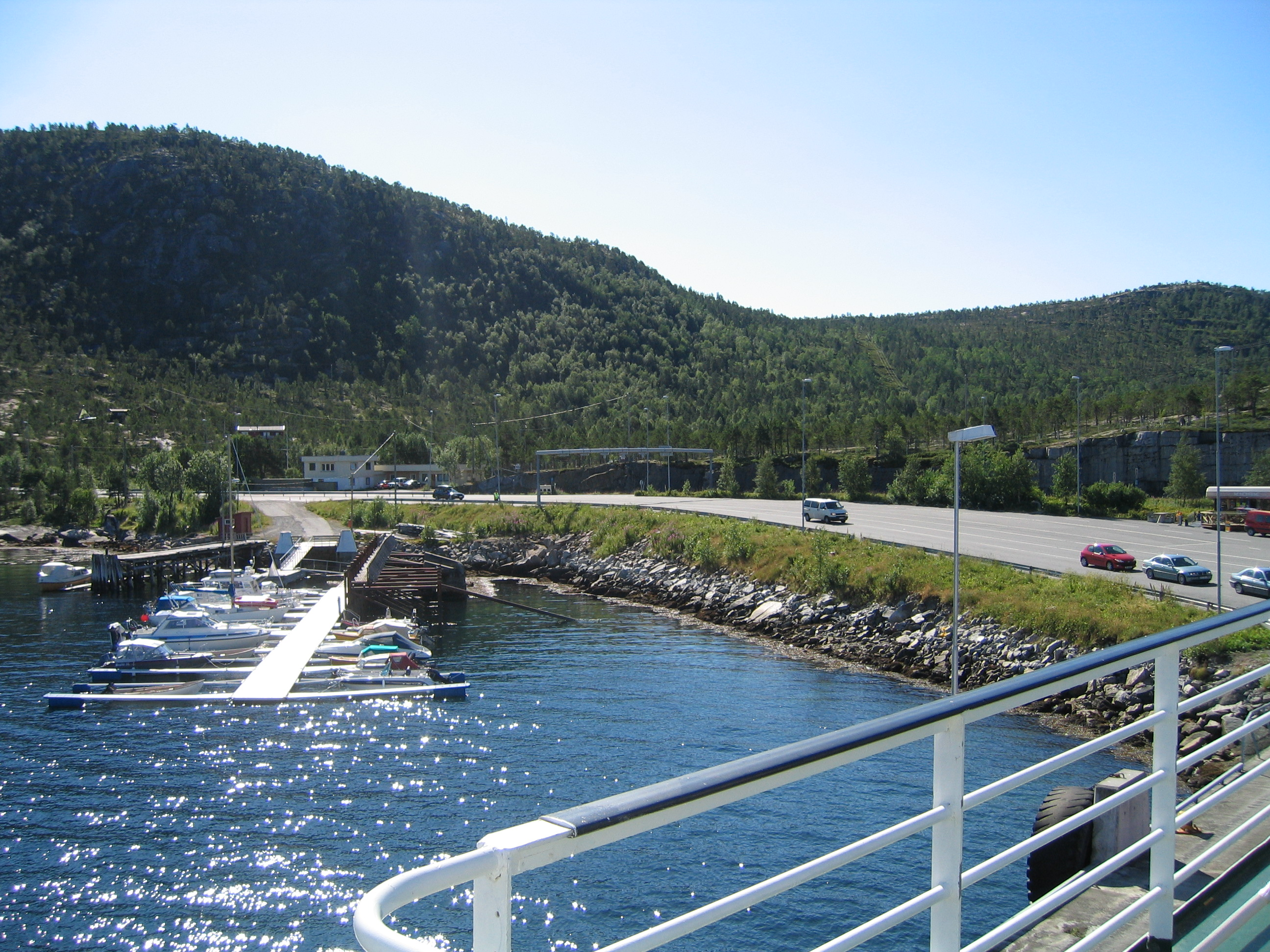
- View of the ferry quay at Skarberget
- Interactive map of Skarberget
- Location within Nordland Location within Norway
- Coordinates: 68.23239°N 16.23482°E
- Country: Norway
- Region: Northern Norway
- County: Nordland
- District: Ofoten
- Municipality: Narvik Municipality
- Elevation: 1 m (3.3 ft)
- Time zone: UTC+01:00 (CET)
  - Summer (DST): UTC+02:00 (CEST)
- Post Code: 8540 Ballangen

Skarberget (Norwegian) or Skárffabákte (Lule Sami) is a ferry port and small village area in Narvik Municipality in Nordland county, Norway. The village is located on the eastern side of the Tysfjorden. Ferries operate from Skarberget (in Narvik Municipality) across the Tysfjorden to Bognes (in Hamarøy Municipality) as part of the European route E6 highway.

Prior to 2020, this area was part of the old Tysfjord Municipality.
