= Árran =

Lule Sámi language and cultural center

Coordinates: 68.0500°N 16.0667°E

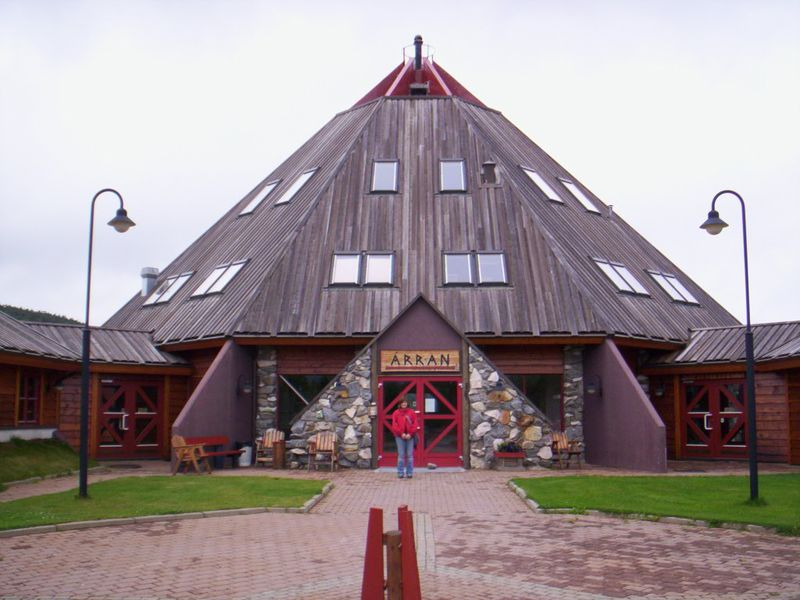
Arran

Árran is the Lule Sámi center in the village of Drag in Hamarøy Municipality in Nordland county, Norway. The center was established in 1994 to foster and promote the Lule Sámi language and culture. It does this by arranging on-site and video conference courses in Lule Sámi, publishing books, and doing research. The center has a museum, a souvenir shop, and a Lule Sámi day-care center on its premises. One of the major projects that it was involved with was the Lule Sámi on-line course Sámasta and soon it will be publishing a Norwegian–Lule Sámi dictionary.

Since 1999, Árran has published the popular scientific journal Bårjås, which is published in Lule Sámi and Norwegian/Swedish. The latter articles have summaries of the topic in Lule Sámi.

Director since 2011 is Lars Magne Andreassen. In 2017, the museum at Árran received a large archive by Mikal Urheim.
