= Tysfjorden =

Fjord in Nordland, Norway

Tysfjorden (Norwegian) Divtasvuodna (Lule Sami)
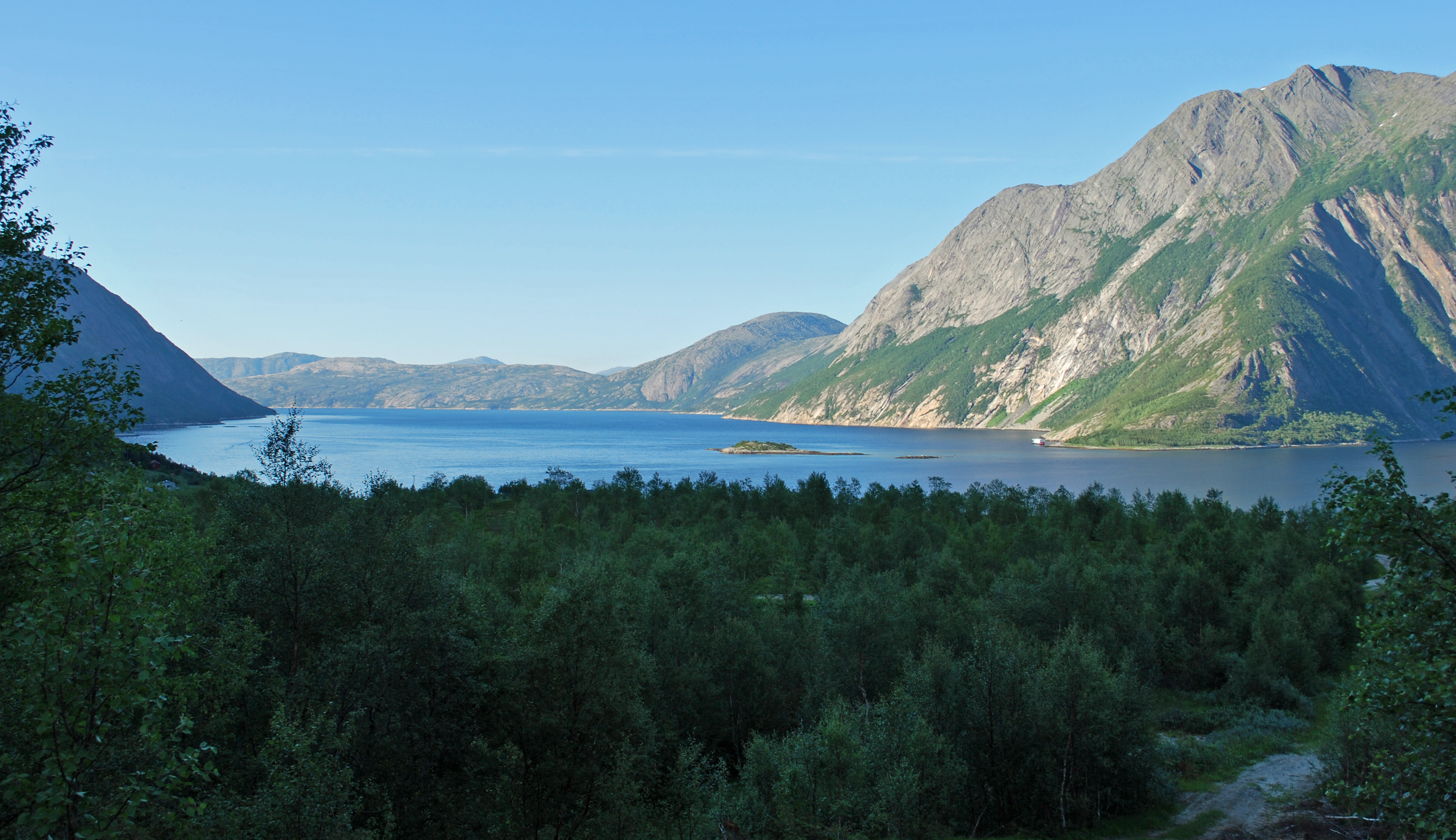
- View of the Tysfjorden from Musken
- Interactive map of the fjord
- Location: Nordland county, Norway
- Coordinates: 68.1851°N 16.1784°E
- Type: Fjord
- Basin countries: Norway
- Max. length: 62 kilometres (39 mi)
- Max. depth: 897 metres (2,943 ft)
- Islands: Hulløya
- Settlements: Bognes, Drag, Kjøpsvik, Musken, Storå, and Rørvika

Tysfjorden (Norwegian) or Divtasvuodna (Lule Sami) (also: English: Tys Fjord) is a fjord in Nordland county, Norway. The fjord is the border between Narvik Municipality and Hamarøy Municipality. The island of Hulløya is located about halfway through the fjord, right before the fjord splits in to several smaller branches. The Tysfjorden is the deepest fjord in Northern Norway reaching to 897 metres (2,943 ft) below sea level near Hulløya.

The 62-kilometre (39 mi) long fjord stretches southwards from the Ofotfjorden near the village of Korsnes all the way to the village of Hellmobotn, a point that is only about 6 kilometres (3.7 mi) from the border with Sweden. There is no bridge or tunnel crossing the fjord and there are no roads going around it either, so the ferry is the only way to travel past the fjord without going through Sweden. There are regular ferry crossings over the fjord go between Bognes and Skarberget (E6), and between Drag and Kjøpsvik (road 827).

== See also ==
- List of Norwegian fjords
