= Drag/Helland Church =

- Drag/Helland kirke Ájluovta ja Ájlátte girkko
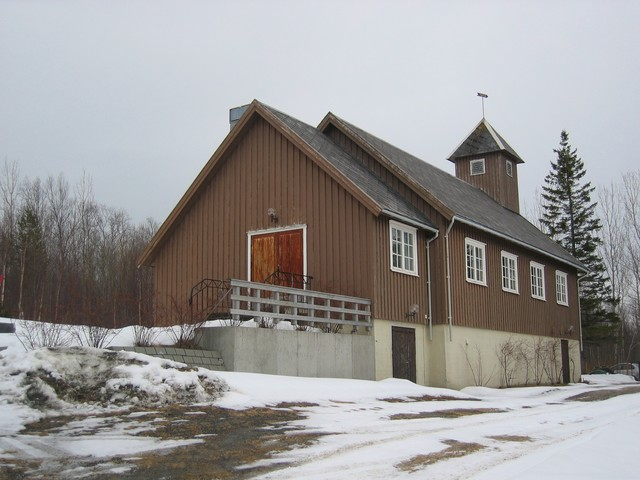
- View of the church
- Drag/Helland Church
- 68.0237564°N 16.1390259°E
- Location: Hamarøy Municipality, Nordland
- Country: Norway
- Denomination: Church of Norway
- Churchmanship: Evangelical Lutheran

History
- Status: Parish church
- Founded: 1972
- Consecrated: 1972

Architecture
- Functional status: Active
- Architect: Åge Iversen
- Architectural type: Long church
- Completed: 1972 (54 years ago)

Specifications
- Capacity: 100
- Materials: Wood

Administration
- Diocese: Sør-Hålogaland
- Deanery: Ofoten prosti
- Parish: Drag/Helland
- Norwegian Cultural Heritage Site
- Type: Church
- Status: Not protected
- ID: 84534

Drag/Helland Church (Norwegian: Drag/Helland kirke or Northern Sami: Ájluovta ja Ájlátte girkko) is a parish church of the Church of Norway in Hamarøy Municipality in Nordland county, Norway. It is located in the village of Drag. It is the church for the Drag/Helland parish which is part of the Ofoten prosti (deanery) in the Diocese of Sør-Hålogaland. The brown, wooden church was built in a long church style in 1972 using plans drawn up by the architect Åge Iversen. The church seats about 100 people.

== Media gallery ==
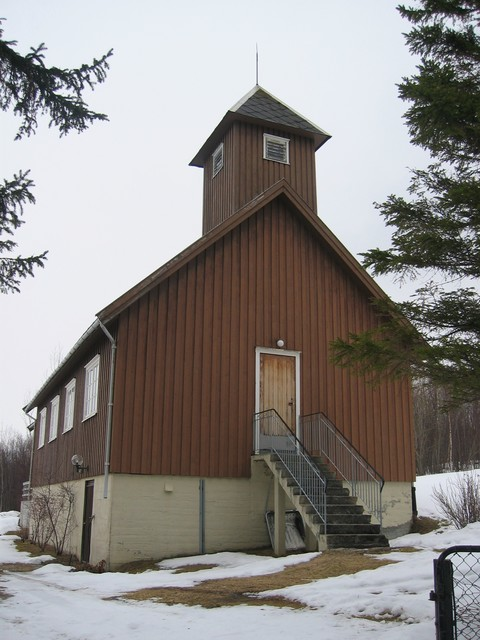

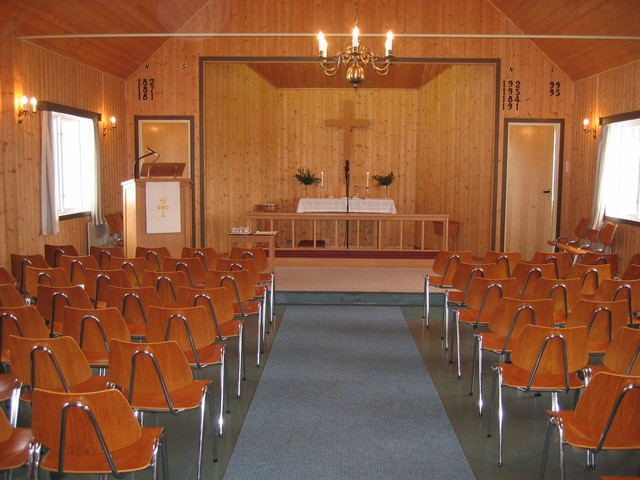

== See also ==
- List of churches in Sør-Hålogaland
