= Skilvatnet =

Lake in Nordland, Norway

Skilvatnet (Norwegian); Sjiellajávrre (Lule Sami)
- Interactive map of the lake
- Location: Hamarøy Municipality, Nordland
- Coordinates: 68.0639°N 15.8953°E
- Basin countries: Norway
- Max. length: 3 kilometres (1.9 mi)
- Max. width: 2 kilometres (1.2 mi)
- Surface area: 3.25 km^{2} (1.25 sq mi)
- Shore length^{1}: 12.86 kilometres (7.99 mi)
- Surface elevation: 35 metres (115 ft)
- References: NVE
- ^{1} Shore length is not a well-defined measure.

Skilvatnet (Norwegian) or Sjiellajávrre (Lule Sami) is a lake in Hamarøy Municipality in Nordland county, Norway. The lake lies about 10 kilometres (6.2 mi) east of the municipal centre of Hamarøy, Oppeid. The lake Kaldvågvatnet lies just west of this lake.

== See also ==
- List of lakes in Norway
