= Kjøpsvik =

Village in Narvik Municipality, Norway

Kjøpsvik (Norwegian) Gásluokta (Lule Sami)
- Village
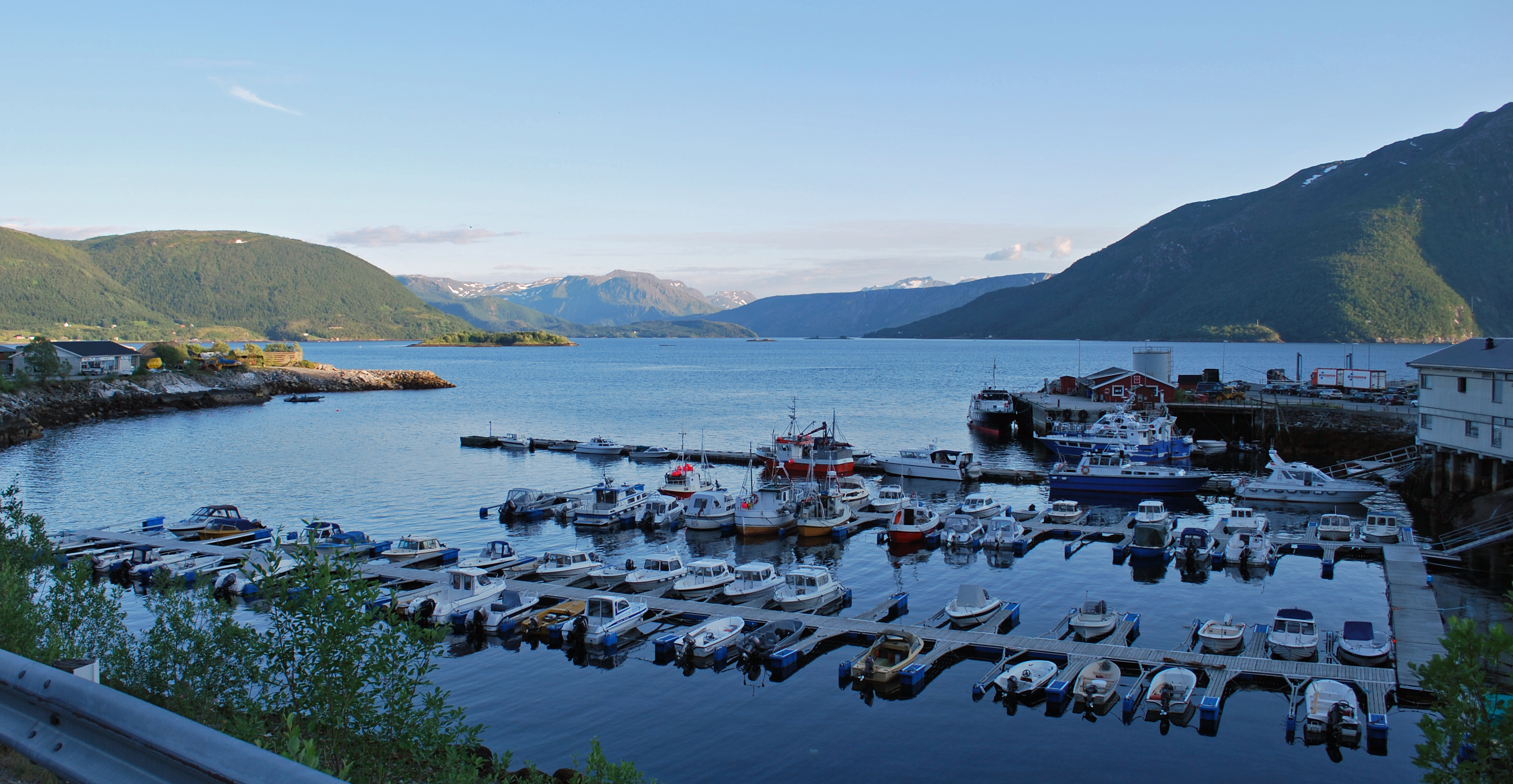
- View of the village harbour
- Interactive map of Kjøpsvik (Norwegian); Gásluokta (Lule Sami)
- Location within Nordland Location within Norway
- Coordinates: 68.0961°N 16.3737°E
- Country: Norway
- Region: Northern Norway
- County: Nordland
- District: Ofoten
- Municipality: Narvik Municipality

Area
  - Total: 0.97 km^{2} (0.37 sq mi)
- Elevation: 34 m (112 ft)

Population (2023)
  - Total: 780
  - Density: 804/km^{2} (2,080/sq mi)
- Time zone: UTC+01:00 (CET)
  - Summer (DST): UTC+02:00 (CEST)
- Post Code: 8590 Kjøpsvik
- Climate: Dfc

Kjøpsvik (Norwegian) or Gásluokta (Lule Sami) is a village in Narvik Municipality in Nordland county, Norway. The village is located on the eastern shore of the Tysfjorden, north of the small village of Storå. The island of Hulløya lies off the coast of Kjøpsvik. The 0.97-square-kilometre (240-acre) village has a population (2023) of 780 and a population density of 894 inhabitants per square kilometre (2,320/sq mi).

There are regular ferry connections as part of Norwegian National Road 827 from Kjøpsvik to the village of Drag, across the fjord. The local Kjøpsvik Church serves the residents of this area. The main industry in Kjøpsvik is the Norcem cement factory.

The village was the administrative centre of the old Tysfjord Municipality until 1 January 2020 when Tysfjord was dissolved.

== Media gallery ==
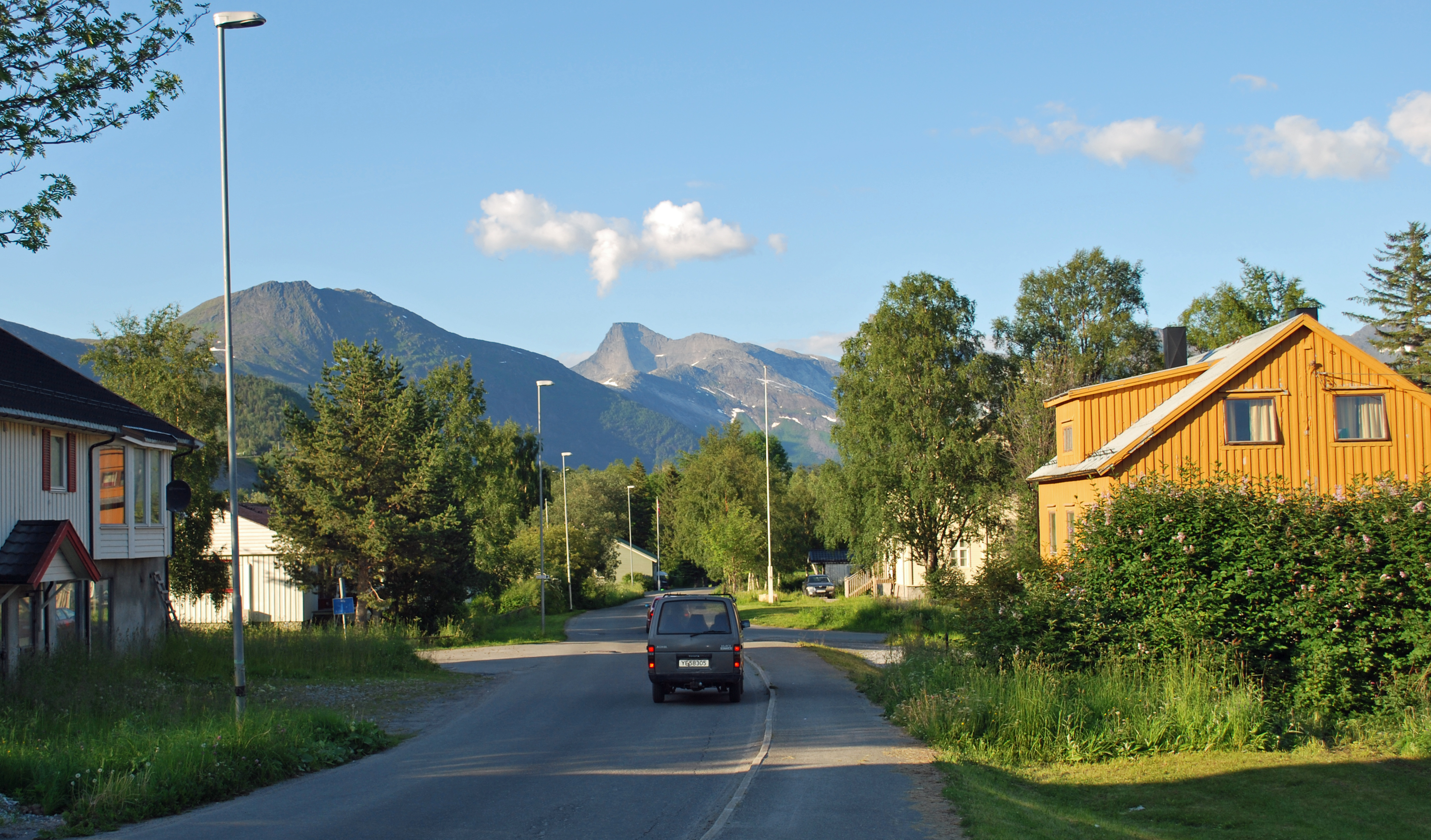
View of the main road in Kjøpsvik

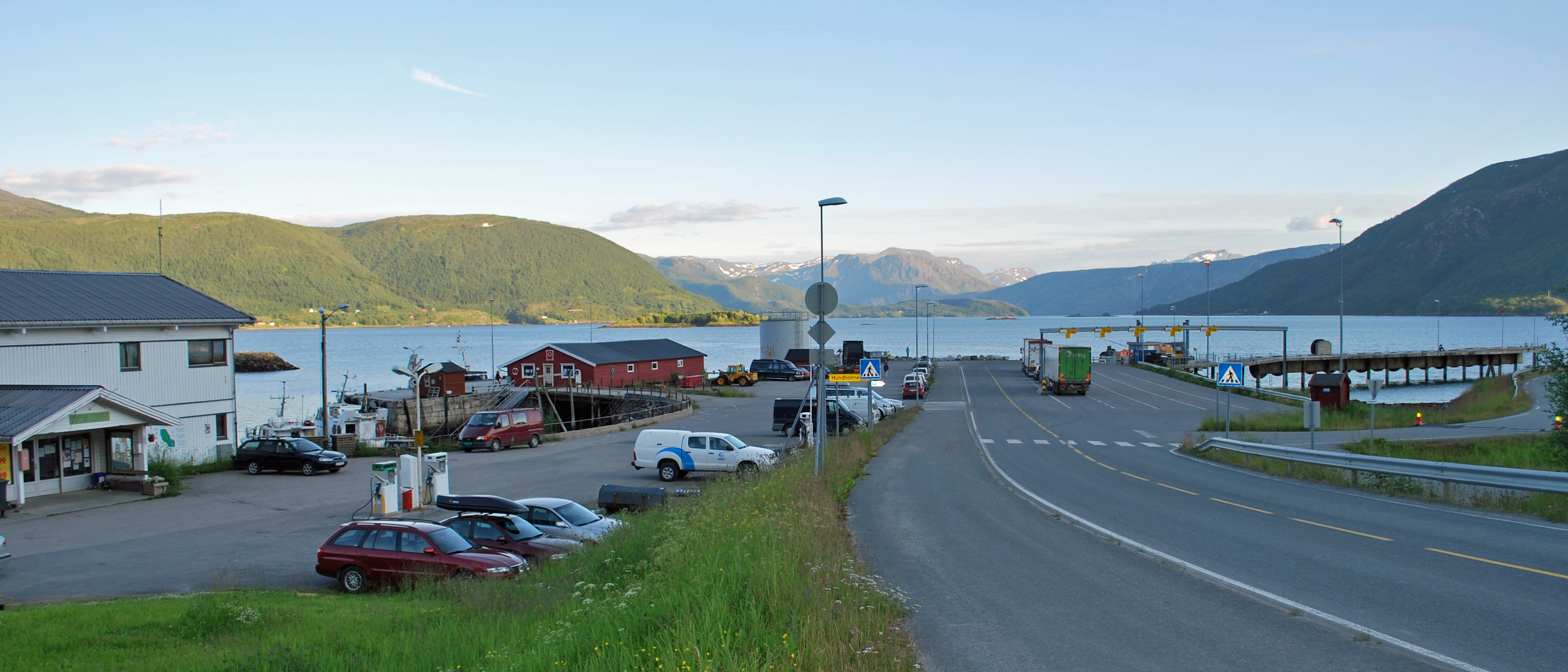
Kjøpsvik ferry port

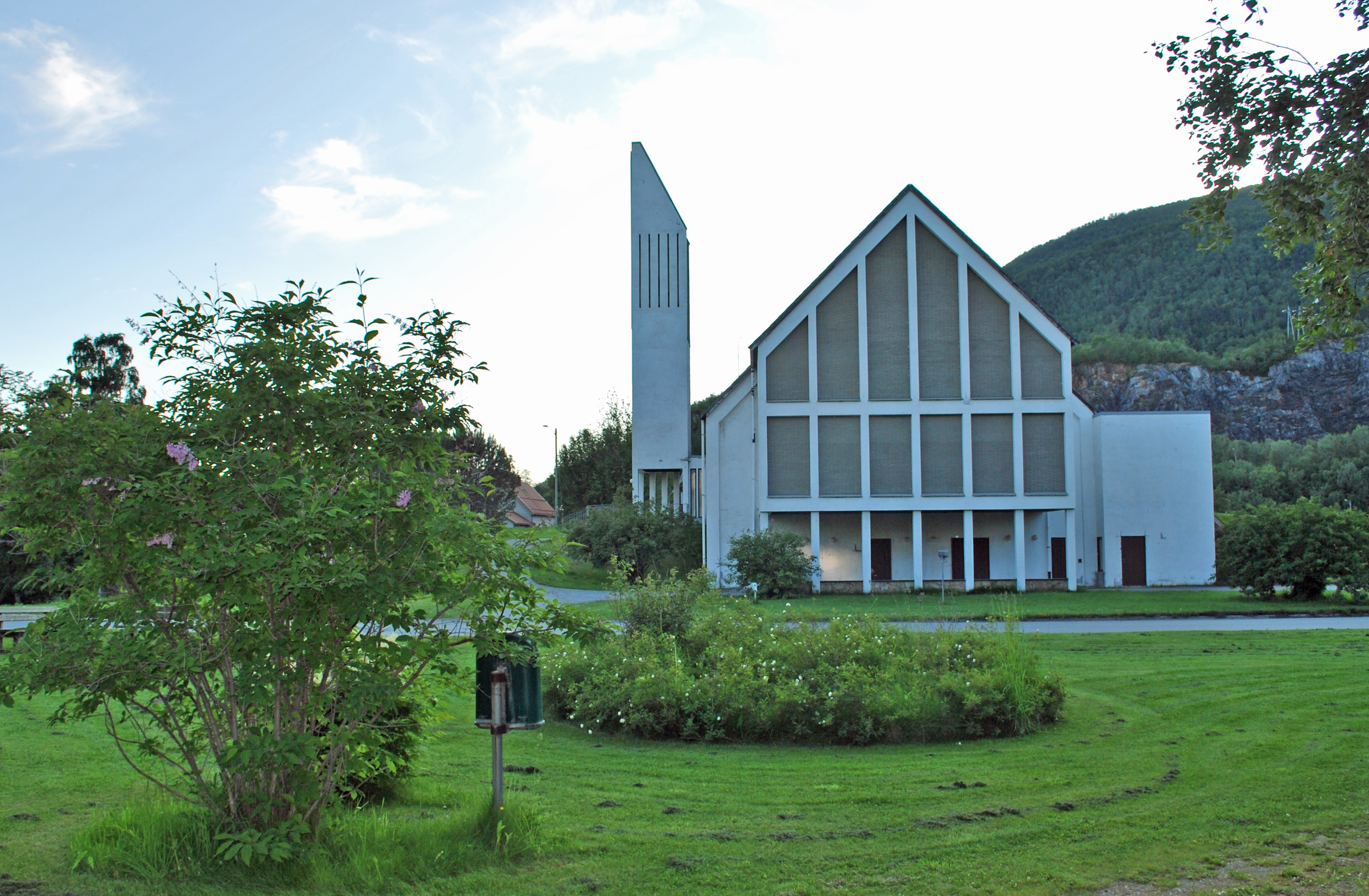
Kjøpsvik Church
