= Bognes =

Village in Hamarøy Municipality, Norway

Bognes: Bognes (Norwegian); Bognássje (Lule Sami)
- Ferry port
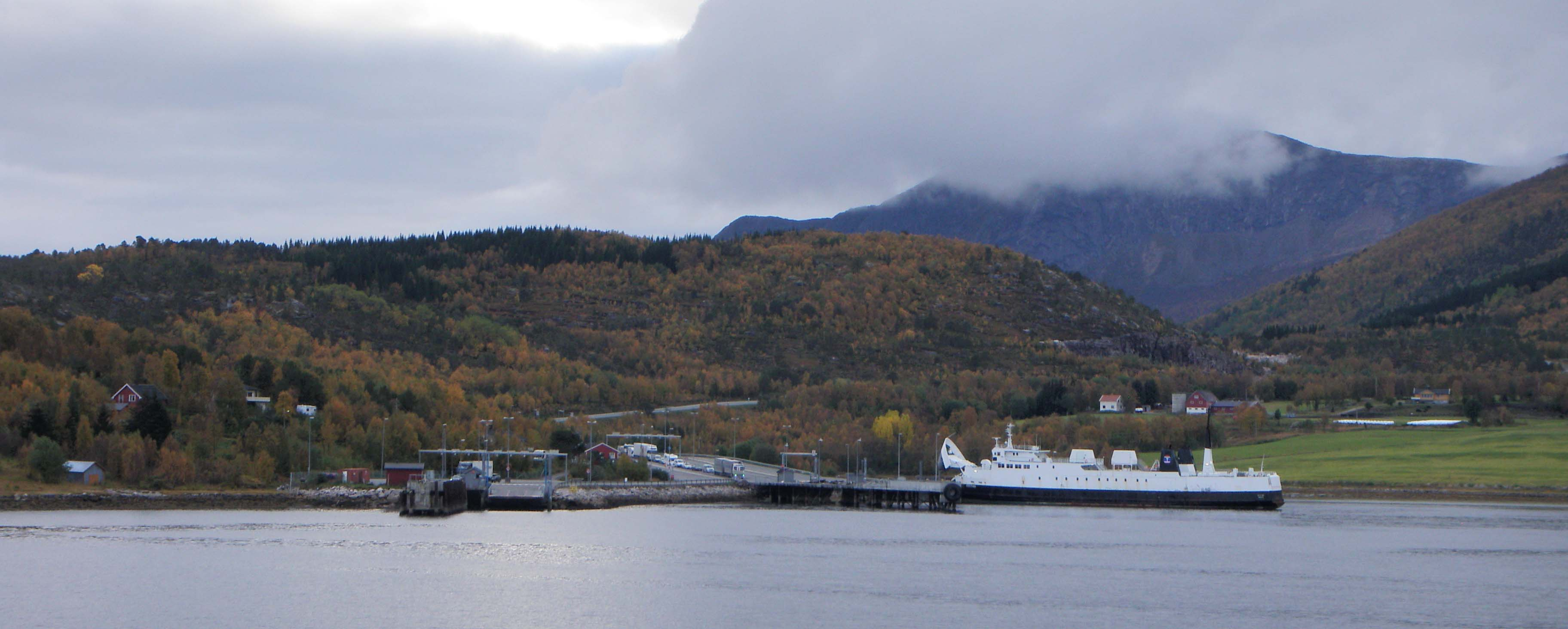
- Bognes ferry port
- Interactive map of Bognes
- Location within Nordland Location within Norway
- Coordinates: 68.2249°N 16.0758°E
- Country: Norway
- Region: Northern Norway
- County: Nordland
- District: Salten
- Municipality: Hamarøy Municipality
- Elevation: 1 m (3.3 ft)
- Time zone: UTC+01:00 (CET)
  - Summer (DST): UTC+02:00 (CEST)
- Post Code: 8275 Storjord i Tysfjord

Bognes (Norwegian) or Bognássje (Lule Sami) is a ferry port in Hamarøy Municipality in Nordland county, Norway. It is located in the outer part of the Tysfjorden on the western side of the fjord. The port is located about 5 kilometres (3.1 mi) south of the village of Korsnes and about 15 kilometres (9.3 mi) north of the village of Rørvika.

Ferries operate from Bognes across the Tysfjorden to Skarberget as part of the European route E06 highway. There are also ferries that cross the Vestfjorden to Lødingen as part of the Norwegian National Road 85.
