= Båvrojávrre =

Lake on the Norway-Sweden border

Båvrojávrre (Lule Sami)
- Historic spelling: Bovrojávri (Lule Sami)
- Interactive map of the lake
- Location: Narvik Municipality, Nordland; Gällivare Municipality, Norrbotten
- Coordinates: 68.0440°N 16.9688°E
- Basin countries: Norway and Sweden
- Max. length: 8 kilometres (5.0 mi)
- Max. width: 1.5 kilometres (0.93 mi)
- Surface area: 6.08 km^{2} (2.35 sq mi) (5.47 km^{2} in Norway)
- Shore length^{1}: 25.33 kilometres (15.74 mi)
- Surface elevation: 686 metres (2,251 ft)
- References: NVE
- ^{1} Shore length is not a well-defined measure.

Båvrojávrre is a lake that lies on the border between Norway and Sweden. Most of the 6.08-square-kilometre (2.35 sq mi) lake lies in Norway in Narvik Municipality in Nordland county. Only 0.61 square kilometres (0.24 sq mi) of the lake lies in Sweden in Gällivare Municipality in Norrbotten County. The lake Baugevatnet lies just to the north. The ending -jávrre is the Lule Sami word for lake.

== See also ==
- List of lakes in Norway
- Geography of Norway
