= Rørvika =

Village in Hamarøy Municipality, Norway

Rørvika (Norwegian) Ráluokta (Lule Sami)
- Village
- Interactive map of Rørvika (Norwegian); Ráluokta (Lule Sami)
- Location within Nordland Location within Norway
- Coordinates: 68.1357°N 16.1141°E
- Country: Norway
- Region: Northern Norway
- County: Nordland
- District: Salten
- Municipality: Hamarøy Municipality
- Elevation: 10 m (33 ft)
- Time zone: UTC+01:00 (CET)
  - Summer (DST): UTC+02:00 (CEST)
- Post Code: 8273 Nevervik

Rørvika (Norwegian) or Ráluokta (Lule Sami) is a village in Hamarøy Municipality in Nordland county, Norway. The village is located on the western side of the Tysfjorden, about 14 kilometres (8.7 mi) south of Bognes. The lake Kilvatnet lies about 2.5 kilometres (1.6 mi) to the west of the village.
