= Hulløya =

Island in Nordland, Norway

Hulløya (Norwegian); Ulli (Lule Sami); Stuor-Vuollná (Lule Sami)
- Interactive map of: Hulløya (Norwegian); Ulli (Lule Sami); Stuor-Vuollná (Lule Sami)

Geography
- Location: Nordland, Norway
- Coordinates: 68.0636°N 16.1910°E
- Area: 22.1 km^{2} (8.5 sq mi)
- Length: 6.7 km (4.16 mi)
- Width: 6 km (3.7 mi)
- Coastline: 21 km (13 mi)
- Highest elevation: 675 m (2215 ft)
- Highest point: Veten

Administration
- Norway
- County: Nordland
- Municipality: Hamarøy Municipality

Demographics
- Population: 1 (2016)

Hulløya (Norwegian), Stuor-Vuollná (Lule Sami), or Ulli (Lule Sami) is an island in Hamarøy Municipality in Nordland county, Norway. The island is located in the Tysfjorden, southwest of the village of Kjøpsvik. The island has an area of 22.1 square kilometres (8.5 sq mi) and the highest point is the 675-metre (2,215 ft) tall Veten. Hulløya had one permanent resident in 2016.

An express boat service connects Kjøpsvik (on the mainland) with Hulløyhamn (on Hulløya) and other villages in the fjord several times per week.
