= Korsnes =

Village in Hamarøy Municipality, Norway

Korsnes Korsnes (Norwegian) Hierenjárgga (Lule Sami)
- Village
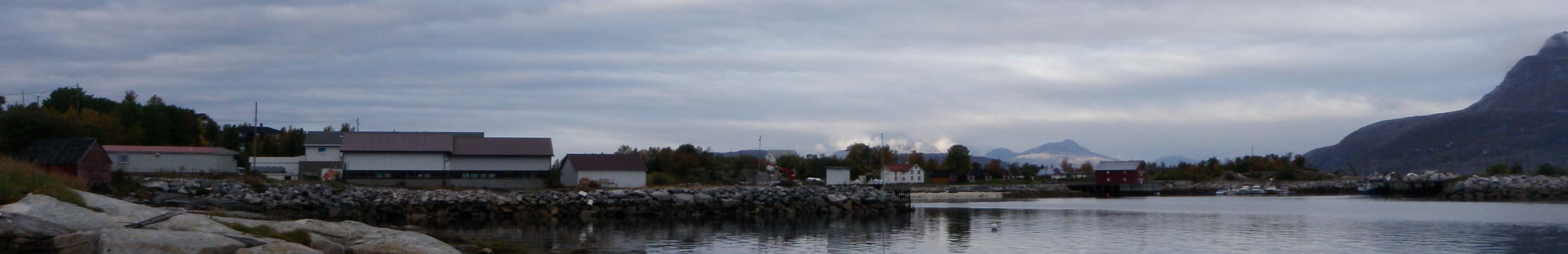
- View of the village
- Interactive map of Korsnes
- Location within Nordland Location within Norway
- Coordinates: 68.2520°N 16.0567°E
- Country: Norway
- Region: Northern Norway
- County: Nordland
- District: Salten
- Municipality: Hamarøy Municipality
- Elevation: 8 m (26 ft)
- Time zone: UTC+01:00 (CET)
  - Summer (DST): UTC+02:00 (CEST)
- Post Code: 8275 Storjord i Tysfjord

Korsnes (Norwegian) or Hierenjárgga (Lule Sami) is a village in Hamarøy Municipality in Nordland county, Norway. The village is located about 5 kilometres (3.1 mi) north of Bognes, along the western shore of the Tysfjorden. Korsnes Church is located in the village.

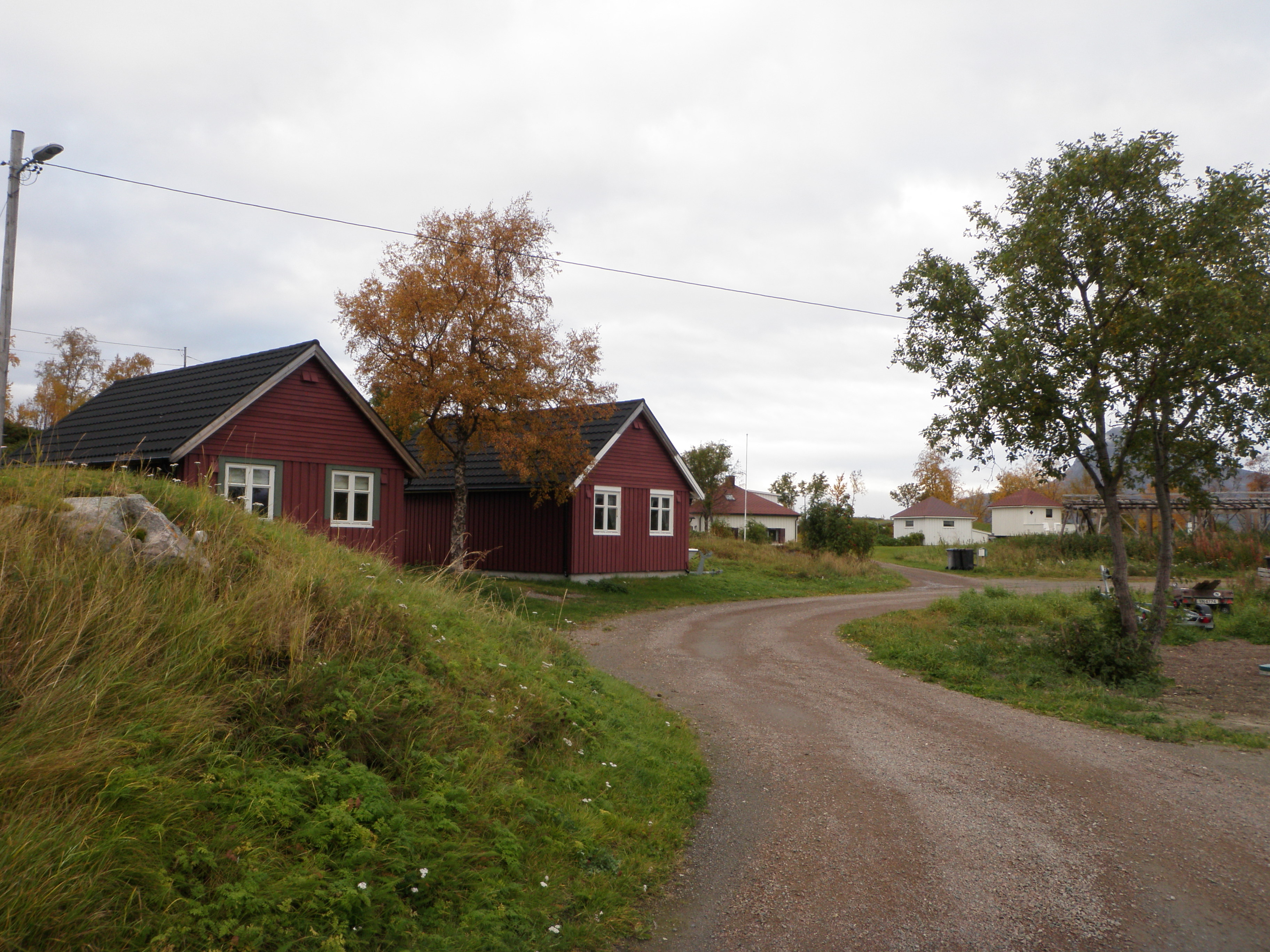
Street in Korsnes
