= Drag, Norway =

Village in Hamarøy Municipality, Norway

Drag Drag (Norwegian) Ájluokta (Lule Sami) Áiluokta (Northern Sami)
- Village
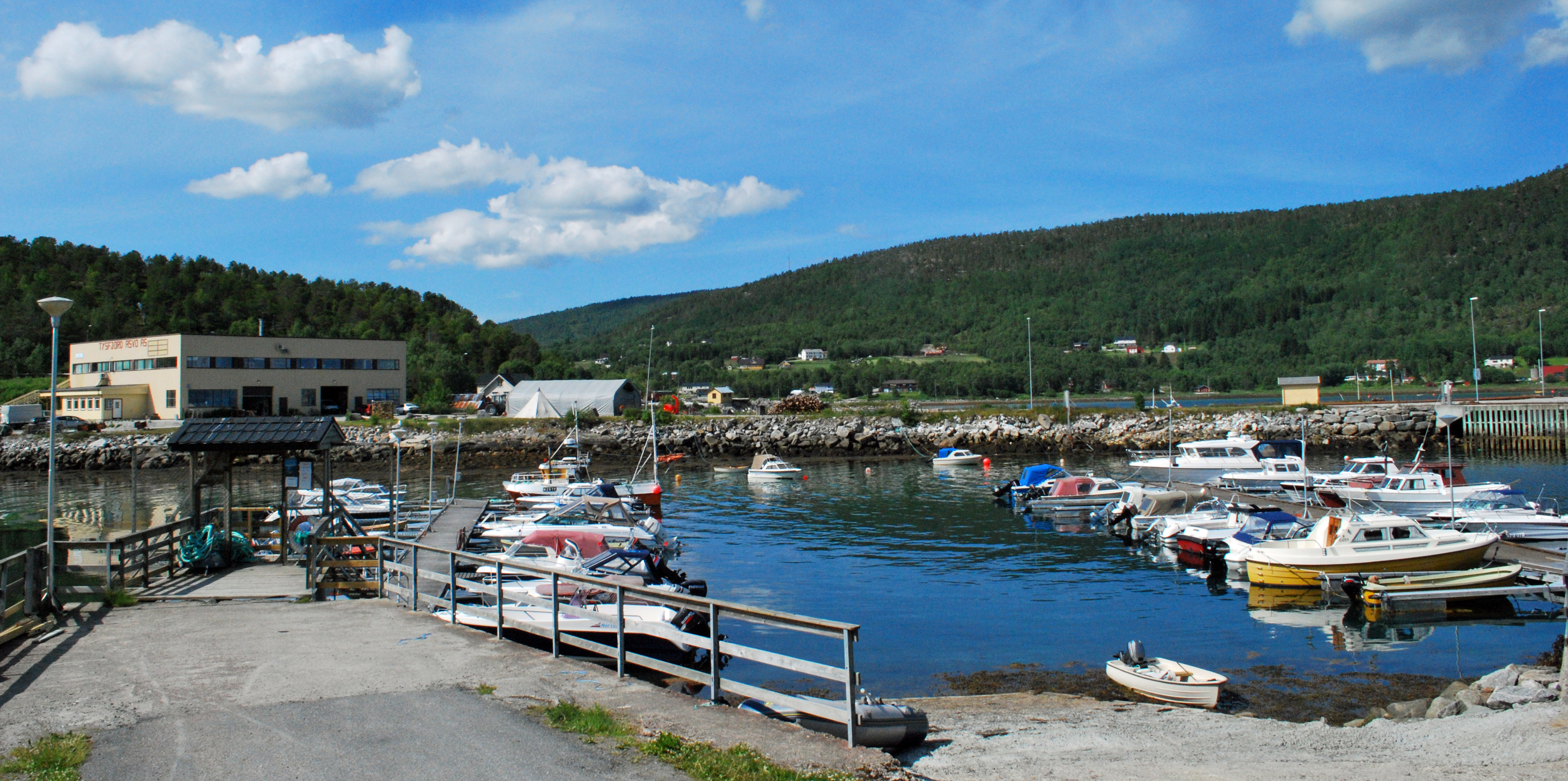
- View of the village harbor
- Interactive map of Drag
- Location within Nordland Location within Norway
- Coordinates: 68°02′40″N 16°04′47″E
- Country: Norway
- Region: Northern Norway
- County: Nordland
- District: Salten
- Municipality: Hamarøy Municipality

Area
  - Total: 0.45 km^{2} (0.17 sq mi)
- Elevation: 8 m (26 ft)

Population (2023)
  - Total: 305
  - Density: 678/km^{2} (1,760/sq mi)
- Time zone: UTC+01:00 (CET)
  - Summer (DST): UTC+02:00 (CEST)
- Post Code: 8270 Drag

Drag (Norwegian) or Ájluokta (Lule Sami) (or Northern Sami: Áiluokta) is a village in Hamarøy Municipality in Nordland county, Norway. It is located along the Tysfjorden, about 180 kilometres (110 mi) northeast of the town of Bodø and about 110 kilometres (68 mi) south of the town of Narvik. The 0.45-square-kilometre (110-acre) village has a population (2023) of 305 and a population density of 678 inhabitants per square kilometre (1,760/sq mi).

Drag is located along Norwegian National Road 827 which runs through Drag to a ferry port that connects to the village of Kjøpsvik across the fjord. Árran, the national Lule Sami Center is located in Drag. The Drag/Helland Church is located just outside the village of Drag.
