= Sluŋkajávrre =

Lake in Nordland, Norway

Sluŋkajávrre (Lule Sami)
- Interactive map of the lake
- Location: Hamarøy Municipality, Nordland
- Coordinates: 67.7819°N 16.1454°E
- Basin countries: Norway
- Max. length: 6.7 kilometres (4.2 mi)
- Max. width: 1.3 kilometres (0.81 mi)
- Surface area: 6.12 km^{2} (2.36 sq mi)
- Shore length^{1}: 17.11 kilometres (10.63 mi)
- Surface elevation: 561 metres (1,841 ft)
- References: NVE
- ^{1} Shore length is not a well-defined measure.

Sluŋkajávrre (Lule Sami) (or the historic spelling, Šluŋkkajávri) is a lake in Hamarøy Municipality in Nordland county, Norway. The lake lies about 20 kilometres (12 mi) southeast of the village of Tømmerneset. The large lake Rekvatnet lies just to the west of this lake. The ending -jávri or -jávrre is the Sami language word for lake.

== See also ==
- List of lakes in Norway
