= Rekvatnet =

Lake in Nordland, Norway

Rekvatnet (Norwegian) Goajvojávrre (Lule Sami)
- Aerial view of the lake
- Interactive map of the lake
- Location: Hamarøy Municipality, Nordland
- Coordinates: 67.8088°N 16.0817°E
- Basin countries: Norway
- Max. length: 4.8 kilometres (3.0 mi)
- Max. width: 3.5 kilometres (2.2 mi)
- Surface area: 7.41 km^{2} (2.86 sq mi)
- Shore length^{1}: 13.8 kilometres (8.6 mi)
- Surface elevation: 284 metres (932 ft)
- References: NVE
- ^{1} Shore length is not a well-defined measure.

Rekvatnet (Norwegian) or Goajvojávrre (Lule Sami) is a lake in Hamarøy Municipality in Nordland county, Norway. The lake lies about 15 kilometres (9.3 mi) southeast of the village of Tømmerneset. The lake Šluŋkkajávri lies just to the east of the lake. The water from Rekvatnet is piped downhill to a hydroelectric power station on the shores of the nearby lake Fjerdvatnet.

== See also ==
- List of lakes in Norway
