= Hamarøyskaftet =

Mountain in Nordland, Norway

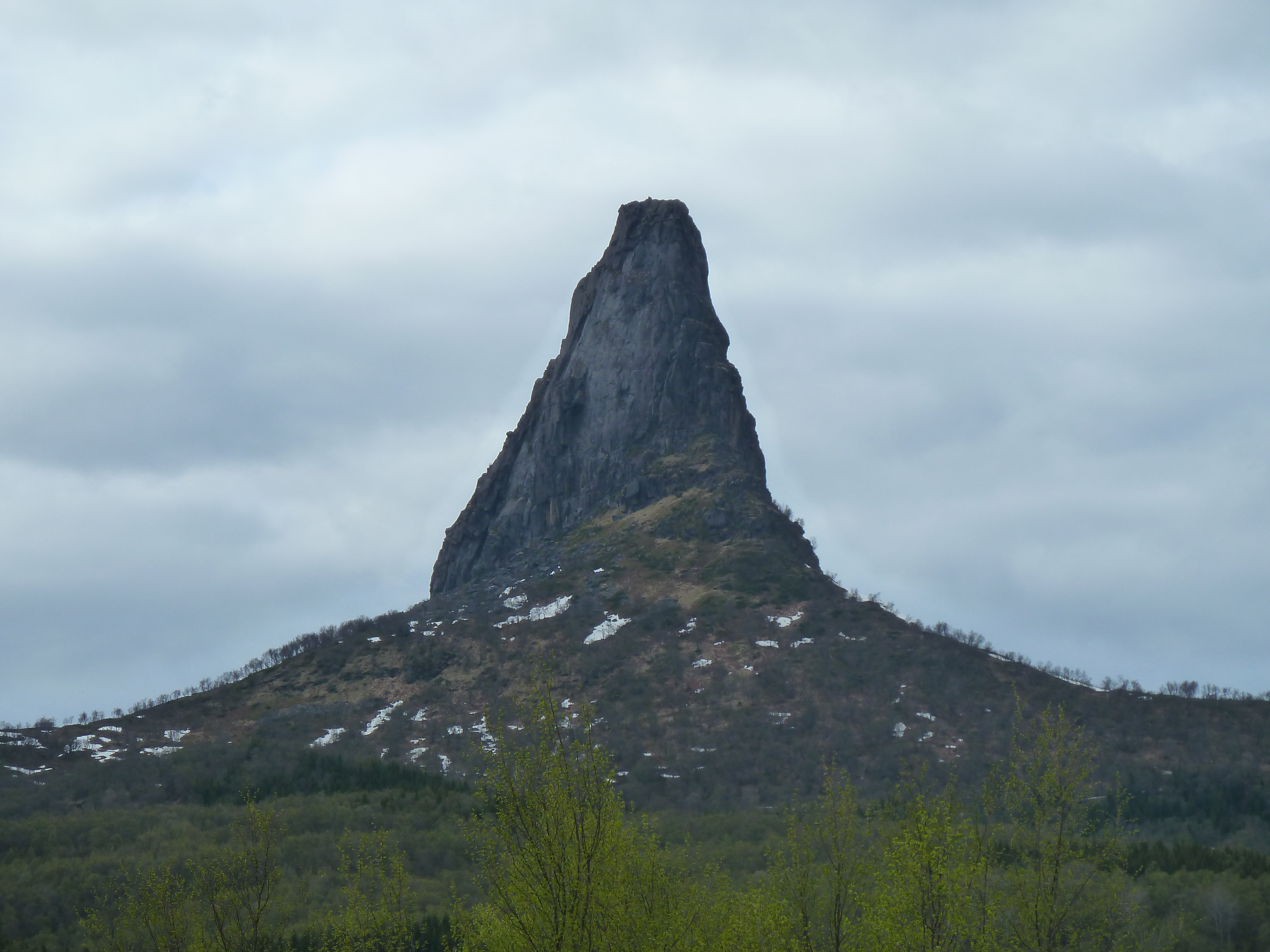

Highest point
- Elevation: 612 m (2,008 ft)
- Coordinates: 68.0806°N 15.4052°E

Geography
- Interactive map of the mountain
- Location: Nordland, Norway

Climbing
- First ascent: 1885: Martin Hoff Ekroll

Hamarøyskaftet is a mountain in Hamarøy Municipality in Nordland county, Norway. The 612-metre (2,008 ft) mountain is a characteristic landmark of the region. It is located about 10 kilometres (6.2 mi) west of the villages of Oppeid and Presteid and about 7 kilometres (4.3 mi) north of the village of Skutvika. The mountain was first ascended by Martin Hoff Ekroll in 1885.

The normal route to the peak is described as technically easy, with some exposed parts.

In 1998, Hamarøyskaftet was featured on a Norwegian postage stamp (NK 1333 with a value of 5.50 kr).
