= Skutvika =

Village in Hamarøy Municipality, Norway

Skutvika Skutvik
- Village
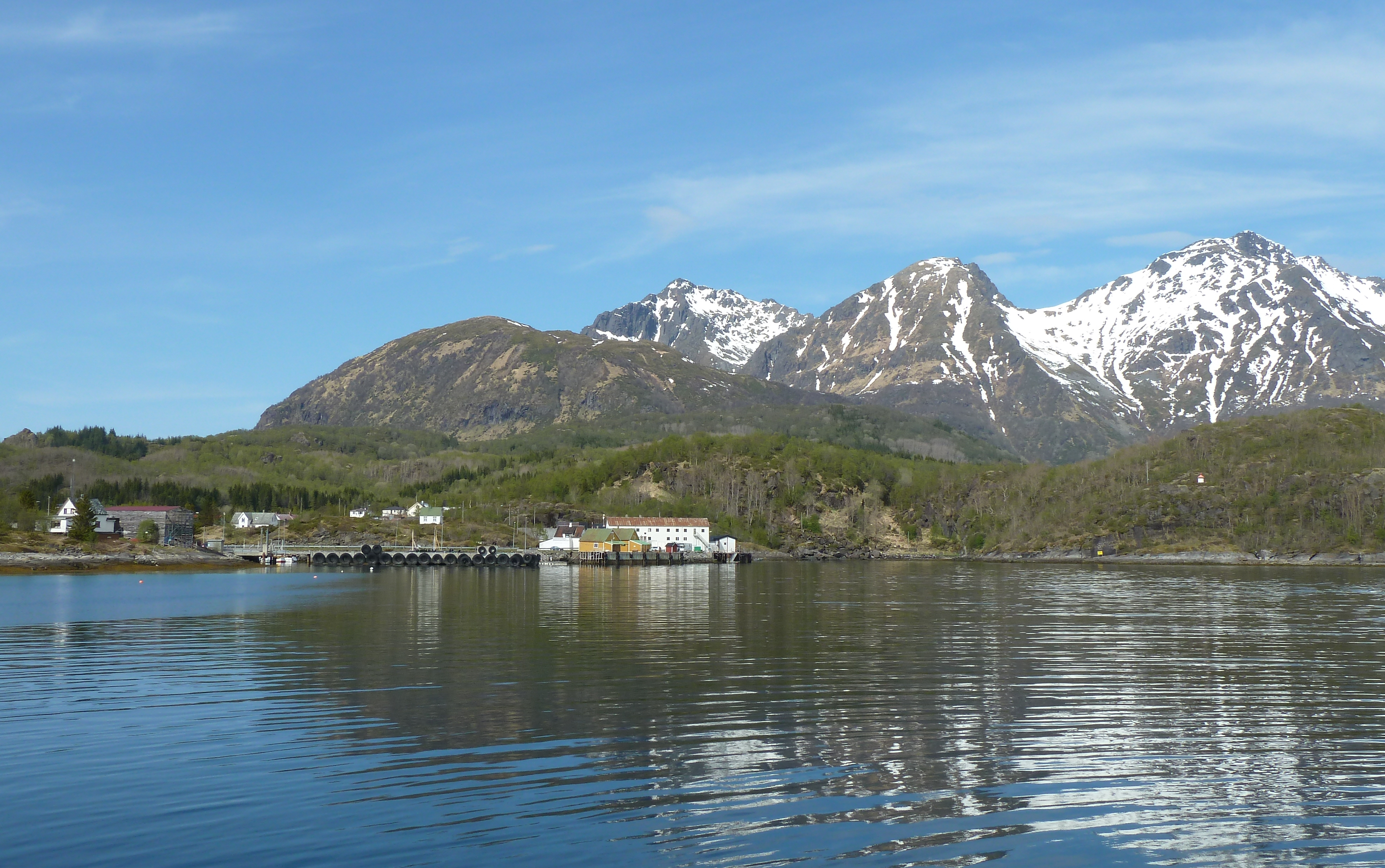
- View of the village, ferry port, and "Old-Skutvik"
- Interactive map of Skutvika
- Location within Nordland Location within Norway
- Coordinates: 68.0154°N 15.3319°E
- Country: Norway
- Region: Northern Norway
- County: Nordland
- District: Salten
- Municipality: Hamarøy Municipality
- Elevation: 5 m (16 ft)
- Time zone: UTC+01:00 (CET)
  - Summer (DST): UTC+02:00 (CEST)
- Post Code: 8290 Skutvik

Skutvika or Skutvik is a small village in Hamarøy Municipality in Nordland county, Norway. The village is situated at the southwestern extreme of the Hamarøya peninsula, about 90 kilometres (56 mi) north of the town of Bodø, 95 kilometres (59 mi) southwest of the town of Narvik, and 40 kilometres (25 mi) south of the town of Svolvær. To the west and south of Skutvik is the Økssundet, a sound connecting the Sagfjorden and Vestfjorden. The landscape in the immediate vicinity of the village is dominated by hills, while further north a row of mountains rises up to 950 metres (3,120 ft) above sea level.

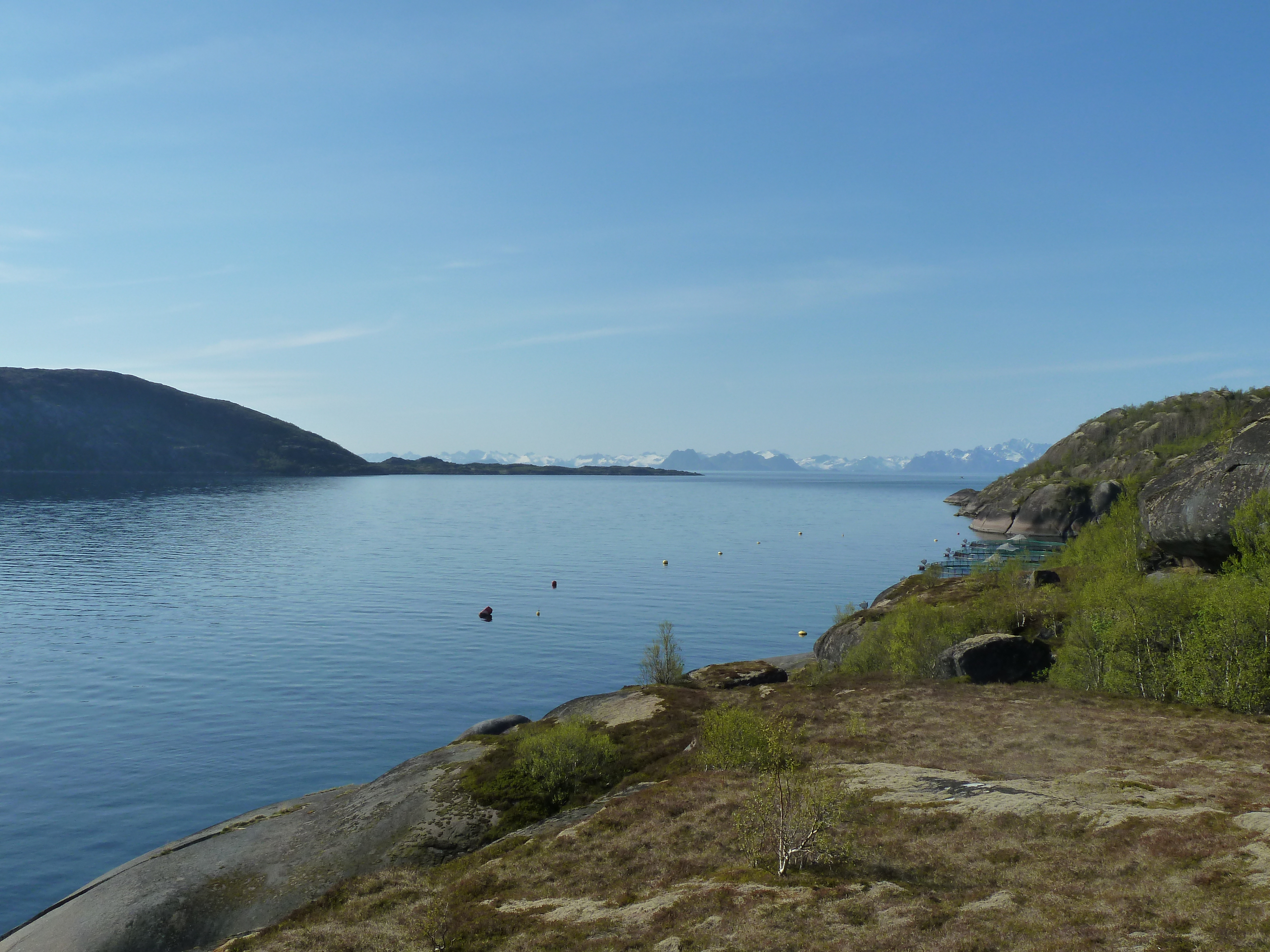
Økssundet merges with Vestfjord at Øksnesodden

The 0.27-square-kilometre (67-acre) village had a population (2000) of 201 and a population density of 744 inhabitants per square kilometre (1,930/sq mi). Since 2000, the population and area data for this village area has not been separately tracked by Statistics Norway. In 2007, there were 212 residents in the village. Skutvik has a grocery shop, cafeteria with accommodation, electronics business, school and kindergarten among other things. The main employer is Mainstream Norway with its salmon-processing plant. The name Skutvik(a) literally means "(the) ship cove".

== Transportation ==
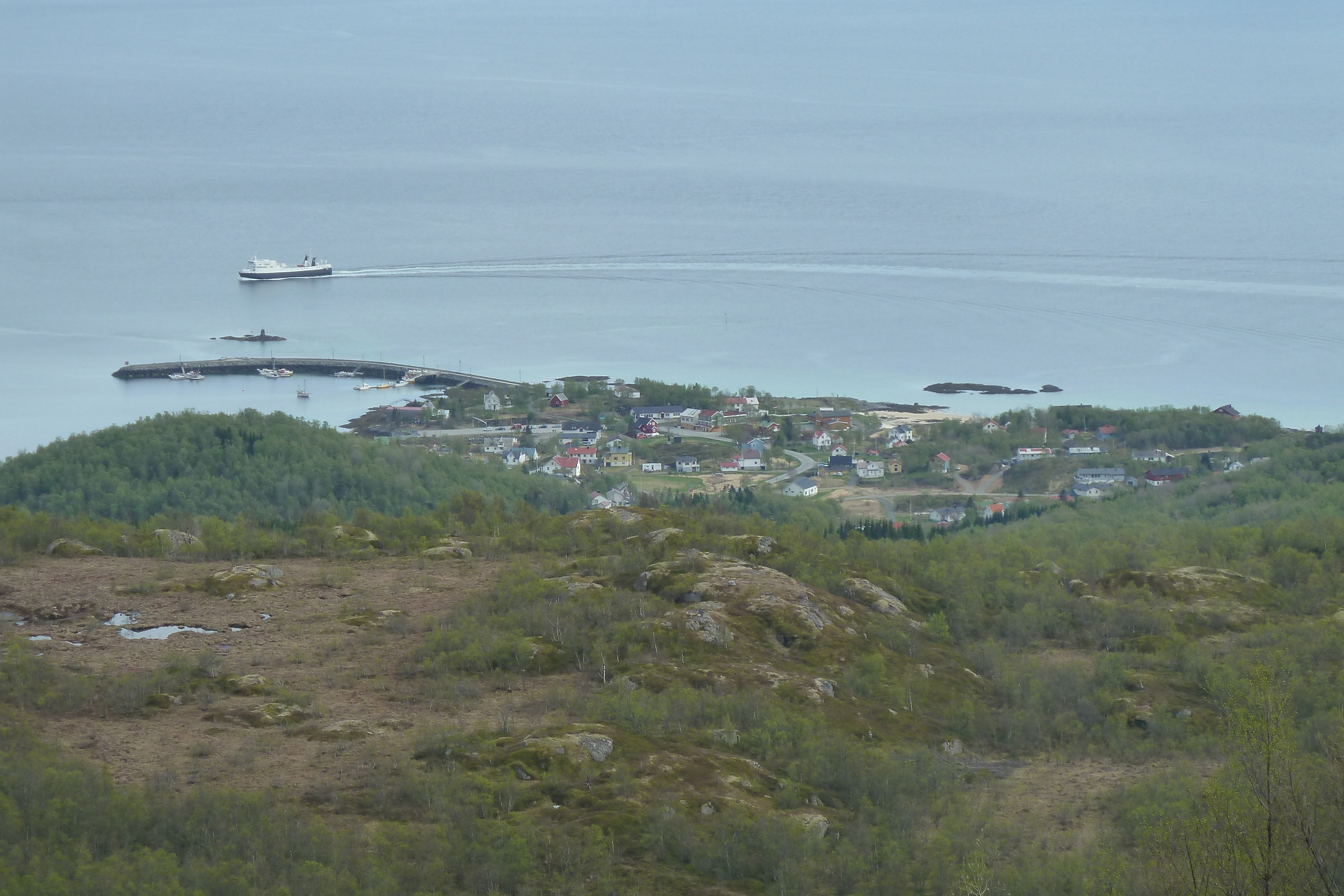
The ferry Vågan approaching Skutvik

- Norwegian County Road 81 starts in Skutvik and ends at the European route E6 highway in Ulvsvåg (total length of 35.9 kilometres or 22.3 miles).
- There are bus connections with Ulvsvåg, Oppeid and Skutvik are offered through Stoklands Bilruter, a division of Saltens Bilruter.
- There are daily departures of a car-ferry from Skutvik that connect to Svolvær and Skrova in Lofoten connecting County Road 81 to the European route E10 highway. There is increased ferry capacity and numbers of departures during the summer season (June–August).
- There is a high-speed passenger express boat running between the towns of Svolvær and Bodø that stops at Skutvik.

The two-hour ferry ride from Skutvik goes through a varied landscape, first between the mountains of Steigen and the Hamarøya peninsula, and then the crossing of the open ocean of the Vestfjorden, that on a clear day provides the view over the entire Lofoten mountain range. To call at the tiny island of Skrova, the ferry goes between islets and rocks.

== Tourist attractions ==
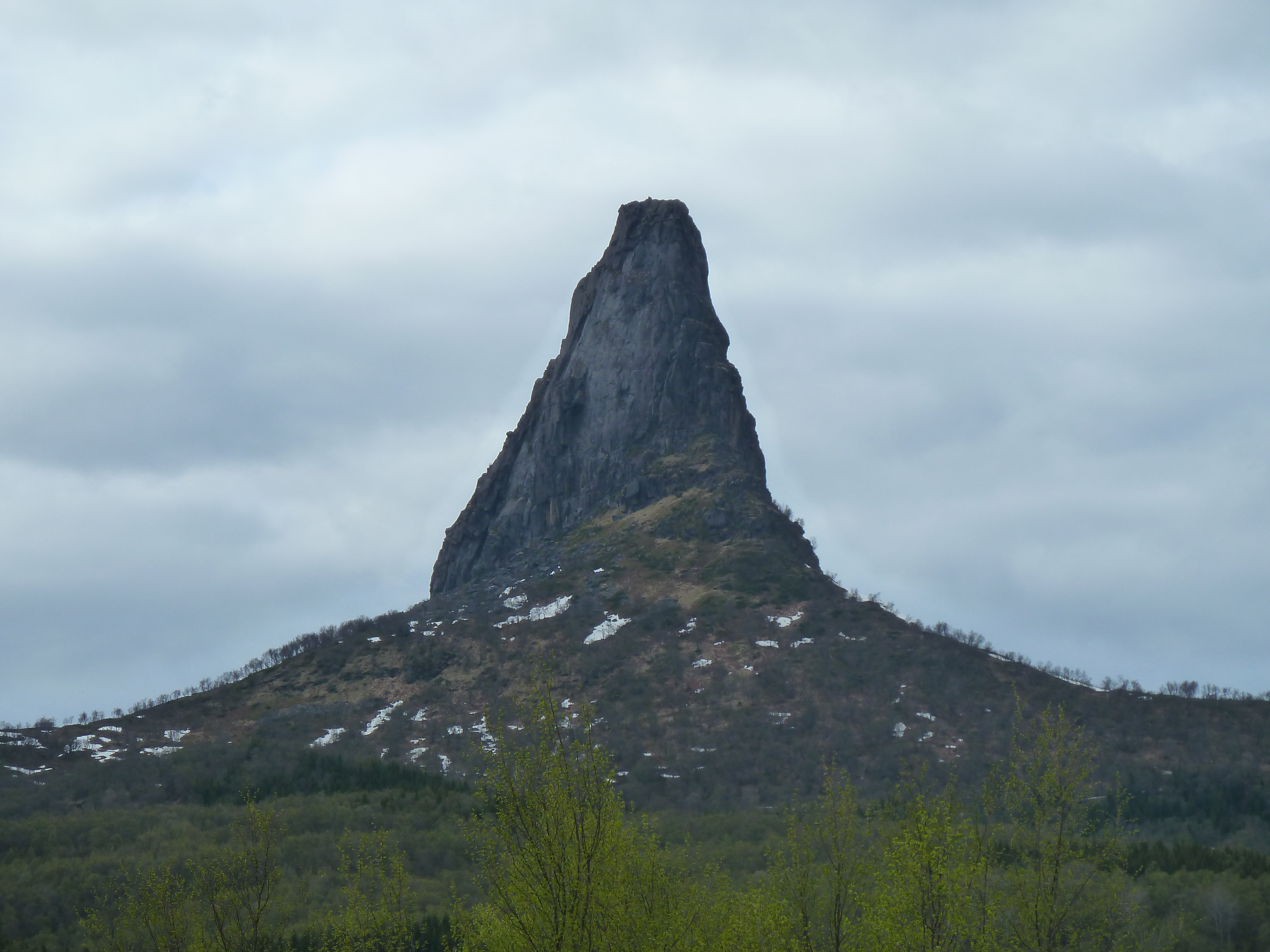
Hamarøyskaftet

- Hamarøyskaftet (The Hamarøy Mountain) is a peak which could be viewed from the county road about 7 to 8 kilometres (4.3 to 5.0 mi) from Skutvik, known for its special shape (almost vertical sides).
- Nesstraumen (The Ness Current), located outside Ness, 5 kilometres (3.1 mi) east of Skutvik, is one of the most powerful sea currents in Northern Europe with a maximum speed of up to 22 knots (41 km/h; 25 mph).
- Artscape Nordland: The sculpture "Stella Maris" by Steinar Christensen is located next to the beach towards Økssundet.

=== Accommodations ===
- Ness Camping is located in the tiny village Ness, 5 kilometres (3.1 mi) east of Skutvik
- Skutvik Fiskecamp (Fish Camp) is located next to the ferry port
- Skutvik Gjestegård (Guesthouse)
