= Kilvatnet =

Lake in Nordland, Norway

Kilvatnet (Norwegian) Ráhpukjávrre (Lule Sami)
- Interactive map of the lake
- Location: Hamarøy Municipality, Nordland
- Coordinates: 68.1293°N 16.0195°E
- Basin countries: Norway
- Max. length: 3.7 kilometres (2.3 mi)
- Max. width: 3.7 kilometres (2.3 mi)
- Surface area: 5.97 km^{2} (2.31 sq mi)
- Shore length^{1}: 32.52 kilometres (20.21 mi)
- Surface elevation: 94 metres (308 ft)
- References: NVE
- ^{1} Shore length is not a well-defined measure.

Kilvatnet (Norwegian) or Ráhpukjávrre (Lule Sami) is a lake in Hamarøy Municipality in Nordland county, Norway. The lake is located about 4 kilometres (2.5 mi) east of the village of Ulvsvåg.

== See also ==
- List of lakes of Norway
