= Nervatnet =

Nervatnet may refer to:

== Places ==
- Nervatnet (Fauske), a lake in Fauske Municipality in Nordland county, Norway
- Nervatnet, also known as Rotvatnet, a lake in Hamarøy Municipality in Nordland county, Norway
- Nervatnet (Narvik), a lake in Narvik Municipality in Nordland county, Norway
- Nervatnet, also known as Nedre Blokkvatnet, a lake in Sortland Municipality in Nordland county, Norway
- Nervatnet (Sørfold), a lake in Sørfold Municipality in Nordland county, Norway
- Nervatnet (Vågan), a lake in Vågan Municipality in Nordland county, Norway
