= Makkvatnet =

Lake in Nordland, Norway

Makkvatnet (Norwegian) Suoksavuomjávrre (Lule Sami)
- Interactive map of the lake
- Location: Steigen and Hamarøy, Nordland
- Coordinates: 67.8390°N 15.8250°E
- Basin countries: Norway
- Max. length: 2.8 kilometres (1.7 mi)
- Max. width: 1.6 kilometres (0.99 mi)
- Surface area: 3.02 km^{2} (1.17 sq mi)
- Shore length^{1}: 9.35 kilometres (5.81 mi)
- Surface elevation: 117 metres (384 ft)
- References: NVE
- ^{1} Shore length is not a well-defined measure.

Makkvatnet (Norwegian) or Suoksavuomjávrre (Lule Sami) is a lake that lies on the border of Steigen Municipality and Hamarøy Municipality in Nordland county, Norway. The 3.02-square-kilometre (1.17 sq mi) lake lies about 5 kilometres (3.1 mi) west of the European route E6 highway in Hamarøy.

== See also ==
- List of lakes in Norway
