= Reinoksvatnet =

Lake in Nordland, Norway

Reinoksvatnet (Norwegian) Hierggejávrre (Lule Sami)
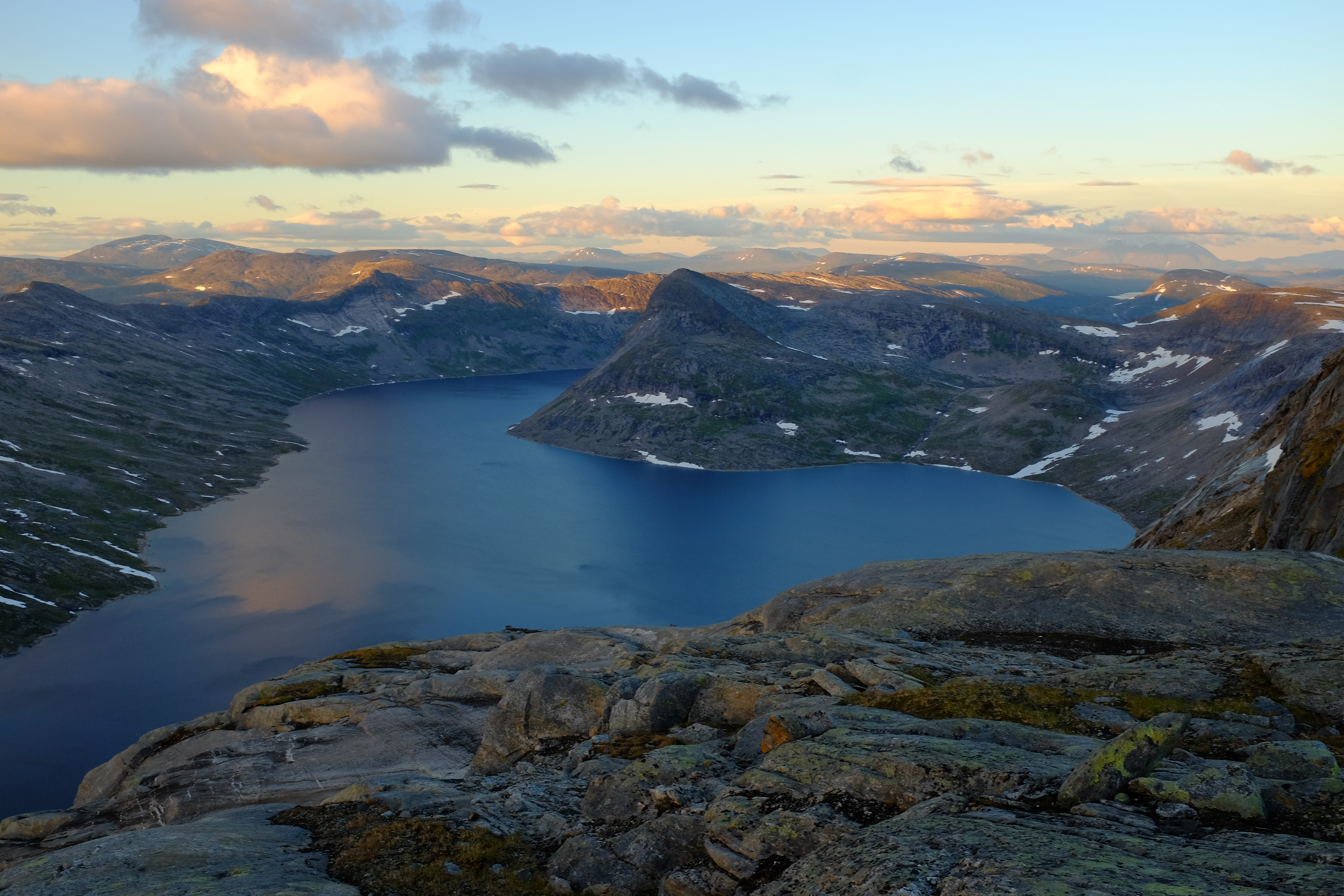
- Interactive map of the lake
- Location: Hamarøy Municipality, Nordland
- Coordinates: 67.6822°N 16.4167°E
- Basin countries: Norway
- Max. length: 12 kilometres (7.5 mi)
- Max. width: 2 kilometres (1.2 mi)
- Surface area: 11.77 km^{2} (4.54 sq mi)
- Shore length^{1}: 31.6 kilometres (19.6 mi)
- Surface elevation: 680 metres (2,230 ft)
- References: NVE
- ^{1} Shore length is not a well-defined measure.

Reinoksvatnet (Norwegian) or Hierggejávrre (Lule Sami) (lit. 'Reindeer Lake') is a lake in Hamarøy Municipality in Nordland county, Norway. It is located about 20 kilometres (12 mi) east of the village of Mørsvikbotn and less than 2 kilometres (1.2 mi) west of the border with Sweden.

== See also ==
- List of lakes in Norway
