= Livsejávrre =

Lake in Nordland, Norway

Livsejávrre (Lule Sami)
- Historic: Livssejávri (Lule Sami)
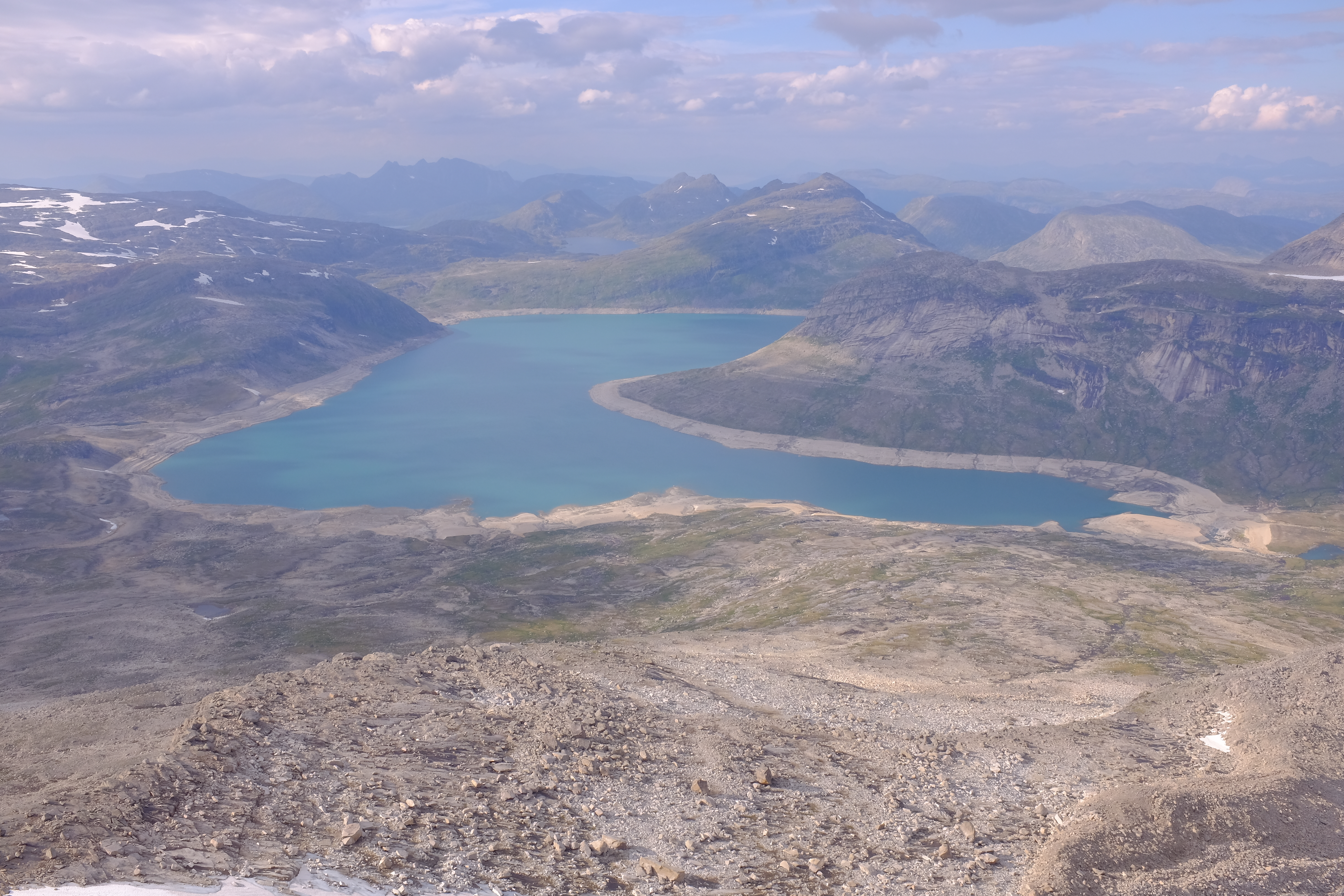
- Interactive map of the lake
- Location: Hamarøy Municipality, Nordland
- Coordinates: 67.7407°N 16.2779°E
- Basin countries: Norway
- Max. length: 7 kilometres (4.3 mi)
- Max. width: 1.6 kilometres (0.99 mi)
- Surface area: 5.84 km^{2} (2.25 sq mi)
- Shore length^{1}: 12.88 kilometres (8.00 mi)
- Surface elevation: 710 metres (2,330 ft)
- References: NVE
- ^{1} Shore length is not a well-defined measure.

Livsejávrre is a lake in Hamarøy Municipality in Nordland county, Norway. It is located about 20 kilometres (12 mi) southeast of the village of Mørsvikbotn and about 6 kilometres (3.7 mi) west of the border with Sweden. The ending -jávrre is the Lule Sami language word for lake.

== See also ==
- List of lakes in Norway
