= Forsvatnet =

Lake in Nordland, Norway

Forsvatnet (Norwegian) Gårttjejávrre (Lule Sami)
- Historic: Goržejávri (Lule Sami)
- Interactive map of the lake
- Location: Sørfold and Hamarøy, Nordland
- Coordinates: 67.6048°N 16.2644°E
- Basin countries: Norway
- Max. length: 7 kilometres (4.3 mi)
- Max. width: 5 kilometres (3.1 mi)
- Surface area: 13.63 km^{2} (5.26 sq mi)
- Shore length^{1}: 38.97 kilometres (24.21 mi)
- Surface elevation: 620 metres (2,030 ft)
- References: NVE
- ^{1} Shore length is not a well-defined measure.

Forsvatnet (Norwegian) or Gårttjejávrre (Lule Sami) is a lake that lies on the border of Sørfold Municipality and Hamarøy Municipality in Nordland county, Norway. The 13.63-square-kilometre (5.26 sq mi) lake lies about 20 kilometres (12 mi) southeast of the village of Mørsvikbotn.

== See also ==
- List of lakes in Norway
- Geography of Norway
