= Rotvatnet =

Lake in Nordland, Norway

Rotvatnet or Nervatnet (Norwegian) Ruohtsajávrre (Lule Sami)
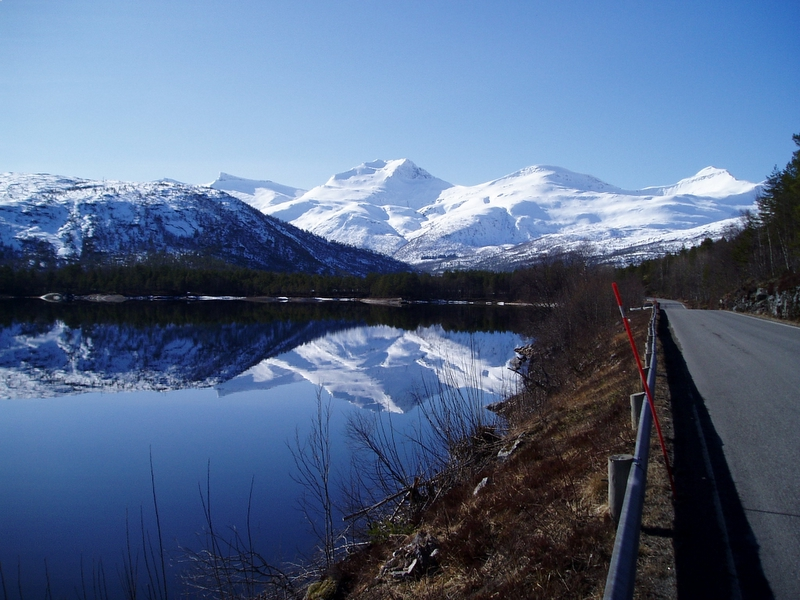
- Interactive map of the lake
- Location: Hamarøy Municipality, Nordland
- Coordinates: 67.8799°N 15.8617°E
- Basin countries: Norway
- Max. length: 3.6 kilometres (2.2 mi)
- Max. width: 2.2 kilometres (1.4 mi)
- Surface area: 3.56 km^{2} (1.37 sq mi)
- Shore length^{1}: 15.64 kilometres (9.72 mi)
- Surface elevation: 45 metres (148 ft)
- References: NVE
- ^{1} Shore length is not a well-defined measure.

Rotvatnet or Nervatnet (Norwegian) or Ruohtsajávrre (Lule Sami) is a lake in Hamarøy Municipality in Nordland county, Norway. The lake lies just west of the village of Tømmerneset. The European route E6 highway runs along the eastern shore of the lake. The lake Strindvatnet lies to the south of this lake.

== See also ==
- List of lakes in Norway
