= Tømmerneset =

Village in Hamarøy Municipality, Norway

Tømmerneset (Norwegian); Vuohppe (Lule Sami)
- Village
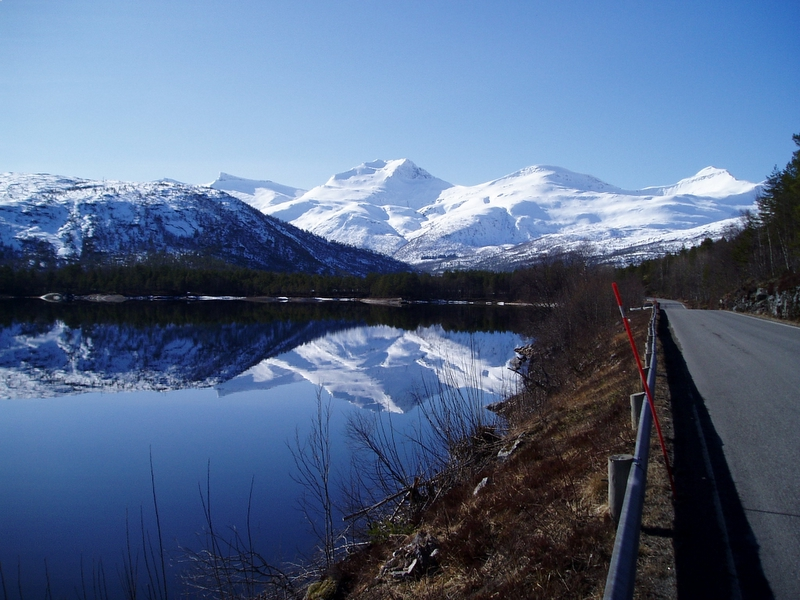
- View near the village
- Interactive map of: Tømmerneset (Norwegian); Vuohppe (Lule Sami)
- Location within Nordland Location within Norway
- Coordinates: 67.8989°N 15.8594°E
- Country: Norway
- Region: Northern Norway
- County: Nordland
- District: Salten
- Municipality: Hamarøy Municipality
- Elevation: 51 m (167 ft)
- Time zone: UTC+01:00 (CET)
  - Summer (DST): UTC+02:00 (CEST)
- Post Code: 8260 Innhavet

Tømmerneset (Norwegian) or Vuohppe (Lule Sami) is a village in Hamarøy Municipality in Nordland county, Norway. It's located on the eastern shore of the lake Rotvatnet, about 50 kilometres (31 mi) south of the municipal centre, Oppeid. Tømmerneset is the site of Tømmernes Church. The village area is located where County Road 835 (and the Steigen Tunnel) branches off from the European Road E6 highway.

== Archaeology ==
There is rock art dating to the Stone Age "near the bridge over Sagelva".

== See also ==
- Rock art at an eponymous place in another county
