= Tømmernes Church =

Tømmerneset Church
- Tømmerneset kirke Vuohpe girkko
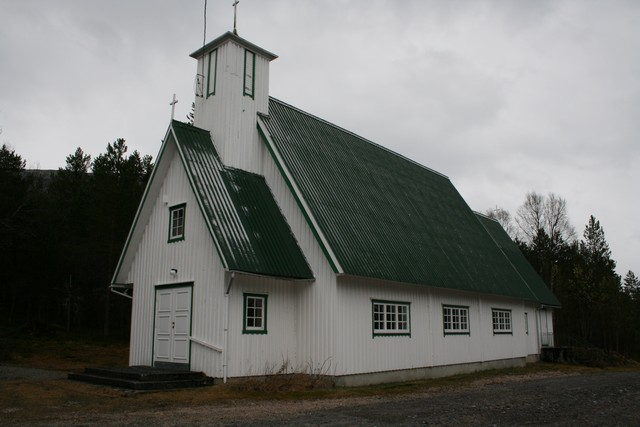
- View of the church
- Tømmerneset Church
- 67.89687399°N 15.86316078°E
- Location: Hamarøy Municipality, Nordland
- Country: Norway
- Denomination: Church of Norway
- Churchmanship: Evangelical Lutheran

History
- Status: Parish church
- Founded: 1952
- Consecrated: 5 October 1952

Architecture
- Functional status: Active
- Architect: Eiliv Dahl
- Architectural type: Long church
- Completed: 1952 (74 years ago)

Specifications
- Capacity: 110
- Materials: Wood

Administration
- Diocese: Sør-Hålogaland
- Deanery: Ofoten prosti
- Parish: Sagfjord
- Norwegian Cultural Heritage Site
- Type: Church
- Status: Not protected
- ID: 85702

Tømmerneset Church (Norwegian: Tømmerneset kirke or Northern Sami: Vuohpe girkko) is a parish church of the Church of Norway in Hamarøy Municipality in Nordland county, Norway. It is located in the village of Tømmerneset. It is one of the churches for the Sagfjord parish which is part of the Ofoten prosti (deanery) in the Diocese of Sør-Hålogaland. The white, wooden church was built in a long church style in 1952 using plans drawn up by the architect Eilif Dahl. The church seats about 110 people.

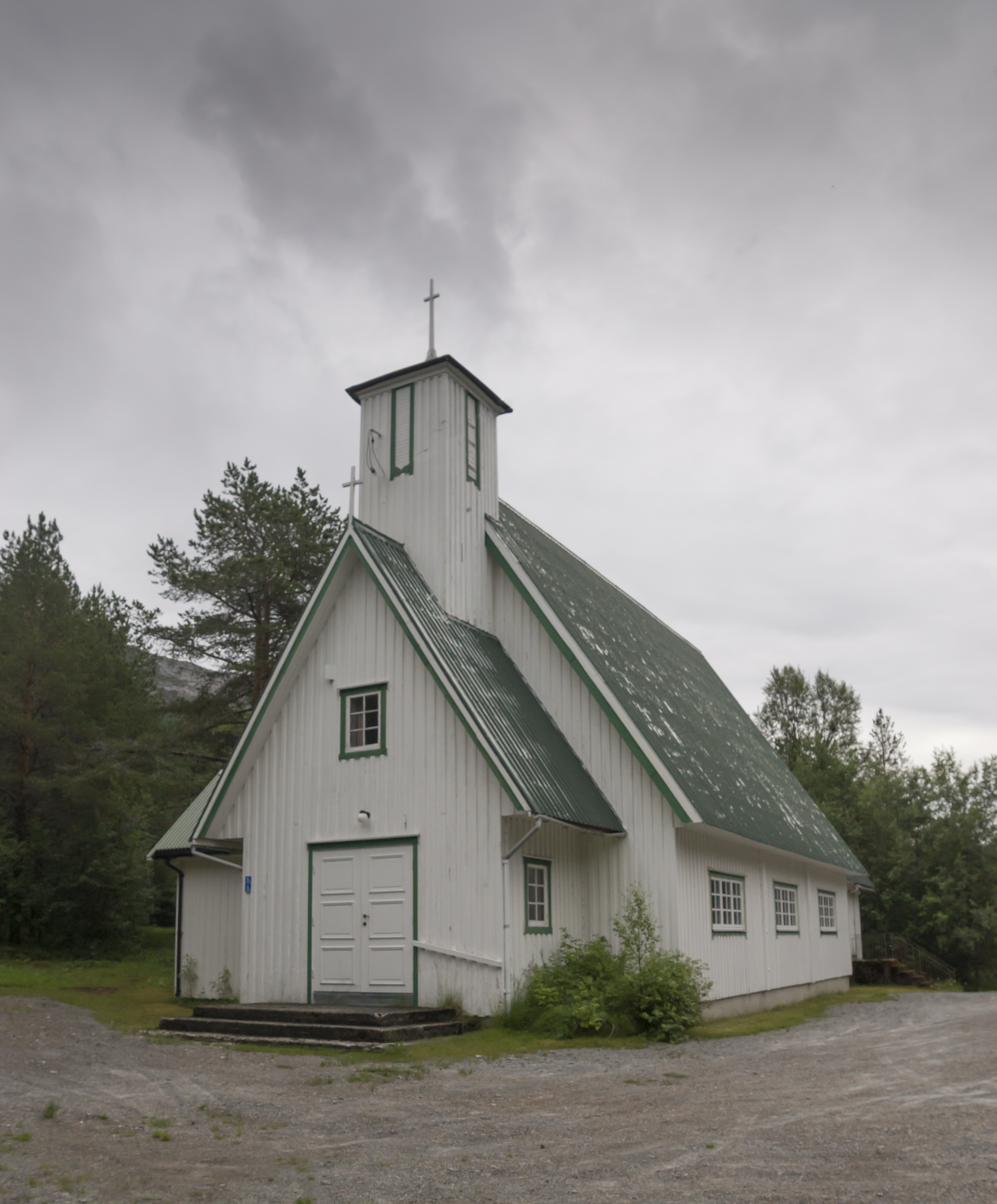
View of the church

== See also ==
- List of churches in Sør-Hålogaland
