= Skrova =

Island group in Nordland, Norway

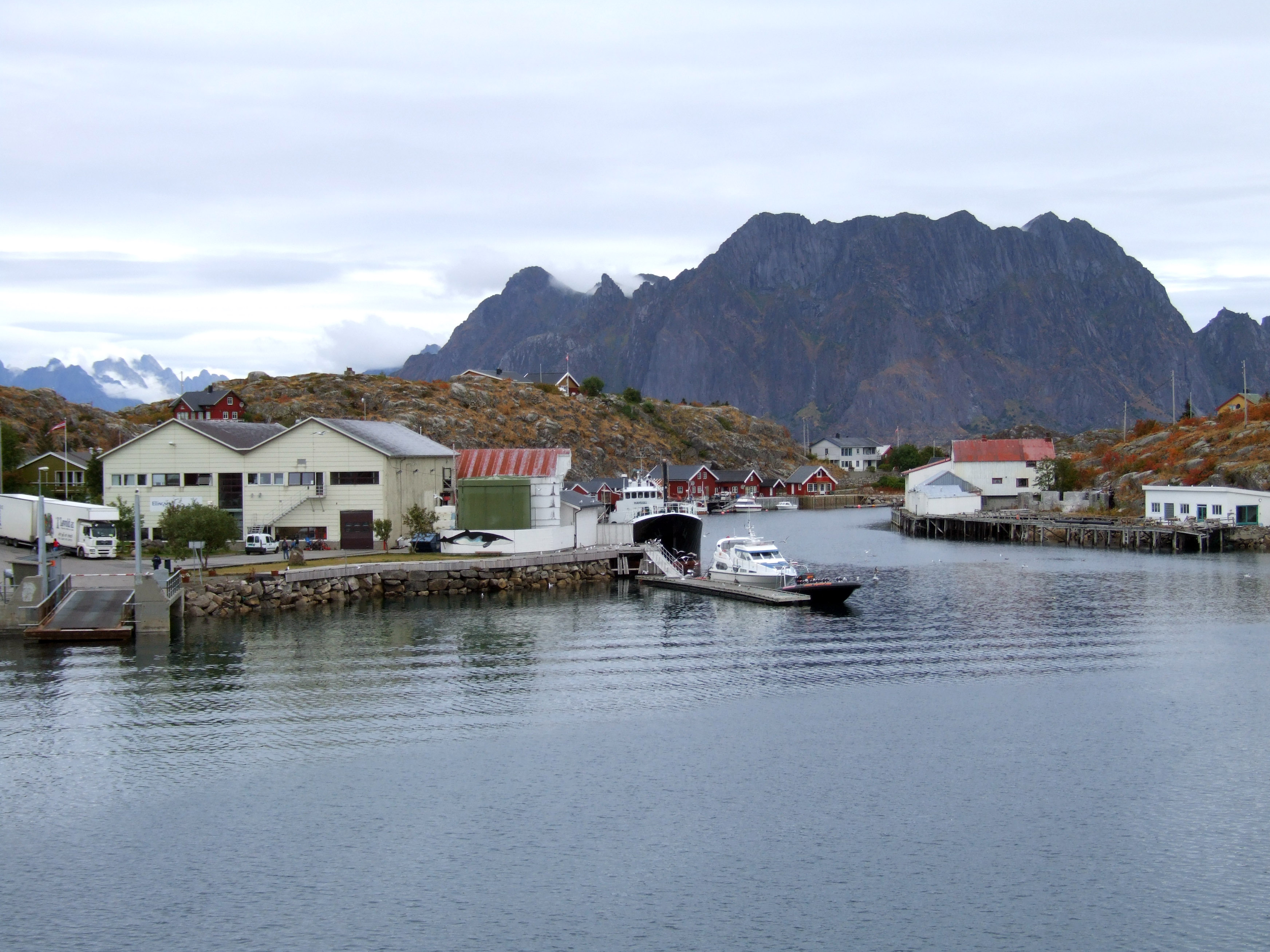
- Skrova, with the Lofoten wall in the background
- Interactive map of Skrova

Geography
- Location: Nordland, Norway
- Coordinates: 68.1673°N 14.6606°E
- Archipelago: Lofoten
- Length: 3 km (1.9 mi)
- Width: 2 km (1.2 mi)
- Highest elevation: 258 m (846 ft)
- Highest point: Høgskrova

Administration
- Norway
- County: Nordland
- Municipality: Vågan Municipality

Skrova is a small island group and village area in Vågan Municipality in Nordland county, Norway.

== Village ==
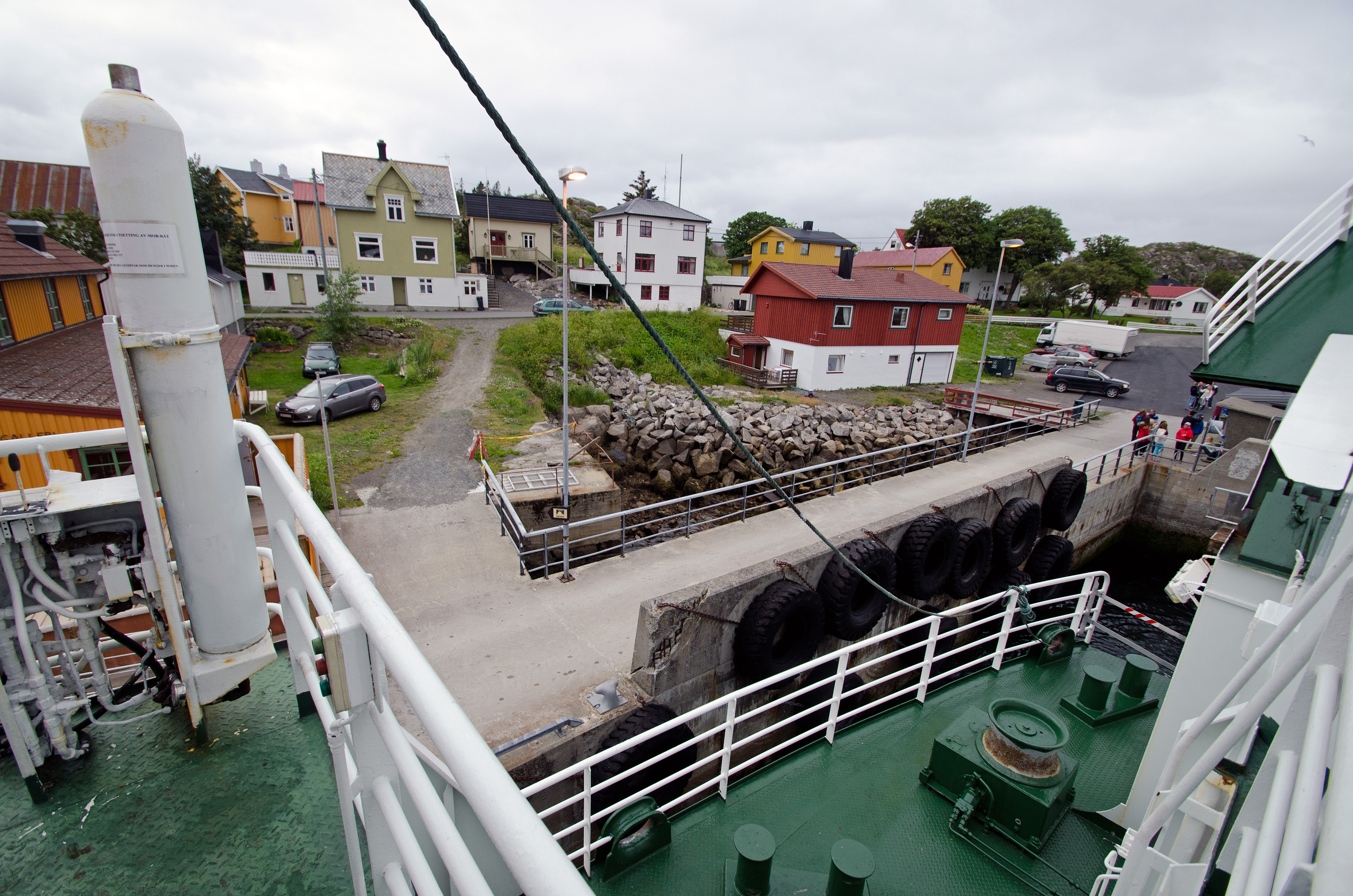

The fishing village of Skrova lies on the northern part of the island group. It exists mostly on the island of Heimskrova, but also includes parts of five other islands, including the northwestern edge of the large islands of Skrova. The village is connected to the town of Svolvær (also in Vågan Municipality) and the village of Skutvika (in Hamarøy Municipality on the mainland) by regularly scheduled ferry routes. The village has a population (2017) of 182, with nearly all the residents living in the village and the rest of the island group being virtually uninhabited.

The village gained privileged trading rights in 1760, and for a long time, it was the largest fishing village in Lofoten.

== Industry ==
The main industry in Skrova is fishing, fish farming, and whaling. It is one of the largest whaling stations in Norway, taking in about half of the whale meat in Norway each year. The heyday of Skrova was in the 1970s and 1980s, when fishing and whaling were booming. Since the year 2000, there is now only one fishing factory, called Ellingsen's.

== Geography and climate ==
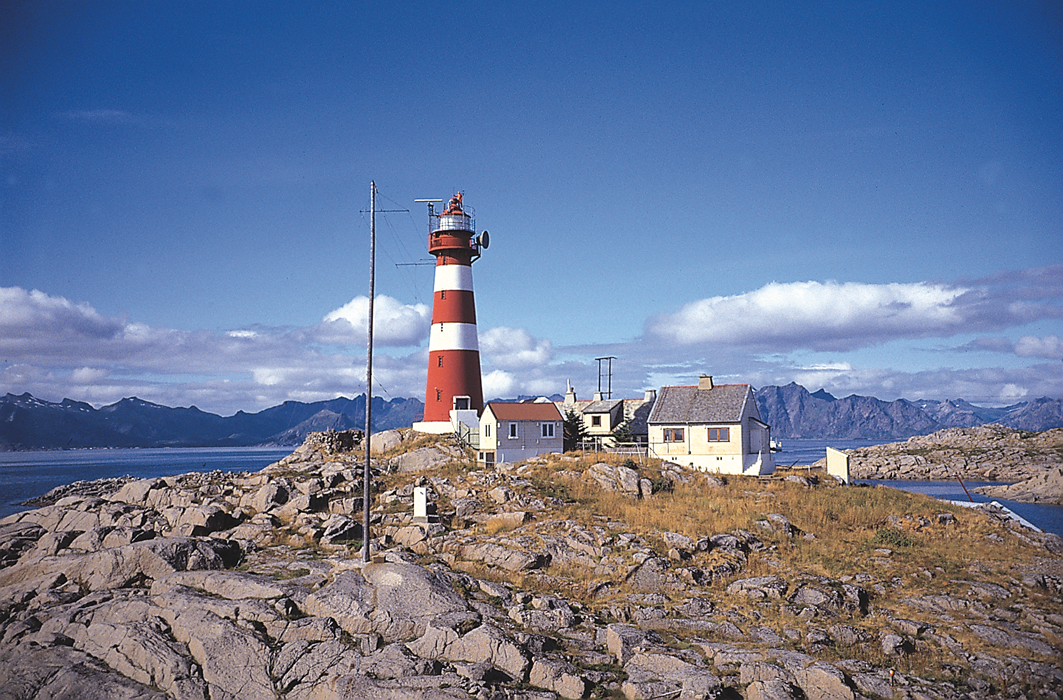
Skrova Lighthouse

The 2.5-square-kilometre (0.97 sq mi) Skrova island group is part of the Lofoten archipelago in the Vestfjorden south of the island Austvågøya. Skrova is about 9 kilometres (5.6 mi) southeast of the town of Svolvær. It close to Litlmolla and Stormolla. The largest island in the group is Storskrova and the island of Heimskrova is where most of the population is located. The six main inhabited islands in the group are all interconnected by a small bridge and several man-made causeways.

Skrova Lighthouse is located in the southwestern part of the island group, about 2 km away from the village of same name. It was established in 1922 and not fully automated until 2005. There is also a meteorological weather station in the island group, near the lighthouse, with one of the longest recording series in Nordland county.

Skrova has a temperate oceanic climate (Cfb) despite the location 180 kilometres (110 mi) north of the Arctic Circle. The warmest temperature recorded is 30.4 °C (86.7 °F) in June 1972. The coldest temperature recorded is −15.1 °C (4.8 °F) in February 1966. The wettest month recorded is December 1936 with 227 millimetres (8.9 in), and the driest is January 2014 with 0.9 millimetres (0.035 in).

Climate data for Skrova 1991-2020 (14 m, precipitation days 1961-90, extremes 1934-2025)
Month	Jan	Feb	Mar	Apr	May	Jun	Jul	Aug	Sep	Oct	Nov	Dec	Year
Record high °C (°F)	10.6 (51.1)	8.5 (47.3)	10 (50)	17.4 (63.3)	24.3 (75.7)	30.4 (86.7)	29.8 (85.6)	27.7 (81.9)	22.1 (71.8)	17.1 (62.8)	13 (55)	11.2 (52.2)	30.4 (86.7)
Mean daily maximum °C (°F)	2.4 (36.3)	1.6 (34.9)	2.2 (36.0)	4.8 (40.6)	9 (48)	13 (55)	16.1 (61.0)	15.4 (59.7)	12 (54)	7.8 (46.0)	5.4 (41.7)	3.6 (38.5)	7.8 (46.0)
Daily mean °C (°F)	0.9 (33.6)	0.2 (32.4)	0.7 (33.3)	3.1 (37.6)	6.8 (44.2)	10.6 (51.1)	13.6 (56.5)	13.3 (55.9)	10.4 (50.7)	6.5 (43.7)	4 (39)	2.2 (36.0)	6.0 (42.8)
Mean daily minimum °C (°F)	−1 (30)	−1.6 (29.1)	−0.9 (30.4)	1.4 (34.5)	4.9 (40.8)	8.6 (47.5)	11.5 (52.7)	11.5 (52.7)	8.8 (47.8)	4.9 (40.8)	2.2 (36.0)	0.3 (32.5)	4.2 (39.6)
Record low °C (°F)	−12.7 (9.1)	−15.1 (4.8)	−12.3 (9.9)	−8.5 (16.7)	−3.4 (25.9)	−1.2 (29.8)	3.7 (38.7)	3.9 (39.0)	−1.4 (29.5)	−4.5 (23.9)	−10.7 (12.7)	−11.9 (10.6)	−15.1 (4.8)
Average precipitation mm (inches)	89 (3.5)	81 (3.2)	65 (2.6)	49 (1.9)	46 (1.8)	37 (1.5)	50 (2.0)	48 (1.9)	79 (3.1)	88 (3.5)	97 (3.8)	90 (3.5)	819 (32.3)
Average precipitation days (≥ 1.0 mm)	14	11	11	10	9	9	11	10	15	17	15	15	147
Source 1: Norwegian Meteorological Institute
Source 2: Noaa WMO averages 91-2020 Norway

== Media gallery ==
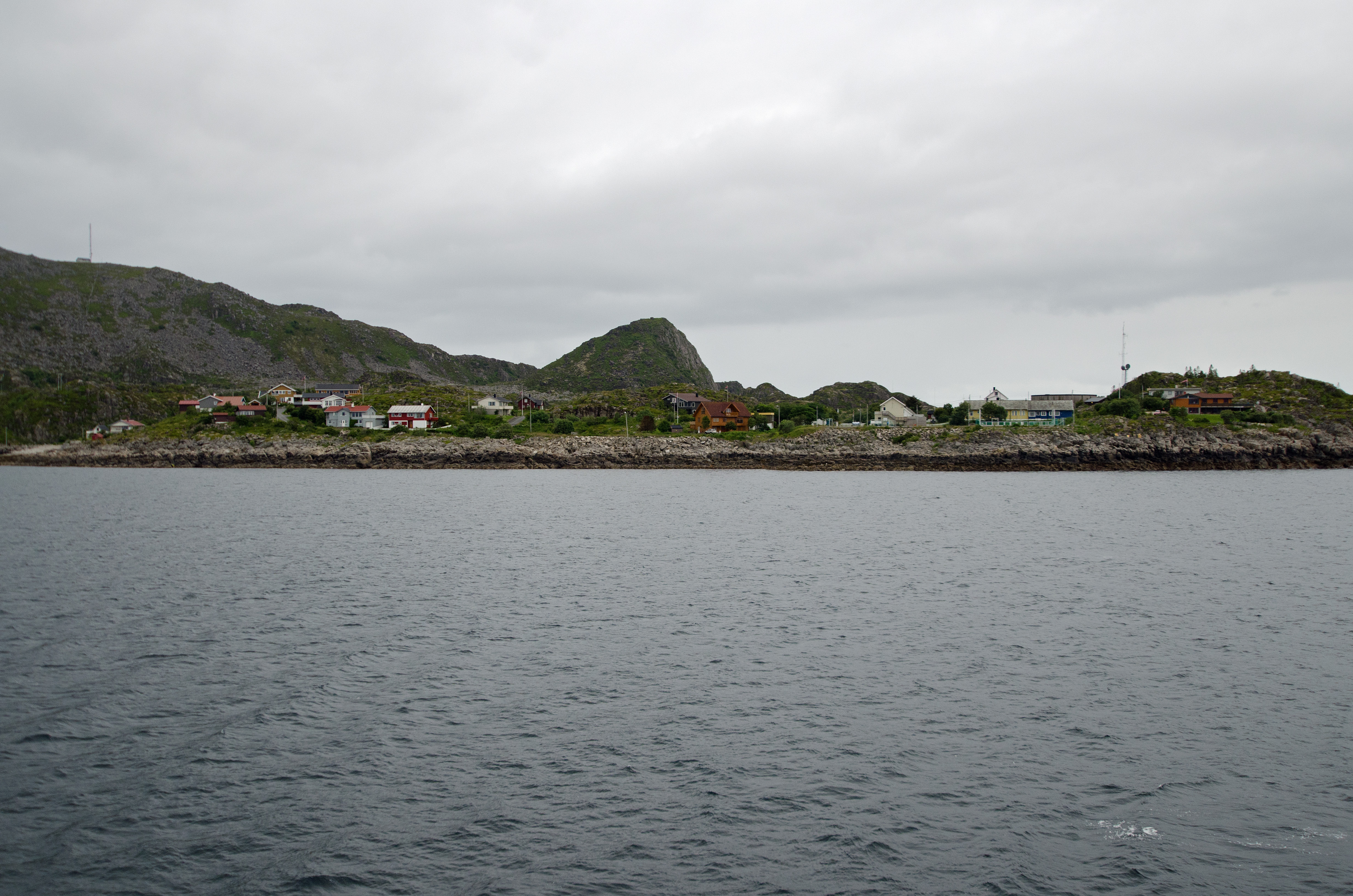

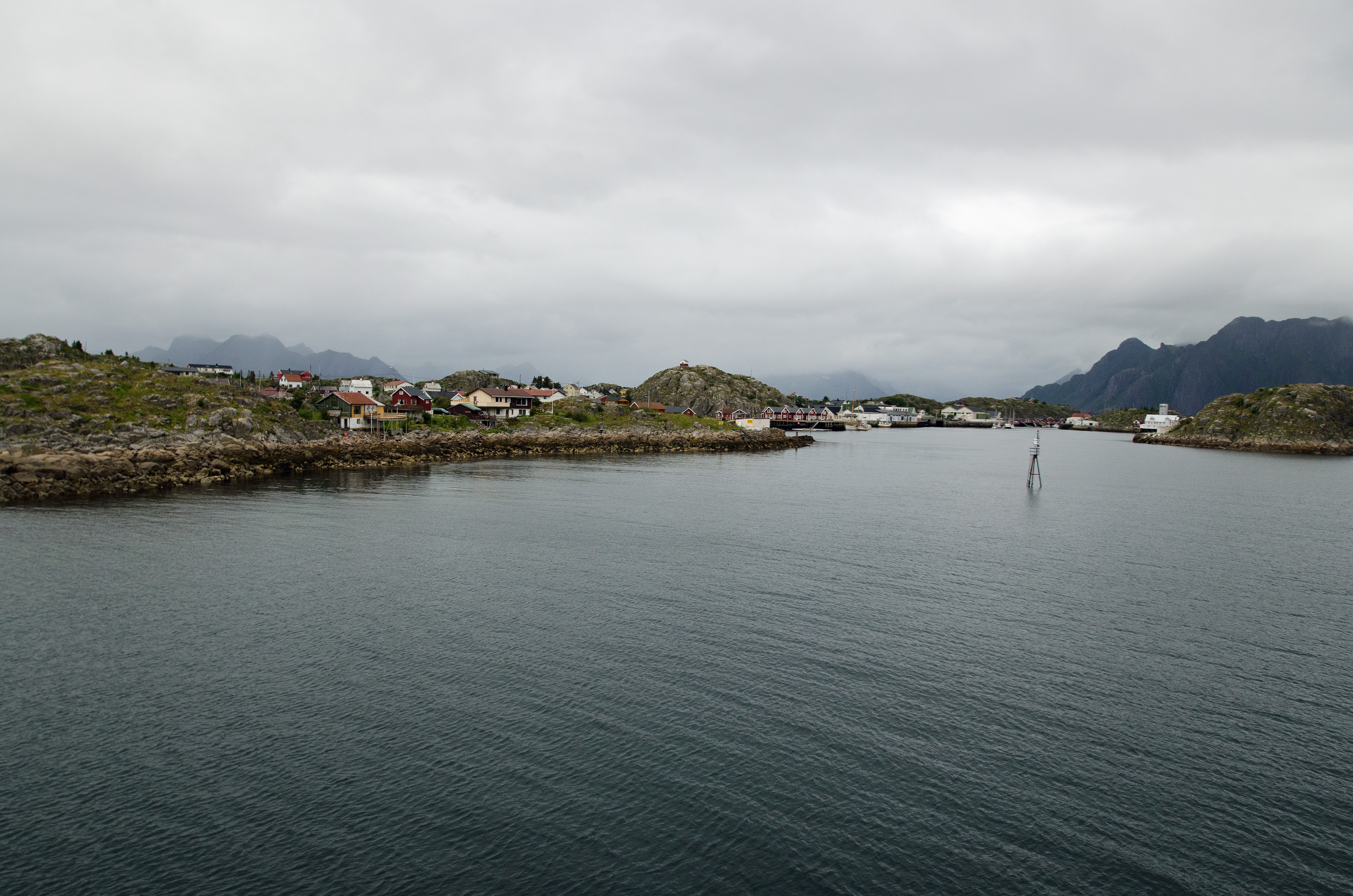

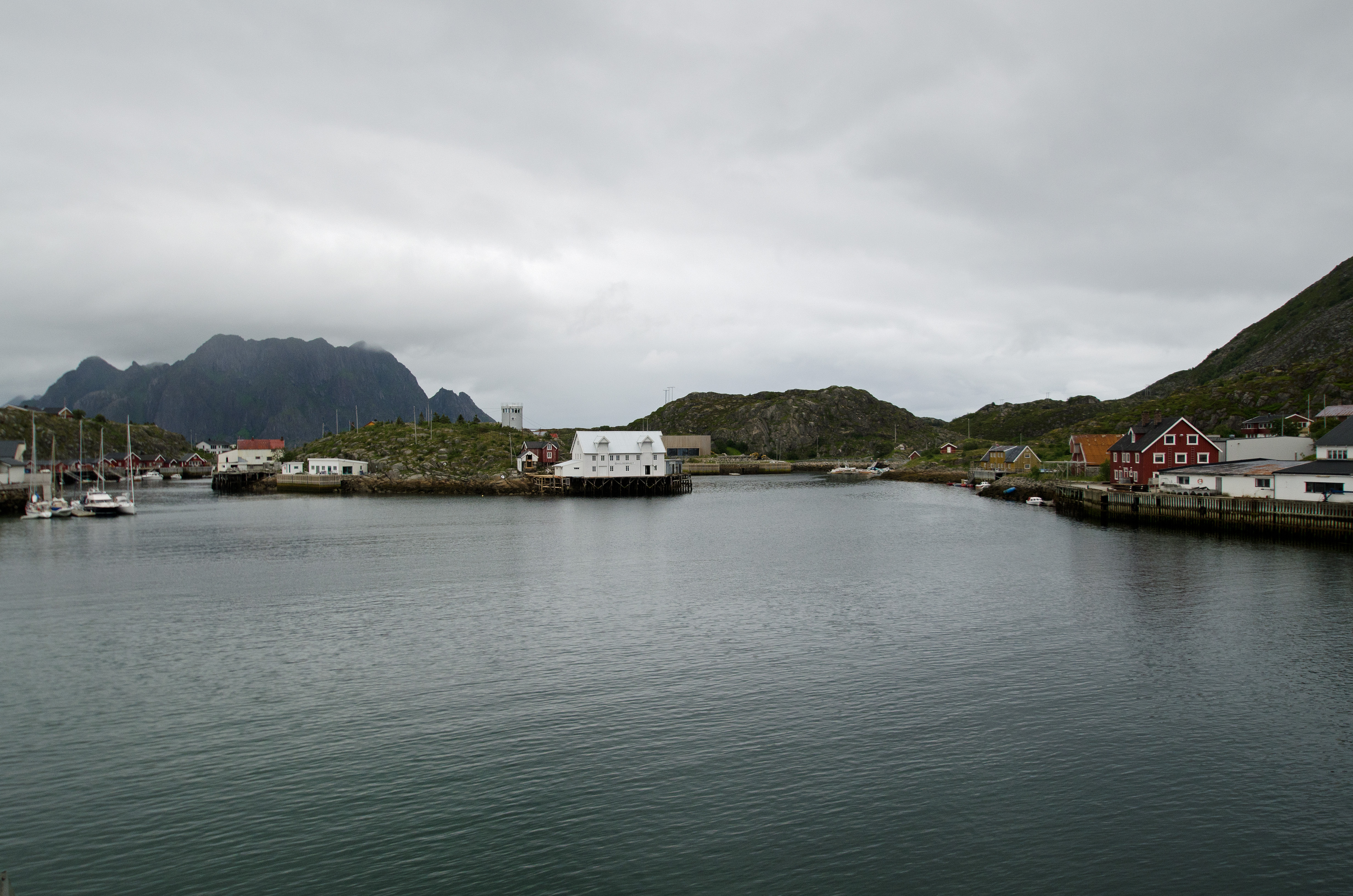

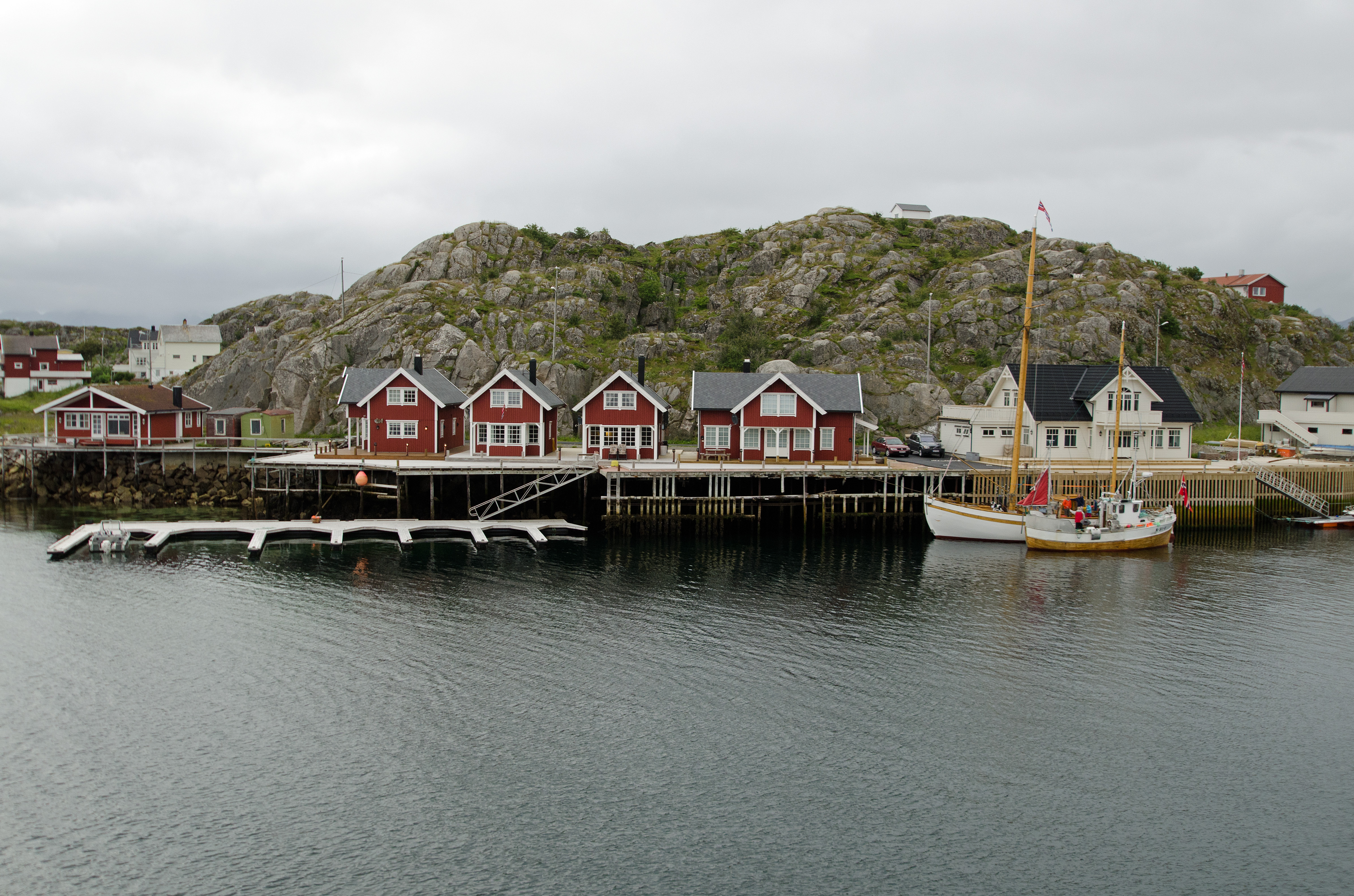

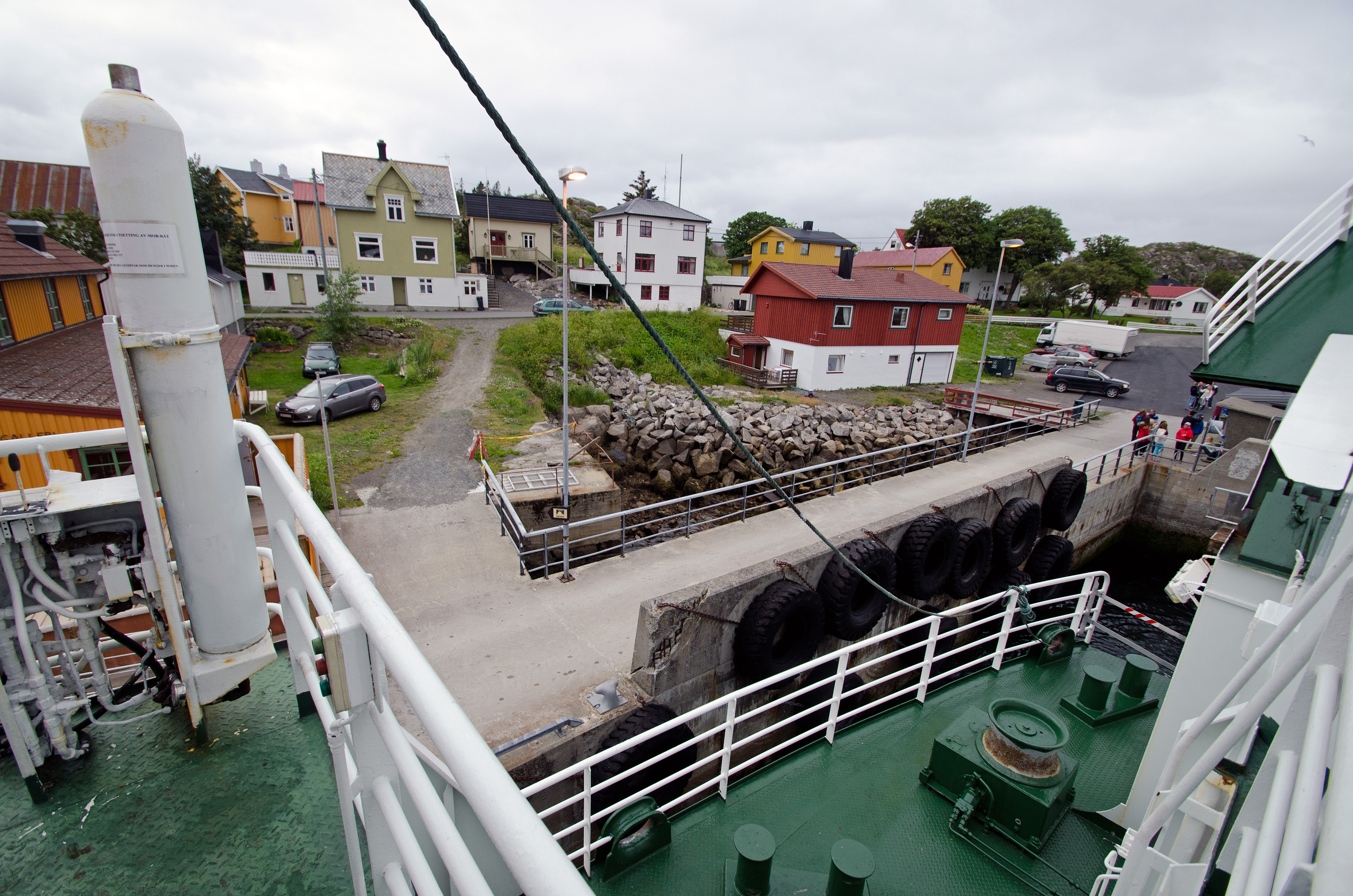

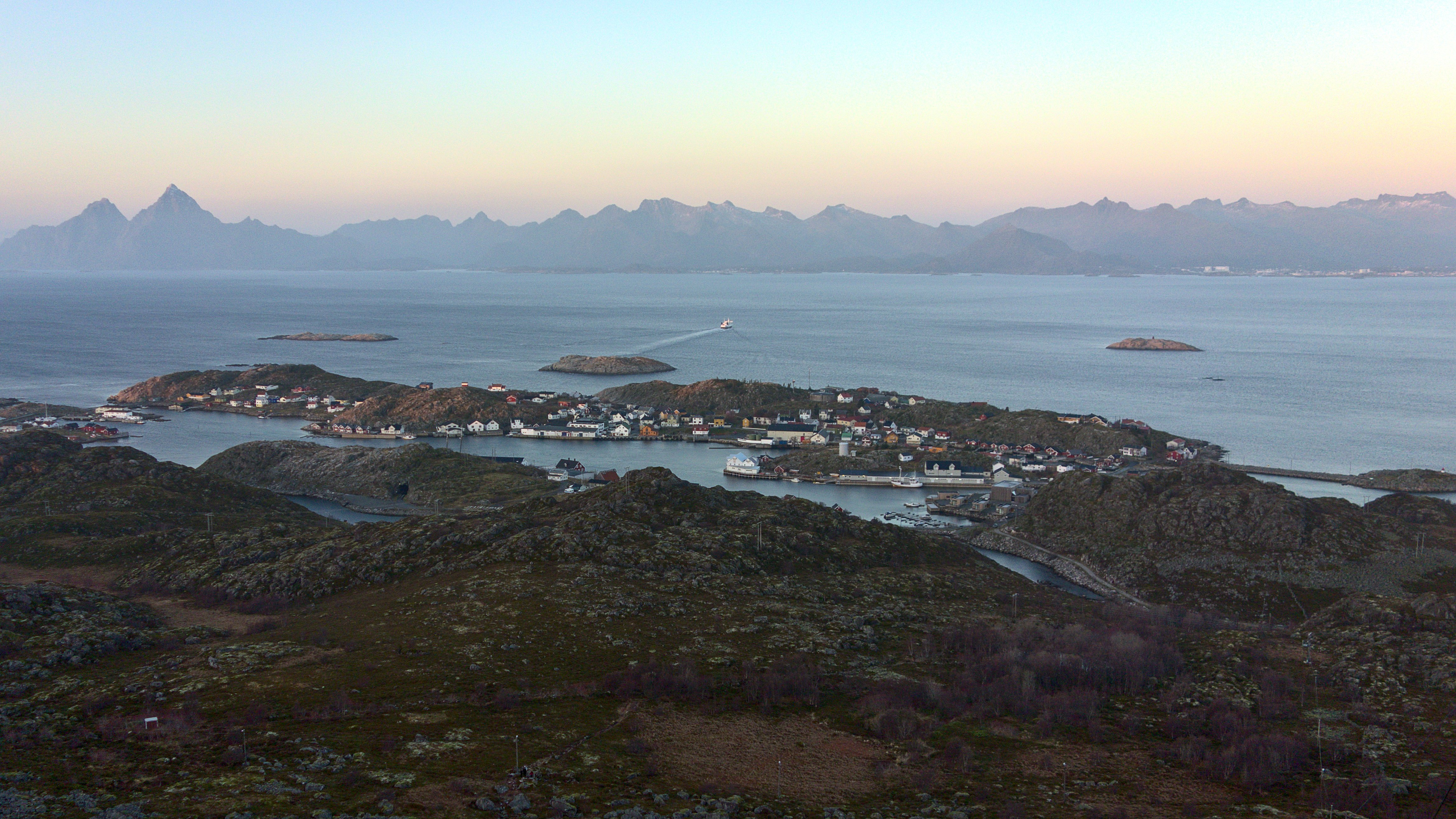

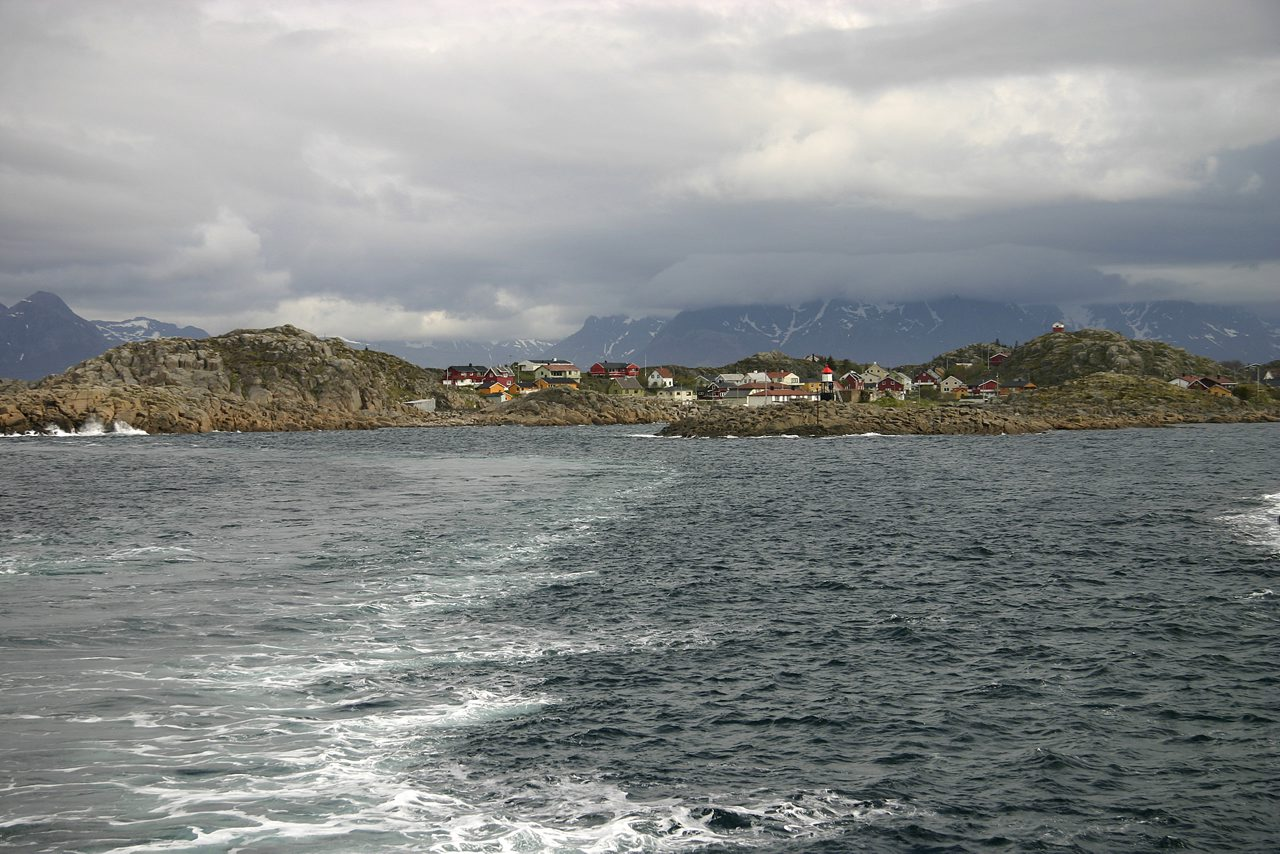

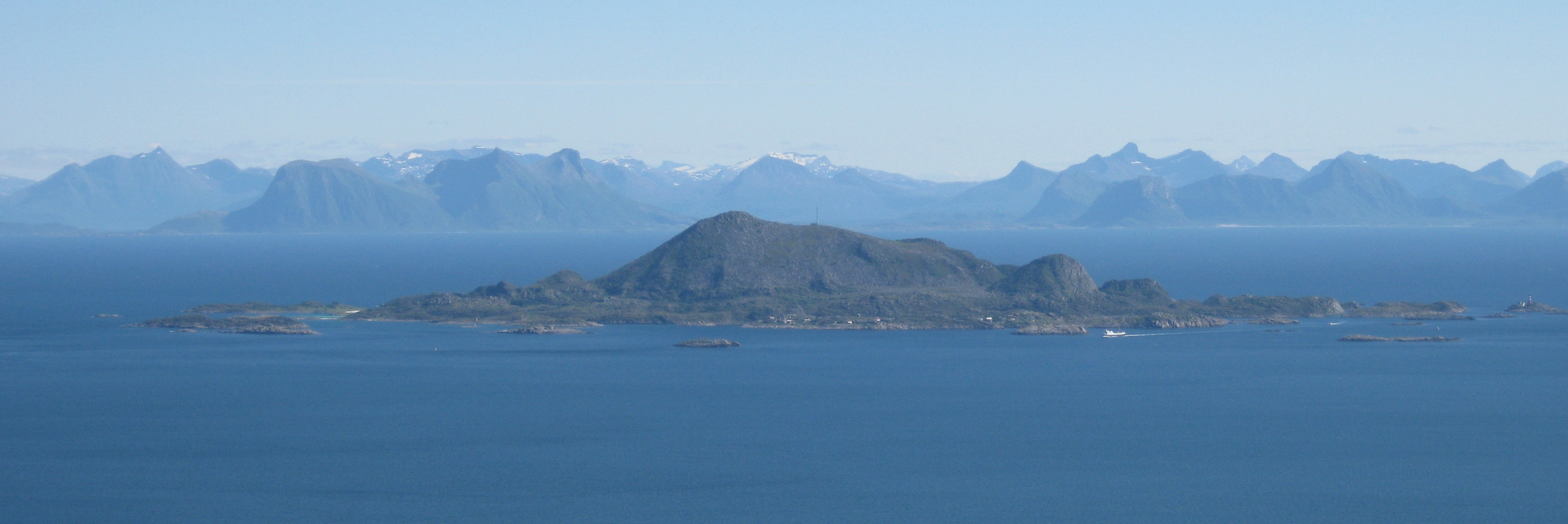

== See also ==
- List of islands of Norway
