= Stoklands Bilruter =

Norwegian bus company

Stocklands Bilruter AS was a bus company operating in Hamarøy Municipality in Nordland county, Norway. t operated on a contract with the Nordland county municipality.

The company was founded in 1924 by Ludvig Stokland that started operation with a Ford Model T. A few years later he started scheduled services between Presteid and Skutvika and also between Hamsund and Buvåg. In 1935, he bought his first bus. The company became a limited company in 1959, and by 1986 Stockland Bilruter had 29 vehicles. The next year, it was bought by Saltens Bilruter.
