= Hamarøy Municipality =

Municipality in Nordland, Norway

Hamarøy Municipality Hamarøy kommune Hábmera suohkan
- Municipality
- Hammerø herred (historic name)
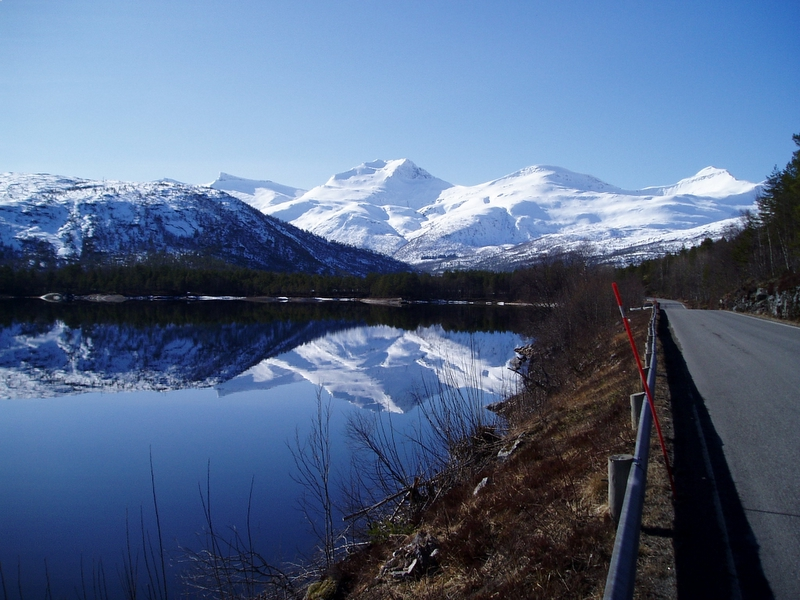
- View near Tømmernes in Hamarøy

- Coat of arms

- Nordland within Norway

- Hamarøy within Nordland
- Coordinates: 68°04′33″N 15°46′56″E
- Country: Norway
- County: Nordland
- District: Salten
- Established: 1 Jan 1838
  - Created as: Formannskapsdistrikt
- Administrative centre: Oppeid

Government
  - Mayor (2019): Britt Kristoffersen Løksa (Sp)

Area
  - Total: 2,020.44 km^{2} (780.10 sq mi)
  - Land: 1,837.61 km^{2} (709.51 sq mi)
  - Water: 182.83 km^{2} (70.59 sq mi) 9%
  - Rank: #36 in Norway
- Highest elevation: 1,517.49 m (4,978.6 ft)

Population (2024)
  - Total: 2,729
  - Rank: #243 in Norway
  - Density: 1.4/km^{2} (3.6/sq mi)
  - Change (10 years): ▲ +49.9%
- Demonym(s): Hamarøying; Hamarøyværing

Official languages
  - Norwegian form: Neutral
  - Sámi form: Lule Sami
- Time zone: UTC+01:00 (CET)
  - Summer (DST): UTC+02:00 (CEST)
- ISO 3166 code: NO-1875
- Website: Official website

Hamarøy (Norwegian) or Hábmer (Lule Sami) is a municipality in Nordland county, Norway. It is part of the traditional district of Salten. The administrative centre of the municipality is the village of Oppeid. Other villages include Drag, Hellmobotn, Innhavet, Karlsøy, Korsnes, Presteid, Skutvika, Tømmerneset, Tranøya, and Ulvsvåg.

The 2,020-square-kilometre (780 sq mi) municipality is the 36th largest by area out of the 357 municipalities in Norway. Hamarøy Municipality is the 243rd most populous municipality in Norway with a population of 2,729. The municipality's population density is 1.4 inhabitants per square kilometre (3.6/sq mi) and its population has increased by about 50% over the previous 10-year period (due to the enlargement of the municipality when part of Tysfjord Municipaltiy became part of Hamarøy in 2020).

== General information ==
The municipality of Hamarøy was established on 1 January 1838 (see formannskapsdistrikt law). During the 1960s, there were many municipal mergers across Norway due to the work of the Schei Committee. On 1 January 1964, the part of Hamarøy located on the south side of the Sagfjorden and west of the Veggfjellan mountain (population: 77) was transferred to neighboring Steigen Municipality. On the same date, the Tysnes and Molvik farms (population: 33) was transferred from Hamarøy to the neighboring Tysfjord Municipality.

On 1 January 2020, the western part of Tysfjord Municipality was merged into Hamarøy Municipality. This occurred because in 2017, it was decided by the Parliament of Norway that the neighboring Tysfjord Municipality would be divided along the Tysfjorden with the eastern half being merged with the neighboring Narvik Municipality and Ballangen Municipality to form a new, larger Narvik Municipality and the remaining western half will be merged with Hamarøy Municipality on the same date.

=== Name ===
The municipality (originally the parish) is named after the old Hamarøya island (Old Norse: Hamarøy), which is now a peninsula, since the first Hamarøy Church was built there. The first element is the genitive case of the word hǫm which means "thigh/leg (of an animal)". The last element is øy which means "island". This was likely because the island (or a part of it) was shaped in the form of an animal's leg. Historically, the name of the municipality was spelled Hammerø. On 6 January 1908, a royal resolution changed the spelling of the name of the municipality to Hamarøy.

On 21 January 2011, the national government approved a resolution to add a co-equal, official Sami language name for the municipality: Hábmer. The spelling of the Sami language name changes depending on how it is used. It is called Hábmer when it is spelled alone, but it is Hábmera suohkan when using the Sami language equivalent to "Hamarøy Municipality".

=== Coat of arms ===
Arms (1982-2019)

Current arms since 2020

The original coat of arms was granted on 19 February 1982 and in use until 1 January 2020 when the new arms were put into use. The official blazon is "Azure, a lynx statant guardant argent" (Norwegian: I blått en stående sølv gaupe). This means the arms have a blue field (background) and the charge is a lynx. The lynx has a tincture of argent which means it is commonly colored white, but if it is made out of metal, then silver is used. Lynx are common in the area it was chosen for the arms as a symbol for the rich wildlife in the forests of the municipality. The arms were designed by Asbjørn Mathiassen.

The current coat of arms was adopted in 2019 for use starting on 1 January 2020 after a municipal merger. The blazon is "Azure, a rock carving of two swans argent". This means the arms have a blue field (background) and the charge is a depiction of a 9,000-year-old rock carving of the outlines of two swans. The swans have a tincture of argent which means they are commonly colored white, but if it is made out of metal, then silver is used. The ancient rock carving seen at Dyreberget in Leiknes is a notable historical feature for the municipality. The two swans also symbolize the two cultures of the municipality: Norwegian and Lule Sami. The arms were designed by Ingar Nikolaisen Kuoljok and Dag Winsjansen.

=== Churches ===
The Church of Norway has two parishes (sokn) within Hamarøy Municipality. It is part of the Ofoten prosti (deanery) in the Diocese of Sør-Hålogaland.

Churches in Hamarøy Municipality
Parish (sokn)	Church name	Location of the church	Year built
Hamarøy	Hamarøy Church	Presteid	1974
Sagfjord	Sagfjord Church	Karlsøy	1770
Sagfjord	Tømmernes Church	Tømmerneset	1952

== Geography ==
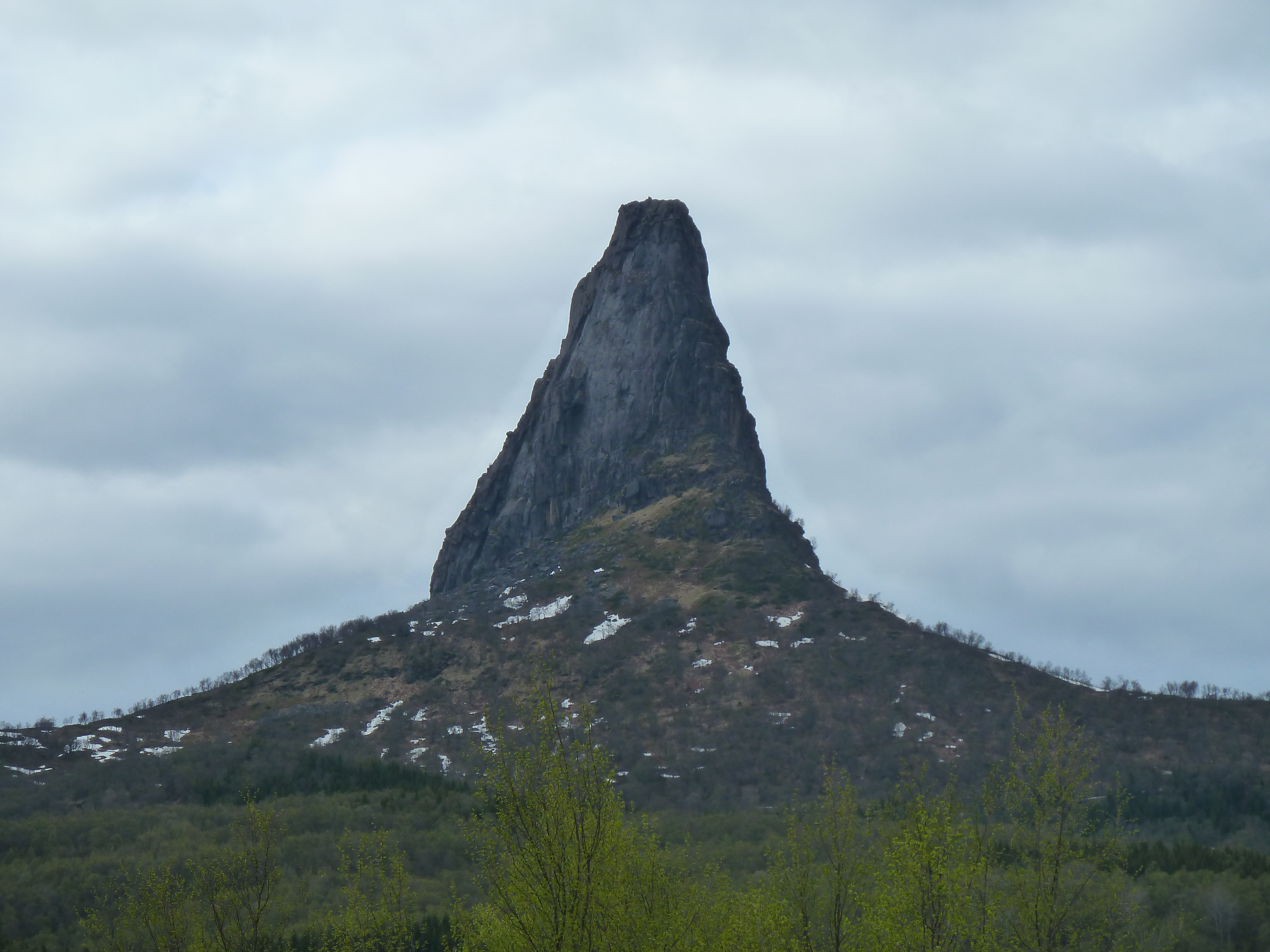
Hamarøyskaftet mountain in spring

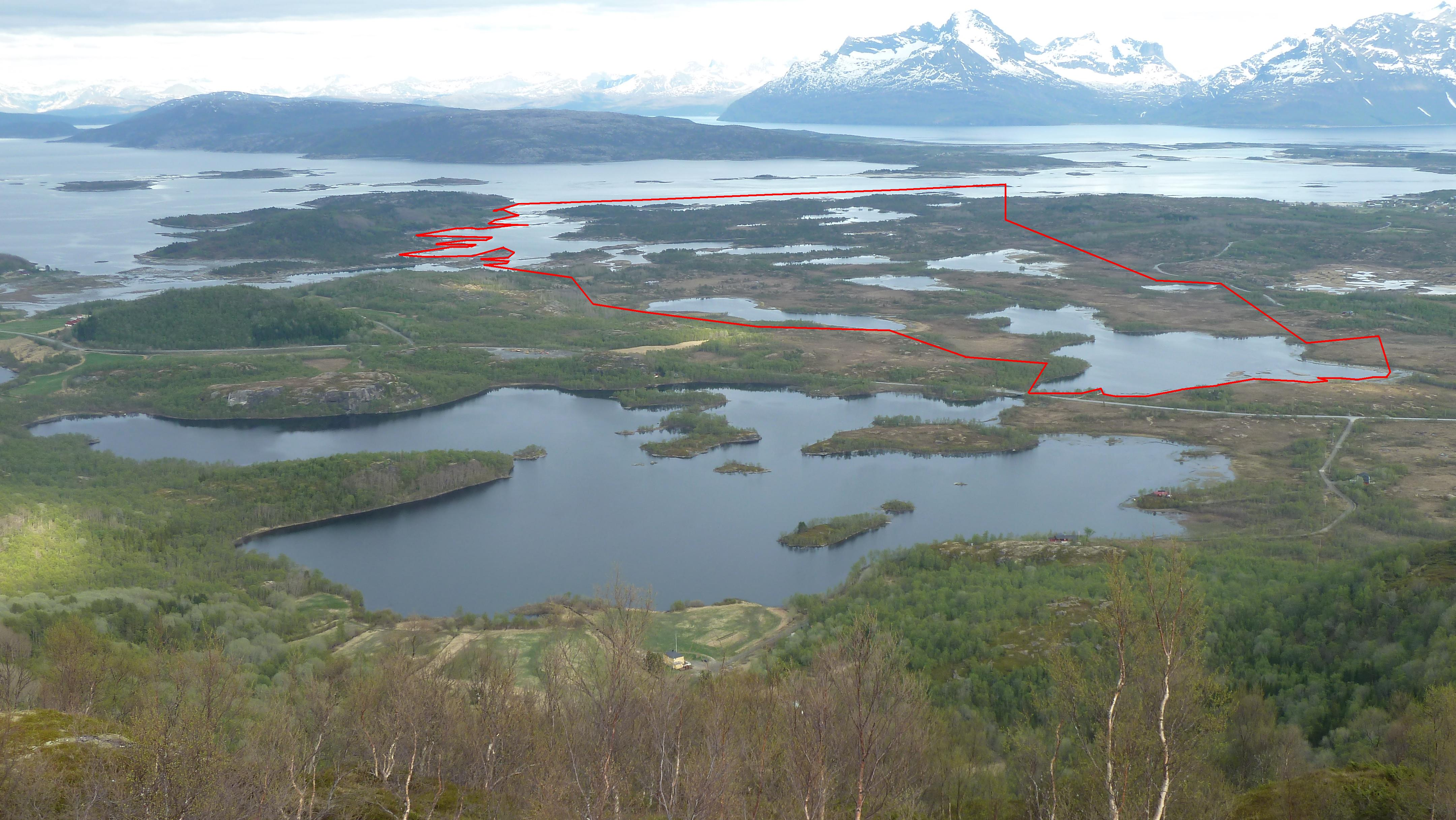
Map of Steinslandvatnet nature reserve

Hamarøy Municipality borders Narvik Municipality to the north, Steigen Municipality to the west, Sørfold Municipality to the south, the Vestfjorden to the northwest, and the country of Sweden to the southeast. The large island of Finnøya is located between the Sagfjorden and the Kaldvågfjorden. The highest point in the municipality is the 1,517.49-metre (4,978.6 ft) tall mountain Bjørntoppen.

Lakes in the municipality include Fjerdvatnet, Forsanvatnet, Forsvatnet, Kaldvågvatnet, Kilvatnet, Livsejávrre, Makkvatnet, Reinoksvatnet, Rekvatnet, Rotvatnet, Sandnesvatnet, Skilvatnet, Šluŋkkajávri, and Strindvatnet.

=== Nature ===
Hamarøy is dominated by small fjords, pine, birch, and aspen woodland and forest, and coastal mountains. There are several nature reserves, such as Trollpollen nature reserve dominated by pine and birch located a few kilometers north of Innhavet, Lilandsvatnet wetland area, Steinslandsosen estuary, and Kvannskogen with old aspen trees with rich lichen flora. The mountain Hamarøyskaftet has long been regarded as nature's own phallic symbol (See picture 1 and picture 2).

=== Climate ===
Hamarøy has an oceanic or boreal climate, depending on winter threshold used (0 °C (32 °F) or −3 °C (27 °F)). The wettest season is autumn and early winter, while April - June is the driest, indicating an oceanic climate. The record high is 33.7 °C (92.7 °F) recorded 18 July 2018 at Drag.

Climate data for Drag 1991-2020 (19 m)
Month	Jan	Feb	Mar	Apr	May	Jun	Jul	Aug	Sep	Oct	Nov	Dec	Year
Daily mean °C (°F)	−2.1 (28.2)	−2.3 (27.9)	−1 (30)	2.6 (36.7)	6.9 (44.4)	10.7 (51.3)	14.1 (57.4)	13.1 (55.6)	9.6 (49.3)	4.6 (40.3)	1.4 (34.5)	−0.8 (30.6)	4.7 (40.5)
Average precipitation mm (inches)	78 (3.1)	70 (2.8)	70 (2.8)	53 (2.1)	56 (2.2)	58 (2.3)	63 (2.5)	67 (2.6)	102 (4.0)	96 (3.8)	83 (3.3)	91 (3.6)	887 (35.1)
Source: yr.no

== Government ==
Hamarøy Municipality is responsible for primary education (through 10th grade), outpatient health services, senior citizen services, welfare and other social services, zoning, economic development, and municipal roads and utilities. The municipality is governed by a municipal council of directly elected representatives. The mayor is indirectly elected by a vote of the municipal council. The municipality is under the jurisdiction of the Midtre Hålogaland District Court and the Hålogaland Court of Appeal.

=== Municipal council ===
The municipal council (Kommunestyre) of Hamarøy Municipality is made up of 17 representatives that are elected to four year terms. The tables below show the current and historical composition of the council by political party.

Hamarøy kommunestyre 2023–2027
Party name (in Norwegian)	Number of representatives
Labour Party (Arbeiderpartiet)	3
Progress Party (Fremskrittspartiet)	2
Conservative Party (Høyre)	5
Centre Party (Senterpartiet)	5
Socialist Left Party (Sosialistisk Venstreparti)	1
Liberal Party (Venstre)	1
Total number of members:	17

Hamarøy kommunestyre 2019–2023
Party name (in Norwegian)	Number of representatives
Labour Party (Arbeiderpartiet)	4
Progress Party (Fremskrittspartiet)	1
Conservative Party (Høyre)	4
Centre Party (Senterpartiet)	6
Socialist Left Party (Sosialistisk Venstreparti)	1
Liberal Party (Venstre)	1
Total number of members:	17
Note: On 1 January 2020, part of Tysfjord Municipality became part of Hamarøy Municipality.

Hamarøy kommunestyre 2015–2019
Party name (in Norwegian)	Number of representatives
Labour Party (Arbeiderpartiet)	4
Progress Party (Fremskrittspartiet)	1
Conservative Party (Høyre)	4
Centre Party (Senterpartiet)	3
Socialist Left Party (Sosialistisk Venstreparti)	1
Liberal Party (Venstre)	4
Total number of members:	17

Hamarøy kommunestyre 2011–2015
Party name (in Norwegian)	Number of representatives
Labour Party (Arbeiderpartiet)	6
Conservative Party (Høyre)	4
Centre Party (Senterpartiet)	2
Socialist Left Party (Sosialistisk Venstreparti)	1
Liberal Party (Venstre)	4
Total number of members:	17

Hamarøy kommunestyre 2007–2011
Party name (in Norwegian)	Number of representatives
Labour Party (Arbeiderpartiet)	7
Conservative Party (Høyre)	4
Centre Party (Senterpartiet)	3
Socialist Left Party (Sosialistisk Venstreparti)	1
Joint list of the Liberal Party and political independents (Samarbeidslista Venstre og partipolitisk uavhengige)	2
Total number of members:	17

Hamarøy kommunestyre 2003–2007
Party name (in Norwegian)	Number of representatives
Labour Party (Arbeiderpartiet)	3
Conservative Party (Høyre)	4
Centre Party (Senterpartiet)	4
Socialist Left Party (Sosialistisk Venstreparti)	2
Joint list of the Liberal Party and political independents (Samarbeidslista Venstre og partipolitisk uavhengige)	4
Total number of members:	17

Hamarøy kommunestyre 1999–2003
Party name (in Norwegian)	Number of representatives
Labour Party (Arbeiderpartiet)	6
Conservative Party (Høyre)	3
Centre Party (Senterpartiet)	4
Joint list of the Liberal Party and politically independent voters (Venstre og partipolitisk uavhengige velgere)	8
Total number of members:	21

Hamarøy kommunestyre 1995–1999
Party name (in Norwegian)	Number of representatives
Labour Party (Arbeiderpartiet)	6
Conservative Party (Høyre)	4
Centre Party (Senterpartiet)	5
Socialist Left Party (Sosialistisk Venstreparti)	1
Collaboration list (Samarbeidslista)	5
Total number of members:	21

Hamarøy kommunestyre 1991–1995
Party name (in Norwegian)	Number of representatives
Labour Party (Arbeiderpartiet)	6
Conservative Party (Høyre)	3
Centre Party (Senterpartiet)	6
Socialist Left Party (Sosialistisk Venstreparti)	2
Collaboration list (Samarbeidslista)	4
Total number of members:	21

Hamarøy kommunestyre 1987–1991
Party name (in Norwegian)	Number of representatives
Labour Party (Arbeiderpartiet)	9
Conservative Party (Høyre)	5
Christian Democratic Party (Kristelig Folkeparti)	1
Centre Party (Senterpartiet)	4
Socialist Left Party (Sosialistisk Venstreparti)	1
Liberal Party (Venstre)	1
Total number of members:	21

Hamarøy kommunestyre 1983–1987
Party name (in Norwegian)	Number of representatives
Labour Party (Arbeiderpartiet)	8
Conservative Party (Høyre)	5
Christian Democratic Party (Kristelig Folkeparti)	2
Socialist Left Party (Sosialistisk Venstreparti)	1
Joint list of the Centre Party (Senterpartiet) and the Liberal Party (Venstre)	5
Total number of members:	21

Hamarøy kommunestyre 1979–1983
Party name (in Norwegian)	Number of representatives
Labour Party (Arbeiderpartiet)	7
Conservative Party (Høyre)	7
Christian Democratic Party (Kristelig Folkeparti)	2
Centre Party (Senterpartiet)	3
Socialist Left Party (Sosialistisk Venstreparti)	1
Liberal Party (Venstre)	1
Total number of members:	21

Hamarøy kommunestyre 1975–1979
Party name (in Norwegian)	Number of representatives
Labour Party (Arbeiderpartiet)	6
Conservative Party (Høyre)	4
Christian Democratic Party (Kristelig Folkeparti)	2
Centre Party (Senterpartiet)	6
Hamarøy Free Voters (Hamarøy Frie Velgere)	3
Total number of members:	21

Hamarøy kommunestyre 1971–1975
Party name (in Norwegian)	Number of representatives
Labour Party (Arbeiderpartiet)	8
Conservative Party (Høyre)	5
Christian Democratic Party (Kristelig Folkeparti)	3
Centre Party (Senterpartiet)	5
Total number of members:	21

Hamarøy kommunestyre 1967–1971
Party name (in Norwegian)	Number of representatives
Labour Party (Arbeiderpartiet)	8
Conservative Party (Høyre)	6
Christian Democratic Party (Kristelig Folkeparti)	3
Centre Party (Senterpartiet)	4
Total number of members:	21

Hamarøy kommunestyre 1963–1967
Party name (in Norwegian)	Number of representatives
Labour Party (Arbeiderpartiet)	9
Conservative Party (Høyre)	7
Christian Democratic Party (Kristelig Folkeparti)	3
Centre Party (Senterpartiet)	5
Local List(s) (Lokale lister)	1
Total number of members:	25

Hamarøy herredsstyre 1959–1963
Party name (in Norwegian)	Number of representatives
Labour Party (Arbeiderpartiet)	9
Christian Democratic Party (Kristelig Folkeparti)	3
Joint List(s) of Non-Socialist Parties (Borgerlige Felleslister)	10
Local List(s) (Lokale lister)	3
Total number of members:	25

Hamarøy herredsstyre 1955–1959
Party name (in Norwegian)	Number of representatives
Labour Party (Arbeiderpartiet)	9
Christian Democratic Party (Kristelig Folkeparti)	4
Joint List(s) of Non-Socialist Parties (Borgerlige Felleslister)	12
Total number of members:	25

Hamarøy herredsstyre 1951–1955
Party name (in Norwegian)	Number of representatives
Labour Party (Arbeiderpartiet)	9
Christian Democratic Party (Kristelig Folkeparti)	4
Joint List(s) of Non-Socialist Parties (Borgerlige Felleslister)	11
Total number of members:	24

Hamarøy herredsstyre 1947–1951
Party name (in Norwegian)	Number of representatives
Labour Party (Arbeiderpartiet)	8
Christian Democratic Party (Kristelig Folkeparti)	7
Joint List(s) of Non-Socialist Parties (Borgerlige Felleslister)	9
Total number of members:	24

Hamarøy herredsstyre 1945–1947
Party name (in Norwegian)	Number of representatives
Labour Party (Arbeiderpartiet)	11
Christian Democratic Party (Kristelig Folkeparti)	5
Joint List(s) of Non-Socialist Parties (Borgerlige Felleslister)	8
Total number of members:	24

Hamarøy herredsstyre 1937–1941*
Party name (in Norwegian)	Number of representatives
Labour Party (Arbeiderpartiet)	11
Joint List(s) of Non-Socialist Parties (Borgerlige Felleslister)	9
Local List(s) (Lokale lister)	4
Total number of members:	24
Note: Due to the German occupation of Norway during World War II, no elections were held for new municipal councils until after the war ended in 1945.

=== Mayors ===
The mayor (Norwegian: ordfører) of Hamarøy Municipality was the political leader of the municipality and the chairperson of the municipal council. Here is a list of people who held this position:

- 1838–1838: Truls Krog Koch
- 1839–1856: Unknown
- 1857–1864: Nikolai Walsøe
- 1865–1869: Unknown
- 1870–1872: Rev. Fredrik Motzfeldt Raum Fladmark
- 1873–1874: Andreas Christian Olsen
- 1875–1877: Rev. Nicolaisen
- 1878–1879: Christen Christensen
- 1880–1886: Olaus Holter (H)
- 1887–1899: Andreas Nilsen (V)
- 1908–1910: Joakim E. Winther (V)
- 1911–1919: Johan Hoff Ellingsen (V)
- 1919–1937: Konrad Halmøy (V)
- 1937–1942: Sverre Pedersen (H)
- 1942–1943: Sverre Vaag (NS)
- 1943–1945: Sverre Pedersen
- 1945–1945: Bjarne Gaarder (H)
- 1945–1945: Nordahl Markussen (Ap)
- 1946–1947: Johan Stokland (H)
- 1947–1955: Arthur Thoresen (Ap)
- 1955–1959: Petter Fikke (H)
- 1959–1967: Ulrik Normann (H)
- 1967–1983: Olav Elsbak, Jr. (H)
- 1983–1991: Ingvald Sørensen (Ap)
- 1991–1995: Sverre Harald Eriksen (Sp)
- 1995–2003: May Valle (V)
- 2003–2007: Jan-Folke Sandnes (H)
- 2007–2015: Rolf Steffensen (Ap)
- 2015–2019: Jan-Folke Sandnes (H)
- 2019–present: Britt Kristoffersen Løksa (Sp)

== Transportation ==
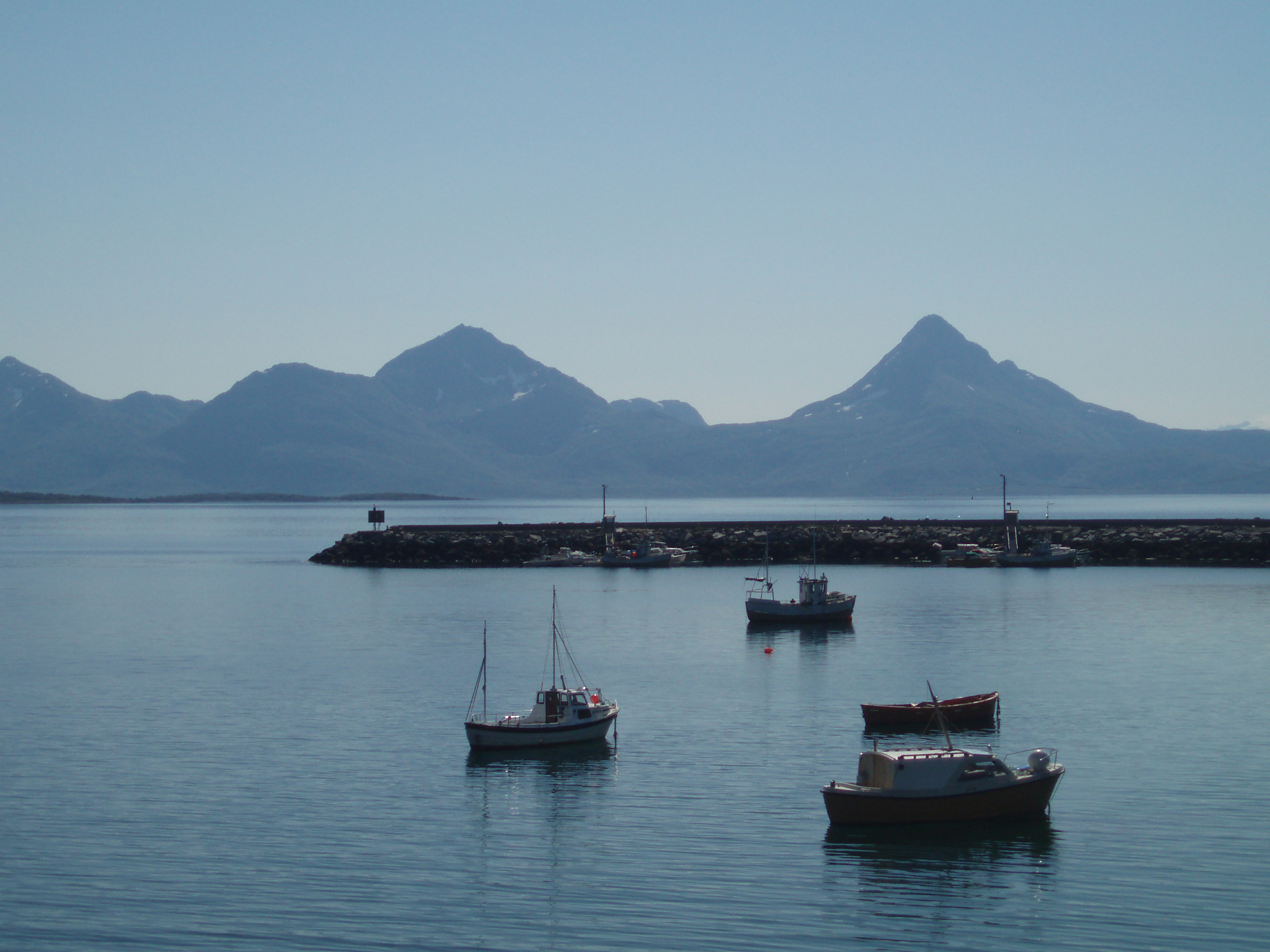
Skutvika, with ferry connection to Svolvær

While Hamarøy has a low population density, it sees some traffic during the summer months as the main road connection to Svolvær and the Lofoten islands runs through Hamarøy and its administrative centre, Oppeid. The ferry ride to Skrova and Svolvær is approximately 2 hours and departs from Skutvika (approximately 15 minutes from Oppeid) at regular intervals. In 2008, the ferry schedule was considerably reduced due to the new Lofoten Mainland Connection road. The European route E6 highway runs north and south through the municipality on its way to Narvik. Bus service by Stoklands Bilruter is available between certain villages in Hamarøy.

== Economy ==
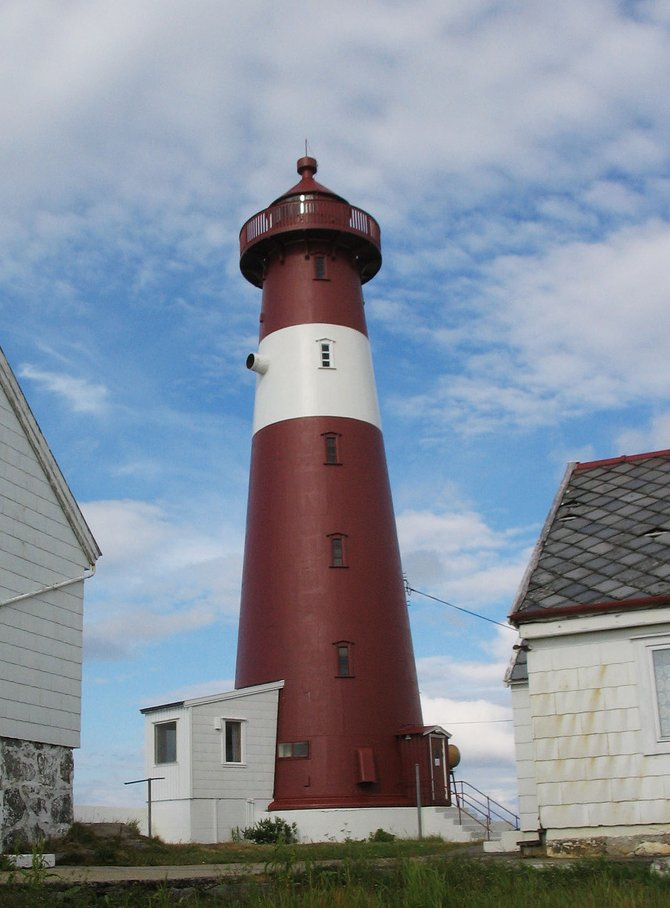
Tranøy Lighthouse

The municipal administration and other public services are located in Oppeid. There is a hotel in the municipality, as well as the scenic Tranøy Lighthouse which can be rented.

Skutvik is a small residential and marina area concentrated around the ferry dock. In the high season the number of cars and motor homes in line for the ferry can be significant. There are a few sights to see in Skutvik, as well as a small bar/cafe and a Statoil gas station.

== Knut Hamsun ==
The writer Knut Hamsun, winner of the 1920 Nobel Prize in Literature, grew up in Hamarøy. The Knut Hamsun Centre, a museum and educational center dedicated to Knut Hamsun's life and work, finished building in 2009 and opened for the public in June 2010. Knut Hamsun's childhood home is also open for visitors in summer. The Hamsun literature festival was founded in 1982 and takes place in Hamarøy during the first week of August every second year.

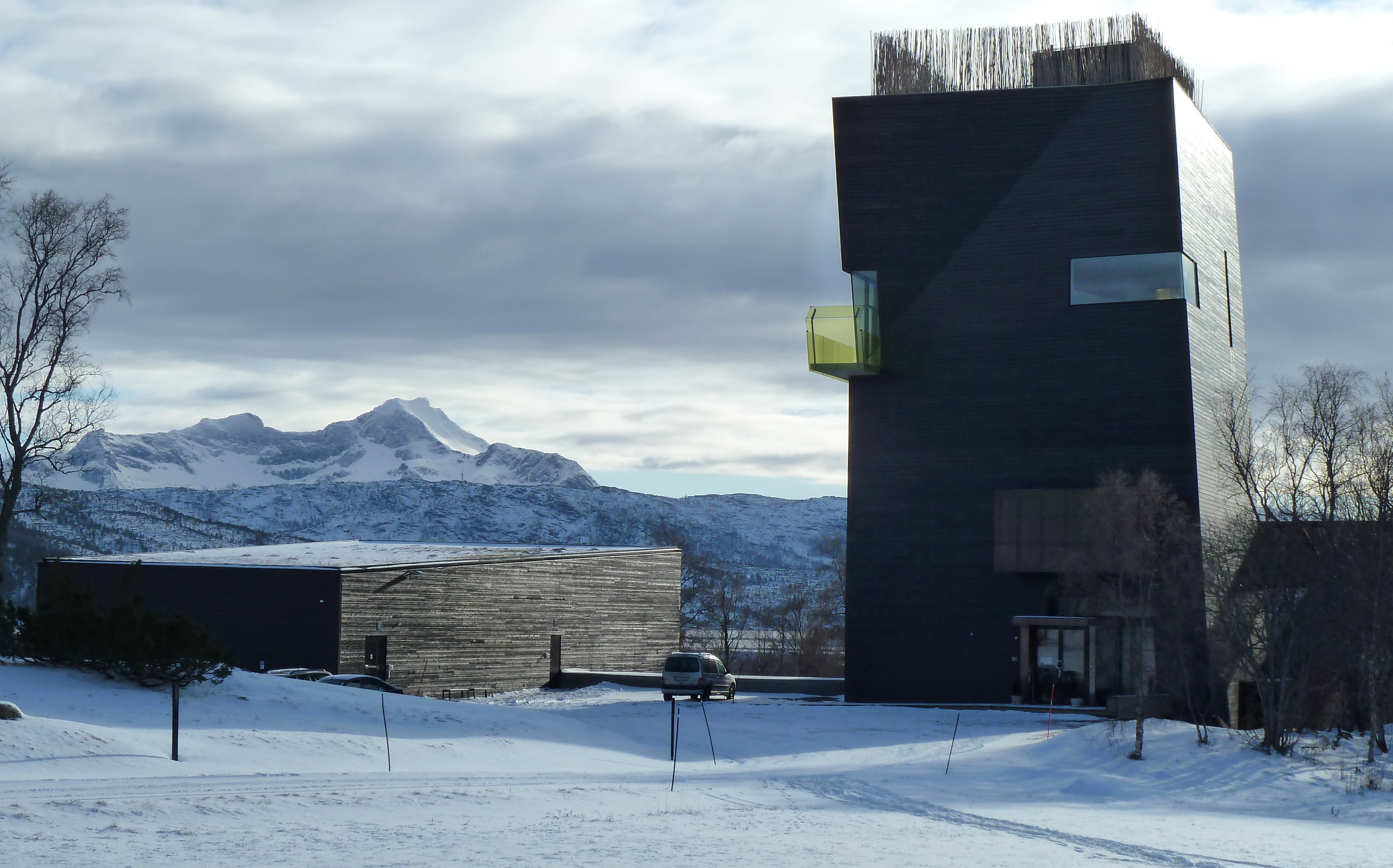
Knut Hamsun Centre

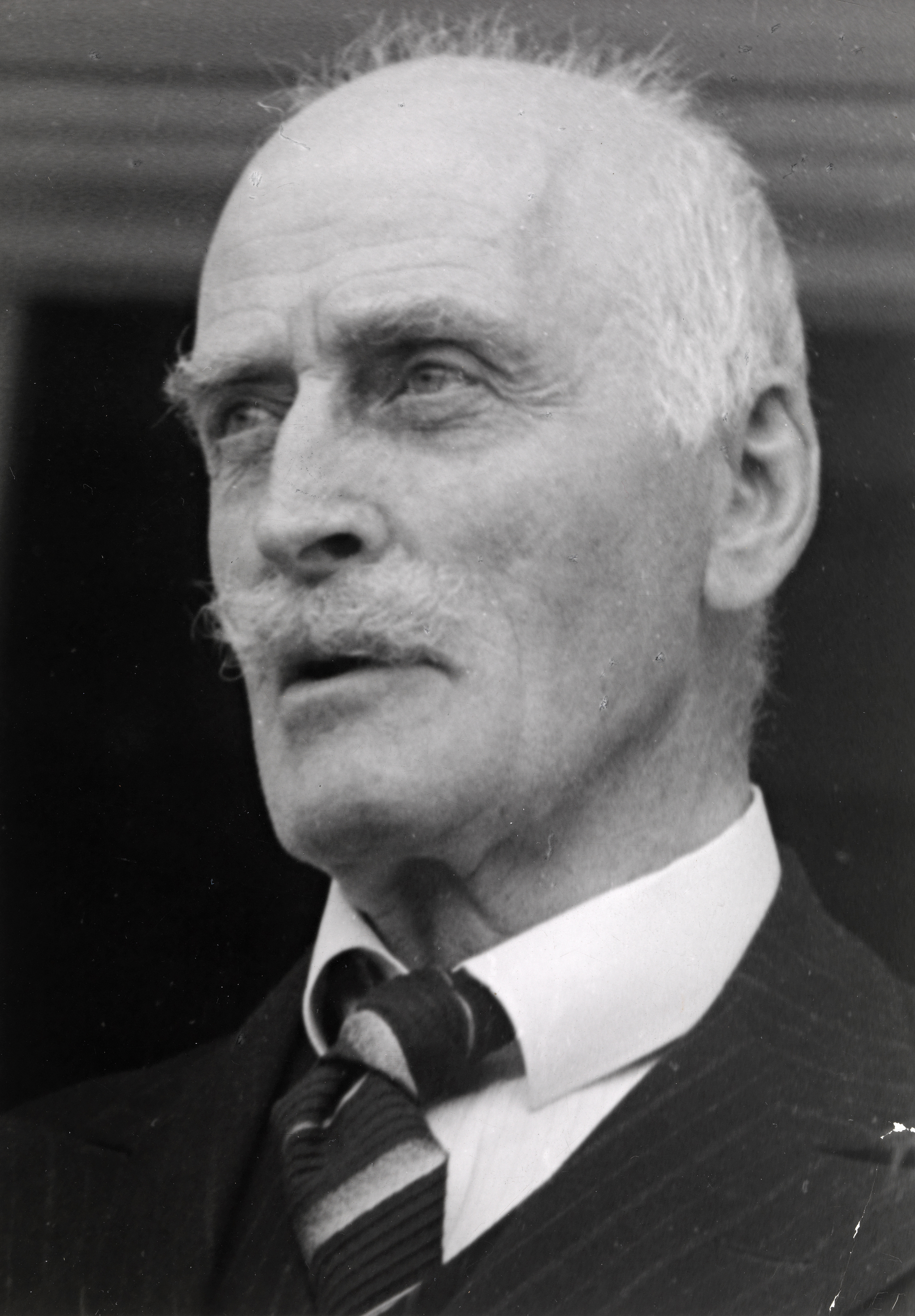
Knut Hamsun, 1939

== Notable people ==
- Knut Hamsun (1859–1952), a writer and winner of the Nobel Prize in Literature in 1920 who was brought up in Hamarøy
- Sigurd Johan Normann (1879 in Hamarøy — 1939), a theologian and Bishop for the Diocese of Hålogaland in Tromsø from 1937 to 1939
- Tore Hamsun (1912 in Hamarøy – 1995), a painter, writer, and publisher
- Horst Tappert (1923–2008), a German movie and TV actor who had a summer holiday cabin in Hamarøy
- Jack Berntsen (1940–2010), a philologist, songwriter, and folk singer who grew up in Hamarøy
