= Oppeid =

Village in Hamarøy Municipality, Norway

Oppeid (Norwegian); Badjesijdda (Lule Sami)
- Village
- Interactive map of: Oppeid (Norwegian); Badjesijdda (Lule Sami)
- Location within Nordland Location within Norway
- Coordinates: 68.0852°N 15.6094°E
- Country: Norway
- Region: Northern Norway
- County: Nordland
- District: Salten
- Municipality: Hamarøy Municipality

Area
  - Total: 0.68 km^{2} (0.26 sq mi)
- Elevation: 73 m (240 ft)

Population (2023)
  - Total: 557
  - Density: 819/km^{2} (2,120/sq mi)
- Time zone: UTC+01:00 (CET)
  - Summer (DST): UTC+02:00 (CEST)
- Post Code: 8294 Hamarøy

Oppeid (Norwegian) or Badjesijdda (Lule Sami) is the administrative centre of Hamarøy Municipality in Nordland county, Norway. The village is located about 90 kilometres (56 mi) southwest of the town of Narvik. It is located right next to the village of Presteid on a small isthmus of land between the Kaldvågfjorden and the Presteidfjorden. The village is home to the Knut Hamsun Upper Secondary School, a museum, and cafe.

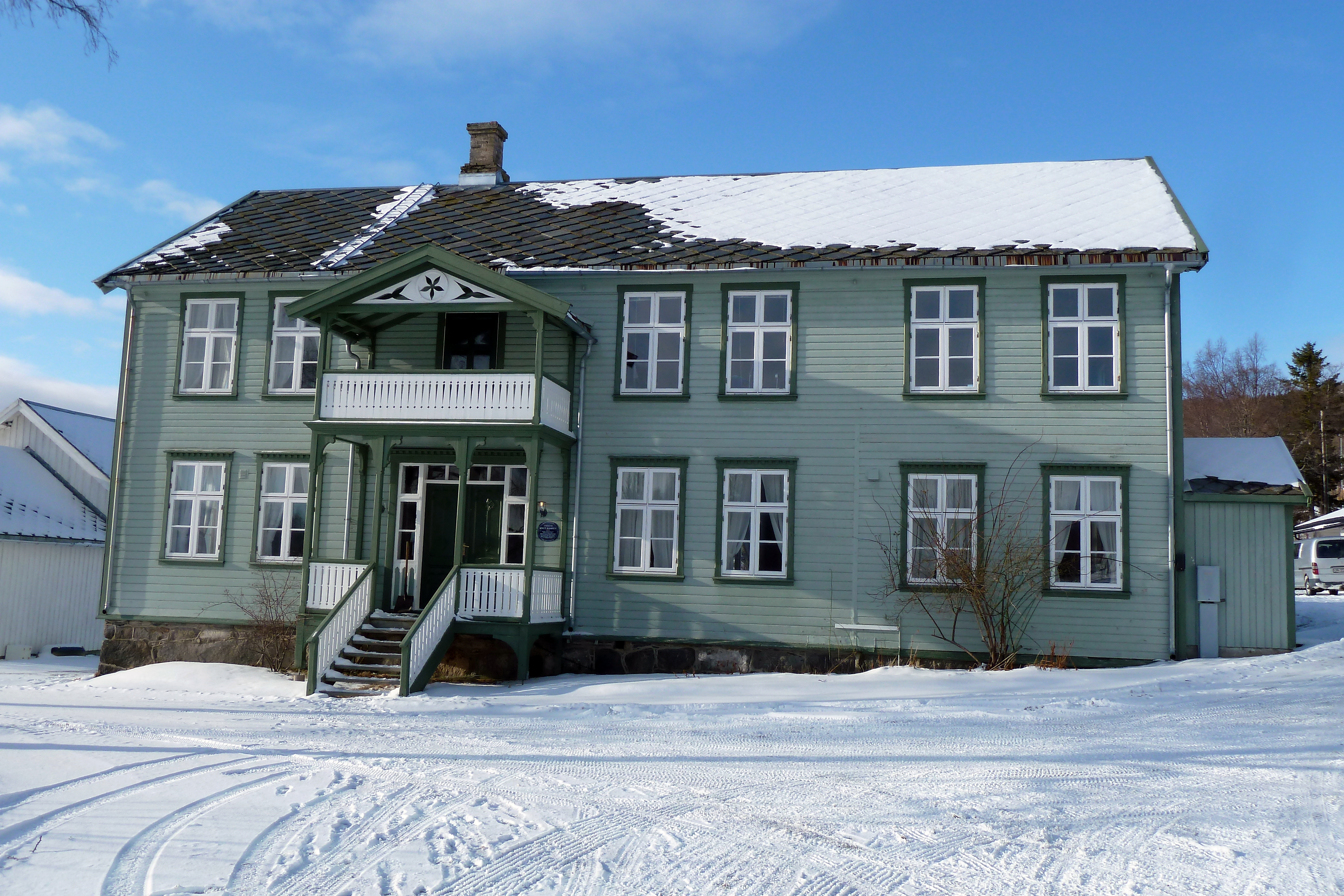
View of the Skogheim farm in Oppeid.

The 0.68-square-kilometre (170-acre) village has a population (2023) of 557 and a population density of 819 inhabitants per square kilometre (2,120/sq mi).
