= Lule Sámi =

Endangered Uralic language of Scandinavia

- julevsámegiella
- Native to: Norway, Sweden
- Ethnicity: Lule Sámi people
- Native speakers: 650 (2015)
- Language family: Uralic: Sámi; Western; Central; Lule–Pite; Lule Sámi
- Writing system: Latin

Official status
- Official language in: Norway
- Recognised minority language in: Sweden

Language codes
- ISO 639-2: smj
- ISO 639-3: smj
- Glottolog: lule1254
- ELP: Lule Saami
- Lule Sami language area (red) within Sápmi (grey)

- As of 2010, Lule Saami was classified as Severely Endangered by the UNESCO Atlas of the World's Languages in Danger

Lule Sámi (Lule Sami: julevsámegiella, Norwegian: lulesamisk, Swedish: lulesamiska) is a Uralic-Sámi language spoken around the Lule River in Sweden and in the northern parts of Nordland county in Norway. In Norway it is especially seen in Hamarøy Municipality (formerly Tysfjord Municipality), where Lule Sámi is one of the official languages. It is written in the Latin script, having an official alphabet.

== History ==
The language was originally only spoken around the Lule River, in Sweden. During the 18th century some Sámi migrated to Nordland in Norway, and their descendants still live in Norway, and speak Lule Sámi. The first book written in Lule Sámi, Hålaitattem Ristagasa ja Satte almatja kaskan, was published in 1839 by Lars Levi Læstadius.

== Status ==
With 650 speakers, Lule Sámi is nonetheless the second largest of all Sámi languages. It is reported that the number of native speakers is in sharp decline among the younger generations. The written language was standardised in 1983 and has seen revitalization efforts in the past few decades.

In Norway, the Árran Language Center aims to promote the learning and use of Lule Sámi.

== Phonology ==
=== Consonants ===
Some analyses of Lule Sámi phonology may include preaspirated stops and affricates (/hp/, /ht/, /ht͡s/, /ht͡ʃ/, /hk/) and pre-stopped or pre-glottalised nasals (voiceless /pm/, /tn/, /tɲ/, /kŋ/ and voiced /bːm/, /dːn/, /dːɲ/, /gːŋ/). However, these can be treated as clusters for the purpose of phonology, since they are clearly composed of two segments and only the first of these lengthens in quantity 3. The terms "preaspirated" and "pre-stopped" will be used in this article to describe these combinations for convenience.

		Labial	Dental	Alveolar	Postalveolar	Palatal	Velar
Nasal		m	n			ɲ	ŋ
Plosive / Affricate	voiceless	p	t	t͡s	t͡ʃ		k
Plosive / Affricate	voiced	b	d	d͡z	d͡ʒ	ɟ	ɡ
Fricative	voiceless	f		s	ʃ		h
Fricative	voiced	v					
Semivowel		v				j	
Lateral				l		ʎ	
Trill				r			

- Stops before a homorganic nasal (pre-stopped nasals) are realised as unreleased stops.
- /v/ is realised as a labiodental fricative [v] in the syllable onset (before a vowel), and as bilabial [w] in the syllable coda (in a consonant cluster).

=== Vowels ===
Lule Sámi possesses the following vowels:

	Short vowels		Long vowels		Diphthongs	
	Front	Back	Front	Back	Front	Back
Close	i	u	iː	uː	ie̯	uo̯
Mid	e	o	eː	oː	ea̯	oɑ̯
Open	a		aː			

- /ea̯/ can be realised as a true diphthong, or a long monophthong [ɛː].
- Long /eː/ and the diphthongs /ea̯/ and /oɑ̯/ occur only in stressed syllables.
- Long /iː/ and /uː/ are very rare, as is short /e/. They also only occur in stressed syllables.
- Short /o/ and long /oː/ can occur in unstressed syllables, but only when a preceding stressed syllable contains /o/.

==== Consonant length and gradation ====
Consonants, including clusters, that occur after a stressed syllable can occur in multiple distinctive length types, or quantities. These are conventionally labelled quantity 1, 2 and 3 or Q1, Q2 and Q3 for short. The consonants of a word alternate in a process known as consonant gradation, where consonants appear in different quantities depending on the specific grammatical form. Normally, one of the possibilities is named the strong grade, while the other is named weak grade. The consonants of a weak grade are normally quantity 1 or 2, while the consonants of a strong grade are normally quantity 2 or 3.

- Quantity 1 includes any single consonant. It originates from Proto-Samic single consonants in the weak grade.
- Quantity 2 includes any combination of consonants (including two of the same) with a short consonant in the coda of the preceding syllable. It originates from Proto-Samic single consonants in the strong grade, as well as combinations of two consonants in the weak grade.
- Quantity 3 includes any combination of consonants (including two of the same) with a long consonant in the coda of the preceding syllable. It originates from Proto-Samic combinations of two consonants in the strong grade.

Throughout this article and related articles, consonants that are part of different syllables are written with two consonant letters in IPA, while the lengthening of consonants in quantity 3 is indicated with an IPA length mark (ː).

Not all consonants can occur in every quantity type. The following limitations exist:

- Single /h/ is restricted to quantity 1, and does not alternate.
- Single /j/ is also restricted to quantity 1, but alternates with /ɟ/.
- Voiced stops and affricates only occur in quantity 3, except for /ɟ/ which can also occur in quantity 2.
- /ʎ/ occurs in quantity 2 and 3, but not in quantity 1.

When a consonant can occur in all three quantities, quantity 3 is termed "overlong".

=== Phonological processes ===
==== Umlaut ====
Umlaut is a process whereby a diphthong in a stressed syllable changes depending on the vowel in the next syllable.

The first type of umlaut causes an alternation between /ea̯/ and /ie̯/ in words whose stems end with unstressed /ie̯/. For such words, these two diphthongs can be considered variants of each other, while in words whose stems end with another vowel, these vowels remain distinct. The following table shows the different patterns that occur with different following vowels:

Second vowel	aː	uo̯	ie̯	a	u	i
Stem ends in /ie̯/	ea̯		ie̯	ea̯		ie̯
Stem ends in another vowel	ea̯		—	ea̯		
Stem ends in another vowel	ie̯		—	ie̯		

The second type of umlaut, called "diphthong simplification" or "monophthongization", is similar to its Northern Sami counterpart, but works differently. The diphthongs /ea̯/ and /oɑ̯/ become /eː/ and /oː/ respectively, if:

- The vowel in the next syllable is short (thus including also /a/), and
- The following consonant is quantity 1 or 2.

The diphthongs /ie̯/ and /uo̯/ are unaffected. The reverse process also occurs, turning the long vowels back into diphthongs if the consonant becomes quantity 3 or the vowel in the next syllable becomes long.

The third type of umlaut, progressive umlaut, works in the other direction. It causes the unstressed vowels /a/ and /aː/ to be rounded to /o/ and /oː/ respectively, if the preceding stressed vowel is short /o/.

==== Unstressed vowel lengthening ====
If a stressed syllable contains a short vowel followed by a single (quantity 1) consonant, then a short vowel in the following syllable is lengthened.

- dahkat "to do" ~ dagá (1st p. sg. present)
- bådnjåt "to twist" ~ bånjå̄ (1st p. sg. present)

== Dialects ==
Sammallahti divides Lule Sámi dialects as follows:

- Northern dialects: Sörkaitum, Sirkas and Jåkkåkaska in Sweden and Hamarøy in Norway
- Southern dialects: Tuorpon in Sweden
- Forest dialects: Gällivare and Serri in Sweden

Features of the northern dialects of Lule Sámi are:

- Long /aː/ is also rounded to /oː/ after /o/ in a first syllable.

Features of the southern dialects of Lule Sámi are:

- Umlaut of short /a/ to /e/ before /i/.

== Orthography ==
The orthography used for Lule Sámi is written using an extended form of the Latin script.

Letter	Phoneme(s)	Notes
A a	/a/	
Á á	/aː/	
B b	/p/, /b/	
D d	/t/, /d/	
E e	/eː/, /ie̯/	/ie̯/ when unstressed.
F f	/f/	
G g	/k/, /ɡ/	
H h	/h/	
I i	/i/	
J j	/j/	
K k	/k/, /kʰ/	Postaspirated at the beginning of a stressed syllable.
L l	/l/	
M m	/m/	
N n	/n/	
Ŋ ŋ	/ŋ/	
O o	/uo̯/	Only unstressed.
P p	/p/, /pʰ/	Postaspirated at the beginning of a stressed syllable.
R r	/r/	
S s	/s/	
T t	/t/, /tʰ/	Postaspirated at the beginning of a stressed syllable.
U u	/u/	
V v	/v/	
Å å	/o/, /oː/	
Ä ä	/ea̯/	
	/oɑ̯/	Only stressed.
	/e/	Only stressed.
	/iː/	
	/uː/	

Traditionally, the character ⟨Ń⟩ has been used to represent /ŋ/. In place of n-acute (available in Unicode and mechanical type writers, but not in Latin-1 or traditional Nordic keyboards), many have used ⟨ñ⟩ or even ⟨ng⟩. In modern orthography, such as in the official publications of the Swedish government and the translation of the New Testament published 2007, it is usually replaced with ⟨ŋ⟩, in accordance with the orthography of many other Sámi languages.

== Grammar ==
=== Cases ===
Lule Sámi has seven cases:

==== Nominative ====
Like the other Uralic languages, the nominative singular is unmarked and indicates the subject of a predicate. The nominative plural is also unmarked and is always formally the same as the genitive singular.

==== Genitive ====
The genitive singular is unmarked and looks the same as the nominative plural. The genitive plural is marked by a -j. The genitive is used:

- to indicate possession
- with prepositions
- with postpositions.

==== Accusative ====
The accusative is the direct object case and it is marked with -v in the singular. In the plural, its marker is -t, which is preceded by the plural marker -j.

==== Inessive ====
The inessive marker is -n in the singular and the plural, when it is then preceded by the plural marker -j. This case is used to indicate:

- where something is
- who has possession of something

==== Illative ====
The illative marker is -j in the singular and -da in the plural, which is preceded by the plural marker -i, making it look the same as the plural accusative. This case is used to indicate:

- where something is going
- who is receiving something
- the indirect object

==== Elative ====
The elative marker is -s in the singular and the plural, when it is then preceded by the plural marker -j. This case is used to indicate:

- where something is coming from

==== Comitative ====
The comitative marker in the singular is -jn and -j in the plural, which means that it looks like the genitive plural. The comitative is used to state with whom or what something was done.

=== Pronouns ===
The personal pronouns have three numbers – singular, plural and dual. The following table contains personal pronouns in the nominative and genitive/accusative cases.

	English	nominative	English	genitive
First person (singular)	I	mån	my	muv
Second person (singular)	you (thou)	dån	your, yours	duv
Third person (singular)	he, she	sån	his, her	suv
First person (dual)	we (two)	måj	our	munnu
Second person (dual)	you (two)	dåj	your	dunnu
Third person (dual)	they (two)	såj	theirs	sunnu
First person (plural)	we	mij	our	mijá
Second person (plural)	you	dij	your	dijá
Third person (plural)	they	sij	their	sijá

The next table demonstrates the declension of a personal pronoun he/she (no gender distinction) in various cases:

	Singular	Dual	Plural
Nominative	sån	såj	sij
Genitive	suv	sunnu	sijá
Accusative	suv	sunnuv	sijáv
Inessive	sujna	sunnun	siján
Illative	sunji	sunnuj	sidjij
Elative	sujsta	sunnus	sijás
Comitative	sujna	sunnujn	sijájn

=== Verbs ===
==== Person ====
Lule Sámi verbs conjugate for three grammatical persons:

- first person
- second person
- third person

==== Mood ====
Lule Sámi has five grammatical moods:

- indicative
- imperative
- optative (also known as "Imperative II")
- conditional
- potential

==== Grammatical number ====
Lule Sámi verbs conjugate for three grammatical numbers:

- singular
- dual
- plural

==== Tense ====
Lule Sámi verbs have two simple tenses:

- past
- non-past

and two compound tenses:

- Present perfect
- Pluperfect

==== Negative verb ====
Lule Sámi, like Finnish, the other Sámi languages, and some Estonian dialects, has a negative verb. In Lule Sámi, the negative verb conjugates according to tense (past and non-past), mood (indicative, imperative and optative), person (1st, 2nd and 3rd) and number (singular, dual and plural).

	Present indicative	Past indicative	Imperative	Optative
1st singular	iv	ittjiv	—	—
2nd singular	i	ittji	ale	allu
3rd singular	ij	ittjij	allis	allus
1st dual	en	ejma	allon	allun
2nd dual	ähppe	ejda	al'le	alluda
3rd dual	äbá	ejga	alliska	alluska
1st plural	ep	ejma	allop	allup
2nd plural	ehpit	ejda	allit	allut
3rd plural	e	ettjin	allisa	allusa

== Literature ==
- Grundström, Harald: Lulelappisches Wörterbuch
- Kintel, Anders 1991: Syntaks og ordavledninger i lulesamisk. Kautokeino : Samisk utdanningsråd.
- Spiik, Nils-Erik 1989: Lulesamisk grammatik. Jokkmokk: Sameskolstyrelsen. ISBN 91-7716-019-3
- Ylikoski, Jussi 2022. Lule Saami. In Marianne Bakró-Nagy and Johanna Laakso and Elena Skribnik (eds.), The Oxford guide to the Uralic languages, 130-146. Oxford: Oxford University Press.
- Wiklund, K.B. 1890: Lule-lappisches Wörterbuch. Helsinki: Suomalais-ugrilaisen seuran toimituksia; 1
