= Circles of latitude between the 65th parallel north and the 70th parallel north =

Circles of latitude

Following are circles of latitude between the 65th parallel north and the 70th parallel north. This includes the Arctic Circle, at 66°33′49.6″ north.

== 66th parallel north ==
66th parallel north (interactive map)

The 66th parallel north is a circle of latitude that is 66 degrees north of the Earth's equatorial plane, approximately 61 kilometres (38 mi) south of the Arctic Circle. It crosses the Atlantic Ocean, Europe, Asia and North America.

This latitude also roughly corresponds to the minimum latitude in which midnight sun can last all night near the summer solstice.

At this latitude midnight sun lasts from about 12 to 29 June, and the sun is visible for 2 hours, 47 minutes during the winter solstice. At midnight on the summer solstice, the altitude of the sun is 0.00°.

=== Around the world ===
Starting at the Prime Meridian and heading eastwards, the parallel 66° north passes through:

Coordinates	Country, territory or ocean	Notes
66°0′N 0°0′E	Atlantic Ocean	Norwegian Sea
66°0′N 11°50′E	Atlantic Ocean	Gåsværfjorden, Herøy, Norwegian Sea
66°0′N 12°0′E	Norway	Skerries of Steinan, Nordland
66°0′N 12°5′E	Atlantic Ocean	Oddfjorden, Norwegian Sea
66°0′N 12°8′E	Norway	Islands and skerries of Vardøya and Ytre Øksningan, Nordland
66°0′N 12°14′E	Atlantic Ocean	Øksningssundet, Norwegian Sea
66°0′N 12°16′E	Norway	Hestøya, Nordland
66°0′N 12°17′E	Atlantic Ocean	Hestøysundet, Norwegian Sea
66°0′N 12°18′E	Norway	Nord-Herøy, Nordland
66°0′N 12°21′E	Atlantic Ocean	Gautholet, Norwegian Sea
66°0′N 12°23′E	Norway	Hjartøya, Nordland
66°0′N 12°24′E	Atlantic Ocean	Alstenfjorden, Norwegian Sea
66°0′N 12°33′E	Norway	Alsta, Nordland
66°0′N 12°38′E	Atlantic Ocean	Leirfjorden, Norwegian Sea
66°0′N 12°42′E	Norway	Alsta, Nordland; passing just south of Sandnessjøen
66°0′N 12°54′E	Atlantic Ocean	Vefsnfjorden, Norwegian Sea
66°0′N 12°57′E	Norway	Mainland Nordland
66°0′N 14°33′E	Sweden	
66°0′N 24°2′E	Finland	
66°0′N 30°0′E	Russia	
66°0′N 34°37′E	Arctic Ocean	White Sea, Barents Sea
66°0′N 40°54′E	Russia	
66°0′N 179°45′W	Pacific Ocean	Gulf of Anadyr, Bering Sea
66°0′N 178°52′W	Russia	Chukchi Peninsula
66°0′N 170°11′W	Pacific Ocean	Bering Strait
66°0′N 166°58′W	United States	Alaska
66°0′N 141°0′W	Canada	Yukon; Northwest Territories – for ≈16 km Yukon – for ≈16 km Northwest Territories – for ≈9 km Yukon – for ≈8 km Northwest Territories – passing through Great Bear Lake; Nunavut
66°0′N 86°4′W	Arctic Ocean	Roes Welcome Sound, Hudson Bay
66°0′N 85°9′W	Canada	Nunavut – White Island
66°0′N 84°53′W	Arctic Ocean	Frozen Strait
66°0′N 84°22′W	Canada	Nunavut – Vansittart Island
66°0′N 83°52′W	Arctic Ocean	Foxe Basin
66°0′N 83°33′W	Canada	Nunavut – Nunaariatjuaq Island
66°0′N 83°30′W	Arctic Ocean	Foxe Basin
66°0′N 74°17′W	Canada	Nunavut – Baffin Island
66°0′N 67°0′W	Arctic Ocean	Cumberland Sound, Labrador Sea
66°0′N 65°57′W	Canada	Nunavut – Baffin Island
66°0′N 61°59′W	Arctic Ocean	Davis Strait
66°0′N 53°27′W	Greenland	Serfartooq
66°0′N 37°50′W	Atlantic Ocean	Sermilik, Denmark Strait
66°0′N 35°46′W	Greenland	Moroene
66°0′N 35°44′W	Atlantic Ocean	Denmark Strait
66°0′N 23°48′W	Iceland	Westfjords peninsula
66°0′N 20°29′W	Atlantic Ocean	Húnaflói
66°0′N 20°31′W	Iceland	Skagaströnd town on Skagi peninsula
66°0′N 19°56′W	Atlantic Ocean	Skagafjörður
66°0′N 19°41′W	Iceland	Tröllaskagi peninsula
66°0′N 18°47′W	Atlantic Ocean	Eyjafjörður by Dalvík town
66°0′N 18°18′W	Iceland	Flateyjarskagi og Fjörður peninsula
66°0′N 17°58′W	Atlantic Ocean	Skjálfandi
66°0′N 17°33′W	Iceland	Tjörnes by Húsavík, exiting by Langanes
66°0′N 14°38′W	Atlantic Ocean	Greenland Sea; Norwegian Sea

== 67th parallel north ==
67th parallel north (interactive map)

The 67th parallel north is a circle of latitude that is 67 degrees north of the Earth's equatorial plane, approximately 50 km north of the Arctic Circle. It crosses the Atlantic Ocean, Europe, Asia and North America.

At this latitude midnight sun lasts from approximately 2 June to 10 July, and the sun is visible for about 1 hour and 30 minutes during the winter solstice. At midnight on the summer solstice, the altitude of the sun is 0.85°.

If the latitude in the northern hemisphere is 67°45′ or smaller, every day in the month of March can view both astronomical dawn and astronomical dusk.

=== Around the world ===
Starting at the Prime Meridian and heading eastwards, the parallel 67° north passes through:

Coordinates	Country, territory or ocean	Notes
67°0′N 0°0′E	Atlantic Ocean	Norwegian Sea
67°0′N 12°12′E	Atlantic Ocean	Vestfjorden, Norwegian Sea
67°0′N 13°38′E	Atlantic Ocean	Fugløyfjorden, Norwegian Sea
67°0′N 13°52′E	Norway	Høgstjerna, Nordland
67°0′N 14°0′E	Atlantic Ocean	Sørfjorden, Norwegian Sea
67°0′N 14°3′E	Norway	Mainland Nordland
67°0′N 14°8′E	Atlantic Ocean	Morsdalsfjorden, Norwegian Sea
67°0′N 14°14′E	Norway	Mainland Nordland; passing just north of Røkland
67°0′N 16°16′E	Sweden	north of the Gulf of Bothnia
67°0′N 23°47′E	Finland	north of the Gulf of Bothnia
67°0′N 29°5′E	Russia	
67°0′N 32°33′E	Arctic Ocean	Kandalaksha Gulf, White Sea, Barents Sea
67°0′N 32°49′E	Russia	
67°0′N 41°20′E	Arctic Ocean	White Sea, Barents Sea
67°0′N 44°23′E	Russia	Kanin Peninsula
67°0′N 45°41′E	Arctic Ocean	Chosha Bay, Barents Sea
67°0′N 47°43′E	Russia	
67°0′N 71°55′E	Arctic Ocean	Gulf of Ob, Kara Sea
67°0′N 73°53′E	Russia	
67°0′N 172°28′W	Arctic Ocean	Chukchi Sea
67°0′N 162°51′W	United States	Alaska
67°0′N 141°0′W	Canada	Yukon; Northwest Territories - passing through the northernmost point of Great Bear Lake; Nunavut
67°0′N 81°36′W	Arctic Ocean	Foxe Basin
67°0′N 72°49′W	Canada	Nunavut - Baffin Island
67°0′N 62°2′W	Arctic Ocean	Davis Strait
67°0′N 53°40′W	Greenland	Russell Glacier; Passing just south of Cape Warming
67°0′N 33°44′W	Atlantic Ocean	Denmark Strait; Greenland Sea — passing just south of Kolbeinsey, Iceland (at 67°8′N 18°41′W); Norwegian Sea

== 68th parallel north ==
68th parallel north (interactive map)

The 68th parallel north is a circle of latitude that is 68 degrees north of the Earth's equatorial plane, in the Arctic. It crosses the Atlantic Ocean, Europe, Asia and North America.

At this latitude midnight sun lasts from about May 26th to July 16th, and civil polar twilight from about December 9th to January 3rd. At noon on the summer and winter solstices, the altitude of the sun is 45.45° and -0.7° respectively. At midnight on the summer solstice, the altitude of the sun is 1.76°.

This latitude is the boundary between the Southern and Arctic zones of Canada's National Topographic System, at which the longitude span of each map sheet doubles as one crosses this latitude going north.

=== Around the world ===
Starting at the Prime Meridian and heading eastwards, the parallel 68° north passes through:

Coordinates	Country, territory or ocean	Notes
68°0′N 0°0′E	Atlantic Ocean	Norwegian Sea
68°0′N 13°0′E	Norway	Moskenesøya, Lofoten, Nordland
68°0′N 13°17′E	Atlantic Ocean	Vestfjorden, Norwegian Sea
68°0′N 15°4′E	Norway	Engeløya, Nordland
68°0′N 15°7′E	Atlantic Ocean	Skagstadsundet, Norwegian Sea
68°0′N 15°4′E	Norway	Lundøya and Finnøya, and the mainland Nordland
68°0′N 13°17′E	Atlantic Ocean	Vestfjorden, Norwegian Sea
68°0′N 15°4′E	Norway	Engeløya, Lundøya and Finnøya, and the mainland Nordland
68°0′N 13°17′E	Atlantic Ocean	Vestfjorden, Norwegian Sea
68°0′N 15°6′E	Norway	Islands of Engeløya, Lundøya and Finnøya, and the mainland Nordland
68°0′N 17°1′E	Sweden	Norrbotten County (Lapland province)
68°0′N 17°48′E	Norway	Nordland, for about 5,8 km
68°0′N 17°56′E	Sweden	Norrbotten County (Lapland and Norrbotten provinces)
68°0′N 23°33′E	Finland	Lapland
68°0′N 29°25′E	Russia	Kola Peninsula, Murmansk Oblast
68°0′N 39°58′E	Arctic Ocean	White Sea
68°0′N 44°14′E	Russia	Kanin Peninsula, Nenets Autonomous Okrug
68°0′N 46°33′E	Arctic Ocean	Barents Sea
68°0′N 49°43′E	Russia	Nenets Autonomous Okrug; Komi Republic; Yamalo-Nenets Autonomous Okrug
68°0′N 73°6′E	Arctic Ocean	Gulf of Ob, Kara Sea
68°0′N 74°48′E	Russia	Yamalo-Nenets Autonomous Okrug
68°0′N 77°12′E	Arctic Ocean	Taz Estuary, Kara Sea
68°0′N 77°30′E	Russia	Yamalo-Nenets Autonomous Okrug; Krasnoyarsk Krai; Yakutia; Chukotka Autonomous Okrug
68°0′N 176°31′W	Arctic Ocean	Chukchi Sea
68°0′N 165°15′W	United States	Alaska
68°0′N 141°0′W	Canada	Yukon; Northwest Territories; Nunavut
68°0′N 115°7′W	Arctic Ocean	Coronation Gulf; Passing just north of the Couper, Berens and Lawford Islands; Passing just north of Hepburn Island; Passing just south of the Jameson Islands
68°0′N 110°9′W	Canada	Nunavut
68°0′N 110°0′W	Arctic Ocean	Bathurst Inlet
68°0′N 109°26′W	Canada	Nunavut - Chapman Islands
68°0′N 109°0′W	Arctic Ocean	Bathurst Inlet; Passing just north of Lewes Island; Fishers Island
68°0′N 107°53′W	Canada	Nunavut
68°0′N 103°17′W	Arctic Ocean	Queen Maud Gulf
68°0′N 98°59′W	Canada	Nunavut - O'Reilly Island, Klutschak Peninsula and Adelaide Peninsula
68°0′N 96°6′W	Arctic Ocean	Chantrey Inlet
68°0′N 95°25′W	Canada	Nunavut
68°0′N 88°20′W	Arctic Ocean	Committee Bay
68°0′N 86°48′W	Canada	Nunavut - Wales Island and Melville Peninsula
68°0′N 82°9′W	Arctic Ocean	Foxe Basin
68°0′N 77°2′W	Canada	Nunavut - Prince Charles Island, Air Force Island and Baffin Island
68°0′N 64°46′W	Arctic Ocean	Davis Strait
68°0′N 50°20′W	Greenland	Avannaata; Sermersooq
68°0′N 31°49′W	Atlantic Ocean	Greenland Sea; Norwegian Sea

== 69th parallel north ==
69th parallel north (interactive map)

The 69th parallel north is a circle of latitude that is 69 degrees north of the Earth's equatorial plane, in the Arctic. It crosses the Atlantic Ocean, Europe, Asia and North America, and passes through some of the southern seas of the Arctic Ocean.

At this latitude the midnight sun lasts from about May 20th to July 22nd, and civil polar twilight from about December 1st to January 11th. At noon on the summer and winter solstices, the altitude of the sun is 44.45° and -1.52° respectively. At midnight on the summer solstice, the altitude of the sun is 2.69°.

If the latitude in northern hemisphere is 69°48′ or smaller, every day in September can view both nautical dawn and dusk. Also, if the latitude in northern hemisphere is 69°10′ or smaller, every day in April can view both civil dawn and dusk.

=== Around the world ===
Starting at the Prime Meridian and heading eastwards, the parallel 69° north passes through:

Coordinates	Country, territory or sea	Notes
69°0′N 0°0′E	Atlantic Ocean	Norwegian Sea
69°0′N 15°0′E	Norway	Islands of Langøya, Andøya, Bjarkøya and Dyrøya, and the mainland Troms
69°0′N 20°9′E	Sweden	Norrbotten County (Lapland province); Passing 6.7 km south of the tripoint between Finland, Norway and Sweden
69°0′N 20°50′E	Finland	Lapland
69°0′N 22°6′E	Norway	Troms
69°0′N 25°44′E	Finland	Lapland
69°0′N 28°44′E	Russia	Kola Peninsula, Murmansk Oblast; Passing 5.8 km south of the tripoint between Finland, Norway and Russia; Passing northern parts of Murmansk
69°0′N 36°37′E	Arctic Ocean	Barents Sea
69°0′N 48°12′E	Russia	Island of Kolguyev, Nenets Autonomous Okrug
69°0′N 50°10′E	Arctic Ocean	Pechora Sea, Barents Sea
69°0′N 60°57′E	Russia	Yugorsky Peninsula, Nenets Autonomous Okrug; Yamalo-Nenets Autonomous Okrug
69°0′N 66°24′E	Arctic Ocean	Baydaratskaya Bay, Kara Sea
69°0′N 68°26′E	Russia	Yamal Peninsula, Yamalo-Nenets Autonomous Okrug
69°0′N 72°31′E	Arctic Ocean	Gulf of Ob, Kara Sea
69°0′N 74°5′E	Arctic Ocean	Taz Estuary, Kara Sea
69°0′N 76°58′E	Russia	Yamalo-Nenets Autonomous Okrug; Krasnoyarsk Krai; Yakutia; Chukotka Autonomous Okrug
69°0′N 169°24′E	Arctic Ocean	Chaunskaya Bay, East Siberian Sea
69°0′N 170°54′E	Russia	Chukotka Autonomous Okrug
69°0′N 179°56′E	Arctic Ocean	Chukchi Sea
69°0′N 163°54′W	United States	Alaska
69°0′N 141°0′W	Canada	Inuvialuit Settlement Region, Yukon
69°0′N 137°28′W	Arctic Sea	Mackenzie Bay, Beaufort Sea
69°0′N 136°7′W	Canada	Mackenzie River delta and mainland Northwest Territories; Nunavut
69°0′N 117°53′W	Arctic Sea	Dolphin and Union Strait
69°0′N 115°53′W	Canada	(unnamed peninsula) Nunavut
69°0′N 115°47′W	Arctic Sea	Dolphin and Union Strait
69°0′N 113°33′W	Canada	Victoria Island, Nunavut
69°0′N 107°24′W	Arctic Sea	Dease Strait
69°0′N 105°4′W	Canada	Victoria Island, Nunavut
69°0′N 101°48′W	Arctic Sea	Victoria Strait
69°0′N 100°36′W	Canada	Royal Geographical Society Islands, Nunavut
69°0′N 99°59′W	Arctic Sea	Alexandra Strait
69°0′N 99°31′W	Canada	King William Island, Nunavut
69°0′N 95°53′W	Arctic Sea	Rae Strait
69°0′N 94°21′W	Canada	(unnamed peninsula) Nunavut
69°0′N 90°40′W	Arctic Sea	Pelly Bay, Gulf of Boothia
69°0′N 90°9′W	Canada	(unnamed islands) Nunavut
69°0′N 89°54′W	Arctic Sea	Gulf of Boothia
69°0′N 89°42′W	Canada	Simpson Peninsula, Nunavut
69°0′N 88°30′W	Arctic Sea	Committee Bay, Gulf of Boothia
69°0′N 85°25′W	Canada	Islands off coast and mainland Melville Peninsula, Nunavut
69°0′N 81°30′W	Arctic Sea	Foxe Basin
69°0′N 79°18′W	Canada	Rowley Island, Nunavut
69°0′N 78°42′W	Arctic Sea	Foxe Basin
69°0′N 76°37′W	Canada	Baffin Island, Nunavut
69°0′N 68°0′W	Arctic Sea	Davis Strait
69°0′N 51°08′W	Greenland	Avannaata; Sermersooq
69°0′N 25°40′W	Atlantic Ocean	Greenland Sea; Norwegian Sea

=== Notable cities and towns on 69°N ===
- Cambridge Bay, Nunavut, Canada
- Tromsø, Troms, Norway
- Murmansk, Murmansk Oblast, Russia
- Norilsk, Krasnoyarsk Krai, Russia
- Pevek, Chukotka Autonomous Okrug, Russia

== 70th parallel north ==
70th parallel north (interactive map)

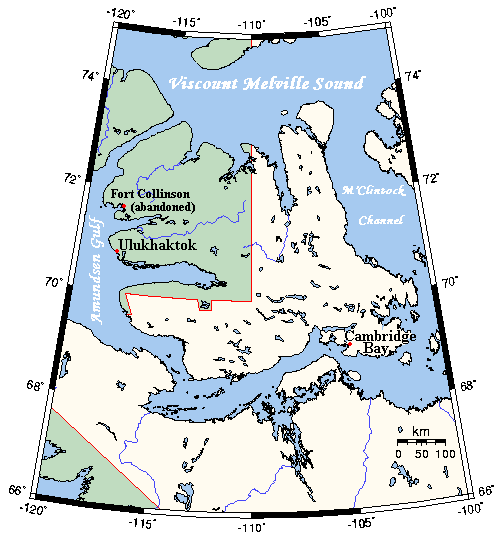
On Victoria Island, Canada, part of the border between Northwest Territories (green) and Nunavut (white) is defined by the 70th parallel north

The 70th parallel north is a circle of latitude that is 70 degrees north of the Earth's equatorial plane, in the Arctic. It crosses the Atlantic Ocean, Europe, Asia and North America, and passes through some of the southern seas of the Arctic Ocean.

At this latitude midnight sun lasts from about May 16th to July 27th, and civil polar twilight from November 25th to January 16th. At noon on the summer and winter solstices, the altitude of the sun is 43.45° and -3.04° respectively. At midnight on the summer solstice, the altitude of the sun is 3.64°.

=== Around the world ===
Starting at the Prime Meridian and heading eastwards, the parallel 70° north passes through:

Coordinates	Country, territory or sea	Notes
70°0′N 0°0′E	Atlantic Ocean	Norwegian Sea
70°0′N 18°40′E	Norway	Troms – islands of Rebbenesøya, Ringvassøy, Reinøya, Karlsøya and Kågen; mainland; island of Skorpa; mainland Finnmark (mainland)
70°0′N 27°22′E	Finland	Passing about 10.3 km (6.3 miles) south of the northernmost point of Finland, which is located at 70°05.537′N 27°57.335′E in the village of Nuorgam
70°0′N 28°2′E	Norway	Finnmark
70°0′N 29°30′E	Barents Sea	
70°0′N 58°44′E	Russia	Vaygach Island
70°0′N 60°12′E	Kara Sea	
70°0′N 66°56′E	Russia	Yamal Peninsula
70°0′N 72°30′E	Gulf of Ob	
70°0′N 73°45′E	Russia	
70°0′N 159°53′E	East Siberian Sea	
70°0′N 168°13′E	Russia	Ayon Island
70°0′N 168°31′E	East Siberian Sea	
70°0′N 170°35′E	Russia	
70°0′N 171°48′E	East Siberian Sea	
70°0′N 177°56′E	Chukchi Sea	
70°0′N 162°27′W	United States	Alaska
70°0′N 142°34′W	Beaufort Sea	
70°0′N 131°2′W	Canada	Northwest Territories – Tuktoyaktuk Peninsula
70°0′N 129°30′W	Beaufort Sea	
70°0′N 128°18′W	Canada	Northwest Territories – Cape Bathurst Peninsula
70°0′N 126°54′W	Amundsen Gulf	
70°0′N 125°12′W	Canada	Northwest Territories – Parry Peninsula
70°0′N 124°30′W	Amundsen Gulf	
70°0′N 117°22′W	Canada	On Victoria Island: – Northwest Territories – Northwest Territories / Nunavut border – Northwest Territories – Northwest Territories / Nunavut border – Nunavut
70°0′N 100°48′W	Victoria Strait	
70°0′N 98°50′W	Larsen Sound	Passing just north of King William Island, Nunavut, Canada
70°0′N 97°35′W	James Ross Strait	Passing just north of the Clarence Islands, Nunavut, Canada
70°0′N 96°17′W	Canada	Boothia Peninsula, Nunavut
70°0′N 92°1′W	Gulf of Boothia	
70°0′N 86°54′W	Canada	Nunavut – Crown Prince Frederik Island
70°0′N 86°27′W	Fury and Hecla Strait	
70°0′N 84°20′W	Canada	Nunavut – Baffin Island
70°0′N 81°9′W	Murray Maxwell Bay	
70°0′N 80°19′W	Canada	Nunavut – Baffin Island
70°0′N 78°39′W	Steensby Inlet	
70°0′N 77°41′W	Canada	Nunavut – Baffin Island
70°0′N 67°20′W	Baffin Bay	Northern limit of the Davis Strait
70°0′N 53°39′W	Greenland	Disko Island
70°0′N 52°30′W	Sullorsuaq Strait	
70°0′N 51°28′W	Greenland	Nuussuaq Peninsula
70°0′N 50°37′W	Torsukattak Fjord	
70°0′N 50°10′W	Greenland	Sermeq Kujalleq
70°0′N 27°20′W	Gaasefjord	
70°0′N 25°15′W	Greenland	Geikie Plateau
70°0′N 22°18′W	Arctic Ocean	Greenland Sea; Norwegian Sea

== See also ==
- Circles of latitude between the 60th parallel north and the 65th parallel north
- Circles of latitude between the 70th parallel north and the 75th parallel north
- Arctic Circle
