= Heinrich Klutschak =

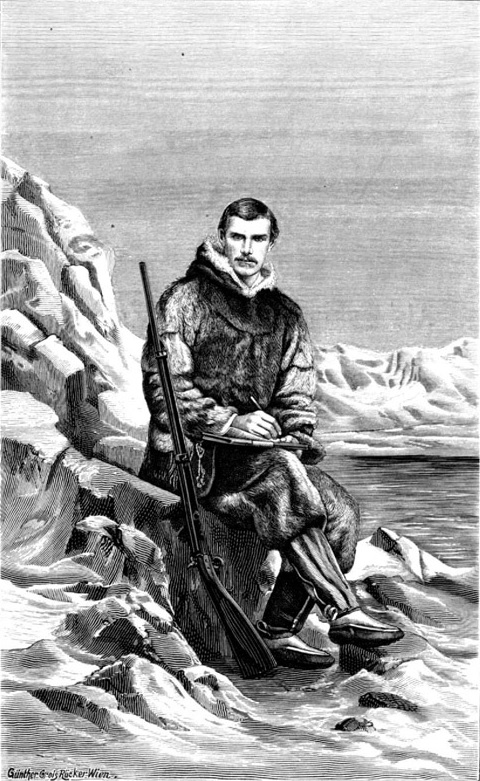
A sketch of Heinrich Klutschak

Heinrich Wenzel Klutschak (3 May 1848 – 26 March 1890) was an Austrian-American engineer, artist, naturalist, writer, and explorer. He travelled to the Arctic and Southern Atlantic, visiting Repulse Bay, Nunavut in 1871 and South Georgia in 1877. He served as a part of Frederick Schwatka's 1878–1880 Arctic expedition to uncover information about the lost 1845 Franklin Expedition. He wrote and provided illustrations of his voyages, and provided one of the earliest reliable Western accounts of the Aivilingmiut, Utkuhikhalingmiut, and Netsilingmiut Inuit.

== Early life and travels ==
Heinrich Klutschak was born 3 May 1848 in Prague, Austrian Empire (modern day Czech Republic). His father was Franz Klutschak, the editor-in-chief and owner of the magazine Bohemia as well the editor for many other Czech and German language magazines and journals. Heinrich Klutschak simultaneously studied engineering at the German Technical University and at the Artillery College. He was subsequently posted to the First Artillery Regiment of the Austrian (later Austro-Hungarian) army on 15 May 1866. He stayed with the regiment until he was discharged on 7 June 1871, after which he emigrated to the United States.

=== Repulse Bay ===
Immediately after emigrating to the United States, Klutschak joined a New London whaler on a voyage to Repulse Bay in the Canadian Arctic, where he first became acquainted with the Aivilingmiut and may have learned some Inuktitut.

=== South Georgia ===
A sealing expedition to South Georgia was undertaken by William Dunbar aboard the schooner Flying Fish in 1877. Klutschak joined the ship in Cape Verde. The process of joining was unusual: Flying Fish sailed openly in the daylight hours, but at night a boat was lowered to swimming distance so that the recruits could swim out and join without officially signing up for military service.

The vessel eventually sighted the Shag Rocks on 22 September 1877. Dunbar landed the crew on the Northwest coast of South Georgia, and they progressed in an anti-clockwise voyage around the island, killing elephant seals to render oil from their blubber. Klutschak used the opportunity to write and publish a detailed account of the island. He was a critic of the practice of sealing, arguing it was cruel, wasteful, and unsustainable, and he particularly found the killing of mother seals distasteful due to it leaving the young to die.

As a naturalist, he also provided descriptions of the local birdlife, with a focus on penguins and albatrosses, both of which he described fondly and not scared of people. He also described the effect of the Allardyce Range on the meteorology of the island, providing more accurate descriptions than had existed at the time. His map of South Georgia was the fourth ever made, after those of James Cook, Isaac Pendleton, and Fabian Gottlieb von Bellinghausen.

=== Frederick Schwatka's Polar Expedition ===
==== Background ====
Under the sponsorship of the American Geographical Society, American army lieutenant Frederick Schwatka was to command an expedition for the purpose of retrieving books and records that the whaler Thomas Barry had alleged were located in a cairn on an island in the Gulf of Boothia, which were believed to be records from the lost Franklin Expedition. Barry had been writing in a journal when Inuit were exchanging Franklin relics with Captain Potter of the whaler Glacier, when one of the Inuit remarked the journal was very much like the ones put in cairns by the white men who starved to death on King William Island. Schwatka, who had volunteered to be in command of the expedition, was joined by journalist William H. Gilder with the backing of James Gordon Bennett, editor of the New York Herald, and by Ipirvik ("Joe Ebierbing"), an Inuk guide and translator with indispensable knowledge of the region who at the time was living in Groton, Connecticut. Klutschak was selected by the American Geographical Society for his existing arctic experience and artistic skill, while the last selected member, Frank E. Melms, was chosen for his experienced seamanship.

==== Expedition ====
Schwatka, Gilder, Ipirvik, Klutschak, and Melms landed on Depot Island in the northern Hudson Bay aboard the schooner Eothen on 7 August 1878, at about four o'clock in the afternoon, shortly before a storm. The first task the party engaged in was to find Barry's witnesses and then Captain Potter at Repulse Bay, the former of whom could not be found and the latter of whom claimed he only heard Barry's story after it was published, suggested Barry had stolen the spoon, and that the story was fabricated. Klutschak personally believed Barry's story to be entirely false. Despite the purpose of the expedition being called into doubt, the group continued on.

Schwatka knew that success meant fully adopting the customs and procedures of the Inuit, including clothing, diet, and life-style, a sentiment that Klutschak agreed with. Fourteen to sixteen Inuit supported the group, who learned how to adopt to their lifestyle and undertake activities that accurately mirrored them.

The sledge haul to Cape Felix on the northern tip of King William Island and back was one of the longest ever undertaken, and was conducted in some of the coldest weather ever recorded on an arctic expedition. On 27 June 1879, Klutschak and Melms found the skeletal remains of a European man, which has since been identified as John Irving, a lieutenant aboard HMS Terror, by a second mathematical prize bearing his name found at the grave. Schwatka recovered the remains and returned them to Scotland, where they were interred.

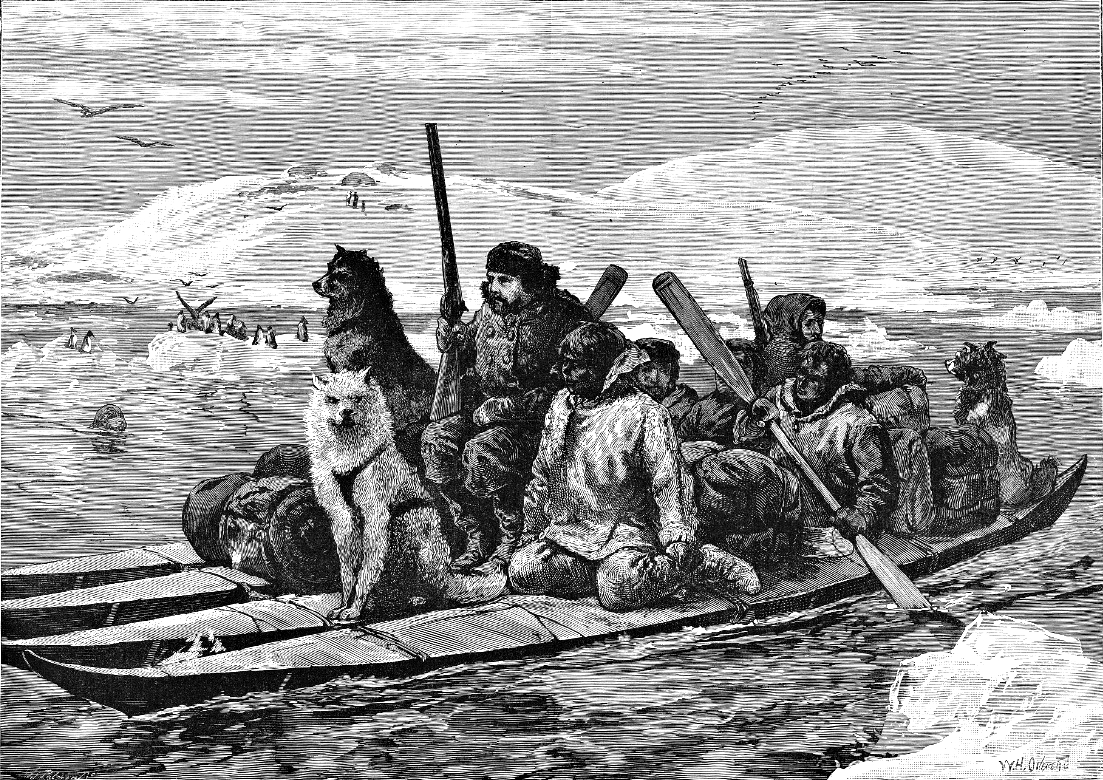
Heinrich Klutschak: The American Franklin Search Expedition: Crossing Simpson's Strait in kayaks (The Illustrated London News, January 8, 1881).

The party divided in two on 7 July 1879, with Klutschak and Melms heading to search the coast to the southeast, then to cross Simpson Strait, and eventually to continue on to the Adelaide Peninsula. They found no evidence of Franklin's men, and instead researched the Inuit technique of salmon fishing.

On the return voyage, the reunited party stopped at a spot on the mainland where accounts suggest between ten and thirty Franklin Expedition men died. Schwatka named the place Starvation Cove while Klutschak remarked on the desolation of the spot, believing it was the last place any of the men made it to.

==== Writings and lectures ====
Following the Schwatka expedition, Klutschak published a book called Als Eskimo unter den Eskimos (As an Eskimo among the Eskimos) and sustained himself on the Austrian and German lecture circuit. Austrian Emperor Franz Josef attended one of the lectures and was so moved by Klutschak that he presented him with a medal.

== Later life and death ==
Despite his successes in Germany and Austria, Klutschak's return to New York saw him having to scrape by taking various jobs including clerk, private secretary, and errand boy, mostly working with whaling companies. He suffered from tuberculosis in his final years, and though his influential friends in the American Geographical Society, including Chief Justice Charles P. Daly negotiated his admission into a sailor's home on Staten Island in January 1890, he waited until March to move in, when a heavy snowstorm forced him back to his room at 320 Broome Street. He died there, aged 42 and penniless, on 26 March 1890. His friends in New York covered the cost of the funeral.

== Legacy ==
Klutschak Point, a rocky point southeast of Cape Demidov on the southern coast of South Georgia, is named after him. There is also a Klutschak Peninsula in Nunavut, west of Adelaide Peninsula and east of Queen Maud Gulf.
