= Hamarøy Church =

- Hamarøy kirke Hábmera girkko
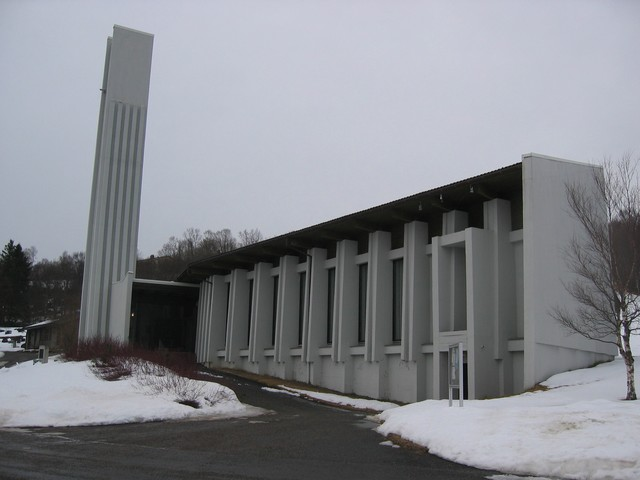
- View of the church
- Hamarøy Church
- 68.0840306°N 15.638653°E
- Location: Hamarøy Municipality, Nordland
- Country: Norway
- Denomination: Church of Norway
- Churchmanship: Evangelical Lutheran

History
- Status: Parish church
- Founded: 14th century
- Consecrated: 16 June 1974

Architecture
- Functional status: Active
- Architect: Nils Toft
- Architectural type: Fan-shaped
- Completed: 1974 (52 years ago)

Specifications
- Capacity: 400
- Materials: Concrete

Administration
- Diocese: Sør-Hålogaland
- Deanery: Ofoten prosti
- Parish: Hamarøy
- Norwegian Cultural Heritage Site
- Type: Church
- Status: Not protected
- ID: 84472

Hamarøy Church (Norwegian: Hamarøy kirke or Northern Sami: Hábmera girkko) is a parish church of the Church of Norway in Hamarøy Municipality in Nordland county, Norway. It is located in the village of Presteid. It is the church for the Hamarøy parish which is part of the Ofoten prosti (deanery) in the Diocese of Sør-Hålogaland. The white, modern, concrete church was built in a fan-shaped style in 1974 using plans drawn up by the architect Nils Toft. The church seats about 400 people.

== History ==
Hamarøy Church is located on an old church site. The earliest existing historical records of the church date back to 1589, but the building was not new at that time. The old stave church was torn down in 1655 and replaced with a new building on the same site, about 50 metres (160 ft) south of the present church site. It was a timber-framed cruciform design. In 1771, the church was inspected and described as "dilapidated", so planning began for a new replacement church. In 1775, the old church was torn down and a new cruciform church was constructed on the same site.

In 1814, this church served as an election church (Norwegian: valgkirke). Together with more than 300 other parish churches across Norway, it was a polling station for elections to the 1814 Norwegian Constituent Assembly which wrote the Constitution of Norway. This was Norway's first national elections. Each church parish was a constituency that elected people called "electors" who later met together in each county to elect the representatives for the assembly that was to meet at Eidsvoll Manor later that year.

In 1840, the church was renovated, including a new tower on the roof and a new sacristy. By royal decree on 28 October 1882, it was ordered to demolish Hamarøy's old church and build a new church with 700 seats on a site further to the north. So, in 1885, a new church was built about 50 metres (160 ft) to the north of the old church. Another royal decree from 19 September 1885, ordered that after the new church was completed, the old church was taken down and moved to the village of Karlsøy on the nearby island of Finnøya where it was rebuilt and is now known as the Sagfjord Church. In October 1969, Hamarøy Church burned down after a lightning strike. The present church was completed in 1974 on the same site as the previous building.

== Media gallery ==
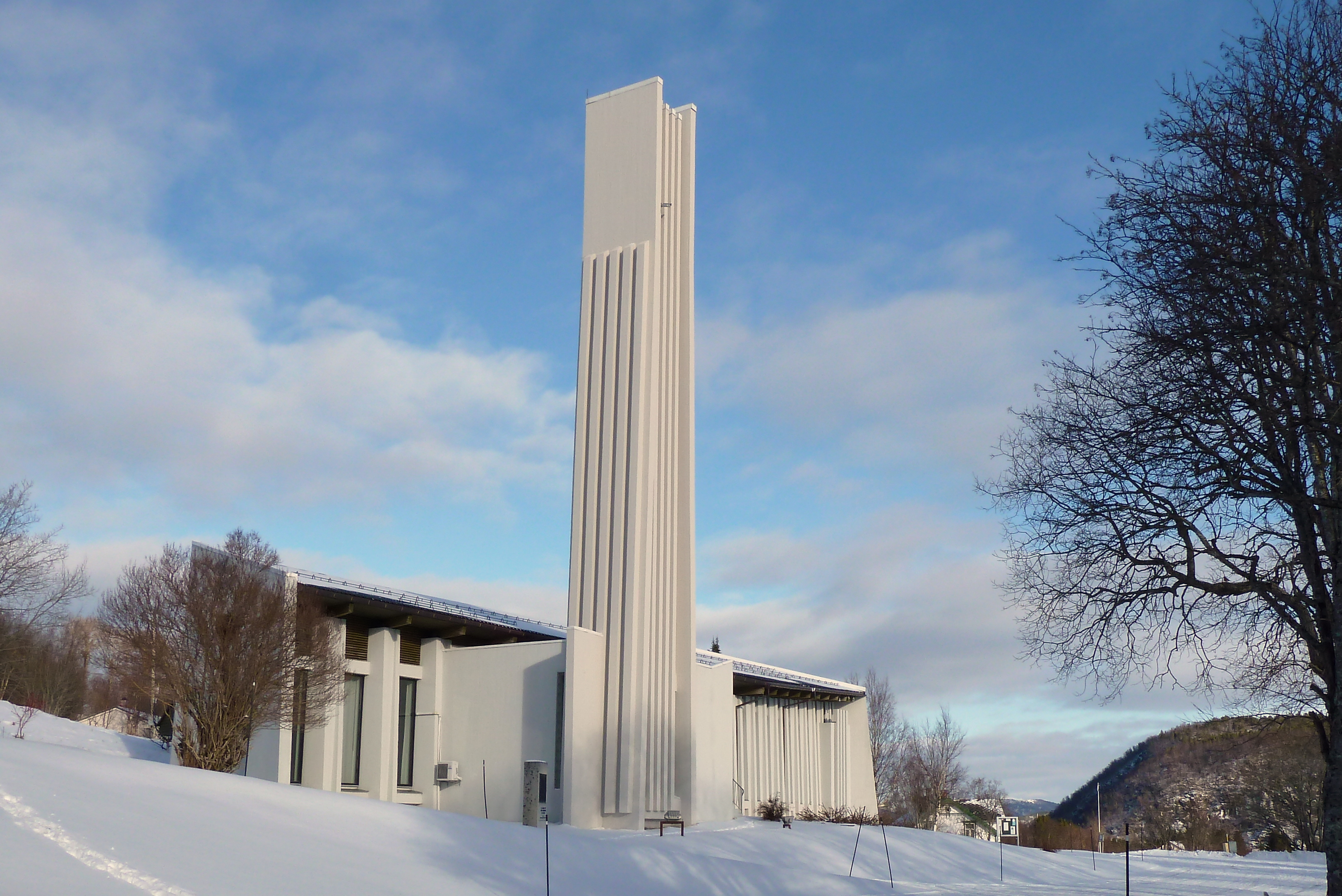

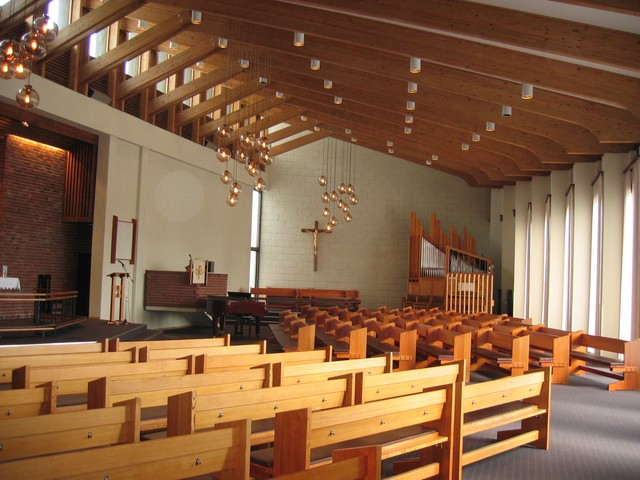

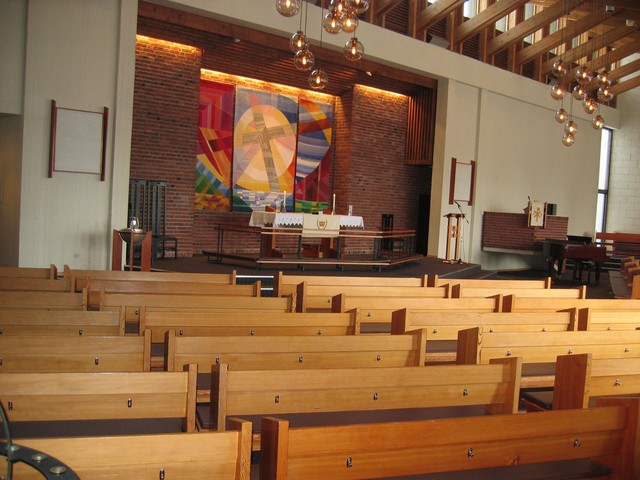

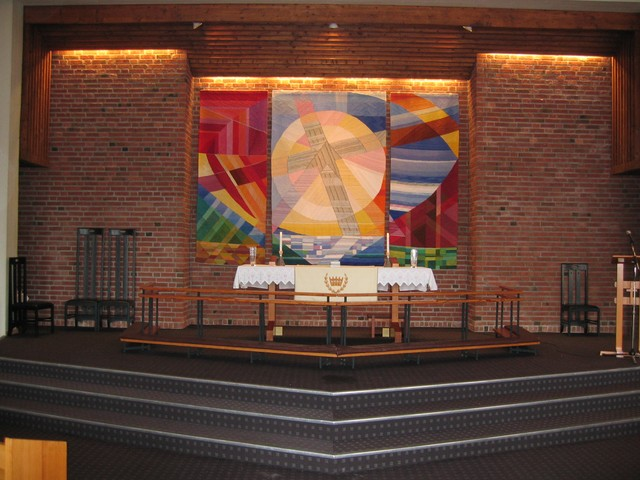

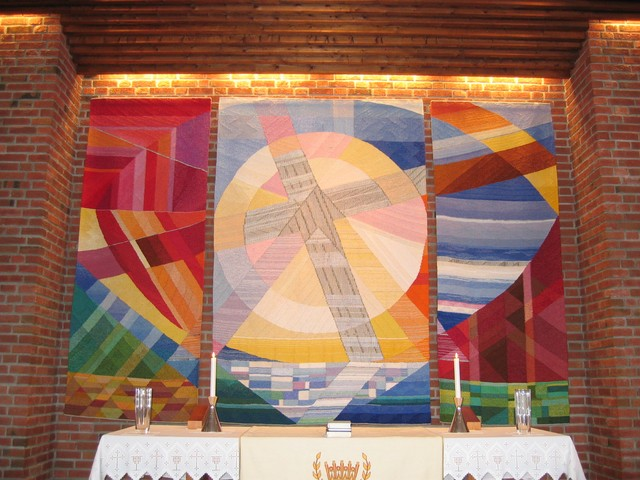

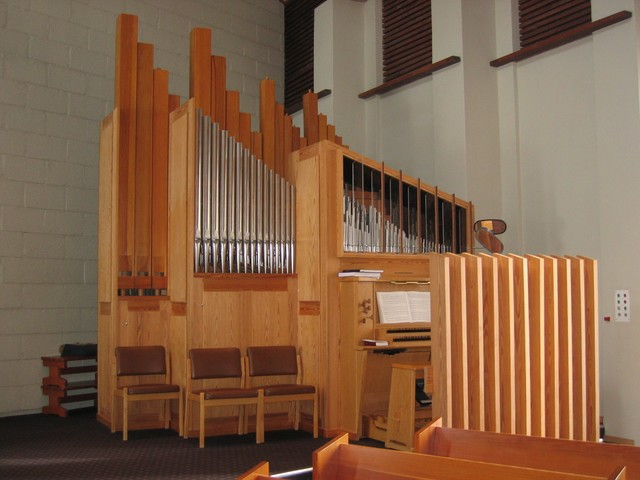

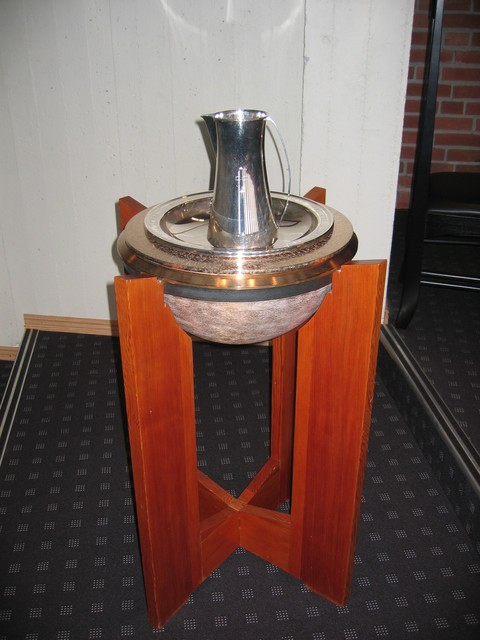

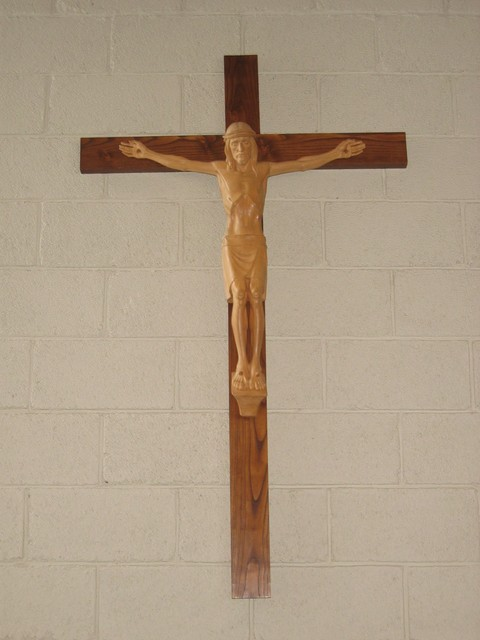

== See also ==
- List of churches in Sør-Hålogaland
