= Veggfjellan =

Mountain in Nordland, Norway

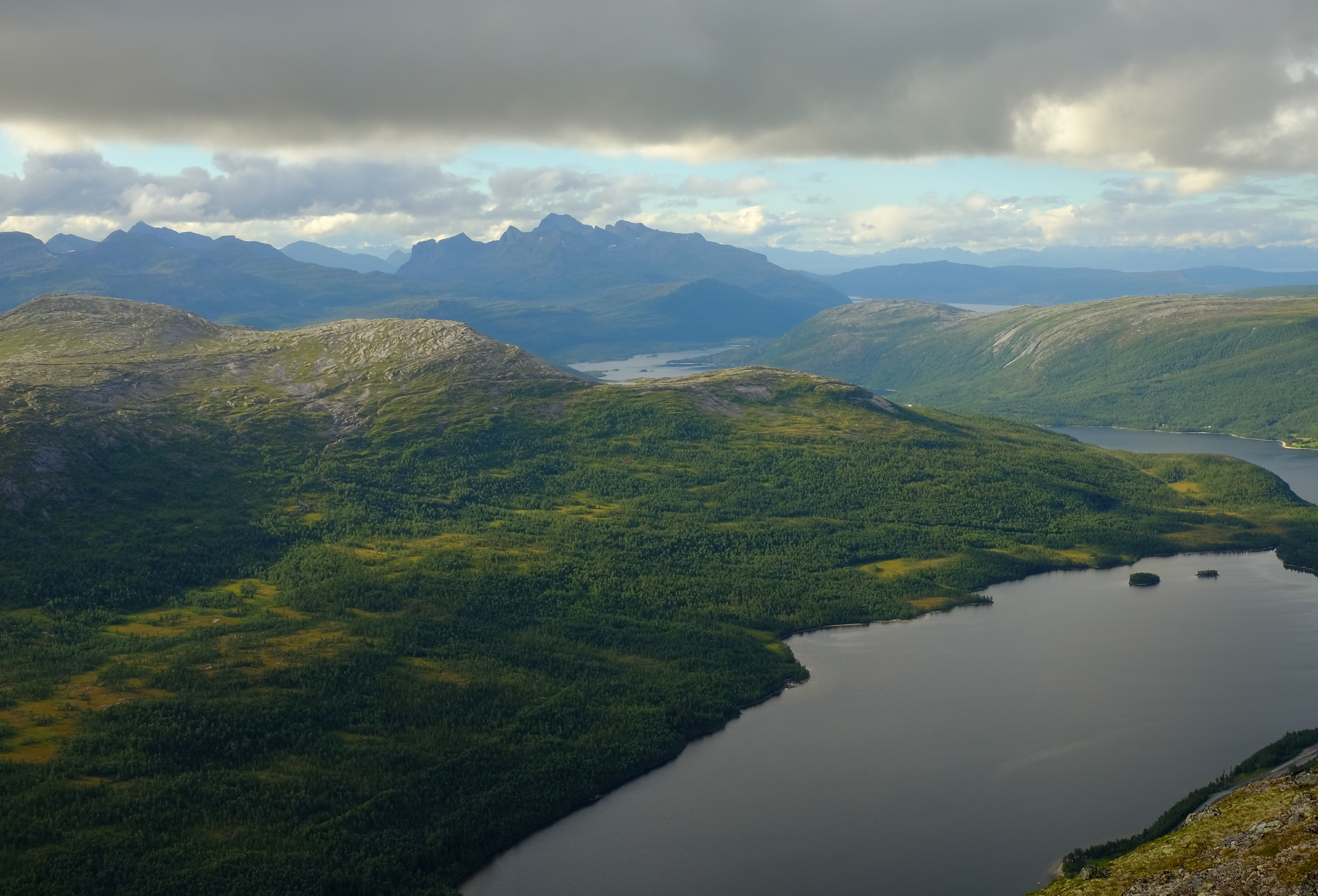
- View of Veggfjellan from Kråkmo Mountain

Highest point
- Elevation: 1,046 m (3,432 ft)
- Prominence: 125 m (410 ft)
- Parent peak: Litl Forra
- Isolation: 1.4 km (0.87 mi)
- Coordinates: 67°56′13″N 15°45′16″E

Naming
- English translation: "Wall Mountain"

Geography
- Interactive map of the mountain
- Location: Nordland, Norway
- Parent range: Scandinavian Mountains

Veggfjellan is a mountain in Nordland county, Norway. The 1,046-metre (3,432 ft) tall mountain is located about 6 kilometres (3.7 mi) northwest of the village of Tømmerneset. The mountain peak is located on the border of Hamarøy Municipality and Steigen Municipality, just north of the Steigen Tunnel which runs through the interior of the mountain. The Sagfjorden passes by to the north of the mountain.

== Etymology ==
"Fjell" means mountain, while "Vegg" means wall. So, the mountain translates to "Wall Mountain" in Norwegian.

== Geography ==
Veggfjellan is located within the Scandinavian Mountains in far northern Nordland county in Norway. It is relatively low for a mountain, at less than 1,000 meters.

=== Climate ===
The mountain is well within the subarctic (Dfc) climate zone, with only two months averaging above 10 C (50 F), three months averaging at or below -3 C (27 F), and five months averaging at or below 0 C (32 F). This is abnormally cold for Nordland, but the elevation may play a part in this mountain's climate. Snow is common in winter, averaging 84 days per year, with January, February and March averaging two weeks in terms of snow days, and the summer months plus June averaging none.

The climate, though cold for Norway, is still very moderated (and with somewhat less snow) compared to cities at the same latitude line (Kaktovik, Alaska; Inuvik, Northwest Territories, Canada), and even much further south (Kuujjuaq, Quebec, Canada; Harbin, Manchuria, China), due to Gulf Stream moderation that turns places like Kristiansund, Bergen, and Molde, Norway to temperate Cfb's.

Climate data for Veggfjellan
Month	Jan	Feb	Mar	Apr	May	Jun	Jul	Aug	Sep	Oct	Nov	Dec	Year
Record high °C (°F)	8 (46)	8 (46)	11 (52)	18 (64)	29 (84)	30 (86)	32 (90)	30 (86)	23 (73)	18 (64)	13 (55)	9 (48)	32 (90)
Mean daily maximum °C (°F)	−1 (30)	−1 (30)	1 (34)	4 (39)	8 (46)	12 (54)	16 (61)	16 (61)	12 (54)	6 (43)	2 (36)	0 (32)	6 (43)
Daily mean °C (°F)	−3 (27)	−4 (25)	−2 (28)	1 (34)	5 (41)	9 (48)	13 (55)	13 (55)	9 (48)	4 (39)	0 (32)	−3 (27)	3 (37)
Mean daily minimum °C (°F)	−6 (21)	−6 (21)	−5 (23)	−2 (28)	2 (36)	7 (45)	11 (52)	10 (50)	7 (45)	2 (36)	−2 (28)	−5 (23)	1 (34)
Record low °C (°F)	−23 (−9)	−24 (−11)	−22 (−8)	−14 (7)	−5 (23)	1 (34)	5 (41)	1 (34)	−5 (23)	−12 (10)	−19 (−2)	−26 (−15)	−26 (−15)
Average rainfall mm (inches)	68 (2.69)	67 (2.65)	65 (2.56)	51 (2.01)	50 (1.95)	51 (2.01)	74 (2.93)	68 (2.69)	69 (2.72)	71 (2.81)	60 (2.36)	62 (2.44)	732 (28.82)
Average snowy days (≥ 1 mm)	15	15	14	10	4	0	0	0	0	5	9	12	84
Source: (MSN)

=== Nature ===
White-tailed eagles, reindeer, and moose abound, as is common in most of Norway (reindeer do not live in the coastal south).
