= 70th parallel =

70th parallel may refer to:

- 70th parallel north, a circle of latitude in the Northern Hemisphere
- 70th parallel south, a circle of latitude in the Southern Hemisphere
