= Sagfjord Church =

- Sagfjord kirke Rivtakvuona girkko
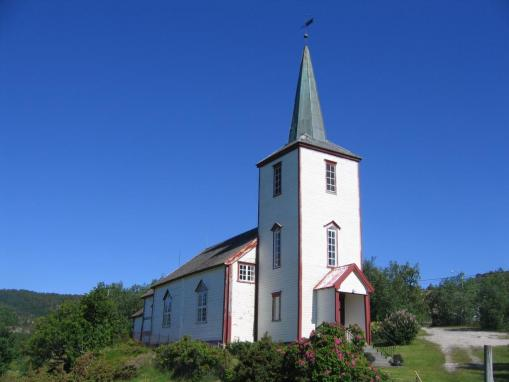
- View of the church
- Sagfjord Church
- 68.0000480°N 15.7682012°E
- Location: Hamarøy Municipality, Nordland
- Country: Norway
- Denomination: Church of Norway
- Churchmanship: Evangelical Lutheran

History
- Status: Parish church
- Founded: Middle Ages
- Consecrated: 1886
- Events: Moved from Presteid to Karlsøy in 1885

Architecture
- Functional status: Active
- Architect: S. Mathisen
- Architectural type: Long church
- Completed: 1775 (251 years ago)

Specifications
- Capacity: 130
- Materials: Wood

Administration
- Diocese: Sør-Hålogaland
- Deanery: Ofoten prosti
- Parish: Sagfjord
- Norwegian Cultural Heritage Site
- Type: Church
- Status: Listed
- ID: 85355

Sagfjord Church (Norwegian: Sagfjord kirke or Northern Sami: Rivtakvuona girkko) is a parish church of the Church of Norway in Hamarøy Municipality in Nordland county, Norway. It is located in the village of Karlsøy on the island of Finnøya. It is one of the churches for the Sagfjord parish which is part of the Ofoten prosti (deanery) in the Diocese of Sør-Hålogaland. The white, wooden church was built in a long church style in 1886 using plans drawn up by the architect S. Mathisen. The church seats about 130 people.

== History ==
The first church on this site was built during the Middle Ages. Not much is known about that building. At some point the church was closed and torn down. In 1885, it was decided to move the old Hamarøy Church from Presteid to the village of Karlsøy on the nearby island of Finnøya. After the move it would be known as the Sagfjord Church. The old church was originally built in 1775 (in Presteid as Hamarøy Church) and in 1840 the church was renovated and repaired.

In 1886, the materials were moved to Karlsøy and rebuilt as the new Sagfjord Church (on the same site as the medieval church that once served this area). The new church is made up of four sections in a row: tower, nave, choir, and sacristy. The main entrance is on top of a steep flight of outside steps at the foot of the tower. Under the tower is an entry porch that also includes stairs up to the 2nd floor seating in a balcony as well as to the clock tower. A set of double doors separates the entry area from the rectangular nave. Beyond the nave is a small, square-shaped choir. Behind the altar panel, is a hidden door which leads to the sacristy which is a smaller square shaped room.

== Media gallery ==
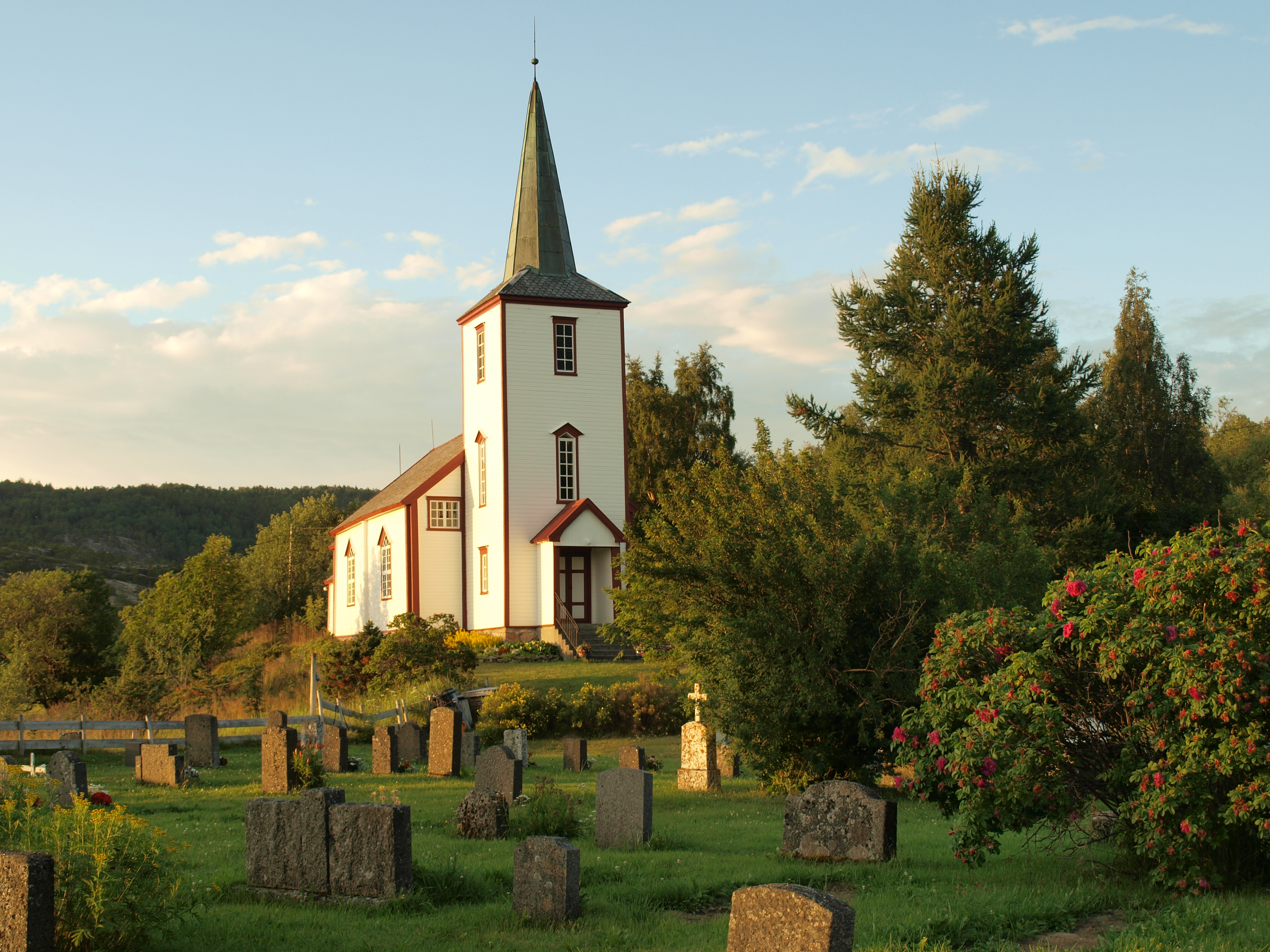

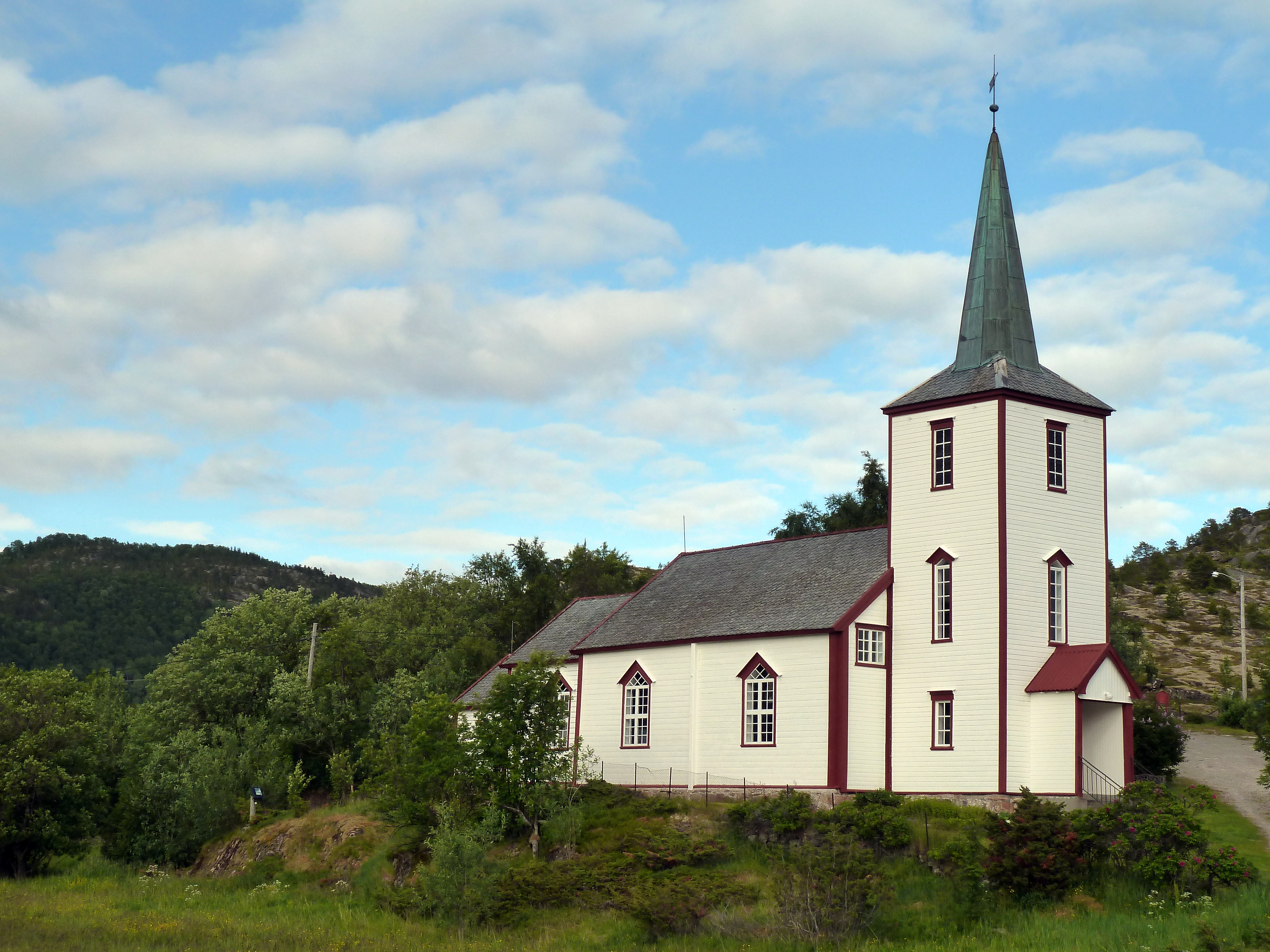

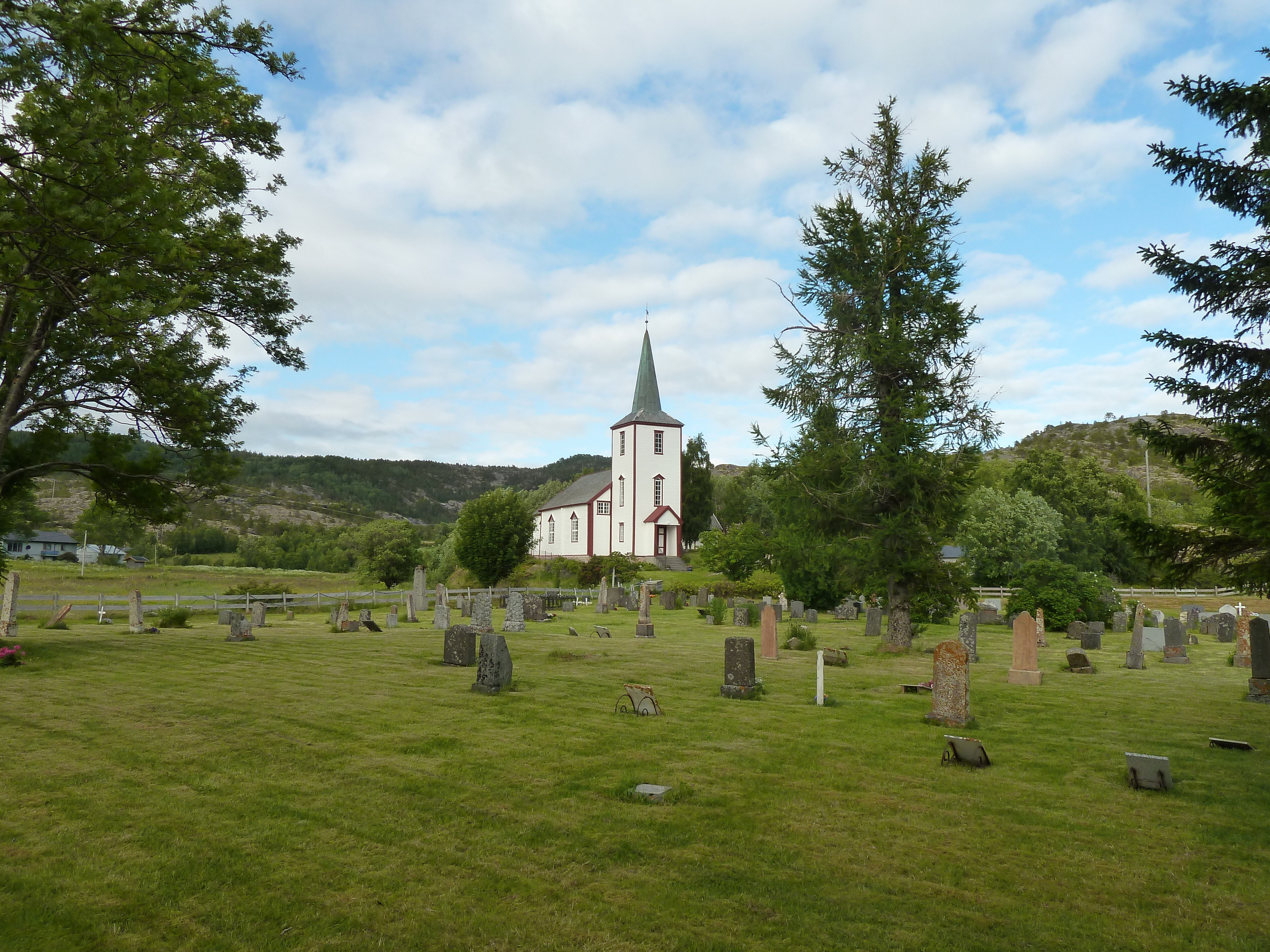

== See also ==
- List of churches in Sør-Hålogaland
