= 68th parallel =

68th parallel may refer to:

- 68th parallel north, a circle of latitude in the Northern Hemisphere
- 68th parallel south, a circle of latitude in the Southern Hemisphere
