= McLoughlin Bay =

Bay in Nunavut, Canada

- Location within Nunavut
- Location: Queen Maud Gulf
- Coordinates: 67°50′35″N 98°34′45″W
- Ocean/sea sources: Arctic Ocean
- Basin countries: Canada
- Settlements: Uninhabited

McLoughlin Bay is an Arctic waterway in the Kitikmeot Region, Nunavut, Canada. It is located on the southeastern corner of the Queen Maud Gulf off Nunavut's mainland.

The bay was photographed by Vilhjalmur Stefansson during his Arctic expeditions.
