= 67th parallel =

67th parallel may refer to:

- 67th parallel north, a circle of latitude in the Northern Hemisphere
- 67th parallel south, a circle of latitude in the Southern Hemisphere
