= Klutschak Peninsula =

Peninsula in Nunavut, Canada

- Interactive map of Klutschak Peninsula

Geography
- Location: Nunavut, Canada
- Coordinates: 67°55′N 98°30′W

Administration
- Canada

The Klutschak Peninsula is on the north side of the Nunavut mainland in Canada. To the west is O'Reilly Island and Queen Maud Gulf, and to the east is the Adelaide Peninsula.

It is named after Heinrich Klutschak, an Austrian-American author and explorer.
