= Alexandra Strait =

- Interactive map of Alexandra Strait
- Location: Nunavut
- Country: Canada
- Coordinates: 69°02′59″N 099°46′00″W

Alexandra Strait is a natural waterway in the Canadian territory of Nunavut. It separates King William Island to the east from Royal Geographical Society Island to the west. The strait, an arm of the Arctic Ocean, connects Victoria Strait to the north with Queen Maud Gulf to the south.
