= Fairholme =

Fairholme or Fairholm may refer to:

- Fairholme Island, Nunavut, Canada
- Fairholme Range, Alberta, Canada
- Fairholm, Washington, United States
- Fairholme College, Australia
- Fairholme (John Street Home), Cadiz, Kentucky, a historic house listed on the National Register of Historic Places
- Fairholme (Newport, Rhode Island), a historic mansion in Newport, Rhode Island, United States
- Fairholme, Saskatchewan, Canada

== People with the surname ==
- George Fairholme (1789–1846), Scottish geologist
- James Walter Fairholme (1821–c. 1848), British Royal Navy officer
- Jeff Fairholm (born 1965), Canadian football player
- Larry Fairholm (born 1941), Canadian football player
