= Klutschak Point =

Klutschak Point (54°10′S 37°41′W) is a rocky point 2 nautical miles (4 km) southeast of Cape Demidov on the south coast of South Georgia. The coast in this vicinity was roughly charted in 1775 by a British expedition under James Cook and in 1819 by a Russian expedition under Fabian Gottlieb von Bellingshausen. The point itself appears on charts dating back to about 1900. It was named by the UK Antarctic Place-Names Committee following a survey by the South Georgia Survey, 1951–52, for Heinrich W. Klutschak, an Austrian artist who accompanied the American sealing schooner Flying Fish to South Georgia in 1877–78 and published a narrative of his activities with a sketch map in 1881.
