= 66th parallel =

66th parallel may refer to:

- 66th parallel north, a circle of latitude in the Northern Hemisphere
- 66th parallel south, a circle of latitude in the Southern Hemisphere
