= Schrader Glacier =

Glacier in Antarctica

- Location within South Georgia Island
- Location: South Georgia
- Coordinates: 54°7′S 37°39′W
- Thickness: unknown
- Terminus: Wilson Harbour
- Status: unknown

Schrader Glacier (54°7′S 37°39′W) is a small glacier which flows to the head of Wilson Harbour on the south coast of South Georgia. Charted by the German Antarctic Expedition under Wilhelm Filchner, 1911–12, and named for Dr. K. Schrader, leader of the German group of the International Polar Year Investigations based at Royal Bay in 1882–83.

== See also ==
- List of glaciers in the Antarctic
- Glaciology
