= Kade Point =

Kade Point (54°6′S 37°44′W) is a point separating Ice Fjord and Wilson Harbor on the south coast of South Georgia. Kade Point is an established name dating back to about 1912.
