= Fairholme Island =

Island in Qikiqtaaluk Region, Nunavut, Canada

- Location within Nunavut Location within Canada

Geography
- Location: Northern Canada
- Coordinates: 76°35′N 096°23′W
- Archipelago: Queen Elizabeth Islands; Arctic Archipelago

Administration
- Canada
- Territory: Nunavut

Demographics
- Population: Uninhabited

Fairholme Island is a member of the Queen Elizabeth Islands and the Arctic Archipelago in the territory of Nunavut. It is an irregularly shaped island located in the Penny Strait, between John Barrow Island and the entrance to Barrow Harbour, Devon Island. Sir John Barrow Monument is to the southeast.

Another, smaller Fairholme Island also lies within Nunavut, off Graham Gore Peninsula in the Alexandra Strait.
