= Qikiqtaryuaq =

Island in Nunavut, Canada

Native name: Qikiqtaryuaq
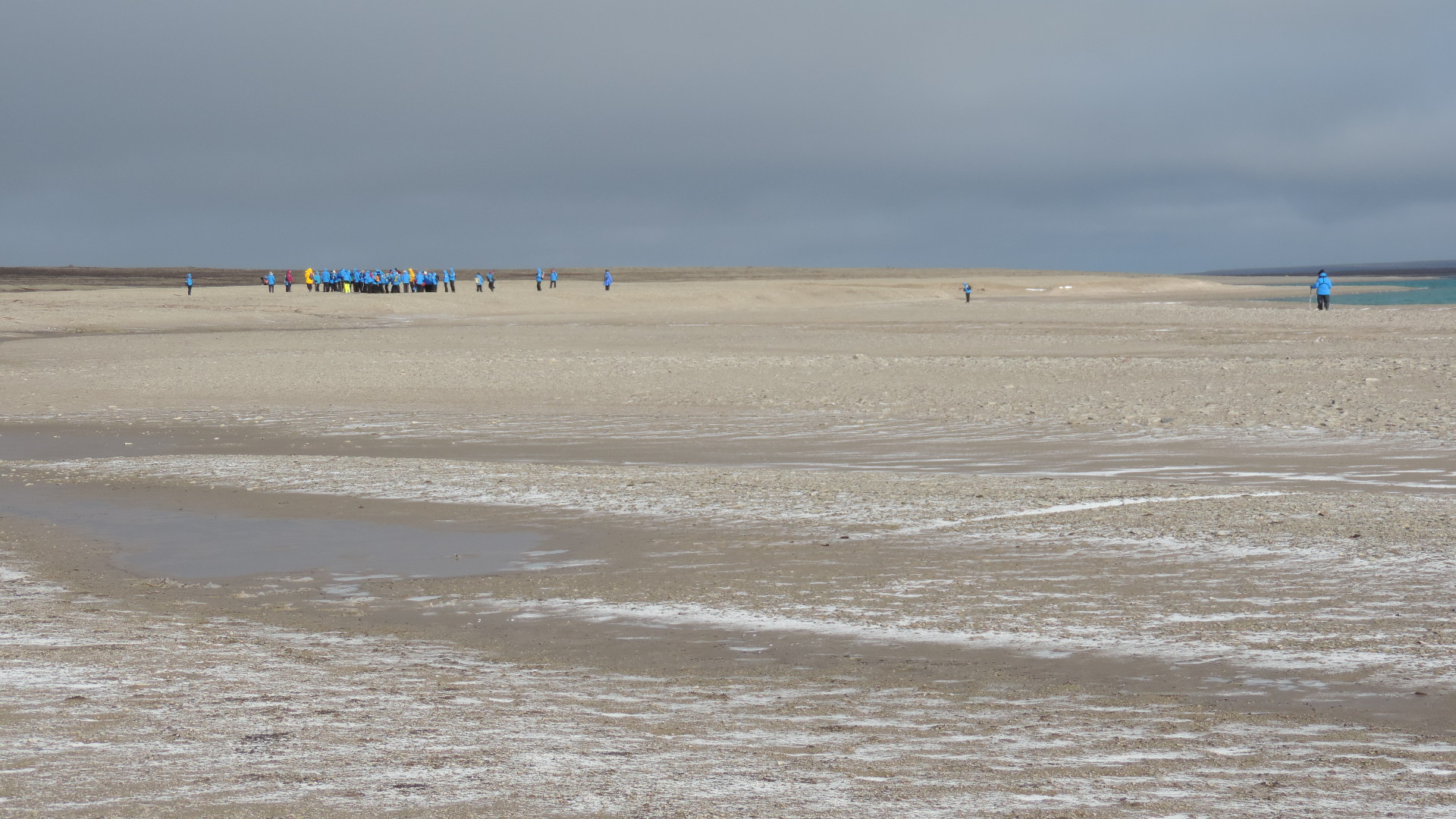
- Tourists exploring Jenny Lind Island, 2019

- Location within Nunavut Location within Canada

Geography
- Location: Queen Maud Gulf
- Coordinates: 68°43′17″N 102°02′12″W
- Archipelago: Arctic Archipelago
- Area: 420 km^{2} (160 sq mi)
- Highest elevation: 80 m (260 ft)

Administration
- Canada
- Territory: Nunavut
- Region: Kitikmeot

Demographics
- Population: Uninhabited

Qikiqtaryuaq, formerly Jenny Lind Island, for the Swedish born opera singer, Jenny Lind, is a small island 420 km^{2} (160 sq mi) in the Kitikmeot Region of Nunavut, Canada. The island is located in the Queen Maud Gulf, about 120 km (75 mi) southeast of Cambridge Bay.

The island is the site of CAM-1A (Jenny Lind Island), a former Distant Early Warning Line site and home to the unmanned North Warning System site.

== Geography ==
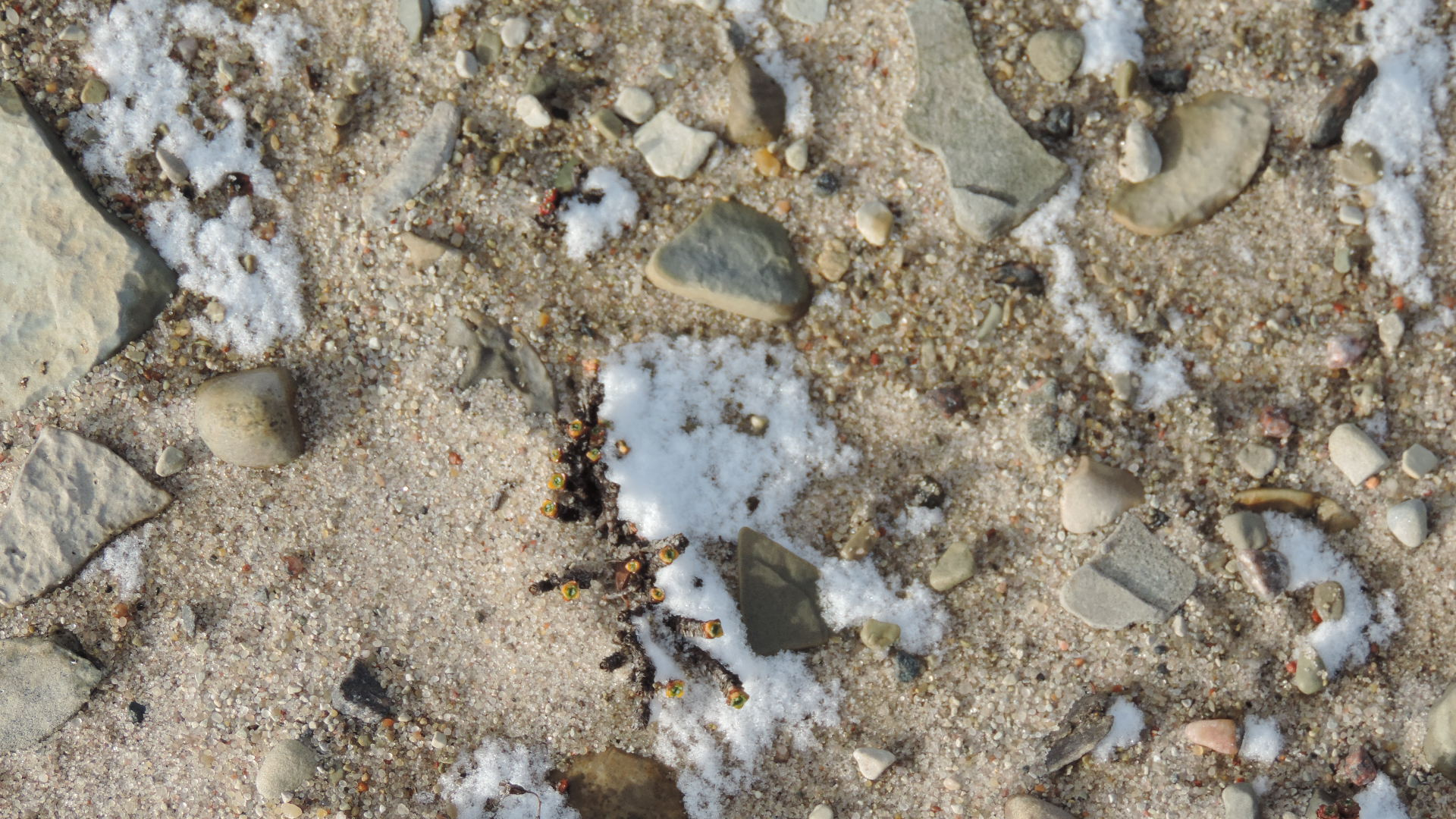
Sandy shoreline, 2019

Characteristics of the terrain include rocky ridges, low-lying wetlands, sedge meadows, and a sandy shoreline.

== Fauna ==
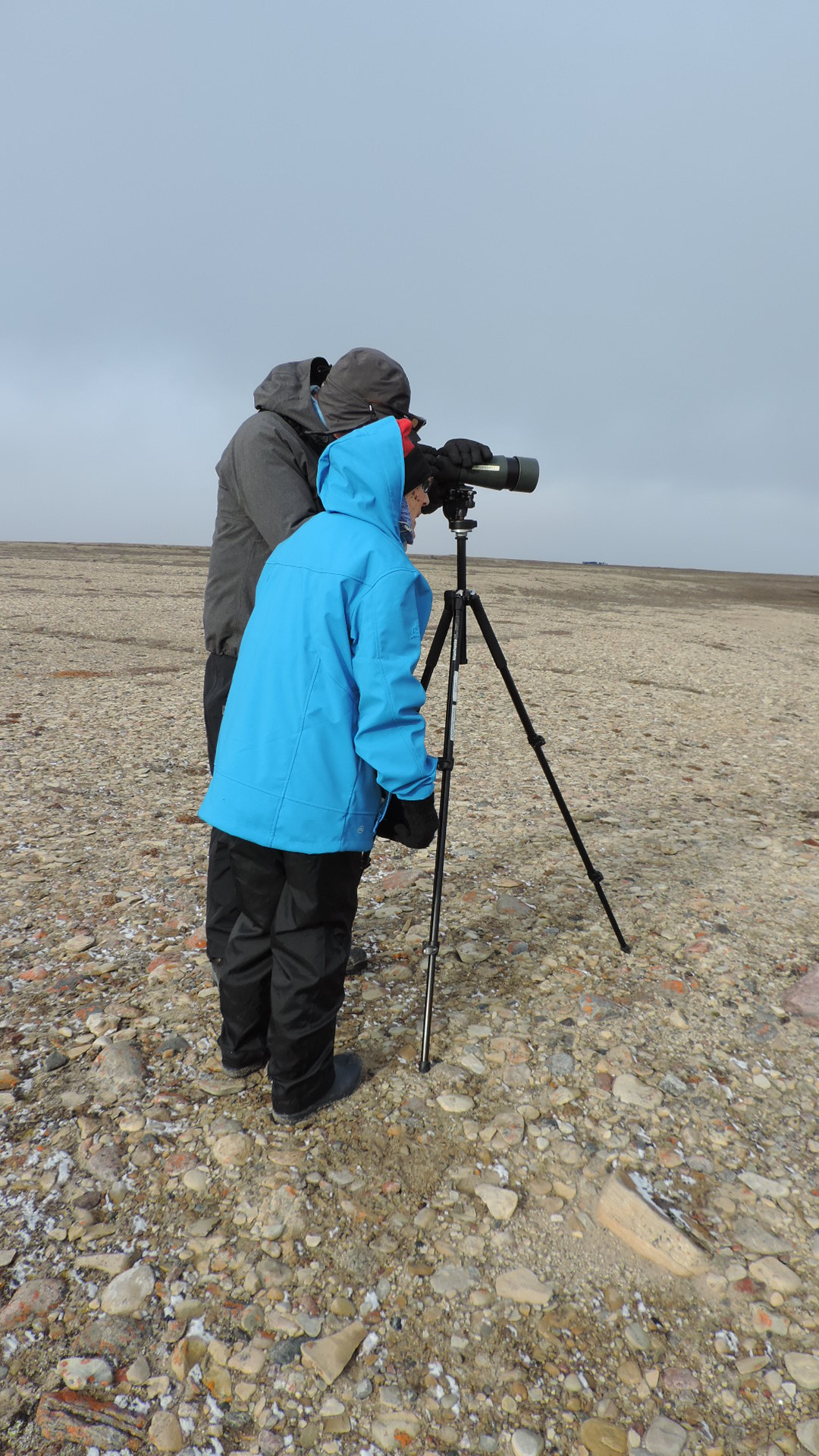
Tourists searching for wildlife on Jenny Lind Island, 2019

Qikiqtaryuaq is a Canadian Important Bird Area (#NU088), and a Key Migratory Terrestrial Bird Site. Notable bird species include Canada goose, lesser snow goose, and Ross's goose.

Muskoxen are found in the south east section of the island.

== Climate ==
Climate data for Jenny Lind Island Airport (1961-1990)
Month	Jan	Feb	Mar	Apr	May	Jun	Jul	Aug	Sep	Oct	Nov	Dec	Year
Record high °C (°F)	−5.1 (22.8)	−8.8 (16.2)	−7.8 (18.0)	2.8 (37.0)	6.1 (43.0)	18.3 (64.9)	22.8 (73.0)	20.6 (69.1)	15.0 (59.0)	6.0 (42.8)	0.6 (33.1)	−2.8 (27.0)	22.8 (73.0)
Mean daily maximum °C (°F)	—	—	−26.1 (−15.0)	−17.3 (0.9)	−5.8 (21.6)	3.2 (37.8)	9.6 (49.3)	7.2 (45.0)	1.0 (33.8)	−7.5 (18.5)	−19.2 (−2.6)	−25.1 (−13.2)	—
Daily mean °C (°F)	—	—	−29.9 (−21.8)	−21.6 (−6.9)	−9.3 (15.3)	0.7 (33.3)	6.1 (43.0)	4.5 (40.1)	−0.9 (30.4)	−10.4 (13.3)	−22.7 (−8.9)	−28.6 (−19.5)	—
Mean daily minimum °C (°F)	−37.2 (−35.0)	−37.4 (−35.3)	−34.6 (−30.3)	−26.1 (−15.0)	−13.0 (8.6)	−1.9 (28.6)	2.6 (36.7)	1.7 (35.1)	−3.0 (26.6)	−13.6 (7.5)	−26.7 (−16.1)	−33.2 (−27.8)	−18.5 (−1.3)
Record low °C (°F)	−51.2 (−60.2)	−51.2 (−60.2)	−50.0 (−58.0)	−43.3 (−45.9)	−30.6 (−23.1)	−17.2 (1.0)	−2.8 (27.0)	−7.8 (18.0)	−16.7 (1.9)	−33.2 (−27.8)	−42.8 (−45.0)	−47.2 (−53.0)	−51.2 (−60.2)
Average precipitation mm (inches)	2.2 (0.09)	2.4 (0.09)	2.7 (0.11)	3.9 (0.15)	5.9 (0.23)	10.6 (0.42)	19.6 (0.77)	25.9 (1.02)	18.6 (0.73)	14.0 (0.55)	5.5 (0.22)	3.0 (0.12)	114.3 (4.50)
Source: 1961-1990 Environment and Climate Change Canada

== History ==
The island is uninhabited but still has an active North Warning System. Originally part of the Distant Early Warning Line, the site is known as CAM-1.
