= O'Reilly Island =

Island in Nunavut, Canada

- Location within Nunavut

Geography
- Location: Queen Maud Gulf
- Coordinates: 68°02′13″N 98°58′53″W
- Archipelago: Arctic Archipelago
- Area: 34.6 km^{2} (13.4 sq mi)

Administration
- Canada
- Territory: Nunavut

O'Reilly Island is an uninhabited island in Nunavut Territory, Canada. It lies to the south of King William Island and to the west of the Klutschak and Adelaide Peninsulas, in the easternmost part of the Queen Maud Gulf.

== History ==
The island and especially the islet to the northwest was extensively used by the Thule and later Inuit peoples to hunt seal and caribou.

The wreck of HMS Erebus from Franklin's lost expedition was discovered just west of O'Reilly Island in Queen Maud Gulf, in September 2014. However, Nancy Anilniliak, the Field Unit Superintendent of the Nunavut Field Unit, has restricted access to a rectangular area in Wilmot and Crampton Bay, to the west of the Adelaide Peninsula and about 25 km (16 mi) northeast of O'Reilly Island. The area runs from Point A (68°14′44.8″N 98°52′22.3″W) to Point B (68°17′44.2″N 98°40′17.9″W) to Point C (68°13′15.4″N 98°32′16.2″W) to Point D (68°10′16.5″N 98°44′19.3″W).
