= Sagfjorden (Nordland) =

Fjord in Nordland, Norway

Sagfjorden (Norwegian) Rivtakvuodna (Lule Sami)
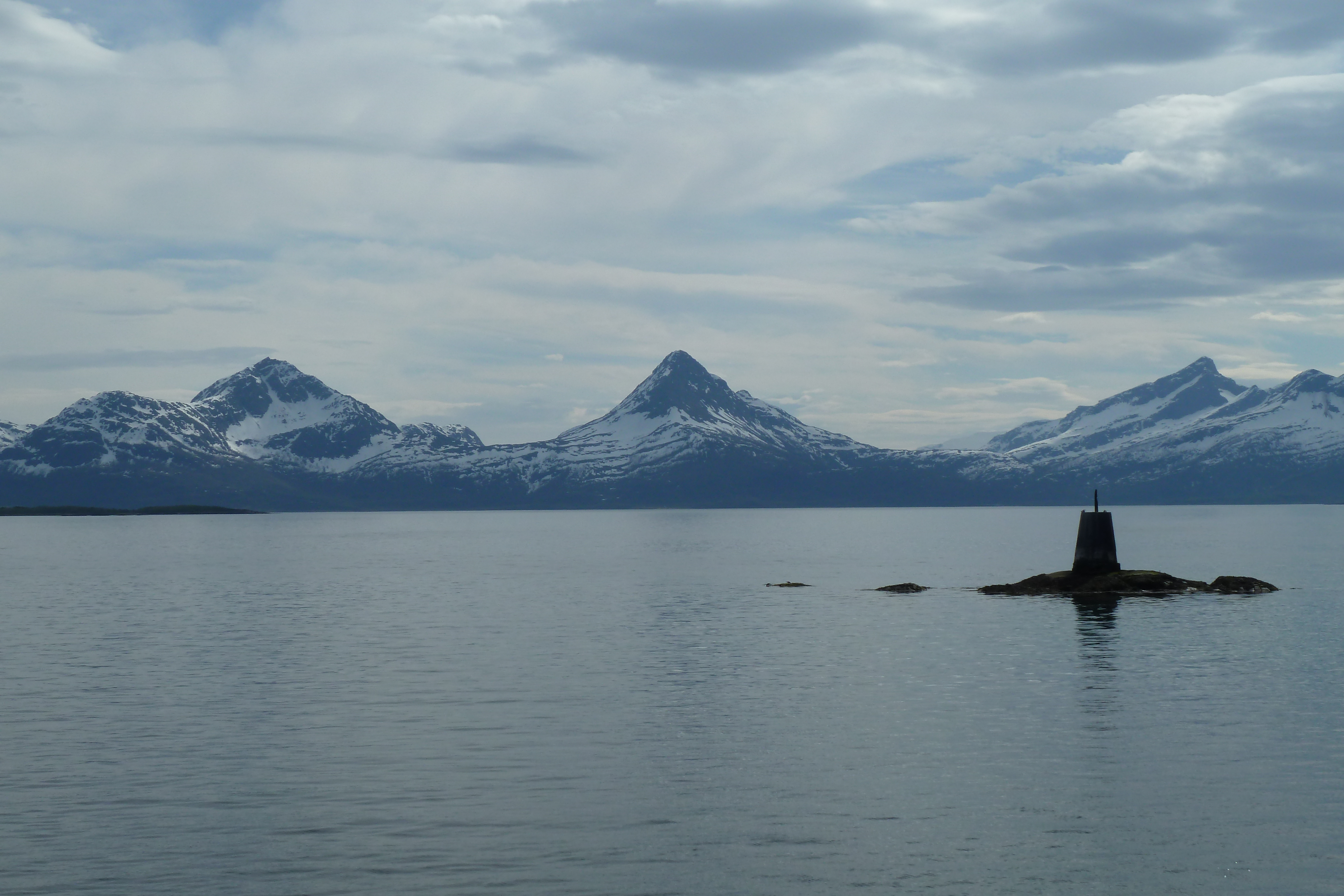
- View of the fjord
- Interactive map of the fjord
- Location: Nordland county, Norway
- Coordinates: 67.9564°N 15.5016°E
- Type: Fjord
- Primary outflows: Vestfjorden
- Basin countries: Norway
- Max. length: 38 kilometres (24 mi)
- Max. width: 8 kilometres (5.0 mi)
- Max. depth: 646 metres (2,119 ft)
- Islands: Finnøya, Lundøya, Engeløya

Sagfjorden (Norwegian) or Rivtakvuodna (Lule Sami) is a fjord in Nordland county, Norway. The 38-kilometre (24 mi) long fjord forms part of the boundary between Hamarøy Municipality and Steigen Municipality. There are several large islands in the fjord as well: Finnøya to the north and Lundøya and Engeløya at the mouth of the fjord where it joins the Vestfjorden.

The fjord has narrow entrances between the islands and mainland peninsulas in the west, but in the central part of the fjord it reaches up to 8 kilometres (5.0 mi) wide. The fjord reaches depths of up to 646 metres (2,119 ft) in the Økssundet strait in the western part of the fjord. The village of Karlsøy is on Finnøya on the north shore of the fjord and the villages of Innhavet and Tømmerneset both lie at the innermost parts of the fjord in the east.

== See also ==
- List of Norwegian fjords
