= Grays Bay =

Bay in Nunavut, Canada

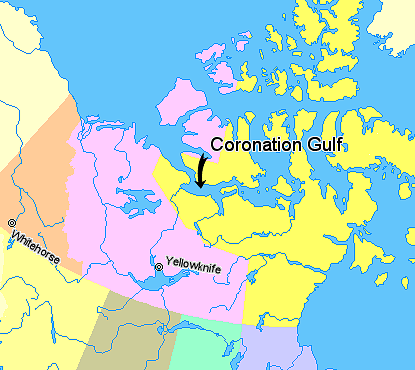
- Grays Bay is located in Coronation Gulf, Nunavut, Canada

- Grays Bay, Nunavut
- Location: Coronation Gulf
- Coordinates: 67°49′N 111°03′W
- River sources: Tree River, Annielik River
- Ocean/sea sources: Arctic Ocean
- Basin countries: Canada
- Settlements: Uninhabited

Grays Bay is an Arctic waterway in the Kitikmeot Region, Nunavut, Canada. It is located in Coronation Gulf with Hepburn Island at its mouth. The Tree River and the Annielik River flow into the bay. Grays Bay lies beside the Northwest Passage, part of the disputed Canadian Internal Waters of the Arctic Archipelago, see territorial claims in the Arctic.

It is the ancestral home of the Kogluktuaryumiut, a Copper Inuit subgroup.

== Shipping ==
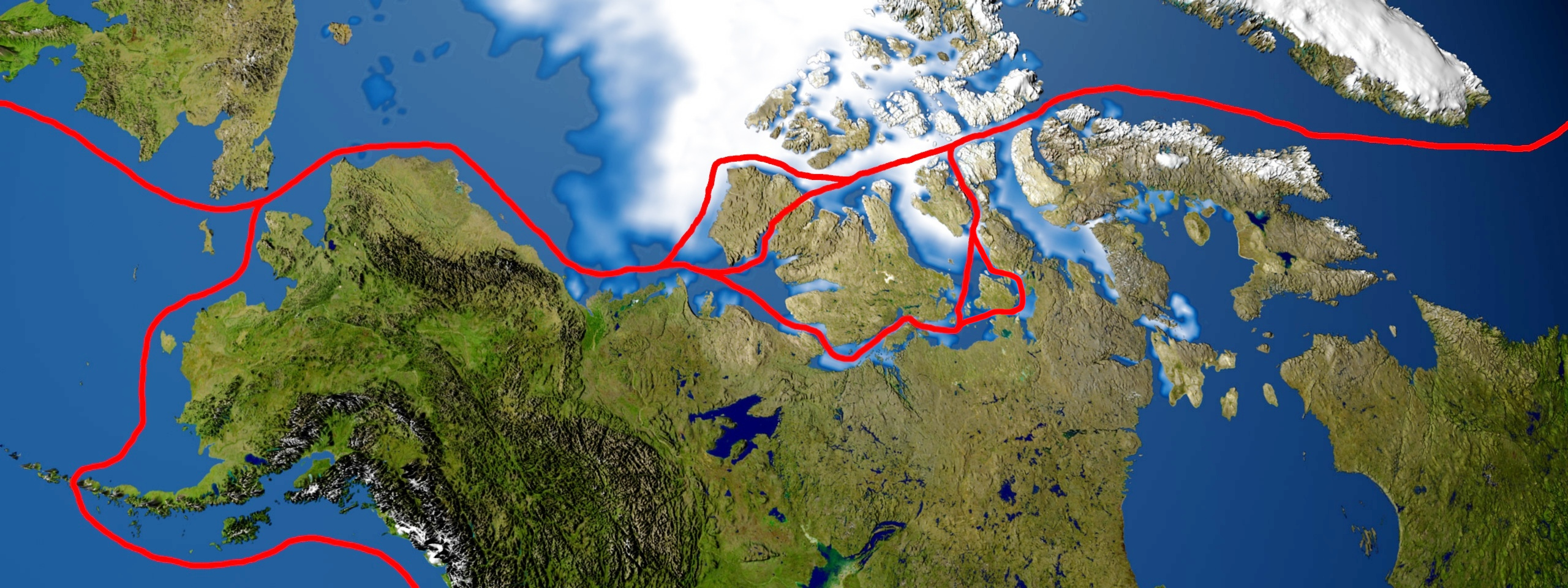
Northwest Passage routes

Grays Bay was proposed as the site of a potential dock facility. In 2007 Wolfden Resources received a favourable review "for its copper/zinc mine proposal from the Nunavut Impact Review Board (NIRB)." The proposal included plans for a 53-kilometre (33 mi) all-weather road that would include a dock facility at Grays Bay on the Coronation Gulf, and will parallel the Kennartic River to the mine site at High Lake."

MMG Minerals (Minerals and Metals Group), a subsidiary of the Chinese state-owned China Minmetals (Minmetals Resources), has also proposed a port "that could accommodate ships of up to 50,000 tonnes (Note: 50,000 tonnes (49,000 long tons; 55,000 short tons)) that would make 16 round trips a year — both east and west —through the Northwest Passage" and a "350-kilometre (Note: 350-kilometre (220 mi)) all-weather road with 70 bridges that would stretch from Izok Lake to Grays Bay." The multibillion-dollar Izok Corridor project is projected to produce 180,000 tonnes (180,000 long tons; 200,000 short tons) of zinc and another 50,000 t (49,000 long tons; 55,000 short tons) of copper a year. In order to do this "Izok Lake would be drained, the water dammed and diverted to a nearby lake. Three smaller lakes at High Lake would also be drained. Grays Bay would be substantially filled in."

In their August 2012 proposal, which has since been revised, MMG Minerals described the planned facilities at the Grays Bay Port that would "include a dock, concentration storage shed, fuel storage facilities and a camp. These facilities will support storage of concentrate, loading of bulk-carrier ships, and re-supply of fuel and goods for the Project." The Grays Bay port would be open three months of the year to "ship ore in two directions through both ends of the Northwest Passage."

The project was revived in 2024, with permitting anticipated to take until 2027, and construction to begin in 2030.

On 12 March 2026, Prime Minister Mark Carney announced funding for a 230 km (140 mi), all-season road from Gray's Bay south to the Northwest Territories border. Construction of the road will improve northern sovereignty, in addition to construction of northern military operational support hubs in Whitehorse, Resolute, Rankin Inlet and Cambridge Bay, and upgrades the national defence infrastructure in Yellowknife, Inuvik, Iqaluit and Happy Valley-Goose Bay.
