= Hepburn Island =

Island in Nunavut, Canada

- Interactive map of Hepburn Island

Geography
- Location: Coronation Gulf
- Coordinates: 67°54′N 110°56′W
- Archipelago: Canadian Arctic Archipelago

Administration
- Canada
- Territory: Nunavut
- Region: Kitikmeot

Demographics
- Population: Uninhabited

Hepburn Island is an island located in the south of the Coronation Gulf, just across Grays Bay from the mainland. It is in the Kitikmeot Region, Nunavut, Canada.
