= Lundøya =

Island in Nordland, Norway

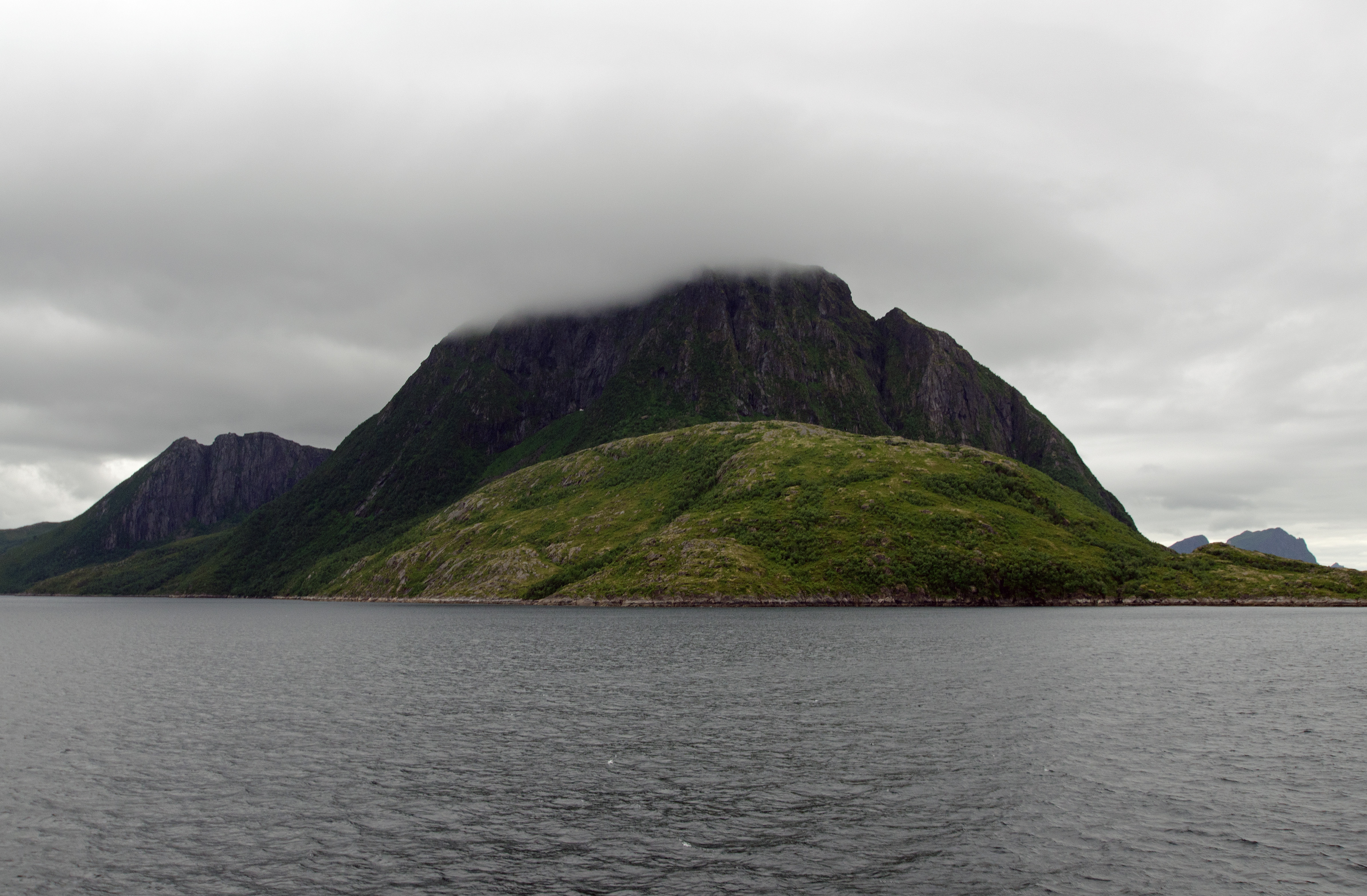
- Interactive map of Lundøya

Geography
- Location: Nordland, Norway
- Coordinates: 67.9864°N 15.2023°E
- Area: 26.7 km^{2} (10.3 sq mi)
- Length: 9 km (5.6 mi)
- Width: 5 km (3.1 mi)
- Highest elevation: 803 m (2635 ft)
- Highest point: Lundtinden

Administration
- Norway
- County: Nordland
- Municipality: Steigen Municipality

Demographics
- Population: 0 (since 1970s)

Lundøya is an island in Steigen Municipality in Nordland county, Norway. The island lies at the entrance to the Sagfjorden between the island of Engeløya in Steigen and the village of Skutvika on the mainland in Hamarøy Municipality. The island has an area of 26.46 square kilometres (10.22 sq mi) and its highest point is the 803-metre (2,635 ft) tall mountain Lundtinden. Lundøya is now uninhabited, but has previously had settlements on it until the 1970s.

== See also ==
- List of islands of Norway
