= Wilson Harbour =

Coordinates: 54°7′S 37°42′W

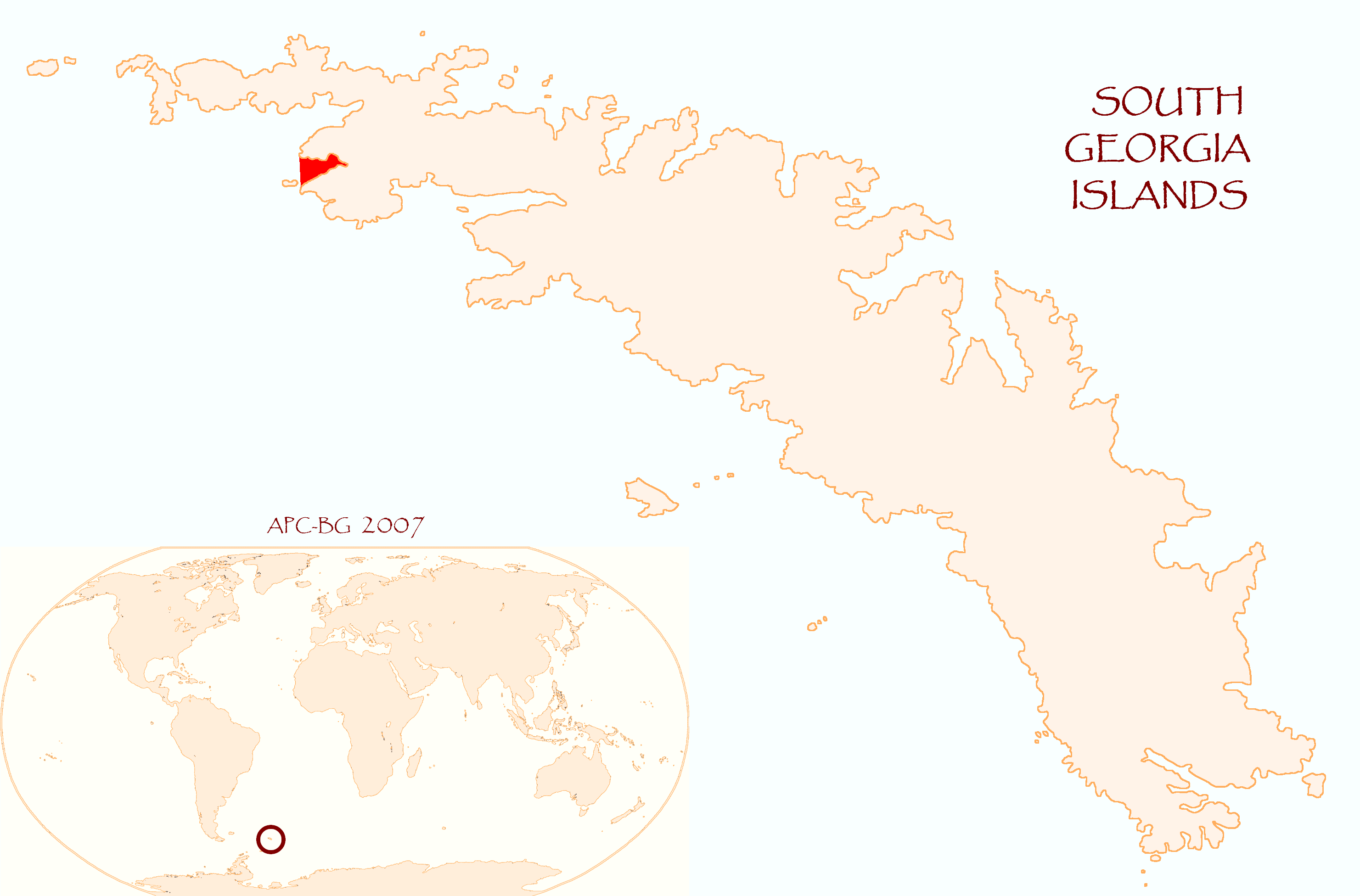
Location of Wilson Harbour on South Georgia Island

Wilson Harbour is a bay 1.5 miles (2.4 km) wide and 3 miles (4.8 km) long, between Kade Point and Cape Demidov along the south coast of South Georgia. This coast was roughly charted by a Russian expedition under Fabian Gottlieb von Bellingshausen in 1819. Wilson Harbour was named about 1912, probably for J. Innes Wilson, who sketched some of the inland portions of the island at about that time.
