= Karlsøy, Nordland =

Village in Hamarøy Municipality, Norway

Karlsøy, Nordland: Karlsøy (Norwegian); Dirveksuoloj (Lule Sami)
- Village
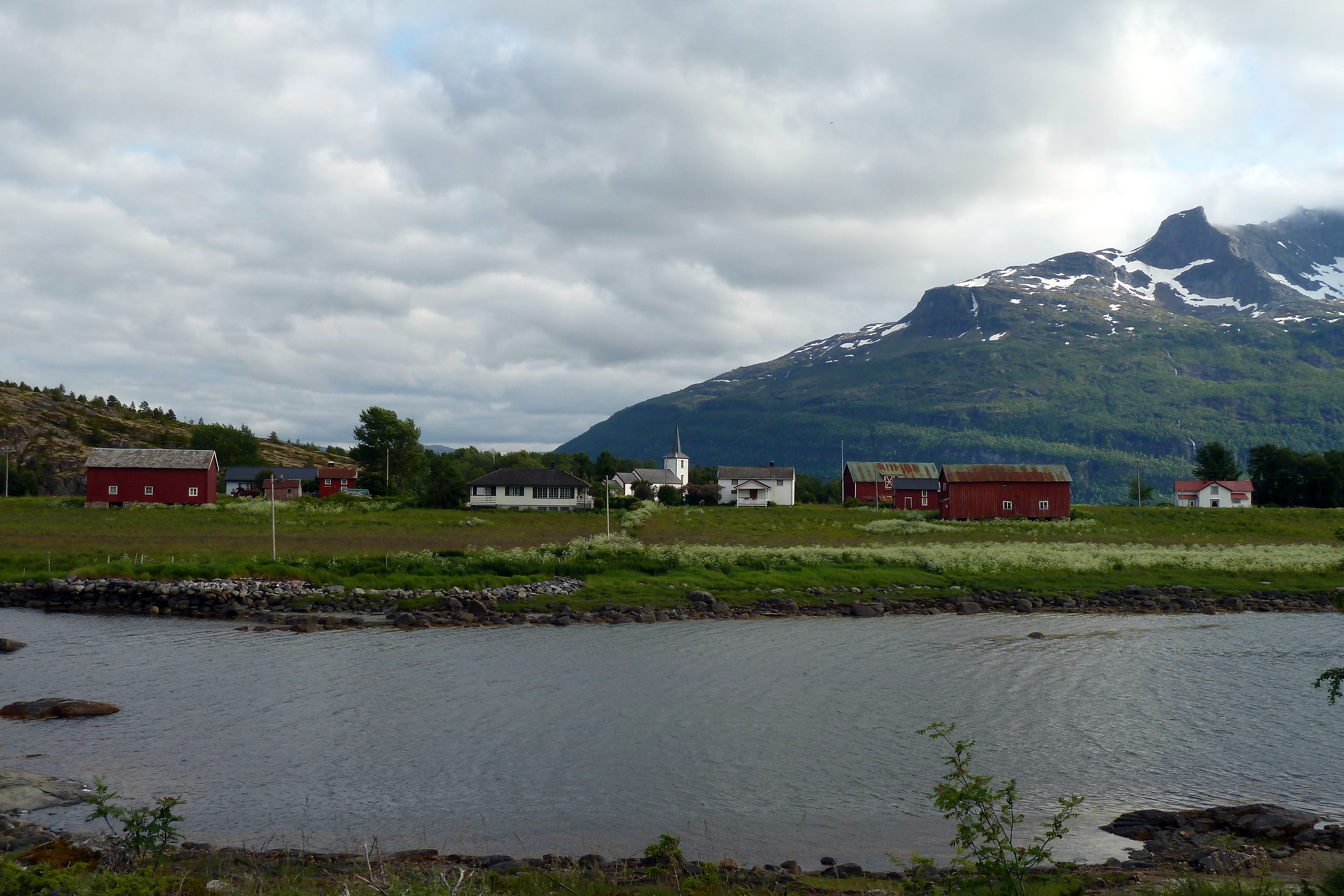
- View of the village, Sagfjord Church in the centre
- Interactive map of Karlsøy, Nordland
- Location within Nordland Location within Norway
- Coordinates: 68.0009°N 15.7655°E
- Country: Norway
- Region: Northern Norway
- County: Nordland
- District: Salten
- Municipality: Hamarøy Municipality
- Elevation: 5 m (16 ft)
- Time zone: UTC+01:00 (CET)
  - Summer (DST): UTC+02:00 (CEST)
- Post Code: 8260 Innhavet

Karlsøy (Norwegian) or Dirveksuoloj (Lule Sami) is a village in Hamarøy Municipality in Nordland county, Norway. It is located on the southern coast of the island of Finnøya, along the Sagfjorden, about 8 kilometres (5.0 mi) northwest of the village of Innhavet. Sagfjord Church is located in Karlsøy, serving the residents of this part of the municipality.

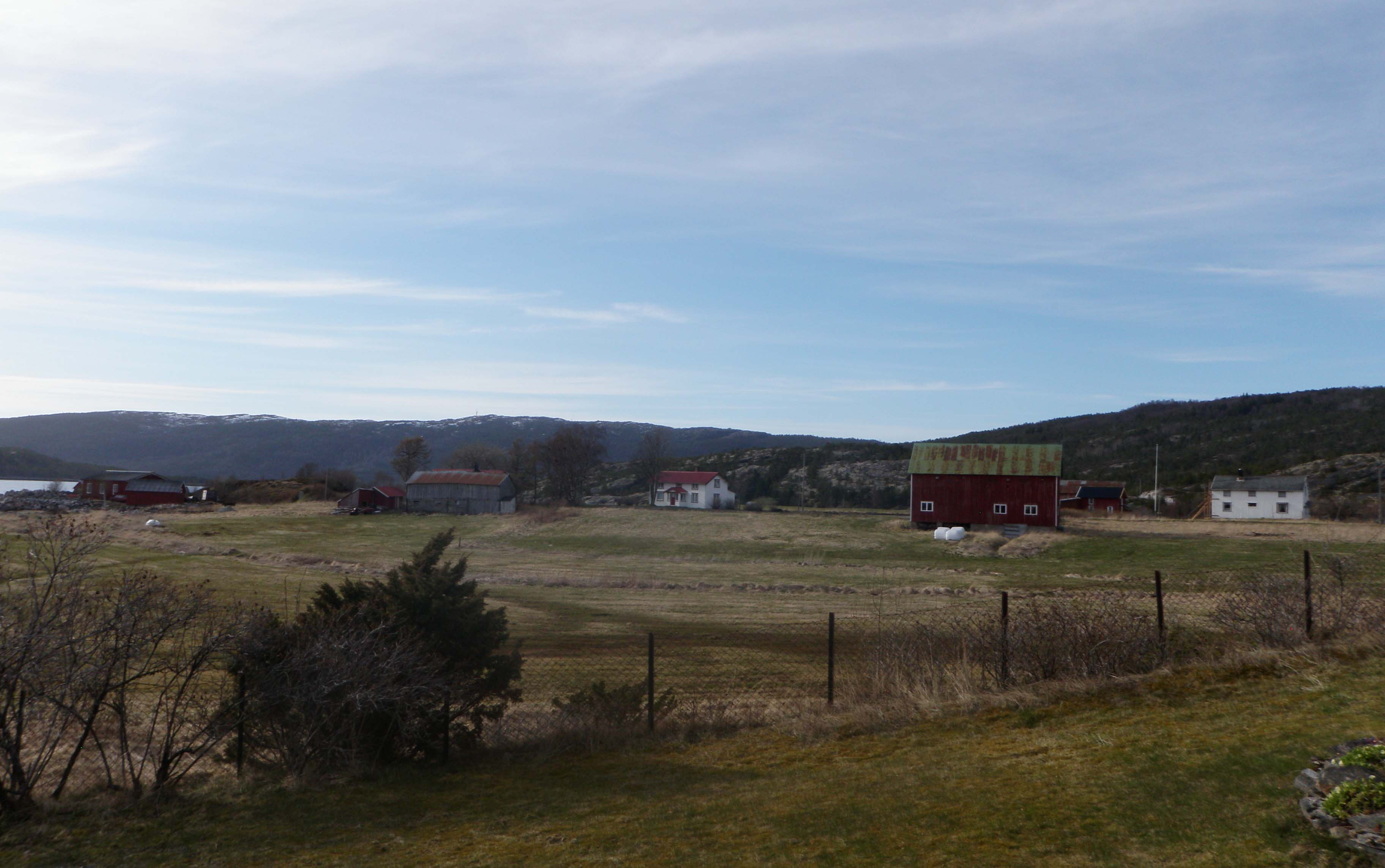
View of Karlsøy from Sagfjord Church
