= Presteid =

Village in Hamarøy Municipality, Norway

- Village
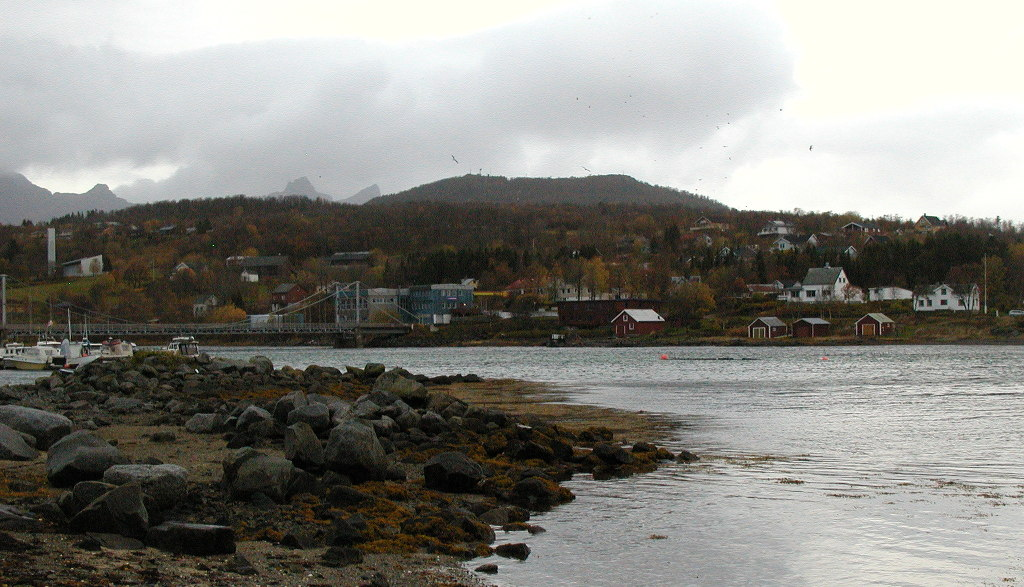
- View of the village
- Interactive map of Presteid
- Location within Nordland Location within Norway
- Coordinates: 68.0843°N 15.6500°E
- Country: Norway
- Region: Northern Norway
- County: Nordland
- District: Salten
- Municipality: Hamarøy Municipality
- Elevation: 9 m (30 ft)
- Time zone: UTC+01:00 (CET)
  - Summer (DST): UTC+02:00 (CEST)
- Post Code: 8294 Hamarøy

Presteid is a village in Hamarøy Municipality in Nordland county, Norway. It is located immediately east of the village of Oppeid, along the Presteidfjorden. Presteid is part of the Oppeid urban area which has a population (2023) of 557.

The village is the location of Hamarøy Church, the main church for the municipality. The famous Norwegian author Knut Hamsun lived in this village from the age of 9 until 14. He often wrote about Presteid in his works. The Knut Hamsun Centre is located in Presteid, and it is a museum about the author and his works. Stoklands Bilruter, a bus company, was based here until it was merged with Saltens Bilruter.
