= Cape Demidov =

Cape Demidov (54°8′S 37°44′W) is a cape which forms the south side of the entrance to Wilson Harbour, on the south coast and near the western end of South Georgia. It was discovered by a Russian expedition under Fabian Gottlieb von Bellingshausen in 1819, and named for Lieutenant Dimitri Demidov of the Vostok.
