= Victoria Strait =

Strait in Nunavut, Canada

Coordinates: 69.5°N 100.5°W

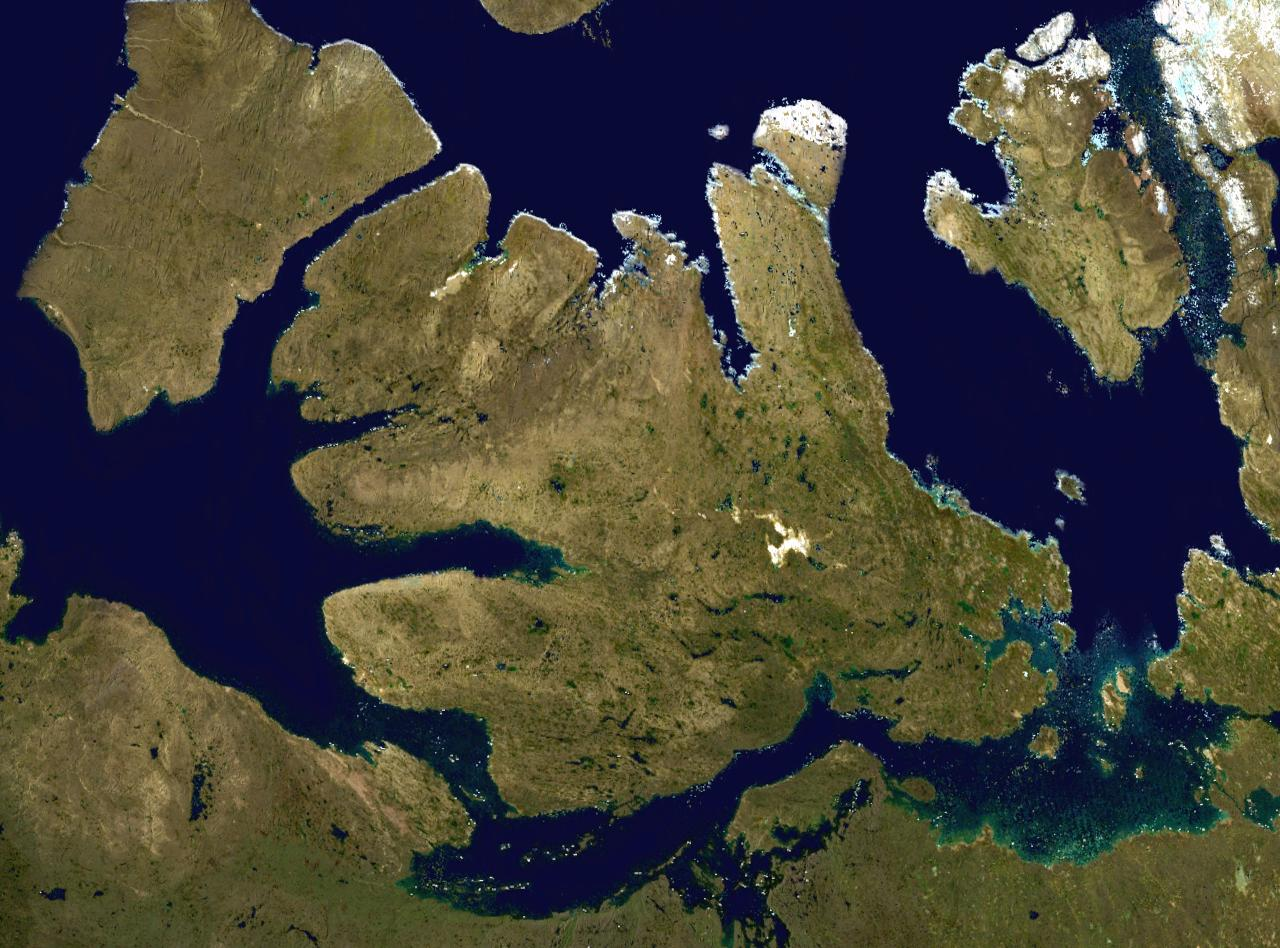
The large island at the centre of this satellite image is Victoria Island, with Banks Island top left. The Victoria Strait adjoins the east coast of Victoria Island, just above the Queen Maud Gulf which runs west to east.

Victoria Strait is a strait in northern Canada that lies in Nunavut off the mainland in the Arctic Ocean. It is between Victoria Island to the west and King William Island to the east. From the north, the strait links the M'Clintock Channel and the Larsen Sound with the Queen Maud Gulf to the south. The strait is about 160 km (100 mi) long and anywhere from 80 to 130 km (50 to 80 mi) wide.

The strait is wide, with almost no islands, save for the rather large Royal Geographical Society Island near the Queen Maud Gulf at the extreme south of the strait. The strait has never been comprehensively surveyed, however, charted portions indicate several patches where the water is only 10 metres (30 ft) deep. Ships drawing up to 9 m (30 ft) have navigated the strait, but it is made very difficult by the ice. Most of the year the strait is covered with rough, heavy ice. Much of this is polar ice which has flowed down the M'Clintock Channel from the Viscount Melville Sound. Large-scale breakup of the ice in the strait begins by late July and continues into late September when it begins to freeze again.

Near the entrance of Victoria Strait was where HMS Terror and HMS Erebus became trapped during John Franklin's expedition and were abandoned in 1848. Due to the hazards of the strait, a longer route was used which went around King William Island. This route was easier despite having an even shallower bottom. In 1967, the Victoria Strait was used for the first time by an icebreaker, the CCGS John A. Macdonald, when travelling to the western Arctic to assist shipping. It was crossed again by the same icebreaker in 1975, and later in 1976 by the icebreakers CCGS Louis S. St-Laurent and CCGS J.E. Bernier.
