= Royal Geographical Society Islands =

Island group in Nunavut, Canada

Native name: Hiurarjuaq
- Location within Nunavut Location within Canada

Geography
- Location: Northern Canada
- Coordinates: 68°56′N 100°15′W
- Area: 458 km^{2} (177 sq mi)

Administration
- Canada
- Territory: Nunavut

Demographics
- Population: Uninhabited
- Ethnic groups: Inuit

The Royal Geographical Society Islands (Inuinnaqtun: Hiurarjuaq; "big sand") formerly the Royal Geographical Society Group are a group of islands lying west of King William Island in Victoria Strait, within the Queen Maud Gulf, in the north Canadian territory of Nunavut.

The largest island, Royal Geographical Society Island, has an area of 458 km^{2} (177 sq mi).

Davidson Point is named after geographer George Davidson. The islands were named by Captain Roald Amundsen for the Royal Geographical Society, a sponsor. According to Amundsen the islands had been reported by John Rae, who had not recognised them as islands.
