= Finnøya, Nordland =

Island in Nordland, Norway

Dirvik (Lule Sami); Finnøya (Norwegian)
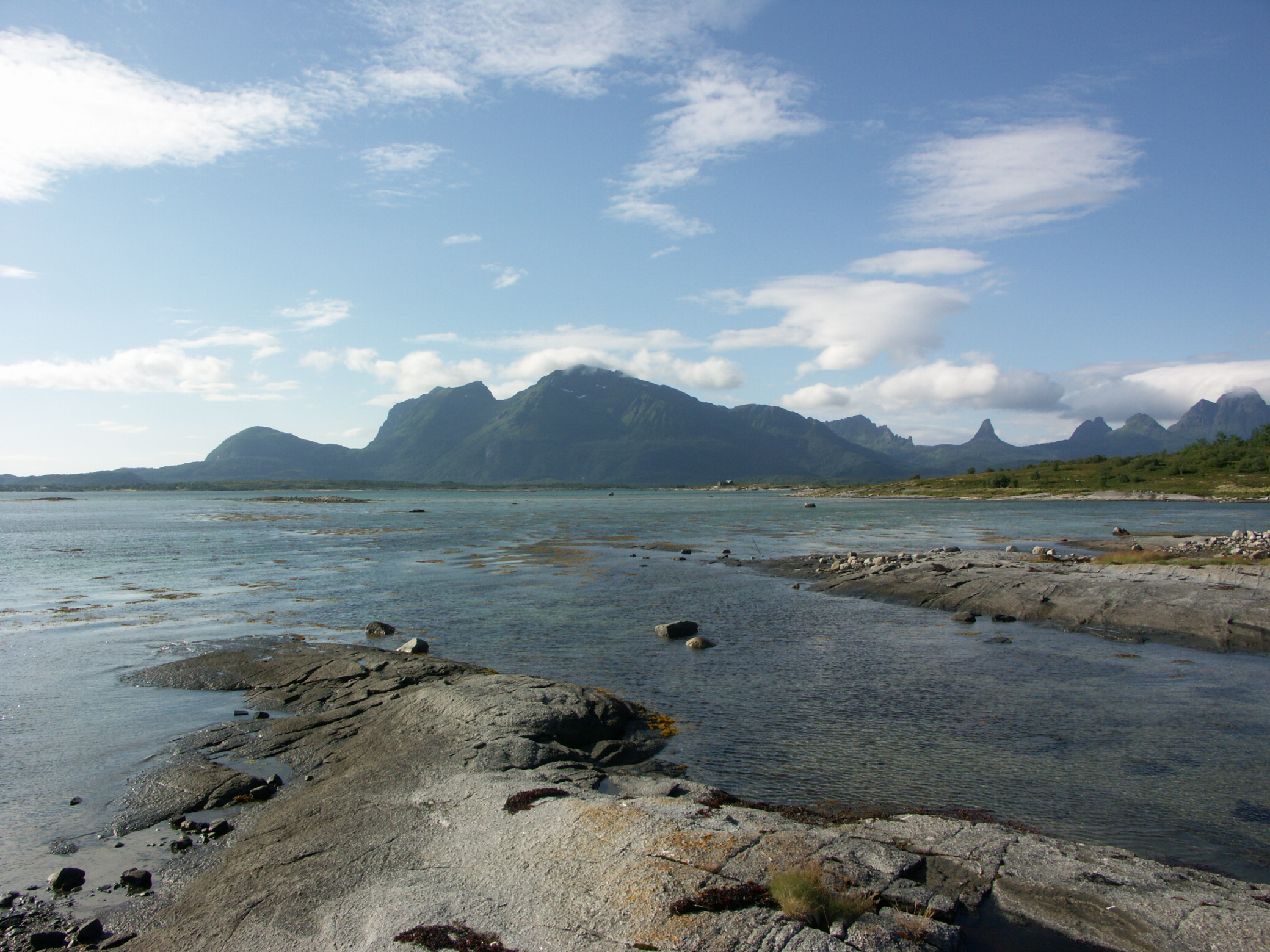
- Northwestern coast of Finnøya, with the coastal mountains of Hamarøy Municipality behind
- Interactive map of: Dirvik (Lule Sami); Finnøya (Norwegian)

Geography
- Location: Nordland, Norway
- Coordinates: 68.0022°N 15.4969°E
- Area: 68 km^{2} (26 sq mi)
- Highest elevation: 436 m (1430 ft)
- Highest point: Straumfjellet

Administration
- Norway
- County: Nordland
- Municipality: Hamarøy Municipality

Demographics
- Population: 75 (2016)

Finnøya (Norwegian) or Dirvik (Lule Sami) is an island in Hamarøy Municipality in Nordland county, Norway. The island is situated northwest of the village of Innhavet with which it is connected by bridge. The mountainous island has an area of 68 square kilometres (26 sq mi) and the highest point is the 436-metre (1,430 ft) tall mountain Straumfjellet. In 2016, the island of Finnøya had a population of 75.

Sagfjord Church is located on the south side of the island in the village of Karlsøy.
