= Adelaide Peninsula =

Peninsula in Nunavut, Canada

Location in Nunavut

Adelaide Peninsula (Iluilik), ancestral home to the Illuilirmiut Inuit, is a large peninsula in Nunavut, Canada. It is located at 68°06′N 097°48′W south of King William Island. Its namesake is Queen Adelaide, consort of King William IV of the United Kingdom.

In 1839 it was reached from the west by Peter Warren Dease and Thomas Simpson. Starvation Cove, on the northern tip of the peninsula, was the southernmost point any of the doomed survivors from Franklin's lost expedition of 1845-48 are known to have reached on their march south to find help.

== See also ==
- Royal eponyms in Canada
