= Queen Maud Gulf =

Bay in Nunavut, Canada

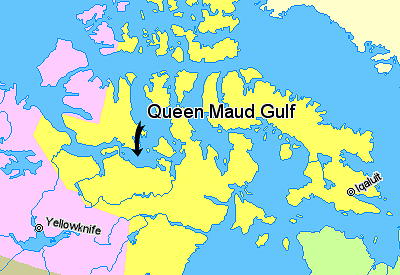

- Location of Queen Maud Gulf in Nunavut Location of Queen Maud Gulf in Canada
- Location: Nunavut, Canada
- Coordinates: 68°20′N 102°00′W
- Type: Gulf
- Ocean/sea sources: Arctic Ocean
- Basin countries: Canada
- Islands: Jenny Lind Island, King William Island, Royal Geographical Society Island

Designations

Ramsar Wetland
- Official name: Queen Maud Gulf
- Designated: 24 May 1982
- Reference no.: 246

Queen Maud Gulf lies between the northern coast of the mainland and the southeastern corner of Victoria Island in Nunavut, Canada. At its western end lies Cambridge Bay, leading to Dease Strait; to the east lies Simpson Strait; and to the north, Victoria Strait. It is home to the Queen Maud Gulf Migratory Bird Sanctuary.

== History ==
In 1839, it was crossed by Peter Warren Dease and Thomas Simpson. It was named by the Norwegian explorer Roald Amundsen in 1905 for the Norwegian queen Maud of Wales.

The wreck of HMS Erebus from Franklin's lost expedition of 1845 to find the Northwest Passage was found in 2014. The wreck lies at the bottom of the eastern portion of Queen Maud Gulf, west of O'Reilly Island.

== Islands ==
Islands in the Queen Maud Gulf include:

- Qikiqtaryuaq
- King William Island
- Royal Geographical Society Island

== See also ==
- Royal eponyms in Canada
