= David Heap =

British caver

- Born: 14 March 1941
- Died: 23 February 1995 (aged 53)
- Education: St Catharine's College, Cambridge

David Heap (14 March 1941 – 23 February 1995) was a largely responsible for the opening up and development of caving and potholing in Northern Norway in the 1960s and 1970s. He led a number of speleological expeditions to Norway, the French Pyrenees_{,} and Greece. He was the author of the Potholing Beneath the Northern Pennines.

After teaching history at Ermysted's Grammar in Skipton, he took a history lectureship at the University of Adelaide and extended his caving experience from the Yorkshire Dales to the Nullarbor region and Tasmania. After one year he returned to the UK and progressed to Headmaster at various secondary schools, notably William Hulme's Grammar, Manchester, Handsworth Grammar, Birmingham and King Edward VII School, Lytham St Annes.

The Station Master's House at Ribblehead became the David Heap Memorial Centre in 1999.

== Caver ==
As a pupil at Heversham Grammar school, in 1958 Heap gathered together friends to form The Kendal Caving Club.

He left Heversham in 1959 to read History and English at Cambridge, and became a leading member of the Cambridge University Caving Club, serving as its president.

Inspired by Marjorie Sweeting (an expert in Karst landscapes), Heap visited Arctic Norway on a Cambridge University expedition in 1961. This confirmed the possibility of significant cave development within the Arctic Circle. He led nine caving expeditions to Norway, which culminated in 1968/69 with the discovery and descent of the Ragge Javre Raige pothole near Musken, inside he Arctic Circle. The system is the deepest pothole and the deepest through trip in northern Europe, at 1900 feet. The deepest single pitch is around 500 feet.

Heap led the first exploration in Norway of the Oskhula/Kristihula cave system near Fauske. By 1969 four miles of passages to a depth of 520 feet had been explored, later extended to 9 miles and 1,000 feet deep, the longest cave in Norway.

Heap led overseas expeditions to Greece and to the French Pyrenees. In Greece the objective was the 1,400 feet deep Provatina Chasm in the Astraka Mountains. In the French Pyrenees in 1963 the target was to prove a connection between Gouffre Martel and La Grotte de la Cigalère. The expedition instead proved that such a connection could not exist.

At age 23 Heap published Potholing Beneath the Northern Pennines (RKP 1964), which attempted to define the spirit of caving as well as vividly describing various trips.

As a school teacher and headmaster Heap led expeditions to Norway with students from Ermysteds Grammar School. Notable amongst these students is Geoffrey Yeadon BEM, later President of Cave Diving Group UK.

Prior to his death, Heap made a bequest to his last school which allowed it to open the David Heap Memorial Outdoor Centre at Ribblehead.
