= Alfred Emden =

Alfred Emden may refer to:

- Alfred Brotherston Emden (1888–1979), English historian and principal of St Edmund Hall
- Alfred Charles Emden (1849–1911), British barrister and judge
