= Muskens =

Muskens or Müskens is a Dutch surname. Notable people with the surname include:

- Eefje Muskens (born 1989), Dutch badminton player
- Martinus Petrus Maria Muskens (1935–2013), Dutch Roman Catholic bishop
- Mirjam Müskens

== See also ==
- Musken, a village in Nordland, Norway
