= Henry Martindale =

Henry Martindale may refer to:

- Henry C. Martindale (1780–1860), American lawyer and politician from New York
- Henry Martindale (priest) (1879–1946), Archdeacon of Bombay
