= George Bernard Cronshaw =

George Bernard Cronshaw (1872–1928) was a Chaplain, Fellow and Bursar of The Queen's College Oxford University and later Principal of St Edmund Hall, Oxford. He was well known for his charitable works outside of university life holding governorships of several schools and his association with British hospitals especially the Radcliffe Infirmary in Oxford.

== Early life ==
George was the second son of Rev. Christopher Cronshaw, Canon of Manchester Cathedral. Raised in Lancashire, which now includes parts of Greater Manchester, he attended Manchester Grammar School and went up to Queen's College, Oxford as a Berry exhibitioner where he graduated with a first class in Chemistry. Leaving Oxford, he attended Leeds Clergy School and was subsequently ordained into a curacy in Holbeck, Leeds.

== Oxford career ==
George Cronshaw returned to Oxford in 1898 as Chaplain at his old college, Queen's whilst holding a curacy at St Cross Church, Holywell. He remained chaplain for thirty years during which time he strongly supported the college music society and choir. In 1900, resigned his curacy and was appointed lecturer in Chemistry, whereupon he organised the college chemistry laboratory in Queen's Lane.

In May 1902 he was elected a Fellow of the college, and in 1905 became Junior Bursar rising to Senior Bursar in 1912 at which time he relinquished all teaching responsibilities.

Outside of the college he was Junior Proctor for the University from 1909 to 1910 and served as a member of the Hebdomadal Council from 1911 until 1923. In addition, he acted as Visitor to the Museum, Acting Curator of the Schools and a member of the Boards of Natural History and Medicine. He was also chairman and secretary of the Committee of College Bursars. As treasurer of St Hugh's College, Oxford he oversaw their move to the current premises in Banbury Road

== Schools and hospitals ==
Outside of university he was a member of the governing bodies of King Edward VI School, Southampton and both Heversham and Keswick Schools. He was chairman of governors for St. Bees School.

From 1910 to 1928 he was chairman and treasurer of the committee for the Radcliffe Infirmary whilst being a member of the committee of the British Hospital Association. At the Radcliffe, he helped to establish the throat and ear, maternity and electrical departments. He helped to obtain for the hospital the Headington Manor House and Children's Convalescent Home in Cowley and established a countywide contributory scheme that put the hospital on a sound financial footing. It was for such achievements that the Oxford City Council recommended that the freedom of the City be conferred upon him.

== Church and freemasonry ==
In church life, he undertook the duties of examining chaplain to a number of dioceses: to the Bishop of Chichester from 1919 to 1921 and from 1921 to the Bishop of Carlisle. It was observed that he would often cycle 10 or 20 miles out of Oxford on a Sunday to preach or take service in a county parish. He married late in life (1925) to Dorothy Wardle of Scarthwaite near Lancaster, Lancashire; they had no children.

An active freemason, Cronshaw was three times Master of the Apollo University Lodge, Grand Senior Warden of the Provincial Grand Lodge of Oxfordshire and Grand Chaplain in the Grand Lodge of England.

== St Edmund Hall ==
George Cronshaw's continuous hard work took its toll on his health and after a bout of influenza in 1928 he was offered, in May of that year, the position of Principal of St Edmund Hall, Oxford which at that time still had close ties to Queen's College. In accepting the position, upon the retirement of G.B. Allan, he agreed to give up all his other duties and appointments. However, it was too late to save his health; he took to his bed ill, weeks after his appointment, and he died in his residence at the Hall on 20 December.

He was succeeded as Principal by A.B. Emden who had himself only recently been appointed to Vice-Principal.
