= Alfred Charles Emden =

British judge

Alfred Charles Richard Emden (1849 – 18 February 1911) was a barrister and County Court judge, best remembered as the author of the building law text The Law relating to Building Leases and Building Contracts. This text gave rise to the Emden Formula, used to measure head office costs in construction delay claims, an alternative to the better-known Hudson Formula.

== Life ==
Emden was born in 1849, the third son of William S. Emden. He was educated at King's School, Canterbury and in Paris under Professor Meliot. He entered the Inner Temple as Barrister in 1880. His publications included the Law of Building, The Practice in Winding up Companies, Complete Collection of Practice Statutes, Various Digests of Cases, and several articles on legal reform.

Judge Emden was noted for the rapidity with which he dealt with cases before his court. He was often at odds with his fellow judges in the matter of case congestion. In the latter years of his life, a disagreement with a junior counsel caused severe comments regarding his conduct to be made by the Lord Chief Justice of England.

He was a member of the Savage Club and his recreations included motoring and golf. He lived in Crowborough, Sussex and Bromley, Kent.

Emden's son was Alfred Brotherston Emden, the well known Principal of St Edmund Hall, Oxford.

Judge Emden died on 18 February 1911.

== Selected bibliography ==
- The Law relating to Building Leases and Building Contracts, first published by Stevens and Haynes in London in 1882. Subsequent editions appeared into the 1980s
- Emden, A.C.R. (1882) The law relating to building leases and building contracts, the improvement of land by, and the construction of, buildings, London: Stevens and Haynes, 716 p. (6th Ed. by W.H. Gill published in 1962)
- Emden, A.C.R. (1883) The practice in winding-up companies: a concise and practical treatise upon the law and practice relating to the winding-up of companies from the commencement of the winding-up proceedings to dissolution, London: William Clowes and Sons, 385p. (8th Ed. by H. Johnston published in 1909)
- Emden, A.C.R. and Pearce-Edgcumbe, E.R., Sir (1885) A complete collection of practice statutes orders and rules. Being a selection of such practical parts of all statutes, orders, and rules, as are now in force, and relate to the practice and procedure of the Supreme Court. From 1275 to 1885, London: Stevens & Haynes, 1378 p.
