= Dallam School =

Location
- Main Street; Milnthorpe, Cumbria, LA7 7DD; England; 54°13′43″N 2°46′07″W

Information
- Type: Comprehensive; Academy
- Motto: Learning for all, learning for life
- Established: 1984
- Local authority: Westmorland and Furness
- Department for Education URN: 137205 Tables
- Ofsted: Reports
- Headteacher: Steve Henneberry
- Gender: Coeducational
- Age: 11 to 18
- Enrolment: ~1050
- Houses: Heversham Owls Leasgill Wolves Milnthorpe Deer
- Website: dallamschool.co.uk

Dallam School is a co-educational 11-18 secondary school with academy status, located in Milnthorpe, Cumbria, England. It was founded in 1984 through the merger of Heversham Grammar School (established in 1613) and Milnthorpe Secondary School.

== History ==
Heversham Grammar School was founded and endowed on 24 January 1619/20, by Edward Wilson, Kt (1557-1653), of Nether Levens, who also owned Heversham Hall. It occupied the site known in recent years as Old School, above and behind the village church, on Heversham Head. The building is now a private house. The present ivy-clad Boarding House and Big School (formerly the school hall) date from the 1880s.

Milnthorpe Secondary School was founded in 1951 and, after occupying many different buildings around the village, moved to Dallam's current location in 1968, complete with Community Centre.

Dallam School was founded in 1984 through the merger of Heversham Grammar School and Milnthorpe Secondary School.

Dallam is a boarding school, the boarding house being on a separate site from that of the main school.

In 2002, Mr Steven Holdup became Headteacher of the school.

In 2010, the school brought the PE department down from the Heversham site with an all-weather astroturf pitch, and new sports facilities.

In 2013, Mr William Bancroft became Headteacher of the school.

In 2018, Mr Nigel Whittle became Headteacher of the school.

In 2019, Ms Julie O'Connor became Executive Headteacher of the school.

In 2021, Ms Rachael Williams became Headteacher of the school.

In 2023, Mr Steven Henneberry became Headteacher of the school.

== Sixth form ==
Dallam School has a sixth form, which offers A-levels and BTECs

The subjects offered are:

- Art and Design
- Biology
- Business Studies
- Chemistry
- Computing
- Criminology
- Drama and Theatre Studies
- English Language
- English Literature
- French
- Further Mathematics (AS Level)
- Geography
- Health and Social Care
- History
- Mathematics
- Media Studies
- Music
- PE
- Physics
- Product Design
- Psychology
- Sociology
- Spanish
- Travel and Tourism

== Notable alumni ==
=== Heversham Grammar School ===
- Thomas Bethell (1867–1957): barrister and politician
- Ephraim Chambers (c. 1680–1740): writer and encyclopaedist
- George Bernard Cronshaw (1872–1928) (as member of the School's governing body): clergyman and academic
- Kim Fletcher (b. 1956): journalist and newspaper editor
- David Heap (1941–1995): speleologist
- Burnham Hodgson (1926–2020): Archdeacon of West Cumberland
- John Hudson (1773–1843): mathematician and clergyman
- Timothy Leighton (b. 1963): scientist and inventor
- Henry Martindale (1879–1946): Archdeacon of Bombay
- William Preston (1729–1789): Irish Anglican bishop
- J. A. Ratcliffe (1902–1987): radio physicist
- Sam, Martin and Julian Rayner of Lakeland Limited
- Charles Riley (1854–1929): Anglican Archbishop of Perth, Western Australia
- John Young Stratton (1829/30–1905): author, essayist, social reformer and campaigner against rural poverty
- Richard Watson (1737–1816): academic and Bishop of Llandaff
- William Whewell (1794–1866): scientist, theologian
- Guy Willatt (1918–2003) (as teacher): cricketer

=== Dallam School ===
- James Knox (cyclist) (b. 1995): road racing cyclist with the Belgian Soudal–Quick-Step team

== See also ==
- List of the oldest schools in the United Kingdom
