= Hudson Formula =

The Hudson Formula derives from Hudson's Building and Engineering Contracts and is used for the assessment of delay damages in construction claims.

The formula is:

(Head Office overheads + profit percentage) ÷ 100 x contract sum ÷ period in weeks x delay in weeks

The head office overheads and profits percentage is that which would have been submitted in a tender.

A claimant must prove a necessity to maintain resources on the project and an inability to re-allocate them to more profitable work and must give evidence of the processes within the head office to enable an assessment of the portion of overheads, if any, that are attributable to the delay caused by the breach.

In the alternative Emden Formula, only the actual head office overheads percentage is used.
