= William Taylor (Lollard) =

William Taylor (died 1423) was a medieval English theologian and priest, executed as a Lollard.

Nothing is known of Taylor's career before he named as Principal of St Edmund Hall, Oxford in a rent roll for 1405–1406. One sermon from 1406 survives, and was republished by the Early English Text Society in 1993.

Taylor next appears as a longstanding excommunicate on 12 February 1420 before Archbishop Chichele. On 14 February he was absolved from his excommunication. On 11 February 1423 he was again brought before Chichele, and this time was convicted; on 1 March 1423 was stripped of his status as a priest. The next day he was burnt at Smithfield.

== Sources ==
- Anne Hudson, ed., Two Wycliffite Texts: The Sermon of William Taylor, 1406 — The Testimony of William Thorpe, 1407 (Early English Text Society 301, Oxford, 1993) ISBN 0-19-722303-6
- Lee, Sidney, ed. (1898). "Taylor, William (d.1423)" . Dictionary of National Biography. Vol. 55. London: Smith, Elder & Co.
