= Raggejavreraige =

Cave in Norway

Coordinates: 67.8777°N 16.2508°E

Raggejavreraige or Råggejávrrerájgge is a cave located in a mountain above the Hellemofjorden in Hamarøy Municipality in Nordland county, Norway. The cave is located near the lake Råggejávrre, about 2 kilometres (1.2 mi) south of the village of Musken. Råggejávrrerájgge is a limestone cave that has been eroded by this underground river. At 580 metres (1,900 ft) deep, it is the deepest cave in Scandinavia and the only known deep cave north of the Arctic Circle.

== Regional Setting ==
Generally, the area is a vast plateau (exceeding an elevation of 700 metres (2,300 ft) above sea level) that is incised by the steep-walled Tysfjorden. Within the impermeable rock, there are three two-dimensional stripes of marble that run from the top of the plateau to below sea level (the fjord is 450 metres or 1,480 feet deep), and continue on the other side. Raggejavreraige is located on the south side of the fjord within the westernmost stripe. In places, the cave occupies the entire width of the marble, which does not exceed 30 metres (98 ft).

Road access to the cave is limited. The nearest road ends at the village of Drag (via Bodø), about 18 kilometres (11 mi) to the north. From Drag, there is scheduled boat service that can be taken to the small village of Musken. Accommodations at the local school and arrangements for trailhead drop-off and pickup by motor-boat can be arranged from Musken. After a stiff hike on a good trail up to an elevation of 600 metres (2,000 ft) the upper entrance area is reached.

== Cave Description ==
Surface water atop the plateau sinks where it encounters the marble, but the accessible entrance to Raggejavreraige ("RJR") is some 100 metres (330 ft) away, a short distance above the shallow valley floor. This entrance is not particularly distinctive, but its strong, inward gust of wind erases any doubt that it is a large cave. The cave consists of about 2 kilometres (1.2 mi) of passages that alternate between steep rifts or shafts and horizontal or low-slope passages.

RJR's dominant feature is the 152-metre (499 ft) Storstupet ("Big Shaft"). All of the water falls down a parallel shaft only a few metres away. The Ulvgangen ("Wolf Walk") traverses across the cascades at the mouth of this wet shaft to the dry Storstupet. A pulldown descent of Storstupet is complicated by its low angle (about 80 degrees), and many teams prefer to detackle this pitch from above. Halfway down Storstupet is a window connecting back with the wet shaft, so descending cavers can enjoy all of the sound and fury of the wet shaft in relative comfort. All of the water from the parallel shaft sinks into the floor at its bottom, and is not seen again in the cave.

RJR's other major shaft is the impressive 100-metre (330 ft) Litlestupet (Little Shaft), reduced to 30 metres (98 ft) by a partial bypass known as Knivgangen ("Razor Passage"). Unlike Storstupet, Litlestupet is dry, quiet, and free-hanging.

As there are three entrances, cavers conducting a through-trip from the upper entrance at 582 metres (1,909 ft) above sea level can exit at the Mistral exit at 80 metres (260 ft) above sea level or at the lowest exit which is in a cliff a mere 3 metres (9.8 ft) above the fjord.

== Exploration ==
Norwegian geologist Steinar Foslie visited the RJR area in the late 1930s, and noted the presence of sinking streams resurging at sea level. In 1968, British caver David Heap of the Kendal Cave Club and Ulv Holbye (after whom Ulvgangen is named) led a school party to about 180 metres (590 ft) partway down Storstupet, which was descended the next year by a KCC party using a winch, completing exploration of most of the cave and exiting via the middle entrance. The connection between the two lower entrances was made by a British team in 1979.

Doubts about the accuracy of the cave survey (stated depth was anywhere between 575 and 630 metres or 1,886 and 2,067 feet) led to a resurvey of most of the cave by Stein-Erik Lauritzen and others in 1991, which corrected the depth of the cave to 580 metres (1,900 ft). The entrances to the cave are located at elevations of 582 metres (1,909 ft), 80 metres (260 ft), and 3 metres (9.8 ft) above sea level, with the low point of the cave at 2 metres (6 ft 7 in) above sea level. The cave is known to resurge below sea level.
