= Henry Martindale (priest) =

Archdeacon of Mumbai from 1927 to 1933

Henry Martindale (1879–1946) was Archdeacon of Bombay from 1927 until 1933.

Martindale was educated at The Friends School, Kendall, Heversham Grammar School, Keble College, Oxford and Lincoln Theological College. He was with the Bank of Liverpool from 1895 to 1906; and served in the Second Boer War with the St John Ambulance Brigade. He was ordained deacon in 1910 and priest in 1911. After curacies in Kentish Town and Lower Edmonton, he was chaplain at Parel (India) during 1915, then a chaplain to the British Armed Forces in Mesopotamia from 1916 until 1919.

After his years as Archdeacon he held Incumbencies at East Barnet and Woburn. He died on 10 April 1946.
