= St Edmund Hall, Oxford =

College of the University of Oxford

St Edmund Hall
- University of Oxford
- Arms: Or, a cross patonce gules cantoned by four Cornish choughs proper
- Location: The High / Queen's Lane
- Coordinates: 51.753°N 1.25°W
- Full name: The Principal, Fellows and Scholars of Saint Edmund Hall in the University of Oxford
- Latin name: Aula Sancti Edmundi
- Established: c. 1278; 748 years ago
- Named for: Edmund of Abingdon
- Sister college: Fitzwilliam College, Cambridge
- Principal: Katherine Willis, Baroness Willis of Summertown
- Undergraduates: 376
- Postgraduates: 315
- Endowment: £68.2 million (2020)
- Website: www.seh.ox.ac.uk
- JCR: jcr.seh.ox.ac.uk
- MCR: mcr.seh.ox.ac.uk
- Boat club: sehbc.org

Map
- Location within Oxford city centre

St Edmund Hall (also known as The Hall and Teddy Hall) is a constituent college of the University of Oxford. The college claims to be "the oldest surviving academic society to house and educate undergraduates in any university" and was the last surviving medieval academic hall at the university.

The college is on Queen's Lane and the High Street, in central Oxford. After more than seven centuries as a men-only college, it became coeducational in 1979. As of 2020, the college had a financial endowment of £68.2 million.

Notable alumni of St Edmund Hall include former British prime minister Keir Starmer, diplomats Robert Macaire and Mark Sedwill, politicians Richard Onslow, 1st Baron Onslow and Mel Stride, as well as journalists Samira Ahmed (1986, English) and Anna Botting (1986, Geography). Honorary Fellows include the structural engineer Faith Wainwright (1980, Engineering) and the lawyer Elizabeth Hollingworth (1984, BCL).

In 2019, St Edmund Hall launched its 10-year strategy to improve access to higher education, increase the number of student scholarships, bursaries and academic fellowships at the Hall and improve its estate facilities and sustainability credentials. This was followed by the launch of HALLmarks, a £50 million campaign in 2022 to fundraise for a new student accommodation building at Norham Gardens in North Oxford as well as student support and fellowship endowment projects.

== History ==
=== Foundation ===
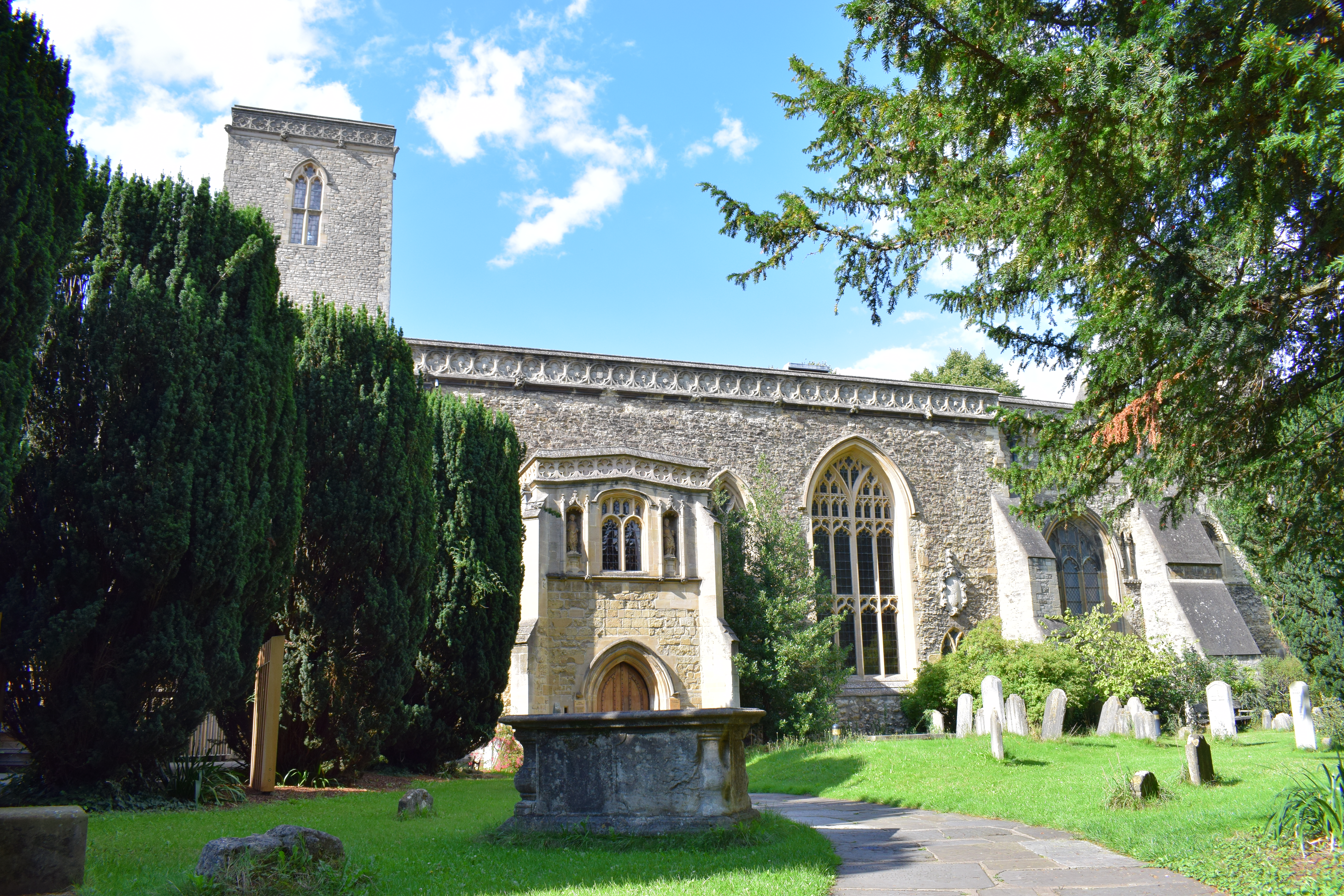
The church of St Peter-in-the-East — now the college library

Similar to the University of Oxford itself, the precise date of establishment of St Edmund Hall is not certain; it is usually estimated at 1236, before any other college was formally established, though the founder from whom the Hall takes its name, locally-born Edmund of Abingdon, the first known Oxford Master of Arts and the first Oxford-educated Archbishop of Canterbury, lived and taught on the college site as early as the 1190s.

The name St Edmund Hall (Aula Sancti Edmundi) first appears in a 1317 rental agreement. Before that, the house appeared as the ‘house of Cowley’ in rental agreements with the abbey. Thomas of Malsbury, the Vicar of Cowley, partially conveyed the site and its buildings to the abbey in 1270-71, having purchased it for eight pounds nine years previously. Cowley fully conveyed the property to the abbey in 1289–90 with an annuity of 'thirteen shillings and fourpence' (i.e. one "mark") paid to himself and eight shillings for his niece.

During the thirteenth century, the university encouraged masters of the arts to rent properties to take in scholars as their tenants. The university preferred such arrangements over private lodgings, which it linked to loose living, poor discipline, public disorder and fighting. Moreover, university-approved accommodation run by approved principals, gave the university more oversight. Principals leased the halls annually and had to present themselves in front of the university's chancellor in St Mary's church yearly and guarantee that their hall would pay its rent. Halls whose principals undertook this formality earned recognition as academic halls. John de Cornuba leased the Hall from Osney Abbey, a large Augustinian institution in the neighbouring town of Osney, for 35 shillings annually.

The Abbey's rent collections varied from 15 shillings for small institutions to four pounds for larger institutions. Judging by the Hall's annual rent sum, St Edmund's was a small to medium-sized academic hall at the time. However, by 1324-5 Osney Abbey had raised the Hall's rent to 46/8 while rents for other student halls in the city had fallen. The rent increase indicates that the site expanded after 1318. Letters sent to Osney showed that the abbey gained two additional plots of land and buildings adjacent to the Hall and leased it to St Edmund Hall. The acquisition increased the Hall's capacity and also gave it access to the well which forms the centrepiece of the quadrangle.

St Edmund Hall began as one of Oxford's ancient Aularian houses, the medieval halls that laid the University's foundation, preceding the creation of the first colleges. As the only surviving medieval hall, its members are known as Aularians.

=== Lollardism ===
The college has a history of independent thought, which brought it into frequent conflict with both Church and State. During the late 14th and early 15th centuries, it was a bastion of John Wycliffe's supporters, pejoratively referred to as Lollards. This group of reformists challenged Papal supremacy, condemning practices such as Clerical celibacy, offerings to effigies, confession, and pilgrimage. They also believed that transubstantiation was tantamount to necromancy and felt that the Church's pursuit of arts and crafts was wasteful. However, it was their early Bible translations and belief that everyone should have access to scriptures which they were primarily known for. Ultimately, Lollardism would assimilate with Protestantism in the 1500s culminating in King Henry VIII's English Reformation.

The Hall's reformist activities caught the attention of Archbishop Thomas Arundel who opposed Lollardism. Arundel witnessed a sermon given by Principal William Taylor at St Paul's Cross in 1406 or 1407 and summoned him. However, Taylor failed to appear and was subsequently excommunicated for contumacy. Following his excommunication, Taylor embarked on a career as a Lollard preacher. In 1419/20 Archbishop Chichele absolved Taylor after he confessed to preaching whilst excommunicated. However, he was arrested soon thereafter for espousing unorthodox opinions in Bristol's Holy Trinity Church. Subsequently, Taylor was declared a relapsed heretic, handed over to the secular courts and burnt at the stake.

Taylor's successor Peter Payne, also a Lollard, continued supporting Wycliffe's opinions. It is believed that Payne was partly converted to Lollardism by John Purvey, one of Wycliffe's original supporters. Purvey advocated for vernacular translations of the Bible, and compelled Payne to defend Wycliffe's translations of the scriptures. Payne drew hostility from Oxford's friars after allegedly purloining the University's common seal and using it to seal a letter sent to the ecclesiastical reformer Jan Hus in Prague. His letter claimed that Oxford and all of England barring the friars shared the same views that Hus's supporters (the Hussites) shared in Prague. The letter also commended Wycliffe's life and teachings and because he sealed it with the University's seal the Hussites accepted it as genuine.

Arundel deemed the college's activities dangerous enough to warrant an intervention and suppression. Arundel began by banning Oxford's schools from using Wycliffe's texts unless approved by a committee and ordered that all of Oxford's principals make monthly inquiries to make sure their scholars' views were orthodox. Next, he ordered each committee to go through Wycliffe's writings and draw up a list of errors and heresys which he presented to the King. The King wrote to the university ordering that anyone holding reformist opinions be placed in prison. Payne fled the country after he left Oxford in 1412.

=== Seventeenth century onwards ===
In the late 17th and 18th centuries, St Edmund Hall incurred the wrath of the Crown for fostering non-jurors, men who remained loyal to the Jacobite succession of the House of Stuart and who refused to take the oath to their successors after 1688, whom they regarded as having usurped the British throne.

In 1877, Prime Minister Benjamin Disraeli appointed commissioners to consider and implement reform of the university and its colleges and halls. The commissioners concluded that the four remaining medieval halls were not viable and should merge with colleges on the death or resignation of the incumbent principals. In 1881, the commissioners issued University Statutes which provided for a partial merger of St Edmund with Queen's College and for the other halls to merge with colleges.

By 1903, only St Edmund Hall remained. Principal Edward Moore wished to retire and become a resident canon in Canterbury Cathedral. Queen's College proposed an amended statute for complete rather than partial merger, which was rejected by the Congregation. In 1912 a statute was passed preserving the independence of the hall, which enabled Moore to retire. Queen Elizabeth II approved St Edmund Hall's charter of incorporation as a full college of the University of Oxford in 1957, although it deliberately retained its ancient title of "Hall". The Duke of Edinburgh presented the royal charter to the college in June 1958.

In 1978, women were first admitted as members of the Hall, with the first matriculations of women in 1979. In 2015, the college celebrated the matriculation of its 3000th female student with events and exhibitions, including the display of portraits of notable women who had taught, studied or worked at the Hall in the Dining Hall, a noticeable change from the styles of portraits in most colleges. Between 2015 and 2017, the proportion of UK undergraduates admitted to St Edmund Hall who were women was 42.3%.

== Buildings and grounds ==
St Edmund Hall is located in central Oxford, on the north side of the High Street, off Queen's Lane. It borders New College to the North and the Carrodus Quad of The Queen's College to the south. The front quadrangle houses the porters' lodge, the Old Dining Hall, built in the 1650s, the college bar (the buttery), the chapel, the Old Library, offices and accommodation for students and Fellows.

=== Entrance ===
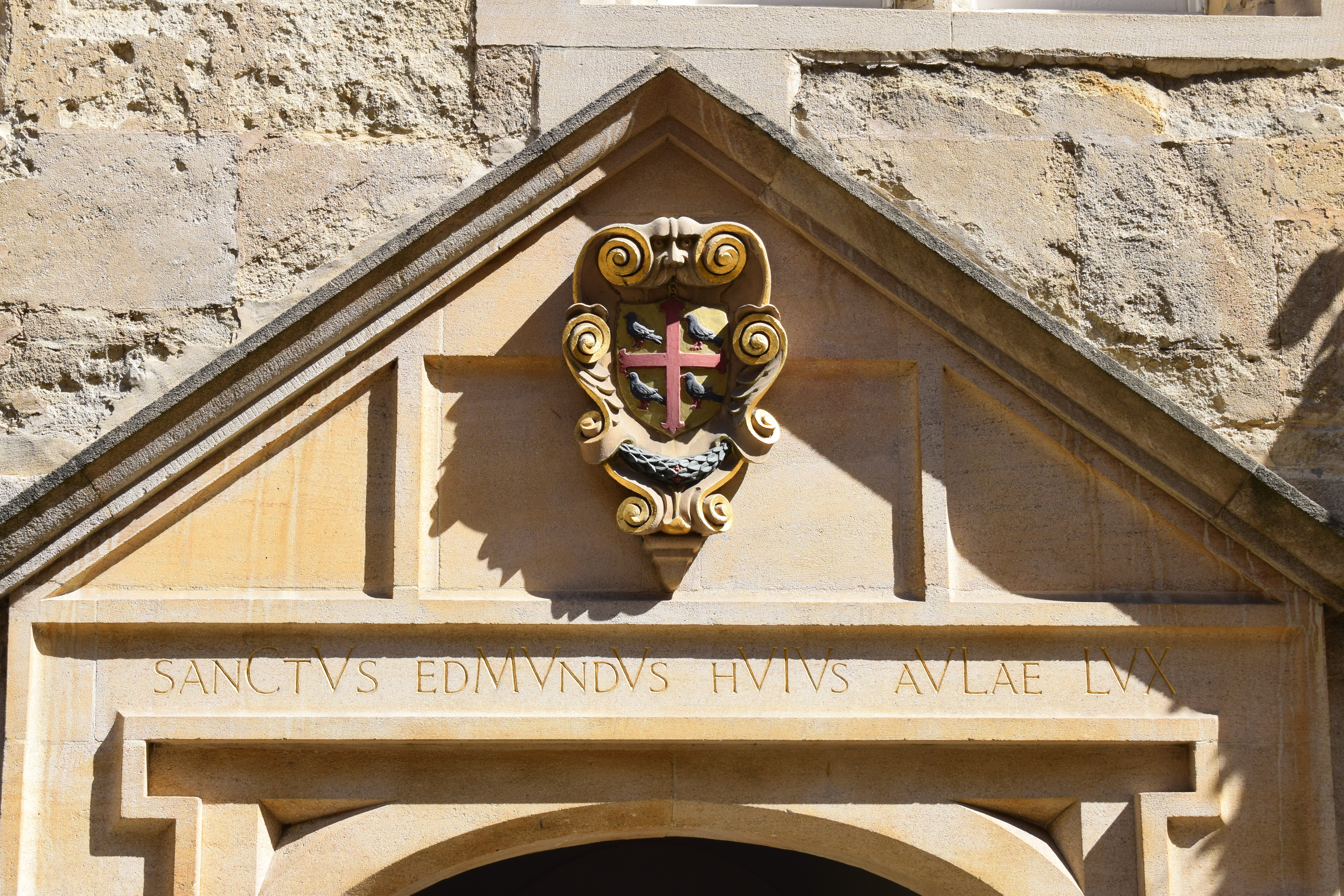
Coat of Arms sculpture above the entrance to the Porters' Lodge

An engraving of the college coat of arms is found above the entrance to the college on Queen's Lane. As seen in this image, the coat of arms sits above the following Latin dedication "sanctus edmundus huius aulae lux", or "St Edmund, light of this Hall".

It is a common practice within the University to use chronograms for dedications. When transcribed into Latin, they are written in such a way that an important date, usually that of a foundation or the dedication itself, is embedded in the text in Roman numerals.

In the above dedication, the text is rendered as

sanCtVs edMVndVs hVIVs aVLae LVX

and, in this case, adding the numerals gives:

C + V + M + V + V + V + I + V + V + L + L + V + X = 1246

(For this reading one must disregard the usual "subtractive" convention — according to which, for example, "IV" would be 4, not 6.) The year 1246 is the date of the canonisation of St Edmund of Abingdon.

=== Well ===
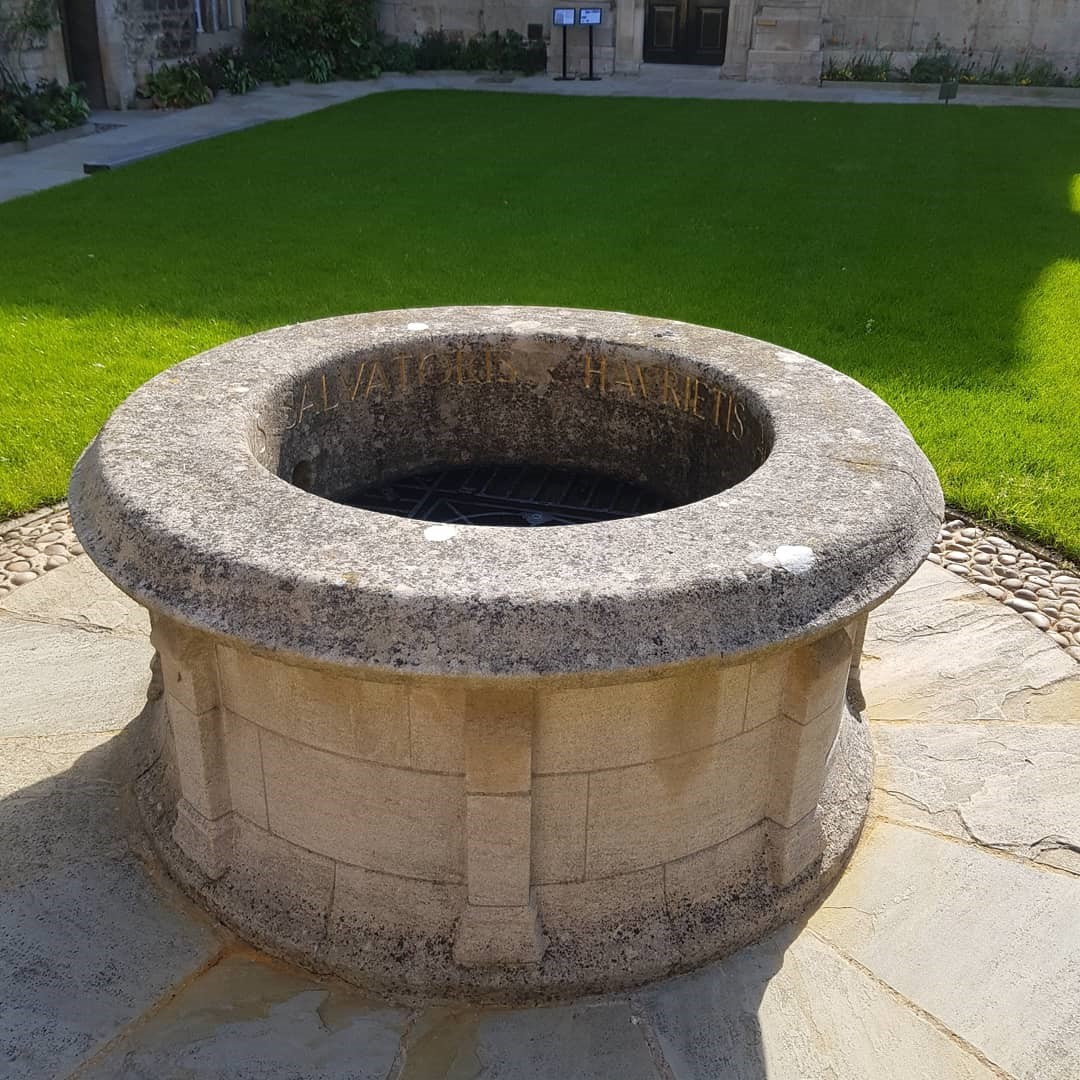
20th-century wellhead over a medieval well in the front quadrangle

In the centre of the quadrangle is a medieval well, which was uncovered in 1926 during the construction of a new lecture room and accommodation. A new wellhead was added, with the Latin inscription HAURIETIS AQUAS IN GAUDIO DE FONTIBUS SALVATORIS, "You will draw waters with joy from the fountains of the Saviour". These words, from Isaiah 12:3, are believed to have been spoken by St Edmund on his deathbed in Salisbury. A metal grate was added to the well to prevent injuries, but water can still be seen below it at a depth of about nine feet. Plans to add a wooden frame and bucket were abandoned, to maintain the overall appearance of the quadrangle.

=== Chapel ===
The east side of the Front Quad contains the chapel, consecrated in 1682. The chapel contains a stained glass window which is one of the earliest works by the artists Sir Edward Burne-Jones and William Morris, and a painting above the altar named The Supper at Emmaus, by Ceri Richards. Often described as a 'marmite painting' due to its anachronous style within the chapel, the painting commemorates the granting of the college's Royal Charter. The organ was built by Wood of Huddersfield in the 1980s. The St Edmund Hall Chapel Choir consists of eight choral scholars, two organ scholars and many other non-auditioning singers. The choir goes on two annual tours, including trips to Wells Cathedral in 2017, Pontigny, France, the burial place of St Edmund, in 2016 and Warsaw, Poland in 2015.

=== Old Library ===
Above the chapel is the Old Library. It was the last among Oxford colleges to chain its valuable books, but the first to have shelves against the walls. The Old Library is no longer the main library of the Hall, but is used for events and for research.

=== Library ===
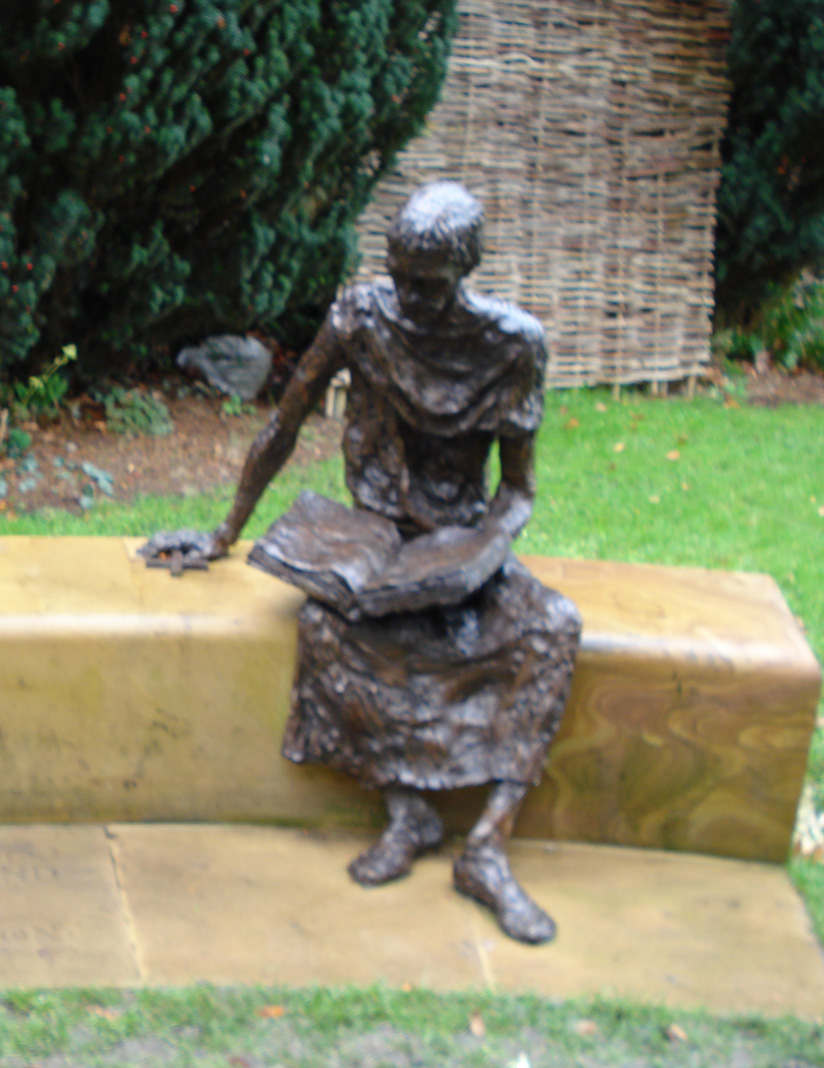
St Edmund of Abingdon

The college library, in the deconsecrated 12th-century church of St Peter-in-the-East, was converted in the 1970s, and includes the 14th-century tower, which houses a tutor's room at the top. The oldest part of the library still standing is the crypt below the church, which dates from the 1130s. The library is situated in the original churchyard of St Peter-in-the-East. 40,000 volumes are housed within it to cater to the wide variety of courses offered at the Hall. While many of the graves have had their contents disinterred, several gravestones remain including one belonging to balloonist James Sadler, the first English aeronaut, and another which states the occupant died upon 31 February. The garden contains a seated bronze sculpture of St Edmund as an impoverished student.

=== Modern buildings ===
In 1934, the Oxford-based architect Fielding Dodd completed the south side of the college's quadrangle, marking the 700th anniversary of Edmund of Abingdon's consecration as the Archbishop of Canterbury. In 1965–9, Kenneth Stevens and Partners, inheritors of Dodd's architectural practice, worked on a large programme of new building at the college, including a new dining hall, common rooms, teaching facilities, and undergraduate accommodation. These are at the rear of the main site in the Kelly, Emden, Besse, and Whitehall buildings. All first-year undergraduate students are guaranteed accommodation on the main site and many return for their third year after living out, usually in East Oxford, for the duration of their second year. The Wolfson Hall, the 20th-century dining hall, seats approximately 230 people and is used by students on a daily basis for breakfast, lunch and dinner.

=== Annexes ===
The college also owns annexes at Norham Gardens, on Dawson Street, and on Iffley Road.

The Norham Gardens annexe includes the Graduate Centre, a complex consisting of several large Victorian villas, including Gunfield. This site was for many years the home of St Stephen's House, Oxford, before that institution moved to Iffley Road in 1980. The Norham Gardens annexe has the capacity to house most first-year graduate students and has its own common room, IT facilities, gardens and gym. In addition to student rooms, the Graduate Centre also has a quantity of faculty housing. The Dawson Street and Iffley Road annexes host undergraduates who do not live on the main site in pleasant en-suite, self-catering rooms.

== Student life ==
As of 2017, the college has roughly 410 undergraduate, 300 graduate students and 75 Fellows, organised into three common rooms. The Junior Common Room (JCR), for undergraduates, and Middle Common Room (MCR), for postgraduates, both organise regular events, including a Freshers' week programme, dinners and film nights.

=== Creative writing ===
The college has a weekly creative writing workshop, a termly poetry reading series, an online writers' forum and The St Edmund Hall Gallery, the annual student arts and literary magazine. College students also run 'TART' or 'Teddy Art' another arts and culture magazine.

The college runs an annual journalism competition for Oxford University students, in memory of alumnus and promising young journalist Philip Geddes, who died in the IRA bombing of Harrods in 1983. The college also hosts an annual lecture in his name.

=== Drama ===
St Edmund Hall has a drama society called the John Oldham Society, which worked in Cameroon in 2013 on a community drama project. In 2019-20 the John Oldham Society staged a production of The Importance of Being Earnest, with the profits being donated to Stonewall.

=== Music ===
The College has one of the largest non-auditioning college choirs in Oxford, with two Organ Scholars and eight Choral Scholars. This was under the direction of James Whitbourn, the Director of Music, until his death in 2024. The choir performs an evensong every Sunday and on special occasions, including the Feast Day of St Edmund and the popular 'Carols in the Quad' event at Christmas. The Choir take part in an annual exchange with Fitzwilliam College, Cambridge.

=== Sport ===
St Edmund Hall participates in a large number of sports including rugby, football, rowing, tennis, cricket, mixed lacrosse, netball, hockey, swimming, gymnastics, and basketball, among others. Since becoming a college in 1957, the Men's Rugby Union team has won over half the Cuppers Tournaments it has ever entered (33 wins from 62 attempts).

The college rowing team, St Edmund Hall Boat Club (SEHBC), held the men's headship in Summer Eights five times between 1959 and 1965 and women's headship from 2006 to 2009. SEHBC had success at the Henley Royal Regatta during its era of dominance in Oxford rowing in the 1960s.

The college celebrates the students’ successes in sports, arts and other extra-curricular activities at the annual Achievements Dinner. Cuppers winning teams are also rewarded with their photograph in the college bar, the walls of which are now filled with teams dating from the late nineteenth century to the present day. The college awards the Luddington Prize to undergraduate students who manage to achieve both a First Class degree in finals and a university Blue.

== Outreach ==
The College has a very active outreach and access programme, employing two full-time staff and supported by a team of over 30 volunteer Student Ambassadors. Working with schools in the assigned link areas, including Leicestershire, Rutland, Derby and Derbyshire, the College hosts visits from school groups and was one of the first colleges to take student ambassadors on an access roadshow. This saw four students and the Schools Liaison Officer visit nine schools in 4 days in Hampshire and the Isle of Wight in 2016 (previous link regions) and continues to take place annually. In 2023, the College launched its Unlock Oxford programme which aims to support students from backgrounds underrepresented at Oxford and increase the number of applications from its link areas.

== Formal Hall and college graces ==
The usual grace given before Formal Hall, as said by the fellow presiding at the dinner, is:

Benedictus Benedicat per Jesum Christum Dominum Nostrum
(May the Blessed One bless [this food] through Jesus Christ Our Lord)

The post cibum grace, given following pudding, is a slight variant on the above:

Benedicto Benedicatur per Jesum Christum Dominum Nostrum
(May the Blessed One be blessed through Jesus Christ Our Lord)

To which the assembly responds Amen. More extended (or sung) forms of the grace are sometimes given but these are limited to special occasions, such as the Feast of St Edmund, a formal held each year to commemorate the namesake of the hall.

The traditional college toast is occasionally also said at dinners, and is simply "Floreat Aula", Latin for "May the Hall Flourish".

== People associated with the college ==
=== Notable alumni ===
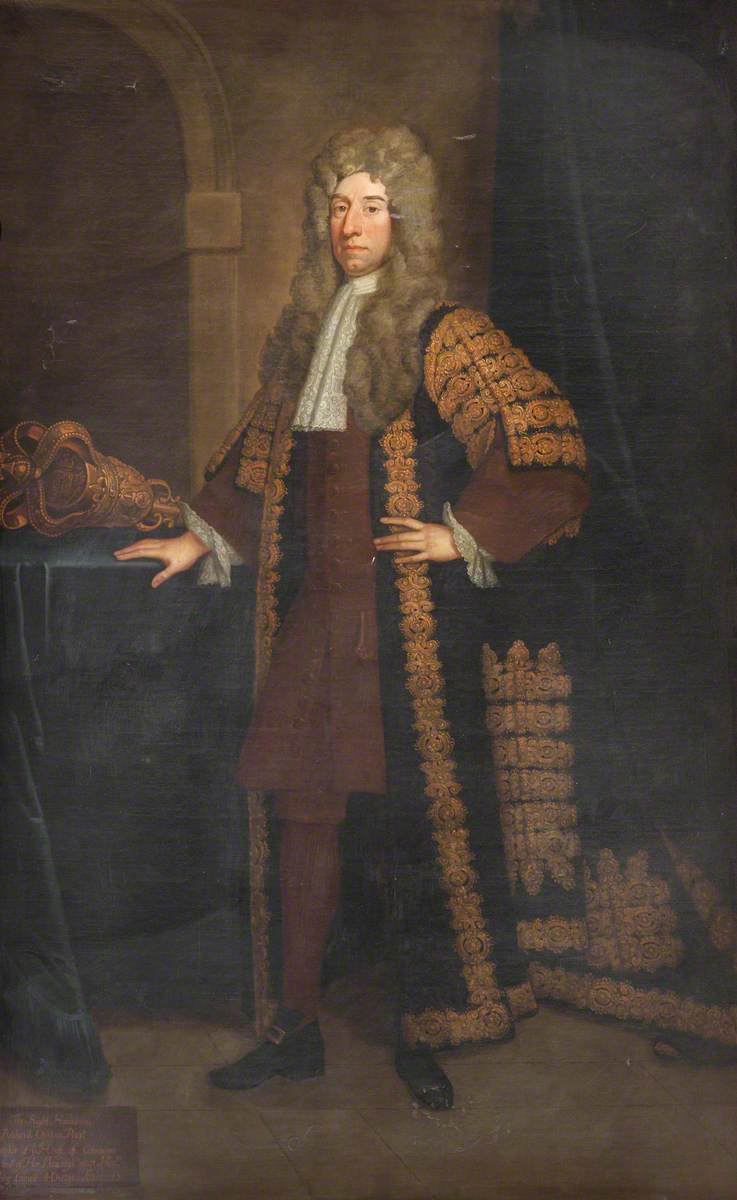
Richard Onslow, 1st Baron Onslow

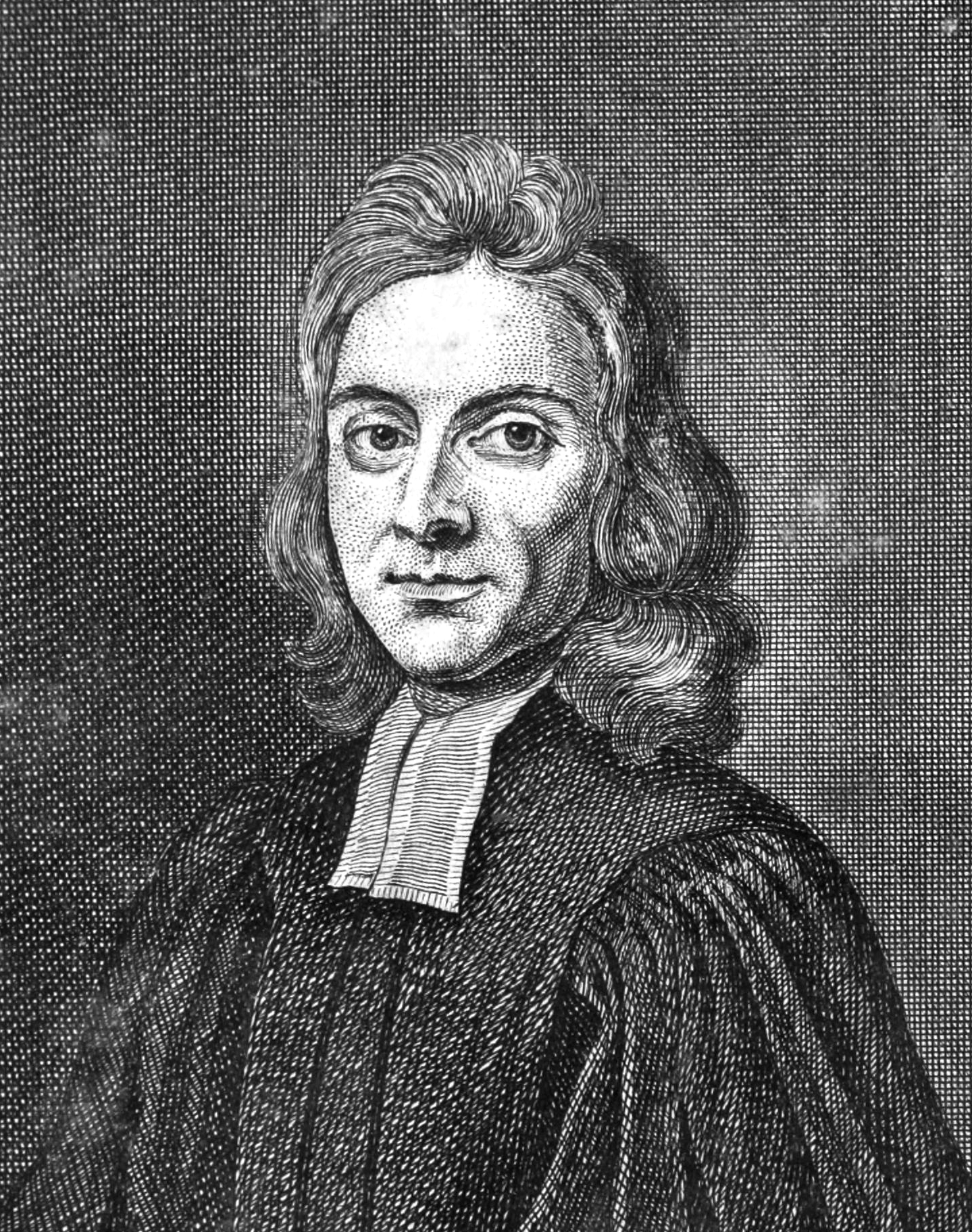
John Kettlewell

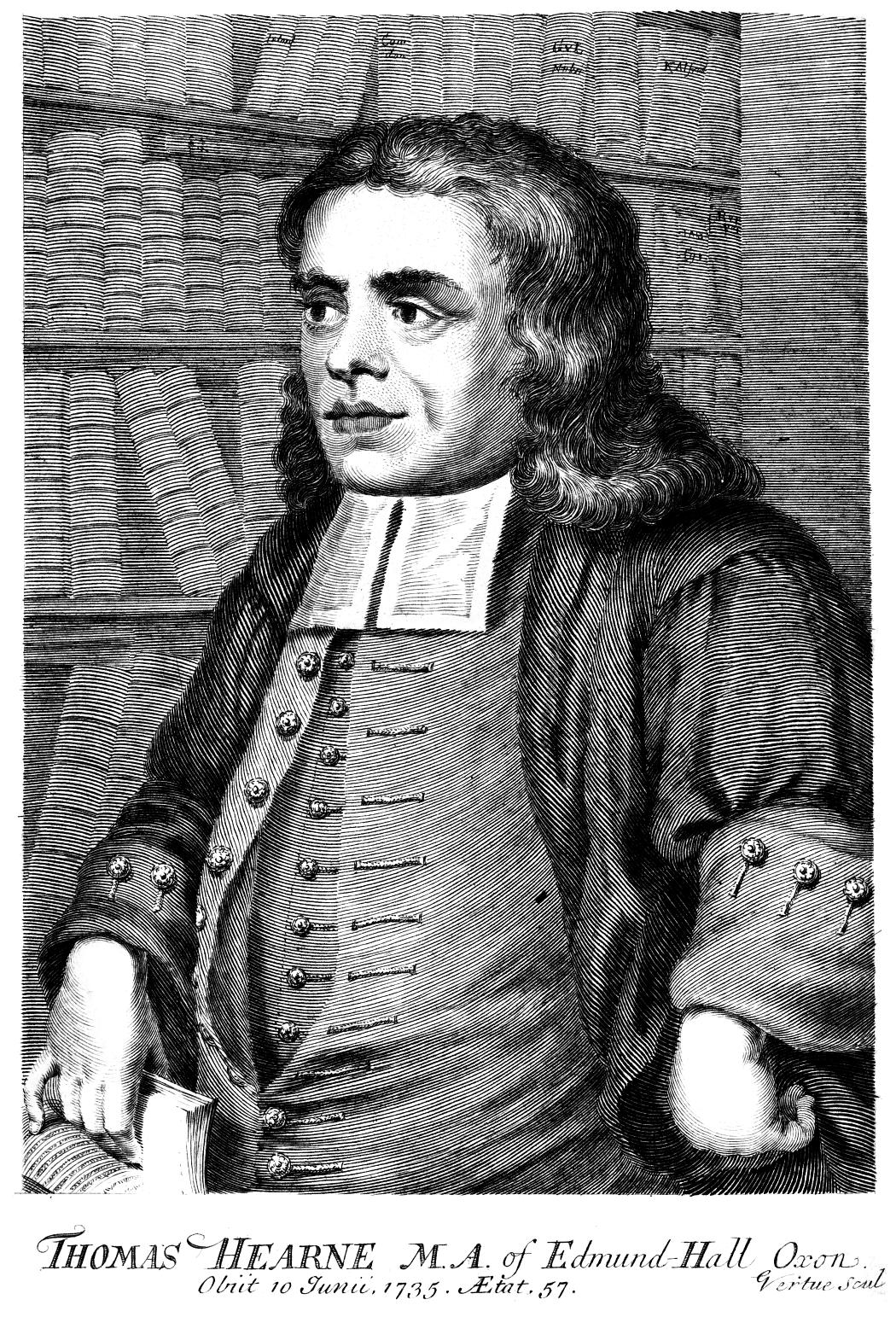
Thomas Hearne

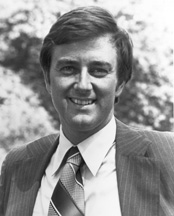
Larry Pressler

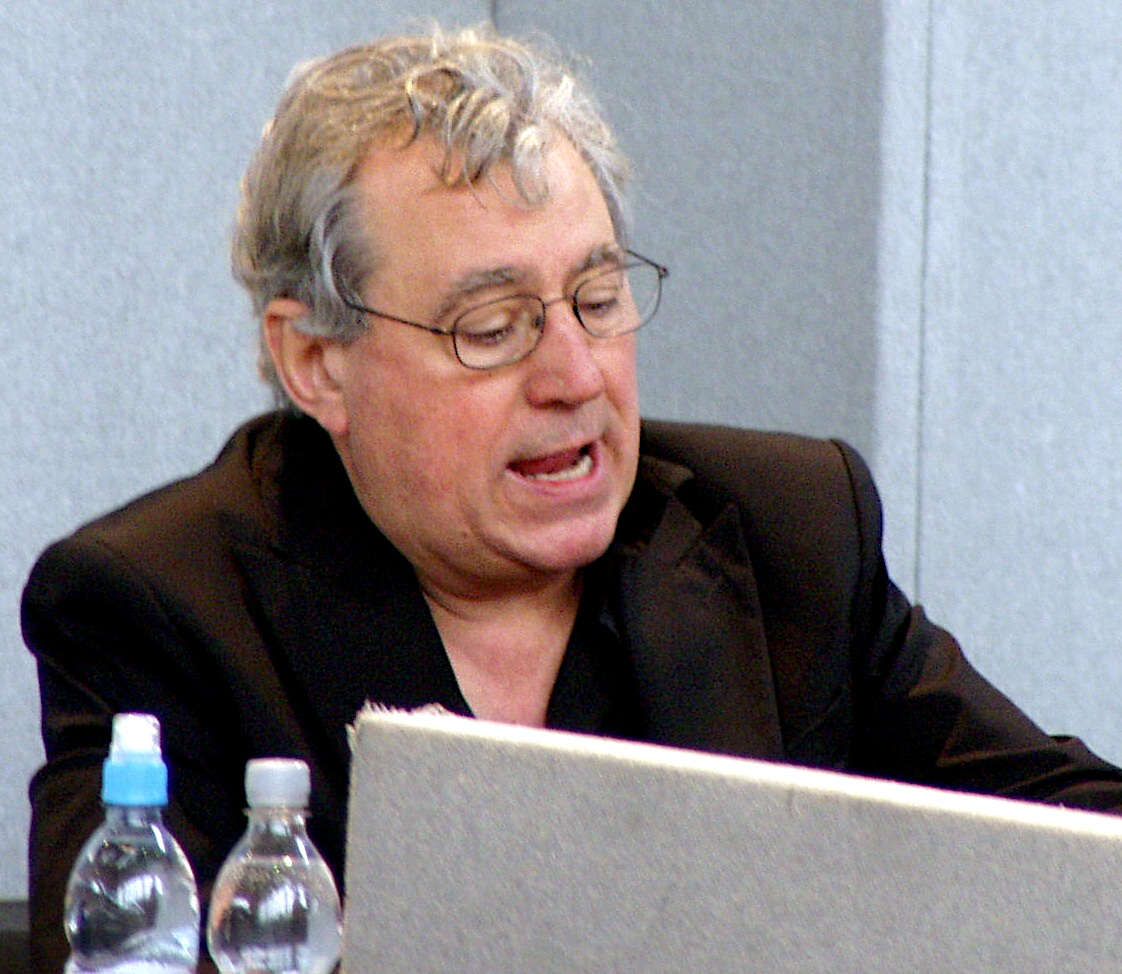
Terry Jones

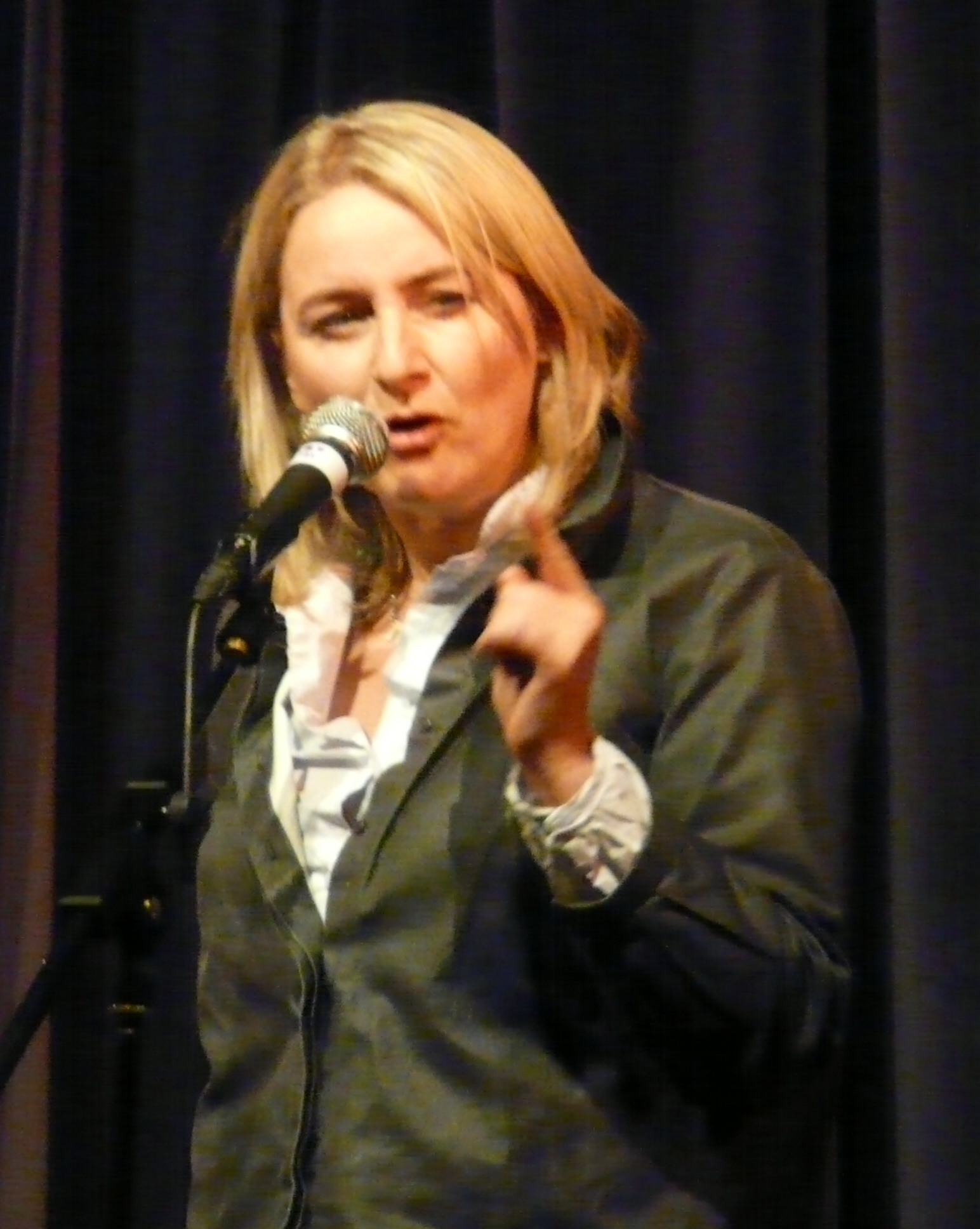
Emma Kennedy

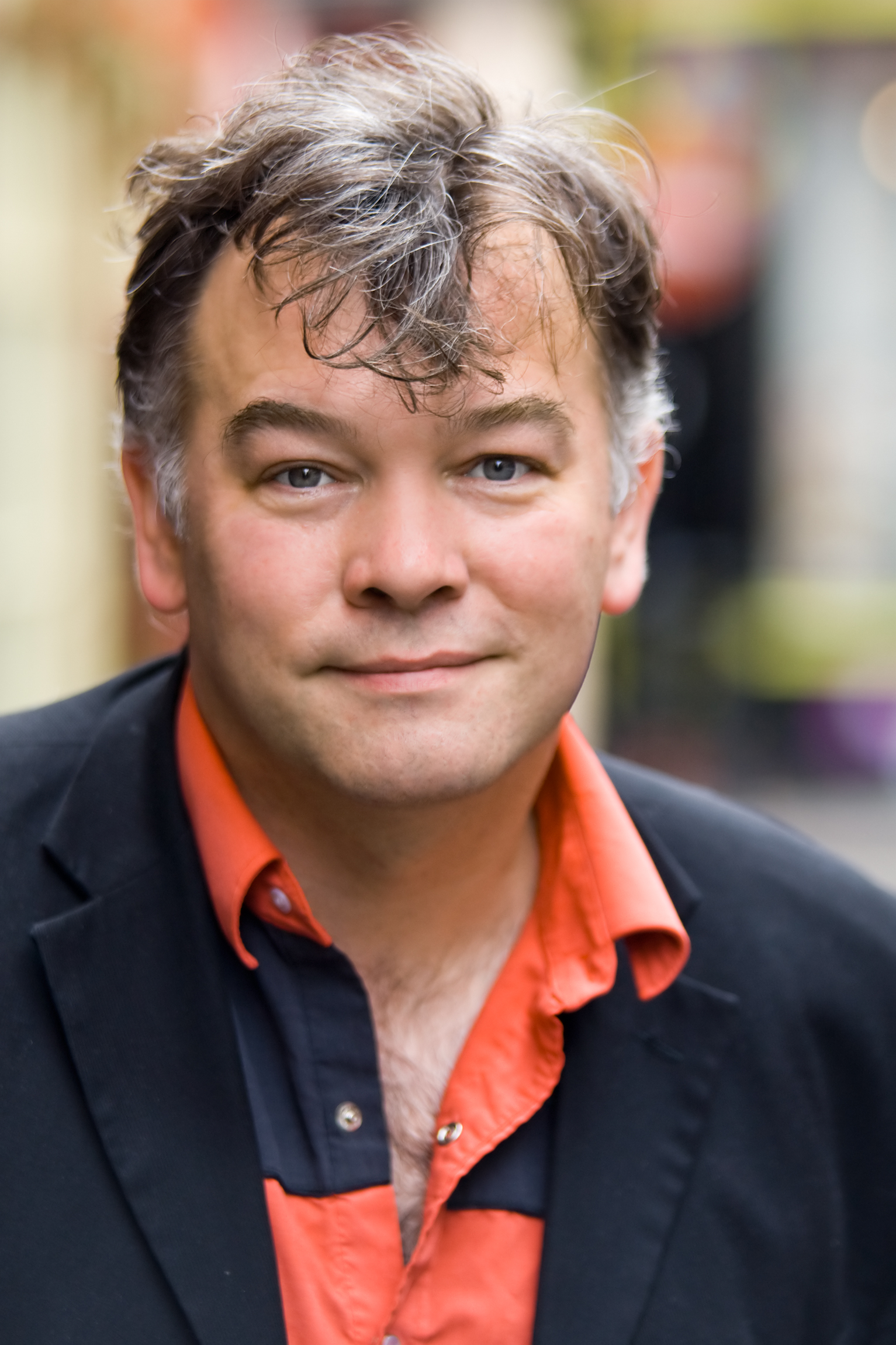
Stewart Lee

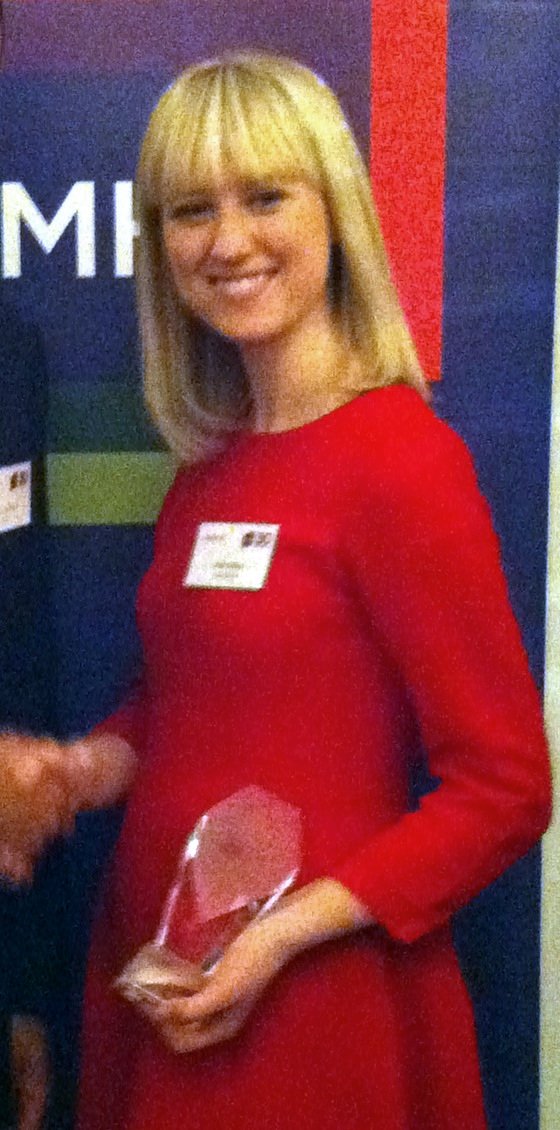
Sophy Ridge

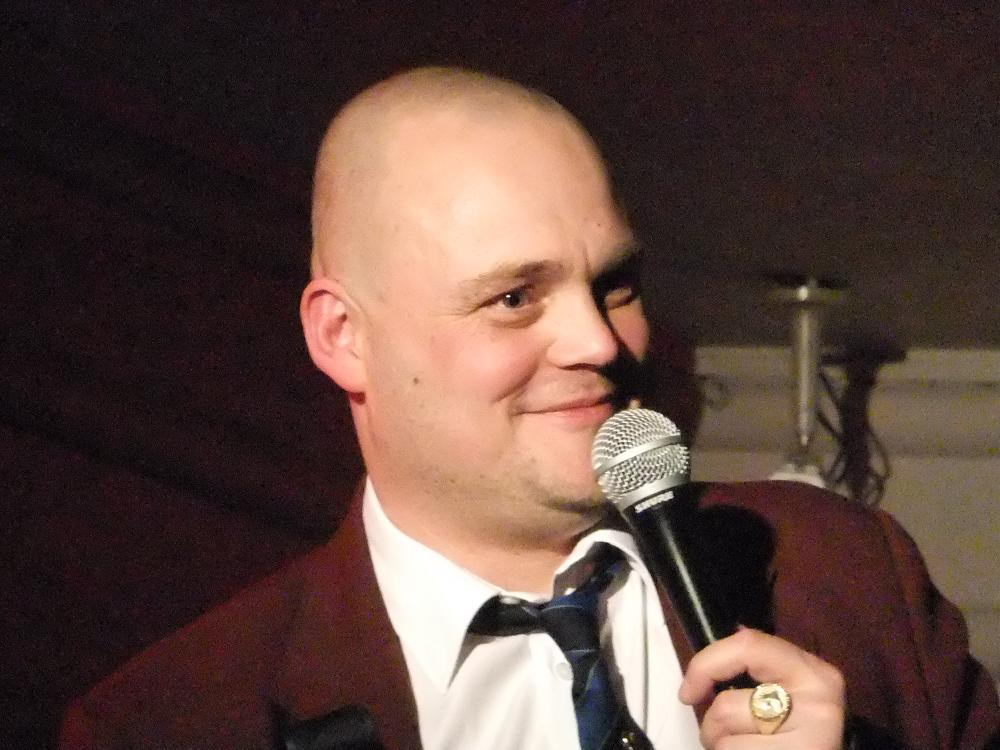
Al Murray

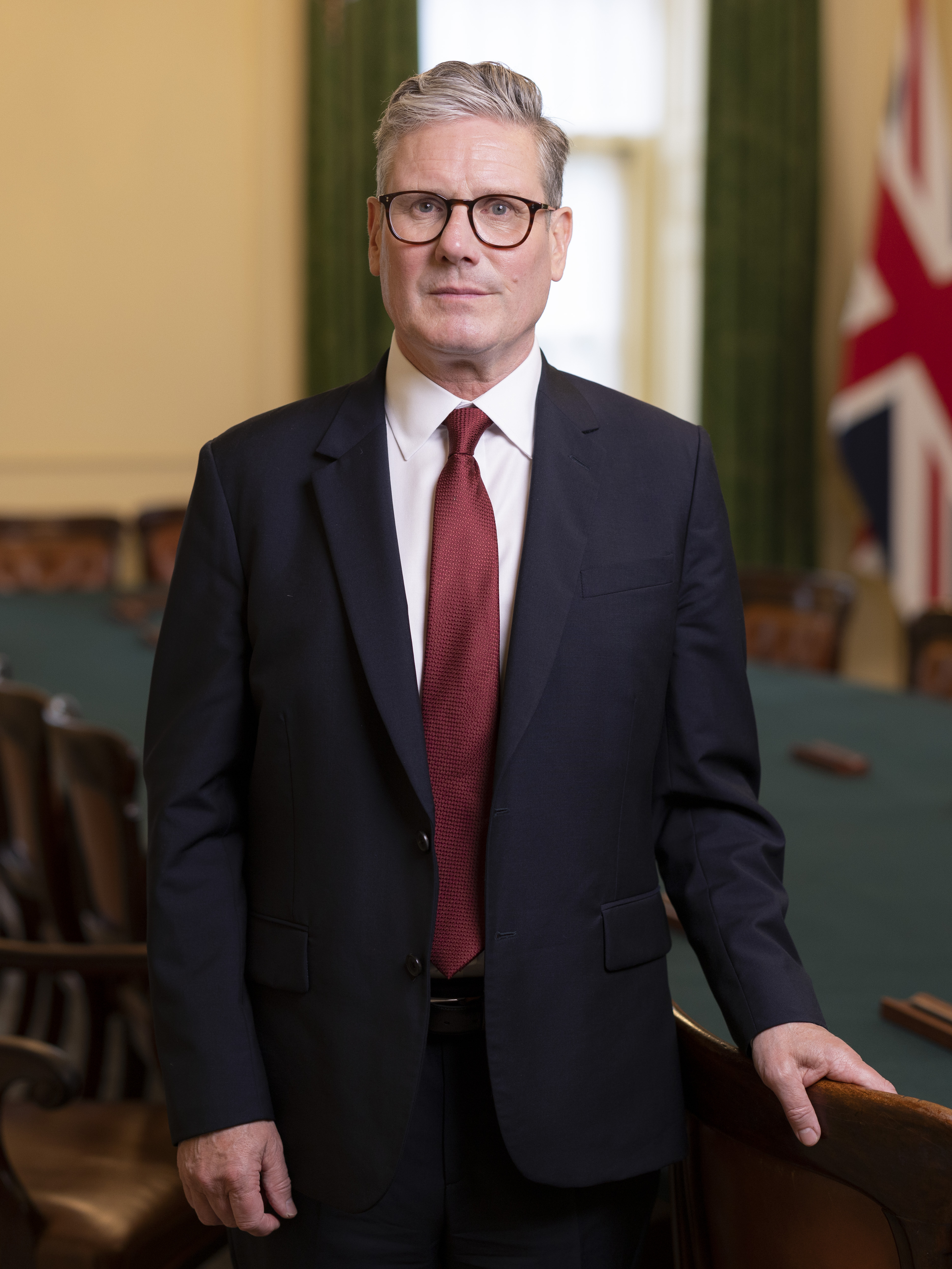
Keir Starmer

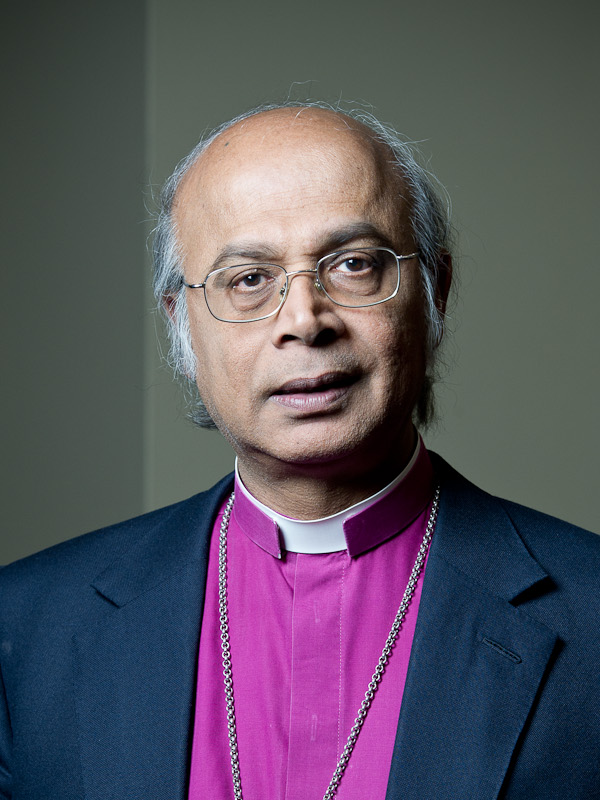
Michael Nazir-Ali

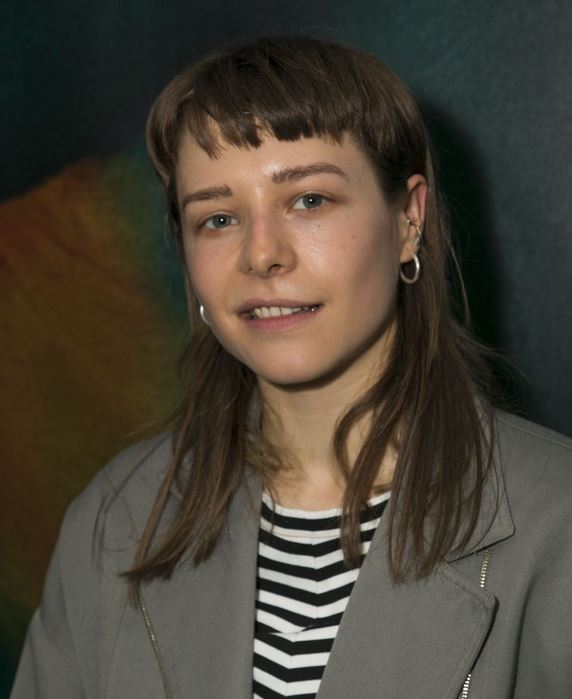
Emma D'Arcy

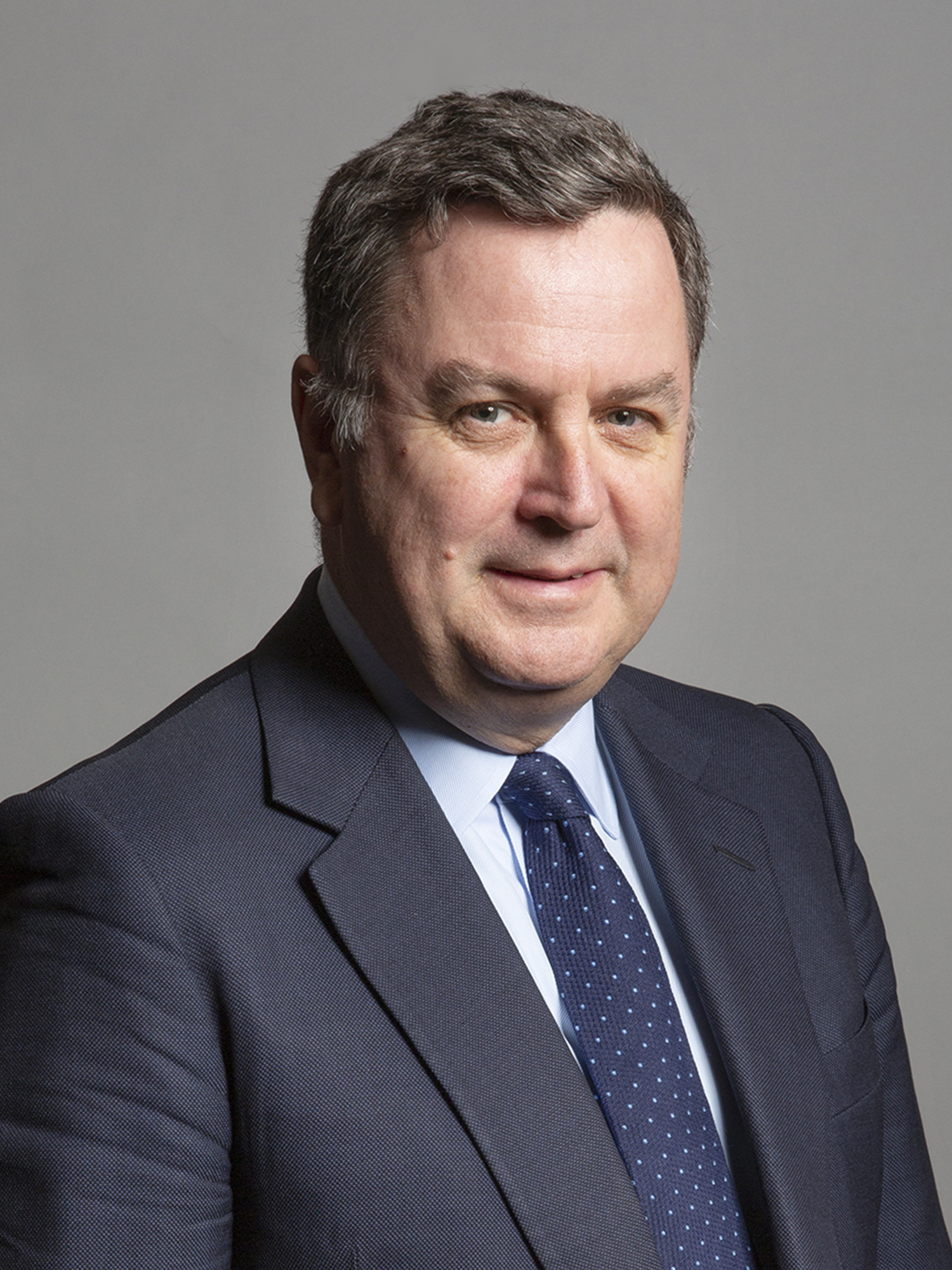
Mel Stride

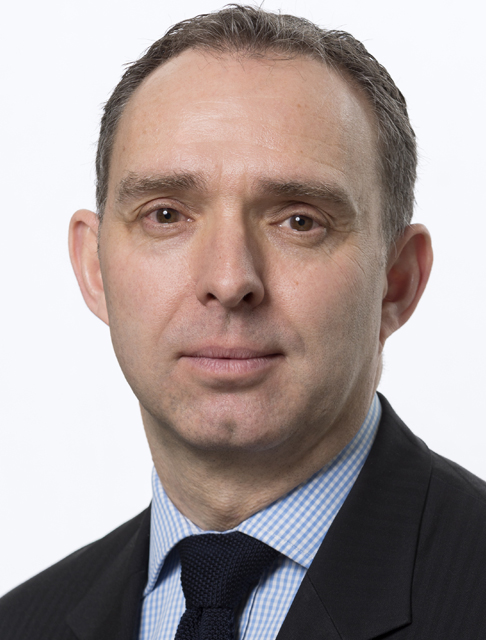
Mark Sedwill

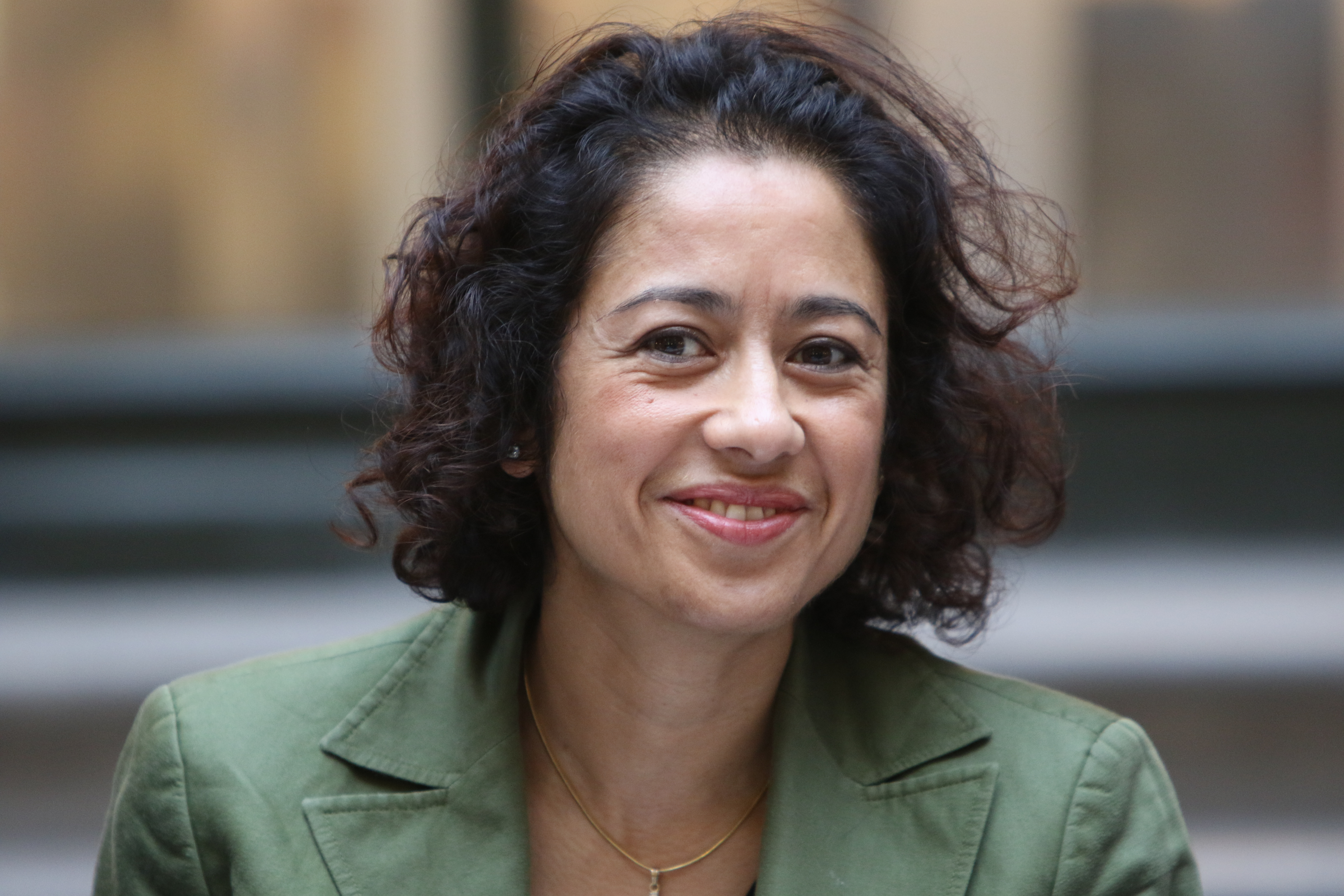
Samira Ahmed

Notable alumni of St Edmund Hall include former British prime minister Keir Starmer, diplomats Robert Macaire and Mark Sedwill, politicians Richard Onslow, 1st Baron Onslow and Mel Stride, former Bishop of Rochester Michael Nazir-Ali, as well as journalists Samira Ahmed (1986, English) and Anna Botting (1986, Geography).

=== Other notable figures ===
- Edmund of Abingdon
- Jeremy Paxman, a Fellow of the College by Special Election.

=== Principals ===
- 1405–1406 William Taylor, theologian, priest, excommunicated and executed as a Lollard
- 1410–1414 Peter Payne, theologian, diplomat, Lollard and Taborite
- 1518-1529 John Pyttys or Pettys, clerk, Master of Arts
- 1565– Thomas Lancaster, Protestant clergyman, Church of Ireland Archbishop of Armagh
- 1609-1610 John Waldron
- 1610–1631 John Rawlinson, clergyman
- 1658–1676 Thomas Tully
- 1685–1707 John Mill, theologian
- 1751–1760 George Fothergill
- 1722–1740 Henry Felton, clergyman and academic
- 1740–1751 Thomas Shaw
- 1824–1843 Anthony Grayson
- 1864–1903 Edward Moore
- 1913–1920 Henry Williams, Bishop of Carlisle (1920–1946)
- 1914–1918 Leonard Hodgson (Vice-Principal)
- 1920–1928 G.B. Allen
- 1928 George B. Cronshaw
- 1929–1951 Alfred Brotherston Emden
- 1951–1979 J. N. D. Kelly, clergyman
- 1979–1982 Sir Ieuan Maddock
- 1982–1996 J C B Gosling
- 1996–1998 Sir Stephen Tumim
- 1999–2009 Michael Mingos, Professor of Inorganic Chemistry
- 2009–2018 Keith Gull, FRS
- 2018–present Baroness Willis of Summertown

=== Fellows ===
Honorary Fellows include the structural engineer Faith Wainwright (1980, Engineering) and the lawyer Elizabeth Hollingworth (1984, BCL).

== Gallery ==
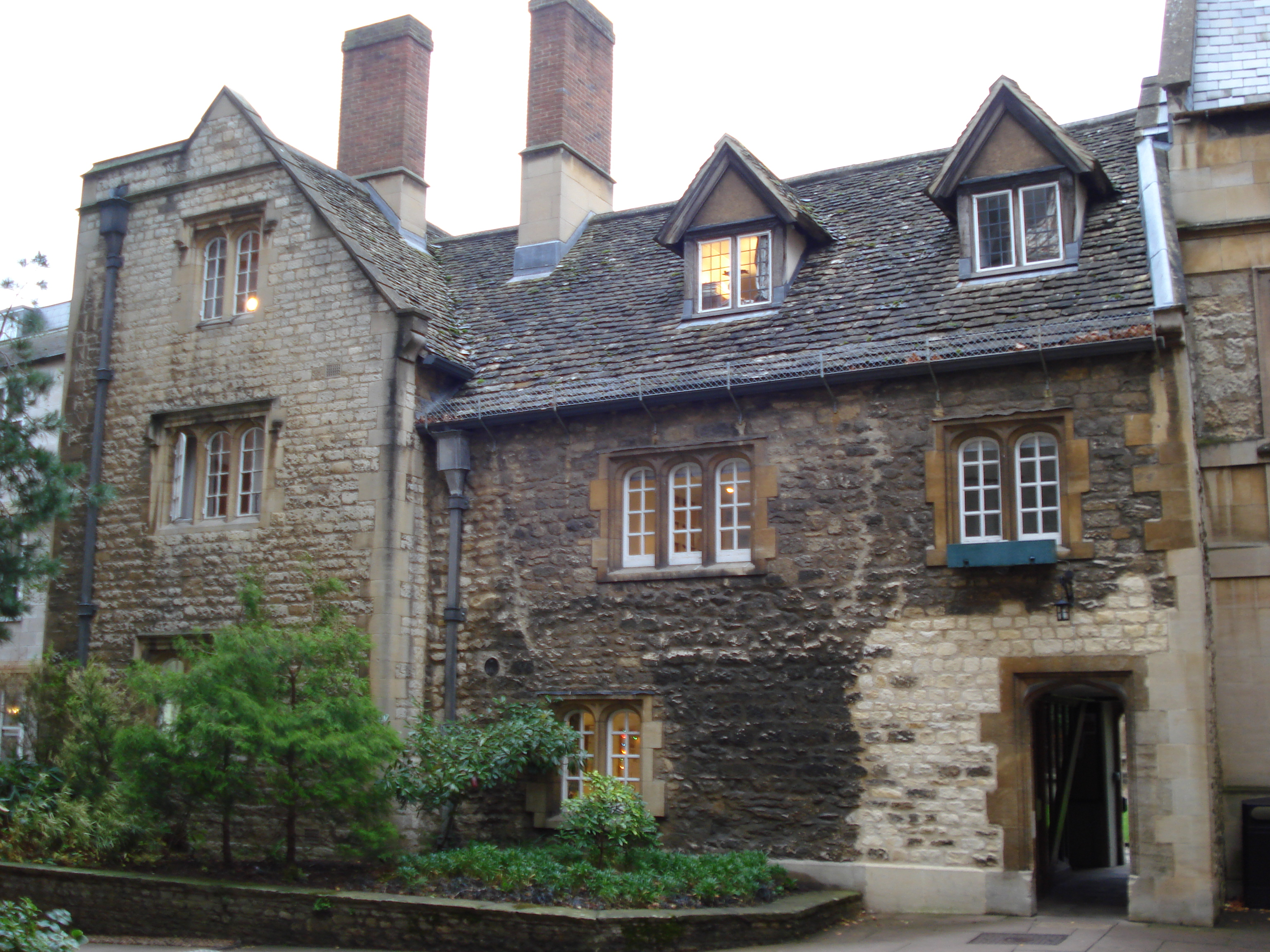
Rear of the buildings on the east side of the Front Quad as seen from the Wolfson Dining Hall

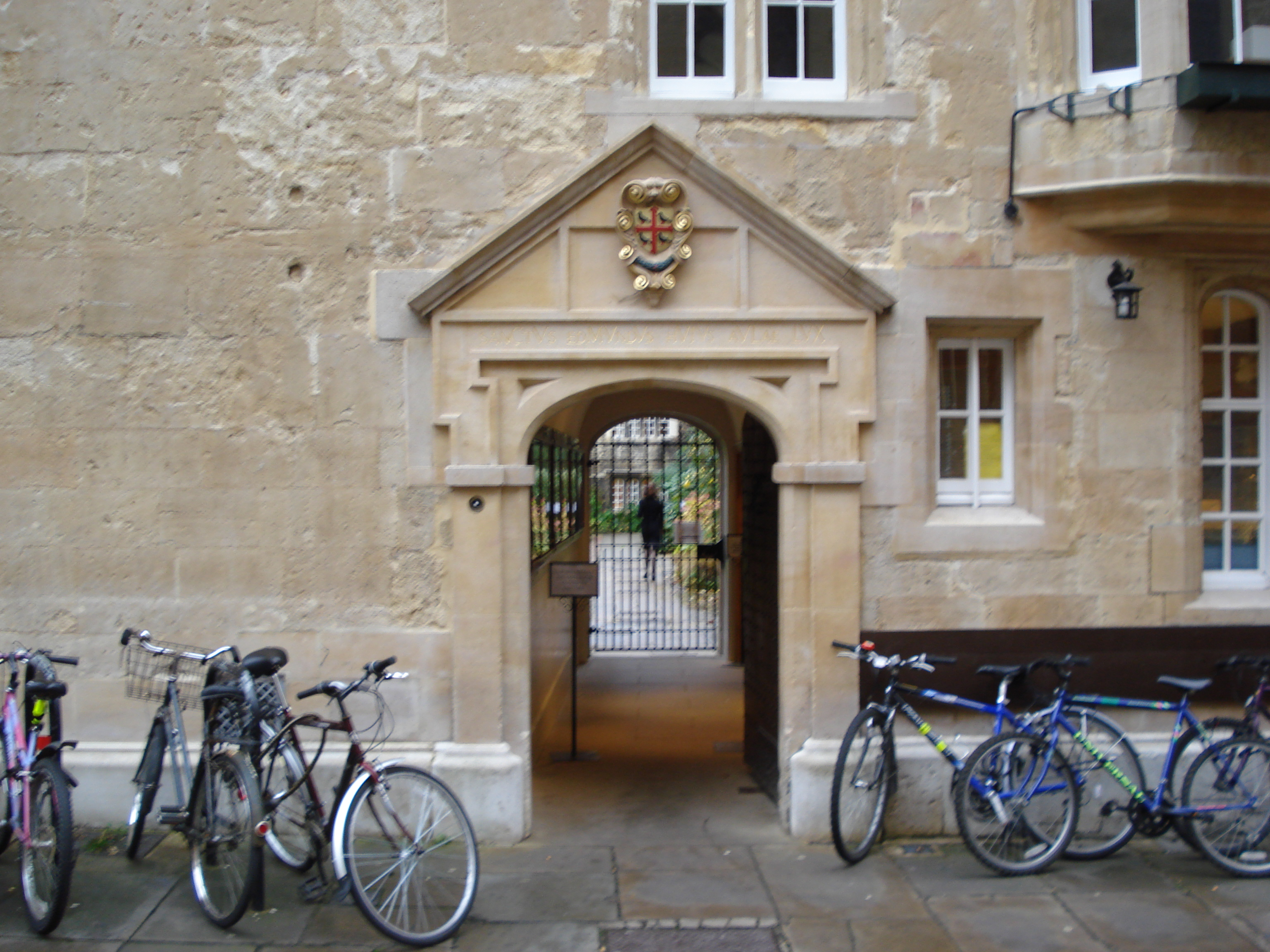
Front gate

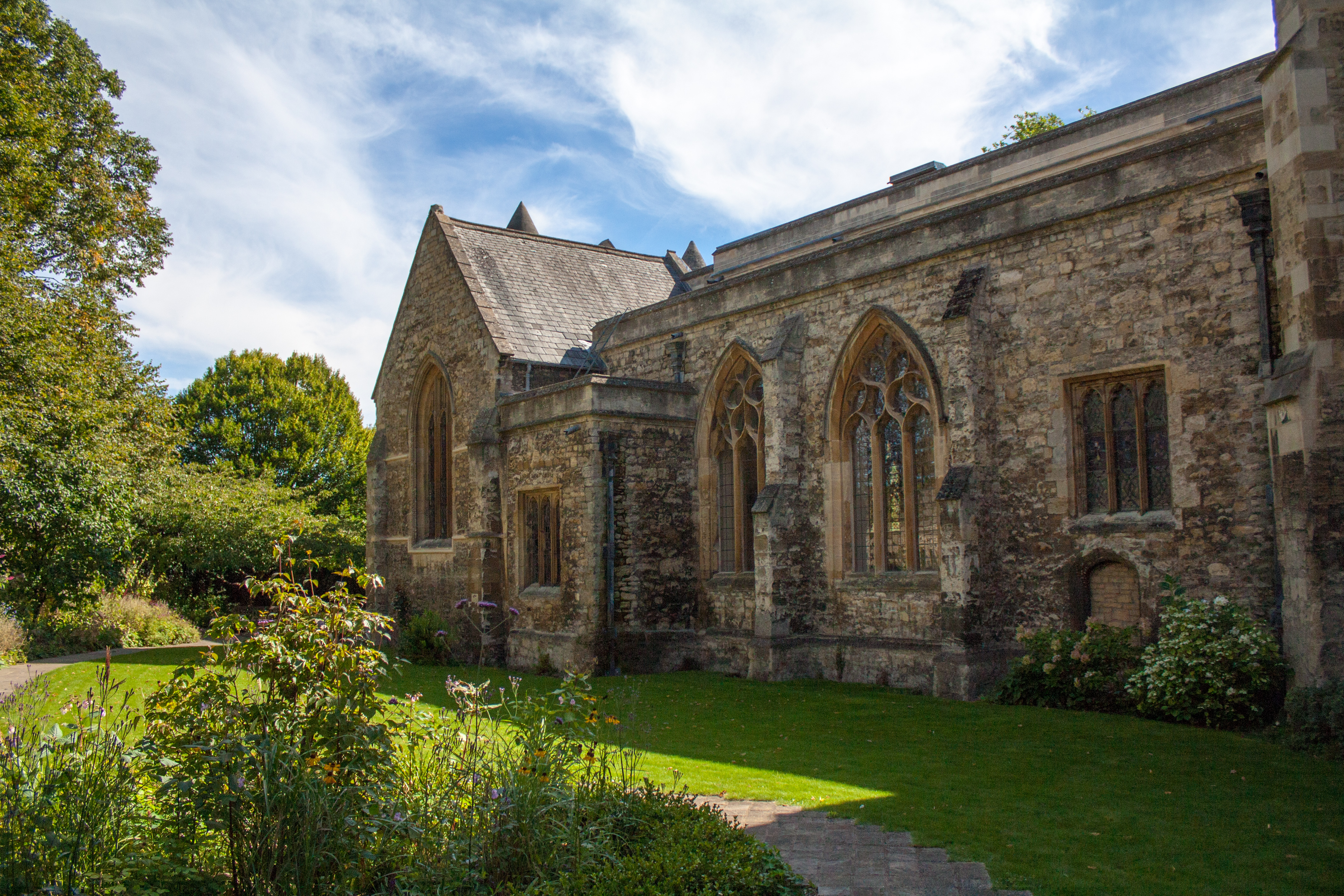
College library

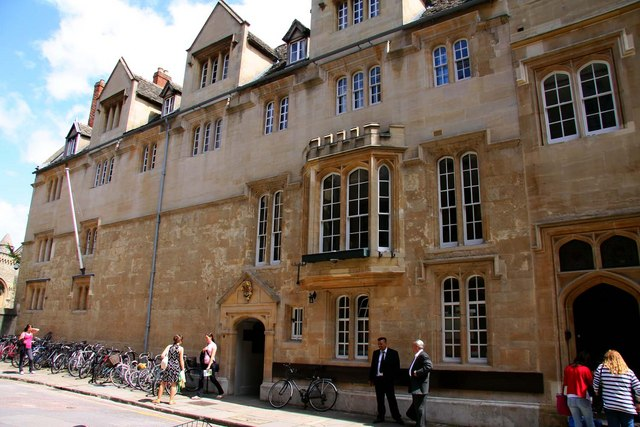
St Edmund Hall in Queens Lane

== Sources ==
- Hibbart, Christopher (1988). The Encyclopædia of Oxford. London: MacMillan London Limited. pp. 388–391. ISBN 033339917X. Archived from the original on 22 July 2007.
- Emden, Alfred B. (1927). An Oxford Hall in Medieval Times: Being the Early History of St Edmund Hall. Oxford: Clarendon Press.
- Kelly, J. N. D (1989). St Edmund Hall: Almost Seven Hundred Years. Oxford: Oxford University Press. pp. 1–4. ISBN 0-19-951559-X.
- Salter, H. E.; Lobel, Mary, eds. (1994). A History of the County of Oxford: Volume 3: The University of Oxford. Victoria County History. Folkestone: Dawson for the University of London Institute of Historical Research. pp. 319–335. ISBN 0-7129-1064-6.
- Brockliss, L. W. B. (2016). The University of Oxford: A History. Oxford: Oxford University Press. pp. 265–371. ISBN 978-0-19-924356-3.
