= Musken =

Village in Hamarøy Municipality, Norway

Musken Musken (Norwegian) Måsske (Lule Sami)
- Village
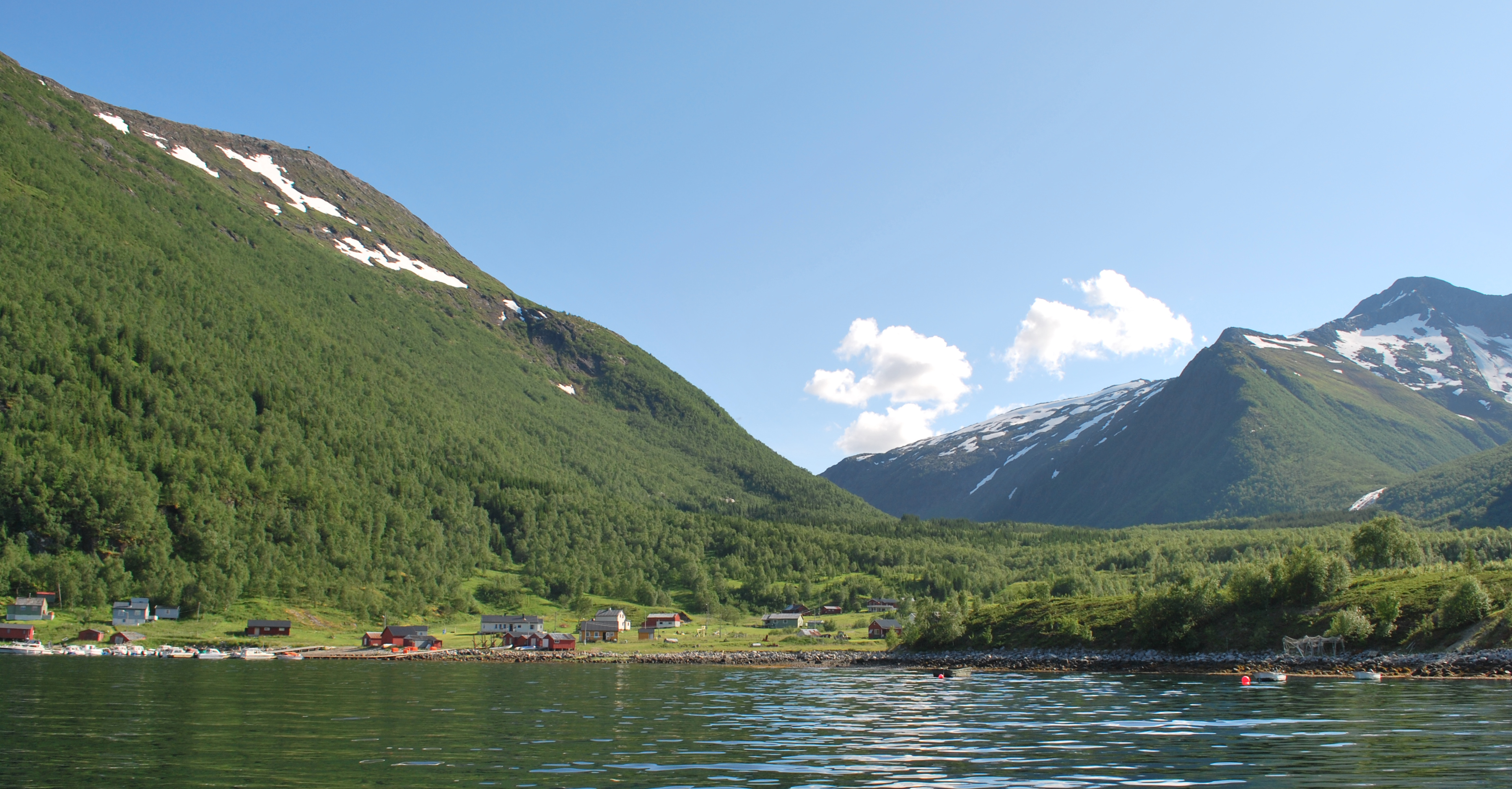
- View of the village
- Interactive map of Musken
- Location within Nordland Location within Norway
- Coordinates: 67.8881°N 16.2243°E
- Country: Norway
- Region: Northern Norway
- County: Nordland
- District: Salten
- Municipality: Hamarøy Municipality
- Elevation: 163 m (535 ft)
- Time zone: UTC+01:00 (CET)
  - Summer (DST): UTC+02:00 (CEST)
- Post Code: 8274 Musken

Musken (Norwegian) or Måsske (Lule Sami) is a village in Hamarøy Municipality in Nordland county, Norway. It lies halfway along the long and small Hellmofjorden, an arm of the Tysfjorden. The village is not far from Hellemobotn, where mainland Norway is at its narrowest, just 6 kilometres (3.7 mi) wide from the ocean shore to Sweden.

In 2016, Musken and the surrounding area has 33 full-year residents, although the population increases significantly in the summertime. The local school is now closed, but Musken school was one of two schools in the world that taught in the Lule Sami language (the other school in nearby Drag is still in operation).

Musken has Norway's only manual mail sorting centre. One of Northern Europe's deepest caves, Raggejavreraige, is located just south of Musken. The cave is 580 metres (1,900 ft) deep.
