= Alfred Brotherston Emden =

British academic

Alfred Brotherston Emden (1888–1979) was an Oxford University historian and Principal of St Edmund Hall from 1929 to 1951. He published widely on matters concerning St Edmund Hall and the medieval church. His generous gifts, and lifelong association with the Hall are honoured with his name being conferred on several buildings and rooms within the college.

== Early life ==
Emden, the eldest son of Alfred Charles Emden - a barrister and county-court judge - was born on 22 October 1888 in West Ealing, Middlesex. He held a scholarship at The King's School, Canterbury (1903–1907) and Lincoln College, Oxford University from where he graduated in 1911 with a second class degree in modern history.

After his graduation, he qualified for the bar at the Inner Temple but instead of practicing law, ran a home for disadvantaged boys in Sydenham from 1913 to 1915 and thereafter became schoolmaster at Strand School, Brixton. Shortly after taking up his last post, he enlisted in the Royal Naval Volunteer Reserve and served as an Able Seaman on the destroyer HMS Parker. In 1919, while still enlisted, he accepted a tutorship in Modern history at St Edmund Hall, Oxford.

== St Edmund Hall ==
After arriving at the Hall in 1919, Emden was appointed Bursar and in 1920, Vice Principal. He was to remain with the Hall for another thirty years. He developed an intense interest in the history of St Edmund Hall on which he produced an article in the St Edmund Hall Magazine which he founded in 1920. In 1927 he published An Oxford Hall in Medieval Times - a standard history of the college that was republished in 1968 and remained in print until 1972.

In 1929, he was appointed principal on the retirement of Dr G.B. Allan and shortly thereafter the death of Allan's chosen successor. Emden oversaw the restoration of the old buildings of the Hall and the completion of the quad in 1934 with buildings on its southside. A reorganisation of the Hall's constitution in 1937 saw the acquisition of its freehold from Queen's College which had held it since 1557. Emden tutored in medieval history until 1939.

During the Second World War, Emden was placed in charge of the Oxford University Naval Division as a Lieutenant-commander having persuaded the Admiralty to raise such divisions in several British universities. During his war service, he accompanied a submarine patrol in the Bay of Biscay.

== Retirement ==
After World War II, Emden's health started to fail and he resigned his Principalship at the age of 63 and was succeeded by his Vice-Principal Rev. J.N.D. Kelly. His retirement did not curtail his academic career, and from 1957 to 1959 he published A Biographical Register of the University of Oxford to A.D. 1500 with a similar work on Cambridge University in 1963. This was followed in 1967 by a Survey of Dominicans in England and in 1974 a supplement to A Biographical Register of the University of Oxford to A.D. 1501-1540.

A.B. Emden died on 8 June 1979 a bachelor at his home in Headington, Oxford - a home he shared with his mother until her death in 1955. He left the bulk of his £400,000 estate to St Edmund Hall and his ashes are interred in the college's ante-chapel.

== Selected bibliography ==
- Emden, A.B. [1927] (1968) An Oxford hall in medieval times : being the early history of St. Edmund Hall, Oxford : Clarendon Press, 322 p.
- Emden, A.B. (1932) An account of the chapel and library building, St. Edmund Hall, Oxford : written in the year of the two hundred and fiftieth anniversary of the consecration of the chapel, Oxford : Printed by John Johnson at the University Press, 73 p.
- Emden, A.B. (1957) A biographical register of the University of Oxford to A.D. 1500: vol. 1. A.-E., Oxford : Clarendon Press, ISBN 0-19-951562-X
- Emden, A.B. (1958) A biographical register of the University of Oxford to A.D. 1500: vol. 2. F.-O., Oxford : Clarendon Press, ISBN 0-19-951563-8
- Emden, A.B. (1959) A biographical register of the University of Oxford to A.D. 1500: vol. 3. P.-Z., Oxford : Clarendon Press, ISBN 0-19-951564-6
- Emden, A.B. (1963) A biographical register of the University of Cambridge to 1500, Cambridge University Press, 695 p
- Emden, A.B. (1967) A survey of Dominicans in England based on the ordination lists in episcopal registers (1268 to 1538), Institutum historicum ff. praedicatorum Romae ad S. Sabinae. Dissertationes historicae, 18, Rome : S. Sabina, 497 p.
- Emden, A.B. (1974) A biographical register of the University of Oxford, A.D.1501-1540, Oxford : Clarendon Press, ISBN 0-19-951008-3
- Emden, A.B. (1977) Medieval decorated tiles in Dorset, London : Phillimore, ISBN 0-85033-191-9
