= Fjerdvatnet =

Lake in Nordland, Norway

Skilgájávrre (Lule Sami); Fjerdvatnet (Norwegian); Kråkmovatnet (Norwegian)
- Historic: Skilggajávri (Lule Sami)
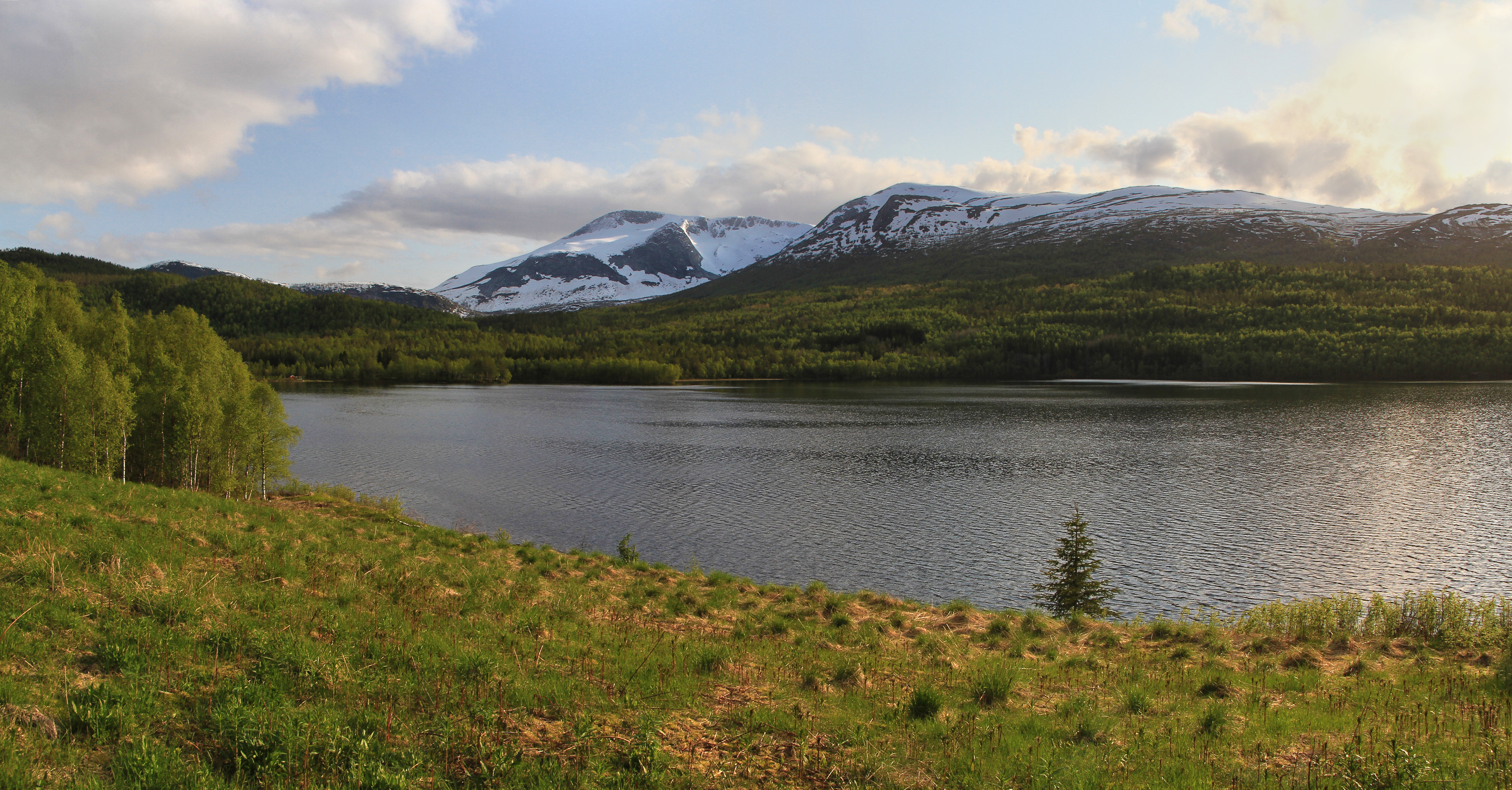
- A hillside view overlooking Kråkmovatnet Lake, Norway (June 2011).
- Interactive map of the lake
- Location: Hamarøy Municipality, Nordland
- Coordinates: 67.8242°N 15.9779°E
- Basin countries: Norway
- Max. length: 3 kilometres (1.9 mi)
- Max. width: 1 kilometre (0.62 mi)
- Surface area: 2.24 km^{2} (0.86 sq mi)
- Shore length^{1}: 7.23 kilometres (4.49 mi)
- Surface elevation: 72 metres (236 ft)
- References: NVE
- ^{1} Shore length is not a well-defined measure.

Fjerdvatnet or Kråkmovatnet (Norwegian) or Skilgájávrre (Lule Sami) is a lake in Hamarøy Municipality in Nordland county, Norway. The European route E6 highway runs along the eastern shore of the lake. The lake lies about 12 kilometres (7.5 mi) southeast of the village of Tømmerneset. The large lake Rekvatnet lies just to the east and the lake Sandnesvatnet lies just to the north of this lake.

== See also ==
- List of lakes in Norway
