= Sandnesvatnet =

Lake in Nordland, Norway

Sandnesvatnet (Norwegian) Sáttonjárgjávrre (Lule Sami)
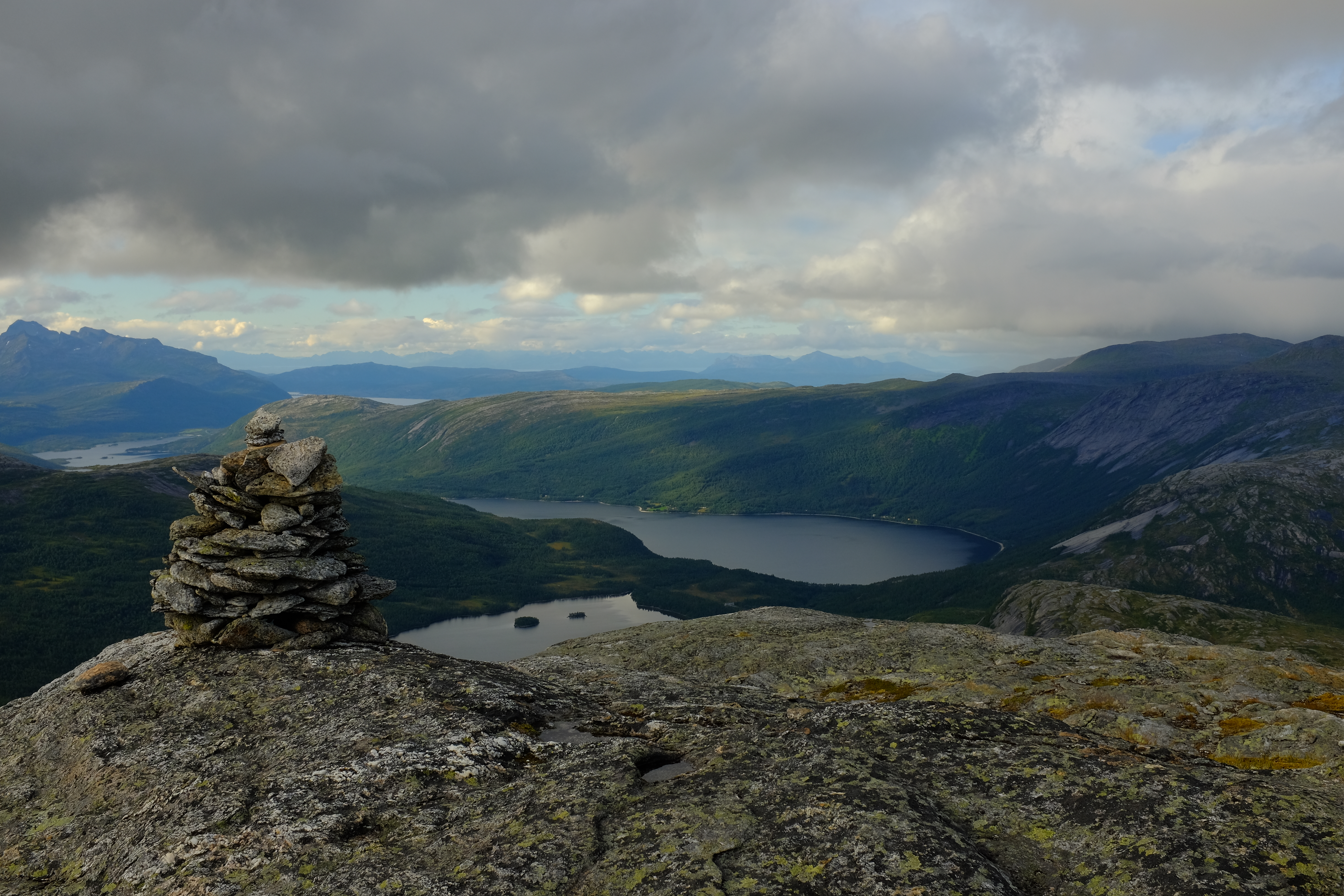
- Sandnesvatnet lake in Hamarøy municipality in Nordland
- Interactive map of the lake
- Location: Hamarøy Municipality, Nordland
- Coordinates: 67.8552°N 15.9734°E
- Basin countries: Norway
- Max. length: 4.5 kilometres (2.8 mi)
- Max. width: 2 kilometres (1.2 mi)
- Surface area: 5.16 km^{2} (1.99 sq mi)
- Shore length^{1}: 12.77 kilometres (7.93 mi)
- Surface elevation: 45 metres (148 ft)
- References: NVE
- ^{1} Shore length is not a well-defined measure.

Sandnesvatnet (Norwegian) or Sáttonjárgjávrre (Lule Sami) is a lake in Hamarøy Municipality in Nordland county, Norway. The European route E6 highway runs along the eastern and northern shores of the lake. The lake lies about 5 kilometres (3.1 mi) southeast of the village of Tømmerneset. The lake Strindvatnet lies just to the northwest and the lake Fjerdvatnet lies to the south of the lake.

== See also ==
- List of lakes in Norway
