= Strindvatnet =

Lake in Nordland, Norway

Strindvatnet (Norwegian) Tjoalmejávrre (Lule Sami)
- Historic: Čoalmejávri (Lule Sami)
- Interactive map of the lake
- Location: Hamarøy Municipality, Nordland
- Coordinates: 67.8656°N 15.9061°E
- Basin countries: Norway
- Max. length: 1.7 kilometres (1.1 mi)
- Max. width: 1.7 kilometres (1.1 mi)
- Surface area: 2.15 km^{2} (0.83 sq mi)
- Shore length^{1}: 6.34 kilometres (3.94 mi)
- Surface elevation: 45 metres (148 ft)
- References: NVE
- ^{1} Shore length is not a well-defined measure.

Strindvatnet (Norwegian) or Tjoalmejávrre (Lule Sami) is a lake in Hamarøy Municipality in Nordland county, Norway. The lake lies about 5 kilometres (3.1 mi) south of the village of Tømmerneset. The European route E06 highway runs along the eastern shore of the lake. The lake Sandnesvatnet lies to the southeast and the lake Rotvatnet lies to the north of Strindvatnet.

== See also ==
- List of lakes in Norway
