= Borge Municipality (Nordland) =

Former municipality in Nordland, Norway

Borge Municipality Borge herred
- Former municipality
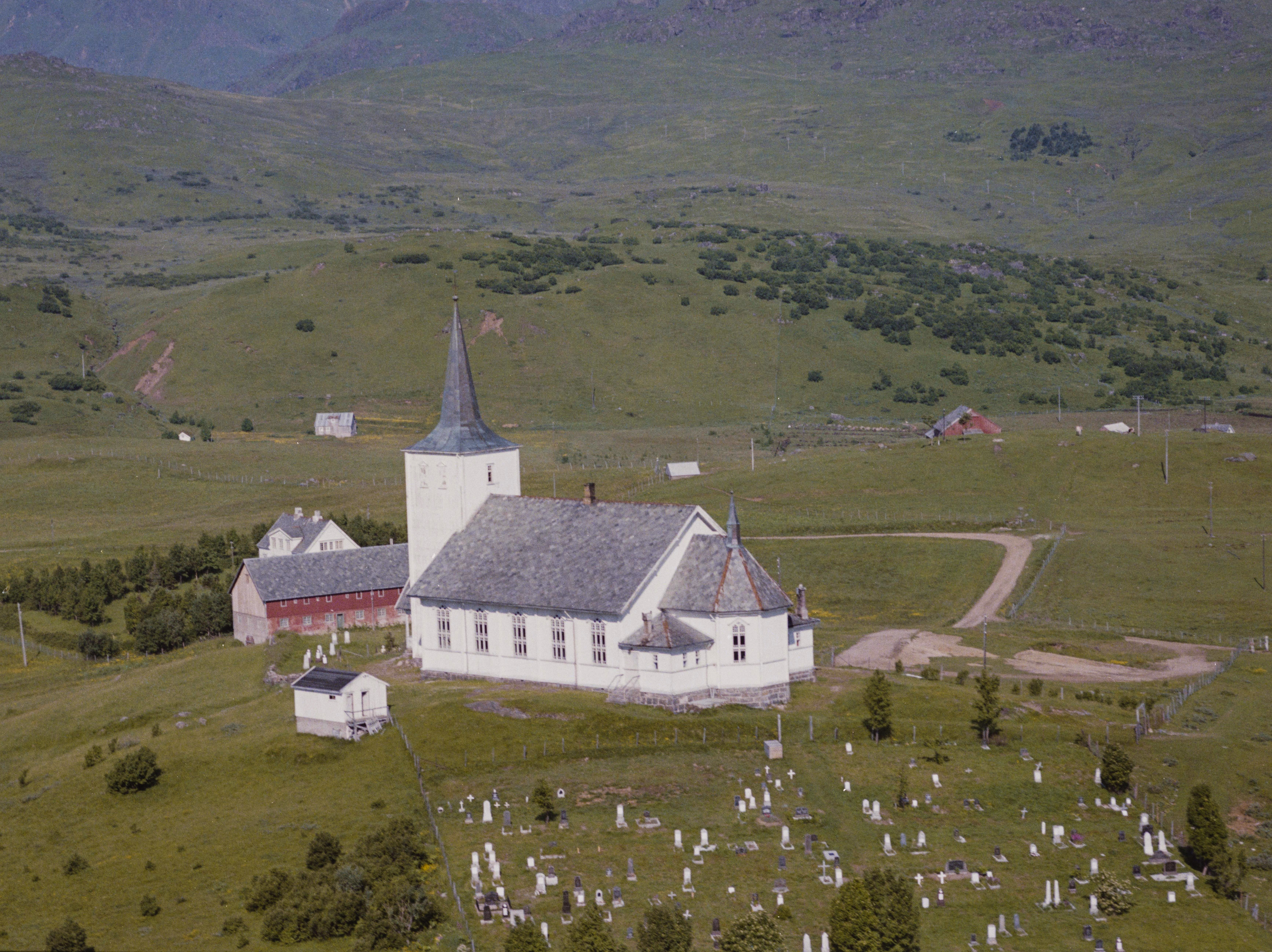
- View of the old Borge Church (burned down in 1983)

- Nordland within Norway

- Borge within Nordland
- Coordinates: 68°14′41″N 13°46′14″E
- Country: Norway
- County: Nordland
- District: Lofoten
- Established: 1 Jan 1838
  - Created as: Formannskapsdistrikt
- Disestablished: 1 Jan 1963
  - Succeeded by: Vestvågøy Municipality
- Administrative centre: Bøstad

Government
  - Mayor (1951-1962): Birger Val (H)

Area (upon dissolution)
  - Total: 193.4 km^{2} (74.7 sq mi)
  - Rank: #379 in Norway
- Highest elevation: 955.91 m (3,136.2 ft)

Population (1962)
  - Total: 4,082
  - Rank: #208 in Norway
  - Density: 21.1/km^{2} (55/sq mi)
  - Change (10 years): ▼ −10.4%
- Demonym(s): Borgefjerding; Borgfjerding

Official language
  - Norwegian form: Neutral
- Time zone: UTC+01:00 (CET)
  - Summer (DST): UTC+02:00 (CEST)
- ISO 3166 code: NO-1862

Borge is a former municipality in Nordland county, Norway. The 193-square-kilometre (75 sq mi) municipality existed from 1838 until 1963. It was located on the northern part of the island of Vestvågøya in what is now Vestvågøy Municipality. The administrative centre of the municipality was the village of Bøstad where Borge Church is located. Other villages in the municipality included Borg, Knutstad, and Tangstad.

Prior to its dissolution in 1963, the 193-square-kilometre (75 sq mi) municipality was the 379th largest by area out of the 705 municipalities in Norway. Borge Municipality was the 208th most populous municipality in Norway with a population of about 4,082. The municipality's population density was 21.1 inhabitants per square kilometre (55/sq mi) and its population had decreased by 10.4% over the previous 10-year period.

== General information ==
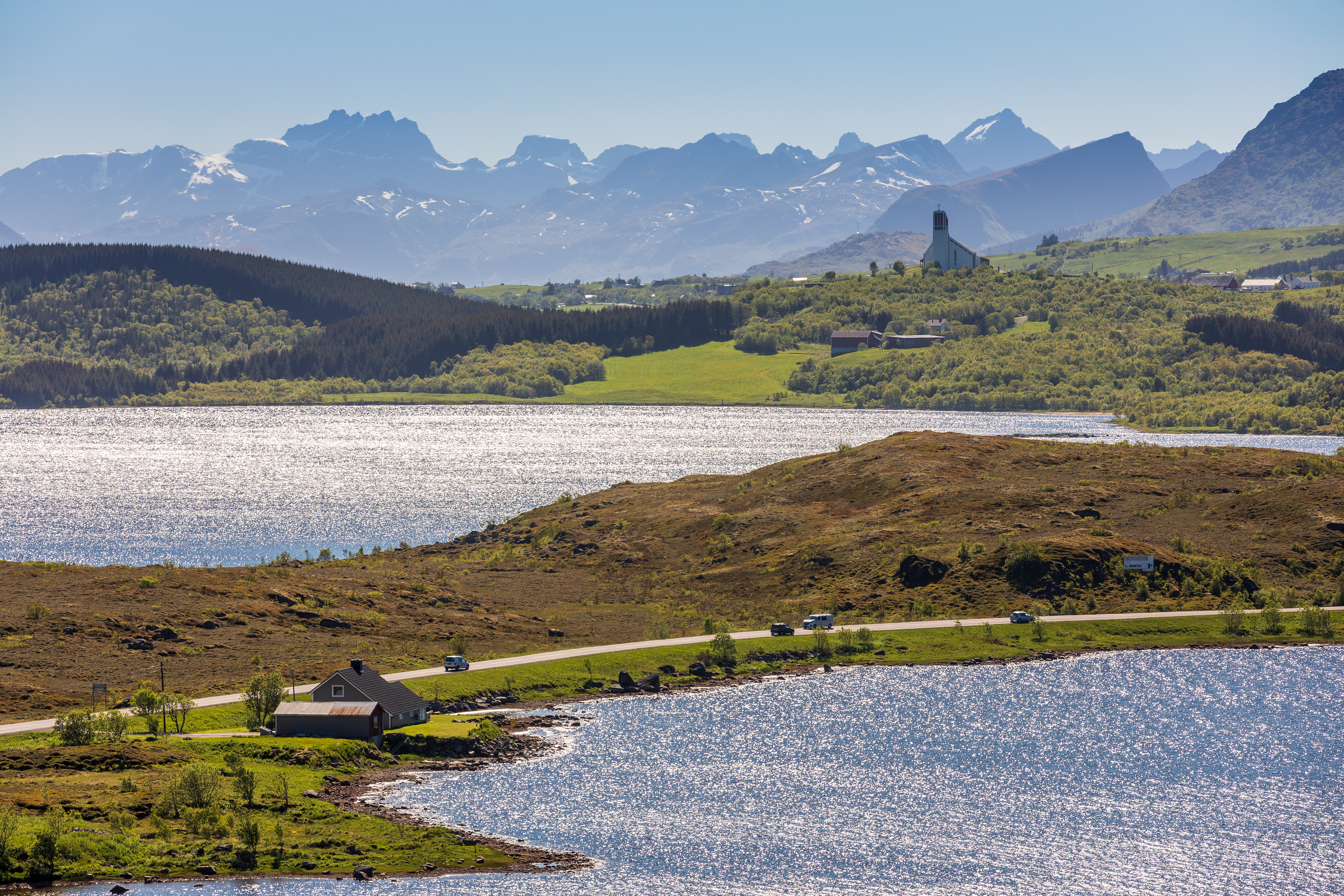
View towards Borge from Torvdalshalsen

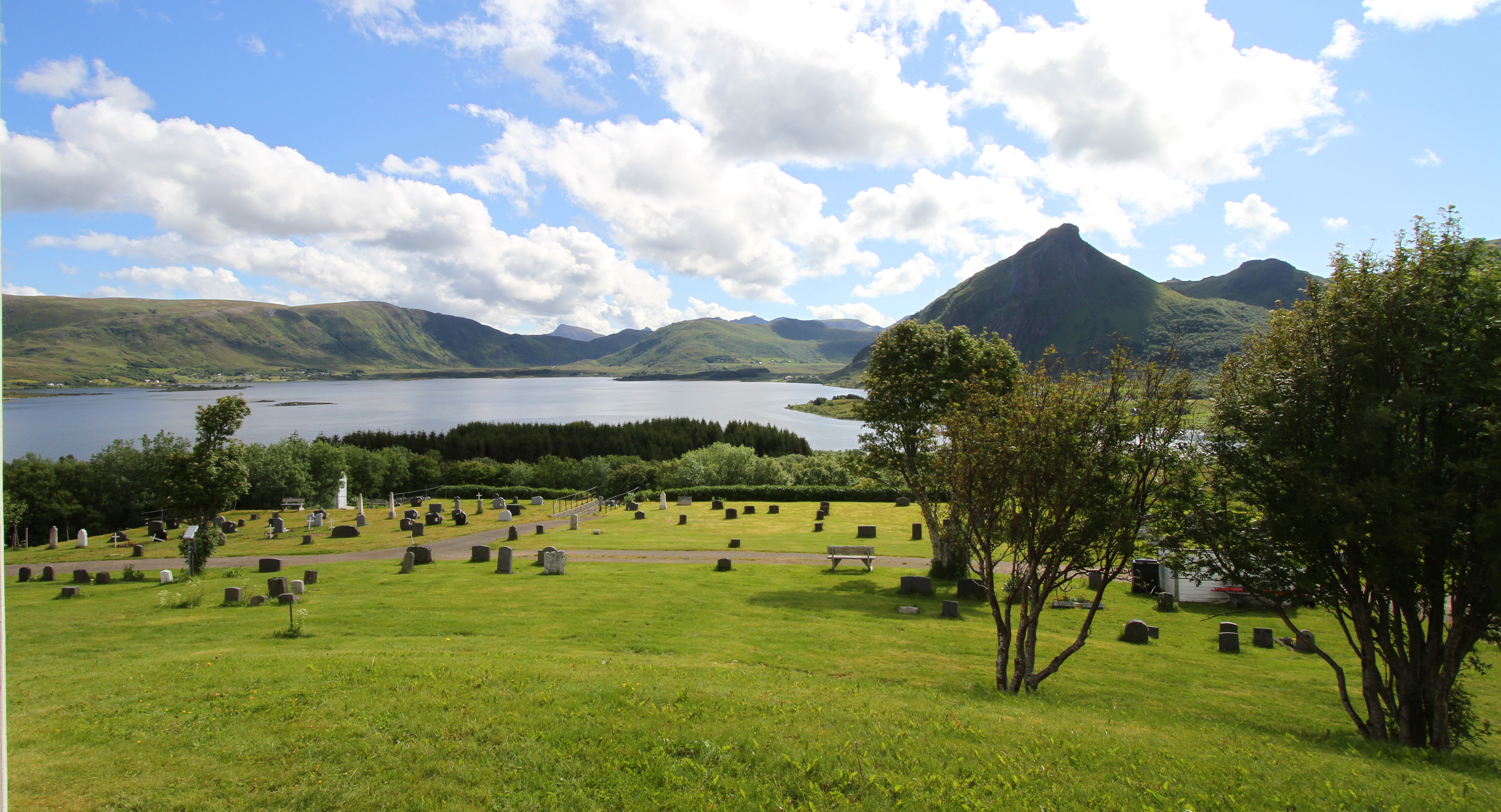

The prestegjeld of Borge was established as a municipality on 1 January 1838 (see formannskapsdistrikt law). In 1927, the southern district of Borge (population: 625) acrimoniously split off to form the new Valberg Municipality. This left Borge Municipality with 4,093 inhabitants. During the 1960s, there were many municipal mergers across Norway due to the work of the Schei Committee. On 1 January 1963, Borge Municipality (population: 4,056) was merged with the neighboring Buksnes Municipality (population: 4,416), Hol Municipality (population: 3,154), and Valberg Municipality (population: 662) to create the new Vestvågøy Municipality.

=== Name ===
The municipality (originally the parish) is named after the old Borge farm (Old Norse: Borgar) since the first Borge Church was built there. The name is the plural form of borg which means "castle" or "hill/plateau suitable for a castle".

=== Churches ===
The Church of Norway had one parish (sokn) within Borge Municipality. At the time of the municipal dissolution, it was part of the Borge prestegjeld and the Lofoten prosti (deanery) in the Diocese of Sør-Hålogaland.

Churches in Borge Municipality
Parish (sokn)	Church name	Location of the church	Year built
Borge	Borge Church	Bøstad	1898 (burned down in 1983)
Borge	Knutstad Chapel	Knutstad	1915

== Geography ==
The municipality was located on the northern part of the large island of Vestvågøya. Valberg Municipality was located to the southeast and Buksnes Municipality was located to the southwest. The highest point in the municipality is the 955.9-metre (3,136 ft) tall mountain Himmeltindan, which was located on the border with neighboring Buksnes Municipality.

== Government ==
While it existed, Borge Municipality was responsible for primary education (through 10th grade), outpatient health services, senior citizen services, welfare and other social services, zoning, economic development, and municipal roads and utilities. The municipality was governed by a municipal council of directly elected representatives. The mayor was indirectly elected by a vote of the municipal council. The municipality was under the jurisdiction of the Hålogaland Court of Appeal.

=== Municipal council ===
The municipal council (Herredsstyre) of Borge Municipality was made up of 17 representatives that were elected to four year terms. The tables below show the historical composition of the council by political party.

Borge herredsstyre 1959–1963
Party name (in Norwegian)	Number of representatives
Labour Party (Arbeiderpartiet)	5
Christian Democratic Party (Kristelig Folkeparti)	2
Joint List(s) of Non-Socialist Parties (Borgerlige Felleslister)	10
Total number of members:	17
Note: On 1 January 1963, Borge Municipality became part of Vestvågøy Municipality.

Borge herredsstyre 1955–1959
Party name (in Norwegian)	Number of representatives
Labour Party (Arbeiderpartiet)	7
Christian Democratic Party (Kristelig Folkeparti)	2
List of workers, fishermen, and small farmholders (Arbeidere, fiskere, småbrukere liste)	1
Joint List(s) of Non-Socialist Parties (Borgerlige Felleslister)	7
Total number of members:	17

Borge herredsstyre 1951–1955
Party name (in Norwegian)	Number of representatives
Labour Party (Arbeiderpartiet)	6
Christian Democratic Party (Kristelig Folkeparti)	3
List of workers, fishermen, and small farmholders (Arbeidere, fiskere, småbrukere liste)	2
Joint List(s) of Non-Socialist Parties (Borgerlige Felleslister)	5
Total number of members:	16

Borge herredsstyre 1947–1951
Party name (in Norwegian)	Number of representatives
Labour Party (Arbeiderpartiet)	8
Christian Democratic Party (Kristelig Folkeparti)	4
Joint List(s) of Non-Socialist Parties (Borgerlige Felleslister)	4
Total number of members:	16

Borge herredsstyre 1945–1947
Party name (in Norwegian)	Number of representatives
Labour Party (Arbeiderpartiet)	9
Christian Democratic Party (Kristelig Folkeparti)	3
Joint List(s) of Non-Socialist Parties (Borgerlige Felleslister)	4
Total number of members:	16

Borge herredsstyre 1937–1941*
Party name (in Norwegian)	Number of representatives
Labour Party (Arbeiderpartiet)	10
List of workers, fishermen, and small farmholders (Arbeidere, fiskere, småbrukere liste)	1
Joint List(s) of Non-Socialist Parties (Borgerlige Felleslister)	5
Total number of members:	16
Note: Due to the German occupation of Norway during World War II, no elections were held for new municipal councils until after the war ended in 1945.

=== Mayors ===
The mayor (Norwegian: ordfører) of Borge Municipality was the political leader of the municipality and the chairperson of the municipal council. Here is a list of people who have held this position:

- 1871–1884: Jens Foslie
- 1888–1889: K. Nilsen
- 1898–1900: Hans D.W. Smith
- 1900–1904: Jens Riksheim
- 1904–1905: Anton Pettersen Sand
- 1919–1934: William P. Olsen
- 1934–1941: Johan Walle (Ap)
- 1941–1942: Trygve Sand
- 1943–1944: Kristoffer Angelsen
- 1945–1951: Johan Walle (Ap)
- 1951–1962: Birger Val (H)

== See also ==
- List of former municipalities of Norway
