= Vestvågøy Municipality =

Municipality in Nordland, Norway

Vestvågøy Municipality Vestvågøy kommune
- Municipality
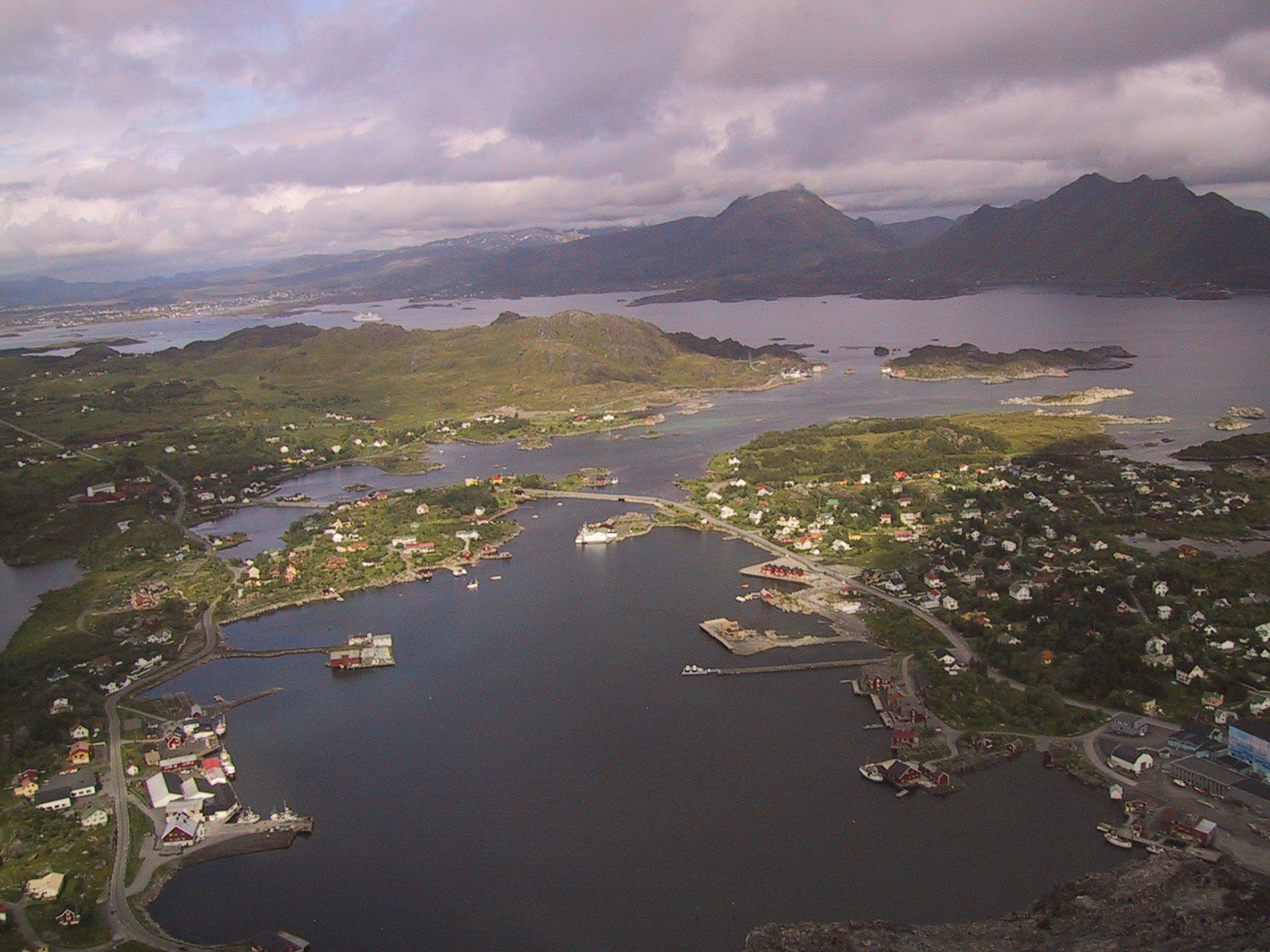
- View of Ballstad in Vestvågøy

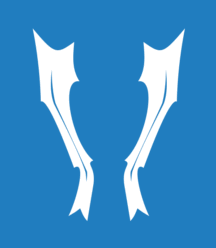
- Flag Coat of arms

- Nordland within Norway

- Vestvågøy within Nordland
- Coordinates: 68°13′17″N 13°47′04″E
- Country: Norway
- County: Nordland
- District: Lofoten
- Established: 1 Jan 1963
  - Preceded by: Borge, Buksnes, Hol, and Valberg
- Administrative centre: Leknes

Government
  - Mayor (2023): Jonny Finstad (H)

Area
  - Total: 424.29 km^{2} (163.82 sq mi)
  - Land: 406.99 km^{2} (157.14 sq mi)
  - Water: 17.30 km^{2} (6.68 sq mi) 4.1%
  - Rank: #231 in Norway
- Highest elevation: 955.91 m (3,136.2 ft)

Population (2024)
  - Total: 11,619
  - Rank: #99 in Norway
  - Density: 27.4/km^{2} (71/sq mi)
  - Change (10 years): ▲ +5.7%
- Demonym: Vestvågøyværing

Official language
  - Norwegian form: Neutral
- Time zone: UTC+01:00 (CET)
  - Summer (DST): UTC+02:00 (CEST)
- ISO 3166 code: NO-1860
- Website: Official website

Vestvågøy is a municipality in Nordland county, Norway. It is part of the traditional district of Lofoten. The administrative centre of the municipality is the town of Leknes. Some of the villages in the municipality include Ballstad, Borg, Bøstad, Gravdal, Knutstad, Stamsund, Tangstad, and Valberg. With over 11,600 inhabitants, Vestvågøy is the most populous municipality in all of the Lofoten and Vesterålen regions in Nordland county.

The Lofotr museum in Borg shows a reconstructed Iron Age Viking chieftain's residence, with a house measuring 80 metres (262 ft), built of stone and turf.

The 424-square-kilometre (164 sq mi) municipality is the 231st largest by area out of the 357 municipalities in Norway. Vestvågøy Municipality is the 99th most populous municipality in Norway with a population of 11,619. The municipality's population density is 27.4 inhabitants per square kilometre (71/sq mi) and its population has increased by 5.7% over the previous 10-year period.

In regard to the municipality possibly merging (from 2028) with Moskenes municipality: A resolution to do so has already (as of 2026) been made by [the] people of Vestvågøy.

== General information ==
The municipality of Vestvågøy was created on 1 January 1963 when the four municipalities on the island of Vestvågøya were merged into one municipality for the whole island. The old municipalities on the island were Borge Municipality (population: 4,056), Buksnes Municipality (population: 4,416), Hol Municipality (population: 3,154), and Valberg Municipality (population: 662). Initially, Vestvågøy had 12,288 residents. The borders have not changed since.

=== Name ===
The municipality is named after the island of Vestvågøya. The Old Norse name of the island was Lófót (see Lofoten), but when Lofoten became the name of the whole archipelago, the island became known as Vestvågøy. The first element of the name is the prefix vest which means "west". The middle element derives from the word vágr which means "bay" or "inlet". The last element is the definite form of the word øy which means "the island". Thus it means "the west bay island".

=== Coat of arms ===
The coat of arms was granted on 7 September 1984. The official blazon is "Azure, two stockfish addorsed" (Norwegian: I blått to opprette og motstilte sølv tørrfisker). This means the arms have a blue field (background) and the charge is two dried codfish (also known as stockfish. The fish have a tincture of argent which means they are commonly colored white, but if it is made out of metal, then silver is used. This was chosen since the municipality is one of the main Norwegian exporters of (dried) cod or stockfish and has been since the Middle Ages. The arms were designed by Kjell Kvivesen.

== Geography ==
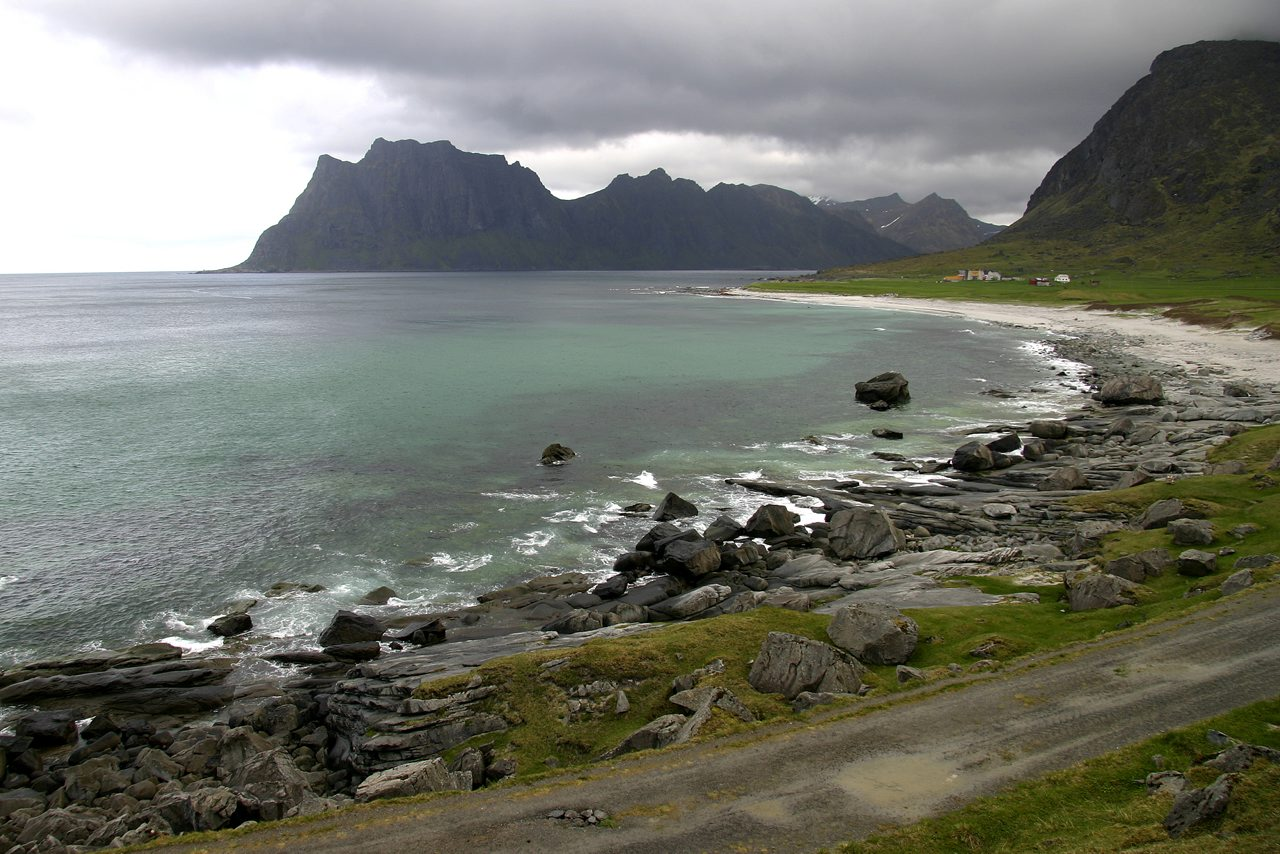
Uttakleiv beach.

Vestvågøy Municipality is among the most scenic in Norway. It encompassed the whole island of Vestvågøya with the Norwegian Sea to the north and the Vestfjorden to the south. The island has rugged cliffs and peaks facing the southeastern coast. Towards the northwest, however, the land is flat, with extensive farmlands. Most people are found in the town of Leknes and its suburb Gravdal, where Nordland Hospital Lofoten is located. Along the southeastern coast, one finds picturesque fishing villages like Ballstad and Stamsund, where the Hurtigruten (coastal ferry) stops.

The coastline is dominated by high mountains, such as the 671-metre (2,201 ft) tall Skottinden, and on the west coast also sandy white beaches. Uttakleiv the most romantic beach in Europe, according to the British newspaper The Times, and the neighbouring Hauklandsstranden is ranked by the Norwegian newspaper Dagbladet as the best beach in Norway. The highest point in the municipality is the 955.91-metre (3,136.2 ft) tall mountain Himmeltindan.

In Leknes, the sun (midnight sun) is above the horizon from May 26 until July 17, and in winter the sun does not rise from December 9 until January 4. The midnight sun is best viewed from the western beaches, such as Uttakleiv and Eggum.

=== Climate ===
There is an official weather station at Leknes Airport. Vestvågøy has the rare cold-summer mediterranean climate (Köppen Csc). Autumn and winter is much wetter than spring and summer. The driest month (July) get less than one fifth of the precipitation in the wettest month (December), fitting the mediterranean category with only 38 mm of rain, under the 40 mm required for such a classification.

Climate data for Leknes Airport 1991–2020
Month	Jan	Feb	Mar	Apr	May	Jun	Jul	Aug	Sep	Oct	Nov	Dec	Year
Mean daily maximum °C (°F)	1 (34)	1 (34)	2 (36)	6 (43)	10 (50)	12 (54)	16 (61)	15 (59)	12 (54)	8 (46)	4 (39)	3 (37)	8 (46)
Daily mean °C (°F)	0 (32)	−0.6 (30.9)	0 (32)	2.8 (37.0)	6.5 (43.7)	9.9 (49.8)	12.8 (55.0)	12.2 (54.0)	9.4 (48.9)	5.2 (41.4)	2.6 (36.7)	1 (34)	5.2 (41.3)
Mean daily minimum °C (°F)	−2 (28)	−2 (28)	−2 (28)	1 (34)	4 (39)	8 (46)	11 (52)	10 (50)	7 (45)	4 (39)	2 (36)	0 (32)	3 (38)
Average precipitation mm (inches)	203 (8.0)	174 (6.9)	161 (6.3)	93 (3.7)	74 (2.9)	45 (1.8)	38 (1.5)	78 (3.1)	123 (4.8)	161 (6.3)	173 (6.8)	223 (8.8)	1,546 (60.9)
Source: Weatheronline climate robot (avg highs/lows)

Climate data for Kvalnes, on northern Vestvågøya 1961-90
Month	Jan	Feb	Mar	Apr	May	Jun	Jul	Aug	Sep	Oct	Nov	Dec	Year
Mean daily maximum °C (°F)	1.8 (35.2)	1.4 (34.5)	2.1 (35.8)	4.4 (39.9)	8.6 (47.5)	12.2 (54.0)	14.1 (57.4)	14.0 (57.2)	10.8 (51.4)	7.3 (45.1)	4.2 (39.6)	2.5 (36.5)	7.0 (44.6)
Daily mean °C (°F)	−0.2 (31.6)	−0.3 (31.5)	0.4 (32.7)	2.6 (36.7)	6.5 (43.7)	9.5 (49.1)	11.5 (52.7)	11.9 (53.4)	8.9 (48.0)	5.7 (42.3)	2.5 (36.5)	0.5 (32.9)	5.0 (41.0)
Mean daily minimum °C (°F)	−2.5 (27.5)	−2.8 (27.0)	−2.0 (28.4)	0.2 (32.4)	3.8 (38.8)	7.2 (45.0)	9.5 (49.1)	9.7 (49.5)	6.9 (44.4)	3.5 (38.3)	0.3 (32.5)	−1.8 (28.8)	2.7 (36.9)
Average precipitation mm (inches)	117 (4.6)	93 (3.7)	89 (3.5)	70 (2.8)	48 (1.9)	50 (2.0)	71 (2.8)	68 (2.7)	111 (4.4)	153 (6.0)	126 (5.0)	139 (5.5)	1,135 (44.7)
Average precipitation days (≥ 1.0 mm)	16.2	14.2	15.1	11.7	8.9	9.9	11.5	11.0	15.8	18.0	18.2	17.7	168.2
Source: Norwegian Meteorological Institute

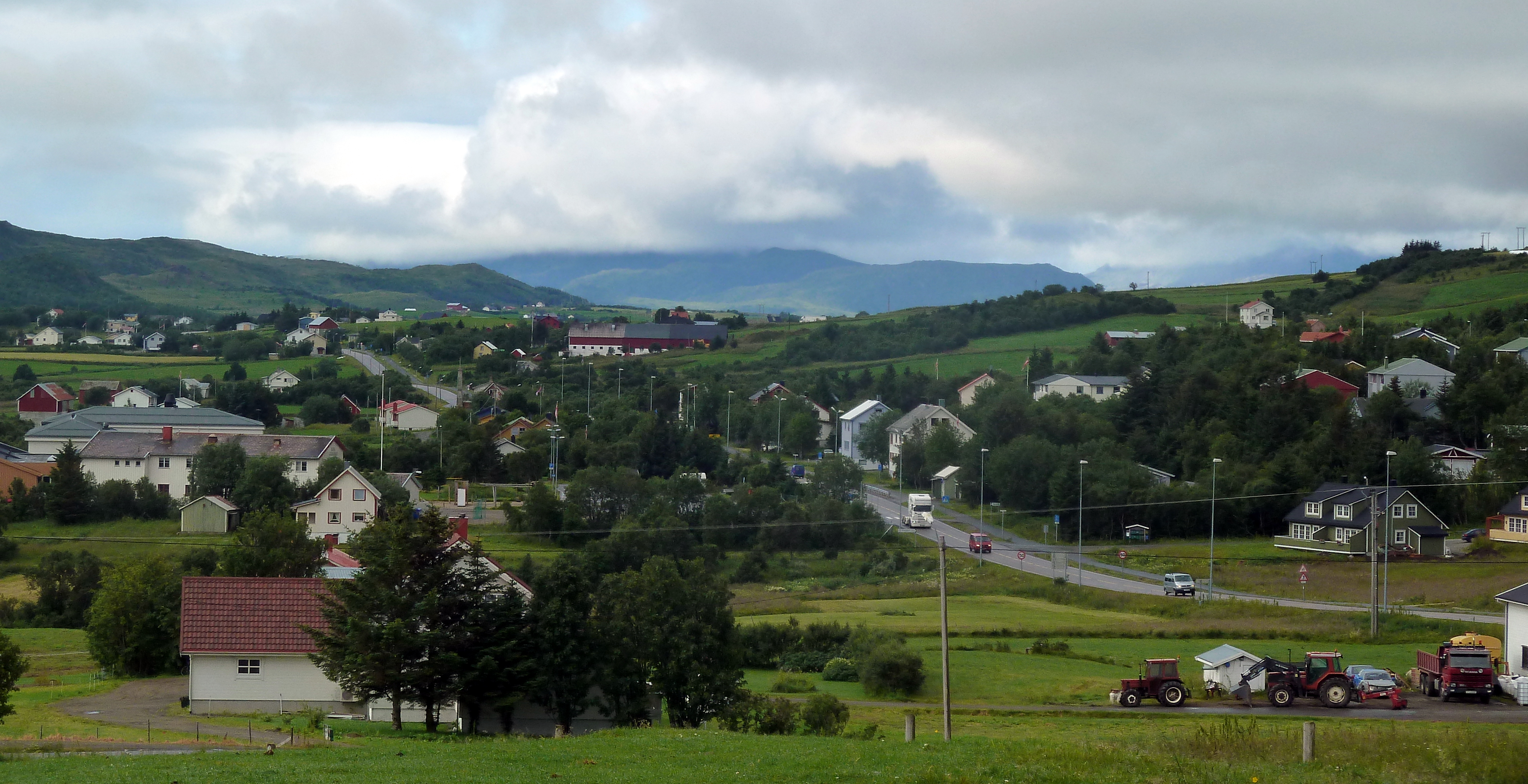
Borg in Vestvågøy

== Government ==
Vestvågøy Municipality is responsible for primary education (through 10th grade), outpatient health services, senior citizen services, welfare and other social services, zoning, economic development, and municipal roads and utilities. The municipality is governed by a municipal council of directly elected representatives. The mayor is indirectly elected by a vote of the municipal council. The municipality is under the jurisdiction of the Salten og Lofoten District Court and the Hålogaland Court of Appeal.

=== Municipal council ===
2023–present: Jonny Finstad (H) is elected mayor, until the election in Q3 2027.

The municipal council (Kommunestyre) of Vestvågøy Municipality is made up of 33 representatives that are elected to four year terms. The tables below show the current and historical composition of the council by political party.

Vestvågøy kommunestyre 2023–2027
Party name (in Norwegian)	Number of representatives
Labour Party (Arbeiderpartiet)	7
Progress Party (Fremskrittspartiet)	8
Green Party (Miljøpartiet De Grønne)	1
Conservative Party (Høyre)	7
Christian Democratic Party (Kristelig Folkeparti)	2
Norway Democrats (Norgesdemokratene)	1
Red Party (Rødt)	1
Centre Party (Senterpartiet)	3
Socialist Left Party (Sosialistisk Venstreparti)	2
Liberal Party (Venstre)	1
Total number of members:	33

Vestvågøy kommunestyre 2019–2023
Party name (in Norwegian)	Number of representatives
Labour Party (Arbeiderpartiet)	8
Progress Party (Fremskrittspartiet)	5
Green Party (Miljøpartiet De Grønne)	1
Conservative Party (Høyre)	4
Christian Democratic Party (Kristelig Folkeparti)	2
Red Party (Rødt)	1
Centre Party (Senterpartiet)	10
Socialist Left Party (Sosialistisk Venstreparti)	2
Total number of members:	33

Vestvågøy kommunestyre 2015–2019
Party name (in Norwegian)	Number of representatives
Labour Party (Arbeiderpartiet)	11
Progress Party (Fremskrittspartiet)	3
Green Party (Miljøpartiet De Grønne)	1
Conservative Party (Høyre)	8
Christian Democratic Party (Kristelig Folkeparti)	2
Centre Party (Senterpartiet)	5
Socialist Left Party (Sosialistisk Venstreparti)	2
Liberal Party (Venstre)	1
Total number of members:	33

Vestvågøy kommunestyre 2011–2015
Party name (in Norwegian)	Number of representatives
Labour Party (Arbeiderpartiet)	10
Progress Party (Fremskrittspartiet)	4
Green Party (Miljøpartiet De Grønne)	1
Conservative Party (Høyre)	10
Christian Democratic Party (Kristelig Folkeparti)	3
Centre Party (Senterpartiet)	4
Socialist Left Party (Sosialistisk Venstreparti)	2
Liberal Party (Venstre)	1
Total number of members:	35

Vestvågøy kommunestyre 2007–2011
Party name (in Norwegian)	Number of representatives
Labour Party (Arbeiderpartiet)	8
Progress Party (Fremskrittspartiet)	5
Conservative Party (Høyre)	8
Christian Democratic Party (Kristelig Folkeparti)	4
Coastal Party (Kystpartiet)	1
Centre Party (Senterpartiet)	6
Socialist Left Party (Sosialistisk Venstreparti)	2
Vestvågøy list (Vestvågøylista)	1
Total number of members:	35

Vestvågøy kommunestyre 2003–2007
Party name (in Norwegian)	Number of representatives
Labour Party (Arbeiderpartiet)	7
Progress Party (Fremskrittspartiet)	6
Conservative Party (Høyre)	3
Christian Democratic Party (Kristelig Folkeparti)	4
Coastal Party (Kystpartiet)	1
Centre Party (Senterpartiet)	6
Socialist Left Party (Sosialistisk Venstreparti)	4
Joint list of the Red Electoral Alliance (Rød Valgallianse) and the Communist Party (Kommunistiske Parti)	1
Vestvågøy list (Vestvågøylista)	3
Total number of members:	35

Vestvågøy kommunestyre 1999–2003
Party name (in Norwegian)	Number of representatives
Labour Party (Arbeiderpartiet)	7
Progress Party (Fremskrittspartiet)	6
Conservative Party (Høyre)	3
Christian Democratic Party (Kristelig Folkeparti)	6
Coastal Party (Kystpartiet)	1
Centre Party (Senterpartiet)	6
Socialist Left Party (Sosialistisk Venstreparti)	2
Joint list of the Red Electoral Alliance (Rød Valgallianse) and the Communist Party (Kommunistiske Parti)	1
Vestvågøy list (Vestvågøylista)	3
Total number of members:	35

Vestvågøy kommunestyre 1995–1999
Party name (in Norwegian)	Number of representatives
Labour Party (Arbeiderpartiet)	5
Progress Party (Fremskrittspartiet)	5
Conservative Party (Høyre)	3
Christian Democratic Party (Kristelig Folkeparti)	6
Centre Party (Senterpartiet)	11
Socialist Left Party (Sosialistisk Venstreparti)	1
Vestvågøy list (Vestvågoylista)	4
Total number of members:	35

Vestvågøy kommunestyre 1991–1995
Party name (in Norwegian)	Number of representatives
Labour Party (Arbeiderpartiet)	9
Progress Party (Fremskrittspartiet)	2
Conservative Party (Høyre)	7
Christian Democratic Party (Kristelig Folkeparti)	5
Pensioners' Party (Pensjonistpartiet)	1
Centre Party (Senterpartiet)	12
Socialist Left Party (Sosialistisk Venstreparti)	4
Hol and Valberg district list (Hol og Valberg Distriktliste)	3
Total number of members:	43

Vestvågøy kommunestyre 1987–1991
Party name (in Norwegian)	Number of representatives
Labour Party (Arbeiderpartiet)	13
Progress Party (Fremskrittspartiet)	2
Conservative Party (Høyre)	9
Christian Democratic Party (Kristelig Folkeparti)	6
Pensioners' Party (Pensjonistpartiet)	1
Centre Party (Senterpartiet)	5
Socialist Left Party (Sosialistisk Venstreparti)	2
Hol and Valberg district list (Hol og Valberg distriktsliste)	5
Total number of members:	43

Vestvågøy kommunestyre 1983–1987
Party name (in Norwegian)	Number of representatives
Labour Party (Arbeiderpartiet)	15
Progress Party (Fremskrittspartiet)	1
Conservative Party (Høyre)	8
Christian Democratic Party (Kristelig Folkeparti)	5
Centre Party (Senterpartiet)	7
Socialist Left Party (Sosialistisk Venstreparti)	1
Liberal Party (Venstre)	1
For the referendum (For Folkeavstemning)	1
Hol and Valberg district list (Hol og Valberg distriktslista)	4
Total number of members:	43

Vestvågøy kommunestyre 1979–1983
Party name (in Norwegian)	Number of representatives
Labour Party (Arbeiderpartiet)	15
Progress Party (Fremskrittspartiet)	2
Conservative Party (Høyre)	8
Christian Democratic Party (Kristelig Folkeparti)	7
Centre Party (Senterpartiet)	6
Socialist Left Party (Sosialistisk Venstreparti)	1
Liberal Party (Venstre)	1
Hol and Valberg district list (Hol og Valberg distriktsliste)	3
Total number of members:	43

Vestvågøy kommunestyre 1975–1979
Party name (in Norwegian)	Number of representatives
Labour Party (Arbeiderpartiet)	16
Anders Lange's Party (Anders Langes parti)	3
Conservative Party (Høyre)	5
Christian Democratic Party (Kristelig Folkeparti)	8
Centre Party (Senterpartiet)	9
Socialist Left Party (Sosialistisk Venstreparti)	1
Liberal Party (Venstre)	1
Total number of members:	43

Vestvågøy kommunestyre 1971–1975
Party name (in Norwegian)	Number of representatives
Labour Party (Arbeiderpartiet)	18
Conservative Party (Høyre)	5
Christian Democratic Party (Kristelig Folkeparti)	4
Centre Party (Senterpartiet)	8
Socialist People's Party (Sosialistisk Folkeparti)	1
Liberal Party (Venstre)	1
Local List(s) (Lokale lister)	6
Total number of members:	43

Vestvågøy kommunestyre 1967–1971
Party name (in Norwegian)	Number of representatives
Labour Party (Arbeiderpartiet)	17
Conservative Party (Høyre)	7
Christian Democratic Party (Kristelig Folkeparti)	3
Centre Party (Senterpartiet)	7
Socialist People's Party (Sosialistisk Folkeparti)	2
Liberal Party (Venstre)	2
Local List(s) (Lokale lister)	5
Total number of members:	43

Vestvågøy kommunestyre 1963–1967
Party name (in Norwegian)	Number of representatives
Labour Party (Arbeiderpartiet)	24
Conservative Party (Høyre)	10
Christian Democratic Party (Kristelig Folkeparti)	4
Centre Party (Senterpartiet)	9
Socialist People's Party (Sosialistisk Folkeparti)	1
Liberal Party (Venstre)	3
Local List(s) (Lokale lister)	2
Total number of members:	53
Note: Vestvågøy Municipality was established on 1 January 1963 when Borge Municipality, Buksnes Municipality, Hol Municipality, and Valberg Municipality were merged.

== Transportation ==
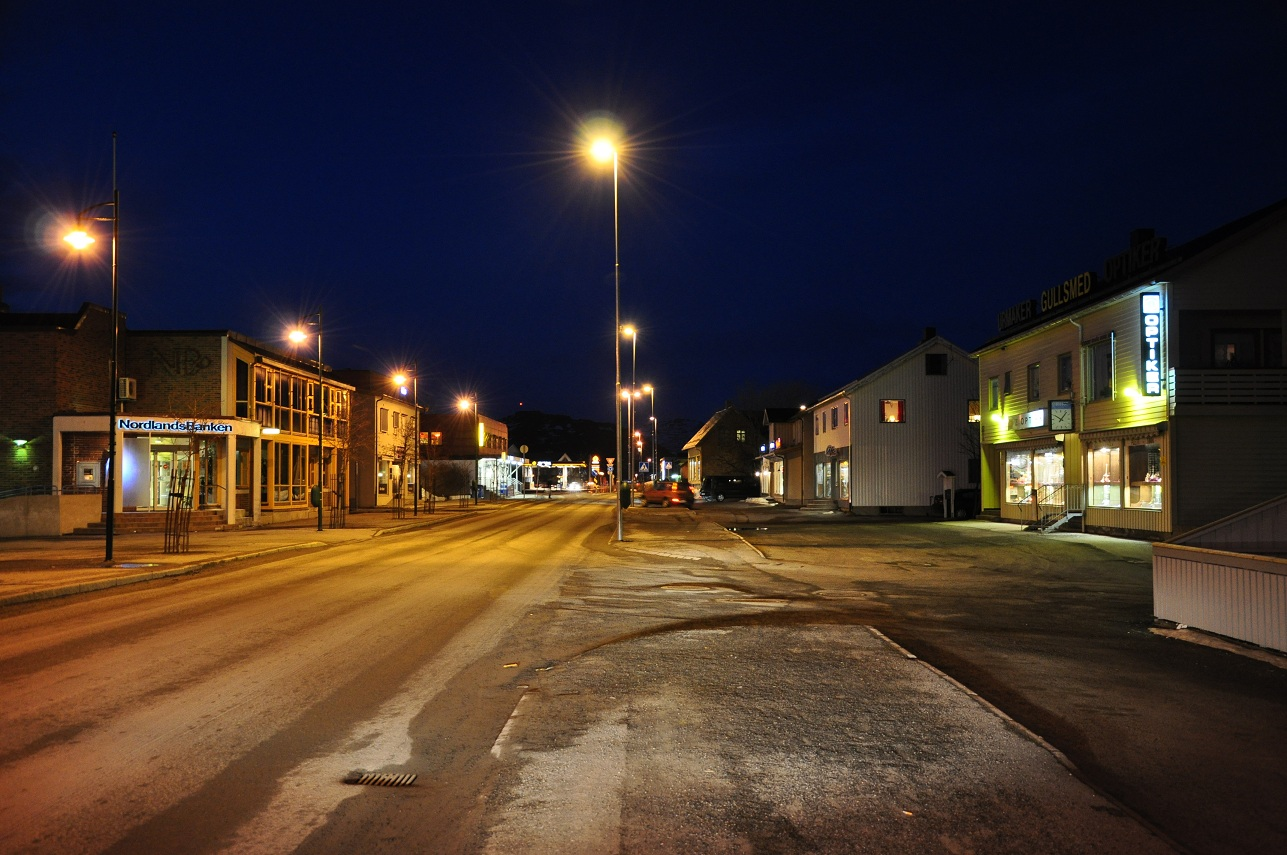
Main street of Leknes by night

Leknes is the municipal and administrative centre and is situated in the geographical middle of Lofoten, approximately 68 kilometres (42 mi) west of the town of Svolvær and 65 kilometres (40 mi) east of the village of Å. Leknes is the trading and shopping centre of Lofoten, only rivaled by Svolvær. Leknes Airport is for smaller aircraft, with 7 daily scheduled flights to Bodø Airport and some daily flights to Svolvær and Røst Airport with Widerøe airlines. There is a small bus terminal which serves as a hub with bus links to the rest of Lofoten. The Leknes Havn (harbor) is one of Norway's most important and visited harbors for cruise ships. The Hurtigruten boats have been an important means of communication and transportation for a century. It docks in Stamsund twice every night, one heading south towards Bodø the other heading north towards Svolvær.

The European route E10 highway crosses the municipality (and island) with the Sundklakkstraumen Bridge connecting to Vågan Municipality in the north and the Nappstraumen Tunnel connecting to Flakstad Municipality in the south.

== Culture ==
Unstad Beach, at Unstad, has been used for surfing since 1963.

=== Churches ===
The Church of Norway has five parishes (sokn) within Vestvågøy Municipality. It is part of the Lofoten prosti (deanery) in the Diocese of Sør-Hålogaland.

Churches in Vestvågøy Municipality
Parish (sokn)	Church name	Location of the church	Year built
Borge	Borge Church	Bøstad	1986
Borge	Knutstad Chapel	Knutstad	1915
Buksnes	Buksnes Church	Gravdal	1905
Hol	Hol Church	Leknes	1806
Stamsund	Stamsund Church	Stamsund	1937
Valberg	Valberg Church	Valberg	1889

== International relations ==
=== Twin towns – Sister cities ===
Vestvågøy has sister city agreements with the following places:

- Skeiða- og Gnúpverjahreppur, Iceland

== Notable people ==
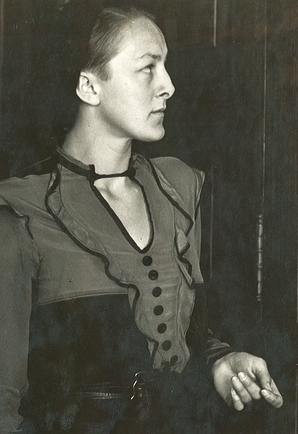
Edvarda Lie, 1935

- Hartvig Jentoft (1693 in Borge – 1739), a tradesman and sailor
- Karl Uchermann (1855 in Borge – 1940), a painter of dogs and altarpieces
- Mikael Heggelund Foslie (1855 in Borge – 1909), a botanist and algaeologist
- Jens R. Nilssen (1880 in Valberg – 1964), an illustrator, comics creator, and cartoonist
- Edvarda Lie (1910–1963), a painter, drawer, and illustrator who was brought up in Vestvågøy
- Boy Rist (1912 in Gravdal – 1972), a naval officer and member of the Norwegian resistance in WWII
- Harald Sverdrup (1923 in Gravdal – 1992), a poet and children's writer
- Kari Wærness (born 1939 in Leknes), a sociologist
- Søren Fredrik Voie (born 1949 in Vestvågøy), a politician who was Mayor of Vestvågøy from 1983-1987
- Guri Ingebrigtsen (1952–2020), a politician who was Mayor of Vestvågøy from 1999 to 2007
- Aga Khan V (born 1971), who bought a house in Unstad in 2019 (before succeeding to the Imamate)

=== Mayors ===
The mayor (Norwegian: ordfører) of Vestvågøy Municipality is the political leader of the municipality and the chairperson of the municipal council. Here is a list of people who have held this position:

- 1963–1963: Alsing Wik (H)
- 1964–1967: Walter Tjønndal (Ap)
- 1968–1969: Boy Rist (H)
- 1970–1971: Karl Leirfall (Sp)
- 1972–1973: Eivind Bolle (Ap)
- 1974–1975: Johannes Sundrønning (Ap)
- 1976–1977: Petter Limstrand (Sp)
- 1978–1981: Johannes Sundrønning (Ap)
- 1982–1983: Petter Limstrand (Sp)
- 1984–1987: Søren Fredrik Voie (H)
- 1988–1991: Karl Sverre Klevstad (KrF)
- 1992–1999: Frank Rist (Sp)
- 1999–2007: Guri Ingebrigtsen (Ap)
- 2007–2015: Jonny Finstad (H)
- 2015–2023: Remi Solberg (Ap)

== Media gallery ==
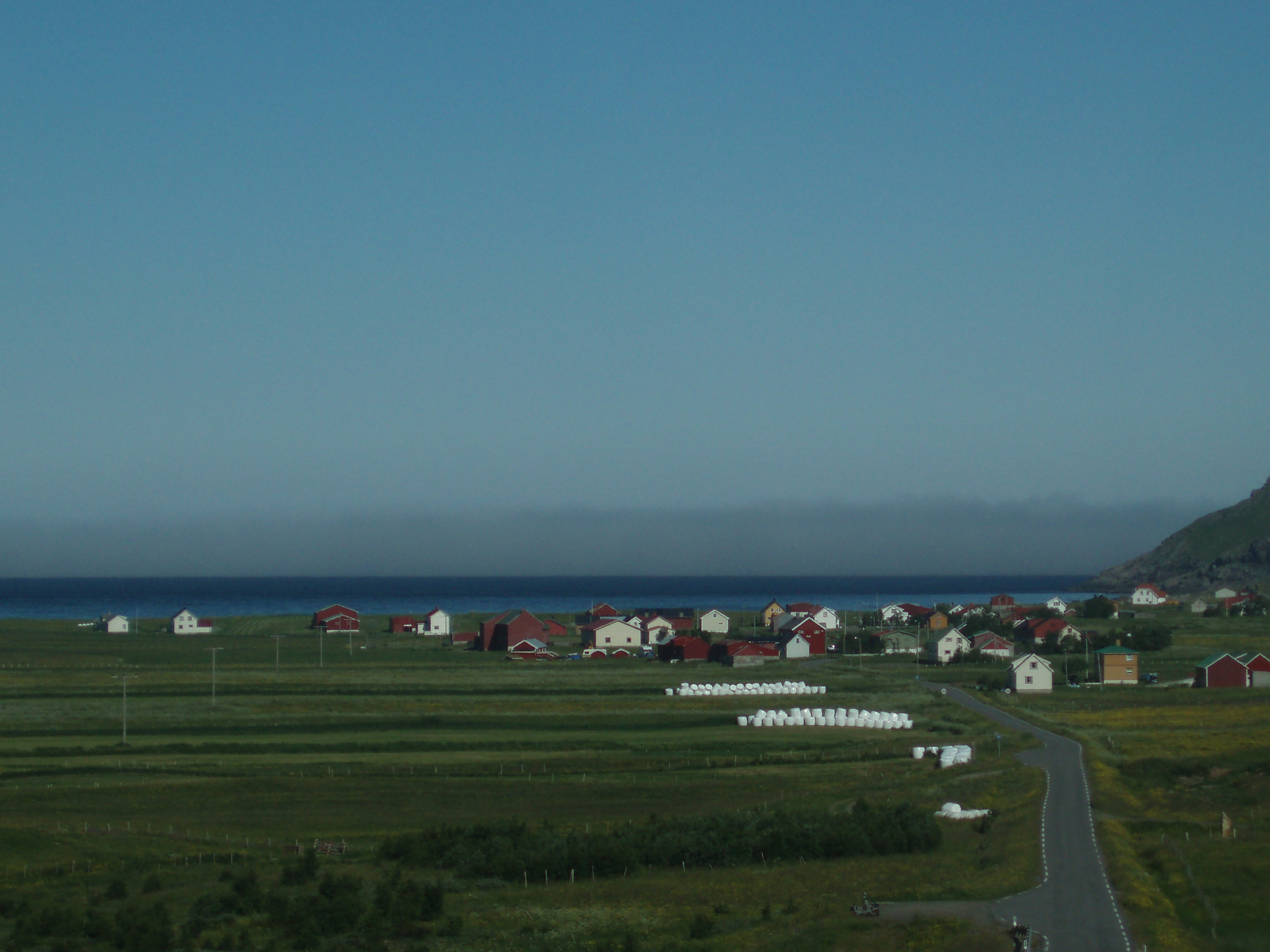
Unstad; Vestvågøy has the largest areas of lowland in Lofoten

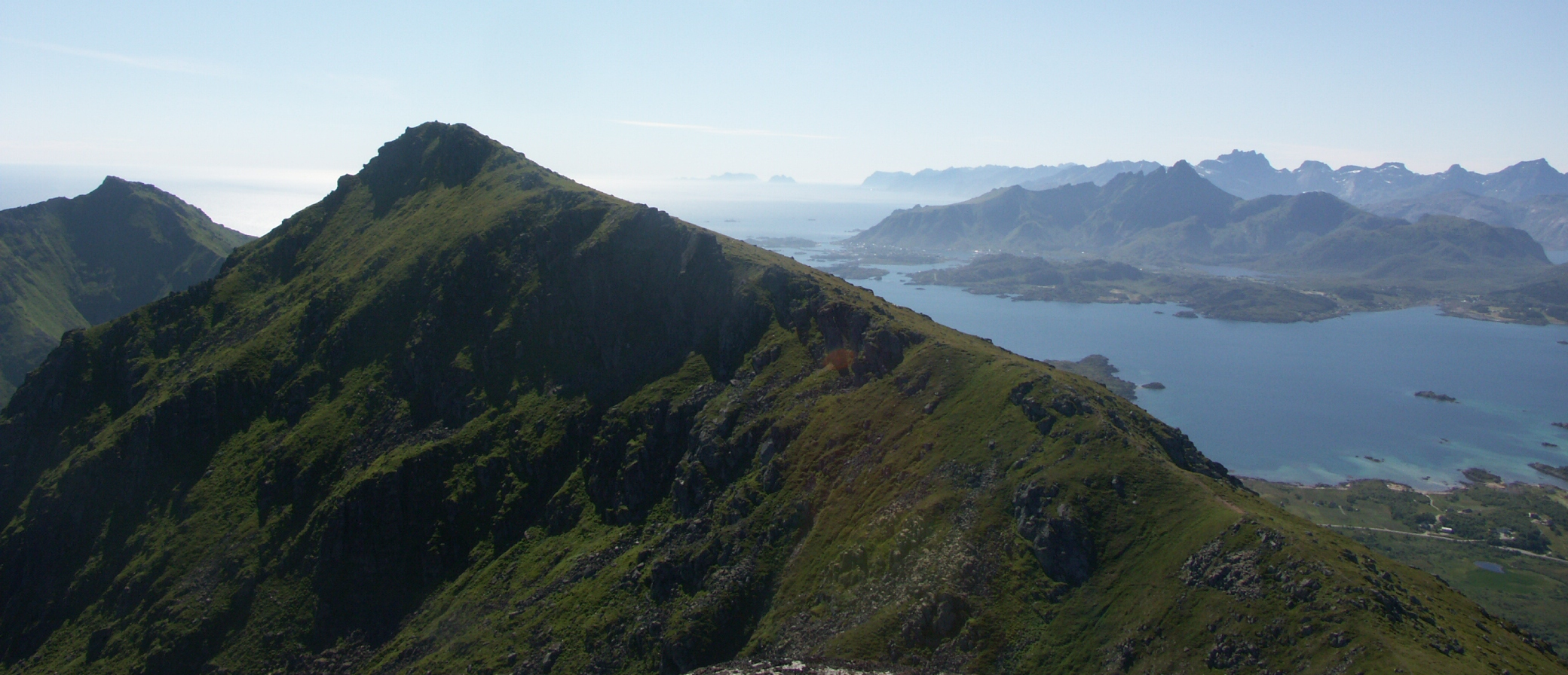
View south-west from the summit of Bulitinden

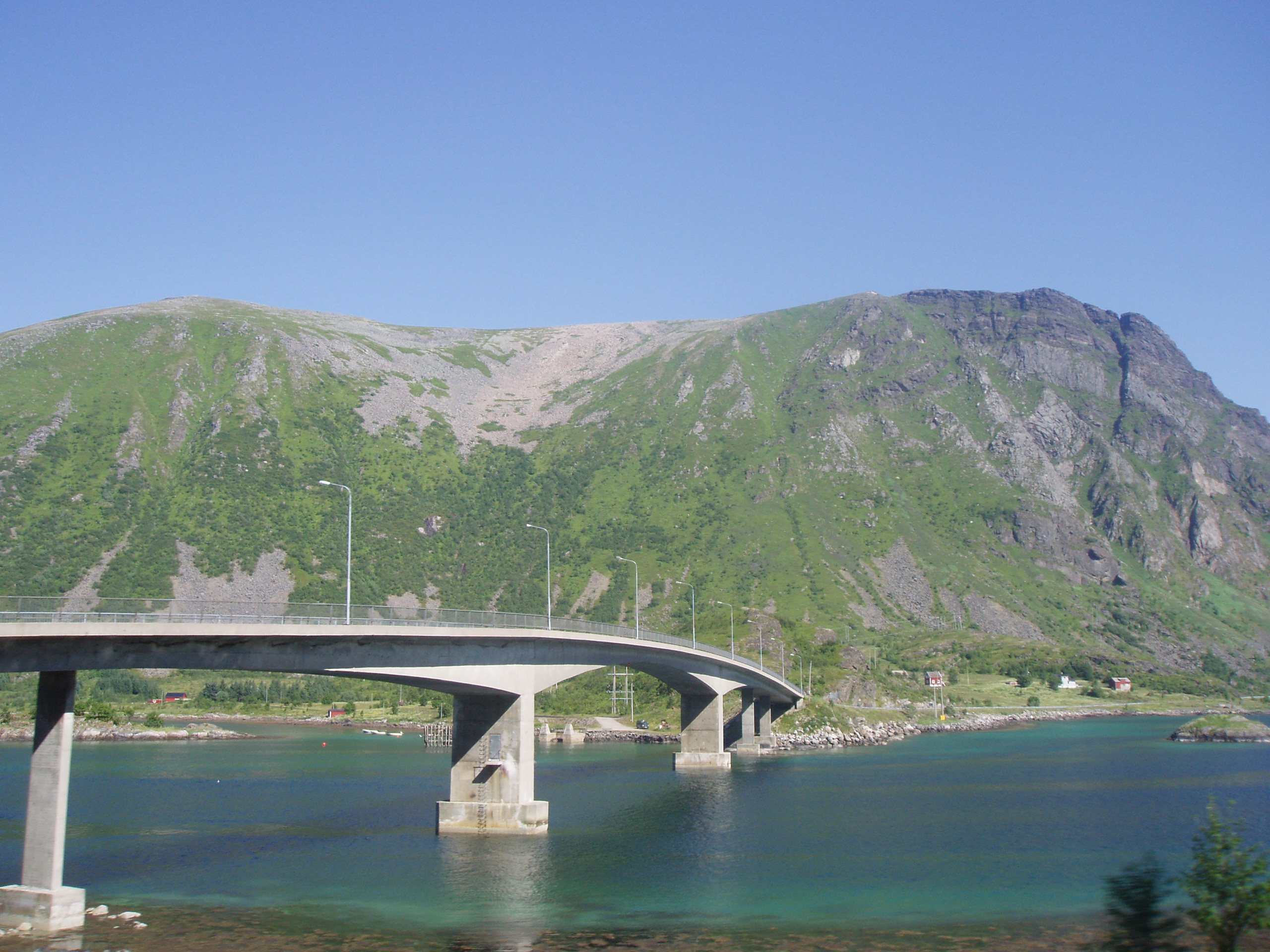
Sundklakkstraumen Bridge

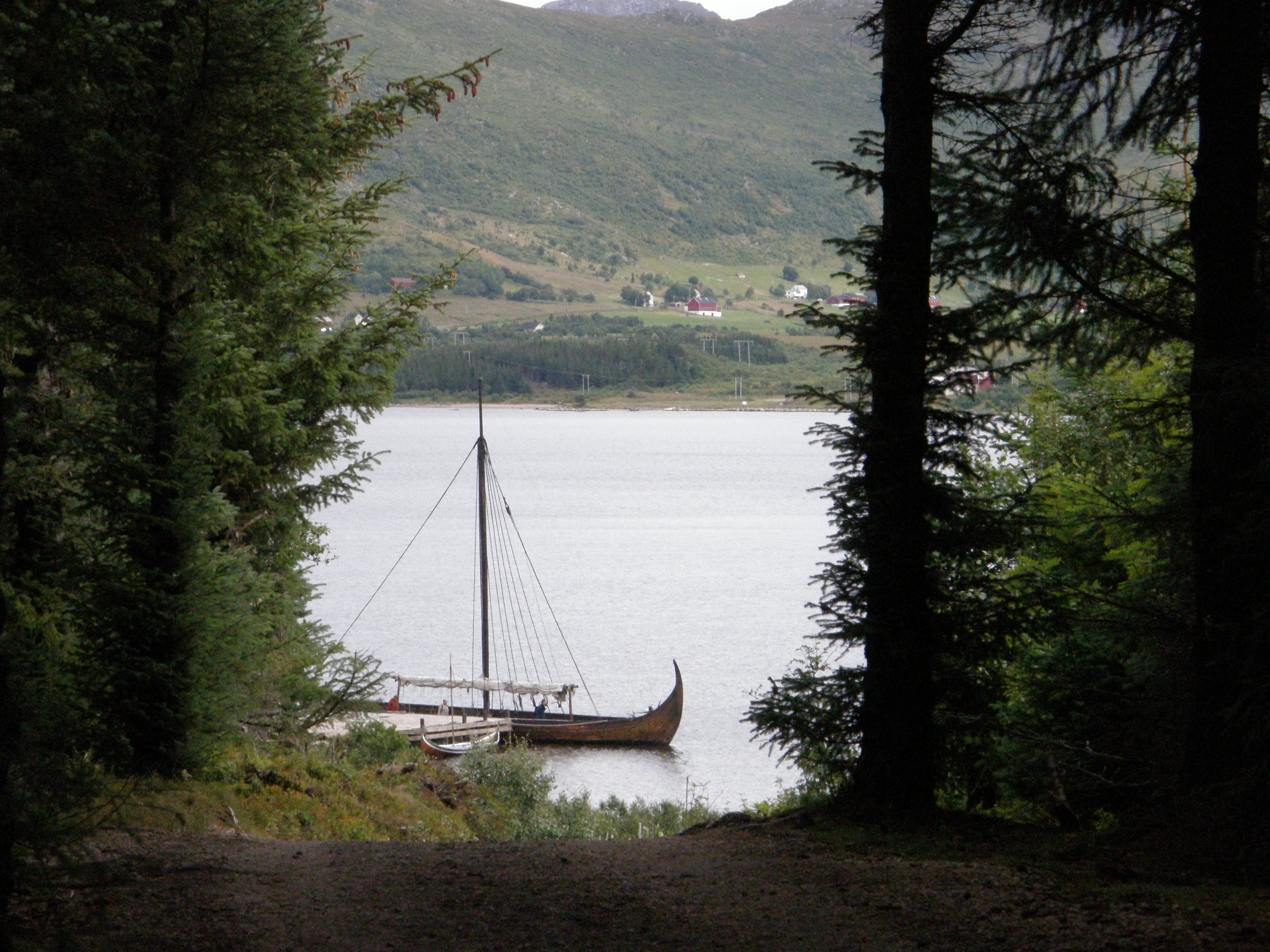
Near Borg in Vestvågøy

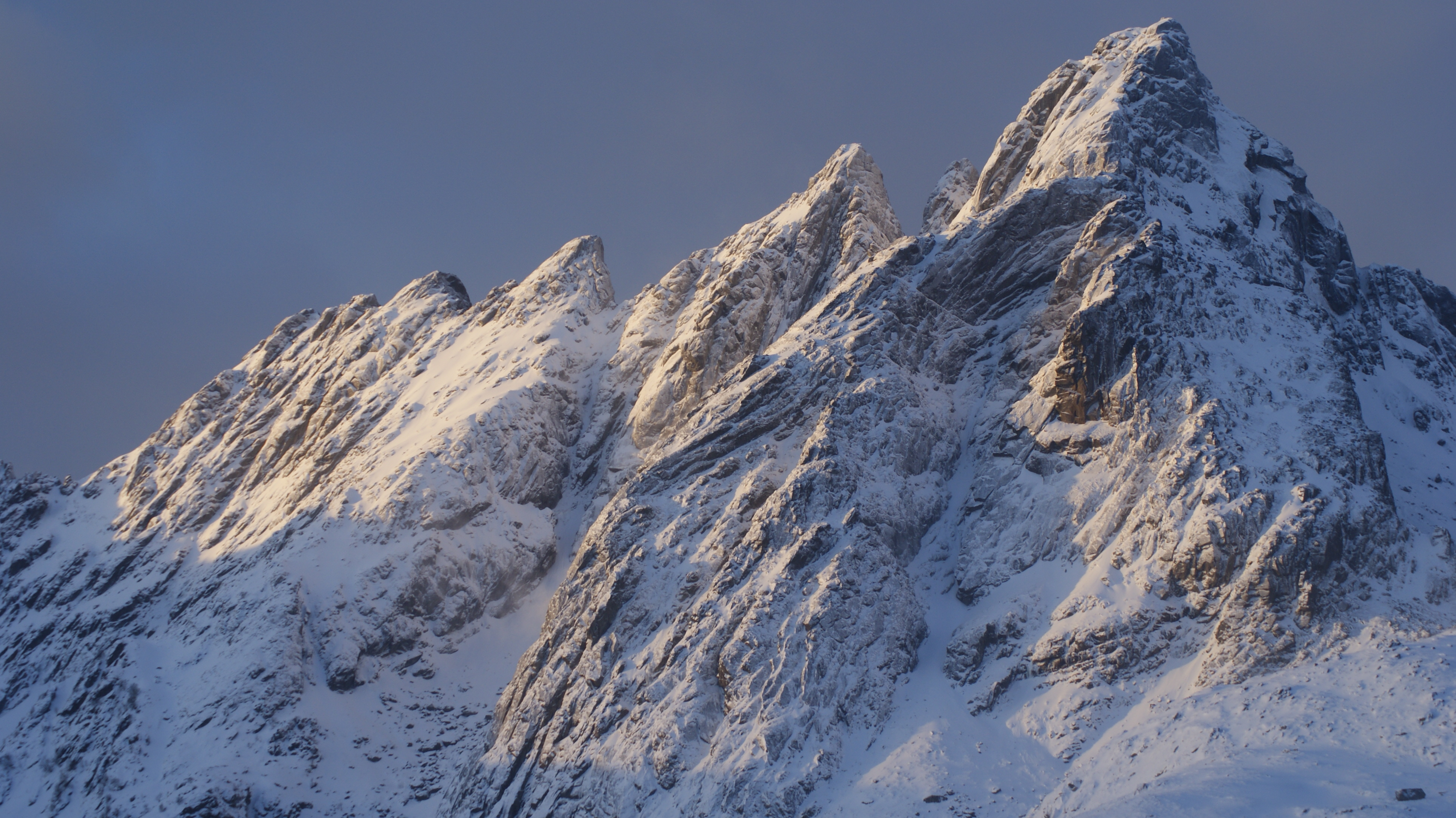
The mountain Skottinden in winter sunshine
