= Hartvig Jentoft =

Norwegian tradesman and sailor

- Born: 1693; Borg, Lofoten
- Died: 1 December 1739 (aged 45–46)
- Occupations: Tradesman and sailor

Hartvig Hansen Jentoft (1693 – 1 December 1739) was a Norwegian tradesman and sailor.

Jentoft was born in the village of Borg on the island of Vestvågøya in the present-day county of Nordland. He was the son of Hans Hansen Jentoft (d. 1718) and Ingeborg Hartvigsdatter (d. by 1734). His father was the residing chaplain at Borge Church where his uncle Arent Hartvigsen was parish priest. Jentoft joined Hans Egede on his Greenland expedition in 1721. Jentoft worked as merchant for the Bergen Greenland Company (Det Bergen Grønlandske Compagnie) on Nipisat Island at the first Dano-Norwegian colony until the fall of 1725. Jentoft later settled at Buksnes in Lofoten. He lived there as a skipper, sailor and landlord. In 1727, he was married to Maren Røst (d. 1737) and after her death, he married Karen Schøning (d. 1755). He perished at sea in 1739.
