= Tangstad =

Village in Vestvågøy Municipality, Norway

- Village
- Interactive map of Tangstad
- Location within Nordland Location within Norway
- Coordinates: 68.2424°N 13.6463°E
- Country: Norway
- Region: Northern Norway
- County: Nordland
- District: Lofoten
- Municipality: Vestvågøy Municipality
- Elevation: 20 m (66 ft)
- Time zone: UTC+01:00 (CET)
  - Summer (DST): UTC+02:00 (CEST)
- Post Code: 8360 Bøstad

Tangstad is a village in Vestvågøy Municipality in Nordland county, Norway. The village is located on the northwestern side of the island of Vestvågøya, about 5 kilometres (3.1 mi) west of the village of Bøstad and about 15 kilometres (9.3 mi) north of the town of Leknes.
