= Knutstad =

Village in Vestvågøy Municipality, Norway

- Village
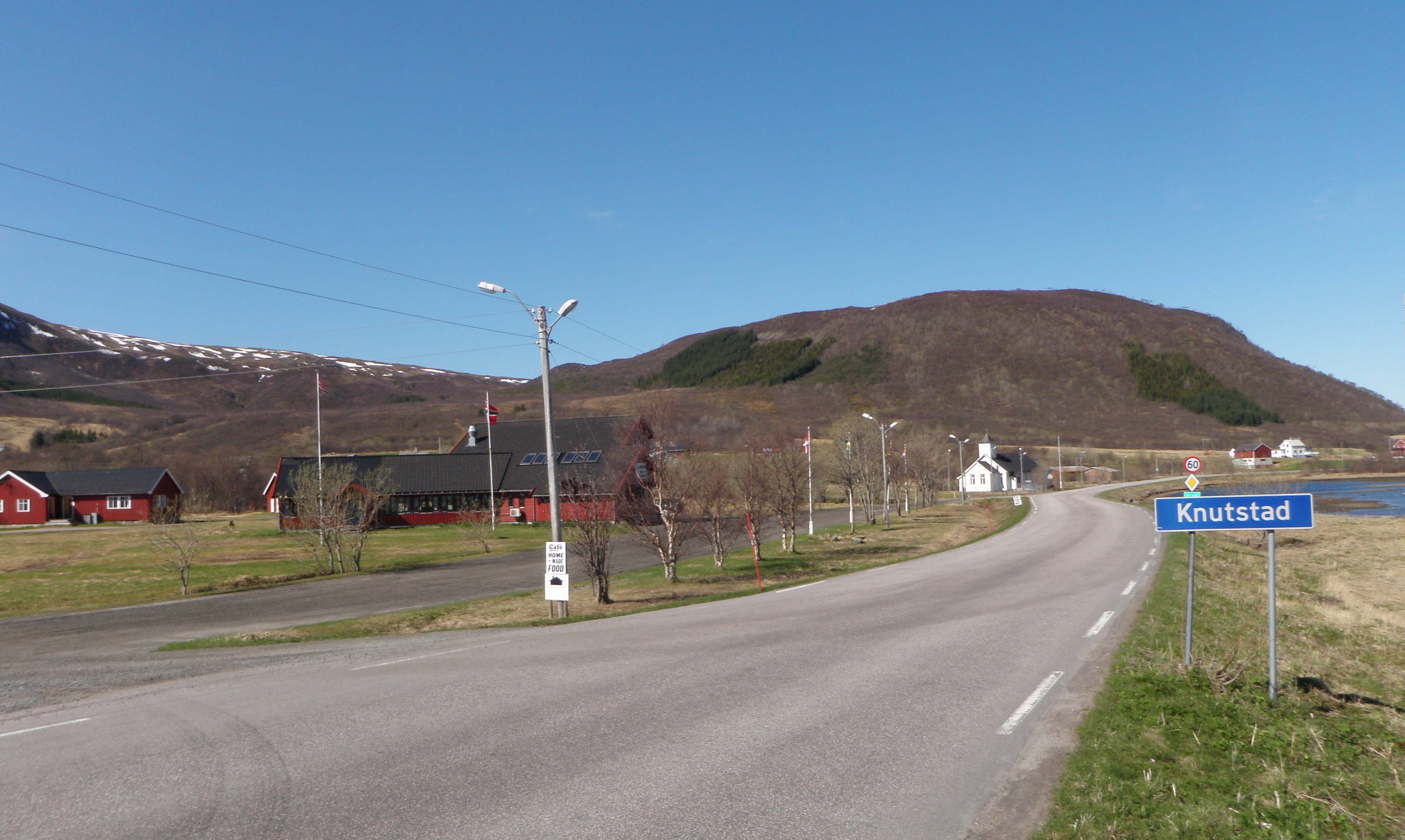
- View of the village, with Knutstad Chapel in the distance
- Interactive map of Knutstad
- Location within Nordland Location within Norway
- Coordinates: 68.2716°N 13.9282°E
- Country: Norway
- Region: Northern Norway
- County: Nordland
- District: Lofoten
- Municipality: Vestvågøy Municipality
- Elevation: 14 m (46 ft)
- Time zone: UTC+01:00 (CET)
  - Summer (DST): UTC+02:00 (CEST)
- Post Code: 8360 Bøstad

Knutstad is a village in Vestvågøy Municipality in Nordland county, Norway. The village is located on the northeastern part of the island of Vestvågøya, along the European route E10 highway, about 9 kilometres (5.6 mi) east of the village of Bøstad. Knutstad Chapel is located in the village.
