= Jentoft =

Jentoft is a given name and surname. Notable people with the name include:

- Jentoft Jensen (1901–1953), Norwegian politician
- Hartvig Jentoft (1693–1739), Norwegian tradesman and sailor
- Morten Jentoft (born 1956), Norwegian journalist
