= Karl Sverre Klevstad =

Norwegian politician (1926–2023)

Karl Sverre Klevstad (29 June 1926 – 11 May 2023) was a Norwegian politician for the Christian Democratic Party.

== Biography ==
Klevstad was born in Borge Municipality on 29 June 1926. He was elected to the Norwegian Parliament from Nordland in 1973, and was re-elected on one occasion. He served as a deputy representative during the term 1981–1985.

On the local level Klevstad was a member of the municipal council of Vestvågøy Municipality from 1971 to 1975, and later served as mayor there from 1987 to 1991.

Klevstad died on 11 May 2023, at the age of 96.
