= Borg, Vestvågøy =

Village in Vestvågøy Municipality, Norway

Borg
- Hamlet
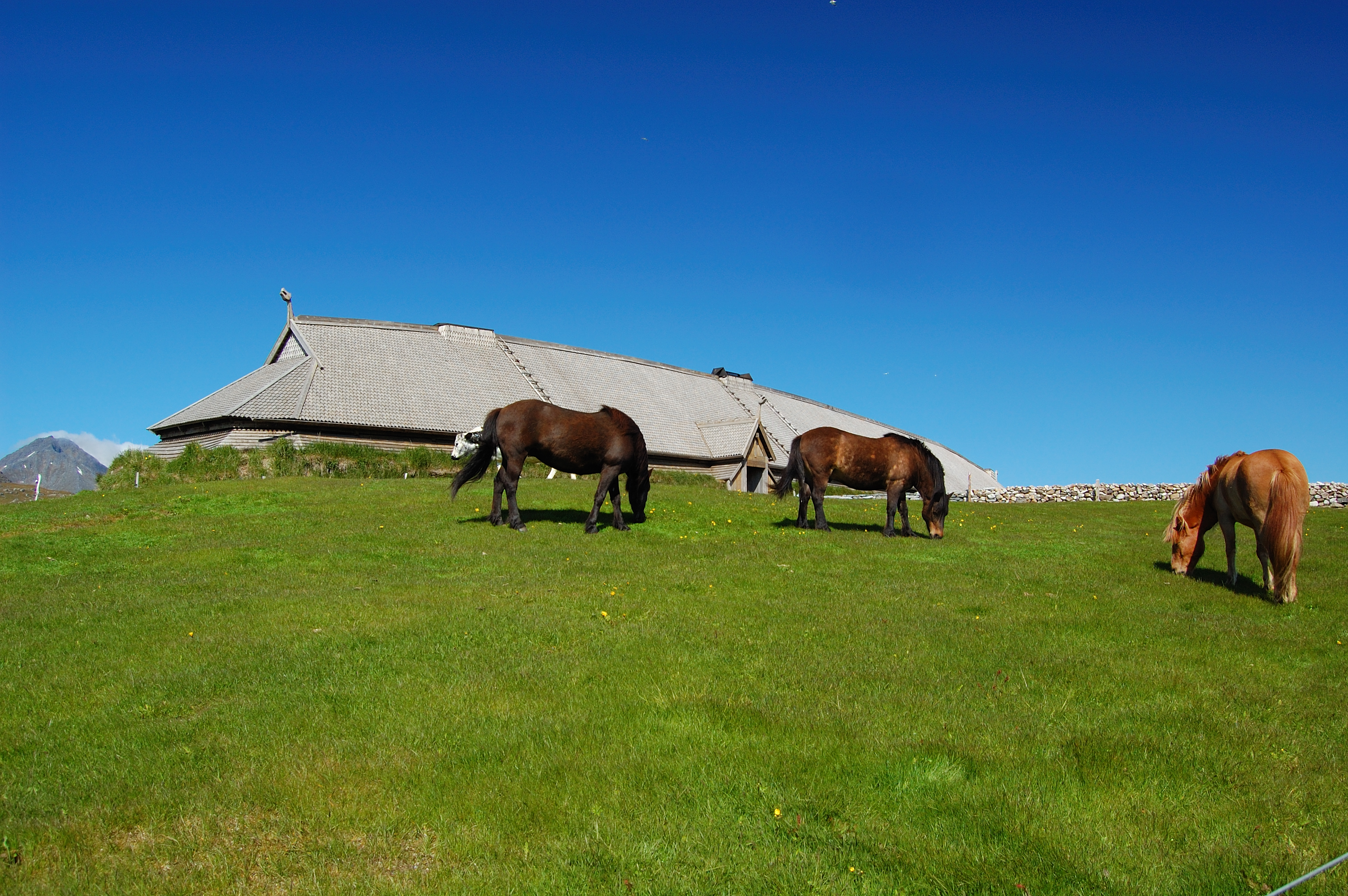
- Lofotr, a Viking museum situated in Borg
- Interactive map of Borg
- Location within Nordland Location within Norway
- Coordinates: 68.2390°N 13.7461°E
- Country: Norway
- Region: Northern Norway
- County: Nordland
- District: Lofoten
- Municipality: Vestvågøy Municipality
- Elevation: 40 m (130 ft)
- Time zone: UTC+01:00 (CET)
  - Summer (DST): UTC+02:00 (CEST)
- Post Code: 8360 Bøstad

Borg is a tiny hamlet just north of the village of Bøstad in Vestvågøy Municipality in Nordland county, Norway. It is located along the European route E10 highway in the central part of the island of Vestvågøya in the Lofoten archipelago. Borge Church is located near Borg.

== Overview ==
Borg was the home of a Viking chieftain over 1,000 years ago. Today, Borg is the location of Lofotr, a living museum of the Viking chieftain's village. This is the site of a reconstruction of one of the main buildings as well as visible remains within the archaeological excavation sites.

The area around Borg has many horses, most of which are Nordlandshester.

== Gallery ==
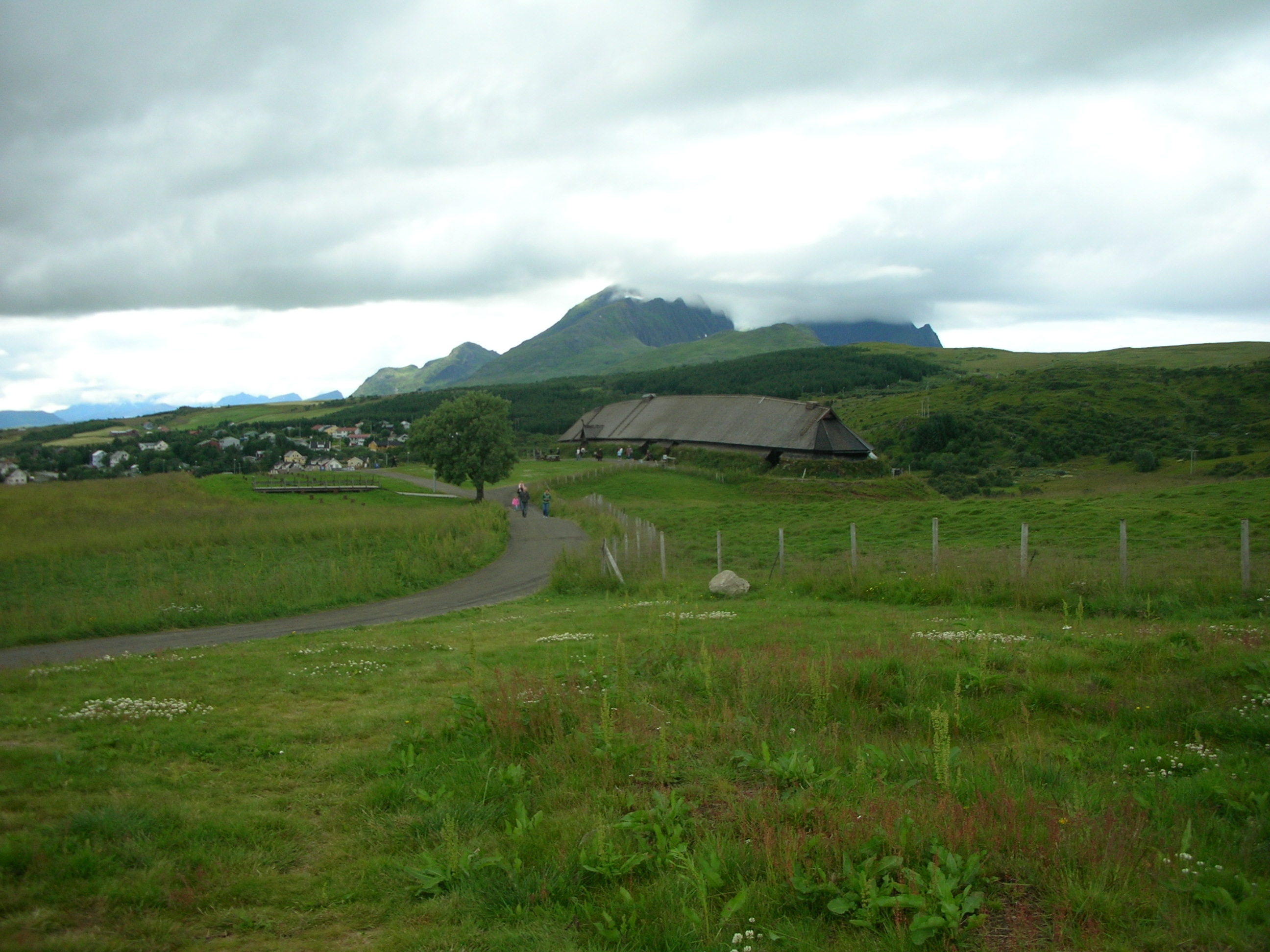
View of the museum

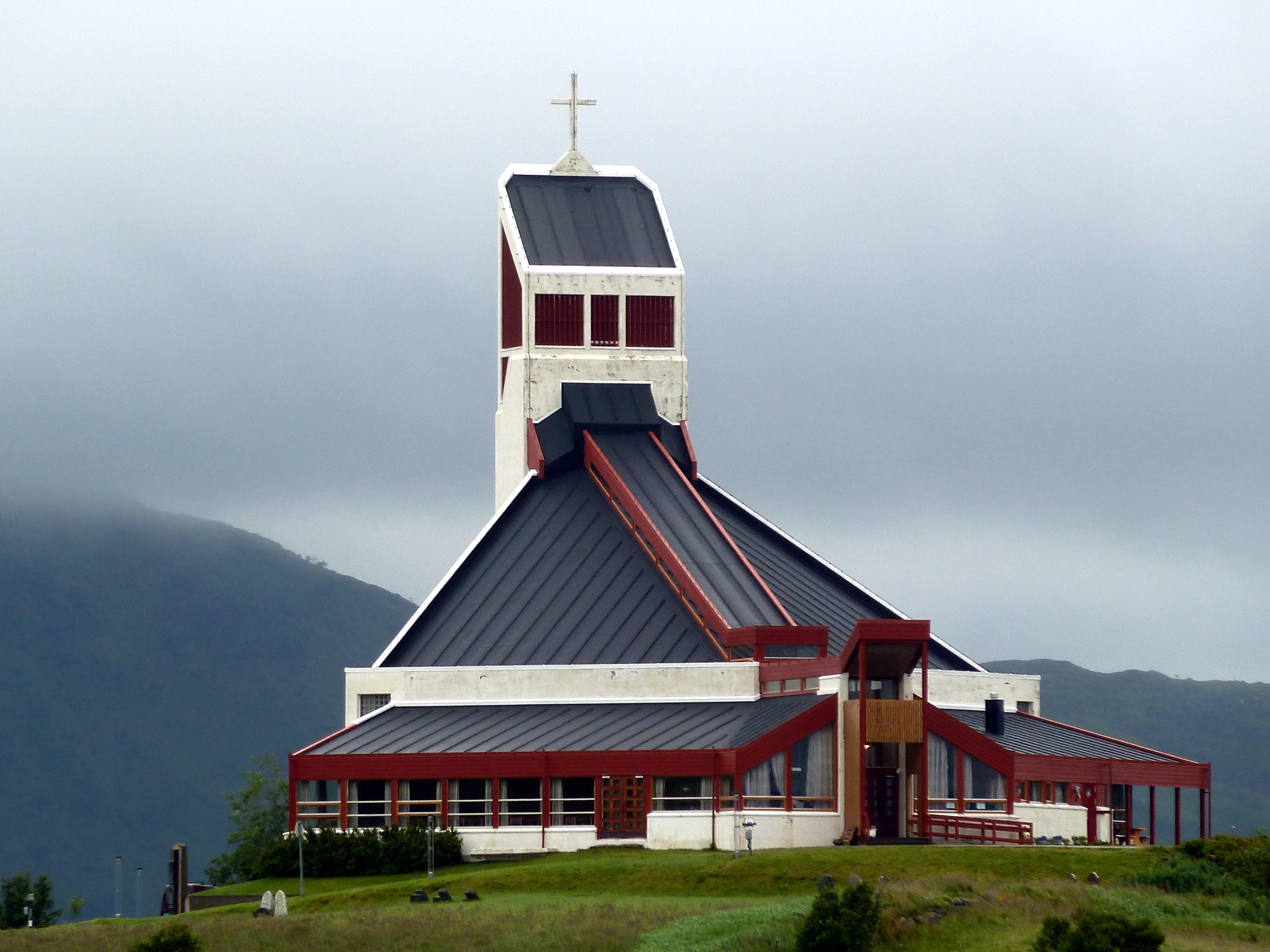
Village church
