= Søren Fredrik Voie =

Norwegian politician (born 1949)

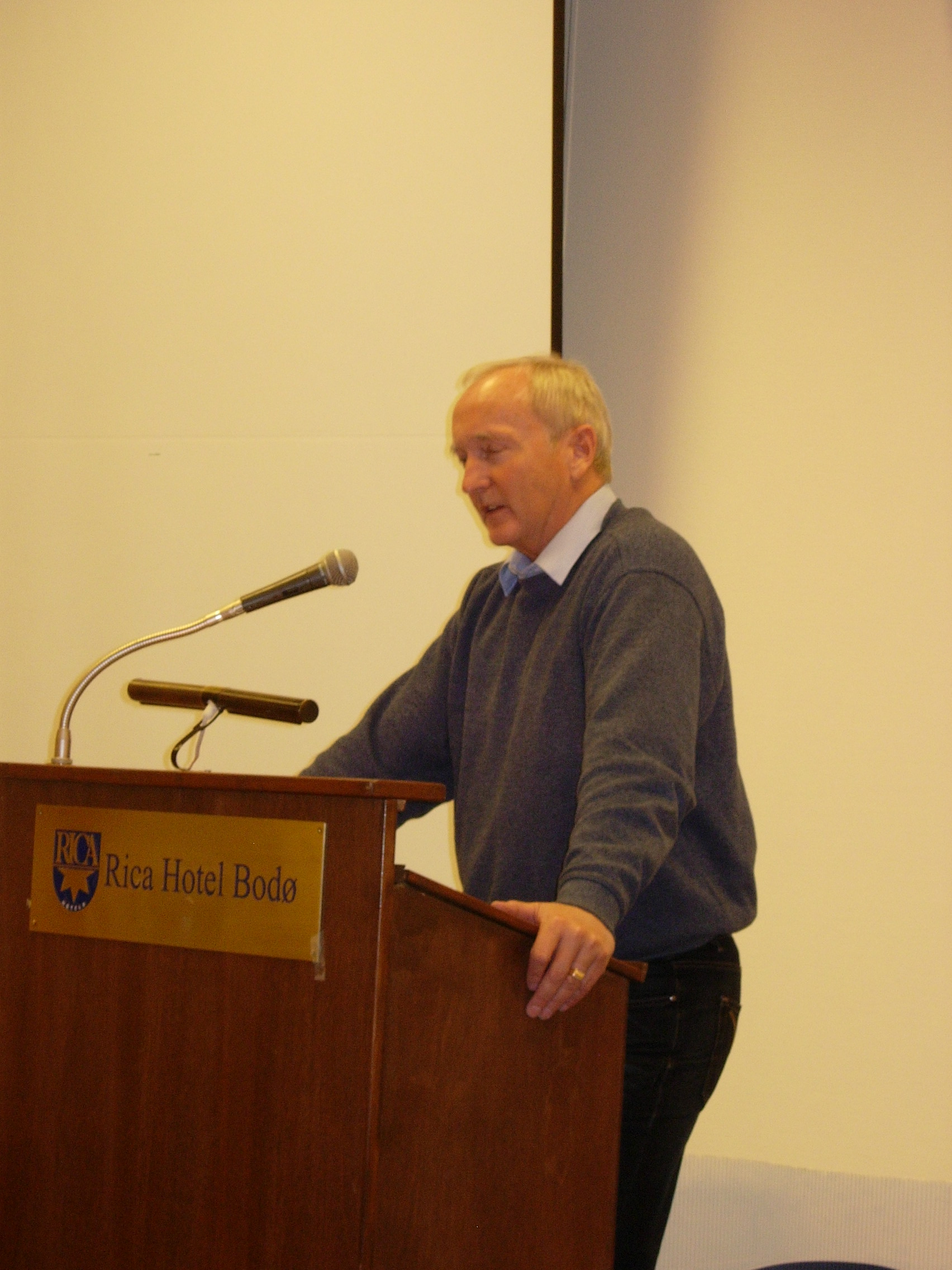
Søren Fredrik Voie

Søren Fredrik Voie (born 20 March 1949, in Vestvågøy Municipality) is a Norwegian politician for the Conservative Party of Norway.

He was elected in 2001 to the Norwegian Parliament from Nordland, one of the three northernmost counties in Norway, but was not re-elected in 2005. He served as deputy representative during the terms 1997–2001 and 2005–2009.

On the local level, Voie was a member of the executive committee the municipal council of Vestvågøy Municipality during the term 1979–1983, and then served as mayor from 1983 to 1987. From 1987 to 1995, he was also involved in Nordland county council. He was a member of the Conservative Party central committee from 1998 to 2002.

Outside politics, Voie has had a diverse career. He started in the fishing industry, before being a high school teacher from 1976 to 1983, bank director in Sparebank1 Nord-Norge from 1988 to 1992, administrative chief officer (rådmann in Vestvågøy Municipality from 1992 to 1999 and director at the Nord-Trøndelag University College from 1999 to 2001.
