= Knutstad Chapel =

Church in Nordland, Norway

- Knutstad kapell
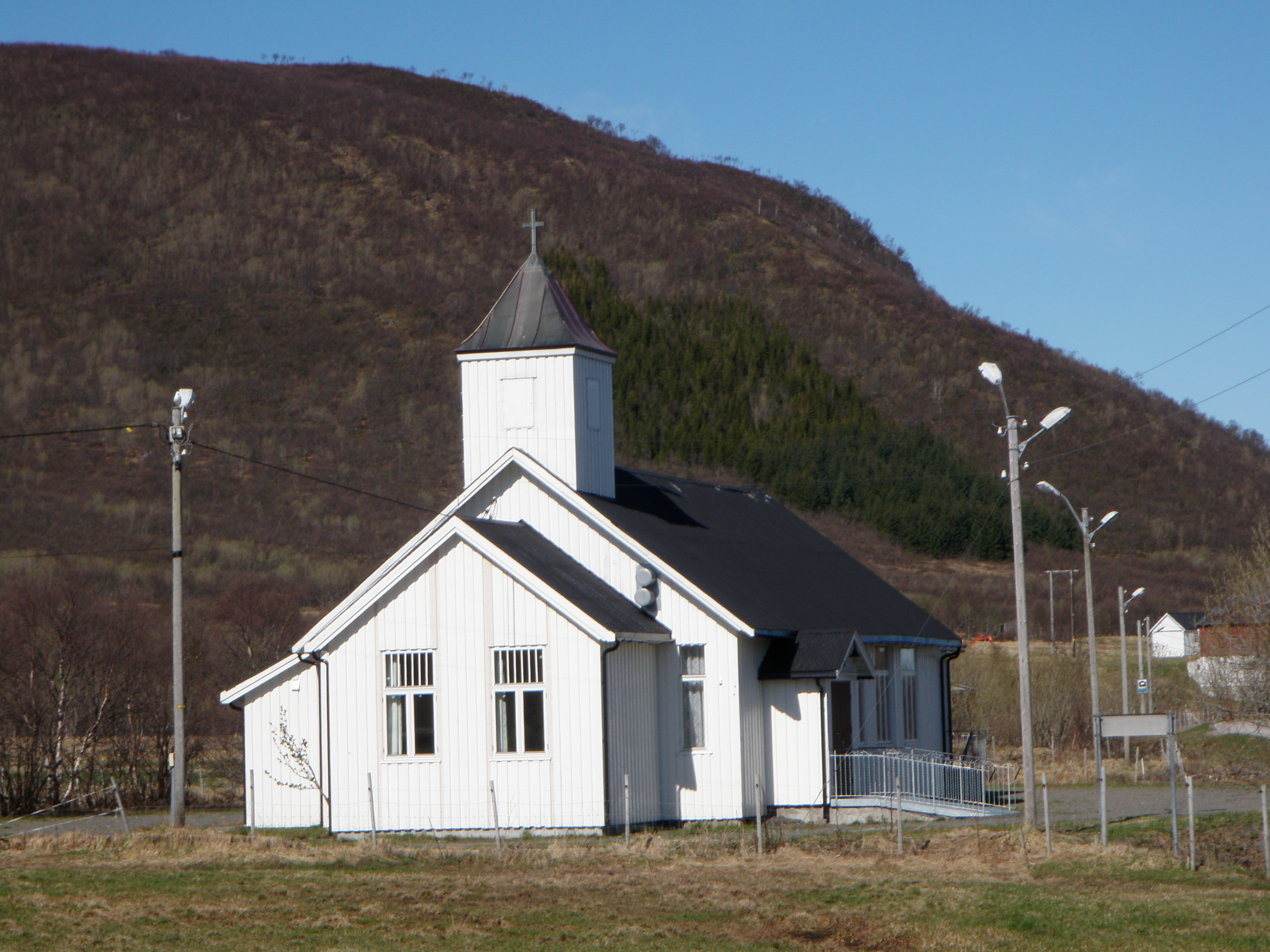
- View of the chapel
- Knutstad Chapel
- 68.27287618°N 13.9329225°E
- Location: Vestvågøy, Nordland
- Country: Norway
- Denomination: Church of Norway
- Churchmanship: Evangelical Lutheran

History
- Status: Chapel
- Founded: 1915
- Consecrated: 30 January 1944

Architecture
- Functional status: Active
- Architectural type: Long church
- Completed: 1915 (111 years ago)

Specifications
- Capacity: 120
- Materials: Wood

Administration
- Diocese: Sør-Hålogaland
- Deanery: Lofoten prosti
- Parish: Borge
- Norwegian Cultural Heritage Site
- Type: Church
- Status: Not protected
- ID: 84800

Knutstad Chapel (Norwegian: Knutstad kapell) is a chapel of the Church of Norway in Vestvågøy Municipality in Nordland county, Norway. It is located in the village of Knutstad on the island of Vestvågøya. It is an annex chapel in the Borge parish which is part of the Lofoten prosti (deanery) in the Diocese of Sør-Hålogaland. The white, wooden chapel was built in a long church style in 1915. The chapel seats about 120 people.

== History ==
The chapel was built in 1915 and used as a bedehus (meeting/prayer house). In November 1941, the local priest made plans to upgrade the building to that of a full annex chapel. No major changes were carried out except for the addition of an altar. On 30 January 1944, the new chapel was officially consecrated for use by the local provost Skjeseth. In 1947, a church bell was purchased and installed. In 1948 a choir and sacristy were added as well.

== Media gallery ==
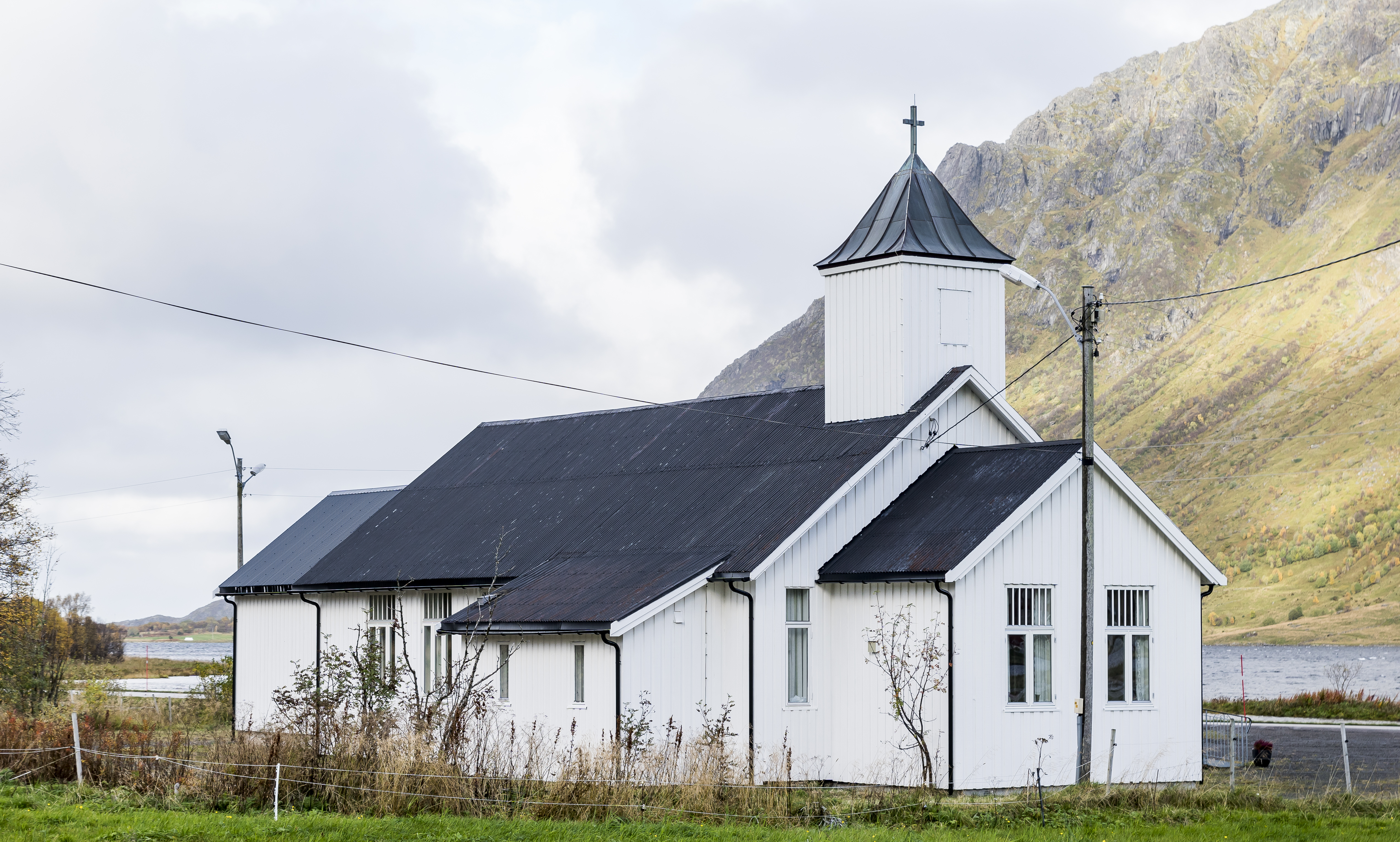

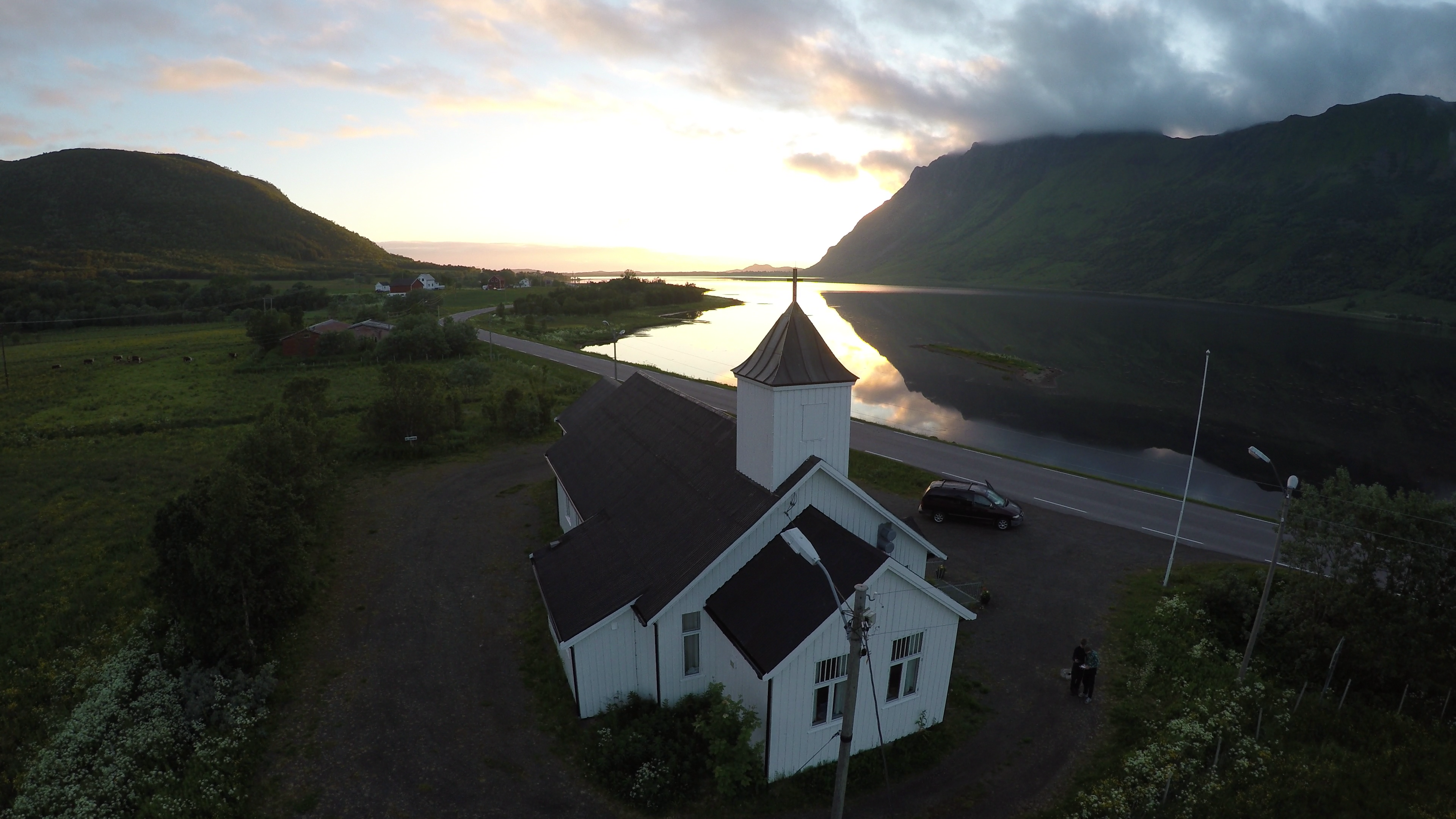

== See also ==
- List of churches in Sør-Hålogaland
