= Bøstad =

Village in Vestvågøy Municipality, Norway

- Village
- Interactive map of Bøstad
- Location within Nordland Location within Norway
- Coordinates: 68.2518°N 13.7687°E
- Country: Norway
- Region: Northern Norway
- County: Nordland
- District: Lofoten
- Municipality: Vestvågøy Municipality
- Elevation: 19 m (62 ft)
- Time zone: UTC+01:00 (CET)
  - Summer (DST): UTC+02:00 (CEST)
- Post Code: 8360 Bøstad

Bøstad is a village in Vestvågøy Municipality in Nordland county, Norway. It is located along the European route E10 highway just next to the hamlet of Borg (and the Lofotr museum) in the central part of the island of Vestvågøya in the Lofoten archipelago. Borge Church is located in Borg, very close to the village of Bøstad. Historically, this village was the administrative centre of the old Borge Municipality which existed from 1838 until 1963.
