= Borge Church =

Church in Nordland, Norway

- Borge kirke
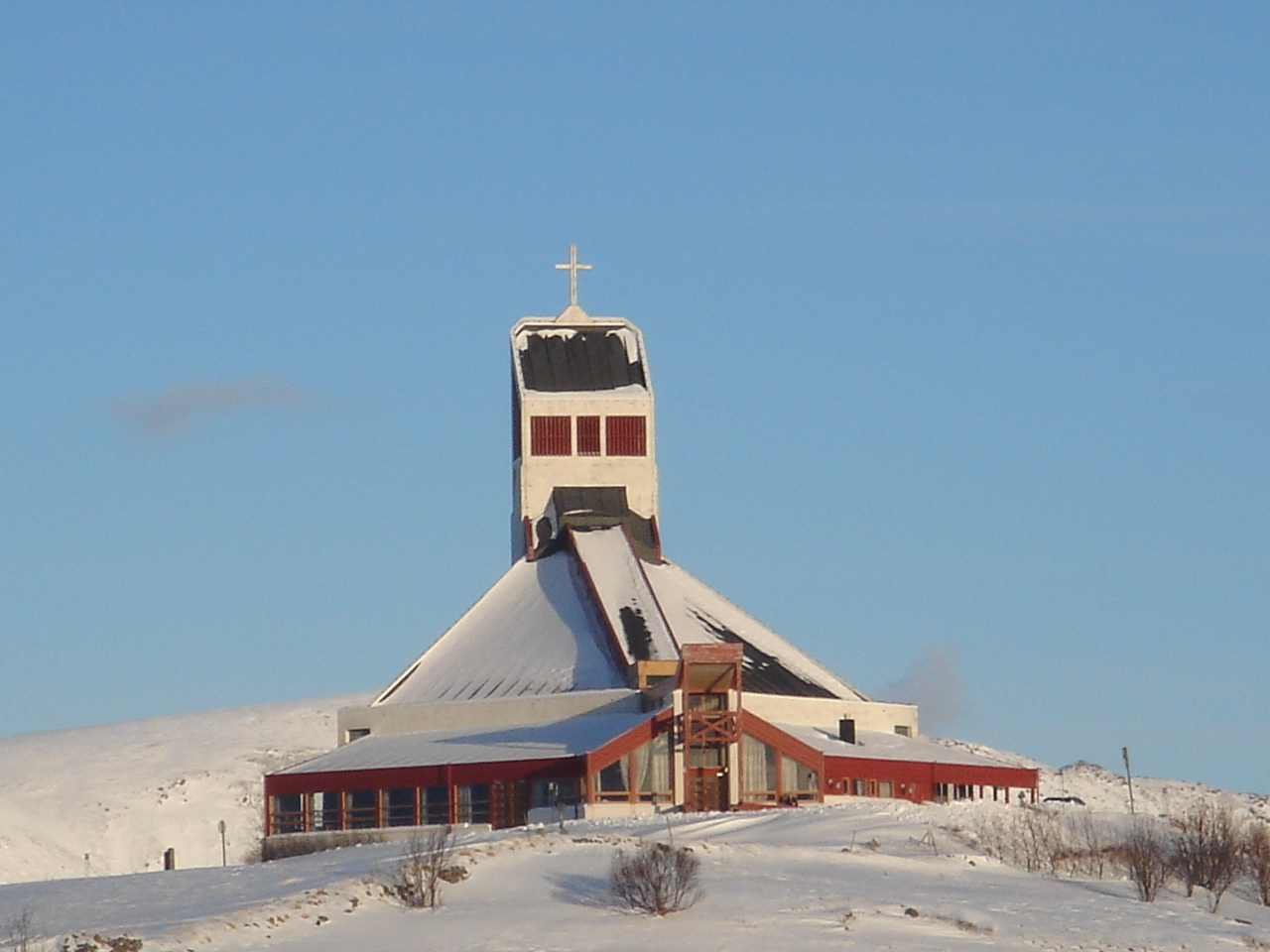
- View of the church
- Borge Church
- 68.24477386°N 13.7707596°E
- Location: Vestvågøy, Nordland
- Country: Norway
- Denomination: Church of Norway
- Churchmanship: Evangelical Lutheran

History
- Status: Parish church
- Founded: Before 1335
- Consecrated: 31 May 1987

Architecture
- Functional status: Active
- Architect: Knut Gjernes
- Architectural type: Fan-shaped
- Completed: 1987 (39 years ago)

Specifications
- Capacity: 600
- Materials: Concrete

Administration
- Diocese: Sør-Hålogaland
- Deanery: Lofoten prosti
- Parish: Borge
- Norwegian Cultural Heritage Site
- Type: Church
- Status: Not protected
- ID: 83928

Borge Church (Norwegian: Borge kirke) is a parish church of the Church of Norway in Vestvågøy Municipality in Nordland county, Norway. It is located just outside of the village of Bøstad on the island of Vestvågøya. It is the church for the Borge parish which is part of the Lofoten prosti (deanery) in the Diocese of Sør-Hålogaland. The red and white concrete church was built in a fan-shaped style in 1986 using plans drawn up by the architect Knut Gjernes. The church seats about 600 people. The building was consecrated on 31 May 1987.

== History ==
Borge Church is first mentioned in written sources in a document from 1335, but the church was not built that year. There likely have been six churches on this site over the centuries. The original church was located about 60 metres (200 ft) northwest of the present church site. By the mid-1600s, the old medieval church had fallen into disrepair and in 1659 it was torn down. A new cruciform log church was built to replace it on the same site. It was repaired extensively in 1702, but by 1725 it was described as being dilapidated and in poor condition. It was torn down and replaced in 1730. This new church was a timber-framed long church with a cross-arm extension on the north side and a sacristy on the south side along the chancel. About 40 years later, a southern cross-arm was added, giving the building a cruciform design. In 1797, the old church was torn down and construction on a new church on the same site began. During the construction in 1798, a large storm hit and knocked down the partially built church, so the construction had to start over. Around 1800, the new church was finally completed. It was a cruciform design, just like its predecessor.

In 1814, this church served as an election church (Norwegian: valgkirke). Together with more than 300 other parish churches across Norway, it was a polling station for elections to the 1814 Norwegian Constituent Assembly which wrote the Constitution of Norway. This was Norway's first national elections. Each church parish was a constituency that elected people called "electors" who later met together in each county to elect the representatives for the assembly that was to meet at Eidsvoll Manor later that year.

In 1877, the church underwent a renovation. In 1896, the church was struck by lightning and burned to the ground. Soon afterwards, construction on a new church began. The new building was designed by the architect H. Jürgensen. It was a large wooden long church with small, pointed towers over both the nave and chancel and room for 800 people. The new building was consecrated in 1898. On 14 February 1983 during a large winter storm, the church caught fire and burned down. It was then decided to move the church location about 60 metres (200 ft) to the southeast of the previous church site. The new church was completed in 1987 and consecrated on 31 May 1987.

== Media gallery ==
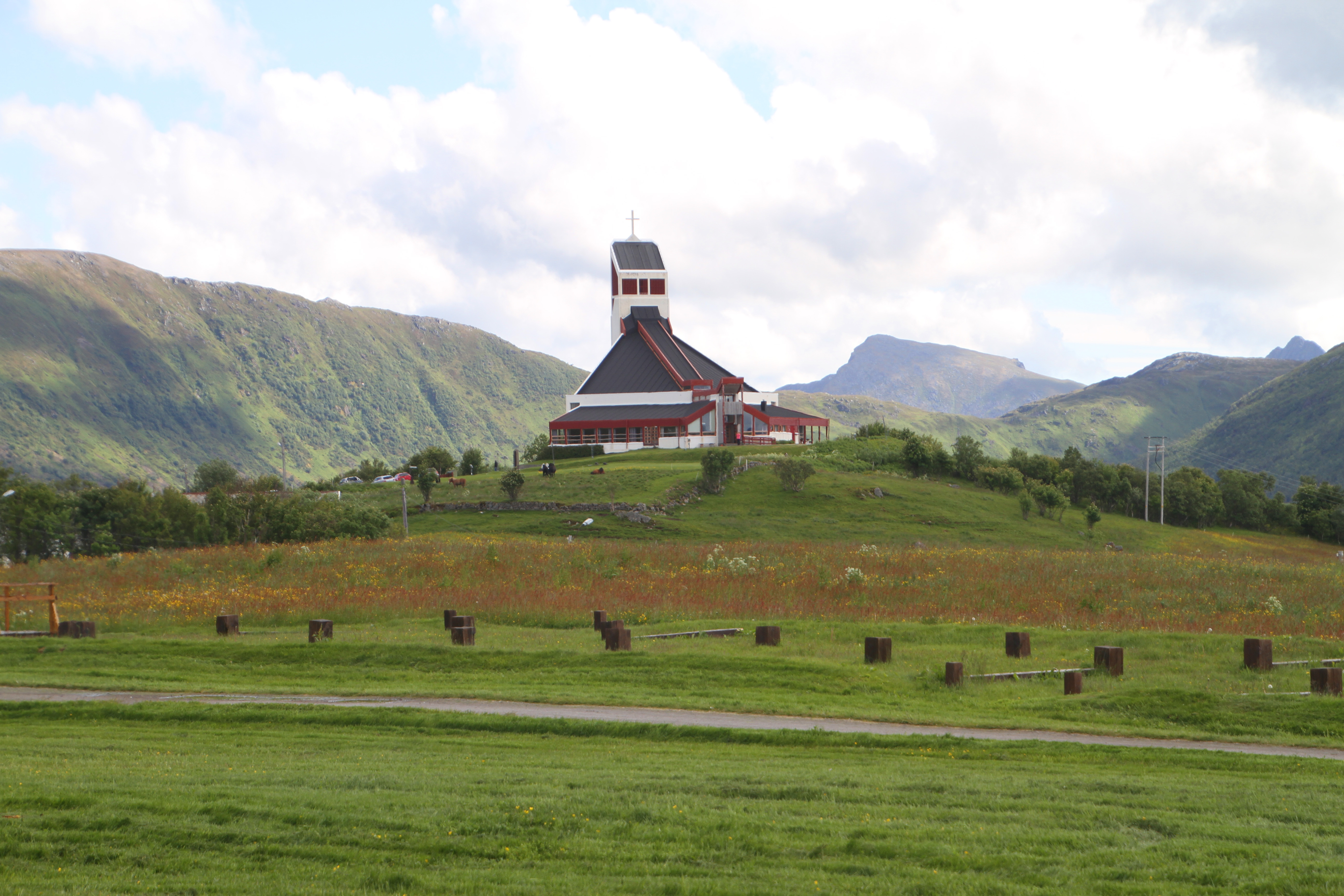
Seen from Lofotr Vikingmuseum

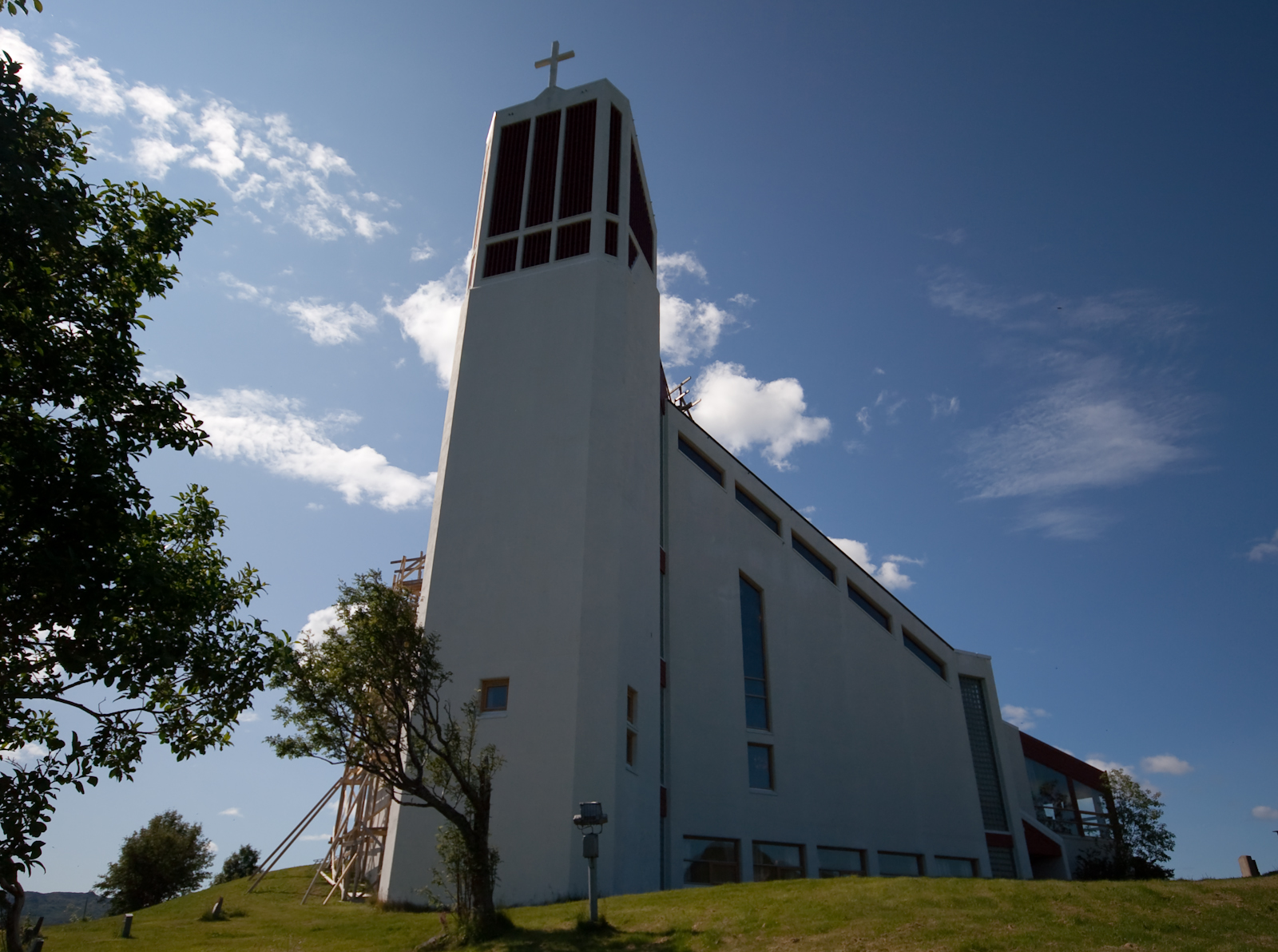

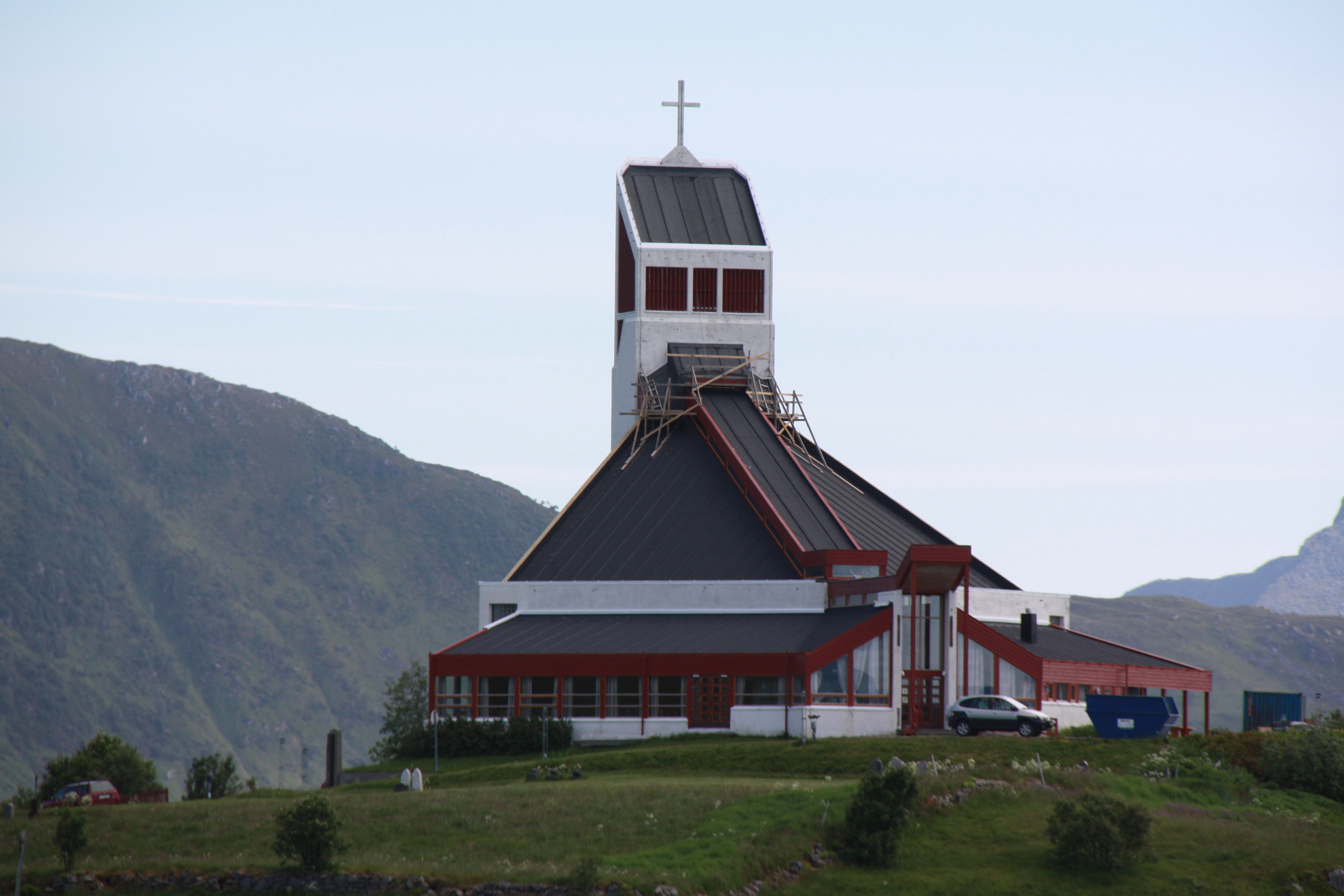

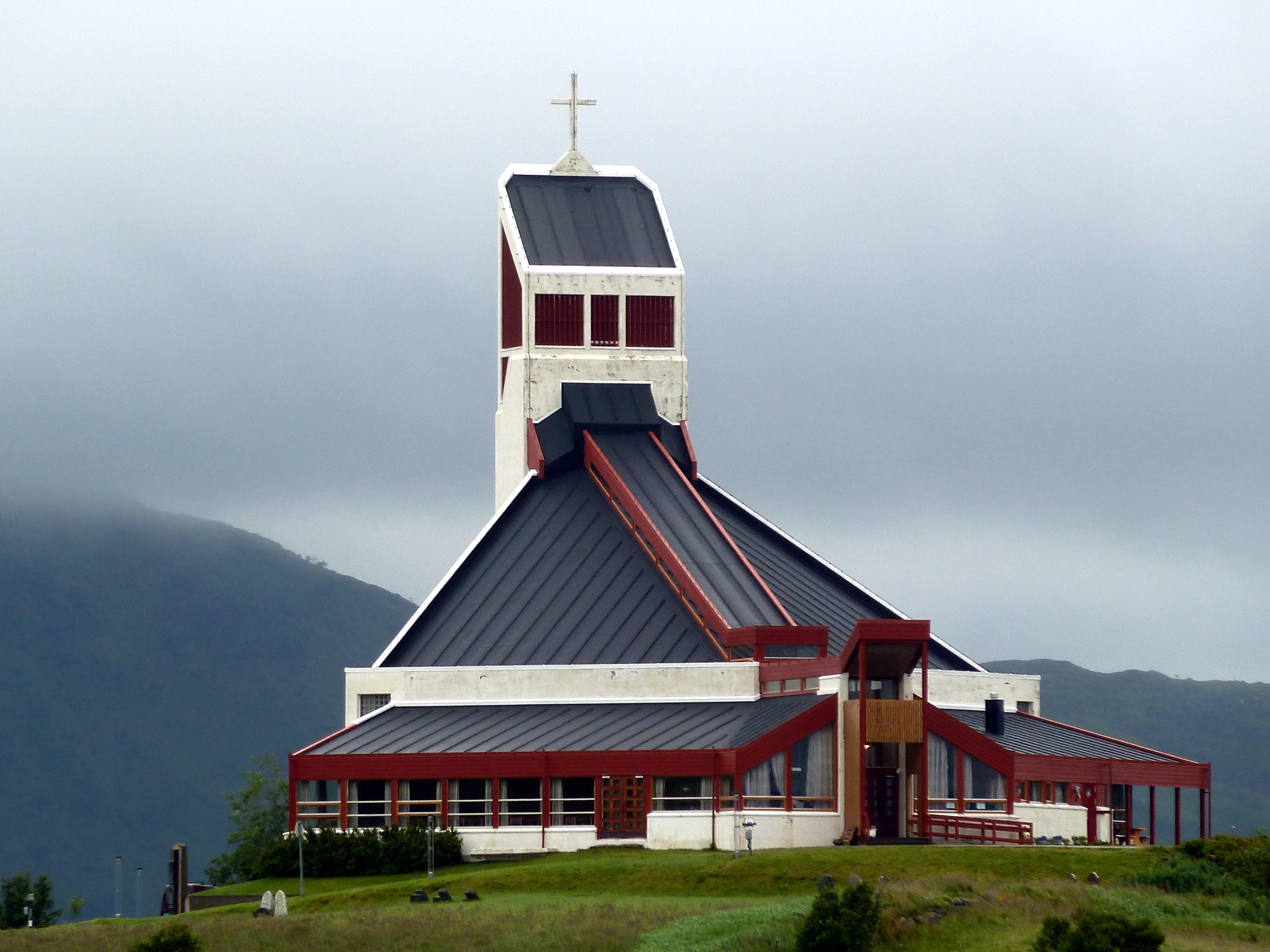

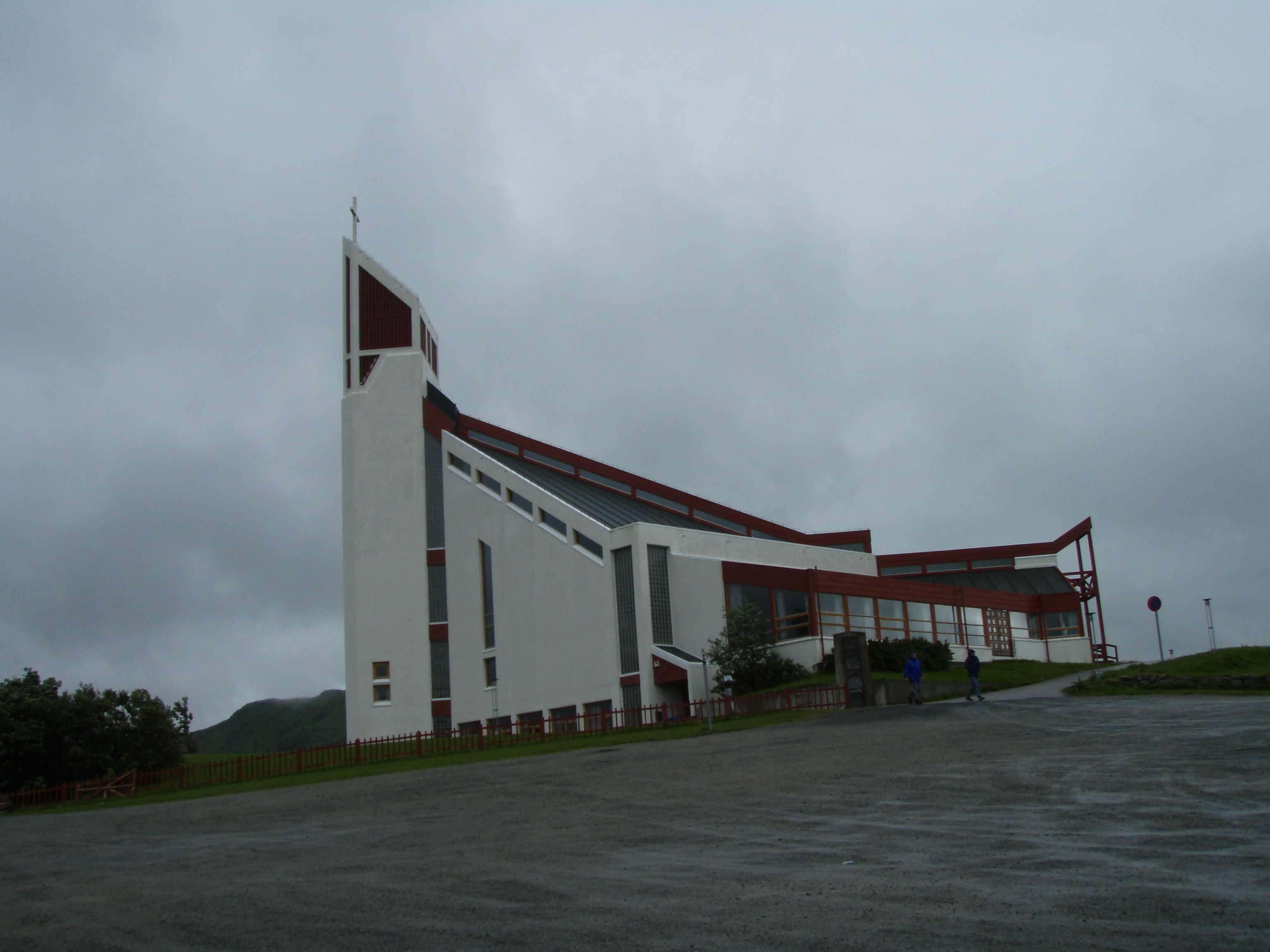

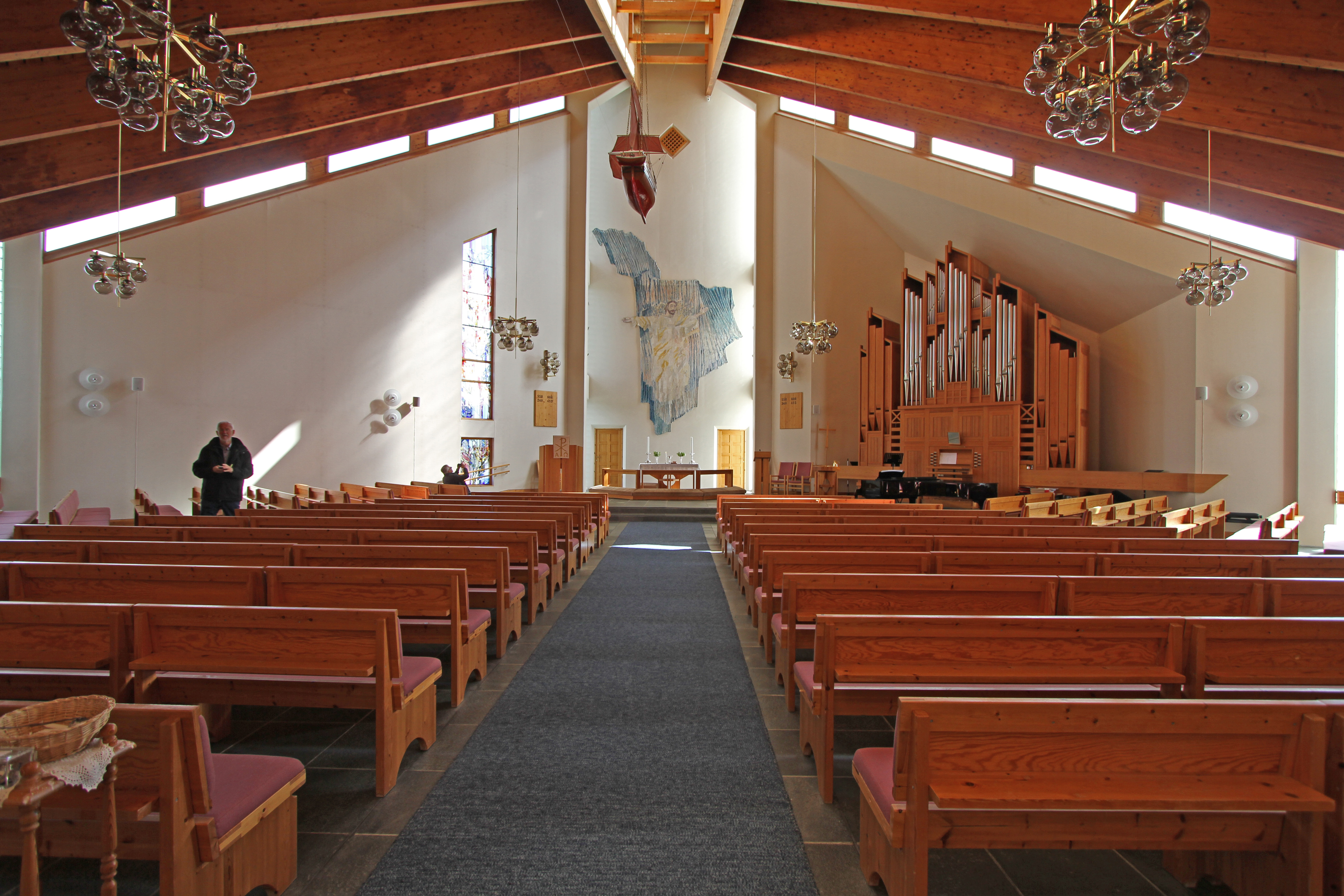
Interior

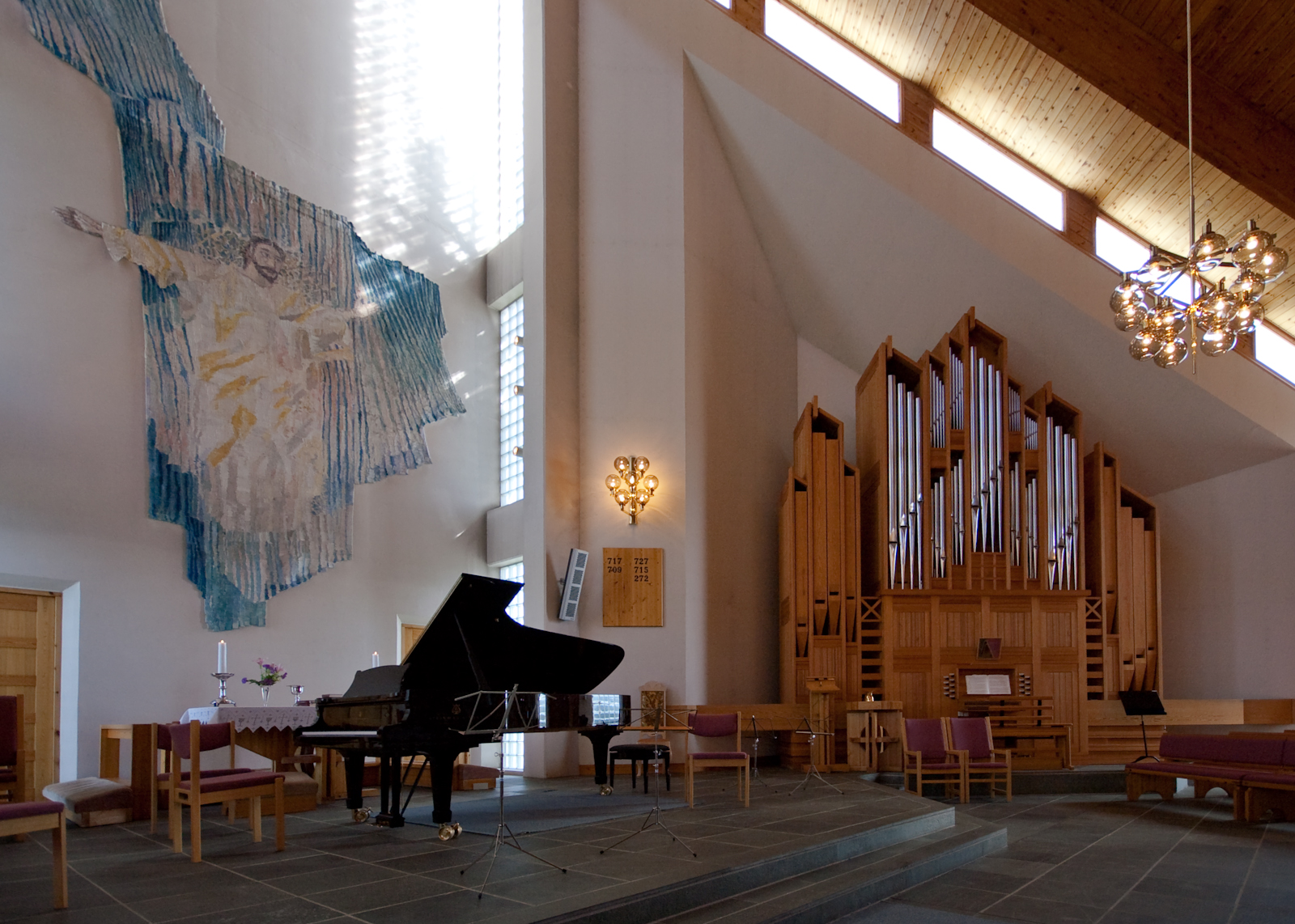
Altar and organ

== See also ==
- List of churches in Sør-Hålogaland
