= Vestvågøya =

Island in Nordland, Norway

- Interactive map of Vestvågøya

Geography
- Location: Nordland, Norway
- Coordinates: 68.2114°N 13.5566°E
- Archipelago: Lofoten
- Area: 411 km^{2} (159 sq mi)
- Length: 37 km (23 mi)
- Width: 21 km (13 mi)
- Highest elevation: 964 m (3163 ft)
- Highest point: Himmeltindan

Administration
- Norway
- County: Nordland
- Municipality: Vestvågøy Municipality

Demographics
- Population: 10,670 (2016)
- Pop. density: 26/km^{2} (67/sq mi)

Vestvågøya (or less-commonly: Vest-Vågøy) is an island in the Lofoten archipelago in Nordland county, Norway. The island is located within Vestvågøy Municipality. The island lies between the islands of Austvågøya and Gimsøya to the northeast and Flakstadøya to the southwest. There are also several small islands and skerries surrounding the island. Vestvågøya makes up over 97% of the municipal area and about 99% of the inhabitants of the municipality live on the island. The European route E10 highway crosses the island connecting to Flakstadøya by the Nappstraum Tunnel and to Gimsøya by the Sundklakkstraumen Bridge.

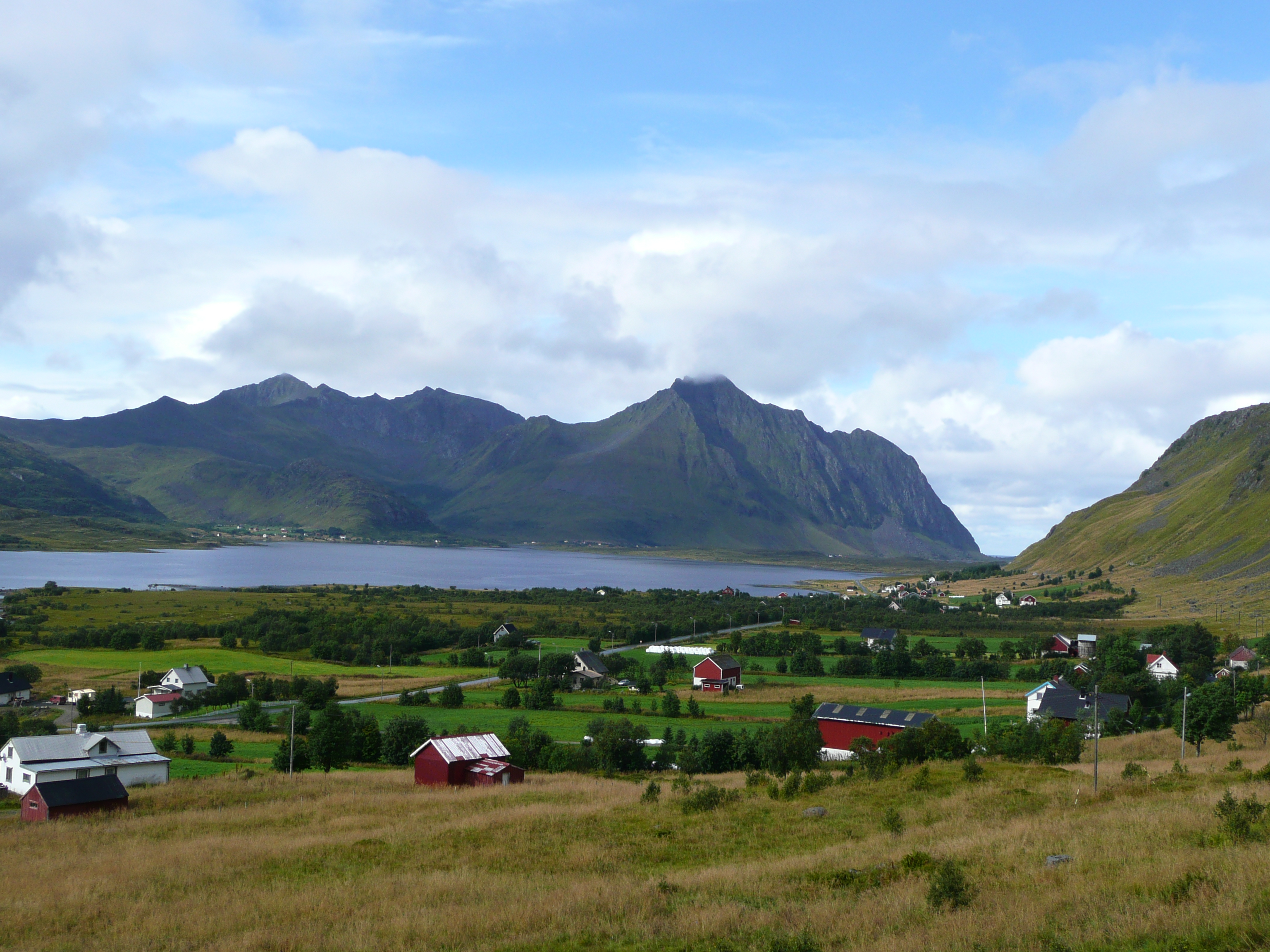
Eggum, northern part of the island

The middle part of the island is relatively flat and marshy, while the outer parts in the north and south are mountainous. The highest point on the island is the 964-metre (3,163 ft) tall mountain Himmeltindan. The flat parts of the island are largely agricultural land. There is one town on the island (Leknes) and several large villages on the island including Stamsund, Ballstad, and Gravdal.

In Vestvågøya mountains have steep slopes towards the open sea in the northwest and southeast while slopes pointing towards the interior of the island are more gentle. This is the result of erosion acting on a landscape that has been uplifted along southwest-northwest-trending faults in the margins of Lofoten while the interior axis has remained more stable.

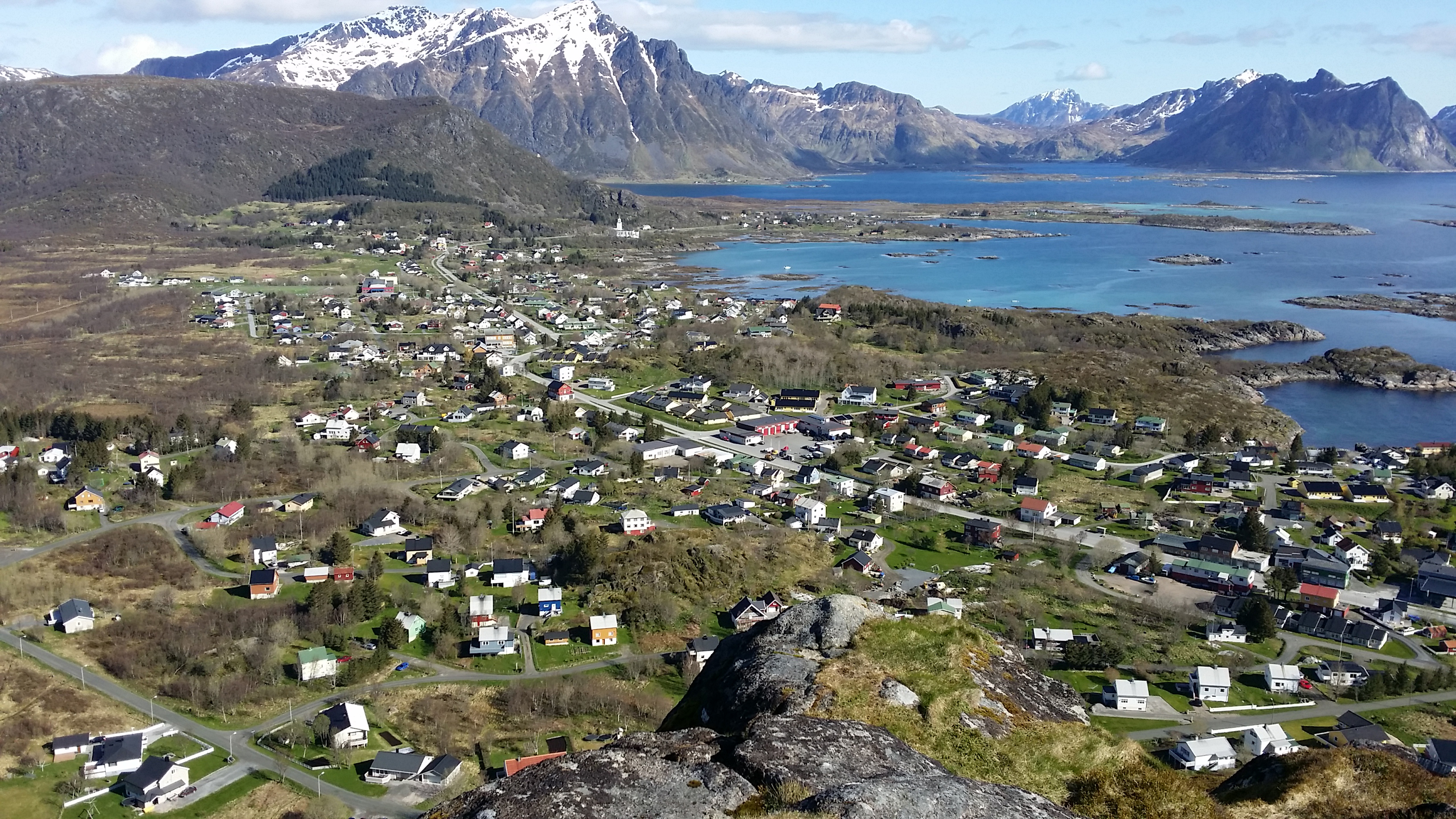
Stamsund in May

== See also ==
- List of islands of Norway
