= Valberg =

Valberg may refer to:

== People ==
- Birgitta Valberg (1916–2014), Swedish actress
- J.J. Valberg (1936), British-American philosopher
- Michelle Valberg, Canadian nature and wildlife photographer
- Robert Valberg (1884–1955), Austrian stage and film actor

== Places ==
- Valberg (ski resort), a purpose-built ski station in Provence-Alpes-Côte d'Azur, France
- Valberg Municipality, a former municipality in the Lofoten district of Nordland county, Norway
- Valberg, Nordland, a village in Vestvågøy Municipality in Nordland county, Norway
- Valberg Church, a church in Vestvågøy Municipality in Nordland county, Norway
- Valberg, Vestfold, a village in Sandefjord Municipality in Vestfold county, Norway

== See also ==
- Vålberg, a village in Karlstad Municipality, Värmland County, Sweden
