= Buksnes Municipality =

Former municipality in Nordland, Norway

Buksnes Municipality Buksnes herred
- Former municipality
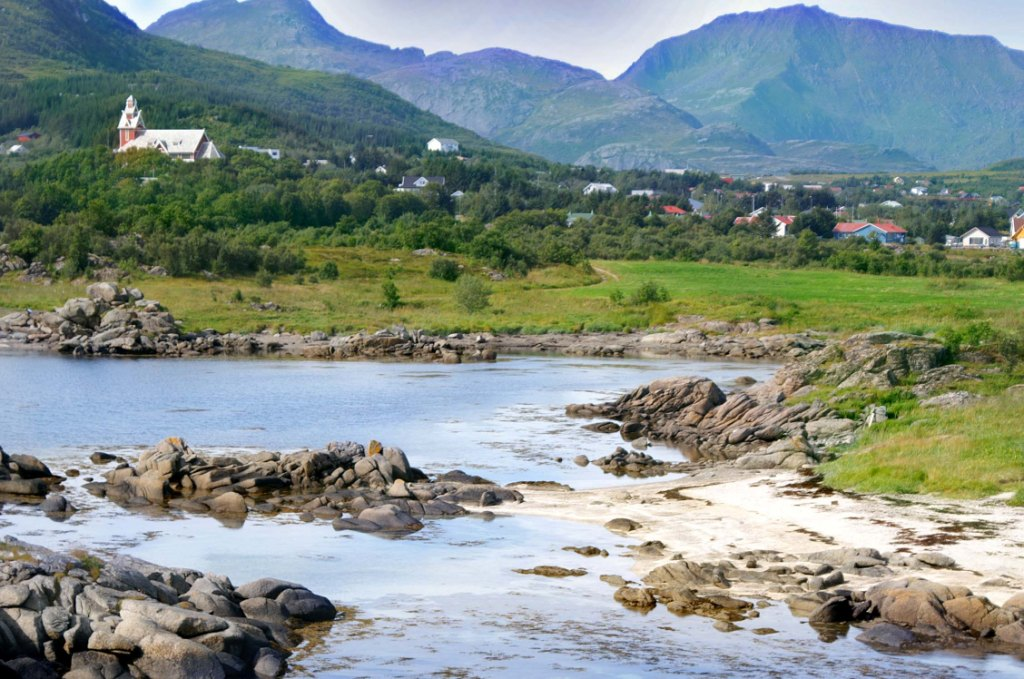
- View of Gravdal and surrounding area

- Nordland within Norway

- Buksnes within Nordland
- Coordinates: 68°07′01″N 13°33′37″E
- Country: Norway
- County: Nordland
- District: Lofoten
- Established: 1 Jan 1838
  - Created as: Formannskapsdistrikt
- Disestablished: 1 Jan 1963
  - Succeeded by: Vestvågøy Municipality
- Administrative centre: Gravdal

Government
  - Mayor (1956-1962): Alsing Wik (H)

Area (upon dissolution)
  - Total: 103.9 km^{2} (40.1 sq mi)
  - Rank: #521 in Norway
- Highest elevation: 955.91 m (3,136.2 ft)

Population (1962)
  - Total: 4,373
  - Rank: #197 in Norway
  - Density: 42.1/km^{2} (109/sq mi)
  - Change (10 years): ▼ −5.5%
- Demonym: Buksnesfolk

Official language
  - Norwegian form: Bokmål
- Time zone: UTC+01:00 (CET)
  - Summer (DST): UTC+02:00 (CEST)
- ISO 3166 code: NO-1860

Buksnes is a former municipality in Nordland county, Norway. The 104-square-kilometre (40 sq mi) municipality existed from 1838 until its dissolution in 1963. It comprised the western part of the island of Vestvågøya in what is now Vestvågøy Municipality. The administrative centre was located in the village of Gravdal where the main church for the municipality, Buksnes Church, is located. Other villages in Buksnes included Ballstad and Leknes.

Prior to its dissolution in 1963, the 104-square-kilometre (40 sq mi) municipality was the 521st largest by area out of the 705 municipalities in Norway. Buksnes Municipality was the 197th most populous municipality in Norway with a population of about 4,373. The municipality's population density was 42.1 inhabitants per square kilometre (109/sq mi) and its population had decreased by 5.5% over the previous 10-year period.

== General information ==
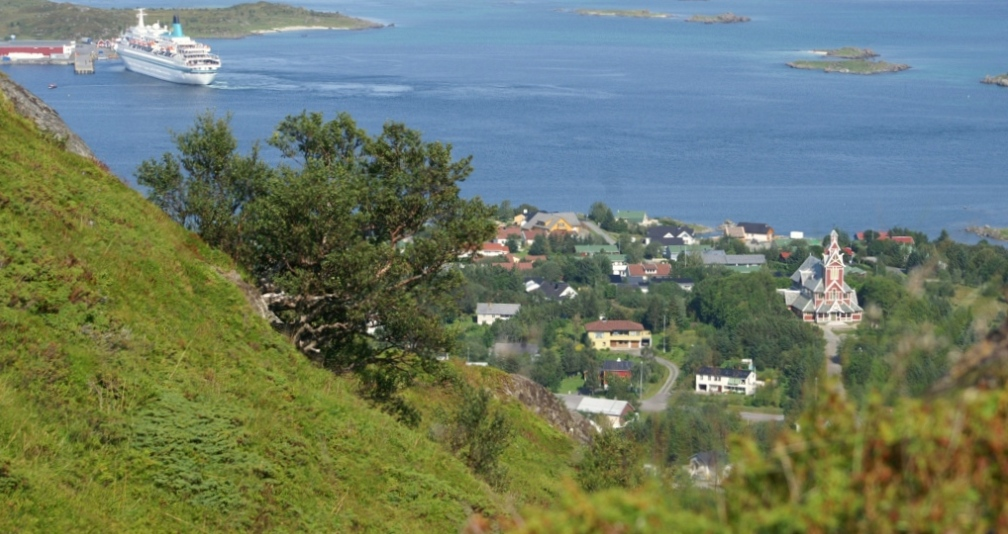
View of Gravdal

The municipality of Buksnes was established on 1 January 1838 (see formannskapsdistrikt law). On 1 July 1919, the southeastern district of Buksnes Municipality (population: 2,272) was separated from it to create the new Hol Municipality. The split left Buksnes Municipality with 3,188 inhabitants. During the 1960s, there were many municipal mergers across Norway due to the work of the Schei Committee. On 1 January 1963, Buksnes Municipality (population: 4,416) was merged with the neighboring Borge Municipality (population: 4,056), Hol Municipality (population: 3,154), and Valberg Municipality (population: 662) to create the new Vestvågøy Municipality.

=== Name ===
The municipality (originally the parish) is named after the old Buksnes farm (historically: Buxnnæs) since the first Buksnes Church was built there. The meaning of the name is uncertain, but the first element may be derived from buks which means "sign" or "mark", possibly referring to a sea mark. The last element is nes which means "headland".

=== Churches ===
The Church of Norway had one parish (sokn) within Buksnes Municipality. At the time of the municipal dissolution, it was part of the Buksnes prestegjeld and the Lofoten prosti (deanery) in the Diocese of Sør-Hålogaland.

Churches in Buksnes Municipality
Parish (sokn)	Church name	Location of the church	Year built
Buksnes	Buksnes Church	Gravdal	1905

== Geography ==
The municipality was located on the western part of the large island of Vestvågøya. Borge Municipality was located to the northeast, Valberg Municipality was to the east, Hol Municipality was located to the south, and Flakstad Municipality was located to the west (on the island of Flakstadøya). The highest point in Buksnes Municipality is the 955.9-metre (3,136 ft) tall mountain Himmeltindan, which was located on the border with neighboring Borge Municipality.

== Government ==
While it existed, Buksnes Municipality was responsible for primary education (through 10th grade), outpatient health services, senior citizen services, welfare and other social services, zoning, economic development, and municipal roads and utilities. The municipality was governed by a municipal council of directly elected representatives. The mayor was indirectly elected by a vote of the municipal council. The municipality was under the jurisdiction of the Hålogaland Court of Appeal.

=== Municipal council ===
The municipal council (Herredsstyre) of Buksnes Municipality was made up of 21 representatives that were elected to four year terms. The tables below show the historical composition of the council by political party.

Buksnes herredsstyre 1959–1963
Party name (in Norwegian)	Number of representatives
Labour Party (Arbeiderpartiet)	8
Conservative Party (Høyre)	5
Christian Democratic Party (Kristelig Folkeparti)	2
Centre Party (Senterpartiet)	4
Liberal Party (Venstre)	2
Total number of members:	21
Note: On 1 January 1963, Buksnes Municipality became part of Vestvågøy Municipality.

Buksnes herredsstyre 1955–1959
Party name (in Norwegian)	Number of representatives
Labour Party (Arbeiderpartiet)	7
Liberal Party (Venstre)	3
Joint List(s) of Non-Socialist Parties (Borgerlige Felleslister)	9
Local List(s) (Lokale lister)	2
Total number of members:	21

Buksnes herredsstyre 1951–1955
Party name (in Norwegian)	Number of representatives
Labour Party (Arbeiderpartiet)	10
Christian Democratic Party (Kristelig Folkeparti)	1
Liberal Party (Venstre)	3
Joint List(s) of Non-Socialist Parties (Borgerlige Felleslister)	7
Total number of members:	21

Buksnes herredsstyre 1947–1951
Party name (in Norwegian)	Number of representatives
Labour Party (Arbeiderpartiet)	8
Christian Democratic Party (Kristelig Folkeparti)	1
Liberal Party (Venstre)	3
Joint List(s) of Non-Socialist Parties (Borgerlige Felleslister)	9
Total number of members:	21

Buksnes herredsstyre 1945–1947
Party name (in Norwegian)	Number of representatives
Labour Party (Arbeiderpartiet)	10
Christian Democratic Party (Kristelig Folkeparti)	2
Farmers' Party (Bondepartiet)	1
Liberal Party (Venstre)	2
Joint List(s) of Non-Socialist Parties (Borgerlige Felleslister)	6
Total number of members:	21

Buksnes herredsstyre 1937–1941*
Party name (in Norwegian)	Number of representatives
Labour Party (Arbeiderpartiet)	6
Joint List(s) of Non-Socialist Parties (Borgerlige Felleslister)	10
Total number of members:	16
Note: Due to the German occupation of Norway during World War II, no elections were held for new municipal councils until after the war ended in 1945.

=== Mayors ===
The mayor (Norwegian: ordfører) of Buksnes Municipality was the political leader of the municipality and the chairperson of the municipal council. Here is a list of people who have held this position:

- 1838–1839: Rev. Andreas Daae
- 1840–1843: Caspar Westerwaldt
- 1844–1844: Rev. Andreas Daae
- 1845–1854: Unknown
- 1854–1854: Nils Andreas Schøning
- 1855–1859: Unknown
- 1860–1860: Johan Dybfest Iversen
- 1861–1866: Johan Rist
- 1866–1870: Nils Andreas Schøning
- 1870–1871: Johan Rist
- 1871–1872: Kristian T. Stillesen
- 1873–1874: Peter E. Jentoft
- 1875–1880: Jacob L. Jentoft
- 1881–1884: Johan Larsen Storfjord
- 1885–1886: Johan Rist
- 1886–1888: Petter L. Wulff
- 1889–1890: Mathias Salomonsen
- 1890–1890: Petter L. Wulff
- 1891–1892: Fredrik W. Wulff
- 1893–1894: Mathias Salomonsen Leknes
- 1895–1896: Fredrik W. Wulff
- 1896–1896: Jørgen Pedersen Ballstad
- 1897–1897: Mathias Salomonsen Leknes
- 1898–1900: Jørgen Pedersen Ballstad
- 1901–1904: Heitman Hansen
- 1905–1911: S.L. Aasen
- 1912–1914: Ingvald Johansen Myklevik
- 1915–1916: S.L. Aasen
- 1917–1919: Andreas Tetlie
- 1919–1919: Mathias Salomonsen Leknes
- 1920–1926: S.L. Aasen
- 1926–1932: Oluf Svendsen Haug
- 1933–1934: P.A. Pedersen Ballstad
- 1935–1937: Jens Finstad
- 1938–1941: P.A. Pedersen Ballstad
- 1941–1941: B. Fiksdal
- 1942–1943: Harald Leknes
- 1943–1945: J. Seljeseth
- 1945–1945: Schj. Salomonsen
- 1945–1945: P.A. Pedersen Ballstad
- 1946–1951: Rolf Jentoft Ballstad (V)
- 1952–1955: Børge Fiksdal (Ap)
- 1956–1962: Alsing Wik (H)

== Notable people ==
- Leonhard Christian Borchgrevink Holmboe (1802-1887), a Lutheran clergymen who was the vicar in Buksnes
- Arnold Carl Johansen (1898–1957), a member of the Norwegian Parliament from Nordland
- Gerhard Schøning (1722-1780), a historian
- Harald Sverdrup (1923–1992), a poet and children's writer

== See also ==
- List of former municipalities of Norway
