= Arnold Carl Johansen =

Norwegian politician

Arnold Carl Johansen (19 February 1898 – 29 July 1957) was a Norwegian politician for the Conservative Party.

He was born in Buksnes Municipality.

He was elected to the Norwegian Parliament from Nordland in 1950, but was not re-elected in 1954.

Johansen was a member of the municipal council of Hol Municipality from 1922 to 1950.
