= Hol Church (Nordland) =

Church in Nordland, Norway

- Hol kirke
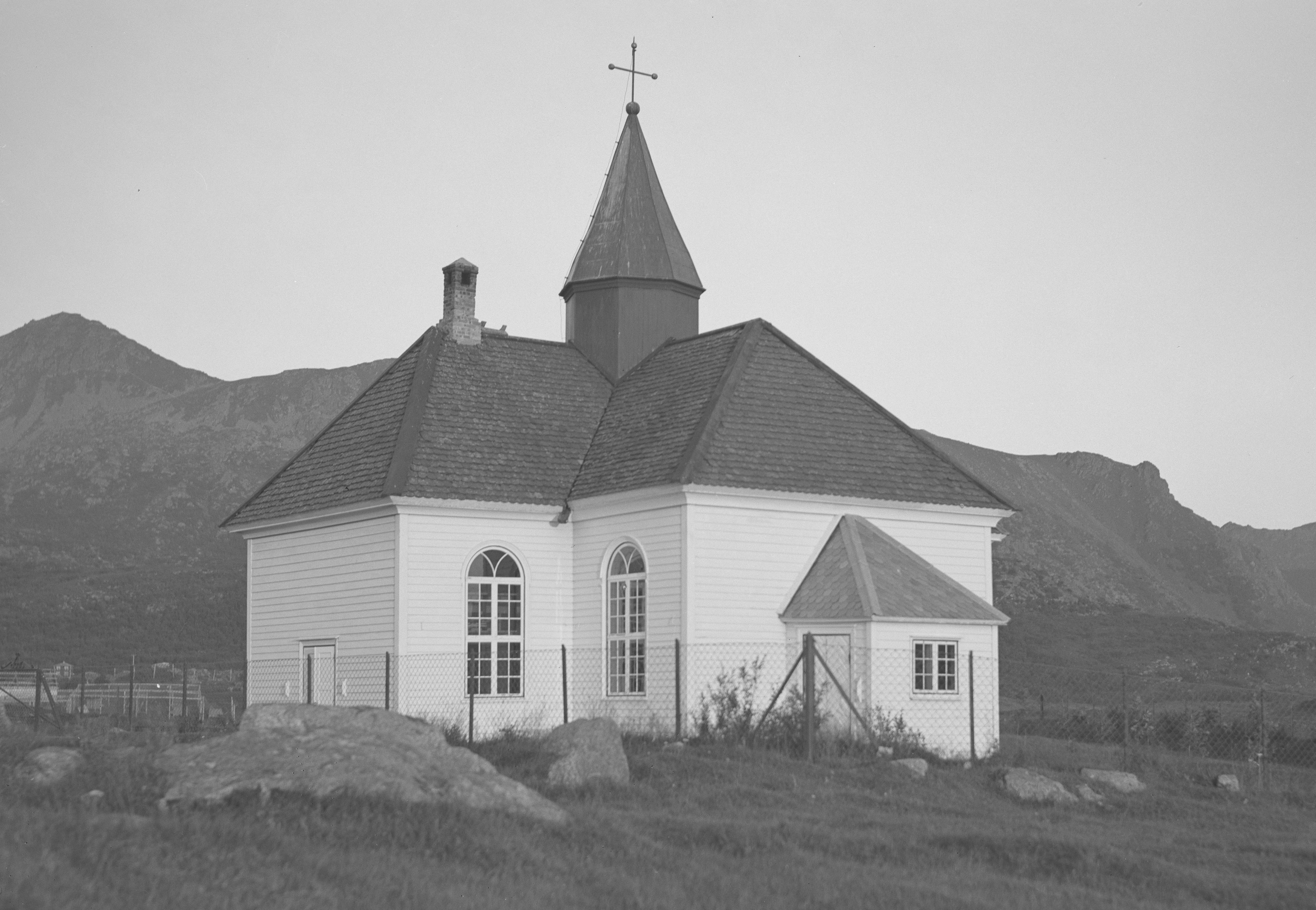
- View of the church
- Hol Church
- 68.13873080°N 13.64217236°E
- Location: Vestvågøy, Nordland
- Country: Norway
- Denomination: Church of Norway
- Churchmanship: Evangelical Lutheran

History
- Status: Parish church
- Founded: 14th century
- Consecrated: 1806

Architecture
- Functional status: Active
- Architectural type: Cruciform
- Completed: 1806 (220 years ago)

Specifications
- Capacity: 300
- Materials: Wood

Administration
- Diocese: Sør-Hålogaland
- Deanery: Lofoten prosti
- Parish: Hol
- Norwegian Cultural Heritage Site
- Type: Church
- Status: Listed
- ID: 84594

Hol Church (Norwegian: Hol kirke) is a parish church of the Church of Norway in Vestvågøy Municipality in Nordland county, Norway. It is located on the southeastern edge of the town of Leknes on the island of Vestvågøya. It is the church for the Hol parish which is part of the Lofoten prosti (deanery) in the Diocese of Sør-Hålogaland. The white, wooden church was built in a cruciform style in 1806 using plans drawn up by an unknown architect. The church seats about 300 people.

== History ==
Hol Church is the second oldest church in the island region of Lofoten, and it dates back to at least the mid-14th century. The earliest existing historical record of the church dates back to the year 1417, but the church was not new at that time. In 1666, the church was described as being in terrible condition. In 1725, the church was described as being in disrepair and in need of replacement. In 1734, the old church was torn down and a new church was rebuilt on the same site. The new church was a "long church" without a tower and it was approximately 17 by 7 metres (56 ft × 23 ft). The altarpiece is most likely the work of Gottfried Ezekiel (ca. 1719–1798). He arrived in Bergen from the Baltic Sea town of Königsberg in 1744, after he received a commission as a painter. By 1751, he arrived in northern Norway where he painted a number of altarpieces for local churches.

Over time the church deteriorated and was repaired. By 1804, the church was in such bad shape that it was completely rebuilt. Some of the old materials were re-used in the new church. The newly rebuilt church was finished in 1806 and this time it was a log building in a cruciform design and a hipped roof. Petter Svaboe from Vågan was the chief builder of the new church.

In 1814, this church served as an election church (Norwegian: valgkirke). Together with more than 300 other parish churches across Norway, it was a polling station for elections to the 1814 Norwegian Constituent Assembly which wrote the Constitution of Norway. This was Norway's first national elections. Each church parish was a constituency that elected people called "electors" who later met together in each county to elect the representatives for the assembly that was to meet at Eidsvoll Manor later that year.

The cemetery at Hol Church was closed in 1830 since it was full and people had to be buried at the nearby Buksnes Church. In 1859, the church underwent a major renovation and repair work. A new cemetery was opened at Petvik in 1905 and people from Hol Church have been buried there since that time.

== See also ==
- List of churches in Sør-Hålogaland
