= Gravdal, Nordland =

Village in Vestvågøy Municipality, Norway

Gravdal
- Village
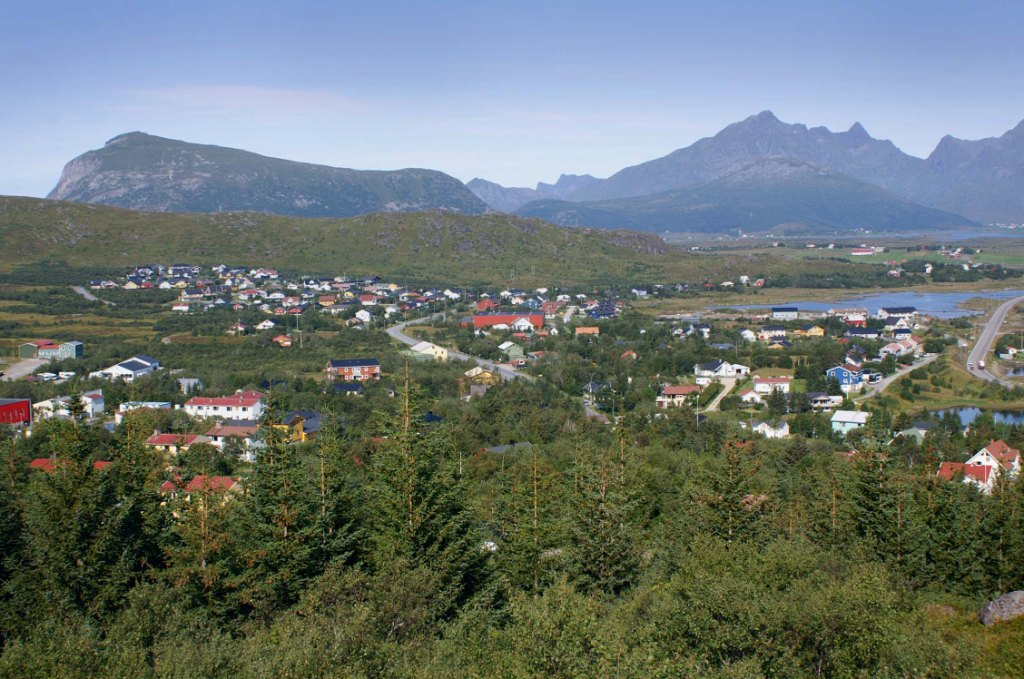
- View of the village
- Interactive map of Gravdal
- Location within Nordland Location within Norway
- Coordinates: 68.1183°N 13.5534°E
- Country: Norway
- Region: Northern Norway
- County: Nordland
- District: Lofoten
- Municipality: Vestvågøy Municipality

Area
  - Total: 1.27 km^{2} (0.49 sq mi)
- Elevation: 13 m (43 ft)

Population (2023)
  - Total: 1,662
  - Density: 1,309/km^{2} (3,390/sq mi)
- Time zone: UTC+01:00 (CET)
  - Summer (DST): UTC+02:00 (CEST)
- Post Code: 8372 Gravdal

Gravdal is a village in Vestvågøy Municipality in Nordland county, Norway. It is located on the island of Vestvågøya in the central part of the Lofoten archipelago, north of the Arctic Circle. The village is situated along the shore of the Buksnesfjorden, about 3 kilometres (1.9 mi) southwest of the town of Leknes. The village also lies approximately 72 kilometres (45 mi) west of the town of Svolvær and 63 kilometres (39 mi) east of the village of Å in Moskenes Municipality. Historically, the village was the administrative centre of the old Buksnes Municipality which existed from 1838 until 1963.

The 1.27-square-kilometre (310-acre) village has a population (2023) of 1,662 and a population density of 1,309 inhabitants per square kilometre (3,390/sq mi).

Gravdal has gone from being a small trade center on the island to becoming mostly a residential village. Today, there is a grocery store, kindergarten, primary school, and several small businesses. Nordland Hospital and the Nordland School of Fisheries are both located in Gravdal and have been major economic centers of Gravdal for a very long time, along with the Gravdal port. The more than 100-year-old Buksnes Church, which was built in 1905 in dragestil style, is located in the village.

== Culture & Arts ==
Gravdal Gangstaz is a rap group from Gravdal known for blending hip-hop with the traditions and dialect of Lofoten. Since their formation in 2002, they have created music that celebrates the region's coastal culture, capturing the spirit of island and fishing communities. Their most popular song, “Den store brennvinsdagen”, highlights the historic March 25th celebration tied to the Lofotfisket annual fishing season, reflecting the group’s mission to preserve and modernize local traditions.

== Media gallery ==
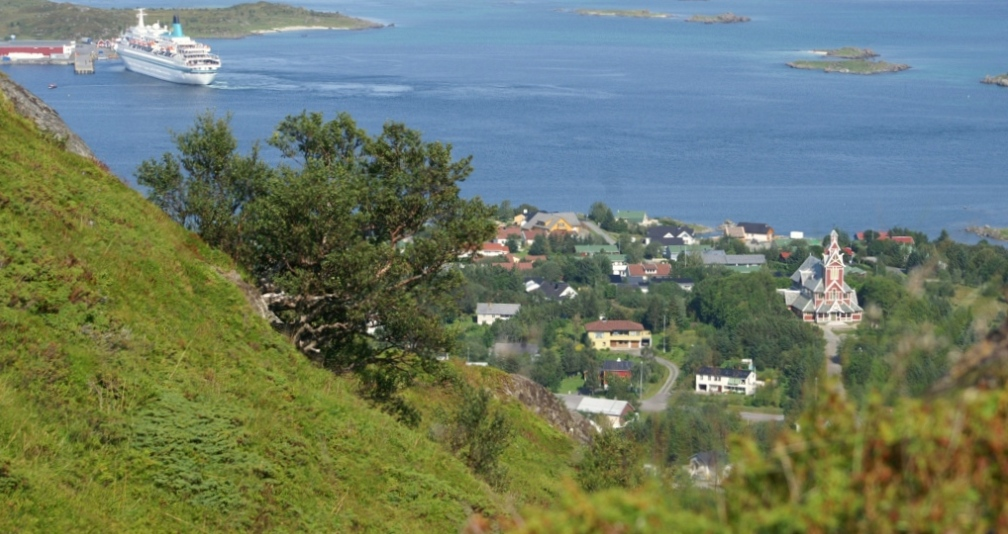
Gravdal—the gateway to Lofoten for international cruise liners

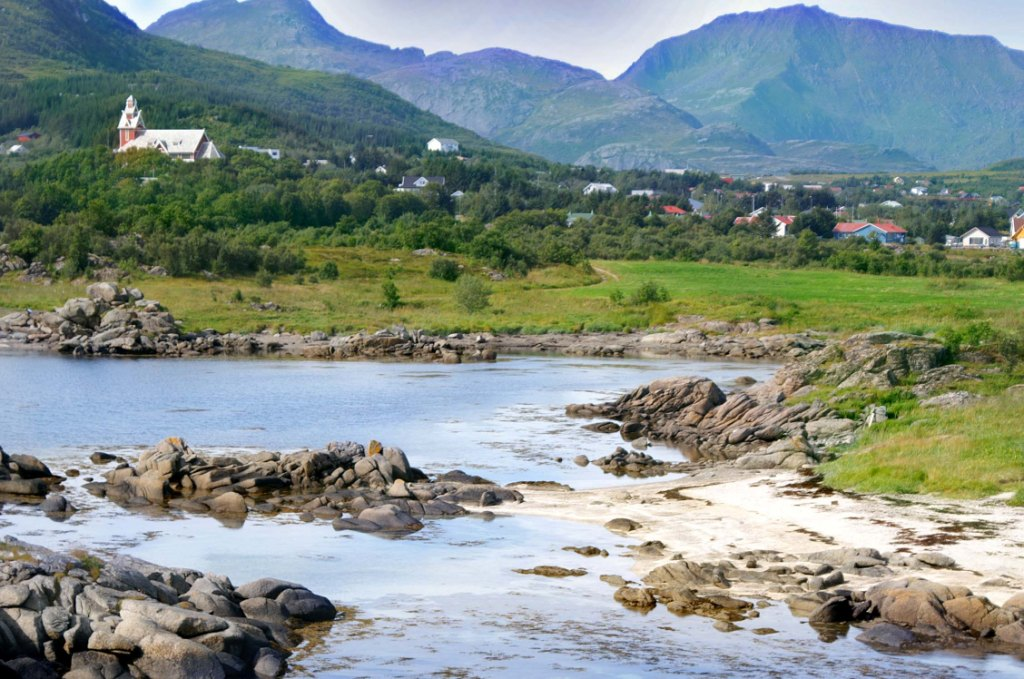
Gravdal from the beach

The light house of the Buksnes bay area in Gravdal

Main street "Gravdals gata" (northward view)

View of Gravdal from the bay

Gravdal Beach

Gravdal sign

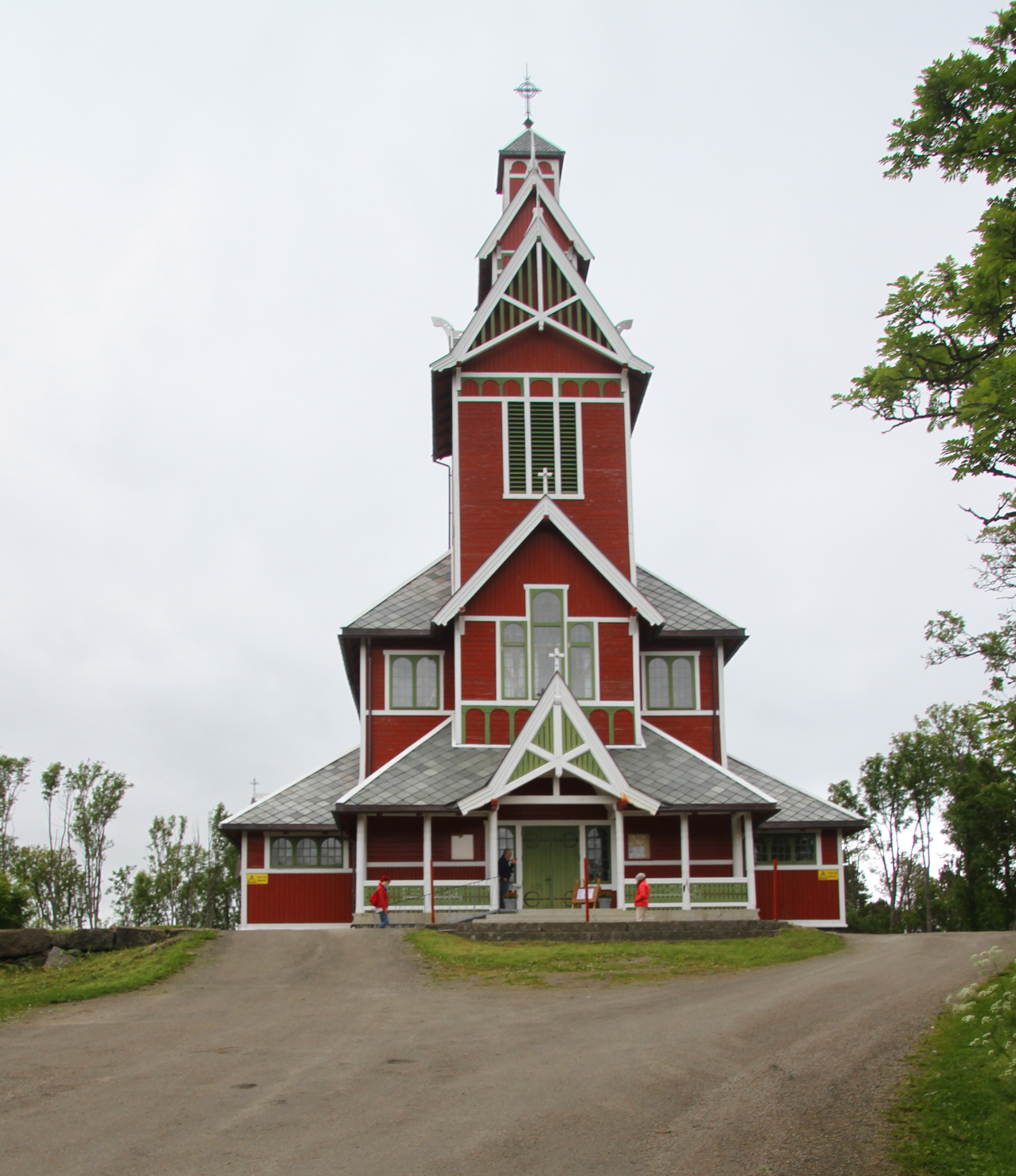
The Buksnes Church
