= Walter Kåre Tjønndal =

Norwegian politician

Walter Kåre Tjønndal (22 January 1923 – 23 March 2014) was a Norwegian politician for the Labour Party.

Tjønndal was born in January 1923 in Borge Municipality.

He was elected to the Norwegian Parliament from Nordland in 1969, but was not re-elected in 1973. On the local level he was a member of the municipal council of Hol Municipality from 1955 to 1963, serving the last four years as mayor. He then after a municipal merger, he became mayor of the successor Vestvågøy Municipality from 1963 to 1967. He chaired the municipal party chapter from 1963 to 1964.

Outside politics he worked in agriculture.
