= Hol Municipality (Nordland) =

Former municipality in Nordland, Norway

Hol Municipality Hol herred
- Former municipality
- Nordland within Norway

- Hol within Nordland
- Coordinates: 68°08′40″N 13°39′02″E
- Country: Norway
- County: Nordland
- District: Lofoten
- Established: 1 July 1919
  - Preceded by: Buksnes Municipality
- Disestablished: 1 Jan 1963
  - Succeeded by: Vestvågøy Municipality
- Administrative centre: Stamsund

Government
  - Mayor (1960-1962): Walter Tjønndal (Ap)

Area (upon dissolution)
  - Total: 67.5 km^{2} (26.1 sq mi)
  - Rank: #572 in Norway
- Highest elevation: 738 m (2,421 ft)

Population (1962)
  - Total: 3,104
  - Rank: #294 in Norway
  - Density: 46/km^{2} (120/sq mi)
  - Change (10 years): ▼ −3.5%
- Demonym: Hol-folk

Official language
  - Norwegian form: Bokmål
- Time zone: UTC+01:00 (CET)
  - Summer (DST): UTC+02:00 (CEST)
- ISO 3166 code: NO-1861

Hol is a former municipality in Nordland county, Norway. The 67.5-square-kilometre (26.1 sq mi) municipality existed from 1919 until its dissolution in 1963. Hol was located on the island of Vestvågøya in the southeastern part of what is now Vestvågøy Municipality. The administrative centre was located in Stamsund. The main church for Hol was Hol Church which is located just outside of the village of Fygle. The village of Steine was also located in the municipality.

Prior to its dissolution in 1963, the 67.5-square-kilometre (26.1 sq mi) municipality was the 572nd largest by area out of the 705 municipalities in Norway. Hol Municipality was the 294th most populous municipality in Norway with a population of about 3,104. The municipality's population density was 46 inhabitants per square kilometre (120/sq mi) and its population had decreased by 3.5% over the previous 10-year period.

== General information ==
The municipality of Hol was established on 1 July 1919 when the southeastern part of Buksnes Municipality was split off to become the new Hol Municipality. Initially, Hol Municipality had a population of 2,272. During the 1960s, there were many municipal mergers across Norway due to the work of the Schei Committee. On 1 January 1963, Hol Municipality (population: 3,154) was merged with the neighboring Borge Municipality (population: 4,056), Buksnes Municipality (population: 4,416), and Valberg Municipality (population: 662) to create the new Vestvågøy Municipality.

=== Name ===
The municipality (originally the parish) is named after the old Hol farm (Old Norse: Hóll) since the first Hol Church was built there. The name is derived from the word hóll which means "round hill".

=== Churches ===
The Church of Norway had one parish (sokn) within Hol Municipality. At the time of the municipal dissolution, it was part of the Buksnes prestegjeld and the Lofoten prosti (deanery) in the Diocese of Sør-Hålogaland.

Churches in Hol Municipality
Parish (sokn)	Church name	Location of the church	Year built
Hol	Hol Church	Berger	1806
Hol	Stamsund Church	Stamsund	1937

== Geography ==
The municipality was located on the southern part of the large island of Vestvågøya. Valberg Municipality was located to the northeast and Buksnes Municipality was to the north and west. The highest point in the municipality is the 738-metre (2,421 ft) tall mountain Justadtinden, which was located on the border with neighboring Valberg Municipality.

== Government ==
While it existed, Hol Municipality was responsible for primary education (through 10th grade), outpatient health services, senior citizen services, welfare and other social services, zoning, economic development, and municipal roads and utilities. The municipality was governed by a municipal council of directly elected representatives. The mayor was indirectly elected by a vote of the municipal council. The municipality was under the jurisdiction of the Hålogaland Court of Appeal.

=== Municipal council ===
The municipal council (Herredsstyre) of Hol Municipality was made up of 17 representatives that were elected to four year terms. The tables below show the historical composition of the council by political party.

Hol herredsstyre 1959–1962
Party name (in Norwegian)	Number of representatives
Labour Party (Arbeiderpartiet)	10
Conservative Party (Høyre)	4
Christian Democratic Party (Kristelig Folkeparti)	1
Local List(s) (Lokale lister)	2
Total number of members:	17
Note: On 1 January 1963, Hol Municipality became part of Vestvågøy Municipality.

Hol herredsstyre 1955–1959
Party name (in Norwegian)	Number of representatives
Labour Party (Arbeiderpartiet)	9
Conservative Party (Høyre)	5
Christian Democratic Party (Kristelig Folkeparti)	1
Local List(s) (Lokale lister)	2
Total number of members:	17

Hol herredsstyre 1951–1955
Party name (in Norwegian)	Number of representatives
Labour Party (Arbeiderpartiet)	8
Christian Democratic Party (Kristelig Folkeparti)	2
Joint List(s) of Non-Socialist Parties (Borgerlige Felleslister)	5
Local List(s) (Lokale lister)	1
Total number of members:	16

Hol herredsstyre 1947–1951
Party name (in Norwegian)	Number of representatives
Labour Party (Arbeiderpartiet)	10
Christian Democratic Party (Kristelig Folkeparti)	1
Joint List(s) of Non-Socialist Parties (Borgerlige Felleslister)	5
Total number of members:	16

Hol herredsstyre 1945–1947
Party name (in Norwegian)	Number of representatives
Labour Party (Arbeiderpartiet)	5
Communist Party (Kommunistiske Parti)	5
Christian Democratic Party (Kristelig Folkeparti)	1
Joint List(s) of Non-Socialist Parties (Borgerlige Felleslister)	4
Local List(s) (Lokale lister)	1
Total number of members:	16

Hol herredsstyre 1937–1941*
Party name (in Norwegian)	Number of representatives
Labour Party (Arbeiderpartiet)	10
Joint List(s) of Non-Socialist Parties (Borgerlige Felleslister)	6
Total number of members:	16
Note: Due to the German occupation of Norway during World War II, no elections were held for new municipal councils until after the war ended in 1945.

=== Mayors ===
The mayor (Norwegian: ordfører) of Hol Municipality was the political leader of the municipality and the chairperson of the municipal council. Here is a list of people who have held this position:

- 1919–1919: Andreas Tetlie
- 1920–1922: Ingvald Martin Johansen
- 1923–1925: Andreas Tetlie
- 1926–1931: Johan Dreier Pettersen
- 1932–1934: Mathias J. Waldahl
- 1935–1937: Ole Gottlin Johan Lauvdal
- 1938–1941: Jarle Holst Try
- 1941–1945: Ole Martin Johansen
- 1945–1945: Arne Rasmussen
- 1946–1946: Martin J. Hol
- 1946–1959: Karl Leirfall
- 1960–1962: Walter Kåre Tjønndal (Ap)

== Media gallery ==
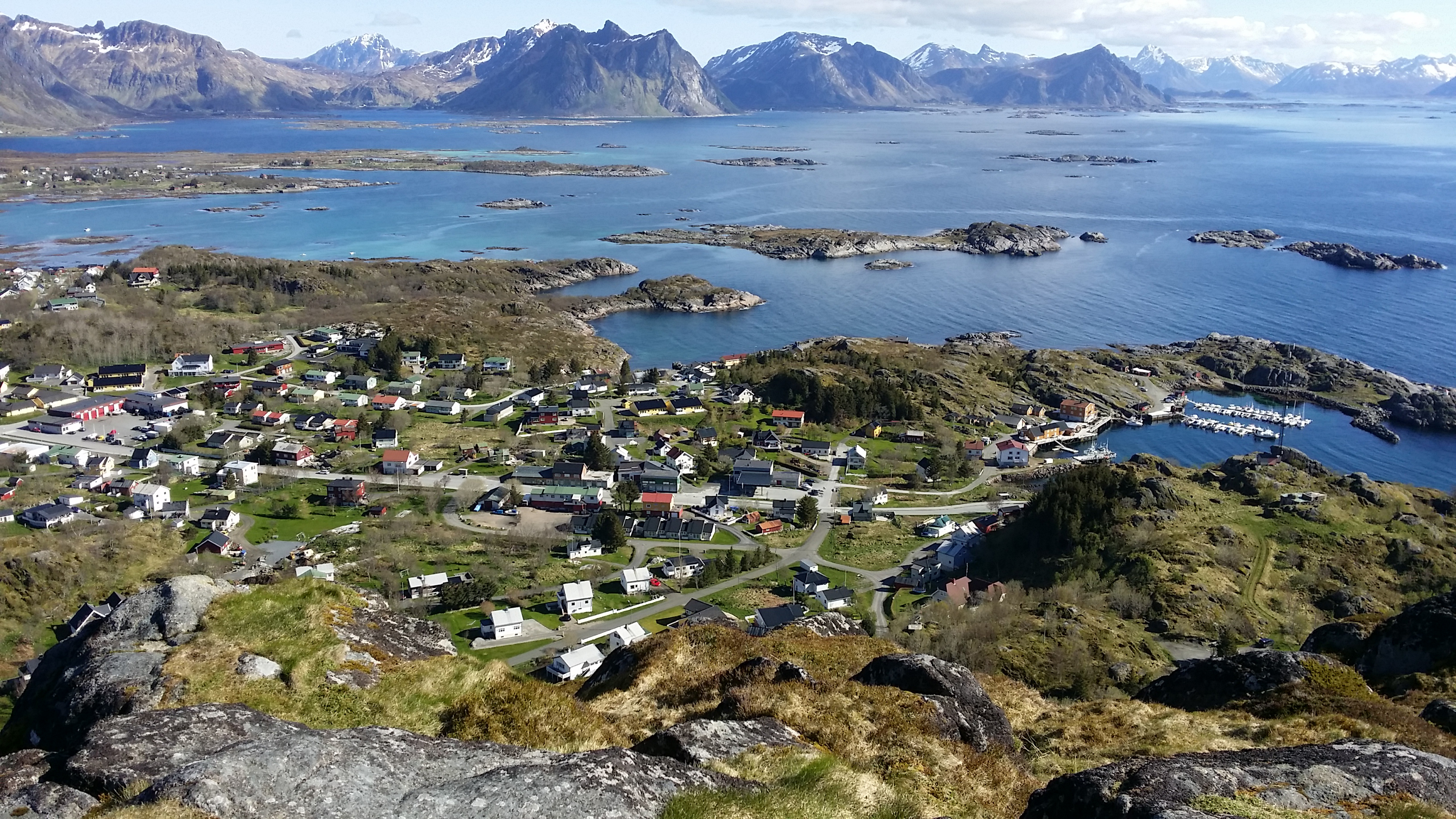
View of Stamsund

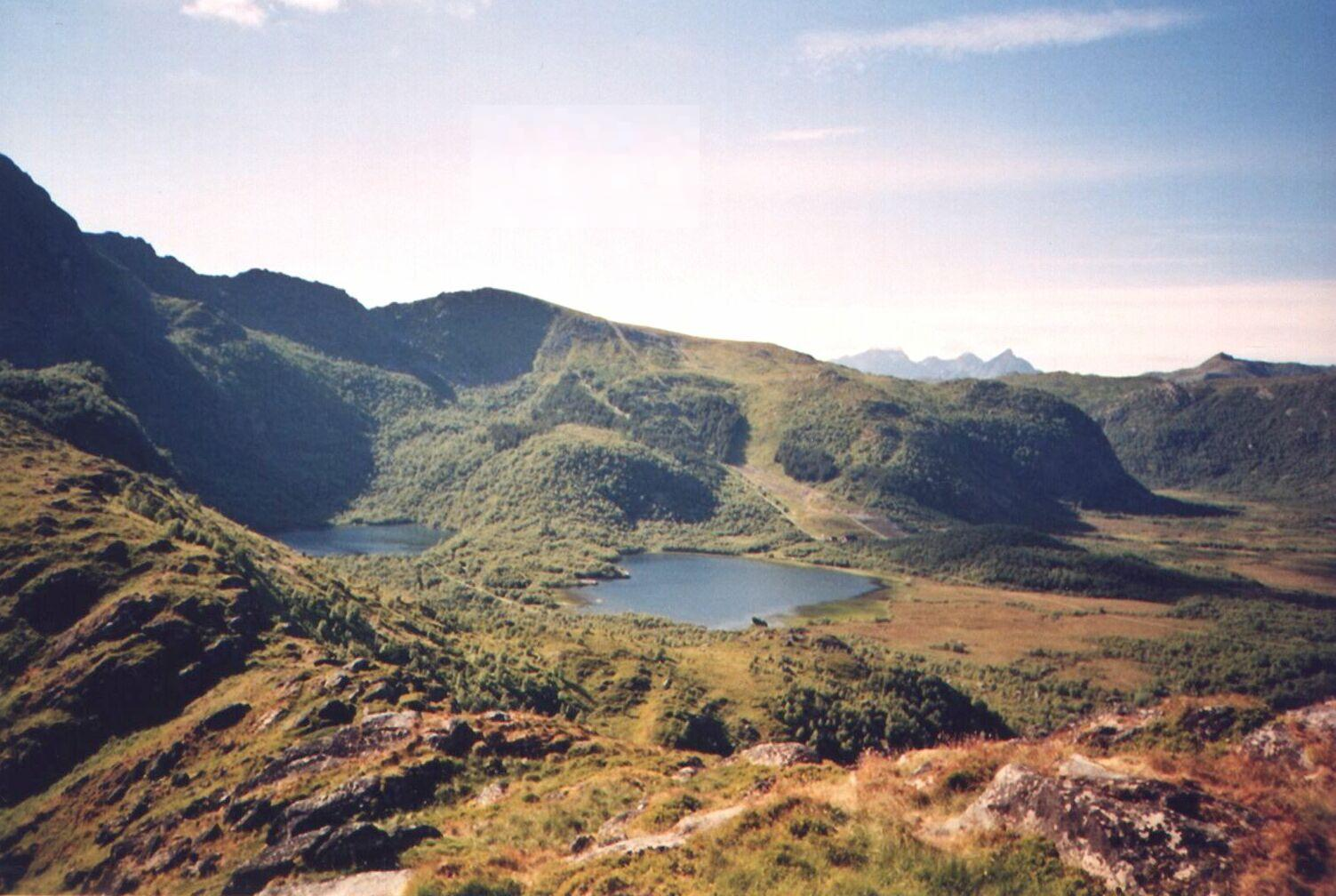
Landscape around Stamsund

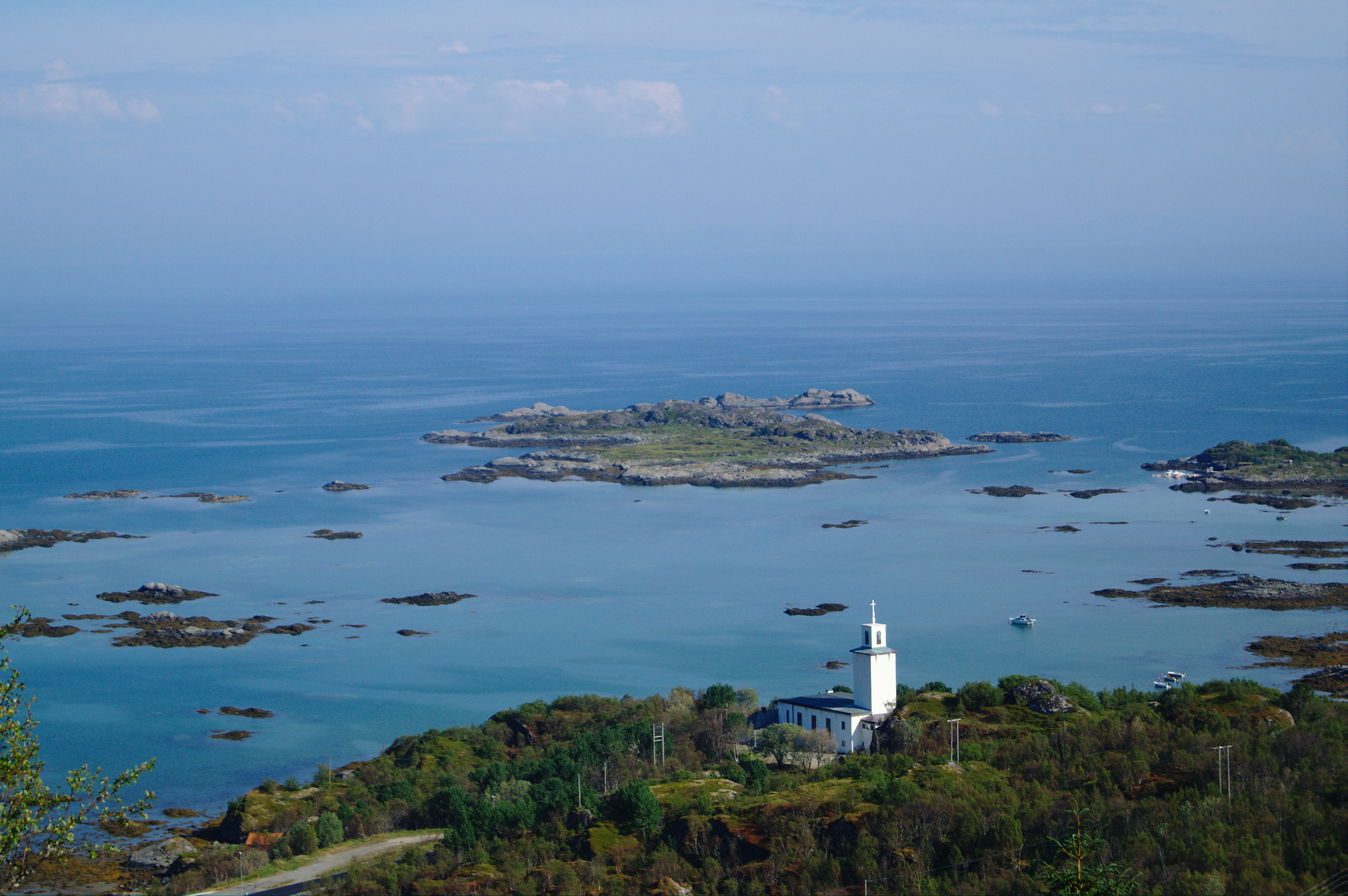
Church in Stamsund

== See also ==
- List of former municipalities of Norway
