= Valberg Municipality =

Former municipality in Nordland, Norway

Valberg Municipality Valberg herred
- Former municipality
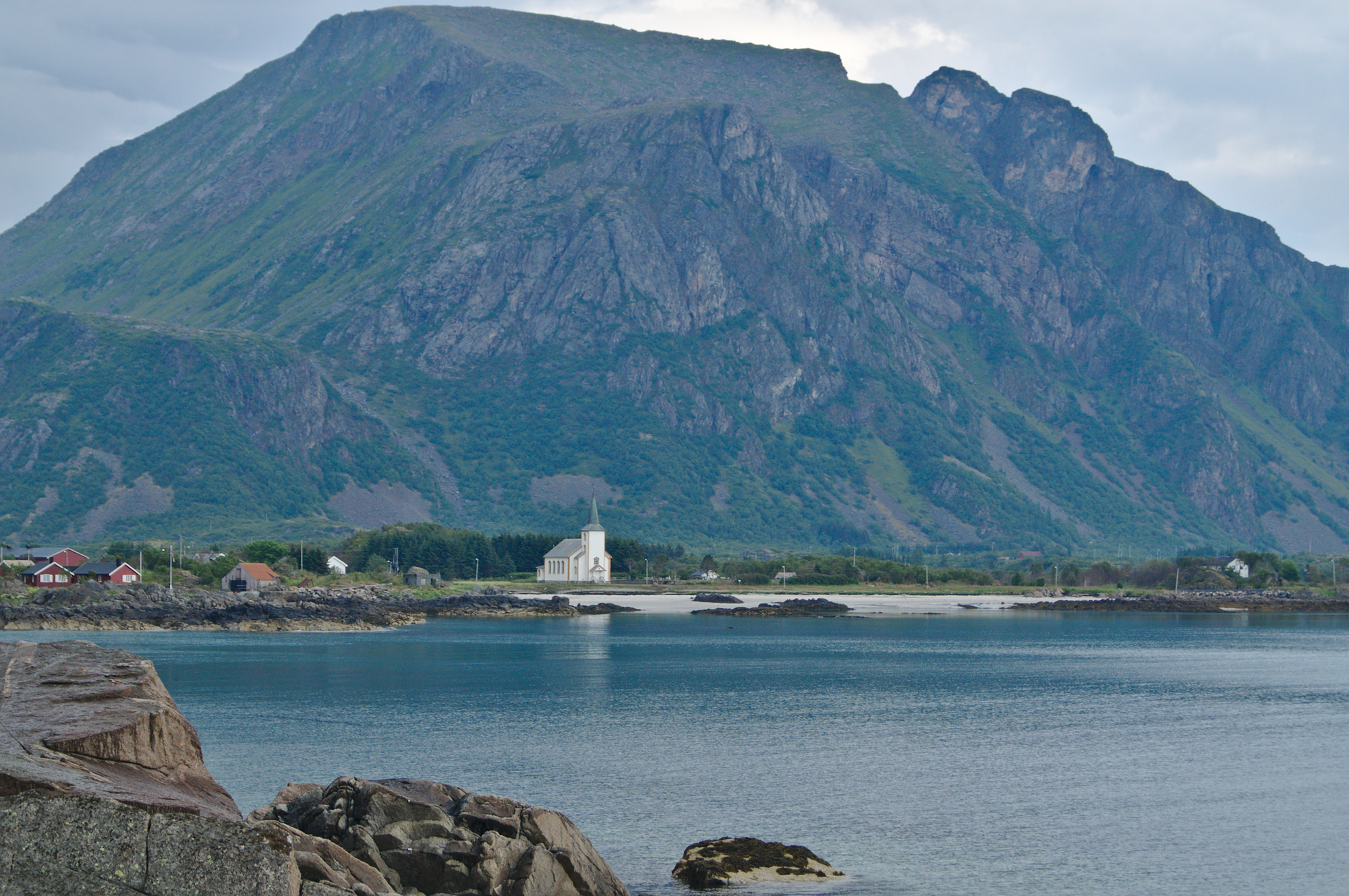
- View of the village surrounding Valberg Church

- Nordland within Norway

- Valberg within Nordland
- Coordinates: 68.1950°N 13.9404°E
- Country: Norway
- County: Nordland
- District: Lofoten
- Established: 1927
  - Preceded by: Borge Municipality
- Disestablished: 1 Jan 1963
  - Succeeded by: Vestvågøy Municipality
- Administrative centre: Valberg

Area (upon dissolution)
  - Total: 56.9 km^{2} (22.0 sq mi)
  - Rank: #593 in Norway
- Highest elevation: 738 m (2,421 ft)

Population (1962)
  - Total: 672
  - Rank: #671 in Norway
  - Density: 11.8/km^{2} (31/sq mi)
  - Change (10 years): ▼ −9.1%
- Demonym: Valbergfolk

Official language
  - Norwegian form: Neutral
- Time zone: UTC+01:00 (CET)
  - Summer (DST): UTC+02:00 (CEST)
- ISO 3166 code: NO-1863

Valberg is a former municipality in Nordland county, Norway. The 57-square-kilometre (22 sq mi) municipality existed from 1927 until 1963. The municipality covered the southeastern coast of the island of Vestvågøya in what is now Vestvågøy Municipality. The administrative centre was the village of Valberg where Valberg Church is located.

Prior to its dissolution in 1963, the 57-square-kilometre (22 sq mi) municipality was the 593rd largest by area out of the 705 municipalities in Norway. Valberg Municipality was the 671st most populous municipality in Norway with a population of about 672. The municipality's population density was 11.8 inhabitants per square kilometre (31/sq mi) and its population had decreased by 9.1% over the previous 10-year period.

== General information ==
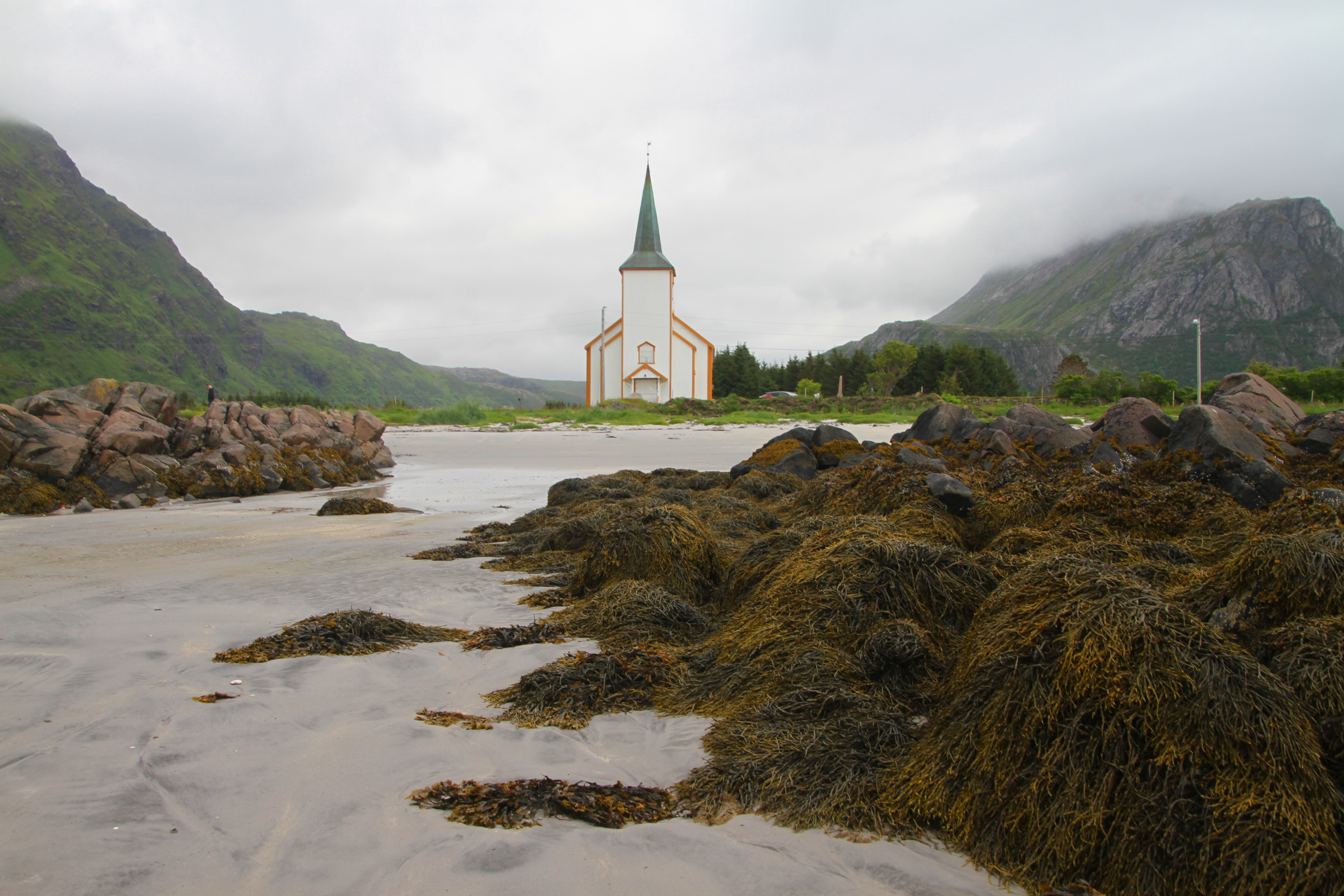
Valberg Church

The municipality of Valberg was established by a royal resolution on 25 February 1927 after an acrimonious split within the large Borge Municipality. The southern part of Borge became the new Valberg Municipality (population: 625). During the 1960s, there were many municipal mergers across Norway due to the work of the Schei Committee. On 1 January 1963, Valberg Municipality (population: 662) was merged with the neighboring Borge Municipality (population: 4,056), Buksnes Municipality (population: 4,416), and Hol Municipality (population: 3,154) to create the new Vestvågøy Municipality.

=== Name ===
The municipality (originally the parish) is named after the old Valberg farm (Old Norse: Valberg or Valaberg) since the first Valberg Church was built there. The farm was named after a nearby mountain. The first element is valr which means "falcon". The last element is berg which means "mountain".

=== Churches ===
The Church of Norway had one parish (sokn) within Valberg Municipality. At the time of the municipal dissolution, it was part of the Borge prestegjeld and the Lofoten prosti (deanery) in the Diocese of Sør-Hålogaland.

Churches in Valberg Municipality
| Parish (sokn) | Church name | Location of the church | Year built |
|---|---|---|---|
| Valberg | Valberg Church | Valberg | 1889 |

== Geography ==
The municipality was located on the southeastern part of the island of Vestvågøya. Hol Municipality was located to the west, Borge Municipality was to the north, and Gimsøy Municipality and Vågan Municipality were to the east (on the islands of Gimsøya and Austvågøya). The highest point in Valberg Municipality is the 738-metre (2,421 ft) tall mountain Justadtinden, which was located on the border with neighboring Hol Municipality.

== Government ==
While it existed, Valberg Municipality was responsible for primary education (through 10th grade), outpatient health services, senior citizen services, welfare and other social services, zoning, economic development, and municipal roads and utilities. The municipality was governed by a municipal council of directly elected representatives. The mayor was indirectly elected by a vote of the municipal council. The municipality was under the jurisdiction of the Hålogaland Court of Appeal.

=== Municipal council ===
The municipal council (Herredsstyre) of Valberg Municipality was made up of 13 representatives that were elected to four year terms. The tables below show the historical composition of the council by political party.

Valberg herredsstyre 1959–1962
| Party name (in Norwegian) | Number of representatives |
|---|---|
| List of workers, fishermen, and small farmholders (Arbeidere, fiskere, småbrukere liste) | 7 |
| Local List(s) (Lokale lister) | 6 |
| Total number of members: | 13 |
Note: On 1 January 1963, Valberg Municipality became part of Vestvågøy Municipality.

Valberg herredsstyre 1955–1959
| Party name (in Norwegian) | Number of representatives |
|---|---|
| Labour Party (Arbeiderpartiet) | 6 |
| Joint List(s) of Non-Socialist Parties (Borgerlige Felleslister) | 7 |
| Total number of members: | 13 |

Valberg herredsstyre 1951–1955
| Party name (in Norwegian) | Number of representatives |
|---|---|
| Labour Party (Arbeiderpartiet) | 5 |
| Joint List(s) of Non-Socialist Parties (Borgerlige Felleslister) | 7 |
| Total number of members: | 12 |

Valberg herredsstyre 1947–1951
| Party name (in Norwegian) | Number of representatives |
|---|---|
| Labour Party (Arbeiderpartiet) | 6 |
| Joint List(s) of Non-Socialist Parties (Borgerlige Felleslister) | 6 |
| Total number of members: | 12 |

Valberg herredsstyre 1945–1947
| Party name (in Norwegian) | Number of representatives |
|---|---|
| Labour Party (Arbeiderpartiet) | 7 |
| Joint List(s) of Non-Socialist Parties (Borgerlige Felleslister) | 5 |
| Total number of members: | 12 |

Valberg herredsstyre 1937–1941*
| Party name (in Norwegian) | Number of representatives |
|---|---|
| Labour Party (Arbeiderpartiet) | 5 |
| Joint List(s) of Non-Socialist Parties (Borgerlige Felleslister) | 7 |
| Total number of members: | 12 |
Note: Due to the German occupation of Norway during World War II, no elections were held for new municipal councils until after the war ended in 1945.

=== Mayors ===
The mayor (Norwegian: ordfører) of Valberg Municipality was the political leader of the municipality and the chairperson of the municipal council. Here is a list of people who have held this position:

- 1927–1928: Ole Moland
- 1929–1930: N. Finstad
- 1931–1934: Ragnar Riksheim
- 1935–1942: Arne Blix (H)
- 1942–1945: Ole Martin Johansen (NS)
- 1945–1945: Arne Blix (H)
- 1946–1951: Paul Jensen (Ap)
- 1951–1959: Arne Blix (H)
- 1959–1962: Paul Jensen (Ap)

== See also ==
- List of former municipalities of Norway
