= Valberg, Nordland =

Village in Vestvågøy Municipality, Norway

Valberg
- Village
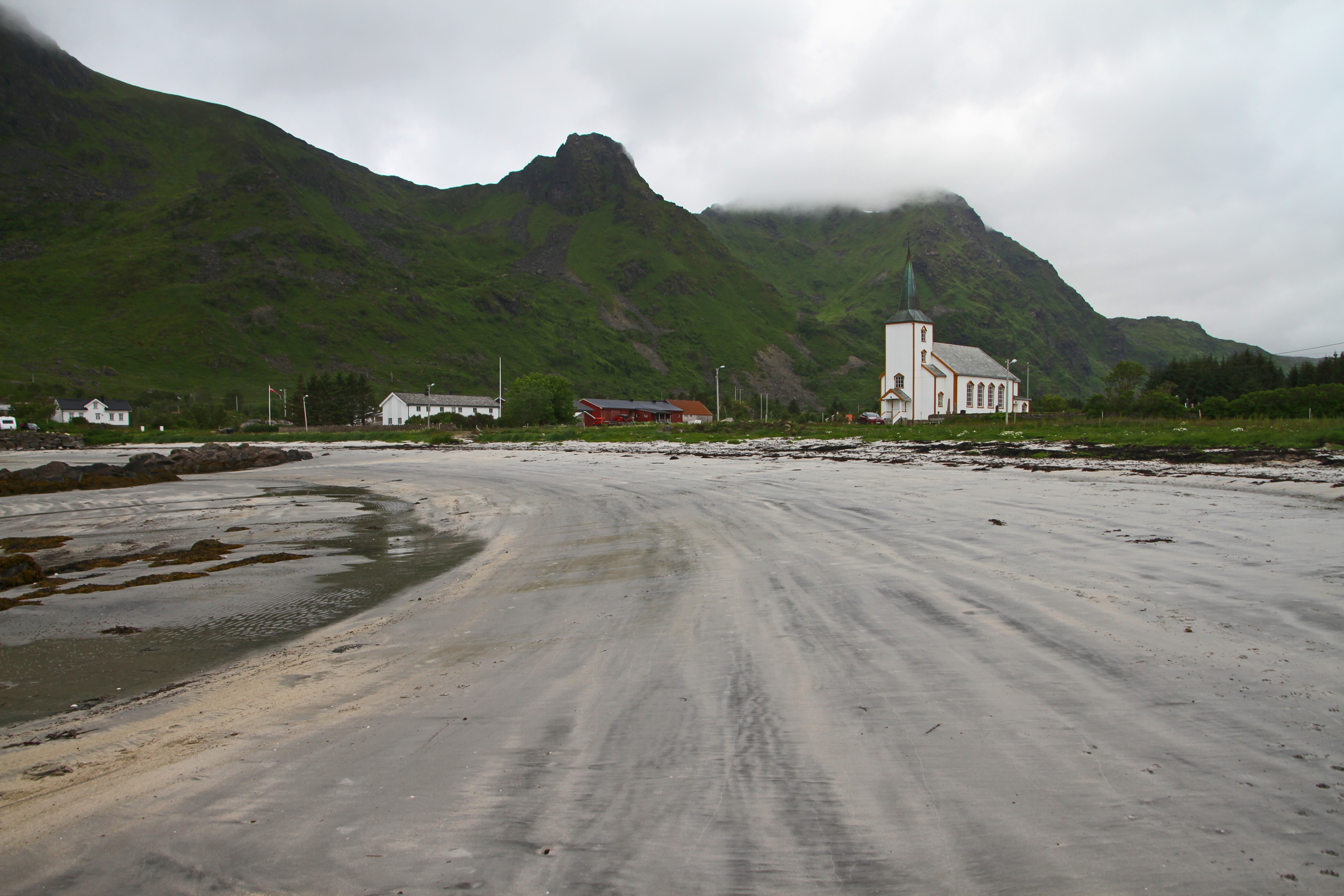
- View of the village area
- Interactive map of Valberg
- Location within Nordland Location within Norway
- Coordinates: 68.19498°N 13.94036°E
- Country: Norway
- Region: Northern Norway
- County: Nordland
- District: Lofoten
- Municipality: Moskenes Municipality
- Elevation: 5 m (16 ft)
- Time zone: UTC+01:00 (CET)
  - Summer (DST): UTC+02:00 (CEST)
- Post Code: 8370 Leknes

Valberg is a village in Vestvågøy Municipality in Nordland county, Norway. The village is located on the southern shore of the island of Vestvågøya, about 8 kilometres (5.0 mi) northeast (across the fjord) from Stamsund and about 20 kilometres (12 mi) northeast of the town of Leknes. Valberg Church is located in the village.

Historically, this village was the administrative centre of Valberg Municipality which existed from 1927 until 1963 when it became part of the larger Vestvågøy Municipality.
