= Valberg Church =

Church in Nordland, Norway

- Valberg kirke
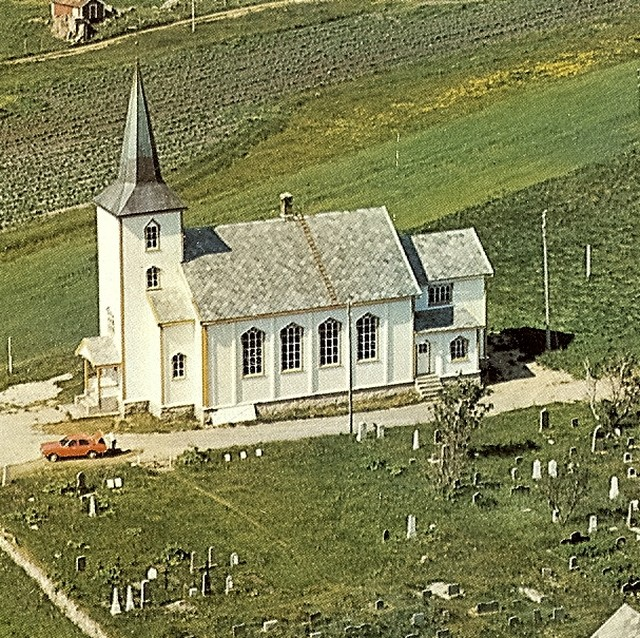
- View of the church
- Valberg Church
- 68.19216307°N 13.94212916°E
- Location: Vestvågøy, Nordland
- Country: Norway
- Denomination: Church of Norway
- Churchmanship: Evangelical Lutheran

History
- Status: Parish church
- Founded: 1660
- Consecrated: 12 September 1889

Architecture
- Functional status: Active
- Architect: Andreas Grenstad
- Architectural type: Long church
- Completed: 1889 (137 years ago)

Specifications
- Capacity: 280
- Materials: Wood

Administration
- Diocese: Sør-Hålogaland
- Deanery: Lofoten prosti
- Parish: Valberg
- Norwegian Cultural Heritage Site
- Type: Church
- Status: Not protected
- ID: 85742

Valberg Church (Norwegian: Valberg kirke) is a parish church of the Church of Norway in Vestvågøy Municipality in Nordland county, Norway. It is located in the village of Valberg on the island of Vestvågøya. It is the church for the Valberg parish which is part of the Lofoten prosti (deanery) in the Diocese of Sør-Hålogaland. The white, wooden church was built in a long church style in 1889 using plans drawn up by the architect Andreas Grenstad. The church seats about 280 people.

== History ==
The first church at Valberg was built around 1660 on a site near the present church site (but not the same site). It shared a priest with Buksnes Church until 1740 when it was transferred to the Borge prestegjeld (parish). In 1749, the church was destroyed during a powerful storm. In 1752, a new Valberg Church was completed, but not on the same site as before (it was built on the present church site). The church was a long church with no tower or sacristy. The walls were painted red with a tarred roof. Later, a tower was added to the roof.

In 1814, this church served as an election church (Norwegian: valgkirke). Together with more than 300 other parish churches across Norway, it was a polling station for elections to the 1814 Norwegian Constituent Assembly which wrote the Constitution of Norway. This was Norway's first national elections. Each church parish was a constituency that elected people called "electors" who later met together in each county to elect the representatives for the assembly that was to meet at Eidsvoll Manor later that year.

This church building was destroyed in a storm in 1818. A third church building was completed the next year in 1819. That church was used until 1888 when a new church (the present church) was built right next to the previous church. The church was constructed for about 16,700 kr and it was consecrated on 12 September 1889. The old church was torn down in 1890. There were extensive renovations done on the building in the early 1950s.

=== Priests ===
The following priests have served the church:

- 1665–1670: Carl Olufsen Brock
- 1670–1718: Hans Hansen Jentoft
- 1718–1738: Christopher Normann
- 1738–1750: Melchior Meldal
- 1750–1751: Leonard Sidenius
- 1752–1756: Jakob Krefting
- 1756–1770: Jonas Sidenius
- 1771–1778: Knud Juel
- 1778–1780: Jørgen Grach
- 1789–1792: Elias Schønning Dreyer
- 1792–1834: Henning Johannes Irgins
- 1834–1844: Hans Nicolai Wraamann
- 1845–1857: Arent Uchermann
- 1857–1870: Christian August Heyerdal
- 1870–1877: Søren Koch
- 1877–1882: Olaf H. Skattebøl
- 1882–1883: H. Warholm
- 1883–1888: M.V. Echhoff
- 1888–1895: Søren H.H. Swensen
- 1895–1907: Hans D.W. Smith
- 1907–1908: Lars R. Landmark
- 1908–1912: S.S. Gramstad
- 1913–1920: H.J. Knardahl
- 1920–1926: J.O. Bang
- 1926–1947: Hans Søvik
- 1948–1958: Ole Robert Kirkerød
- 1959–1969: Sigurd J. Sivertsen
- 1969–1976: Asbjørn Bjarne Reknes
- 1976–1977: Ivar Ruud
- 1977–1982: Knut Are Anton Eikrem
- 1982–1983: Trygve Knutsen
- 1983–2003: Harold Holtermannn
- 2003–2009: Uffe Kronborg
- 2010-2011: Jan Sahl
- 2012-2015: Aud Sigurdsen
- Since 2015: Trond Gran

== Media gallery ==
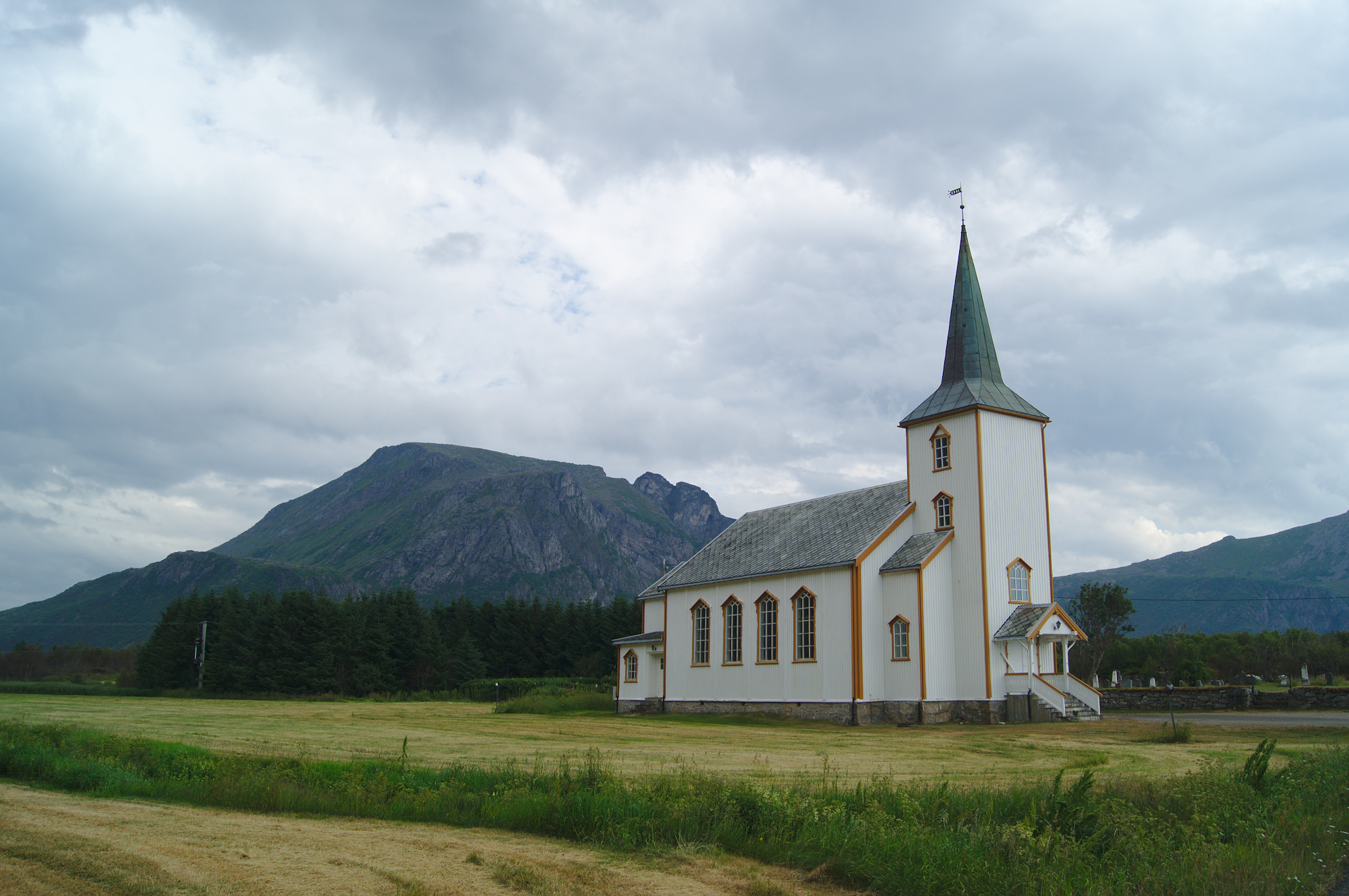

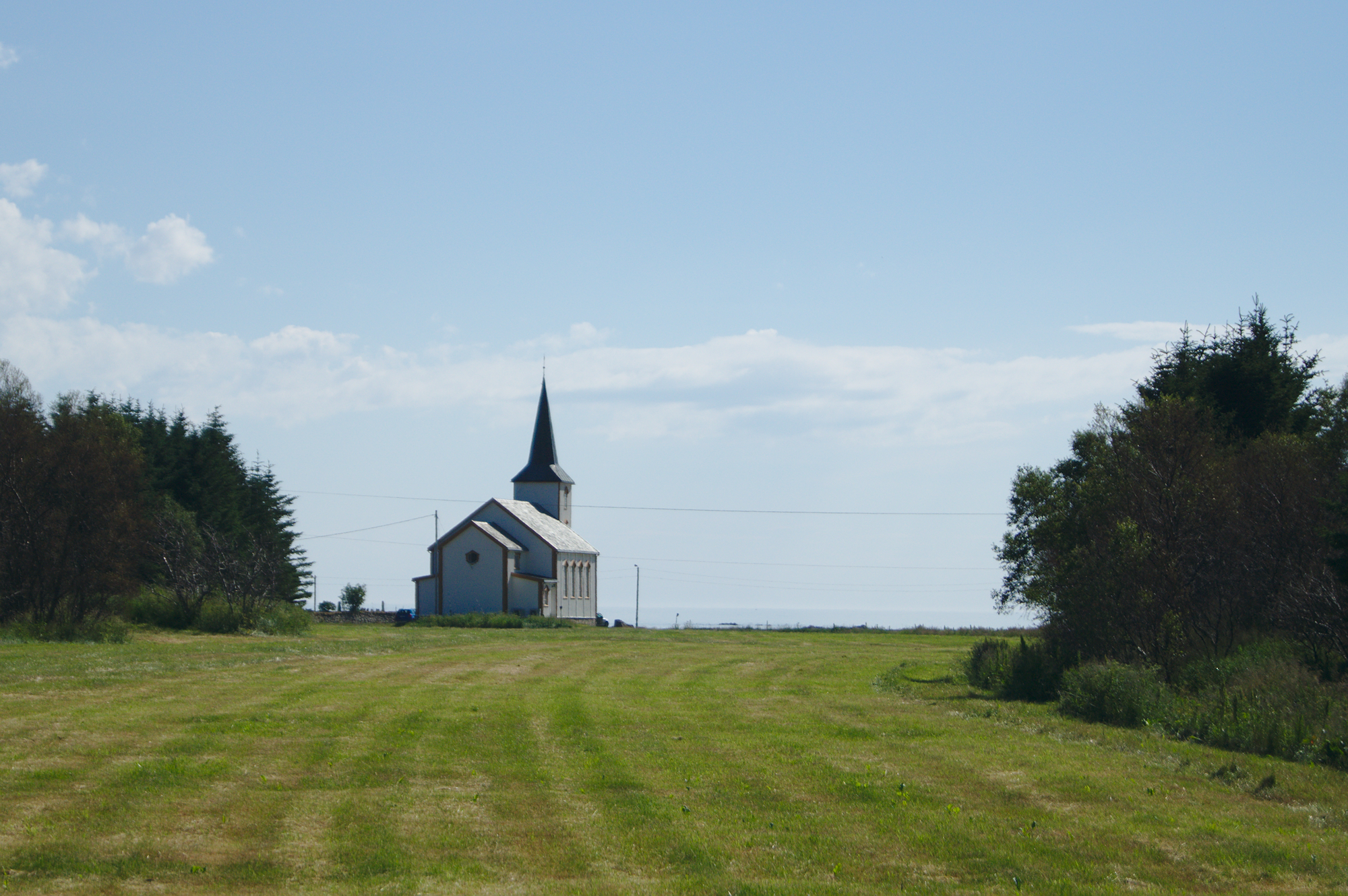

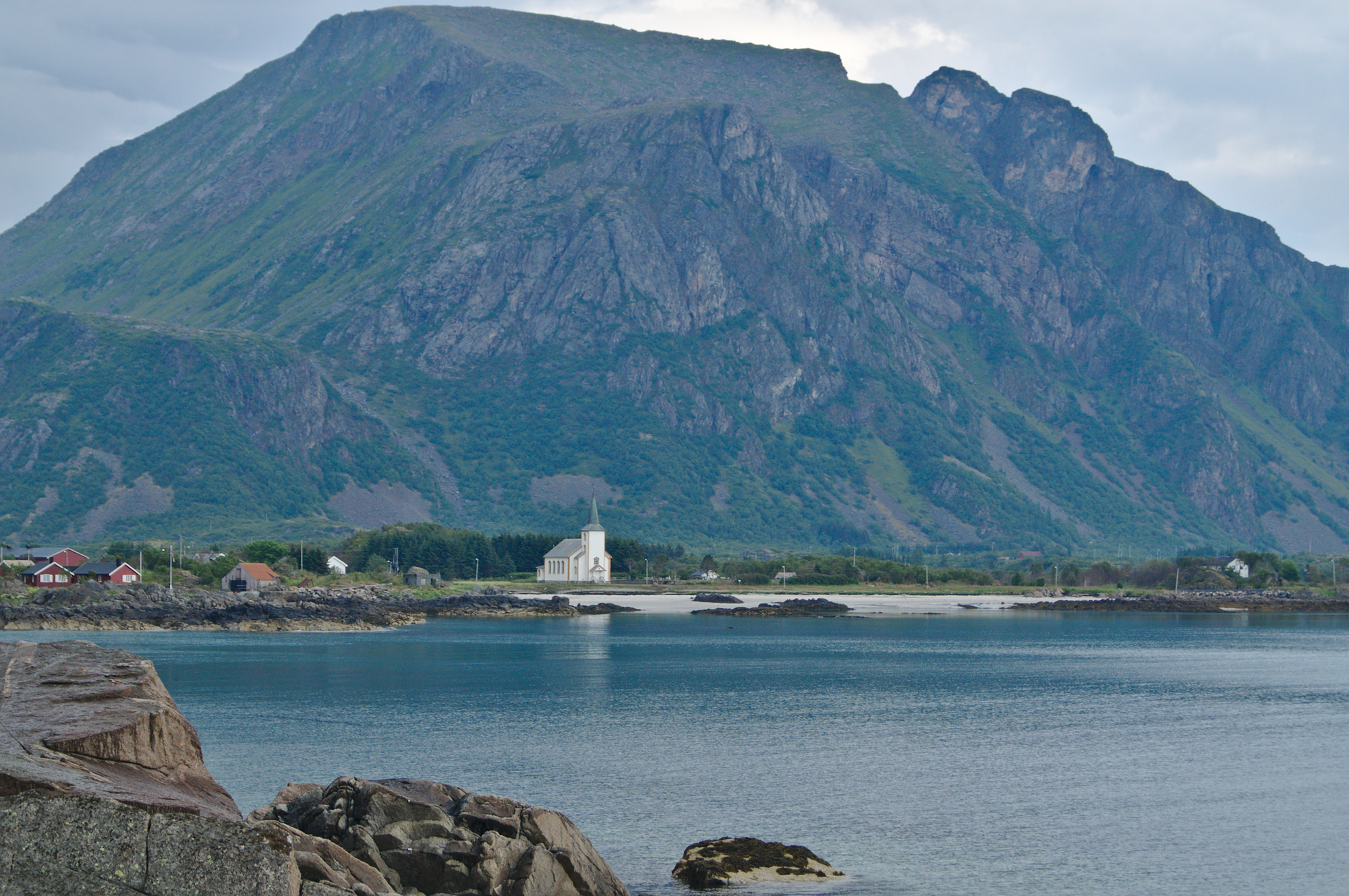

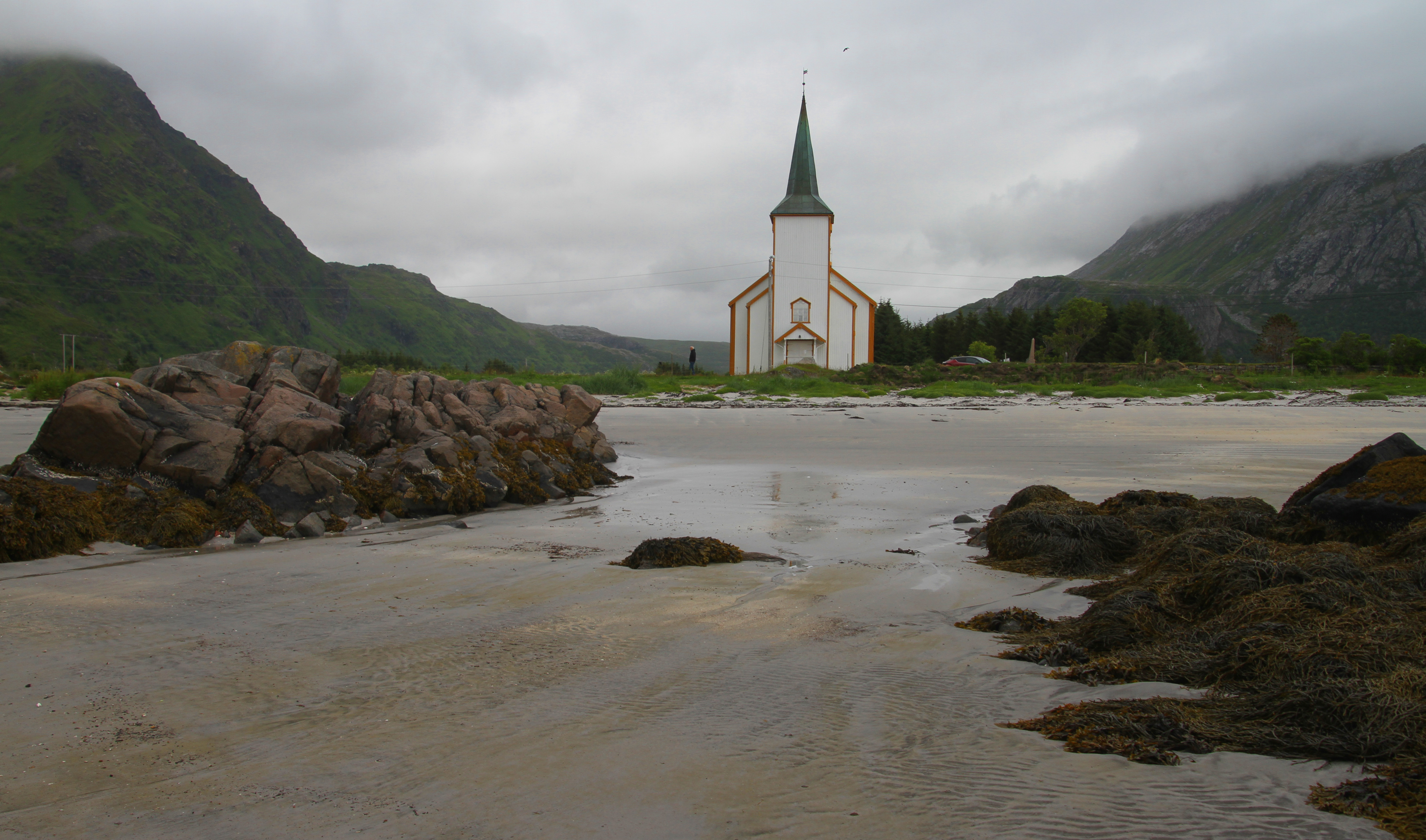

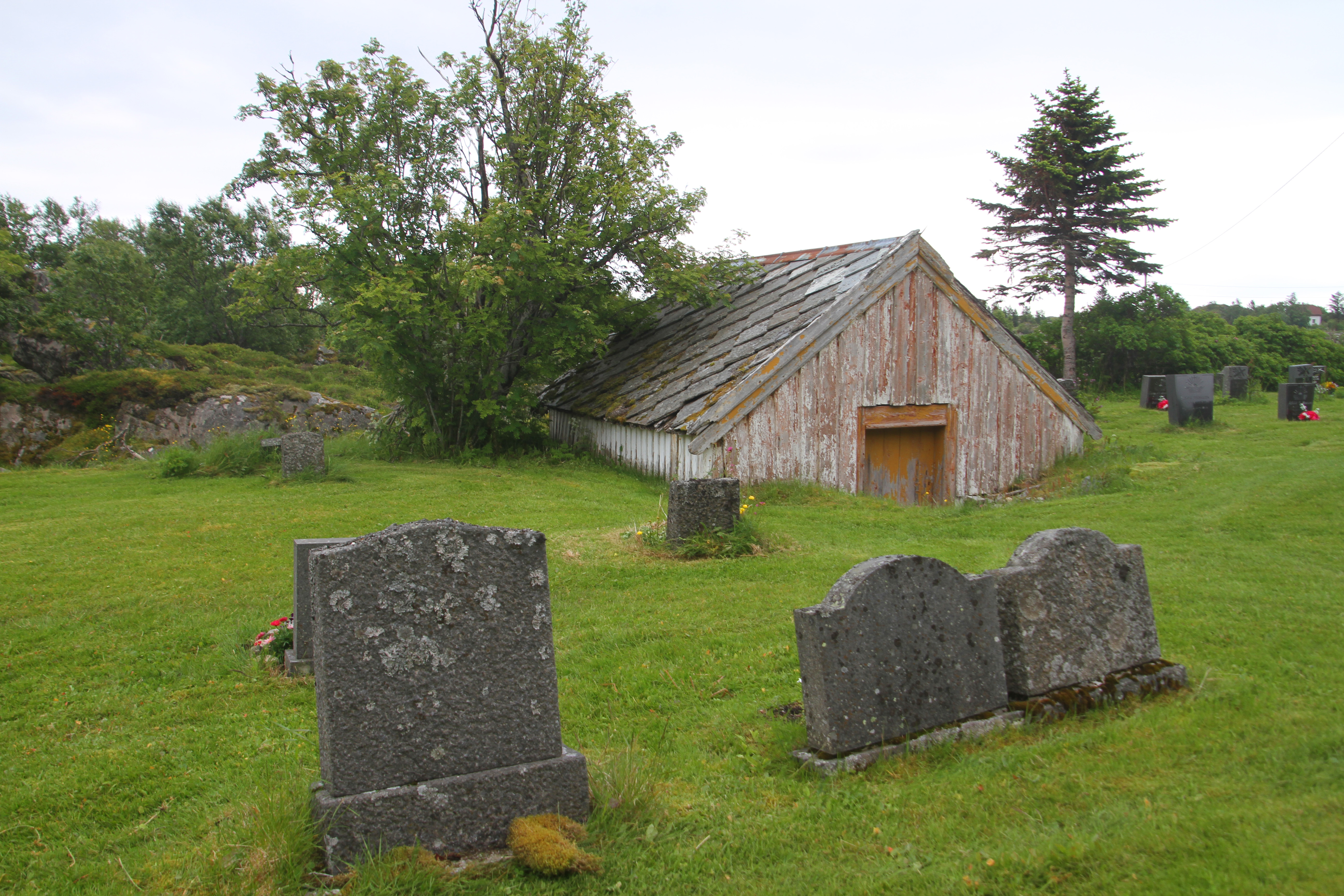

== See also ==
- List of churches in Sør-Hålogaland
