= Buksnes Church =

- Buksnes kirke
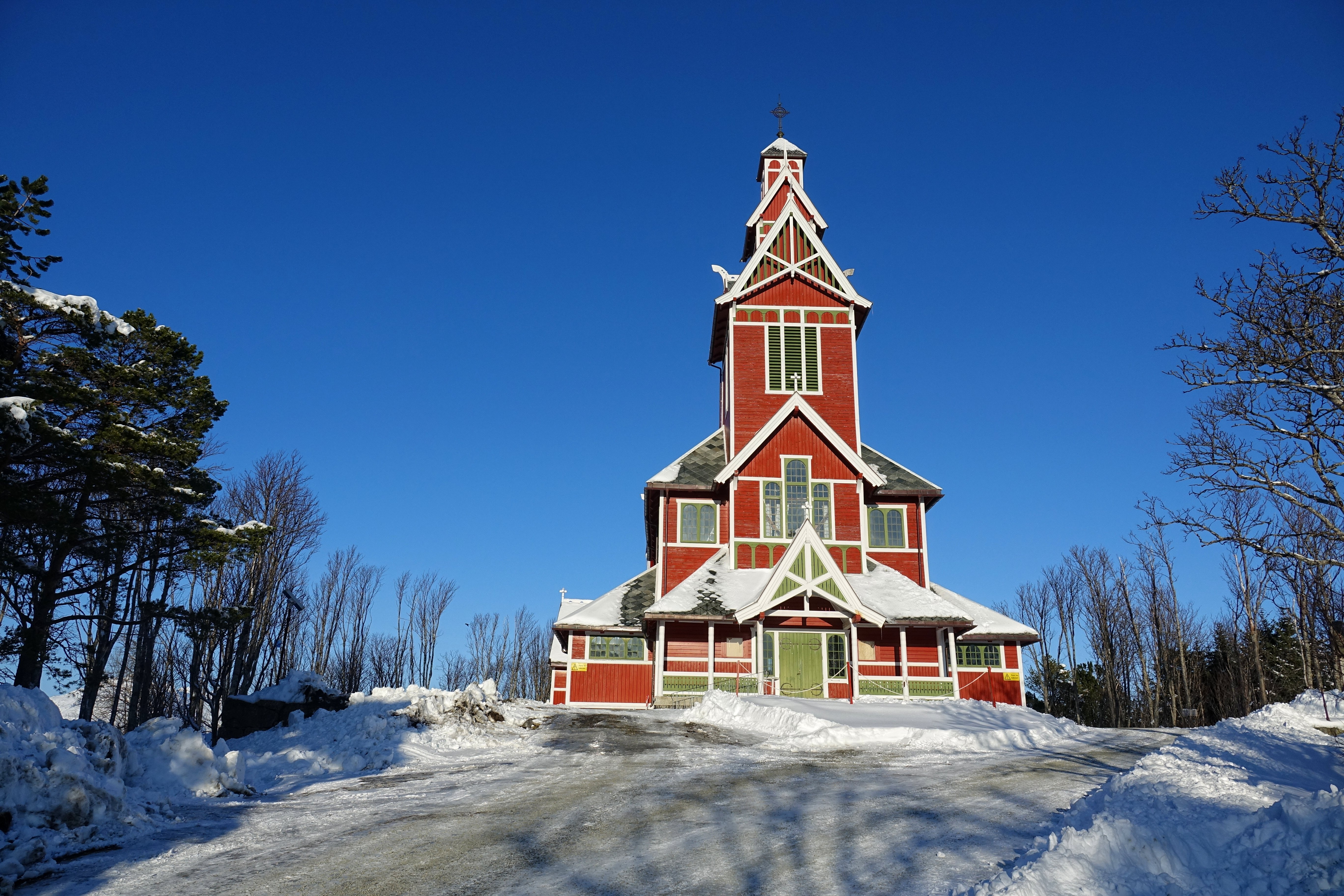
- View of the church
- Buksnes Church
- 68.11714670°N 13.5603261°E
- Location: Vestvågøy, Nordland
- Country: Norway
- Denomination: Church of Norway
- Churchmanship: Evangelical Lutheran

History
- Status: Parish church
- Founded: 13th century
- Consecrated: 22 November 1905

Architecture
- Functional status: Active
- Architect: Karl Norum
- Architectural type: Long church
- Completed: 1905 (121 years ago)

Specifications
- Capacity: 600
- Materials: Wood

Administration
- Diocese: Sør-Hålogaland
- Deanery: Lofoten prosti
- Parish: Buksnes
- Norwegian Cultural Heritage Site
- Type: Church
- Status: Listed
- ID: 83973

Buksnes Church (Norwegian: Buksnes kirke) is a parish church of the Church of Norway in Vestvågøy Municipality in Nordland county, Norway. It is located in the village of Gravdal on the island of Vestvågøya. It is the church for the Buksnes parish which is part of the Lofoten prosti (deanery) in the Diocese of Sør-Hålogaland. The red, wooden, Dragestil church was built in a long church style in 1905 using plans drawn up by the architect Karl Norum. The church seats about 600 people.

== History ==
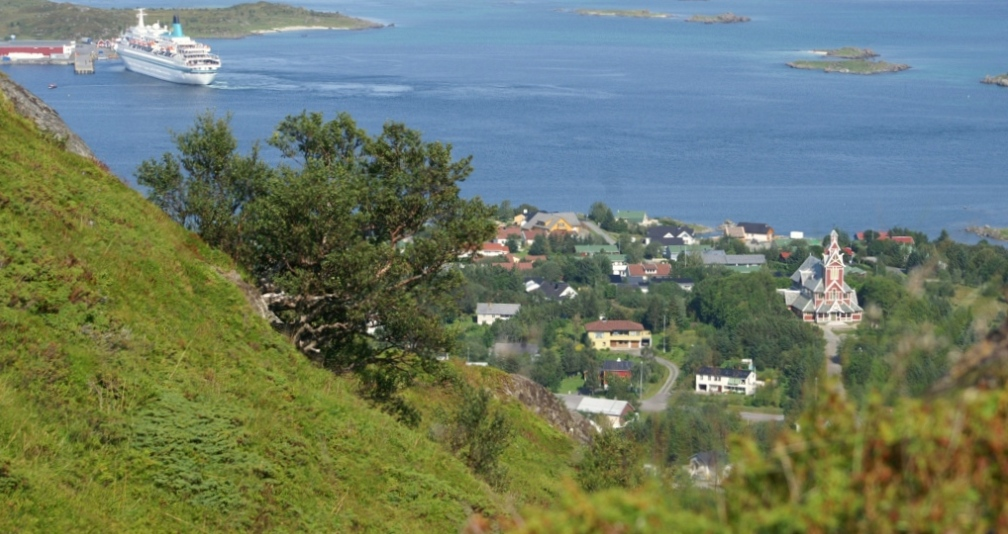
View of the church

The Buksnes church site has been in use for centuries. The first written record referring to the church at Buksnes dates back to 1324, but the church was not built that year. There have been several church buildings on the site over the years. The first church on the site was located about 150 metres (490 ft) east of the present church site in what is now a part of the cemetery. The old medieval church was badly damaged in a storm in 1639, so a new, wooden church was completed on the same site in 1641. This church was described in 1750 as having a large tower and a large fenced cemetery. In 1802, the church was deemed to be in very poor condition after multiple repairs over the years, so it was decided to tear down the old church and rebuild a brand new one on the same site. They reused the materials from the old church that were still in good condition.

In 1814, this church served as an election church (Norwegian: valgkirke). Together with more than 300 other parish churches across Norway, it was a polling station for elections to the 1814 Norwegian Constituent Assembly which wrote the Constitution of Norway. This was Norway's first national elections. Each church parish was a constituency that elected people called "electors" who later met together in each county to elect the representatives for the assembly that was to meet at Eidsvoll Manor later that year.

In 1882, the church was again heavily damaged in a storm. It is said that the tower and spire were blown off the church by the powerful storm and the spire was blown into the ground and deeply embedded. So afterwards, the church was torn down and a new church was built on the same site in 1885. The new church was a cruciform design and it seated about 640 people. On 26 January 1903 the church was struck by lightning and it burned down.

Planning for a new church began soon after. It was decided to build the new church in another part of the churchyard, about 150 metres (490 ft) to the west of the old church site. Drawings for the new building were designed by Karl Norum and were approved on 6 February 1904. Site work and construction soon began and it was consecrated on 22 November 1905 by Bishop Peter W. K. Bøckman. This red, wooden church was built in dragestil ("Dragon style"), a popular design in early 20th century Scandinavia. The old church was torn down after the fire and that area was used to expand the graveyard. Electric power and heat were installed after World War II. The church was renovated in 1965-1967 when some structural defects were corrected.

== Media gallery ==
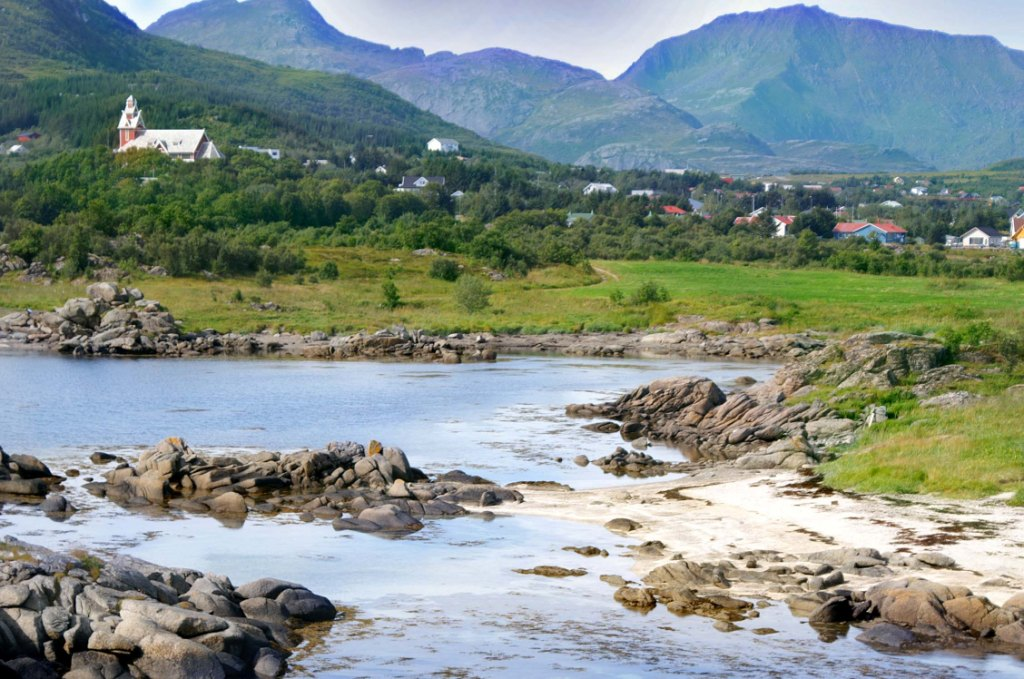

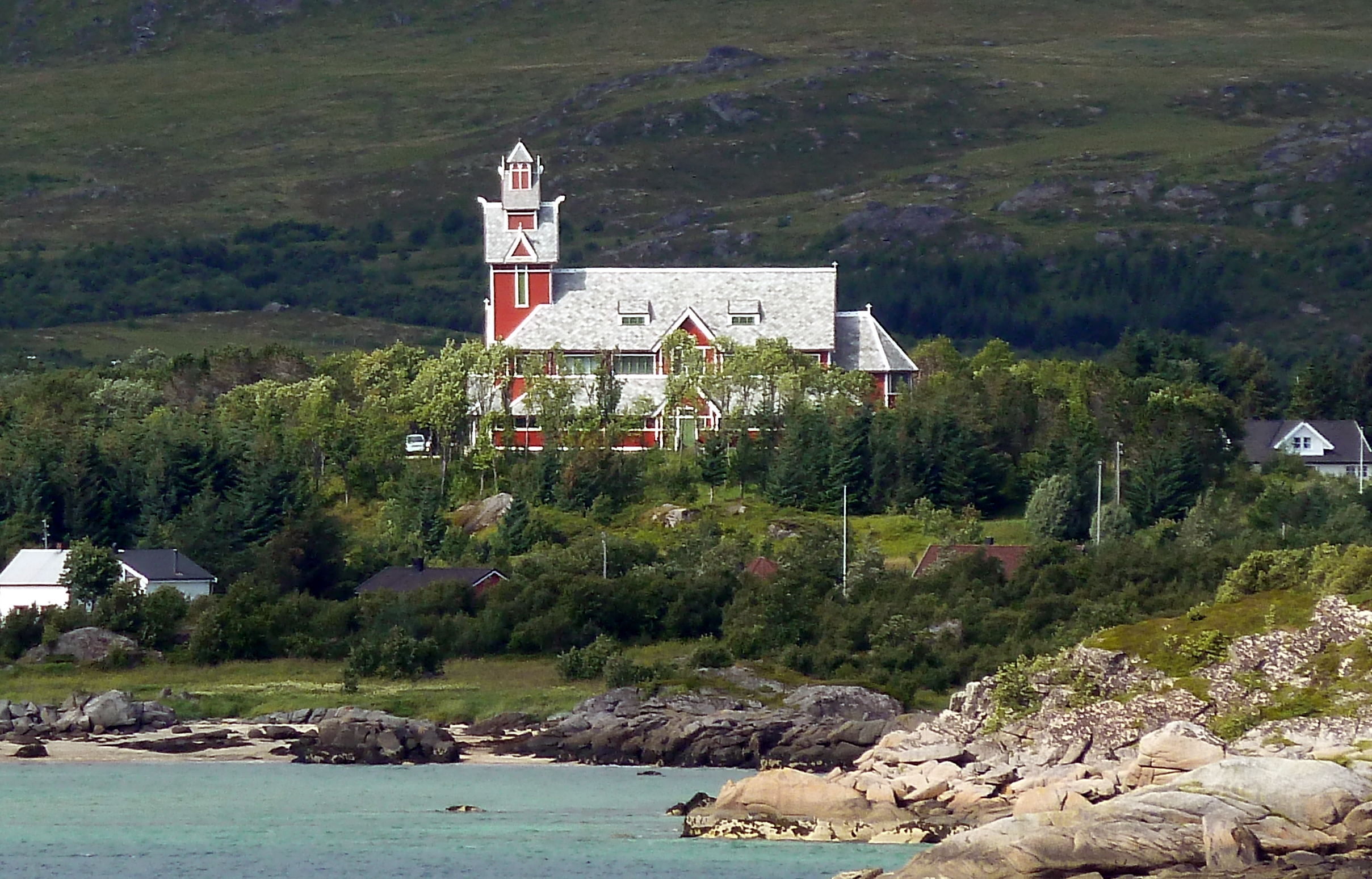

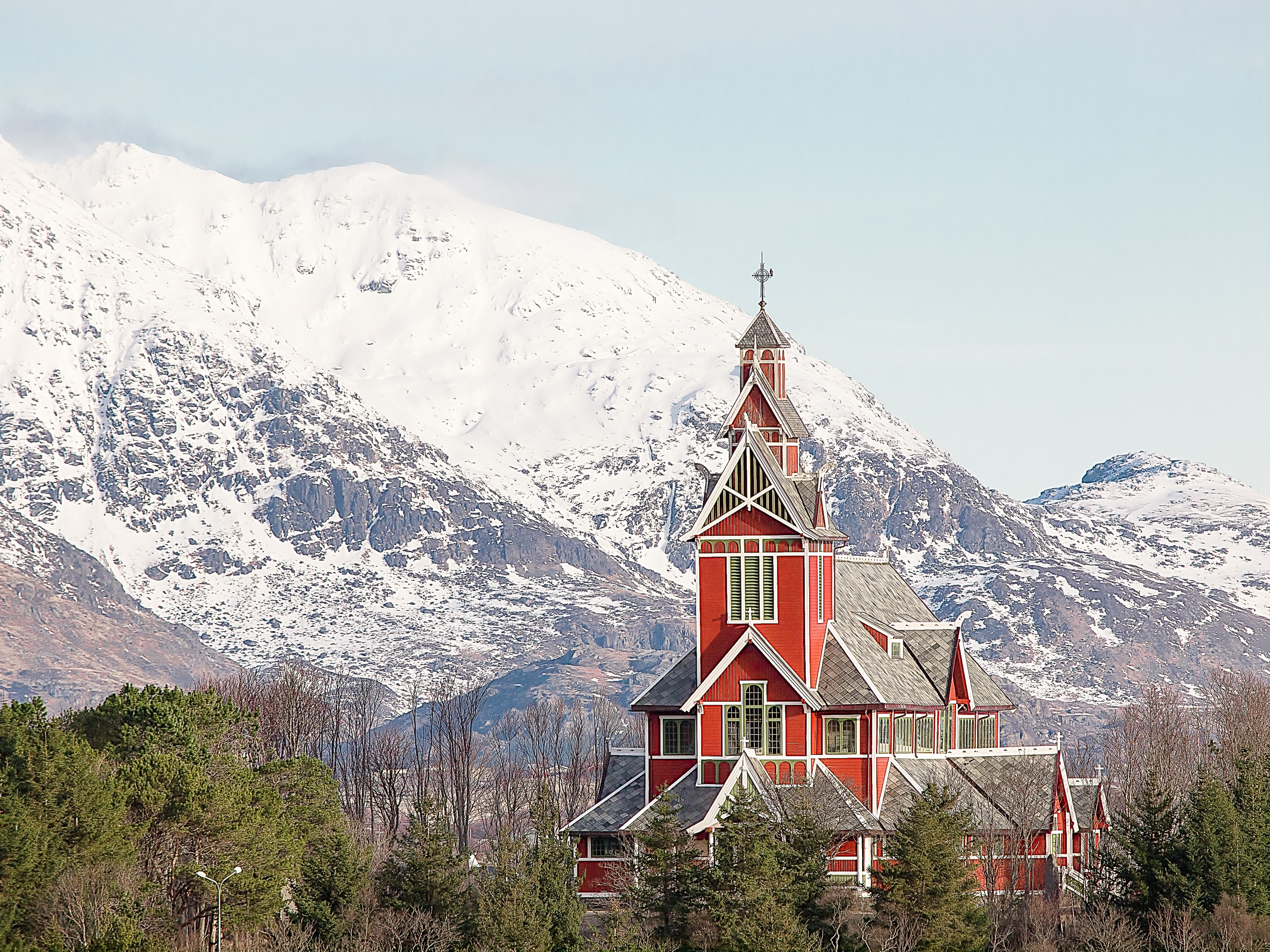

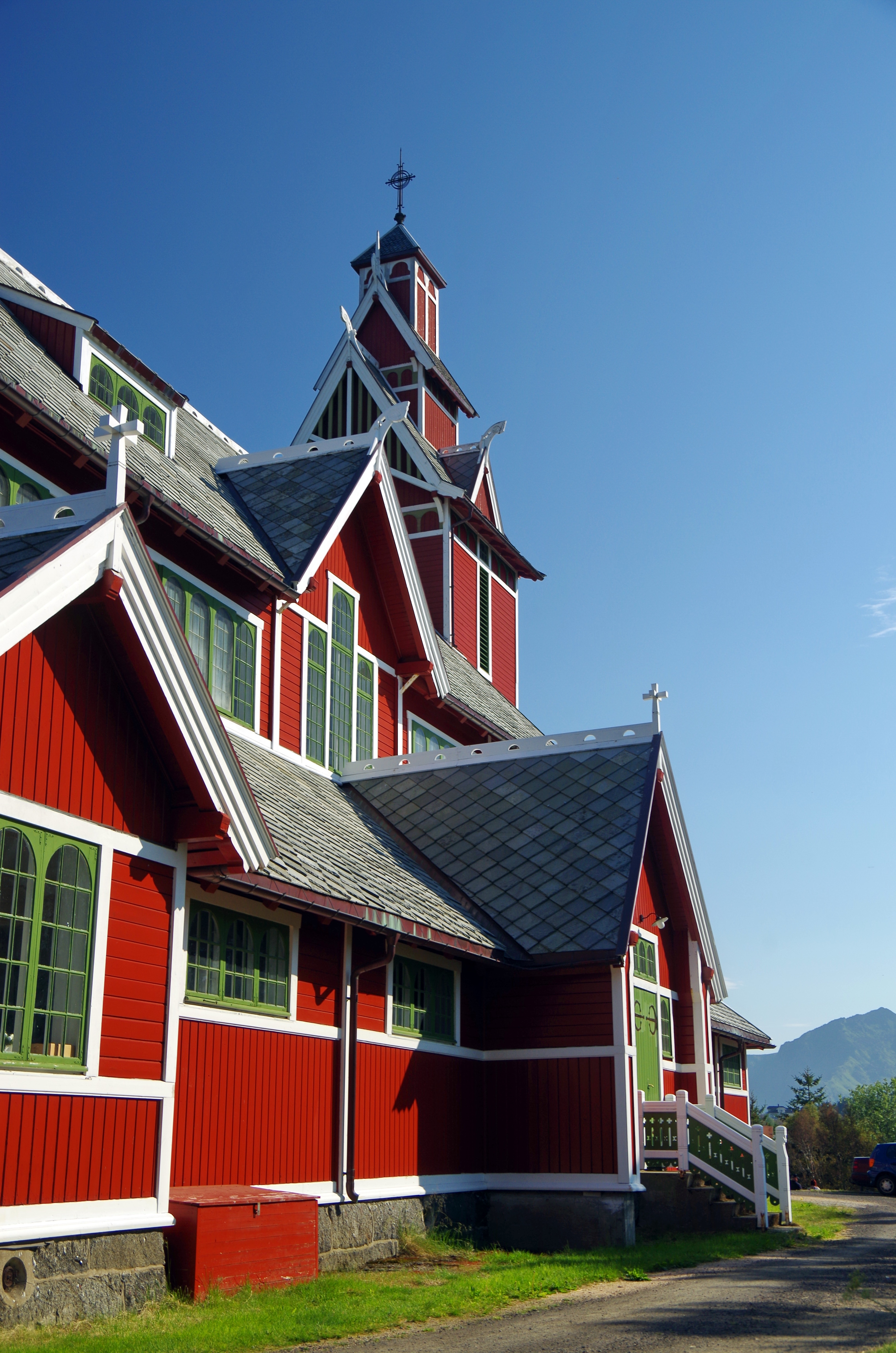

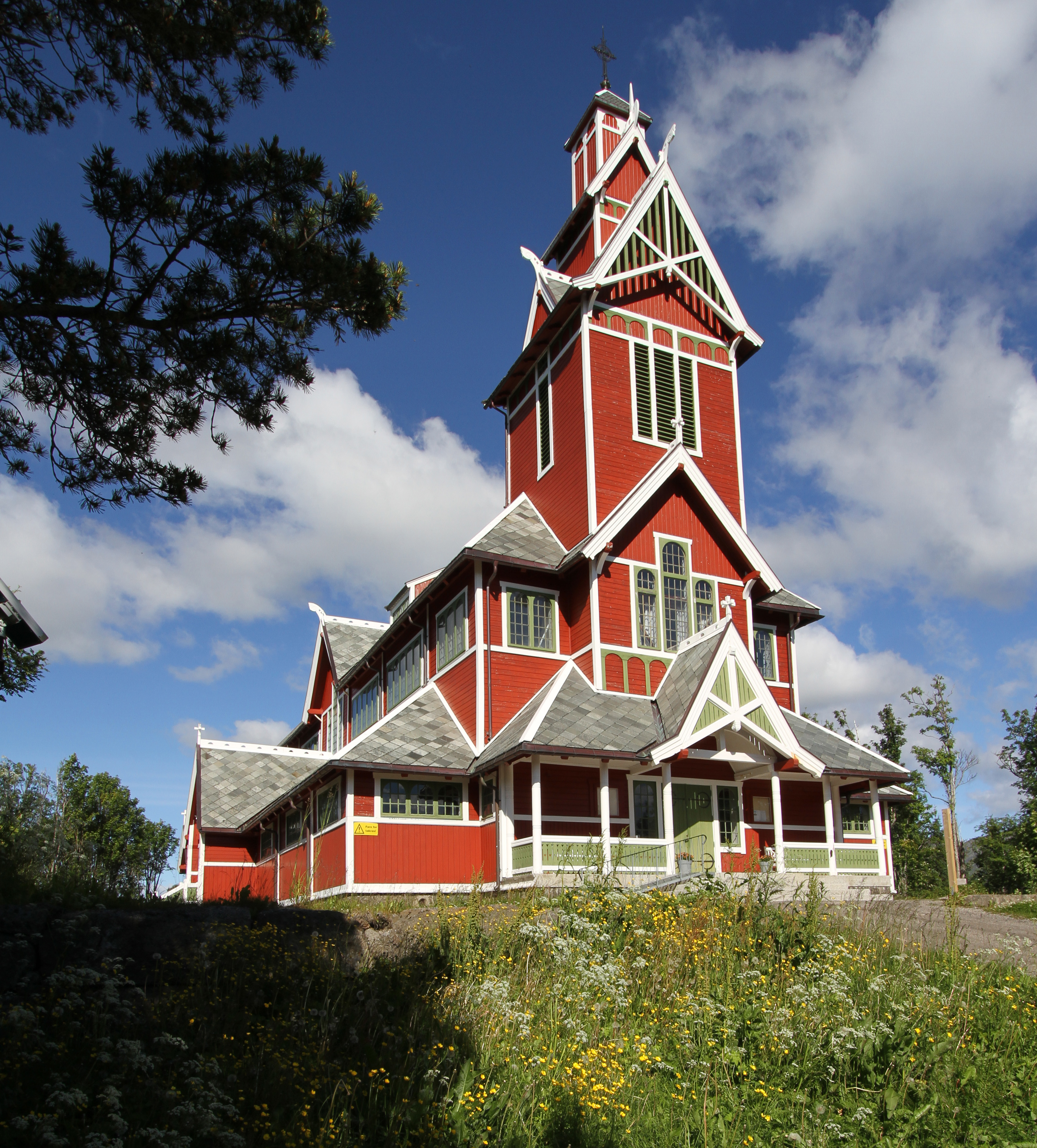

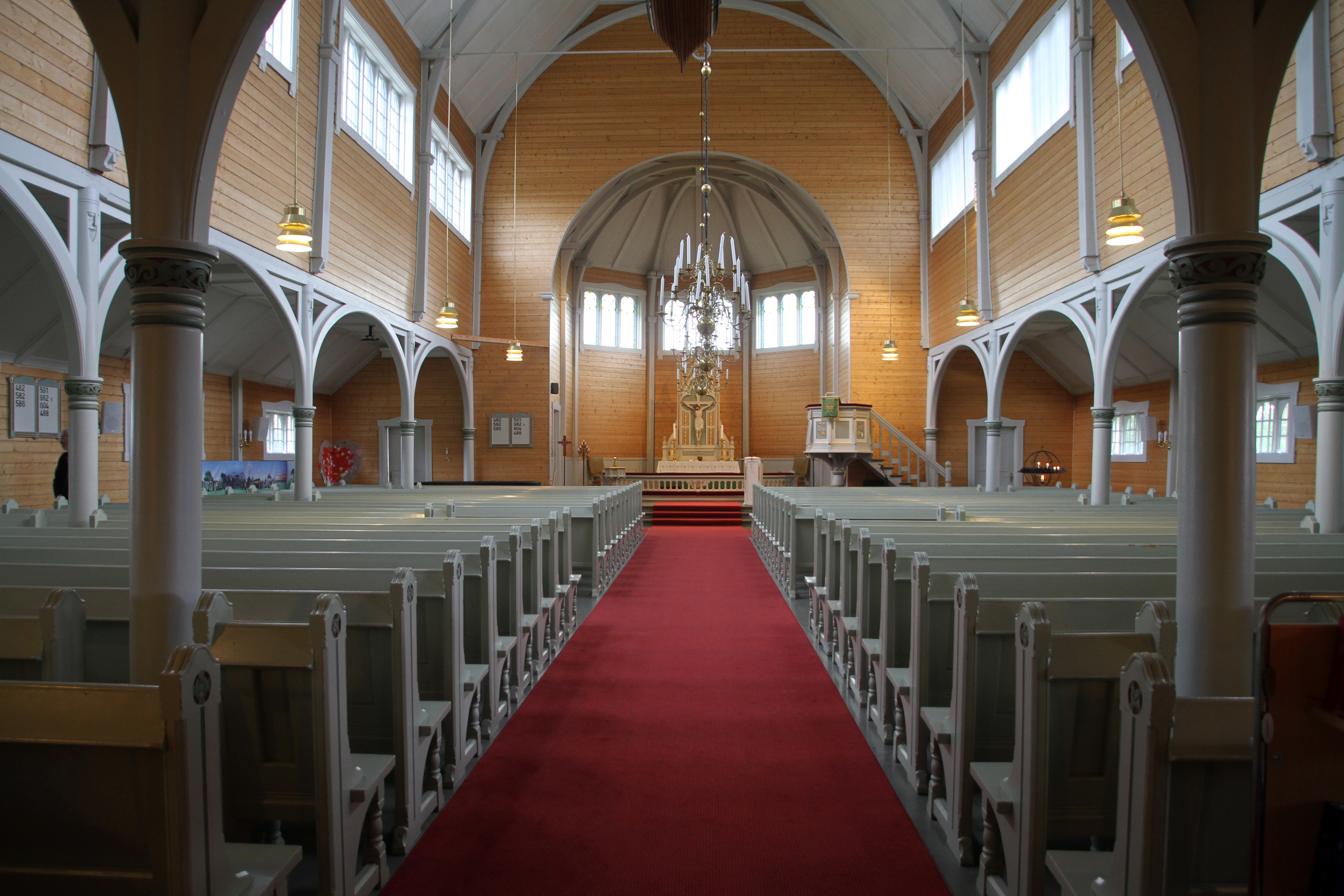

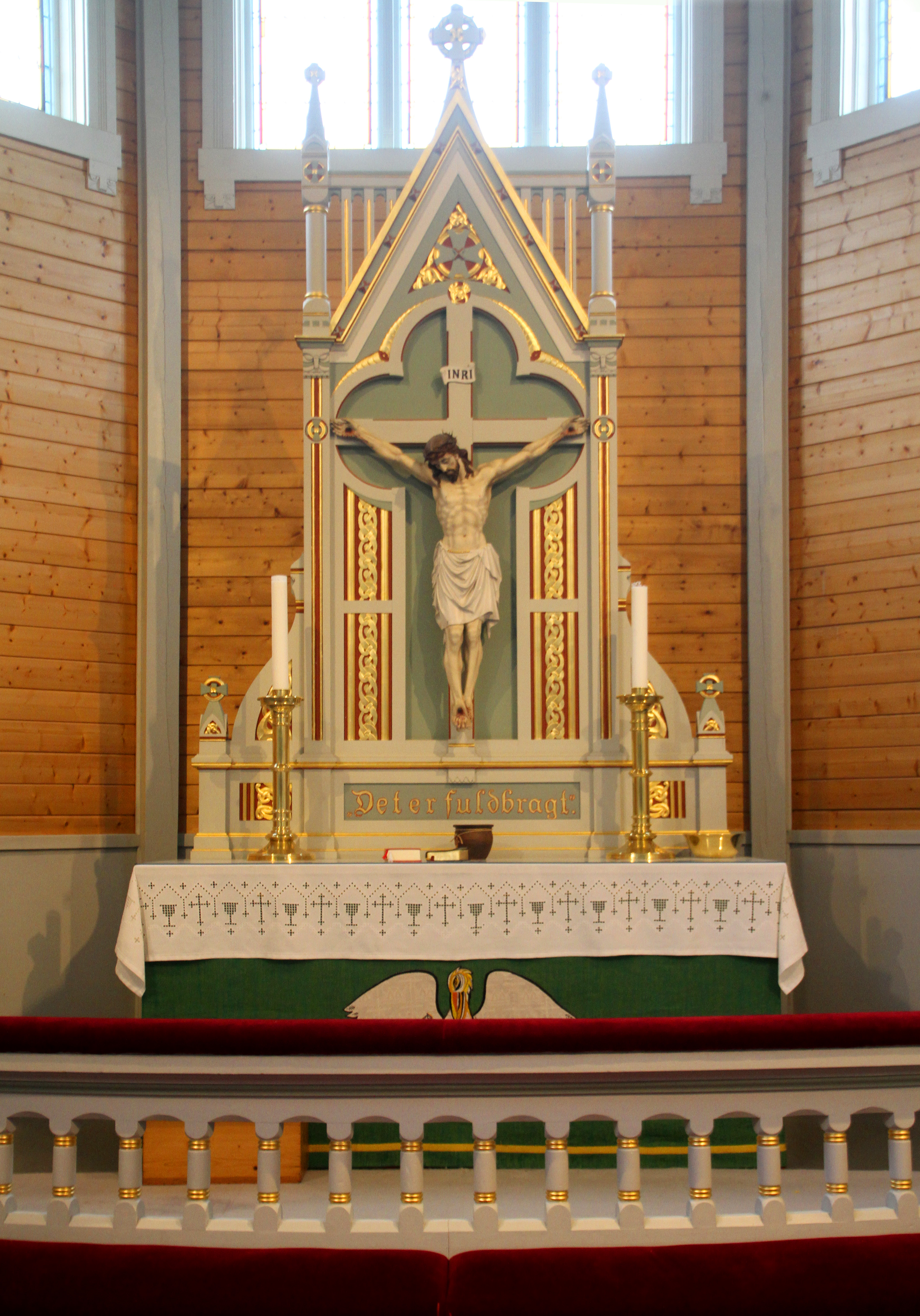

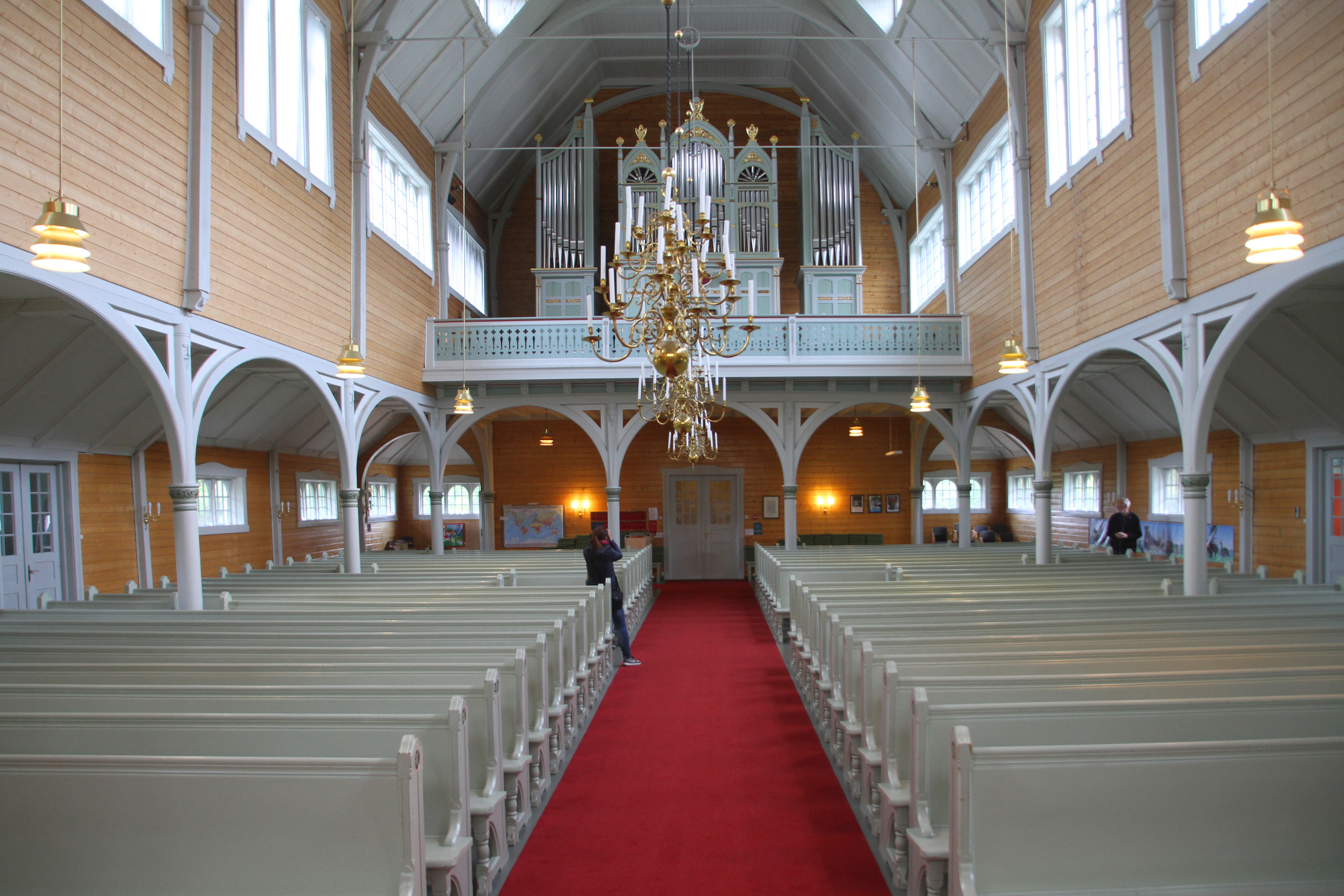

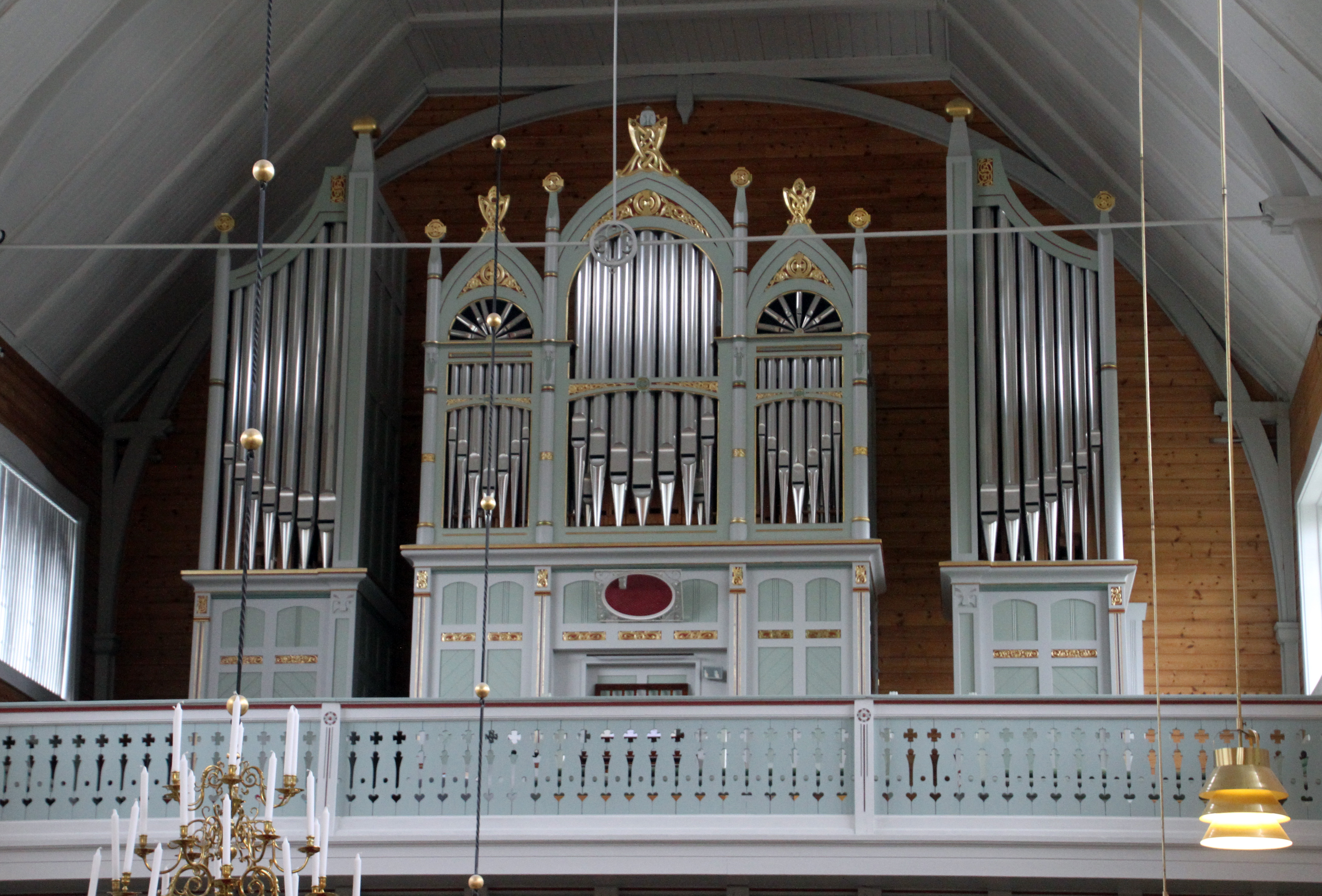

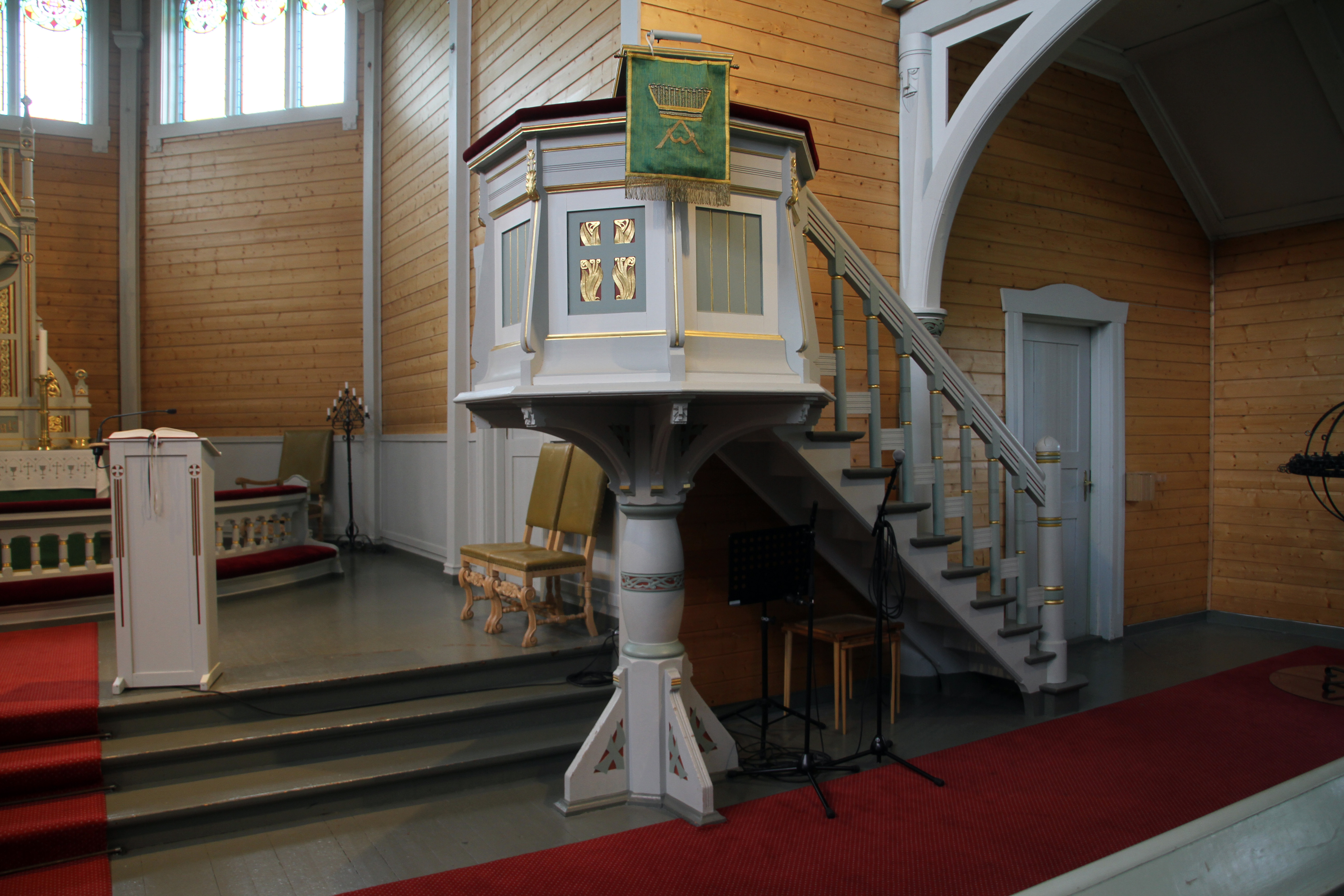

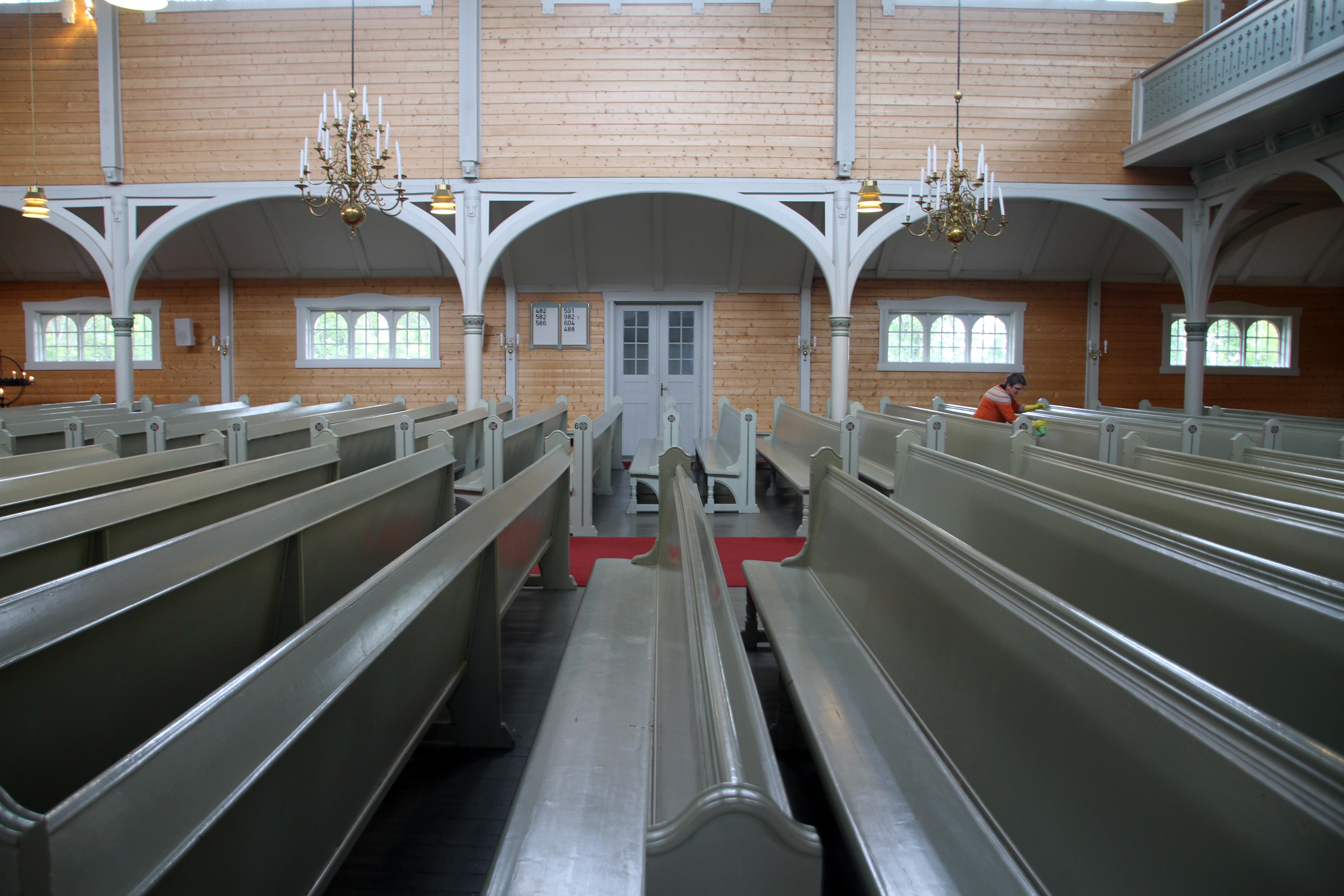

== See also ==
- List of churches in Sør-Hålogaland
