= Skottinden =

Mountain in Nordland, Norway

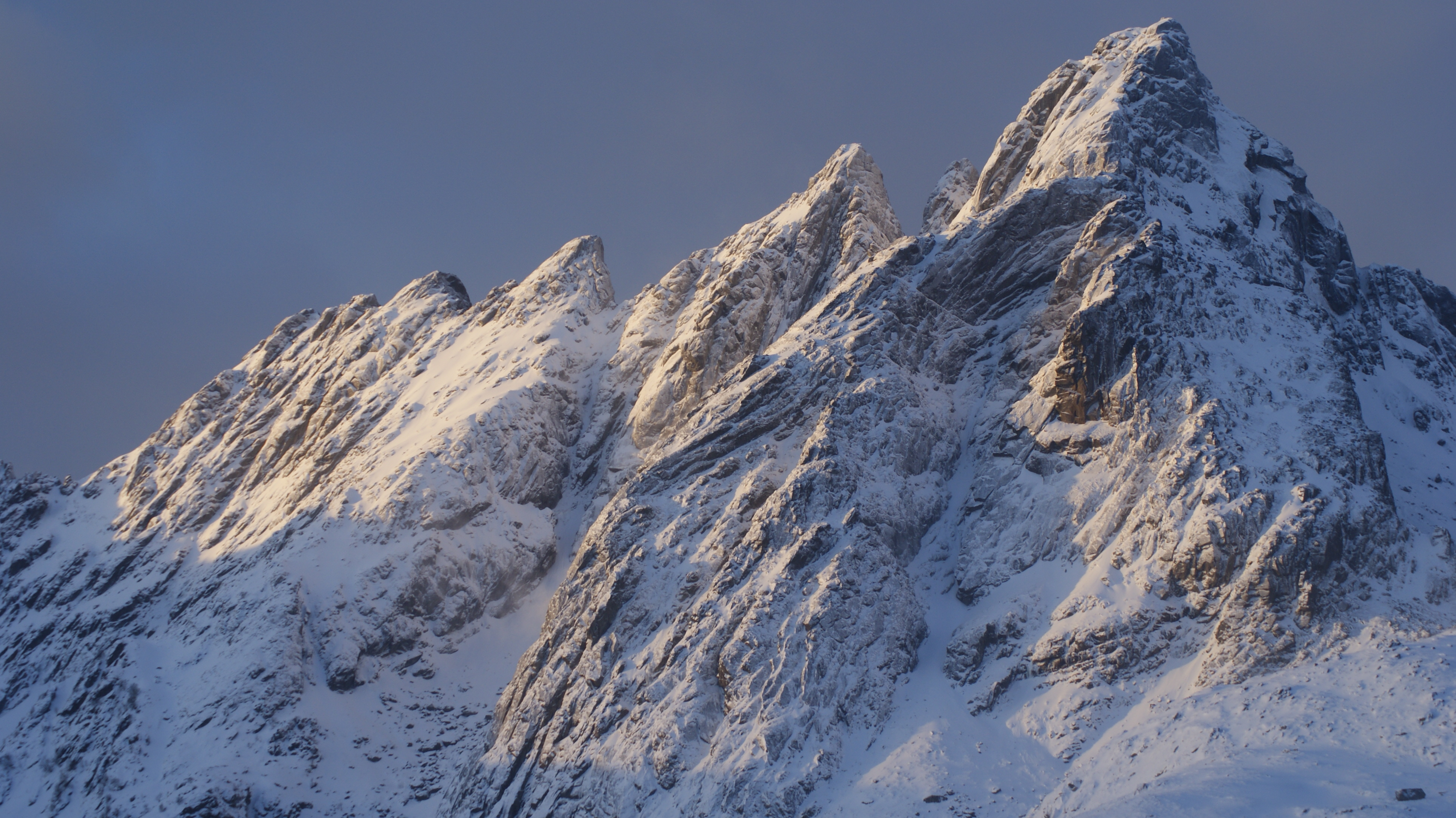
- Skottinden on Vestvågøya

Highest point
- Elevation: 671 m (2,201 ft)
- Prominence: 663 m (2,175 ft)
- Coordinates: 68°04′54″N 13°29′32″E

Geography
- Interactive map of the mountain
- Location: Vestvågøy, Nordland, Norway
- Topo map: 1031-II Leknes

Skottinden is a mountain in the Lofoten archipelago, in Nordland county, Norway. It is located on the southwestern part of the island of Vestvågøya in Vestvågøy Municipality. The 671-metre (2,201 ft) tall mountain is situated about 2 kilometres (1.2 mi) northwest of the village of Ballstad and about 1 kilometre (0.62 mi) east of the Nappstraumen strait separating the islands of Vestvågøya and Flakstadøya.

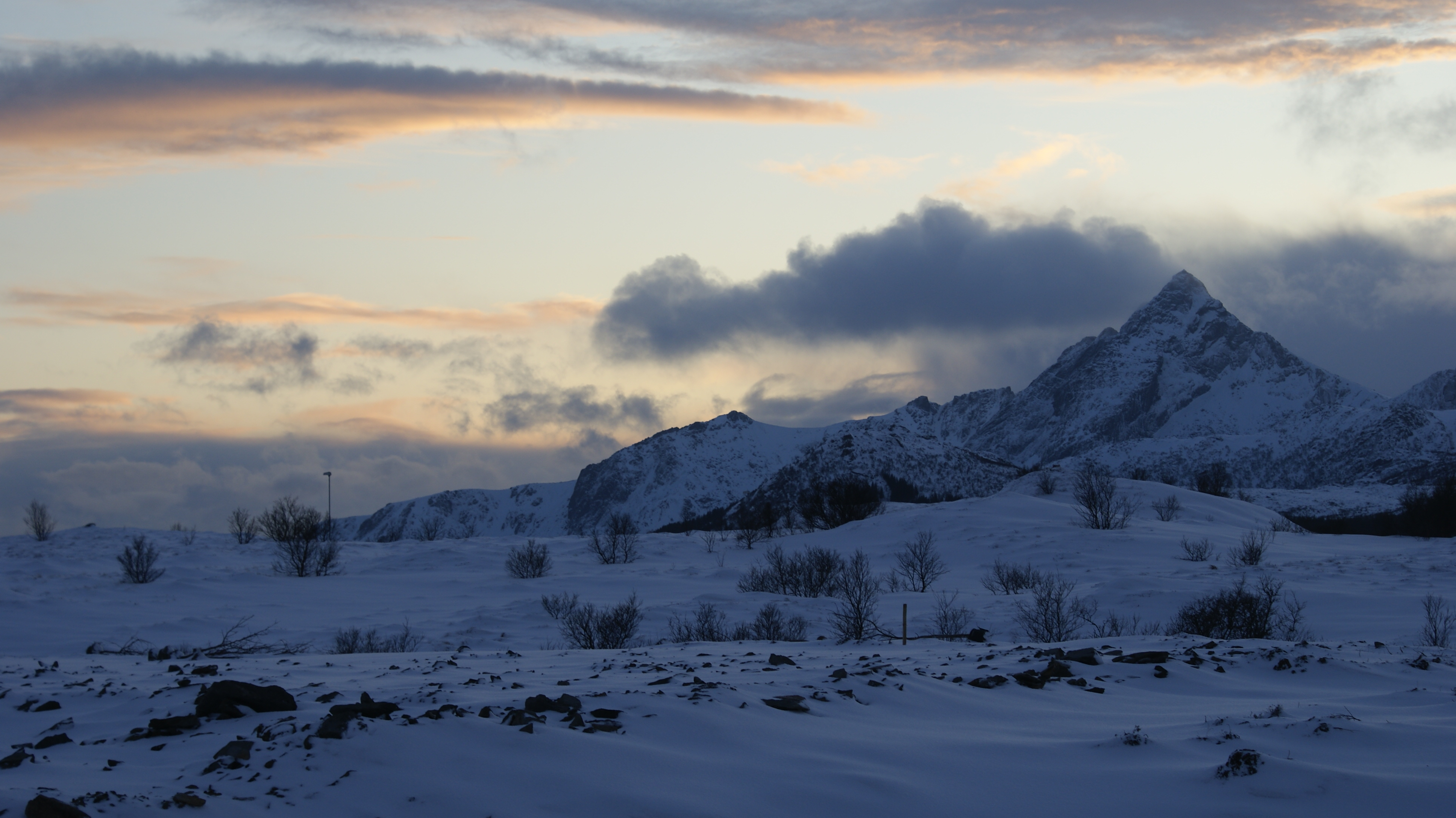
Skottinden from Storeid near Leknes, from the northeast

The southern ridge of Skottinden has several lesser summits: Sengestokken, Blåtinden, and Munkan.
