= Ballstad =

Village in Vestvågøy Municipality, Norway

- Village
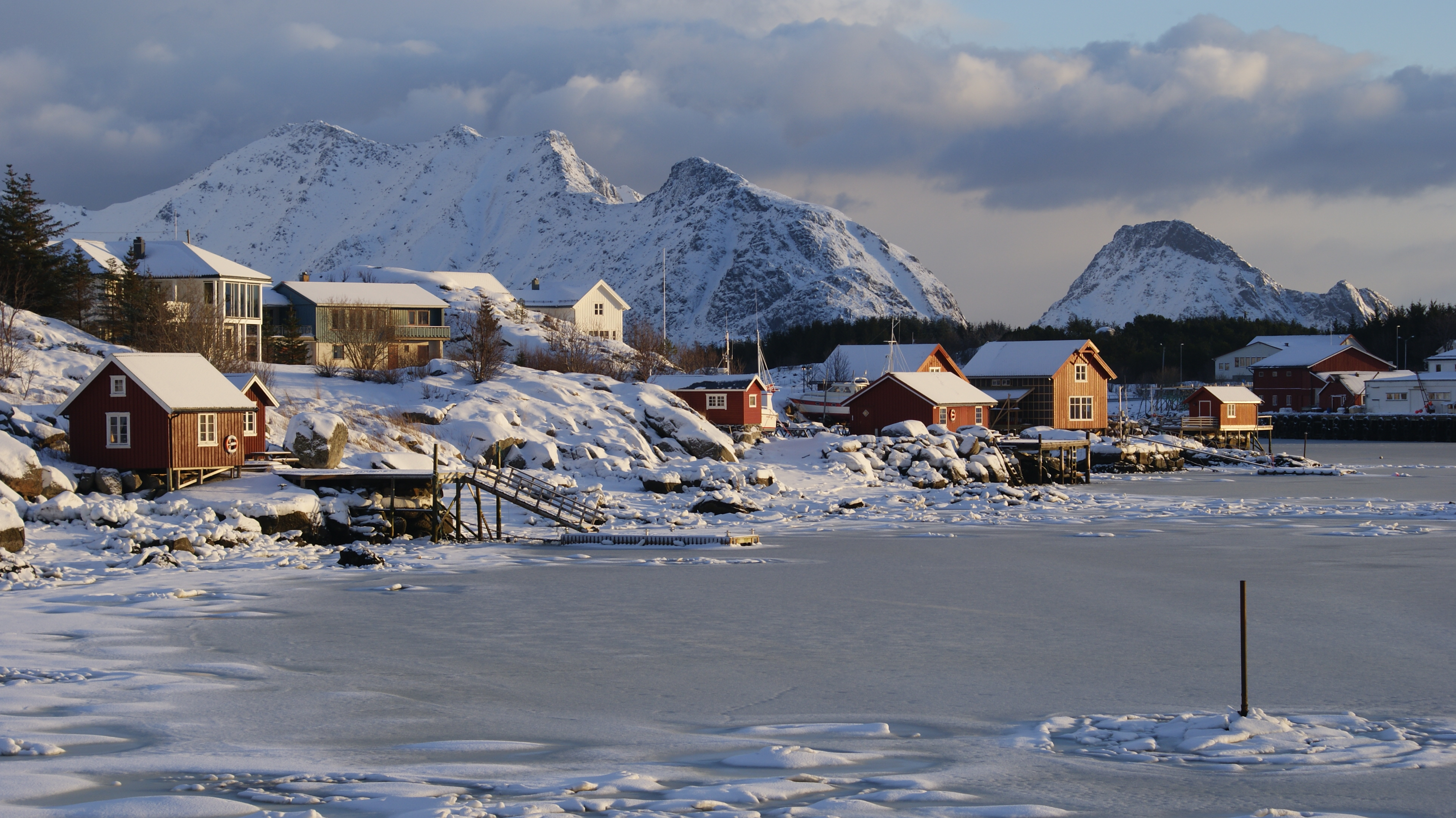
- View of the village in the winter
- Interactive map of Ballstad
- Location within Nordland Location within Norway
- Coordinates: 68.0743°N 13.5451°E
- Country: Norway
- Region: Northern Norway
- County: Nordland
- District: Lofoten
- Municipality: Vestvågøy Municipality

Area
  - Total: 0.78 km^{2} (0.30 sq mi)
- Elevation: 9 m (30 ft)

Population (2023)
  - Total: 848
  - Density: 1,087/km^{2} (2,820/sq mi)
- Time zone: UTC+01:00 (CET)
  - Summer (DST): UTC+02:00 (CEST)
- Post Code: 8373 Ballstad

Ballstad is a village in Vestvågøy Municipality in Nordland county, Norway. It is located on a small island off the southwestern tip of the island of Vestvågøya in the Lofoten archipelago. It is one of the largest fishing villages in Lofoten.

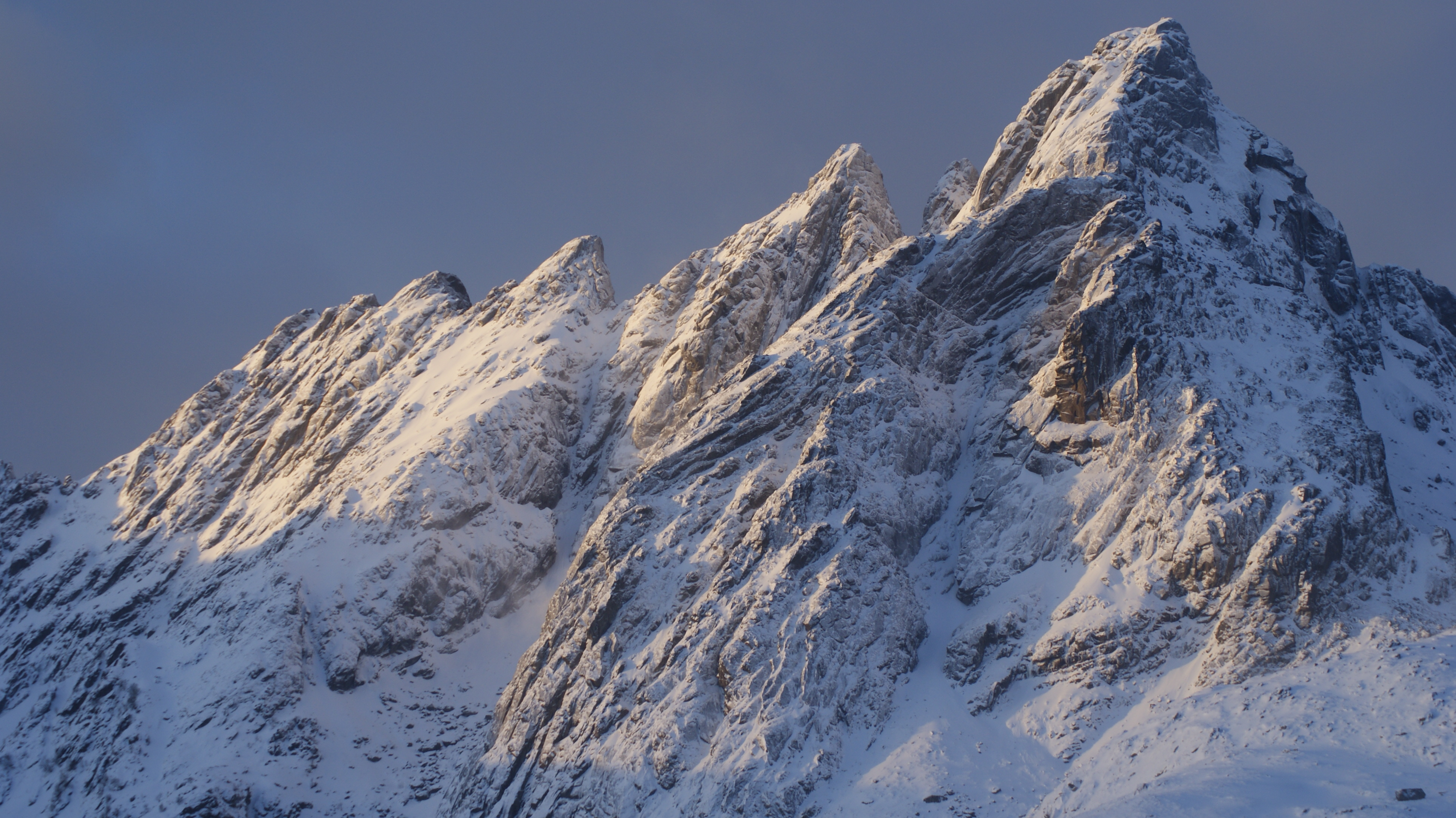
Skottinden dominates over Ballstad

Ballstad is a coastal village situated near the mouth of Buksnesfjorden, where it meets Vestfjorden. The mountain Skottinden lies just west of the village and the village of Gravdal lies about 5 kilometres (3.1 mi) to the north and the town of Leknes lies just north of Gravdal.

The 0.78-square-kilometre (190-acre) village has a population (2023) of 848 and a population density of 1,087 inhabitants per square kilometre (2,820/sq mi).
