= Henningsvær =

Village in Vågan Municipality, Norway

- Village
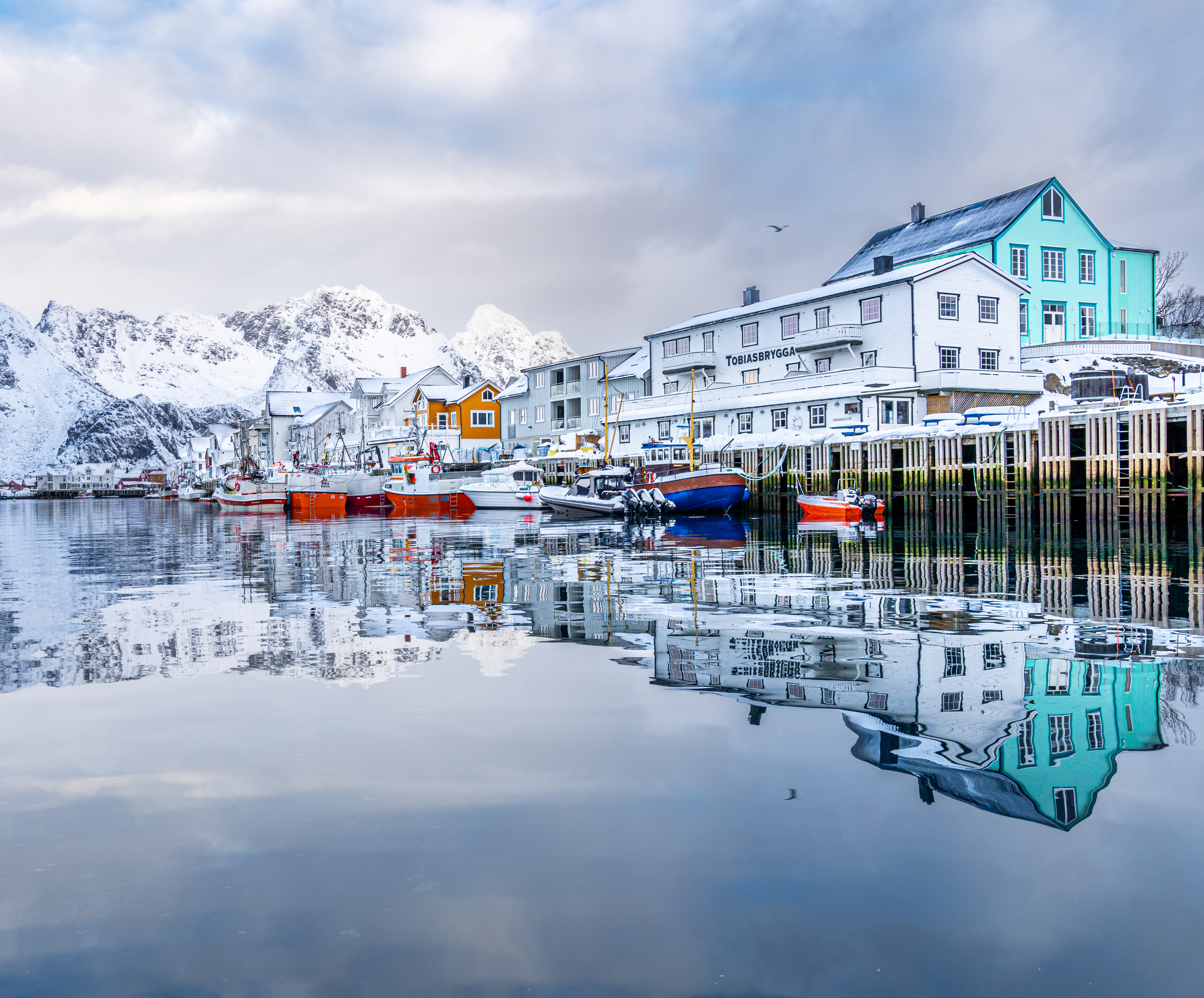
- Henningsvær marina buildings
- Interactive map of Henningsvær
- Location within Nordland Location within Norway
- Coordinates: 68.1529°N 14.2008°E
- Country: Norway
- Region: Northern Norway
- County: Nordland
- District: Lofoten
- Municipality: Vågan Municipality

Area
  - Total: 0.3 km^{2} (0.12 sq mi)
- Elevation: 6 m (20 ft)

Population (2023)
  - Total: 507
  - Density: 1,690/km^{2} (4,400/sq mi)
- Time zone: UTC+01:00 (CET)
  - Summer (DST): UTC+02:00 (CEST)
- Post Code: 8312 Henningsvær

Henningsvær is a fishing village in Vågan Municipality in Nordland county, Norway. It is located on several small islands off the southern coast of the large island of Austvågøya in the Lofoten archipelago. The village is located about 20 kilometres (12 mi) southwest of the town of Svolvær. Henningsvær is connected to the rest of Vågan via the Henningsvær Bridges. The village is mostly located on the islands of Heimøya and Hellandsøya.

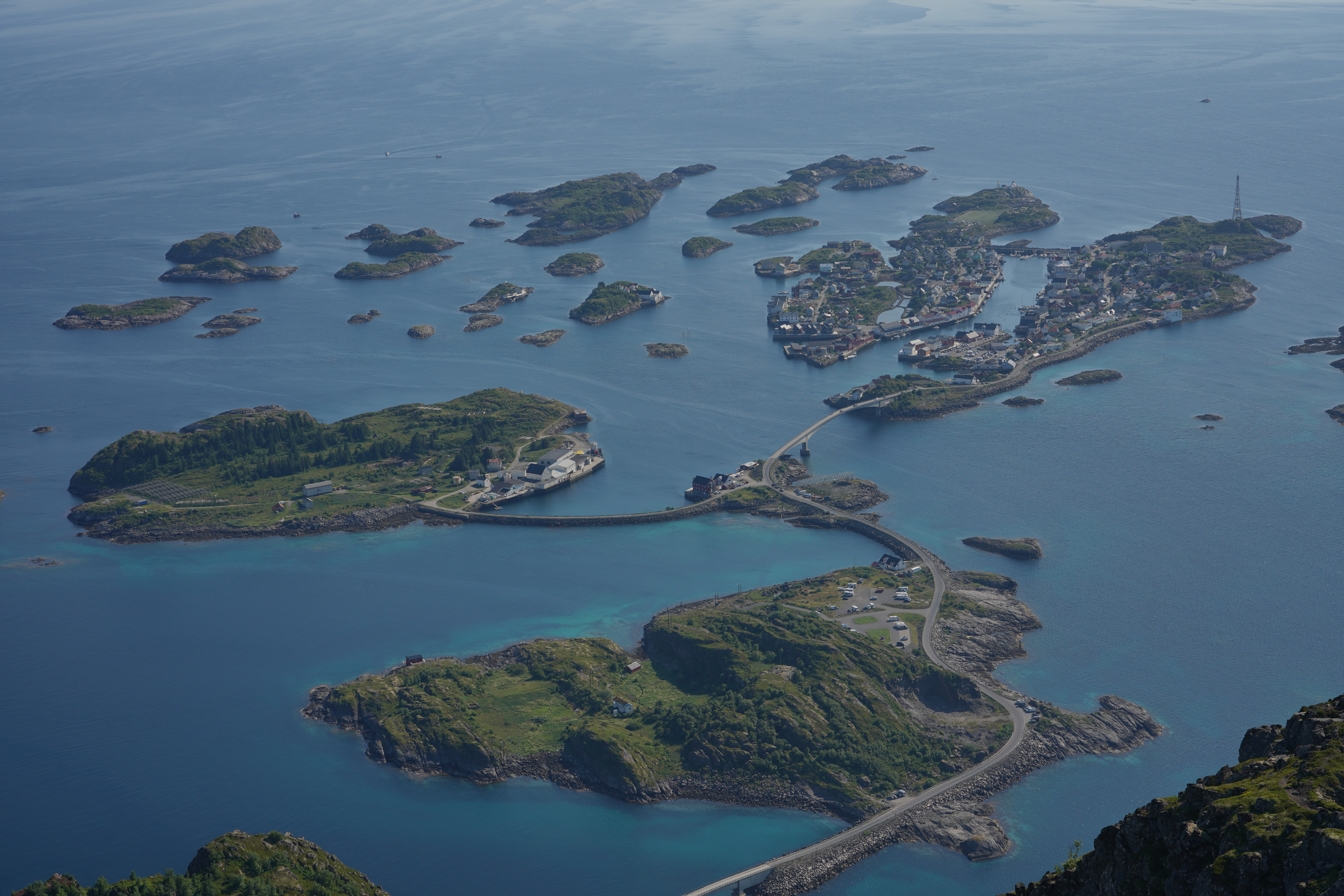
Aerial view of Henningsvær

The 0.3-square-kilometre (74-acre) village has a population (2023) of 507 and a population density of 1,690 inhabitants per square kilometre (4,400/sq mi). Due to its traditional fishing village architecture, Henningsvær draws many tourists. Climbing and diving/snorkeling are also popular tourist activities. Henningsvær Church is located in the village, on the island of Heimøya.

With the increase in professional and consumer drone photography in the second decade of the 2000s, the Henningsvaer Fotballbanen (football pitch) has gained global attention. The European football organisation, UEFA, filmed on and around the field for their "We Play Strong" video with Liv Cooke. Pepsi Max Norge offered their support for the UEFA Champions League Final in 2018 with an art installation created by children kicking footballs covered in paint. The field is managed by Henningsvaer IL football club under the leadership of Ole Johan Wiik, as of 2018.

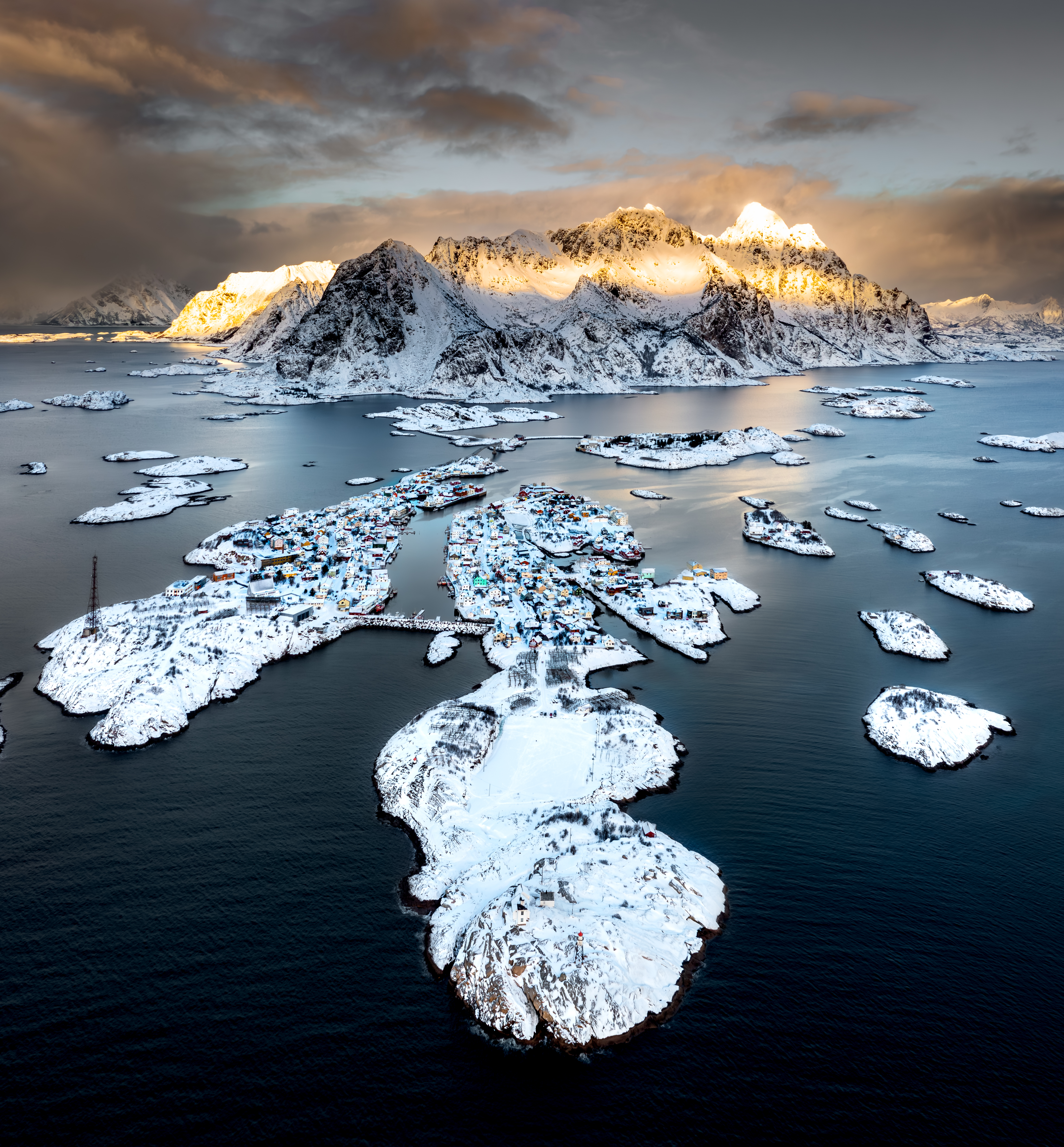
Henningsvær and the surrounding islands.

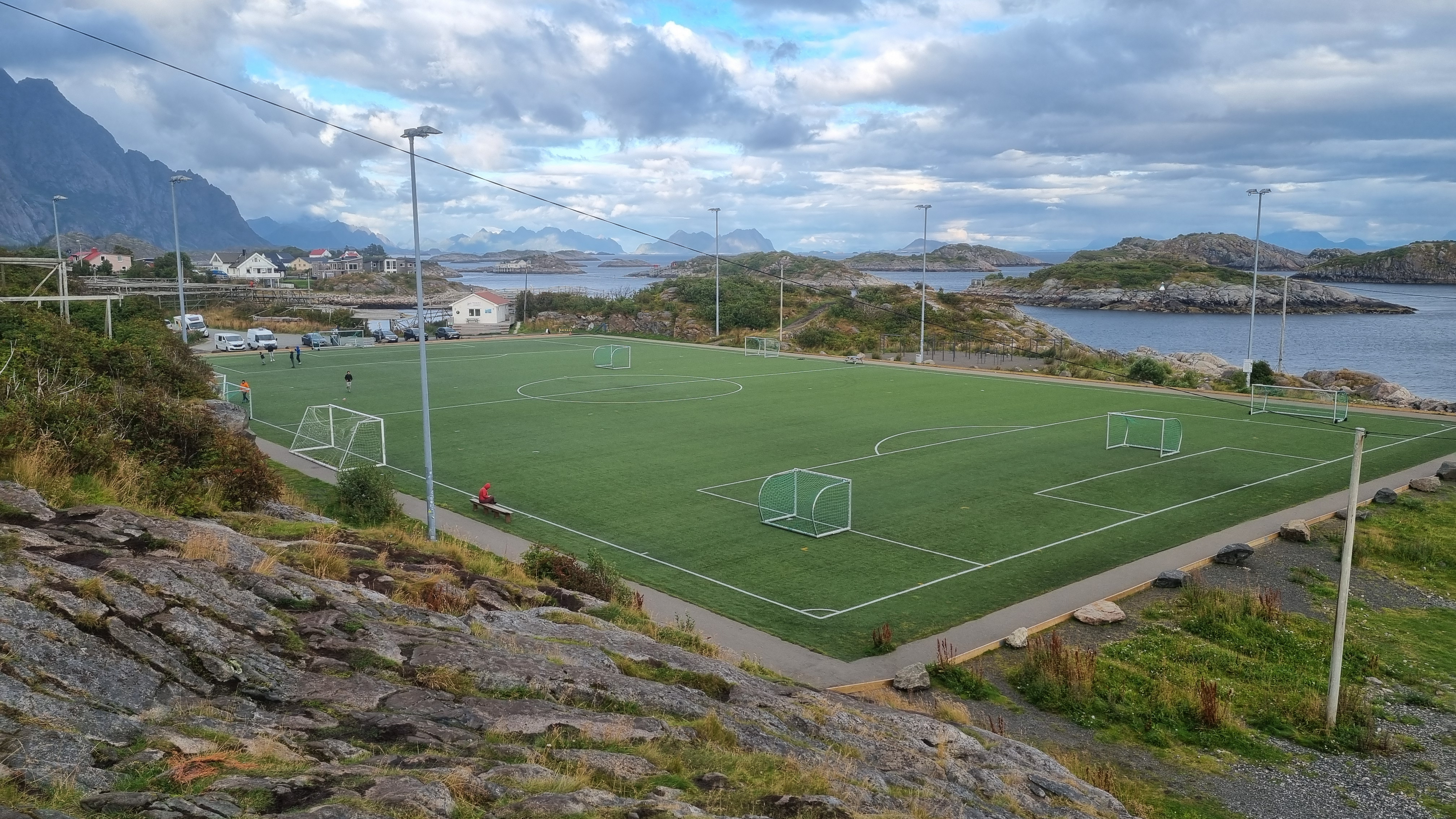
Henningsvær Stadion, looking northeast

== Name ==
The first element is the male name "Henning". The last element is vær which means 'fishing village'. The name is first recorded in 1567.
