= Lofoten Vortex =

Physical oceanographic feature

Mean eddy kinetic energy (EKE) profile in the Lofoten basin during July 2000. The red arrows represent the mean geostrophic currents during the same month.

The Lofoten Vortex, also called Lofoten Basin Vortex or Lofoten Basin Eddy, is a permanent oceanic anticyclonic eddy, located in the northern part of the Norwegian Sea, off the coast of the Lofoten archipelago. It was documented for the first time in the 1970s.

Due to the presence of the permanent vortex, the Lofoten basin features a localised area with high levels of sea surface temperature and eddy kinetic energy. The local currents inside the vortex and the strong convection observed during winter generate a hot spot rich in nutrients, affecting the surrounding marine biology.

Moreover, due to its extraordinary persistence and location, the Lofoten Vortex is likely to influence dense water formation in the region.

== Physical properties ==
Bathymetry of the Nordic Seas, with iso depth contours and description of the main topographic features of the area.

The Lofoten Basin is a well-defined topographic depression of about 3250 m depth, situated between the Norwegian continental slope in the east, the Vøring Plateau and the Helgeland Ridge in the south and southwest, and the Mohn Ridge in the northwest. The complex bathymetric structure is pivotal to locate the two major ocean currents of the basin:

- the Norwegian Atlantic Slope Current (NwASC), which flows south-north all along the continental shelf of Norway;
- the Norwegian Atlantic Front Current (NwAFC), which streams almost parallel to the slope current, but down the west side of the Vøring Plateau and then along the Mohn Ridge.

These currents play a key role in the mechanisms that guarantee the persistence of the Lofoten Vortex.

The vortex has been localised in the deepest part of the Lofoten Basin. It is an apparent permanent anticyclonic eddy, whose persistence has been documented in the past years by shipborne, Seagliders and satellite measurements.

The estimated radius of the vortex is 15–20 km and presents a 1200 m thick core of Atlantic Water (warm and saline) swirling at velocities that reach 0.8 m/s at 600–800 m depth. The velocity structure is similar to a Rankine vortex, characterised by a slow, outward decrease in azimuthal velocities.

RAFOS floats trapped in the core of the Lofoten Vortex revealed that the vortex centre travelled 1850 km in 15 months, with an average drifting speed of 1 to 5 km/day, but with peaks reaching 15 km/day. From these measurements, a general downslope and counter-clockwise movement of the vortex around the deepest part of the Lofoten Basin is detected.

From salinity and temperature profiles it is possible to see that the internal hydrography of the vortex is characterised by a doubly convex lens structure. The doming isotherms, upward at around 200 m and downward at approximately 600 m depth, are visible in a vertical mean temperature profile. This structure reveals that the deep Lofoten Basin is a major convection site in the Nordic Seas, specifically in winter: inside the Lofoten Vortex, the Atlantic Water penetrates up to 800 m depth, much deeper than in any other location of the same sea.

Strong seasonality characterises the density profile of the vortex: during summer a double core structure is detectable, with a shallow pycnocline created by the stratification of surface water heated by the sun. On the other hand, in winter the surface's cooling creates strong convection that homogenises the density profile and deepens the pycnocline up to 1200 m depth.

== Surface signature and tracking ==
Mean sea level anomaly (SLA) in the Lofoten Basin during July 2000, with the mean currents also displayed as a quiver plot.The Lofoten Vortex is detectable as a bright spot of positive relative SLA between 3-5°E and 70°N, surrounded by anticyclonic swirling arrows.

The Lofoten Vortex has two surface features that are useful for its detection.

First, on a sea surface temperature (SST) map, the vortex is recognisable as a negative SST anomaly. The cold-core surface signature, however, cannot be consistently detected by satellites' records, therefore it is not usually addressed as a reliable tracking method.

Being an anticyclonic structure, the Lofoten Vortex can instead be analysed as a positive sea level anomaly (SLA). Satellites measuring SLA highlighted the persistent existence of the vortex in 83% of the available datasets, with a lifetime spanning from 90 days up to more than one year. The longest registered vortex lasted for two years, from May 2002 to April 2004.

It is necessary to point out that in the period between two identified vortices, it is uncertain if the vortex disappeared or was simply not detected. That could be the case when the vortex adopts a submesoscale structure, with a non-detectable SLA.

== Mechanisms sustaining the Lofoten Vortex ==
Two mechanism has been identified so far, both playing an important role in the formation and the sustainment of the Lofoten Vortex:

- Merging of smaller anticyclones generated by the NwASC.
- Wintertime convection.

Nordic Seas bathymetry and main currents. The NwAC is shown splitting in the NwAFC and NwASC. An approximate location of the Lofoten vortex is also marked.

=== Anticyclonic merging ===
==== Anticyclones' genesis region ====
The Lofoten vortex is situated in the deepest parts of the topographic depression of the Lofoten Basin. Due to the instabilities of the basin’s eastern boundary current (NwASC), cyclones and anticyclones are shed off from the east.

As shown by experiments in a rotating tank, cyclones climb upslope in an anticyclonic spiral relative to the centre of a seamount, and anticyclones will descend towards the centre of a bottom depression in a cyclonic spiral. Likewise, the anticyclones released from the Norwegian Atlantic Slope Current (NwASC) spiral counterclockwise towards the deepest part of the Lofoten Basin. Some of the anticyclones terminate within the basin, whilst the longer-lasting trajectories (of 3–6 months) are traced back to the slope region related to the elevated eddy kinetic energy.

The anticyclonic source region can be divided into two areas of generation, following different paths into the basin:

- The southernmost track lies right off the 3200 m isobath and follows a direct route into the basin;
- The other paths travel along curved trajectories and then move cyclonically along outer routes, roughly tracing the 3000 m isobath.

As the anticyclones from the northernmost-lying sources have a longer travel time, they are subject to seasonal variability and are exposed to longer cooling periods, leaving them denser (than the vortices taking the direct route from the boundary current).

When the boundary current is stronger, it is more unstable and will shed more eddies toward the west. In terms of seasonality, all the paths from the boundary current to the vortex show a maximum transport over the course of autumn and winter, with a maximum in January–February, and a minimum during spring and summer. Among the tracks, the one in the middle (between the southernmost and the northernmost source regions) has the maximum transport and yields a less pronounced seasonal variability. In the time-mean, a distinct maximum transport of approximately 2.5 Sv is found near 69.2° N.

==== Merging process ====
When the anticyclones have propagated southwestward from the east and into the trough of the Lofoten Basin, they establish a quasi-stationary vortex surrounded by cyclones and weaker anticyclones. These weaker anticyclonic vortices occasionally merge with the stronger Lofoten Vortex. The merging process is difficult to detect, but they are estimated to be 4-7 mergers a year with two seasonal peaks in late winter and in autumn, and a minimum in early winter.

During a merging event, a vertical alignment between the light core anticyclones and the denser Lofoten Vortex occurs, creating a double-core. The lighter vortices may encounter the Lofoten Vortex at various depths, but on lighter isopycnals. Over the course of an alignment, the core is subject to a massive vertical compression of about 100 m or more. In accordance with conservation of potential vorticity, there is a rapid and substantial increase in anticyclonic spin. The maximum increase in vorticity is often found at 600–700 m depth, indicating that the lower core is most frequently squeezed.

The negative vortices may also only partially merge. In this case, the core interacting with the Lofoten Vortex is situated on a shallower isopycnal. Moving closer to the Lofoten Vortex, a vertical alignment is initiated, but not completed. The cores have started to compress, but no connection between them is established. After separating again, the vortices are left intensified.

=== Wintertime convection ===
Meteorological events above the centre of the Lofoten Basin play a vital role in the development of deep wintertime convection that mixes water down to a mean wintertime mixing depth of 600 m. An inverse vertical distribution of salinity causes the sinking water to be warmer than the underlying one. This results in formation of a localised, vertically homogeneous, positive thermohaline anomaly in the intermediate and upper parts of the deep layer. The increase in the thermohaline anomaly in winter and spring is accompanied by the deepening and shrinking of the vortex to the Rossby radius of deformation of about 10 km. Conversely, the Lofoten Vortex expands to 5-7 times the Rossby radius of deformation during summer. Warming causes the doubly convex internal structure to “separate” from the surface, decreasing the depth of the lower convection boundary and increasing the horizontal scale of the vortex

== Effect on dense water formation ==
The Norwegian Atlantic Current (NwAC) is considered the northern branch of the Atlantic Meridional Overturning Circulation (AMOC). Its two limbs, the NwASC and the NwAFC, carry warm and saline Atlantic Water (AW) poleward to the Arctic Ocean.

Most of the dense water production in the Nordic Seas takes place on the east side of the Mohn Ridge system, in the Lofoten Basin. The AW, travelling northward, progressively loses heat to the atmosphere. Through the eddy activity of the Lofoten Basin and the persistence of the Lofoten Vortex, the residence time of the warm water is lengthened, leading to additional cooling of the AW before it reaches the Arctic Ocean. Due to heat loss, the temperature decreases and the light-to-dense water transformation takes place.

== See also ==
- Atlantic meridional overturning circulation
- Eddy (fluid dynamics)
- Lofoten
- Moskstraumen
- Nordic Seas
- Oceanic basin
- Vortex
