= Henningsvær Stadion =

Norwegian football venue

Coordinates: 68.1480°N 14.2007°E

Henningsvær Stadion is a football venue located in Henningsvær, a fishing village on one of the Lofoten islands, in Vågan Municipality, Nordland county, Norway. The ground, which has an artificial surface, is located at the southern end of the Hellandsøya island, with — on three sides — rocky outcrops between it and the surrounding Atlantic Ocean.

== History ==
Henningsvær Stadion has a capacity of around 500. Henningsvær Stadion and its clubhouse are regarded as a "hub" for the Henningsvær community, with local children training and playing there together. The venue is only used for amateur football. Henningsvær Stadion has gained attention from foreign media because of the surrounding view. As a result, the venue has been a tourist attraction. Foreign clubs, including from the United States, have played at the venue.

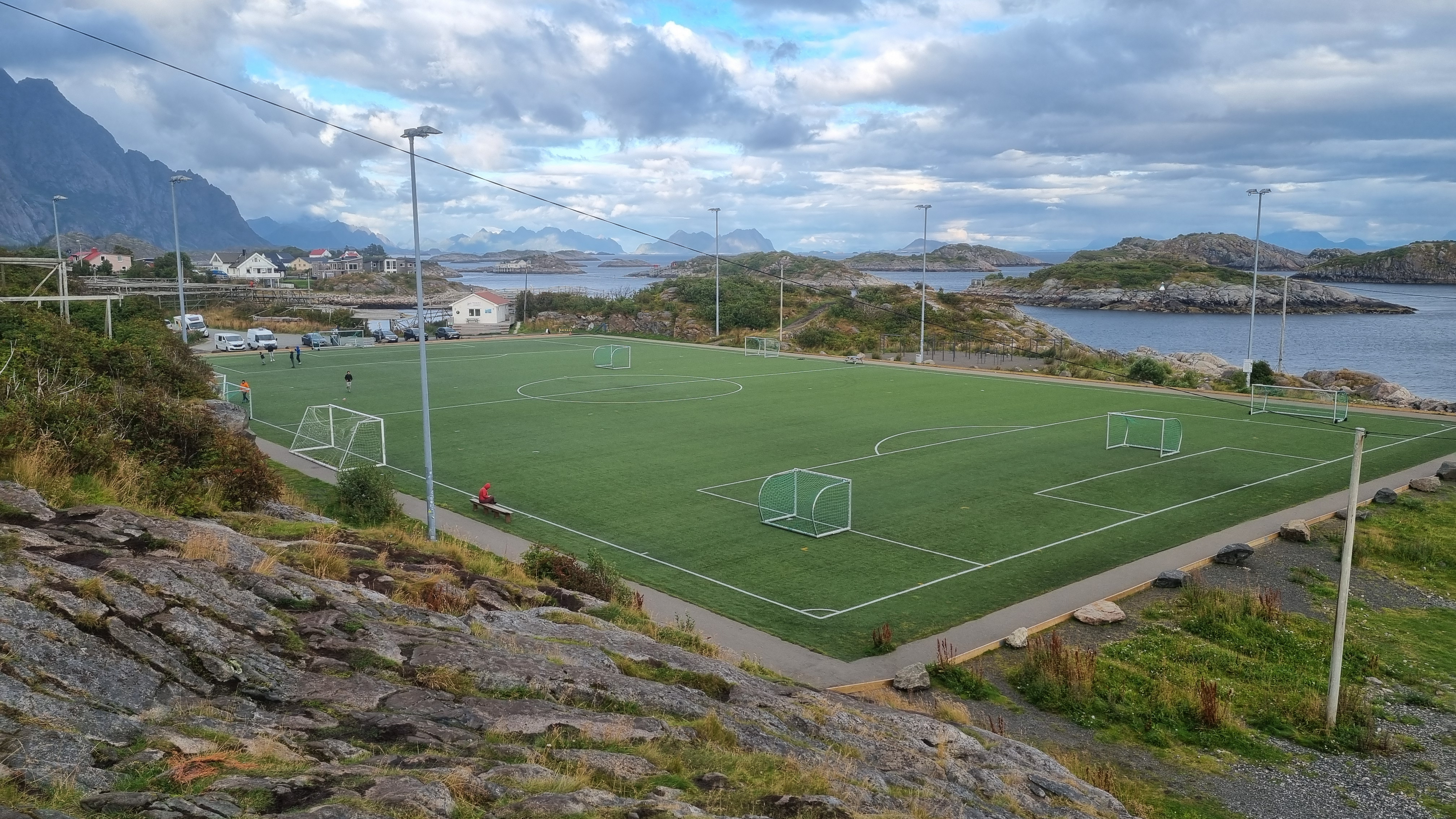
Henningsvær Stadion - looking northeast

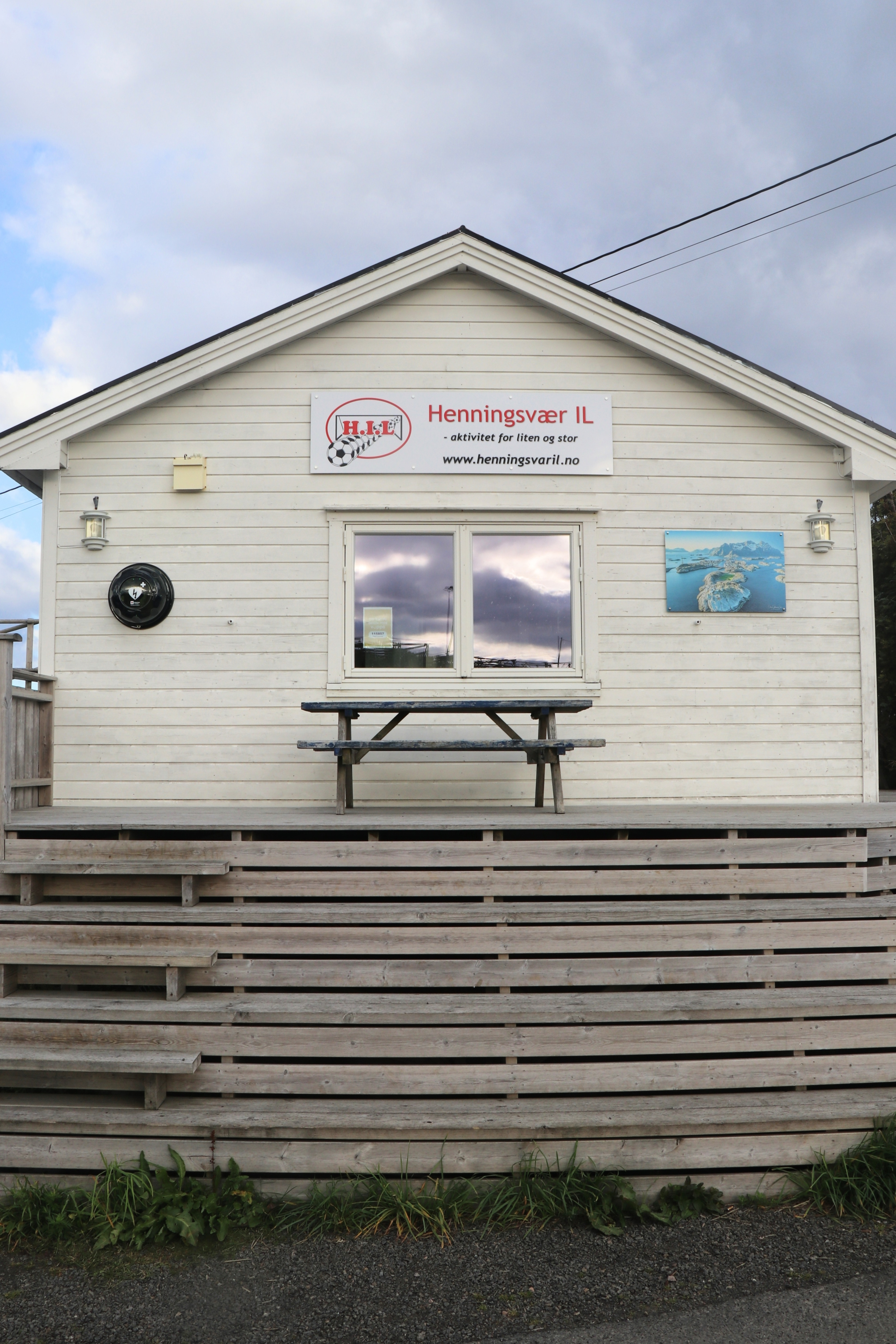
Sports club building at Henningsvær Stadion

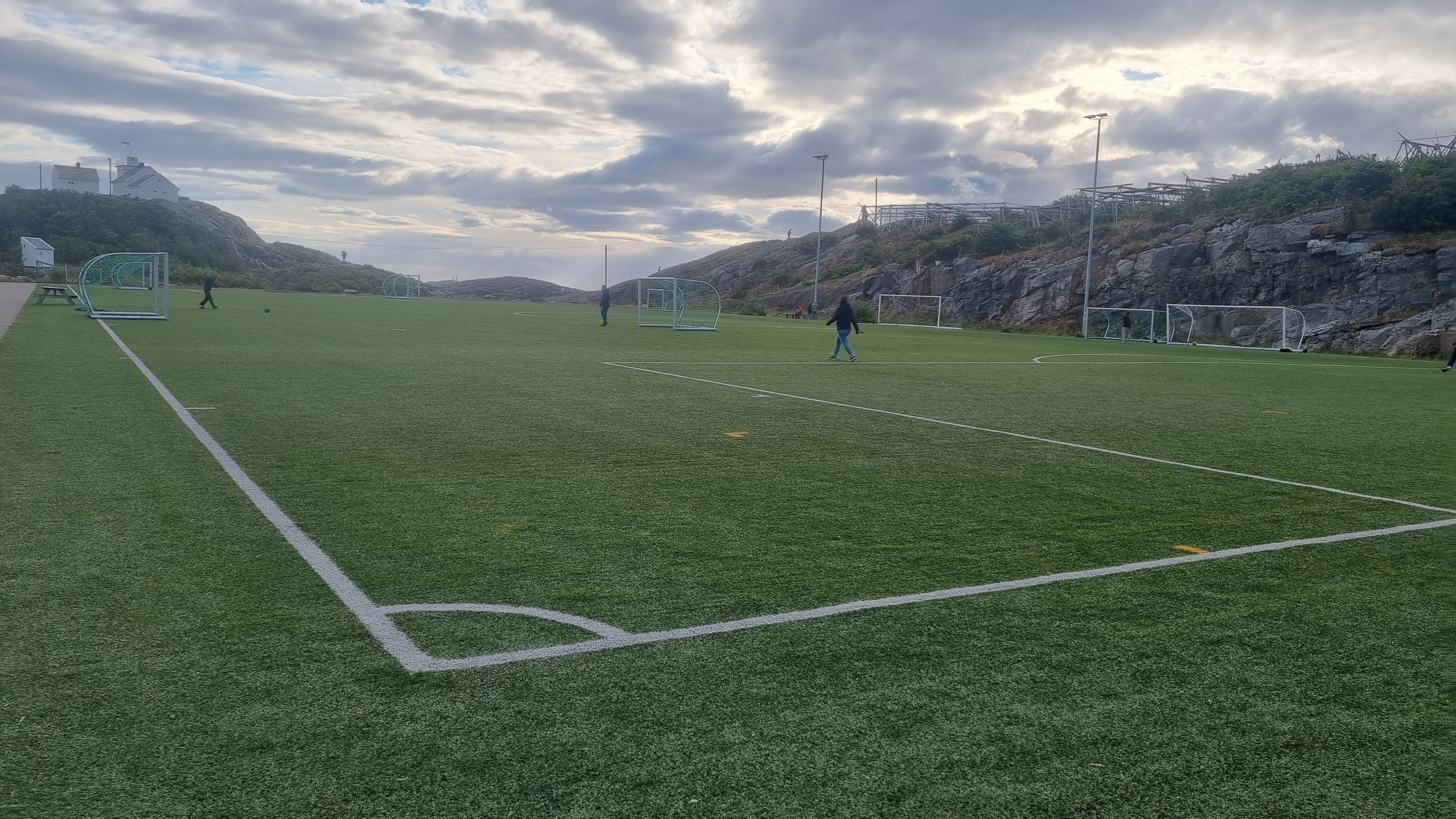
Henningsvær Stadion - looking southwest

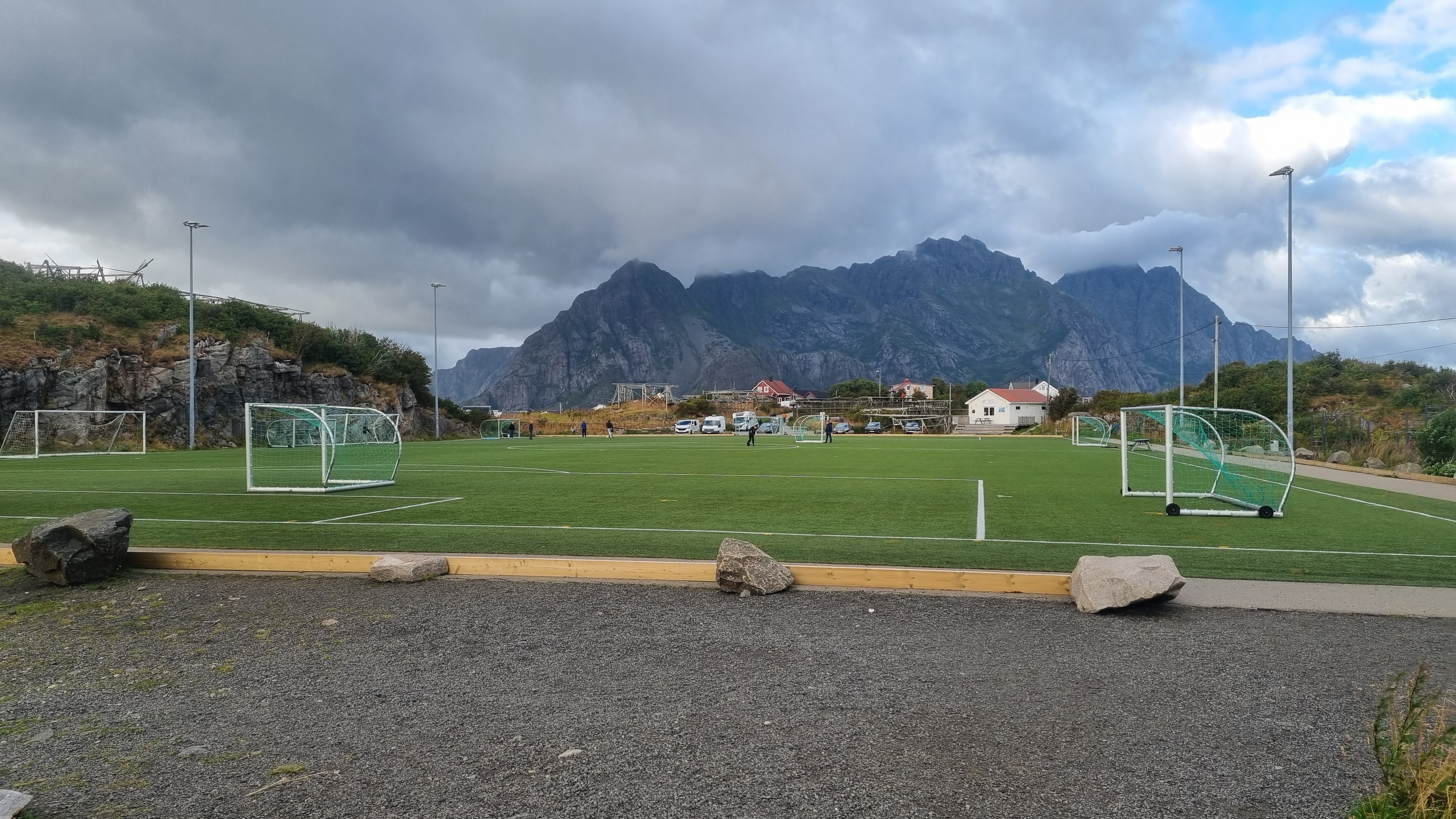
Henningsvær Stadion - looking north
