= Lofoten =

Archipelago and traditional district in Nordland, Norway

Native name: Lofoten (Norwegian); Lufoahtta (Lule Sami); Lufuohttá (Northern Sami)
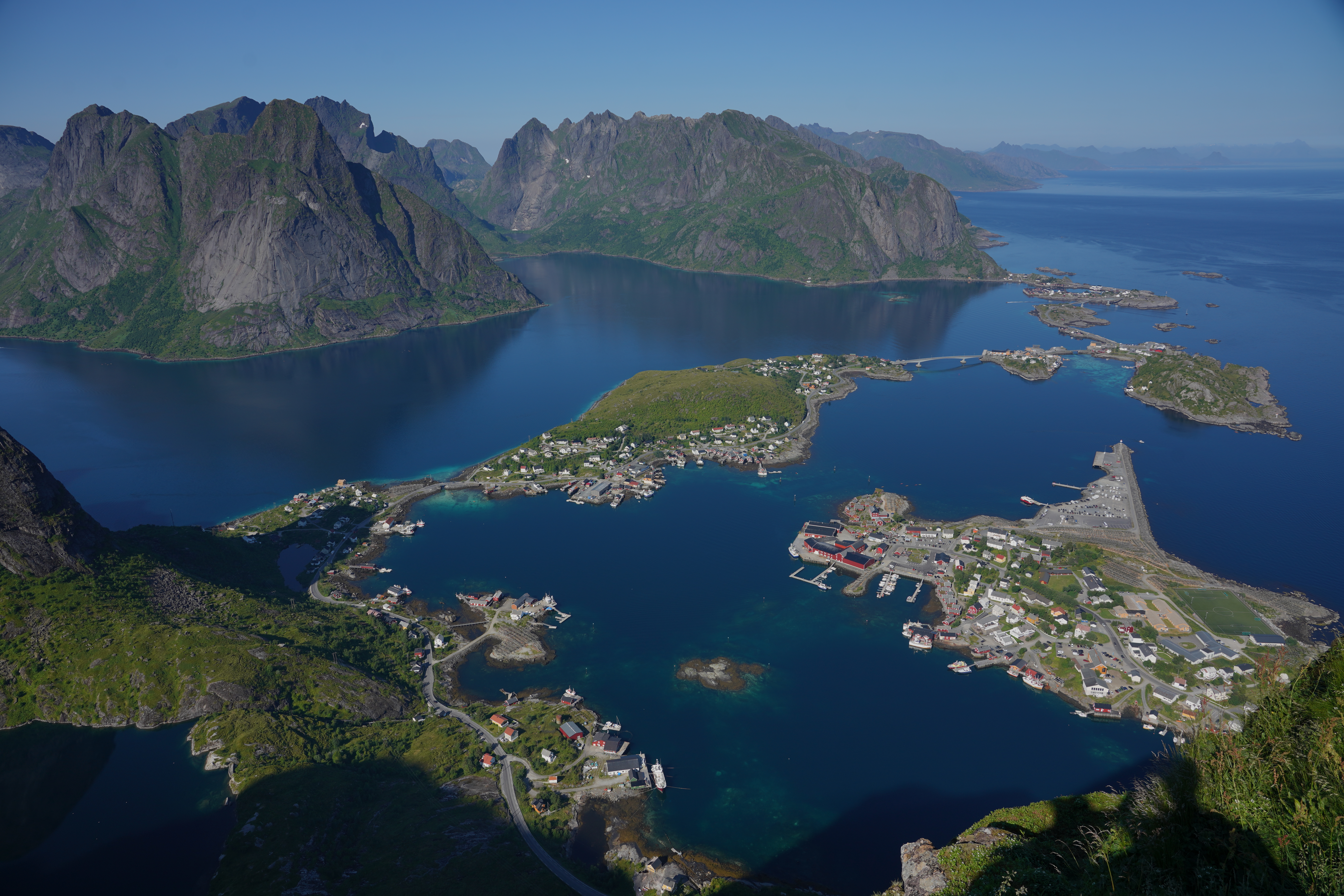
- Reine, Lofoten, seen from the top of Reinebringen
- Interactive map of Lofoten

Geography
- Coordinates: 68°20′N 14°40′E
- Archipelago: Lofoten archipelago
- Major islands: Austvågøya, Vestvågøya, Flakstadøya, Moskenesøya, Værøya, Røstlandet
- Area: 1,227 km^{2} (474 sq mi)

Administration
- Norway

Demographics
- Population: 24,500

Additional information
- Official website: lofoten.info/en

Lofoten (English: /ˈloʊfoʊtən, loʊˈfoʊtən/ LOH-foh-tən, loh-FOH-tən, Norwegian: [ˈlùːfuːtn̩]; Lule Sami: Lufoahtta; Northern Sami: Lufuohttá) is an archipelago and a traditional district in the county of Nordland, Norway. Lofoten has distinctive scenery with dramatic mountains and peaks, open sea and sheltered bays, beaches, and untouched lands. There are two towns, Svolvær and Leknes — the latter approximately 169 km (105 mi) north of the Arctic Circle and 2,420 km (1,500 mi) from the North Pole. Winter temperatures in the archipelago are extremely mild considering its northerly location – possibly the largest positive temperature anomaly in the world relative to latitude. As of 2017, the islands attract one million tourists each year. Winter tourism has grown significantly, with visitors coming to experience the northern lights and unique Arctic scenery during the polar night season.

== Etymology ==
In Norway, the archipelago and the area are called Lofoten. There have been many attempts to research the origins and meanings of both the names Lofoten and Ofoten, which have led to numerous theories but no definitive information. Critical examination has not reached any generally accepted and justified interpretation of the name.

According to one explanation Lofoten (Old Norse: Lófótr) was the original name of the island Vestvågøya. The first element is ló (i.e., "lynx") and the last element is derived from Norse fótr (i.e., "foot"), as the shape of the island must have been compared with that of a lynx's foot. (The old name of the neighbouring island Flakstadøya was Vargfót, "wolf's foot", from vargr "wolf".) The explanation has at least been seen in an article about Lofoten published in The New York Times newspaper, for which the reporter had claimed to have heard the explanation from the locals. However, this interpretation of the name has also received criticism. It is considered doubtful that the name Lófót itself meant the island of Vestvågøya from the beginning. Unlike, for example, the local names Værøya and Gimsøya, where the names clearly contain the endings meaning the island, the "i Lofot" appearing in the texts rather refers to the district, which nevertheless also included Vestvågøya.

Alternatively, the name could derive from the word for light in reference to the presence of aurora borealis as the word for light itself is the root of the Old Norse word for lynx lóa. However, the earliest evidence suggests that Lófótr was first the name of the island of Vestvågøy and later came to refer to the chain of islands. Most parsimonious is the analogy with Aurora Borealis, as the word fótr is typically not used to describe the feet of beasts of prey, instead using the word hrammr (paw) or löpp (also paw) for animals such as cats or dogs. Fótr can be used to describe legs, and as such, 'light leg' represents the most plausible etymology, taking into account the geography of the archipelago, eventually morphing to describe only the island of Vestvågøy before once again describing the island chain from its main island.

Another name one might come across is "Lofotveggen" or the Lofoten wall. The archipelago looks like a closed wall when seen from elevated points around Bodø Municipality or from the sea, some 100 kilometres (62 miles) long and 800–1,000 metres (2,600–3,300 feet) high.

== History ==
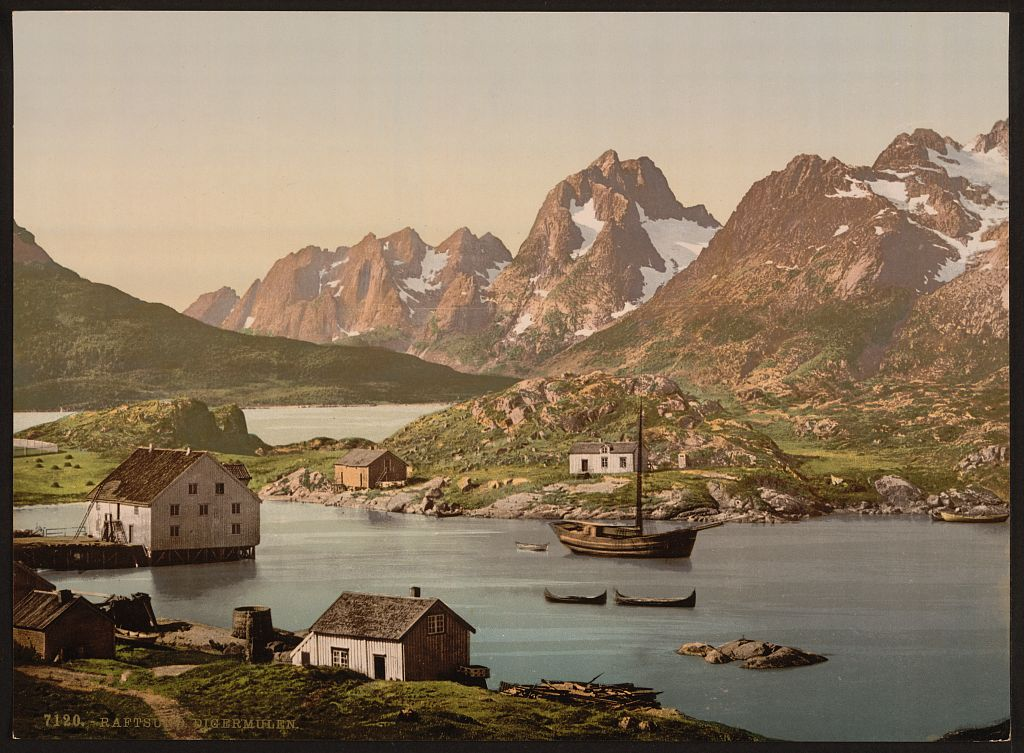
"Raftsund, Lofoten, Digermulen, Norway", c. 1890–1900.

According to Robert M. D'Anjou and others: "There is evidence of human settlement extending back at least 11,000 years in Lofoten, and the earliest archaeological sites ... are only about 5,500 years old, at the transition from the early to late Stone Age". Iron Age agriculture, livestock, and significant human habitation can be traced back to c. 250 BC.

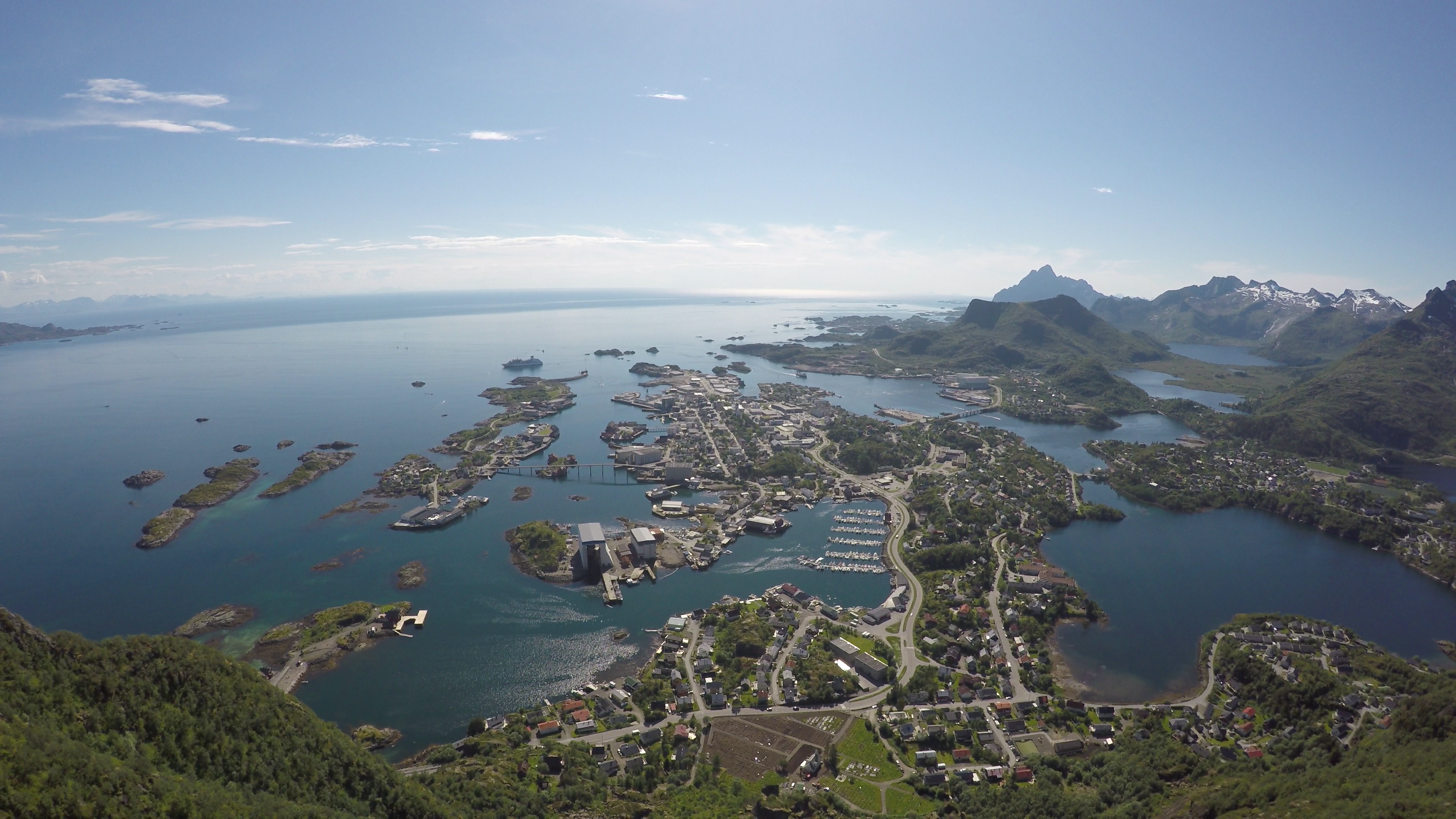
Svolvær in Lofoten, Norway. View from Svolværgeita

The town of Vågan (Old Norse: Vágar) is the first known town formation in northern Norway. It existed in the early Viking Age, maybe earlier, and was located on the southern coast of eastern Lofoten, near today's village Kabelvåg in Vågan Municipality. The Lofotr Viking Museum with the reconstructed 83-metre-long (272 ft) longhouse (the largest known) is located near Borg on Vestvågøya, which has many archeological finds from the Iron Age and Viking Age.

The islands have for more than 1,000 years been the centre of great cod fisheries, especially in winter, when the cod migrate south from the Barents Sea and gather in Lofoten to spawn. Bergen in southwestern Norway was for a long time the hub for the export of cod southward to different parts of Europe, particularly when trade was controlled by the Hanseatic League. In the lowland areas, particularly Vestvågøy, agriculture plays a significant role, as it has done since the Bronze Age.

In March 1941, the islands were raided by British Commandos during Operation Claymore, and in a subsequent diversionary attack to support the Vaagso raid in December.

== Geography ==
Lofoten and Vesterålen

Lofoten is located at the 68th and 69th parallels north of the Arctic Circle in North Norway. Lofoten encompasses the municipalities of Vågan, Vestvågøy, Flakstad, Moskenes, Værøy, and Røst. The principal islands, running from north to south, are:

- Southern tip of Hinnøya.
- Southern 60% (approx.) of Austvågøya (526.7 square kilometres (203.4 square miles) in total 68°20′N 14°40′E)
- Gimsøya (46.4 square kilometres (17.9 square miles) 68°18′N 14°11′E)
- Vestvågøya (411.1 square kilometres (158.7 square miles) 68°10′N 13°45′E)
- Flakstadøya (109.8 square kilometres (42.4 square miles) 68°5′N 13°20′E)
- Moskenesøya (185.9 square kilometres (71.8 square miles) 67°55′N 13°0′E)

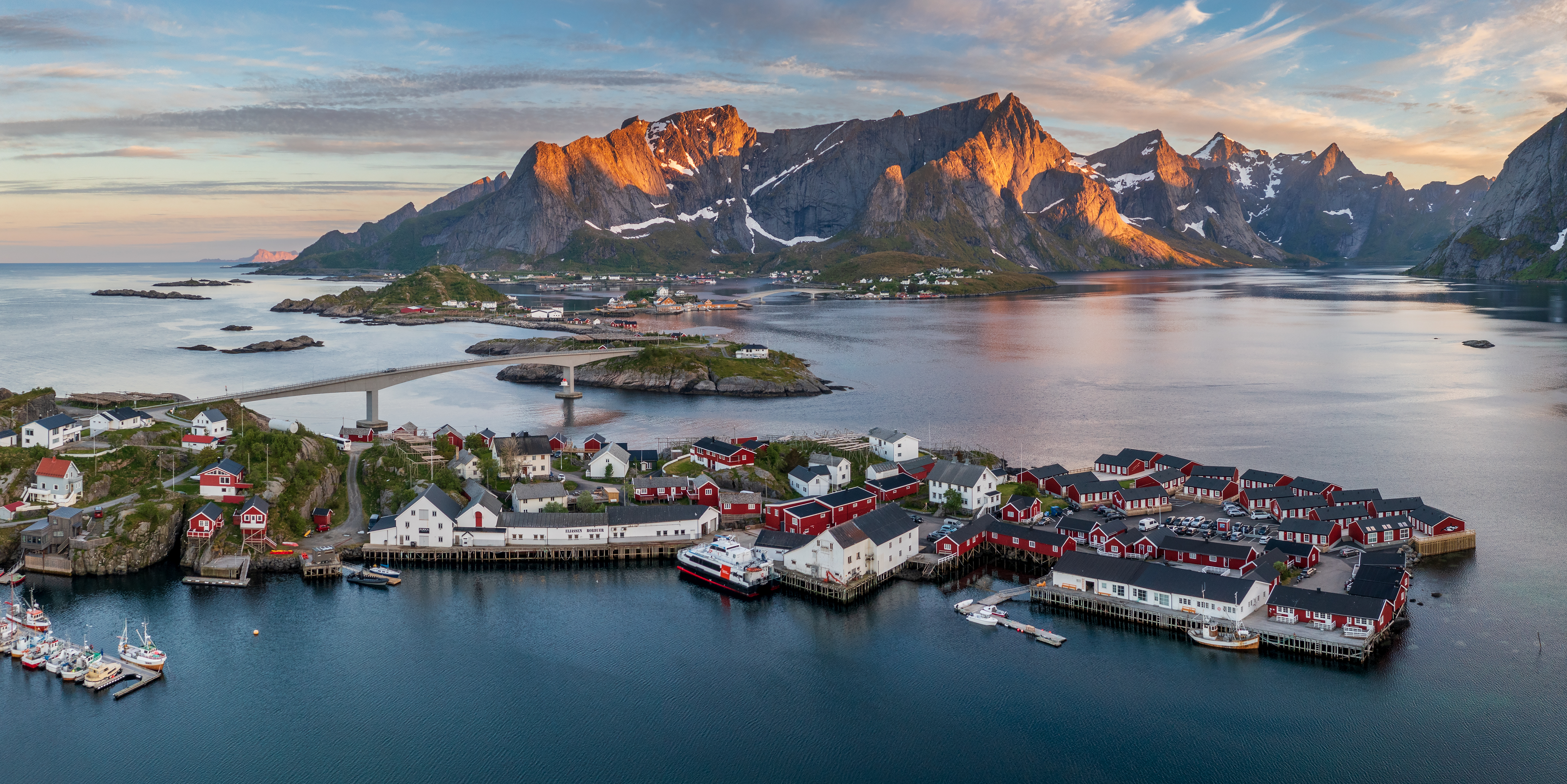
Hamnøya, Toppøya, Olenilsøya and other small islands of Reinefjorden in Moskenes, Nordland, Norway in 2022 June

Further to the south are the small and isolated islands of Værøy Municipality (67°40′N 12°40′E) and Røst Municipality (67°37′N 12°7′E). The total land area amounts to 1,227 square kilometres (474 square miles), and the population totals 24,500. Many will argue that Hinnøya, the northern part of Austvågøya and several hundred smaller islands, skerries, and rocks to the east of Austvågøya are also part of the Lofoten district. Historically, the territorial definition of Lofoten has changed significantly. Between the mainland and the Lofoten archipelago lies the vast, open Vestfjorden, and to the north is the Vesterålen district. The principal towns in Lofoten are Leknes in Vestvågøy Municipality and Svolvær in Vågan Municipality. The main islands are joined to each other and the mainland by road bridges.

The Lofoten Islands are characterised by their mountains and peaks, sheltered inlets, stretches of seashore and large virgin areas. The highest mountain in Lofoten is Higravstinden (1,161 metres (3,809 feet)) in Austvågøy; the Møysalen National Park just northeast of Lofoten has mountains reaching 1,262 metres (4,140 feet). The famous Moskstraumen (Malstrøm) system of tidal eddies is located in western Lofoten, and is indeed the root of the term maelstrom.

=== Geology ===
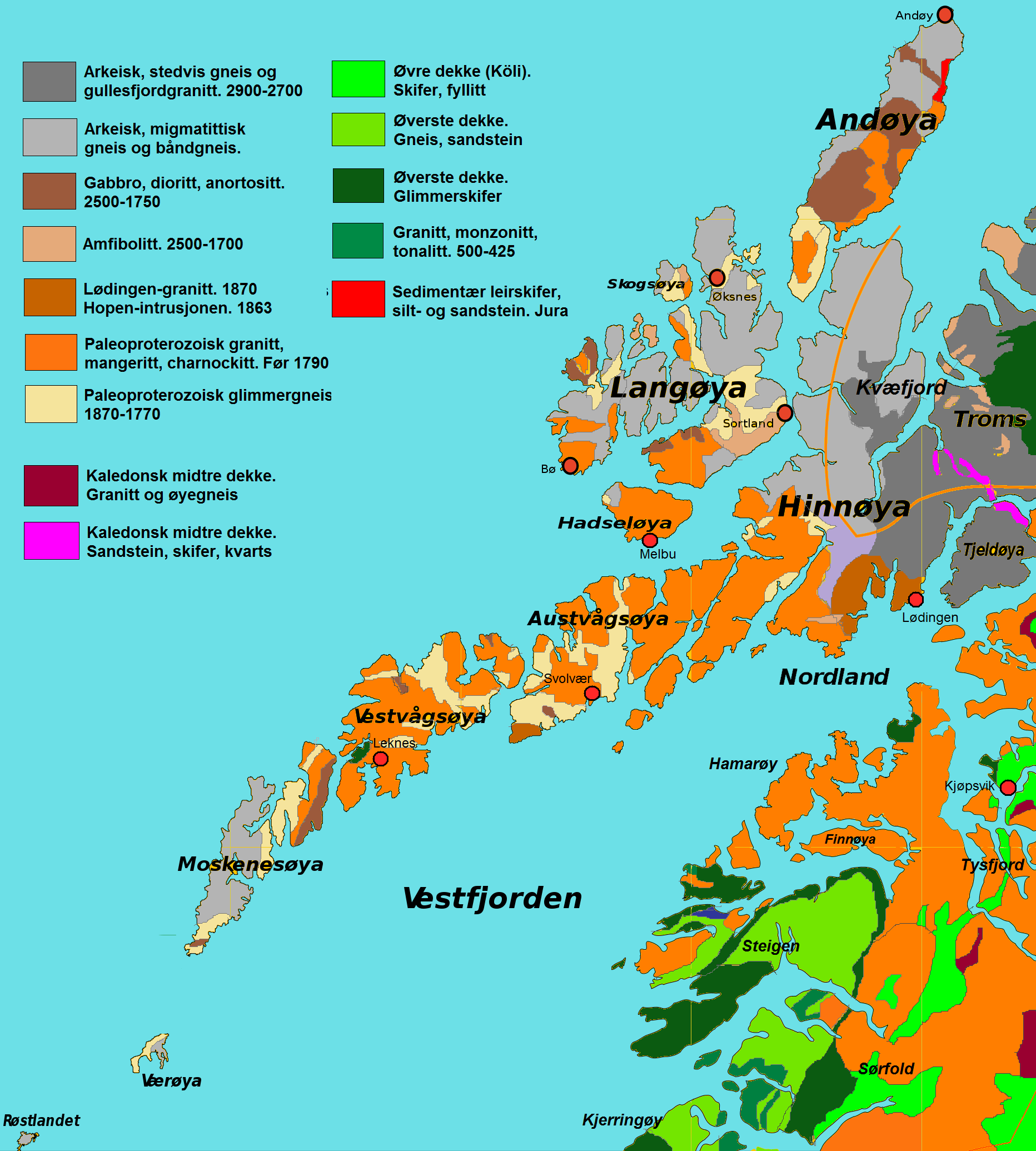
Geological map of Lofoten and Vesterålen

Lofoten is a horst ridge of bedrock. The rocks of Lofoten belong to the wider Western Gneiss Region of Norway. Some of the high relief and irregular surfaces of Lofoten has been attributed to etching that took place during the Mesozoic Era. Evidence of this would be the kaolinite found at some locations. To the northwest the Lofoten archipelago is bounded by the NE–SW-trending West Lofoten Border Fault. This is a normal fault whose fault scarp has been eroded, forming a strandflat.

In Vestvågøya, mountains have steep slopes towards the open sea in the northwest and southeast, while slopes pointing towards the interior of the island are more gradual. This is the result of erosion acting on a landscape that has been uplifted along NE–SW-trending faults in the margins of Lofoten while the interior axis has remained more stable. In tectonic terms mountains are half-grabens and faults are of the dip-slip type.

The sea around Lofoten is known to host significant oil reserves: 1.3 bn barrels. Oil extraction in the Lofoten area is prohibited.

=== Oceanography ===
The Lofoten archipelago lies along the eastern margin of the Lofoten Basin Vortex (also referred to as the Lofoten Basin Eddy), a deep depression in the Norwegian Sea that reaches the depths of over 3,000 M, which acts as a major heat reservoir in the Nordic Seas. Most of this is due to the inflow of the warm, saline Atlantic Water, which plays an important role in regional water mass transformation.

This regional circulation is dominated by two branches of the Norwegian Atlantic Current (NwAC)

- The Norwegian Atlantic Slope Current, which flows northwards along the continental shelf break and the steep Lofoten Escarpment.
- The Norwegian Atlantic Front Current, which follows a more offshore path along the Mohn, Knipovich Ridge. This forms a sharp hydrographic front between the warmer Atlantic waters in the east and the colder, fresher waters of Arctic origin in the west.

The interactions between the Norwegian Atlantic Current and the fresher Norwegian Coastal Current are particularly active in the Lofoten Basin, where the high eddy activity enhances the mixing and tracer exchanges between the two currents. Now the Lofoten Vortex itself is a semi-permanent feature that is distinguishable by its unusual location, longevity, and deep vertical structure, especially with the Atlantic Water penetrating down to approximately 1,000 m in depth within the eddy core. Observations seen from Seagliders over three years (2012-2015) have revealed a detailed evolution, showing that the vortex maintains a weakly stratified core and plays a significant role in the dissipation of kinetic energy in the basin.

=== Wildlife ===
The sea is rich with life, and the world's largest deep water coral reef, called the Røst Reef, is located west of Røst. Approximately 70% of all fish caught in the Norwegian and Barents seas use its islands' waters as a breeding ground. Otters are common, and there are elk on the largest islands. There are some woodlands with downy birch and rowan. There are no native conifer forests in Lofoten, but some small areas with private spruce plantations. Hedlundia hybrida and Malus sylvestris occurs in Lofoten, but not further north.

==== Birds ====
Some 27,000 hectares (100 mi^{2}) of marine waters along the north-western coasts and fjords of the Lofoten Islands have been designated an Important Bird Area (IBA) by BirdLife International (BLI) because it supports overwintering populations of common eiders and yellow-billed loons. The IBA contains or overlaps with the Seløya, Morfjorden, Laukvikøyene, Eggum and Borgværet nature reserves, as well as the Laukvikøyene Ramsar site. Lofoten has a high density of sea eagles and cormorants, and millions of other sea birds, among them the colourful puffin. It has the largest seabird colony in mainland Europe. The birds once mistaken for the extinct great auk turned out to be some of the nine king penguins released around Norway's Lofoten Islands in August 1936, there until at least 1944.

=== Climate ===
Lofoten features a mostly subpolar oceanic climate (Cfc) under the Köppen climate classification, although some areas, such as Skrova, feature a temperate oceanic climate (Cfb). Winter temperatures in Lofoten are extremely mild considering its location north of the Arctic Circle – possibly the largest positive temperature anomaly in the world relative to latitude. The mild winters are a result of the temperate waters of the Norwegian Sea, which is warmed by the North Atlantic Current and the Norwegian Current. The mild air (Lows) from the Atlantic, having a free path northwards even in winter, is also very significant.

Strong winds can occur in late autumn and winter. Snow and sleet are not uncommon in winter. The mountains can have substantial snowfall, and avalanches may occur on steep slopes.

In Svolvær, the sun is above the horizon continuously ("midnight sun") from 25 May to 17 July, and in winter the sun does not rise from 4 December to 7 January. In Leknes, the sun is above the horizon from 26 May to 17 July, and in winter, the sun does not rise from 9 December to 4 January.

Sea temperatures have been recorded since 1935. At 1 metre (3 feet 3 inches) depth in the sea near Skrova, water temperatures vary from a low of 3 °C (37 °F) in March to 14 °C (57 °F) in August, some years peaking above 17 °C (63 °F). November is around 7–8 °C (45–46 °F). At a depth of 200 metres (660 feet), the temperature is near 8 °C (46 °F) all year. Skrova lighthouse on an island near Svolvær has the longest recording of air temperature in Lofoten. The highest temperature recorded is 30.4 °C (86.7 °F) in June 1972. The lowest temperature recorded is −15.1 °C (4.8 °F) in February 1966. The last overnight freeze in June occurred in 1962, and the last in September occurred in 1986. Skrova and nearby Svolvær are among the places in North Norway that can record what Norwegians call "tropical nights," when the overnight low does not drop below 20 °C (68 °F). The warmest night recorded in Lofoten was July 1, 1972 at Skrova with low 23.8 °C (74.8 °F), and the earliest in summer was June 10, 2011 with low 21.5 °C (70.7 °F). The wettest month recorded is December 1936 with 227 mm, and the driest is January 2014 with 0.9 mm.

Climate data for Skrova 1991-2020 (14 m, precipitation days 1961-90, extremes 1934-2025)
Month	Jan	Feb	Mar	Apr	May	Jun	Jul	Aug	Sep	Oct	Nov	Dec	Year
Record high °C (°F)	10.6 (51.1)	9.8 (49.6)	10 (50)	17.4 (63.3)	24.3 (75.7)	30.4 (86.7)	29.8 (85.6)	27.7 (81.9)	22.1 (71.8)	17.1 (62.8)	13 (55)	11.2 (52.2)	30.4 (86.7)
Mean daily maximum °C (°F)	2.4 (36.3)	1.6 (34.9)	2.2 (36.0)	4.8 (40.6)	9 (48)	13 (55)	16.1 (61.0)	15.4 (59.7)	12 (54)	7.8 (46.0)	5.4 (41.7)	3.6 (38.5)	7.8 (46.0)
Daily mean °C (°F)	0.9 (33.6)	0.2 (32.4)	0.7 (33.3)	3.1 (37.6)	6.8 (44.2)	10.6 (51.1)	13.6 (56.5)	13.3 (55.9)	10.4 (50.7)	6.5 (43.7)	4 (39)	2.2 (36.0)	6.0 (42.8)
Mean daily minimum °C (°F)	−1 (30)	−1.6 (29.1)	−0.9 (30.4)	1.4 (34.5)	4.9 (40.8)	8.6 (47.5)	11.5 (52.7)	11.5 (52.7)	8.8 (47.8)	4.9 (40.8)	2.2 (36.0)	0.3 (32.5)	4.2 (39.6)
Record low °C (°F)	−12.7 (9.1)	−15.1 (4.8)	−12.3 (9.9)	−8.5 (16.7)	−3.4 (25.9)	−1.2 (29.8)	3.7 (38.7)	3.9 (39.0)	−1.4 (29.5)	−4.5 (23.9)	−10.7 (12.7)	−11.9 (10.6)	−15.1 (4.8)
Average precipitation mm (inches)	89 (3.5)	81 (3.2)	65 (2.6)	49 (1.9)	46 (1.8)	37 (1.5)	50 (2.0)	48 (1.9)	79 (3.1)	88 (3.5)	97 (3.8)	90 (3.5)	819 (32.3)
Average precipitation days (≥ 1.0 mm)	14	11	11	10	9	9	11	10	15	17	15	15	147
Source 1: Norwegian Meteorological Institute
Source 2: Noaa WMO averages 91-2020 Norway

Even if the islands are not that large, there are climatic differences. Værøy and Røst, which are furthest west, have the warmest winters, but summer highs are cooler. Vestvågøy, with the town of Leknes, has lowland in the island's interior, with mountains nearby; winters here are slightly colder and much wetter than at Skrova, while summers are drier and comparable.

Climate data for Leknes Airport 1991–2020
Month	Jan	Feb	Mar	Apr	May	Jun	Jul	Aug	Sep	Oct	Nov	Dec	Year
Mean daily maximum °C (°F)	1 (34)	1 (34)	2 (36)	6 (43)	10 (50)	12 (54)	16 (61)	15 (59)	12 (54)	8 (46)	4 (39)	3 (37)	8 (46)
Daily mean °C (°F)	0 (32)	−0.6 (30.9)	0 (32)	2.8 (37.0)	6.5 (43.7)	9.9 (49.8)	12.8 (55.0)	12.2 (54.0)	9.4 (48.9)	5.2 (41.4)	2.6 (36.7)	1 (34)	5.2 (41.3)
Mean daily minimum °C (°F)	−2 (28)	−2 (28)	−2 (28)	1 (34)	4 (39)	8 (46)	11 (52)	10 (50)	7 (45)	4 (39)	2 (36)	0 (32)	3 (38)
Average precipitation mm (inches)	203 (8.0)	174 (6.9)	161 (6.3)	93 (3.7)	74 (2.9)	45 (1.8)	38 (1.5)	78 (3.1)	123 (4.8)	161 (6.3)	173 (6.8)	223 (8.8)	1,546 (60.9)
Source 1: Norwegian Meteorological Institute
Source 2: Weatheronline climate robot (avg highs/lows)

== Sport ==
=== Mountaineering and rock climbing ===
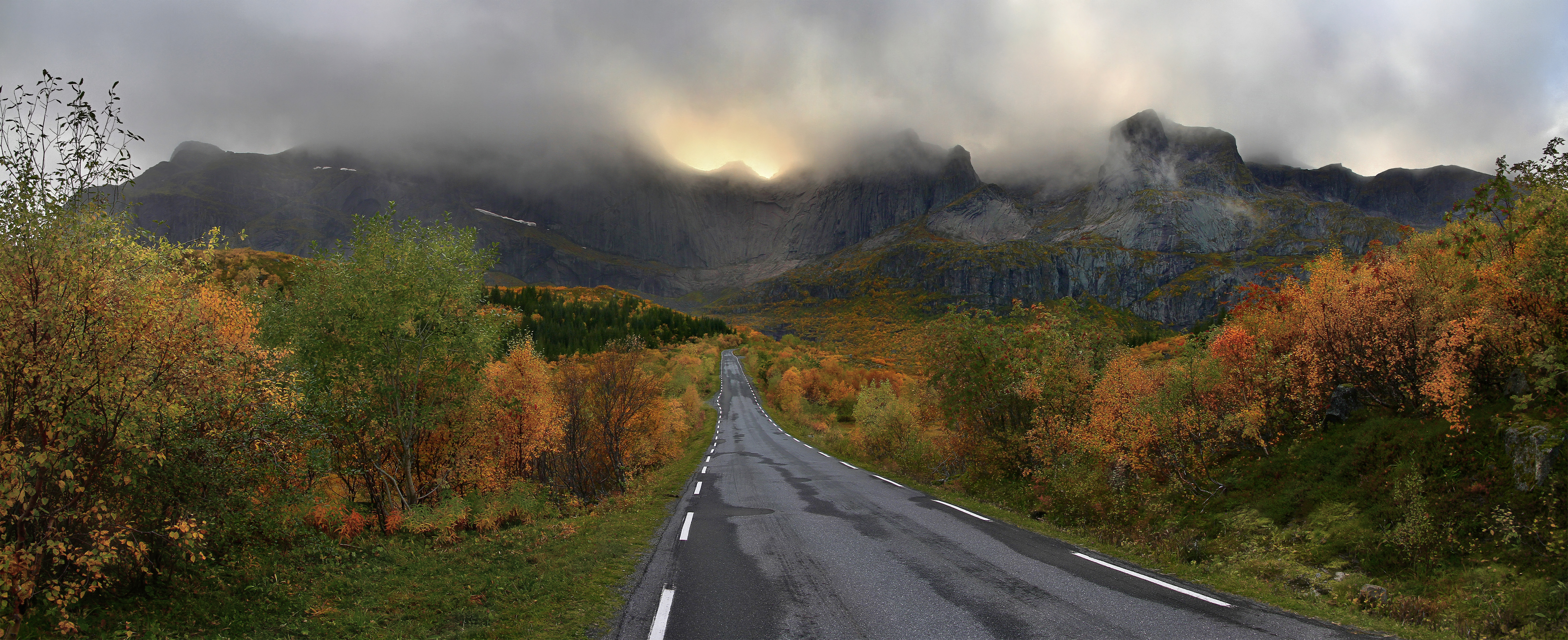
A mountain massif of Flakstadøya island backgrounding the road to Nusfjord village

Lofoten offers many opportunities for rock climbing and mountaineering. It has 24 hours of daylight in the summer and has Alpine-style ridges, summits, and glaciers, but at a height of less than 1,200 metres (3,900 feet). The main centre for rock climbing is Henningsvær on Austvågøya.

The main areas for mountaineering and climbing are on Austvågøya and Moskenesøya. Moskenesøya offers serious, remote mountaineering, whereas Austvågøya is a very popular area for rock climbing.

=== Football ===
Located in the village of Henningsvaer, the football pitch at Henningsvaer Stadium rests on a rocky islet and has no actual seats.

=== Surfing ===
Unstad is one of its better-known surf spots. Every September, surfers from around the world visit to compete in the Lofoten Masters.

=== Cycling ===
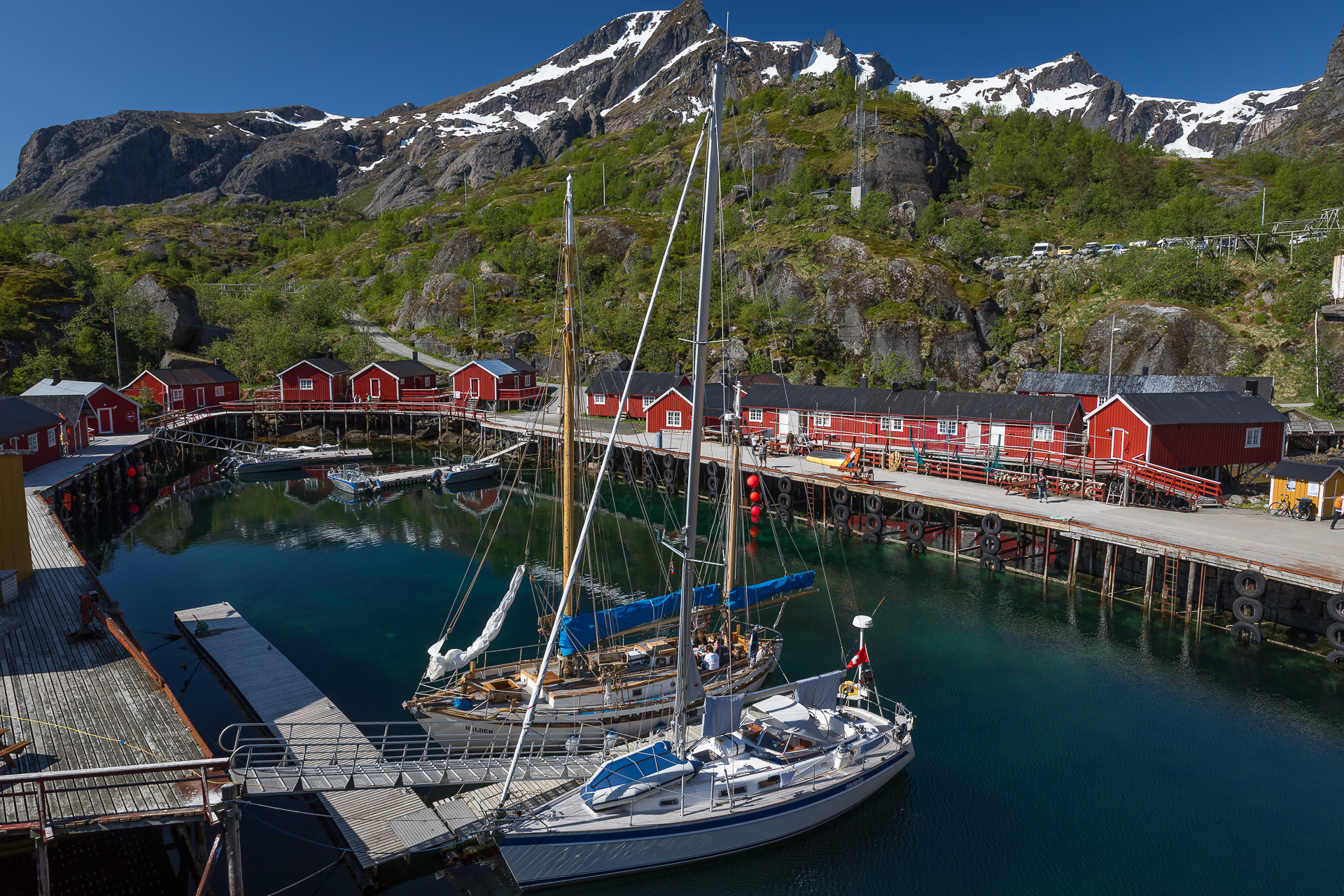
Nusfjord in Lofoten, Norway

There is a well-marked cycling route that goes from Å in the south and continues past Fiskebøl in the north. The route is part public road, part cycle path, with the option to bypass all tunnels by either the cycle path (tunnels through mountains) or by boat. Traffic is generally light, though in July there may be many campervans. Some of the more remote sections are on gravel roads. There is a dedicated cycling ferry that sails between Ballstad and Nusfjord, allowing cyclists to avoid the long, steep Nappstraum tunnel. The route hugs the coastline for most of its length, where it is generally flat. As it turns inland through the mountain passes, there are a couple of 300–400-metre (980–1,310-foot) climbs.

The Lofoten Insomnia Cycling Race takes place every year around midsummer, possibly in the midnight sun, but certainly in 24-hour daylight, along the whole Lofoten archipelago.

The Arctic Race of Norway, the world's northernmost professional road cycling stage race, which takes place every year in Northern Norway, crossed the Lofoten Islands during its first edition in August 2013. As of 2015, the race was planned to be back in 2019 from Thursday, 15 August to Sunday, 18 August. The first two stages will cross the Lofoten archipelago from west to east.

== Transportation ==
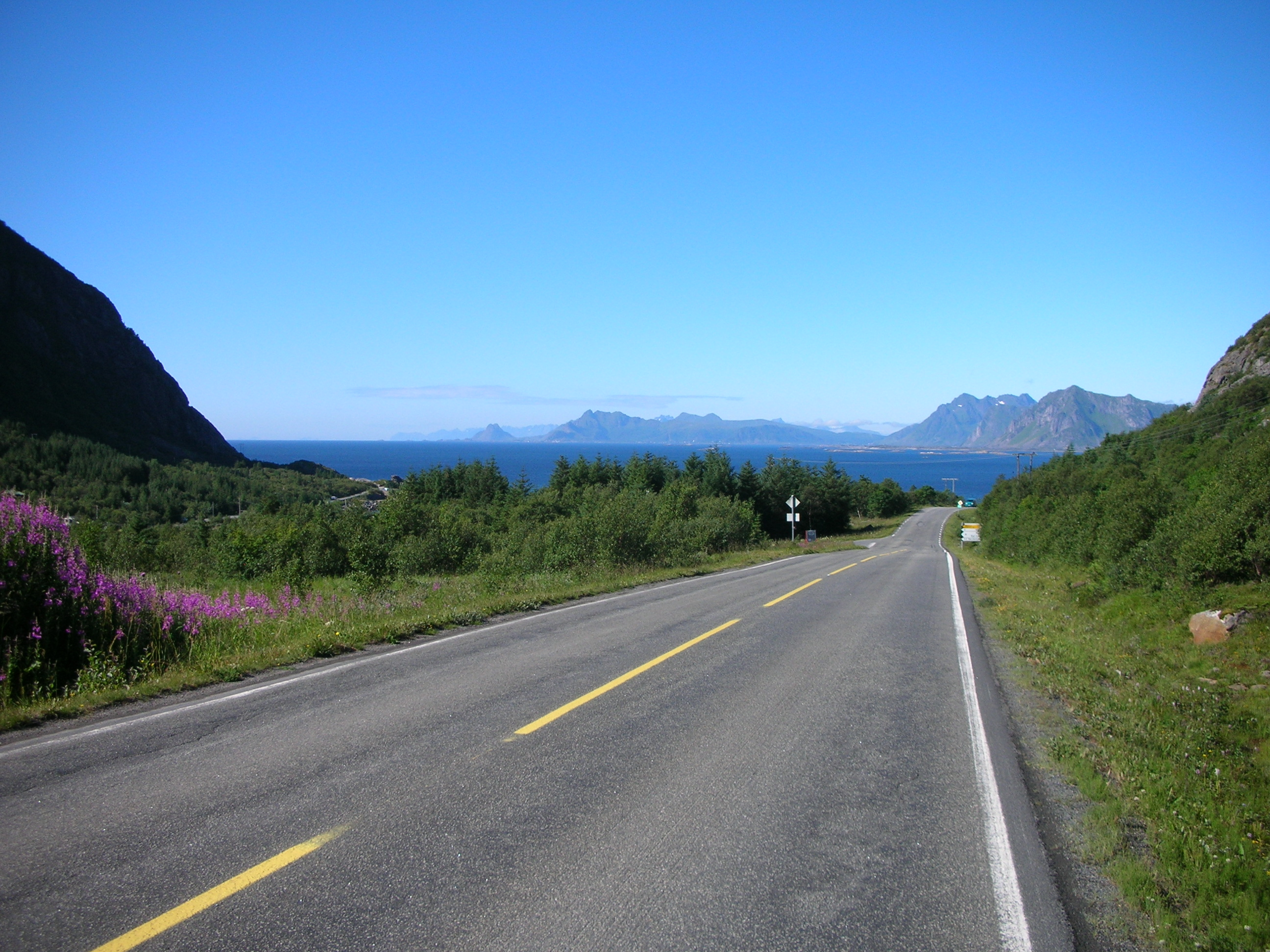
The E10 road. View from Rørvika in Vågan west towards Vestvågøya, 2007

The European road E10 connects the larger islands of Lofoten with bridges and undersea tunnels. The E10 road also connects Lofoten to the mainland of Norway via the Lofast road, which was officially opened on 1 December 2007. There are several daily bus services between the islands of Lofoten and between Lofoten and the mainland along E10. The Lofoten Islands are not serviced by any trains. However, the city of Narvik is connected to Stockholm and Oslo by train and connects directly to the Lofoten bus line.

Bodø is often used as a hub for travel to Lofoten. In addition to air travel, there is a ferry connecting Bodø to Moskenes, Værøy, and Røst, and a speedboat connection to Svolvær. Bodø is connected by train to Trondheim and Oslo. There is also a ferry connecting Svolvær to Skutvik in Hamarøy Municipality, with a road connection east to E6. Hurtigruten calls at Stamsund and Svolvær.

Several small airports also serve Lofoten:

- Leknes Airport (101,757 passengers in 2014)
- Svolvær Airport, Helle (74,496 passengers in 2014)
- Røst Airport (9,889 passengers in 2014), which mainly offers flights to Bodø.
- Værøy Heliport (9,420 passengers in 2014)
- Stokmarknes Airport, Skagen (93,782 passengers in 2016) is located in Vesterålen.
- Harstad/Narvik Airport, Evenes has direct flights to Oslo and Trondheim.

== Culture ==
Lofoten International Art Festival (Lofoten internasjonale kunstfestival, LIAF) is a contemporary art biennale with no set venue or location on the archipelago. Artists who have participated include Kjersti Andvig, Michel Auder, A K Dolven, Ida Ekblad, Elmgreen & Dragset, and Lawrence Weiner.

The North Norwegian Art Centre (Nordnorsk Kunstnersenter, NNKS) was established in Svolvær in 1979.

KaviarFactory is a privately owned contemporary art space in Henningsvær.

The Nordland School of Art and Film (Nordland kunst- og filmhøgskole, NKFS) was established in Kabelvåg in 1997.

Norwegian painter Gunnar Berg was known for his paintings of his native Lofoten. He principally painted scenes of everyday life among local fishermen. Other artists whose work has been associated with Lofoten include Adelsteen Normann, Otto Sinding, Christian Krohg, Theodor Kittelsen, Lev Lagorio, Ernst Wilhelm Nay and Ingo Kühl.

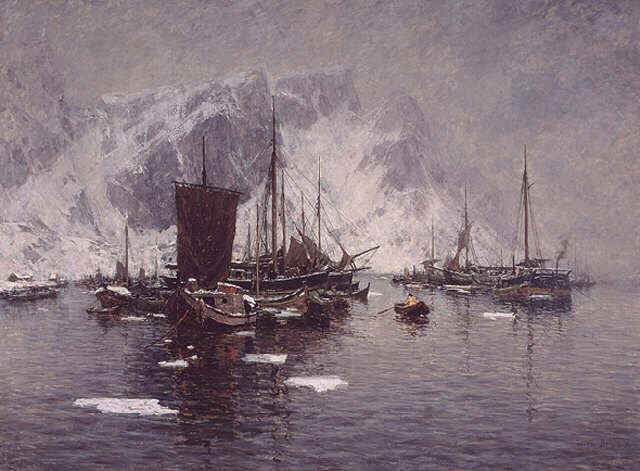
Fiskebåter ved Reine by Gunnar Berg (without year)

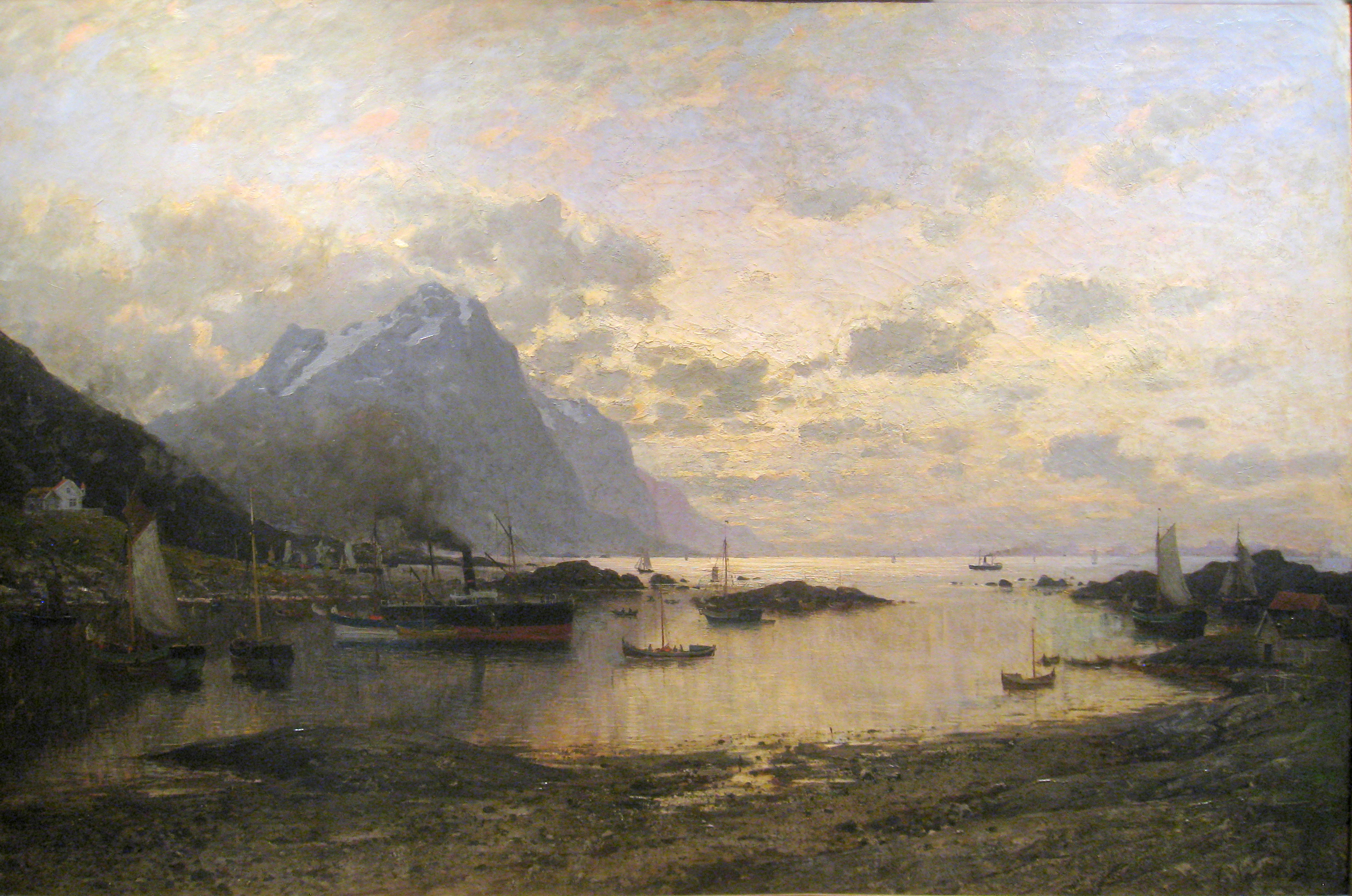
Dampskipsanløp i Lofoten by Adelsteen Normann (1885)

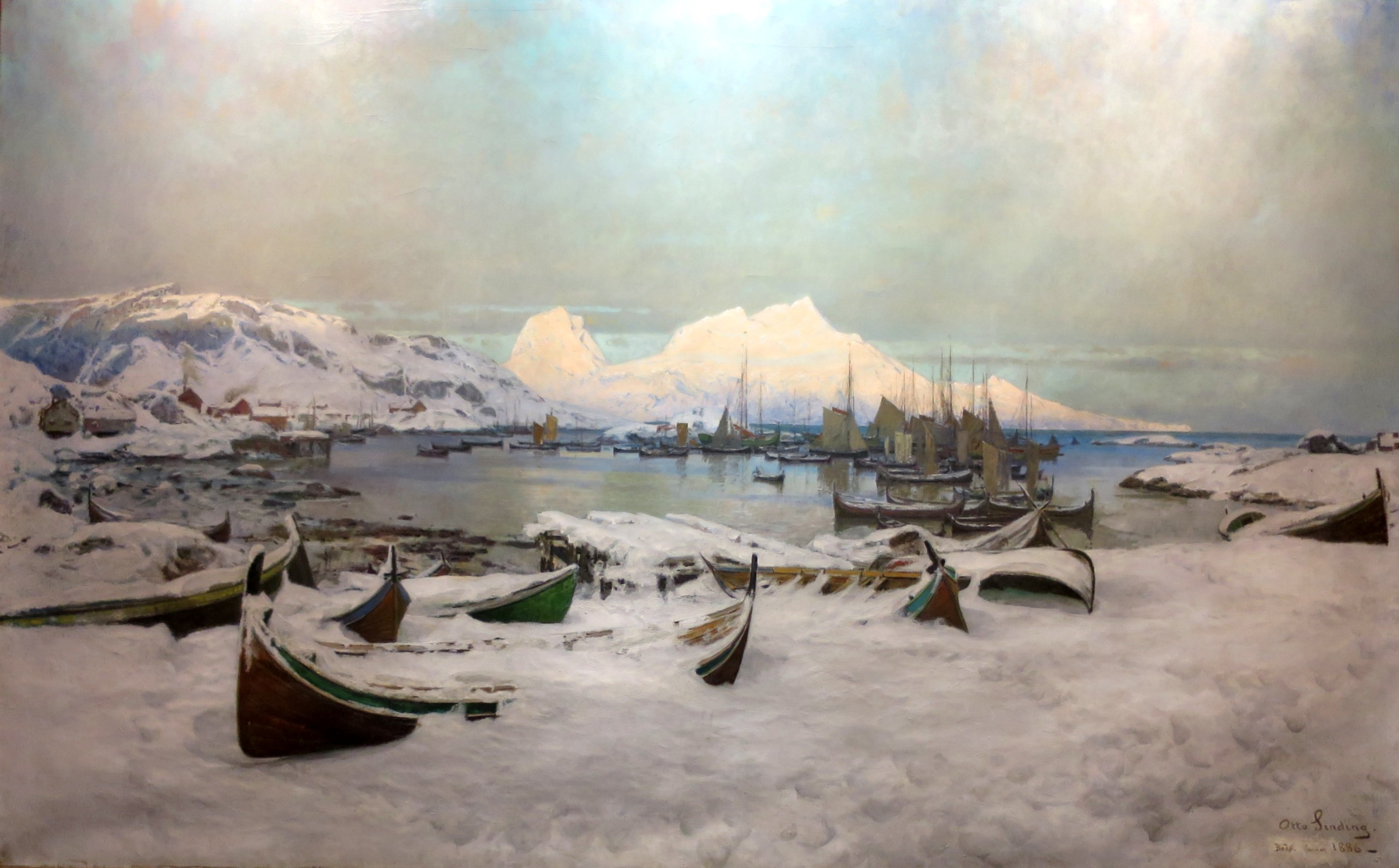
Winter in Lofoten by Otto Sinding (1886)

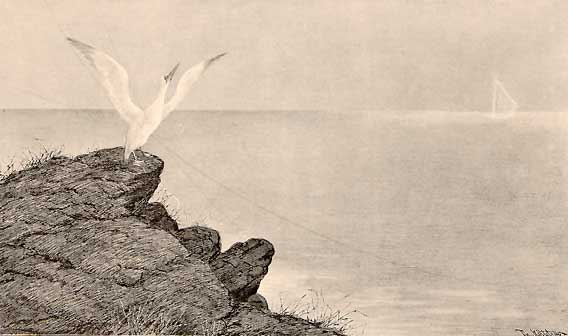
Fra Lofoten by Theodor Kittelsen (1890)

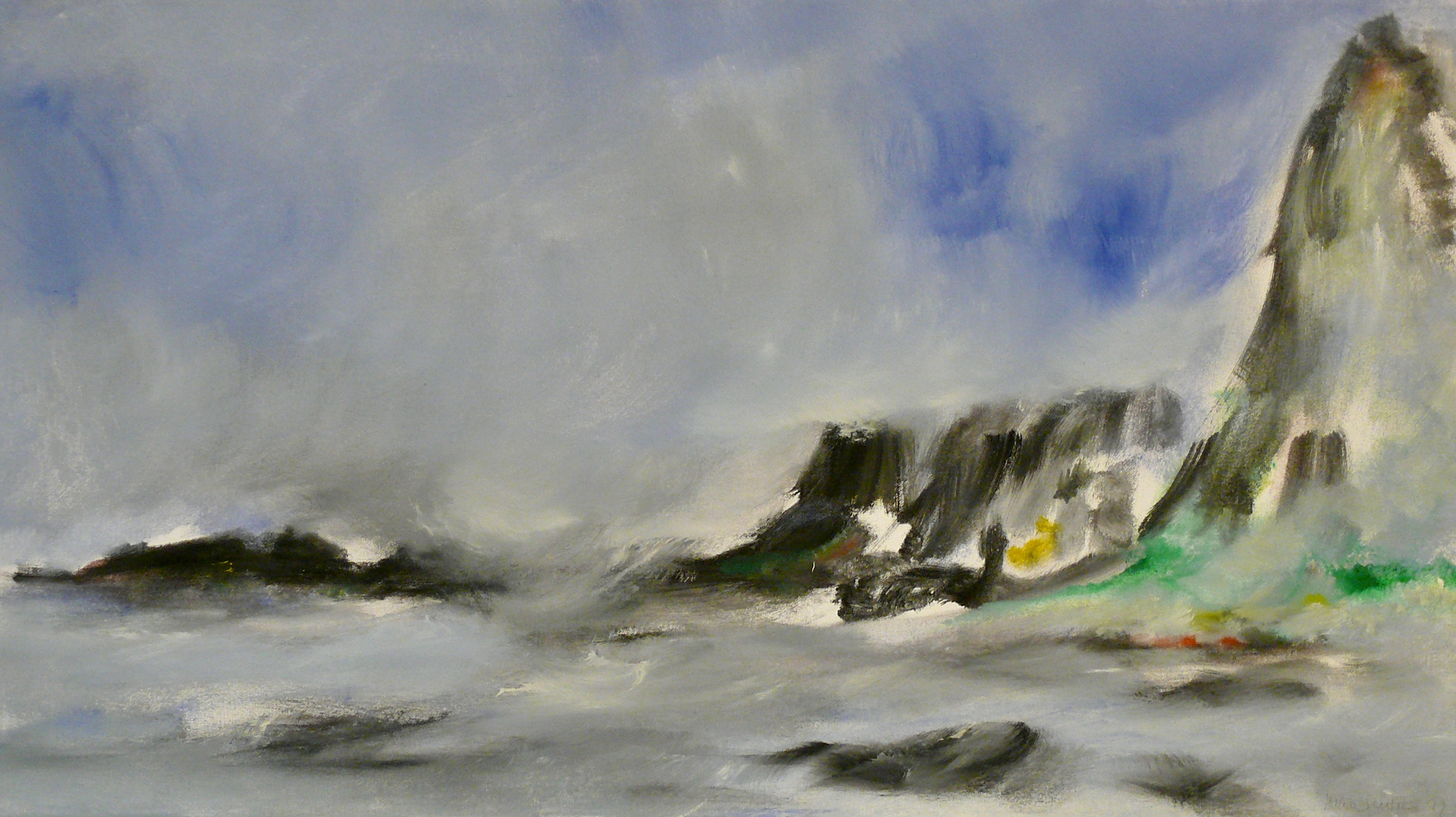
Moskstraumen I, Reine, Lofoten, by Ingo Kühl (1999)

== See also ==
- Atlantic cod
