= Leknes =

Town in Vestvågøy Municipality, Norway

- Town/City
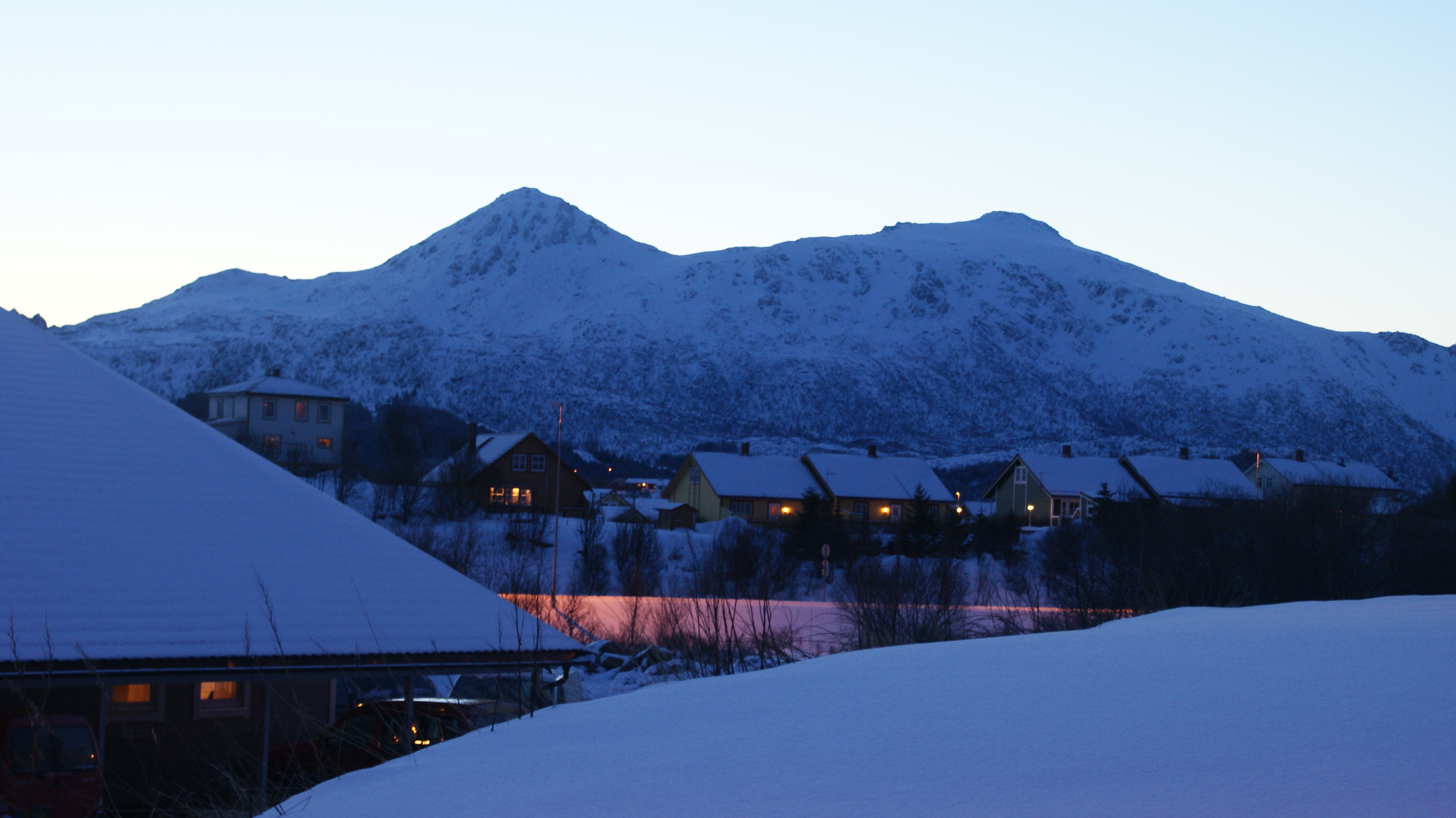
- View of Leknes in winter (Bulitinden and Guratinden mountains in background)
- Interactive map of Leknes
- Location within Nordland Location within Norway
- Coordinates: 68.1475°N 13.6115°E
- Country: Norway
- Region: Northern Norway
- County: Nordland
- District: Lofoten
- Municipality: Vestvågøy Municipality
- Established as
- Town (By): 2002

Area
  - Total: 2.7 km^{2} (1.0 sq mi)
- Elevation: 10 m (33 ft)

Population (2023)
  - Total: 3,763
  - Density: 1,394/km^{2} (3,610/sq mi)
- Time zone: UTC+01:00 (CET)
  - Summer (DST): UTC+02:00 (CEST)
- Post Code: 8370 Leknes

Leknes is a town in Vestvågøy Municipality in Nordland county, Norway. The town is also the administrative centre of Vestvågøy Municipality (with 11,619 inhabitants, it is the most populous municipality in Lofoten and Vesterålen). Leknes was designated a "town" (Norwegian: by) in 2002. The 2.7-square-kilometre (670-acre) town has a population (2023) of 3,763 and a population density of 1,394 inhabitants per square kilometre (3,610/sq mi).

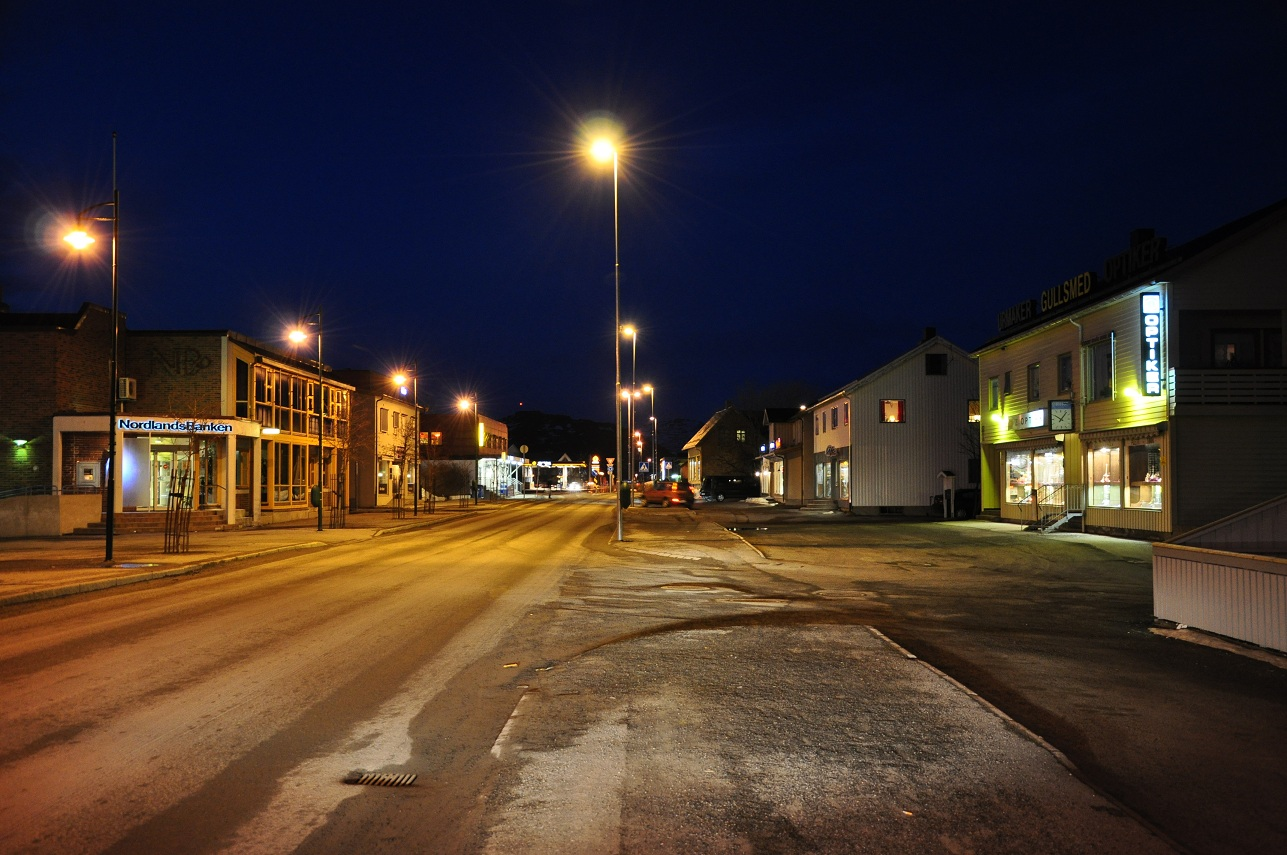
Main street of Leknes by night

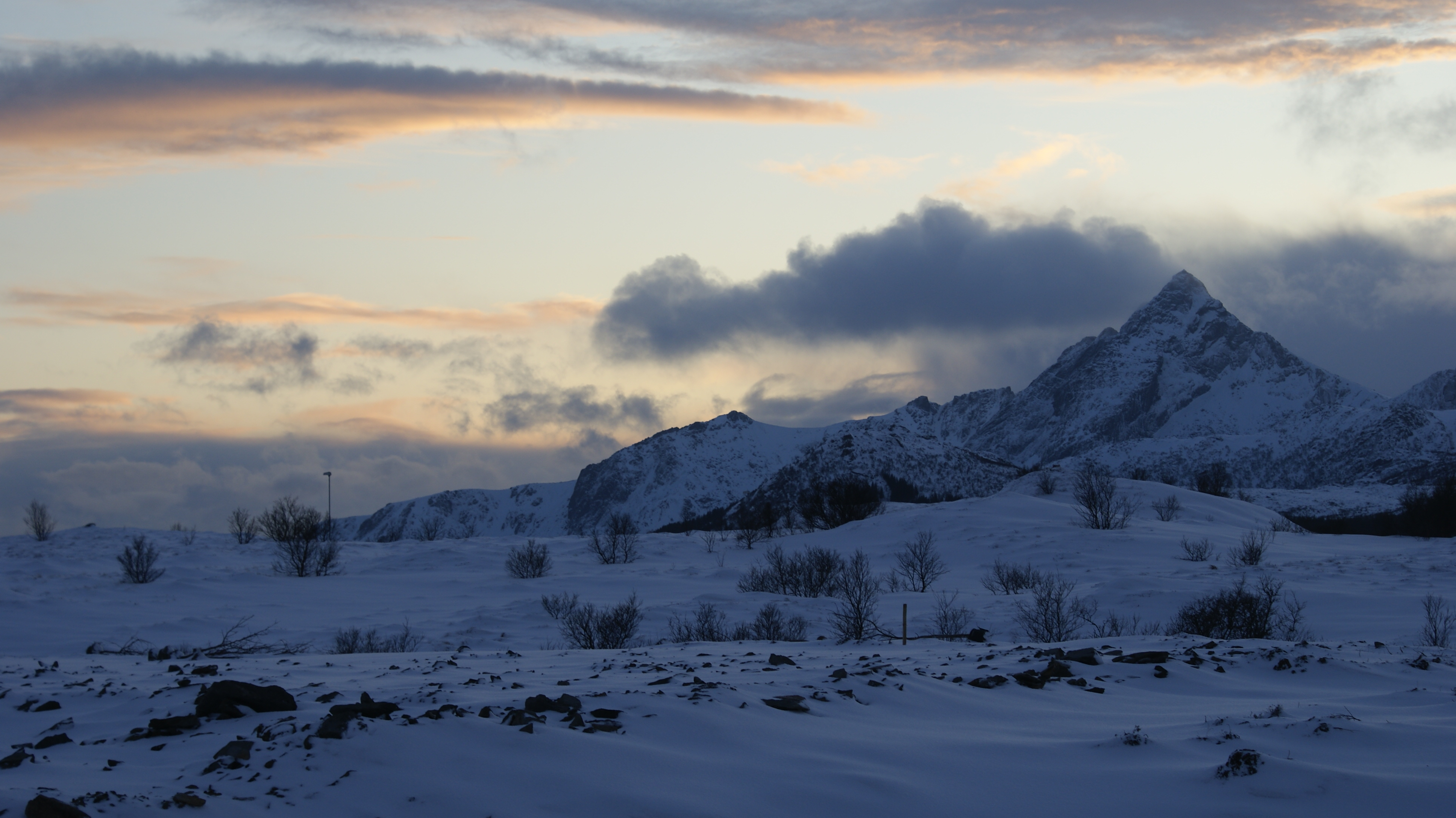
Leknes in winter: view towards Skottinden

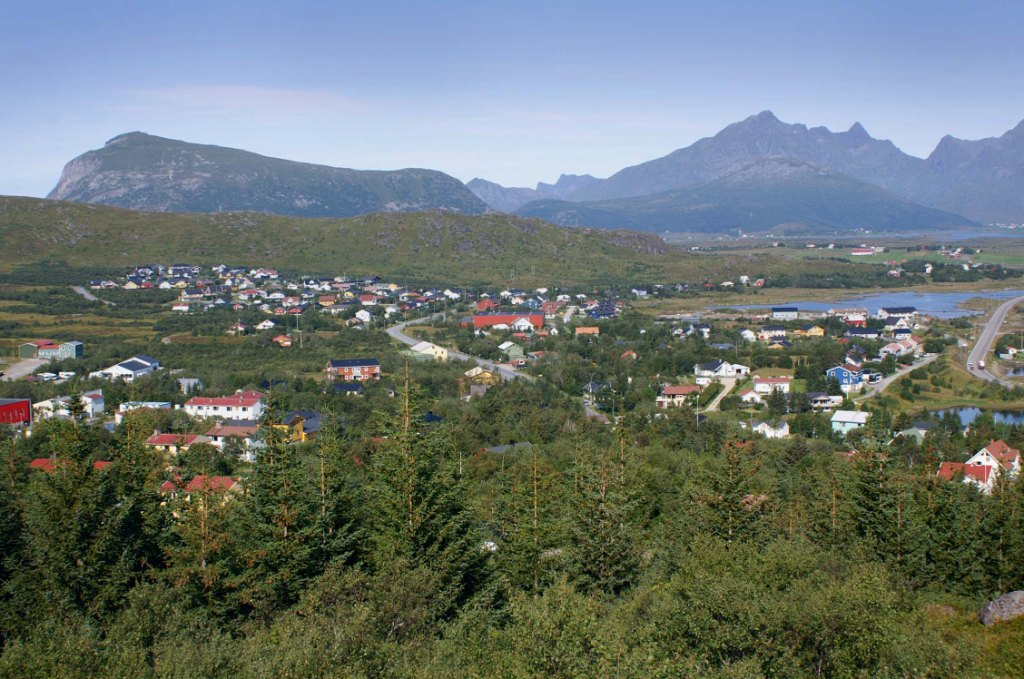
Gravdal, which together with Fygle have grown together with Leknes, creating an urban area with over 5,400 inhabitants.

The town is situated in the geographical middle of the Lofoten archipelago on the island of Vestvågøya. It is approximately 68 kilometres (42 mi) west of the town of Svolvær and 65 kilometres (40 mi) east of the village of Å in Moskenes Municipality. Leknes is one of the few towns in Lofoten that does not depend on fisheries and does not have its town centre by the sea. Because of this, and because of its rapid growth in recent years, it does not have the same traditional wooden architecture as most fishing villages in Lofoten. However, the natural surroundings are among the most stunning in Norway, with mountains, peaks, cliffs, and white sandy beaches.

The town's harbour Leknes Havn is one of Norway's most important and visited harbours for cruise ships. The old school in the Fygle neighborhood has been converted into a museum. Hol Church is located on the eastern edge of the town. Leknes and the neighboring villages of Fygle and Gravdal have grown together over the years through conurbation. One branch of the Nordland Hospital is located in Gravdal, which is located about 4 kilometres (2.5 mi) southwest of the centre of Leknes. In Leknes, the sun (midnight sun) is above the horizon from May 26 to July 17, and in the winter, the sun does not rise in Leknes from December 9 to January 4.

== Transportation ==
Leknes is the trading and shopping centre of Lofoten, only rivaled by Svolvær. The European route E10 highway runs through the town connecting all the main islands of Lofoten to the mainland. Leknes also has an airport, Leknes Airport, for regional aircraft, with 7 daily scheduled flights to Bodø and 1 daily flight to Tromsø with the airline Widerøe. The town has a small bus terminal that is a hub with bus links to the rest of Lofoten.

== Climate ==
The weather station is located at the small Leknes Airport. The all-time high is 29.9 °C (85.8 °F) recorded July 2018, and the all-time low is −15.8 °C (3.6 °F) from February 2019. Winters get abundant precipitation in Leknes. Summers are much drier with only 25 % of the winter precipitation. The weather station started up in 1972; records available since 2002.

Climate data for Leknes Airport 1991-2020
Month	Jan	Feb	Mar	Apr	May	Jun	Jul	Aug	Sep	Oct	Nov	Dec	Year
Daily mean °C (°F)	0 (32)	−0.6 (30.9)	0 (32)	2.8 (37.0)	6.5 (43.7)	9.9 (49.8)	12.8 (55.0)	12.2 (54.0)	9.4 (48.9)	5.2 (41.4)	2.6 (36.7)	1 (34)	5.2 (41.3)
Average precipitation mm (inches)	203 (8.0)	174 (6.9)	161 (6.3)	93 (3.7)	74 (2.9)	45 (1.8)	38 (1.5)	78 (3.1)	123 (4.8)	161 (6.3)	173 (6.8)	223 (8.8)	1,546 (60.9)
Source: Norwegian Meteorological Institute

== Media ==
The newspaper Lofot-Tidende has been published in Leknes since 1987.
