= Ballangen =

Ballangen may refer to:

== Places ==
- Ballangen (village), a village in Narvik Municipality in Nordland county, Norway
- Ballangen Municipality, a former municipality in Nordland county, Norway
- Ballangen Church, a church in Narvik Municipality in Nordland county, Norway
- Ballangen Museum, a museum in Narvik Municipality in Nordland county, Norway
- Ballangen (fjord), a small fjord that branches off the main Ofotfjorden in Narvik Municipality in Nordland county, Norway
