= William Hakvaag =

Norwegian collector and museum director born 1948

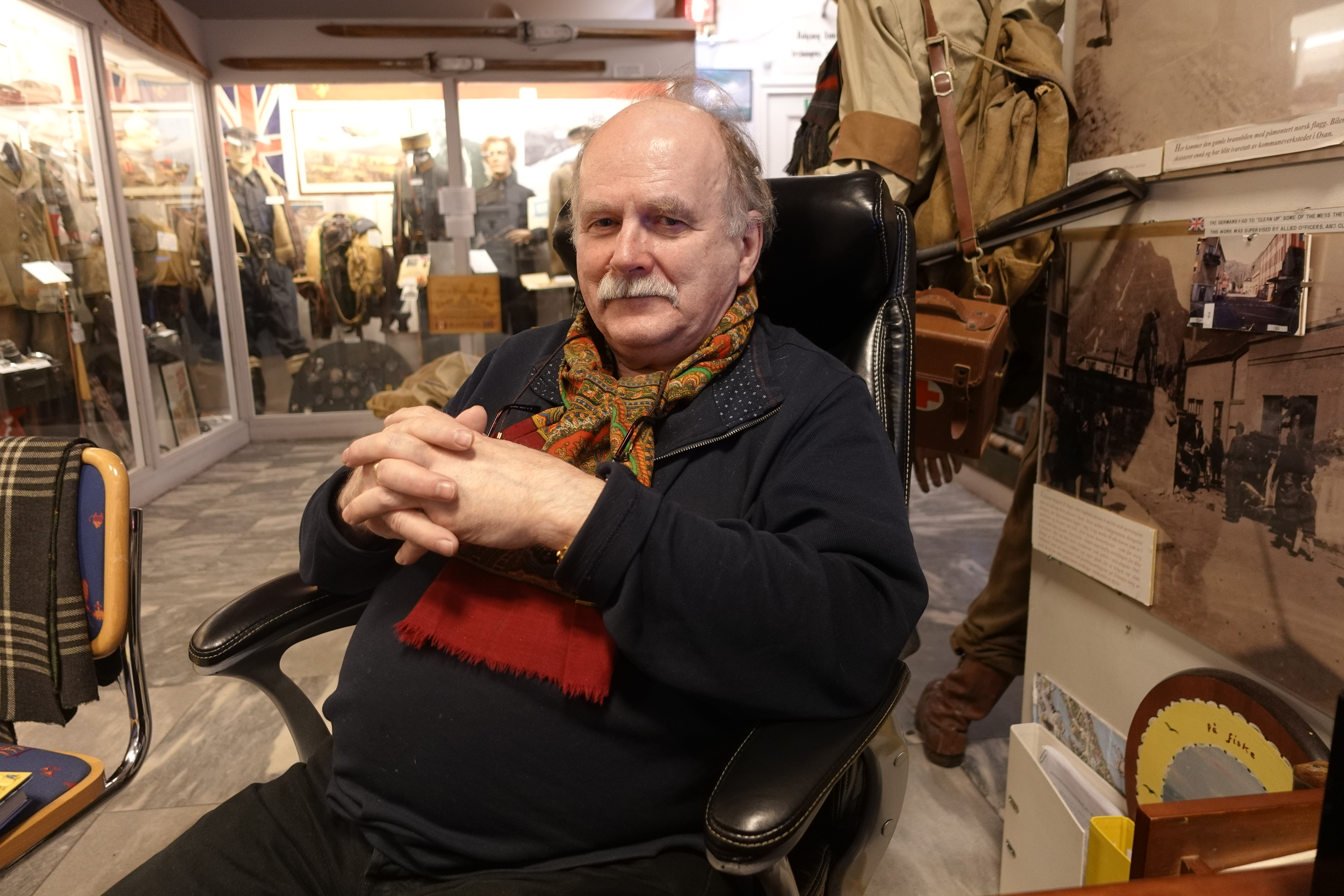

William Rolf Hakvaag (born 13 December 1948 in Svolvær, Norway) is a Norwegian museum director and former musician.

== Career ==
In the 1960s and 1970s, Hakvaag was a solo guitarist in several pop groups and rock bands, including Zoo (1966-1968 and 1971–1976), Outlaws (1967), and Prudence (1971).

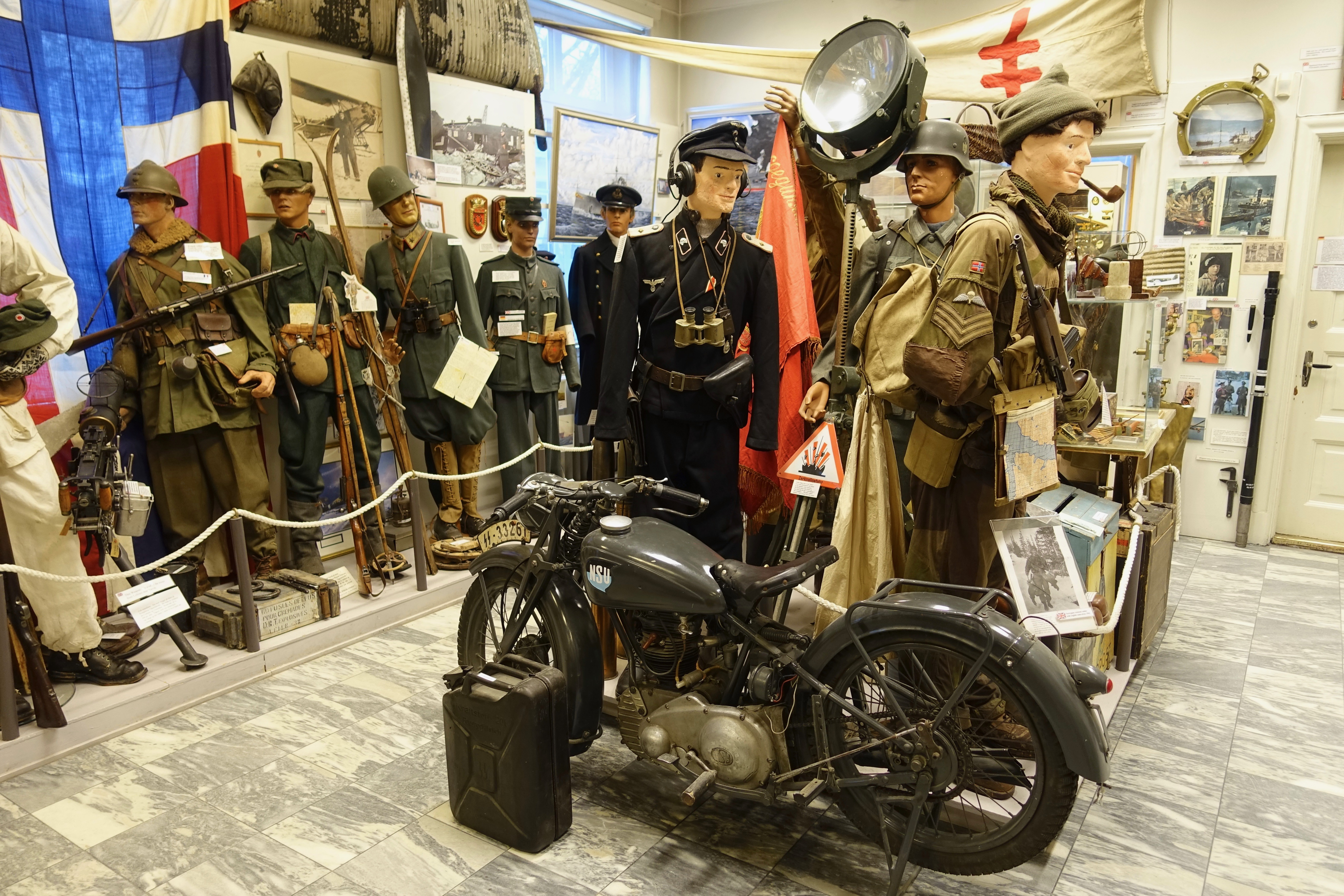
In 1996, William Hakvaag established the Lofoten War Memorial Museum in Svolvær, Norway based on his private collection of militaria. The museum contains Norway's largest collection of uniforms and smaller objects from World War II.

In 1996, the Lofoten War Memorial Museum in Svolvær was opened, an institution that William Hakvaag initiated and founded. The museum displays Hakvaag's extensive private collection of military and civilian items from World War II in Norway, including 140 uniforms. In 2010, the war museum became part of the Museum Nord.

William Haakvaag was awarded the Vågan Municipality Cultural Prize in 1996, the King's Medal of Merit in silver in 2003, and the Defense Medal with Laurel Branch in 2017. In 2022, he received a plaque from the Ministry of Defense with recognition from the government for his efforts as a mediator of war history.

Hakvaag published his books Vi som ikke ble berømt ("We Who Did Not Become Famous") in 2010, De utrolige bildene ("The Incredible Pictures") in 2013, and Gjennom Leicas linser: Det tredje riket og 2. verdenskrig fotografert ("Through the Lenses of Leica: The Third Reich and World War II Photographed") in 2019.
