= Museum Nord =

Norwegian museum consortium

Coordinates: 68°30′14″N 14°47′59″E

Museum Nord is a Norwegian museum consortium for the northern part of Nordland county, including the districts of Lofoten, Vesterålen, and Ofoten. The museum is set up as a foundation and was established on December 13, 2002. It opened in 2004 and it is one of three museum consortia in Nordland; the other two are the Helgeland Museum and the Nordland Museum.

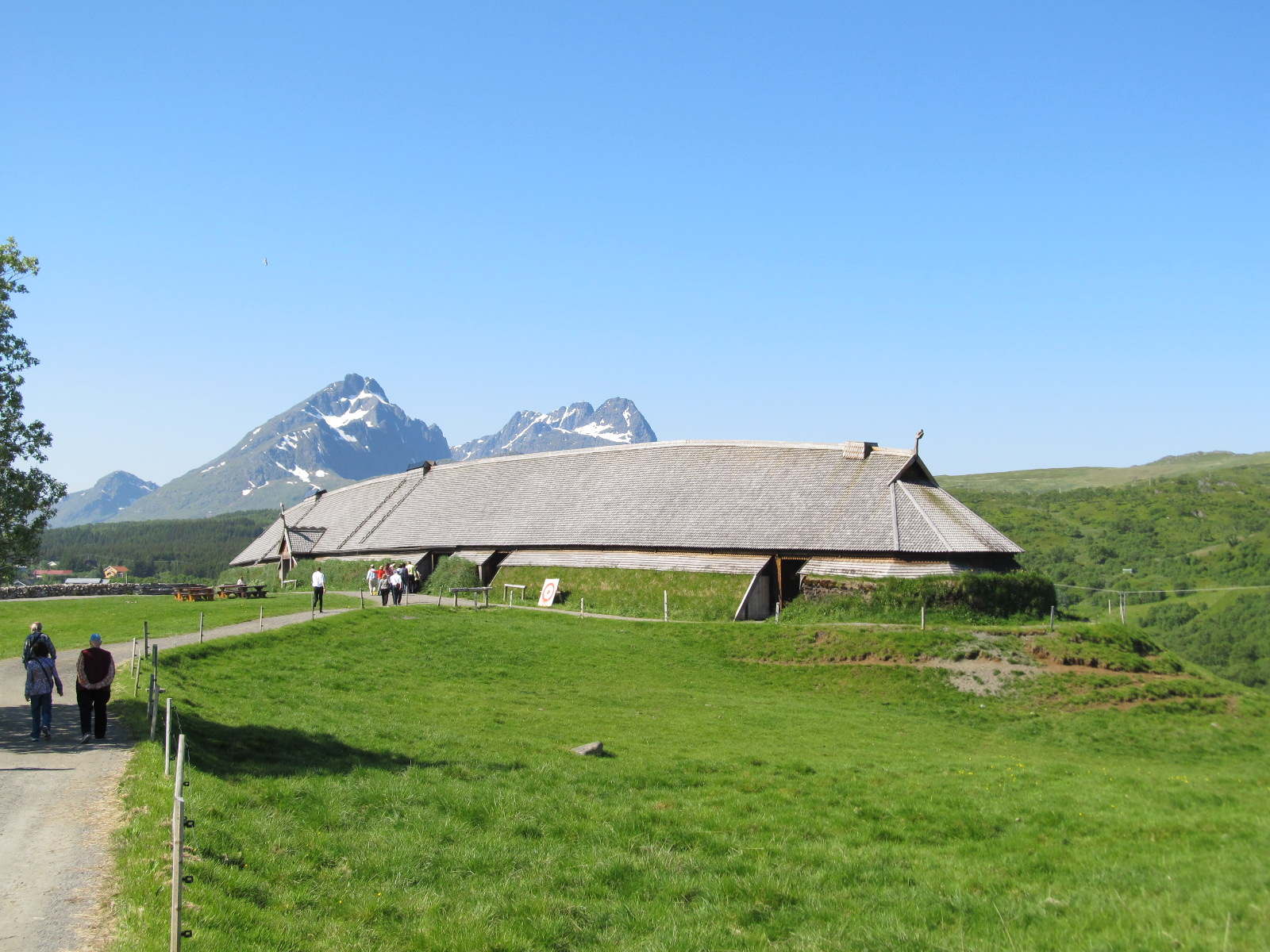
The reconstructed longhouse at the Lofotr Viking Museum in Borg on Vestvågøya

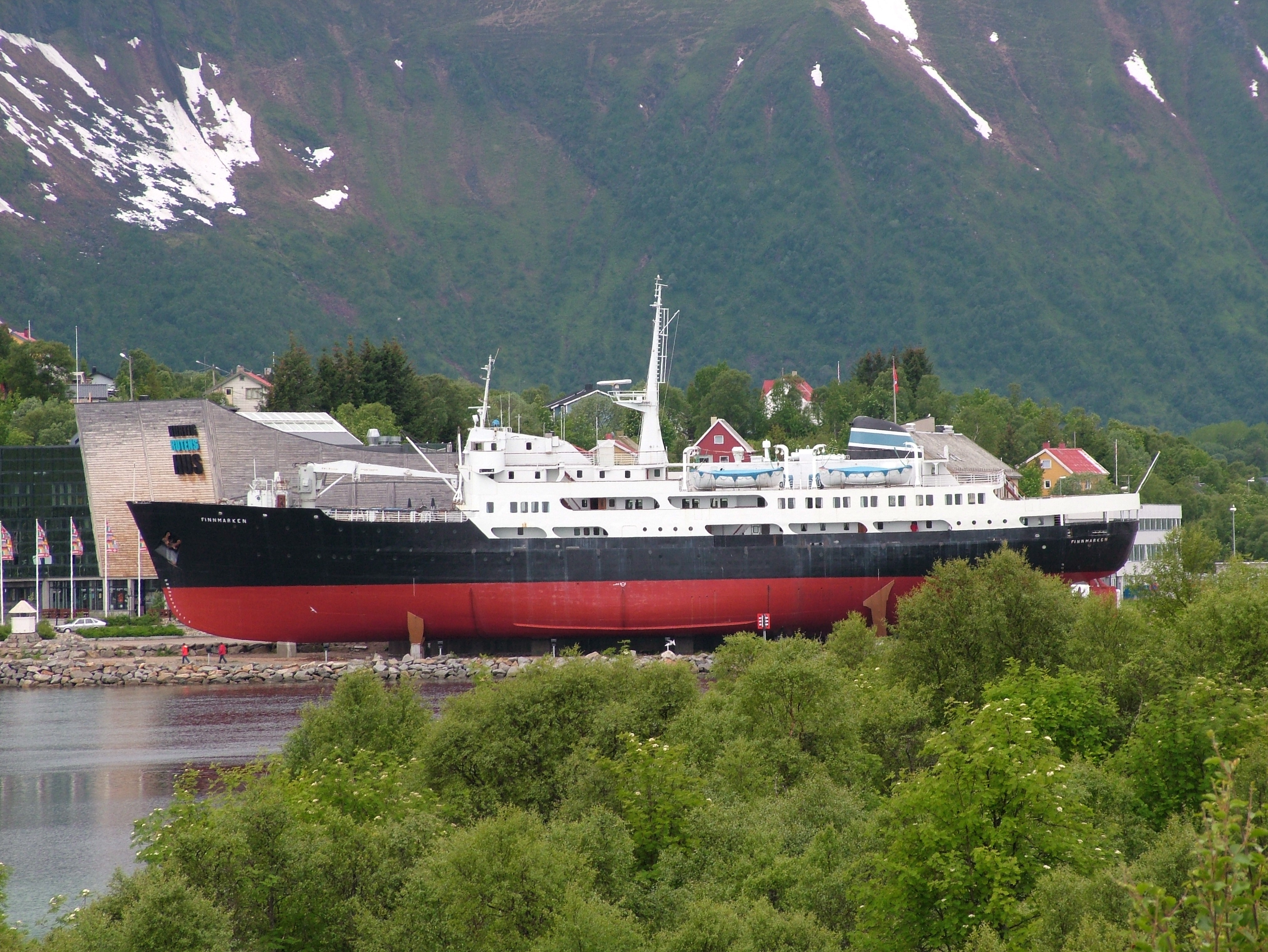
MS Finnmarken is part of the Coastal Express Museum in Stokmarknes in Hadsel Municipality.

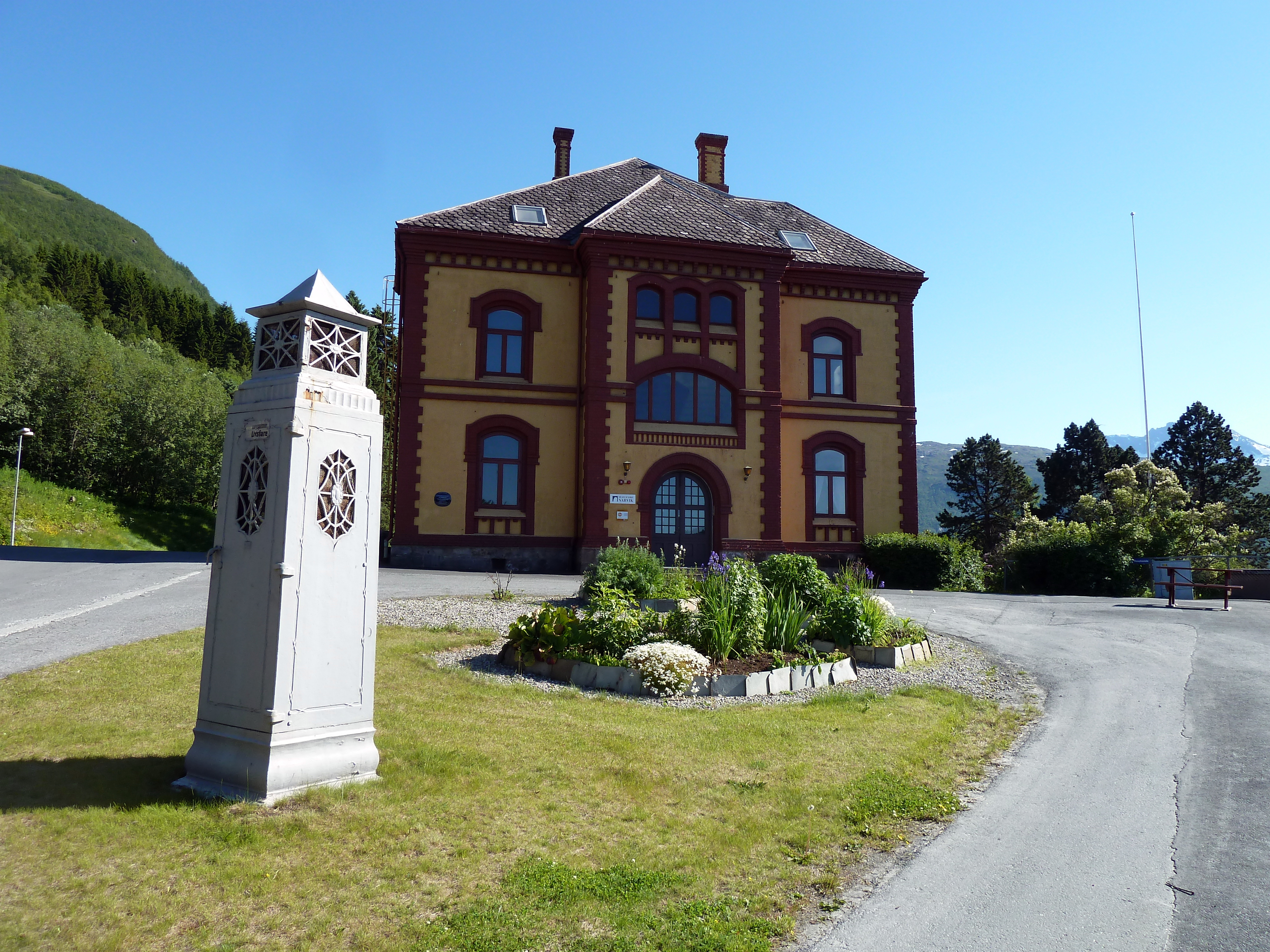
Museum Nord, Narvik in the former NSB administration building in Narvik Municipality

The museum unit has about 53 permanent employees and 13 full-time-equivalent positions through the company Lofotr Næringsdrift AS, which is wholly owned by Museum Nord. Museum Nord's administration is located at Melbu in Hadsel Municipality (staff and archives) and Borg in Vestvågøy Municipality (business and marketing). The director of the museum unit, with offices in Melbu, is Geir Are Johansen.

The museums included in Museum Nord receive 60% operating support from the state, 20% from the county, and 20% from their municipality.

== Units ==
Museum Nord has 21 units divided in 11 municipalities. The Lofotr Viking Museum was originally a separate museum, with the same status as Museum Nord, the Nordland Museum, and the Helgeland Museum, but it was later made a unit of Museum Nord.

- The Andøy Museum (Andøymuseet) in Andøy Municipality
- The Ballangen Museum in Ballangen in Narvik Municipality
- The Bø Museum in Bø Municipality
- The Coastal Express Museum in Hadsel Municipality
- The Espolin Gallery in Vågan Municipality
- The Lofoten War Memorial Museum (Lofoten Krigsminnemuseum) in Vågan Municipality
- The Lofotr Viking Museum (Lofotr Vikingmuseum) in Vestvågøy Municipality
- Museum Nord, Narvik (formerly the Ofoten Museum) in Narvik Municipality
- Museum Nord, Tysfjord (formerly the Tysfjord Museum) in Hamarøy Municipality, with departments in Tysfjord and Korsnes
- The Norwegian Fishing Industry Museum (Norsk Fiskeindustrimuseum) in Hadsel Municipality
- The Norwegian Fishing Village Museum (Norsk Fiskeværsmuseum) in Moskenes Municipality
- The Øksnes Museum in Øksnes Municipality
- The SKREI Heritage Center (SKREI Opplevelsessenter), which includes the Lofoten Aquarium (Lofotakvariet), Espolin Gallery, and Lofoten Museum (Lofotmuseet) in Vågan Municipality. The Lofoten Museum is part of the Coastal Administration Museum (Kystverksmusea).
- The Sortland Museum in Sortland Municipality
- The Sørvågen branch of the Norwegian Telecom Museum (Telemuseet) in Moskenes Municipality
- The Vesterålen Museum (Vesterålsmuseet) in Hadsel Municipality
- The Vestvågøy Museum in Vestvågøy Municipality (The Skaftnes Farm and Fygle Museum, Skaftnes Gård & Fygle museum)
