= Kabelvåg =

Village in Vågan Municipality, Norway

Kabelvåg: Kabelvåg (Norwegian); Gábelváhke (Lule Sami); Gávvalváhki (Northern Sami)
- Village
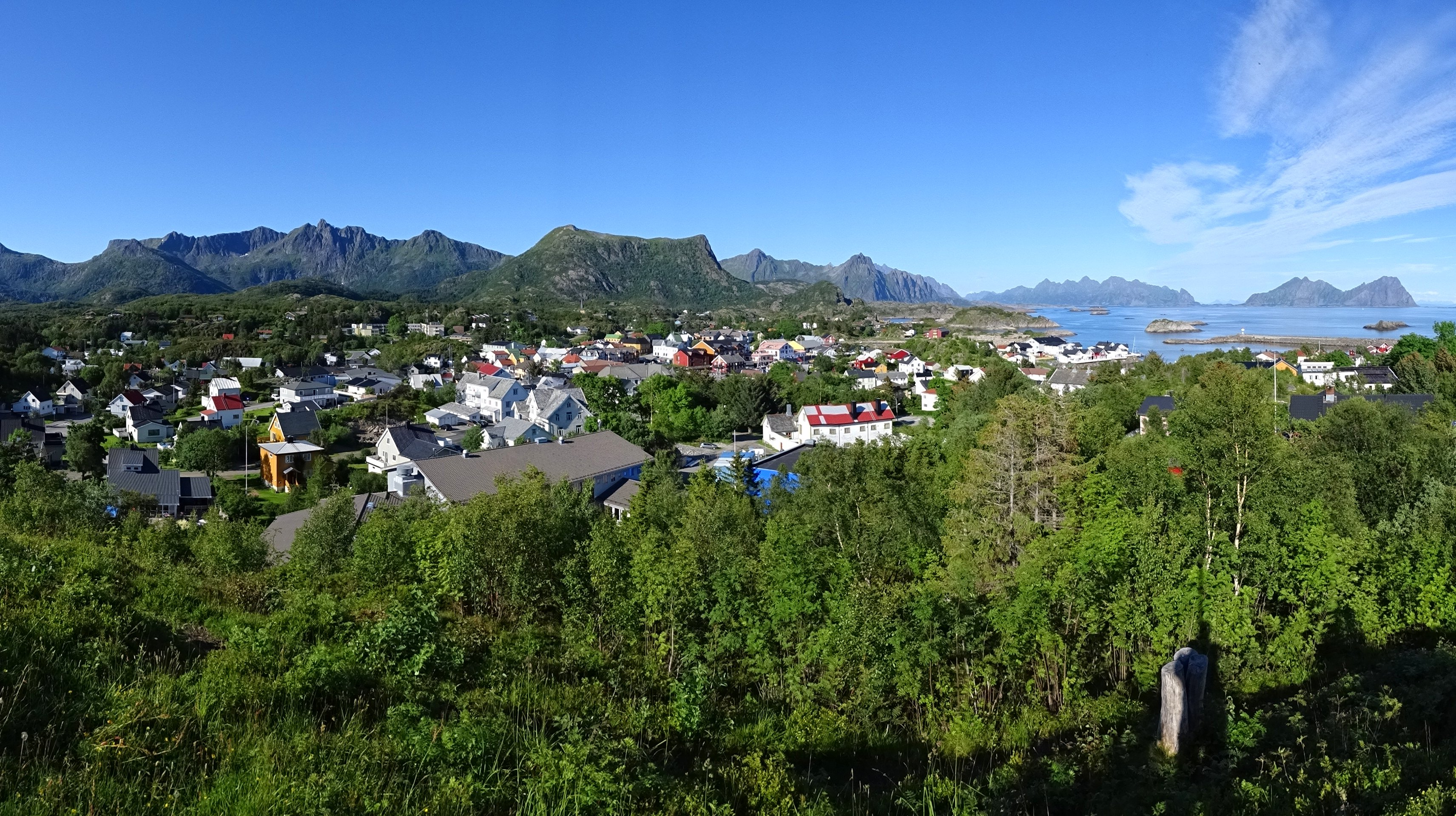
- Kabelvåg
- Interactive map of Kabelvåg
- Location within Nordland Location within Norway
- Coordinates: 68.2107°N 14.4755°E
- Country: Norway
- Region: Northern Norway
- County: Nordland
- District: Lofoten
- Municipality: Vågan Municipality

Area
  - Total: 1.37 km^{2} (0.53 sq mi)
- Elevation: 4 m (13 ft)

Population (2023)
  - Total: 2,291
  - Density: 1,672/km^{2} (4,330/sq mi)
- Time zone: UTC+01:00 (CET)
  - Summer (DST): UTC+02:00 (CEST)
- Post Code: 8310 Kabelvåg

Kabelvåg (Norwegian), Gábelváhke (Lule Sami), or Gávvalváhki (Northern Sami) is a village in Vågan Municipality in Nordland county, Norway. It is located on the southern shore of the island of Austvågøya in the Lofoten archipelago. Kabelvåg lies about 5 kilometres (3.1 mi) to the southwest of the town of Svolvær, the administrative centre of Vågan Municipality. The 1.37-square-kilometre (340-acre) village has a population (2023) of 2,291 and a population density of 1,672 inhabitants per square kilometre (4,330/sq mi).

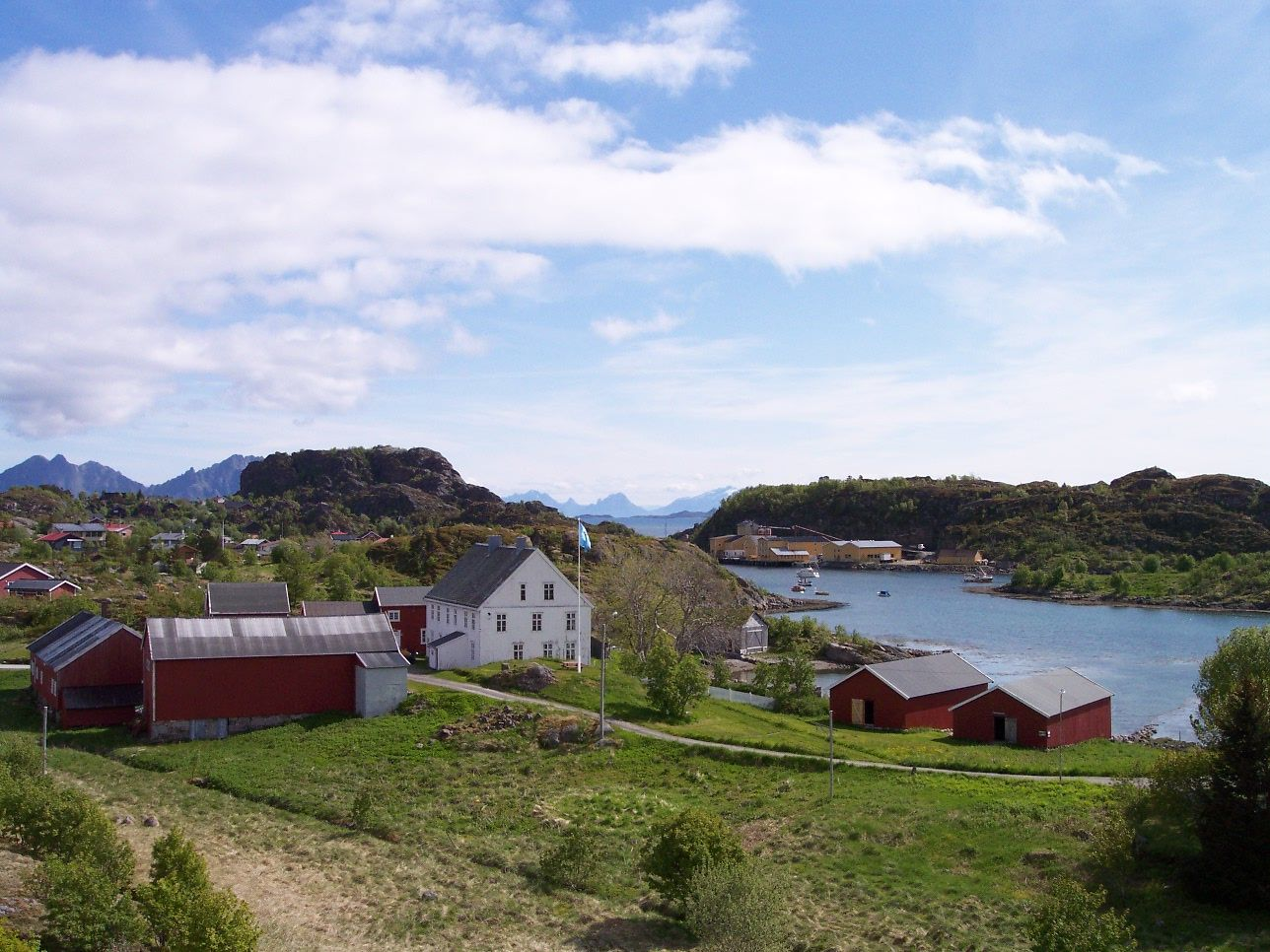
Lofoten Museum in Kabelvåg

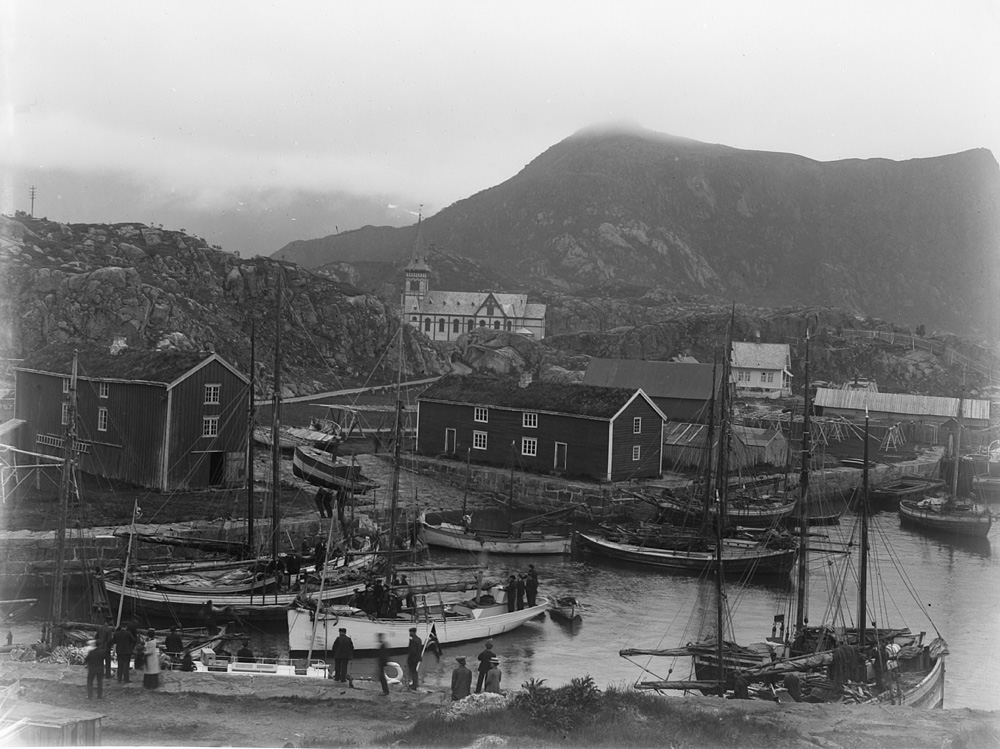
"Finnespollen, Kabelvaag, Nordlands amt"

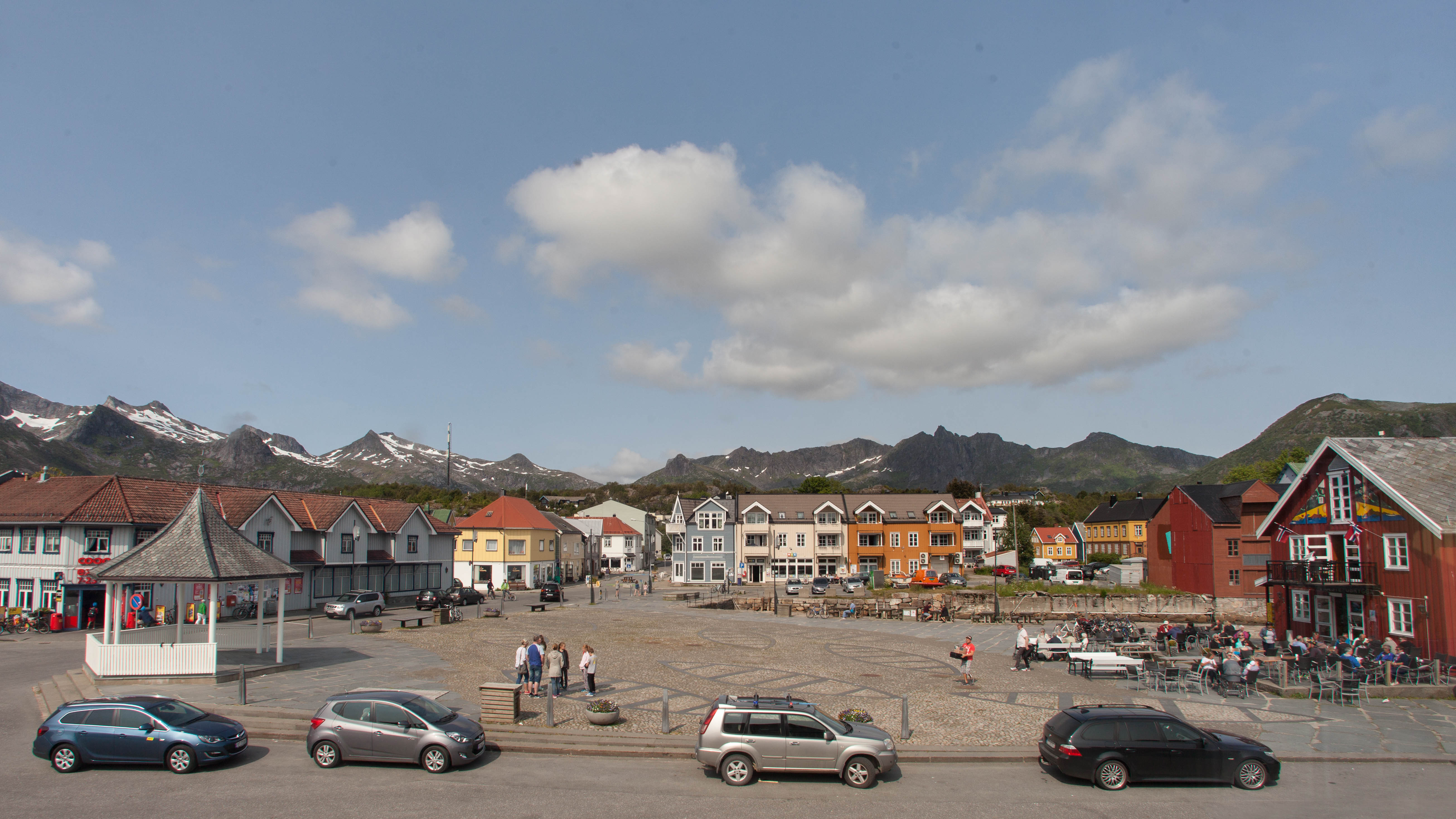
Kabelvåg town square

The village was founded as "Vågan" in the early 12th century by King Øystein Magnusson, who built a church and a fishermen's hostel there. According to the Heimskringla, there was something resembling a town there several centuries earlier — the first known town in North Norway, known as "Vågar".

There are several attractions in Kabelvåg: the Lofoten Museum, Lofoten Aquarium, and Espolin Gallery. Vågan Church (also known as the Lofoten Cathedral) is located in Kabelvåg. The European route E10 highway runs through the village.

The education sector includes a college for film and other art forms: Nordland kunst- og filmhøgskole (NKFS).

== History ==
The oldest traces of settlement in Kabelvåg are from the late Stone Age, with possible traces of human activity going as far back as the early Stone Age. There are only sparse traces of settlements in the area now known as Kabelvåg during the Iron Age.

A couple of kilometers west of the present-day center of Kabelvåg, Vágar existed as a city between 1000 and 1400. It was Northern Norway's first city. During the Middle Ages the settlement known as Vågan experienced a rise in importance. This happens mostly because of the seasonal fishing, "Lofotfisket", which mostly takes part in an area of the sea known as Hølla, located between modern day Kabelvåg, Svolvær, and Skrova.

== Lofotfiske ==
The Lofoten area is the spawning grounds for the northern Atlantic cod. When spawning season begins, it creates an extreme increase in the activity of the fishing industry. A result of the "Lofotfiske" event, a great need for storage arises, as the fish is processed and cured in large amounts. This led to the drying and salting of fish. Due to the special weather of the Lofoten islands, it is an ideal place to make the product known as tørrfisk (English: dried fish).

During the Middle Ages, dried fish became a very important commodity in the Catholic countries of Southern Europe, and the backbone of the local economy. According to historians, dried cod from Nordland in the 13th century accounted for 80 percent of all of Norway's exports.

== Notable residents ==
- Thor Erdahl, a Norwegian painter
- Stig Johansen, a Norwegian footballer
