= Espolin Gallery =

Art gallery in Storvågan, Norway

Coordinates: 68°12′29″N 14°27′05″E

The Espolin Gallery (Norwegian: Galleri Espolin) is an art gallery in Storvågan near Kabelvåg in Vågan Municipality, Norway.

The gallery was established in 1992 to display the works of the artist Kaare Espolin Johnson. In addition to Espolin Johnson's works, the gallery also displays works by other artists. The gallery is now part of the SKREI Heritage Center (SKREI Opplevelsessenter) at Museum Nord.

== Architecture ==
The building was designed by the architect Gisle Jakhelln. He took his inspiration from traditional Icelandic construction because Espolin Johnson had Icelandic ancestors. In June 2006, the gallery was expanded with a new wing measuring around 164 square meters (1,770 sq ft). The gallery received financial support for the expansion from the Arts Council Norway, Nordland County Council, Vågan Municipality, and the Sparebanken Nord-Norge bank.
