= Lofotr Viking Museum =

Viking age museum at Lofoten, Norway

- Lofotr Vikingmuseum
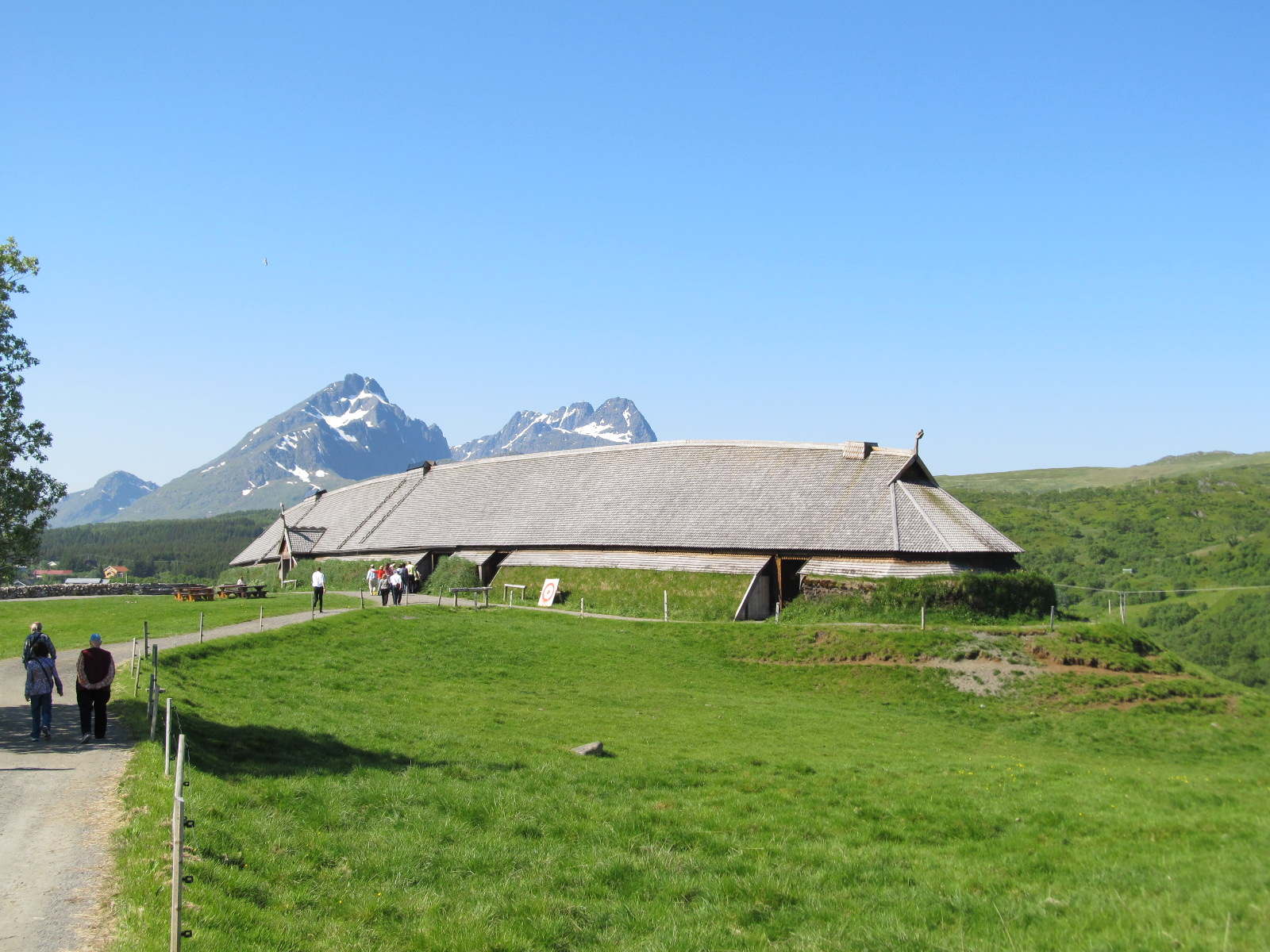
- Lofotr Viking Museum
- Established: 1995
- Location: Borg, Vestvågøy
- Coordinates: 68.2400°N 13.7531°E
- Website: lofotr.no/en/

The Lofotr Viking Museum (Norwegian: Lofotr Vikingmuseum) is a historical museum based on a reconstruction and archaeological excavation of a Viking chieftain's village on the island of Vestvågøya in the Lofoten archipelago in Nordland county, Norway. It is located in the small village of Borg, near Bøstad, in Vestvågøy Municipality. It is part of the Museum Nord consortium.

== History ==
In 1983, archaeologists uncovered the Chieftain House at Borg (På Borg på Vestvågøya i Lofoten), a large Viking Age building believed to have been already established around the year 500 AD. In the 8th century it was rebuilt and enlarged. The reconstructed building represents this 8th-century building. A joint Scandinavian research project was conducted at Borg from 1986 until 1989. Excavations revealed the largest building ever to be found from the Viking period in Norway. The foundation of the Chieftain House at Borg measured 83 metres (272 ft) long and 9.5 metres (31 ft) wide, and the reconstructed building is 9 metres (30 ft) high. The seat at Borg is estimated to have been abandoned around AD 950.

== Current operation ==
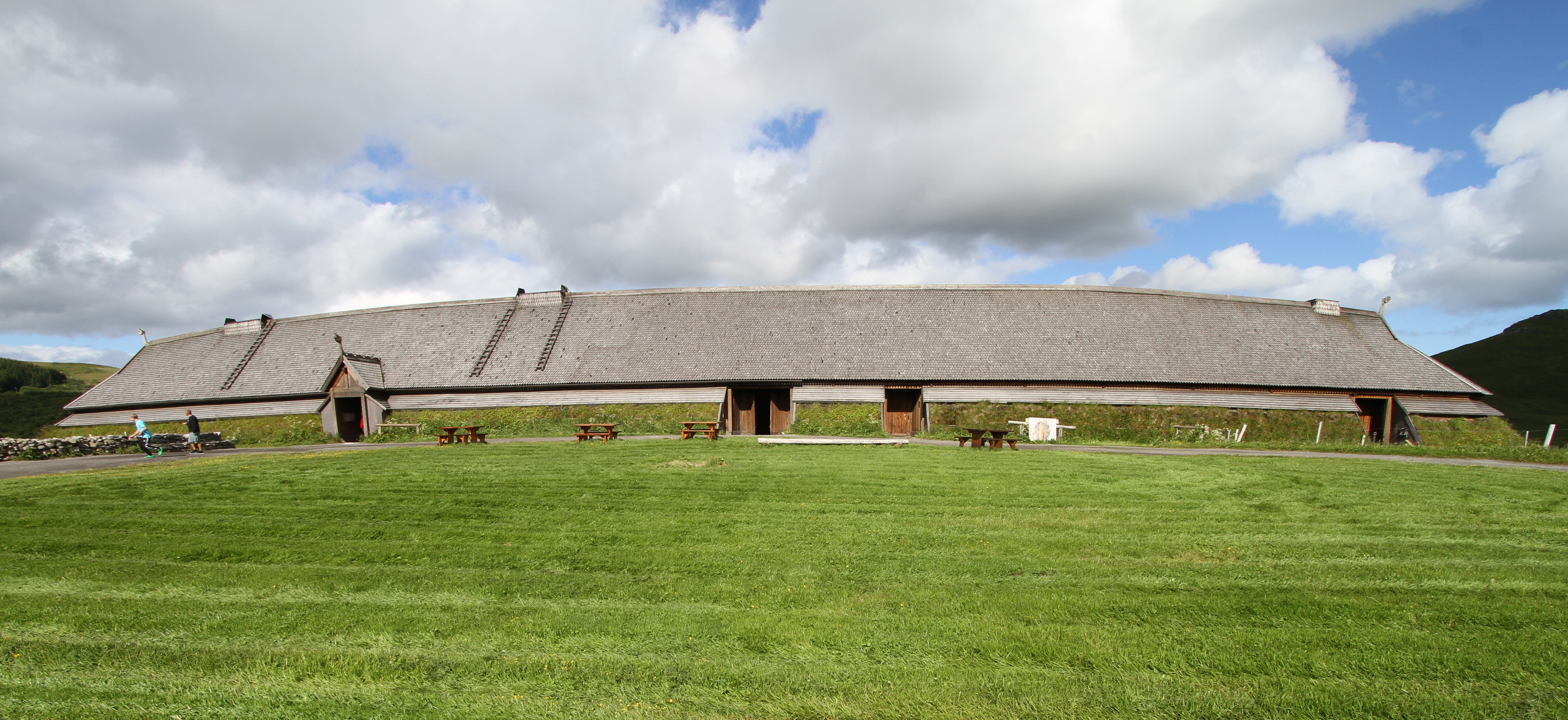
Reconstructed 8th century long-house at Lofotr Viking Museum

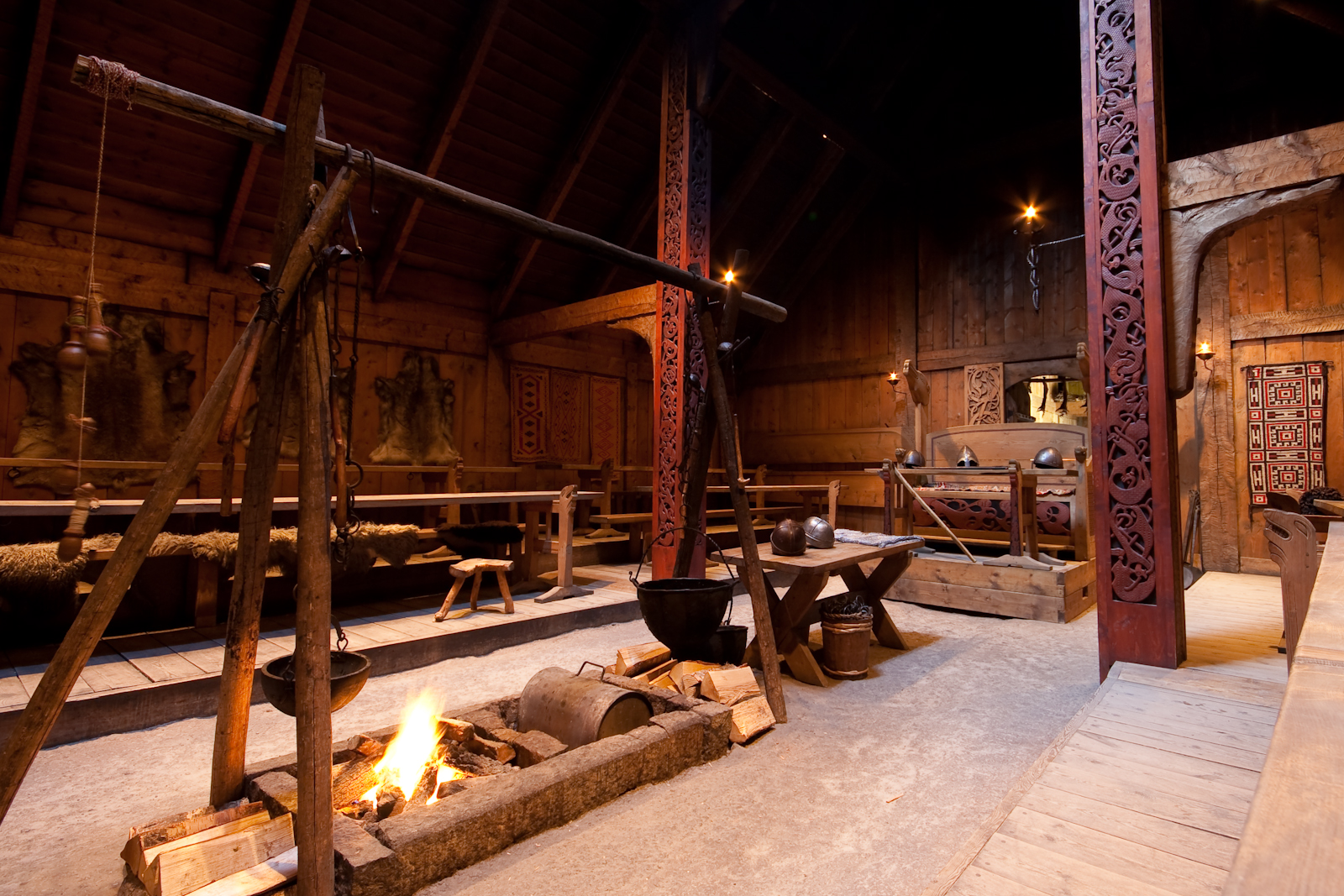
Interior of the Viking Hall

After the excavation ended, the remains of what had once been the long-house remained visible. The long-house has been reconstructed slightly to the north of the excavation site. In 1995, the Lofotr Viking Museum was opened. The museum includes a full reconstruction of the 83-metre (272 ft) long chieftain's house, a blacksmith's forge, two ships (replicas of the Gokstad ship, one in full scale size) and their boathouses, and various reenactments intended to immerse the visitor in life at the time of the Vikings. The main building was designed by Norwegian architect, Gisle Jakhelln.

In September 2006, a planned enlargement of Lofotr, the building of a large amphitheater into the ground between the reception building and the Chieftain House, was postponed because of the archeological findings of some 2,000-year-old cooking sites and pole holes at the site.

Today, the area is excavated and new buildings have been built on the site. This part of the museum comprises 2 permanent exhibition halls and a film theatre. The exhibition halls displays through videos and unique artifacts, the finding and excavation of Borg. Quite a few of the archeological artifacts are of remarkable character. The extensive museum outdoor area is tied together with gravel walking paths, inviting the visitors to explore the history in a greater content than the exhibition halls alone - to see the reconstructed Chieftain´s house on top of the hill, to go on board the Viking ship, to see the surrounding views and try to grasp the value of the landscape and what it offered in the Viking Age - it all adds to the experience.

The museum is open every day from 1 May to 15 September. The administration of Lofotr Viking Museum is located in the former parsonage of the Borge Church.

Lofotr Viking Museum is nominated for Museum of the Year 2011 (in Norway) and the European Museum of the Year Award 2013.

== Trivia ==
The Longhouse served as the Pit Stop of the fourth leg in The Amazing Race 23.

== Gallery ==
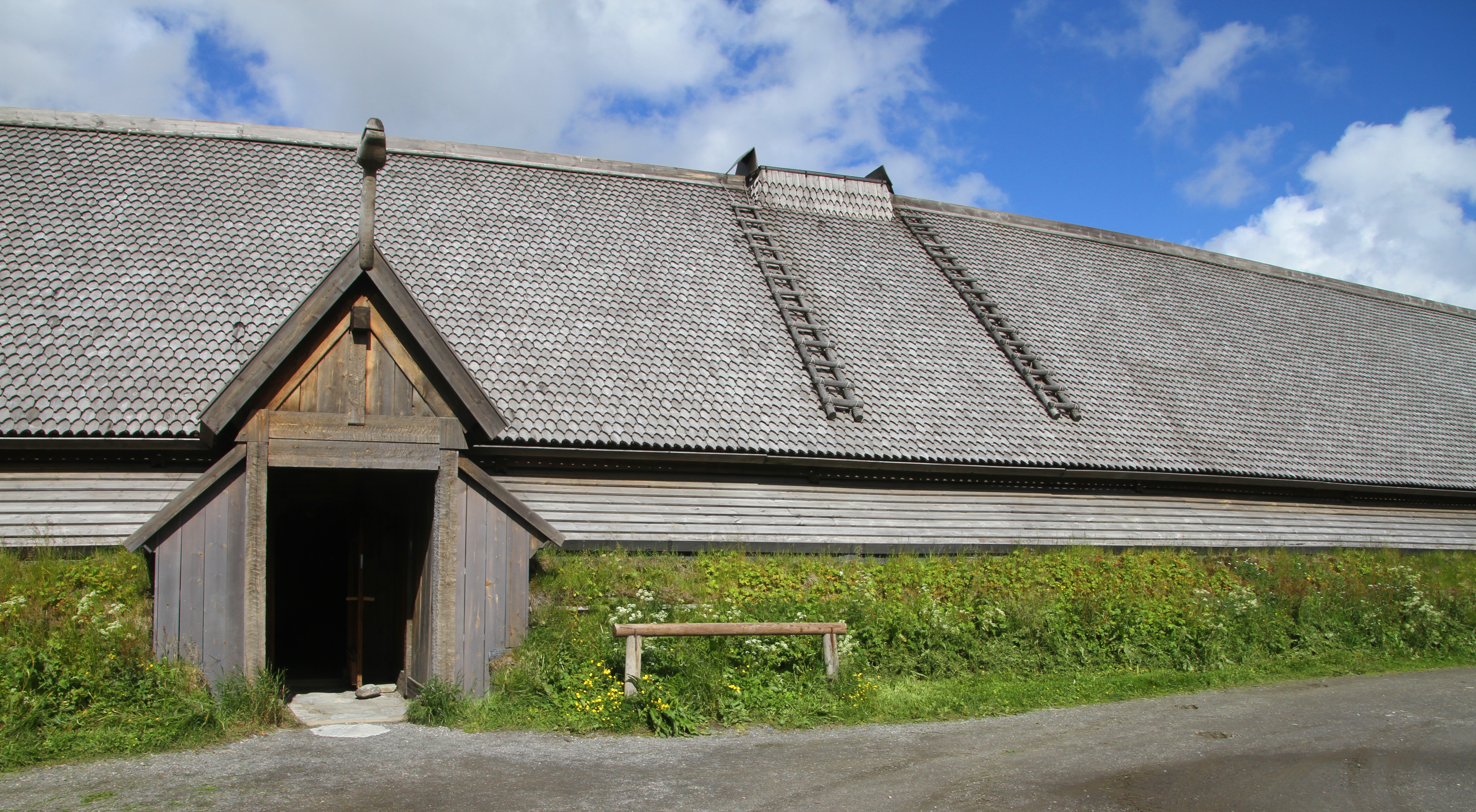
Entrance to the longhouse

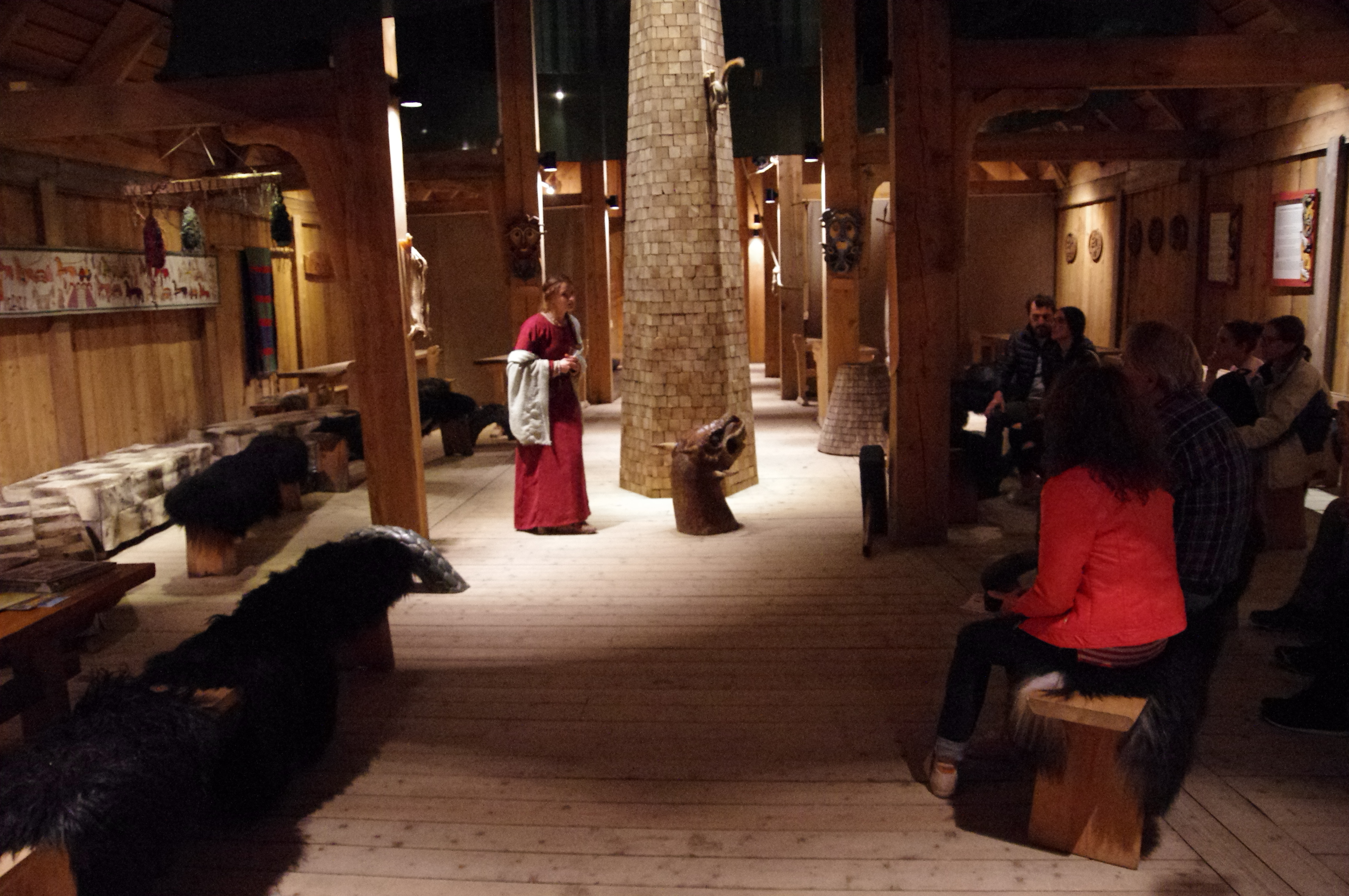
Longhouse interior

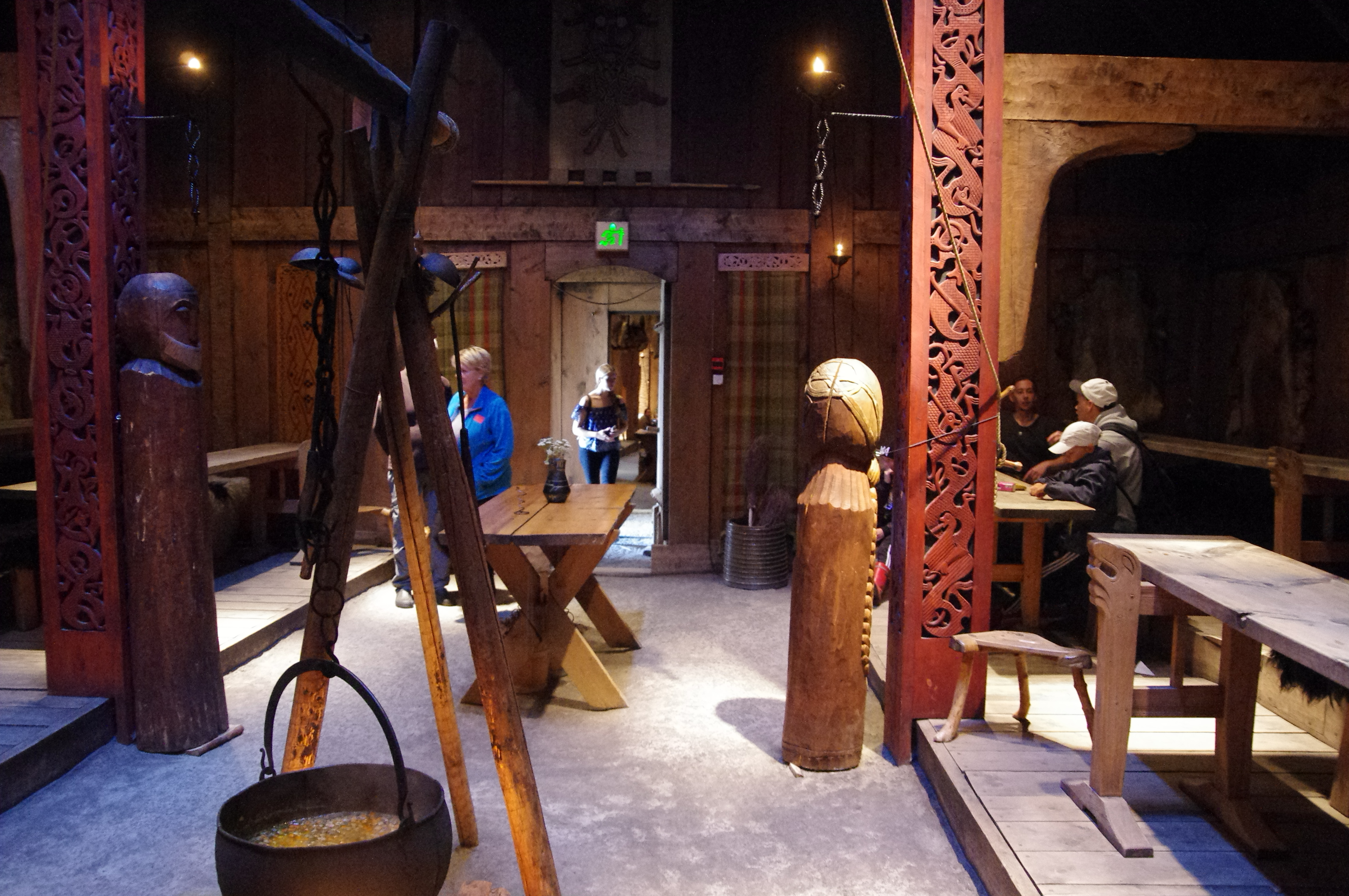
Longhouse interior

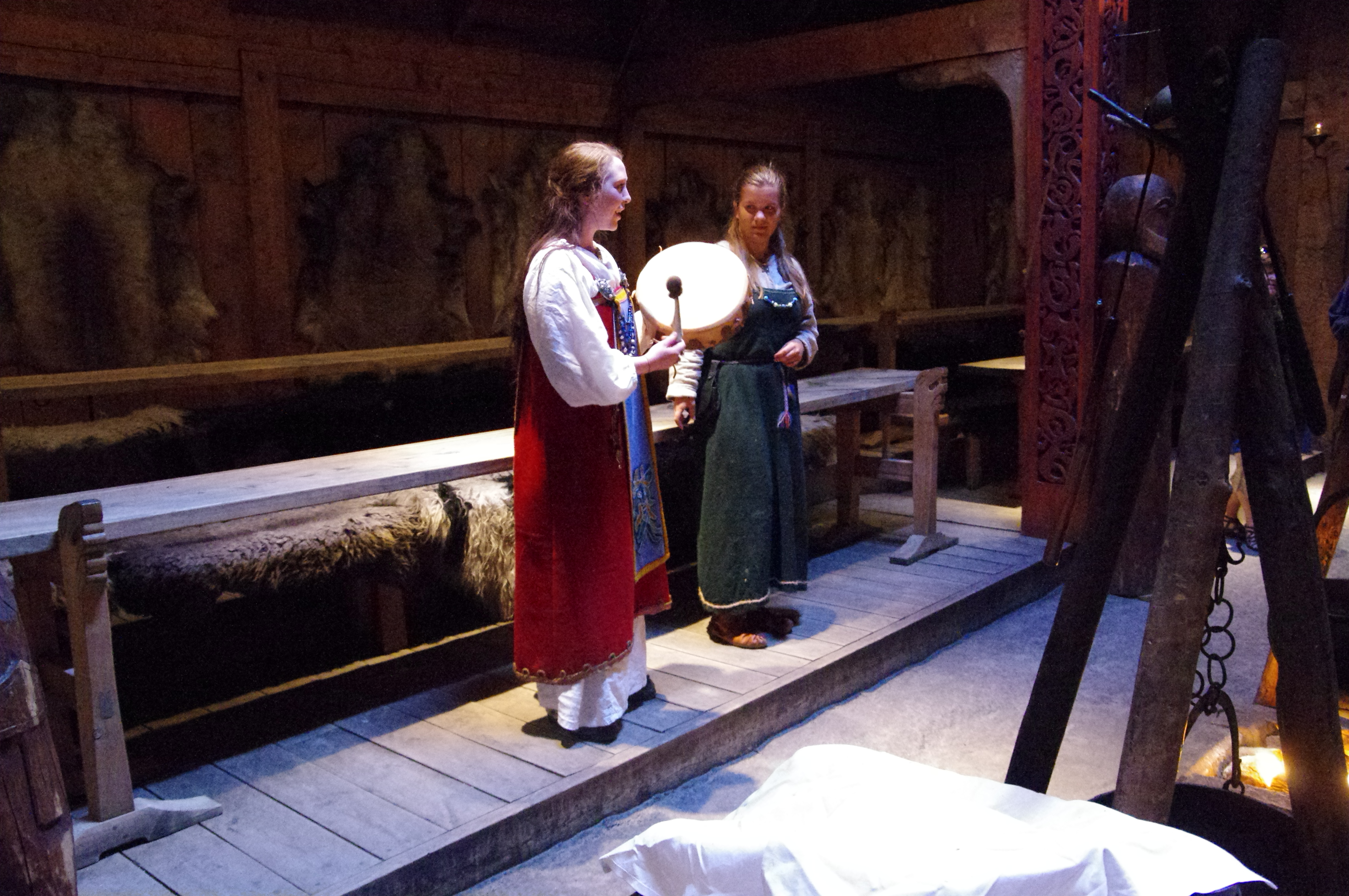
Longhouse interior

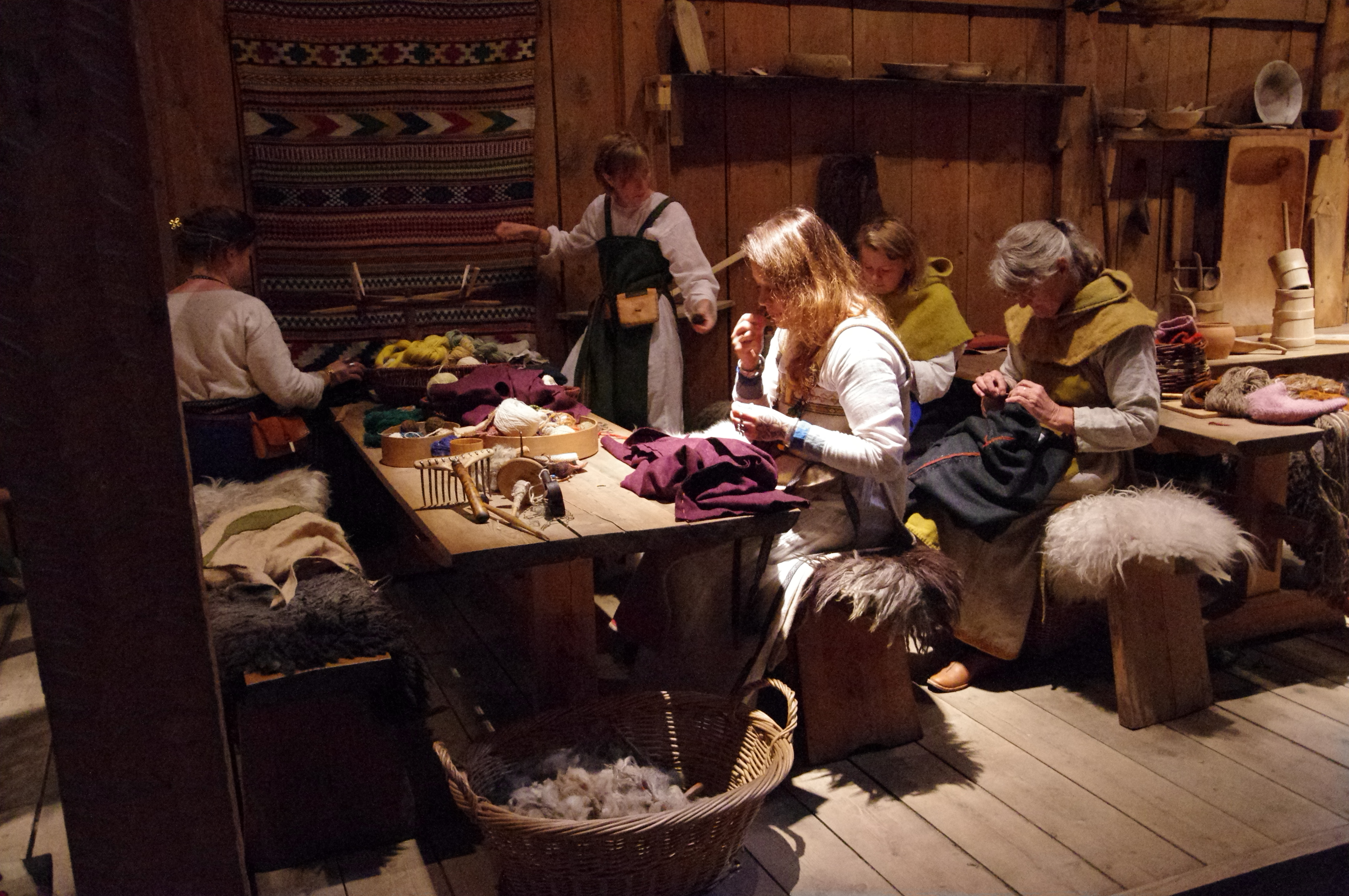
Longhouse interior

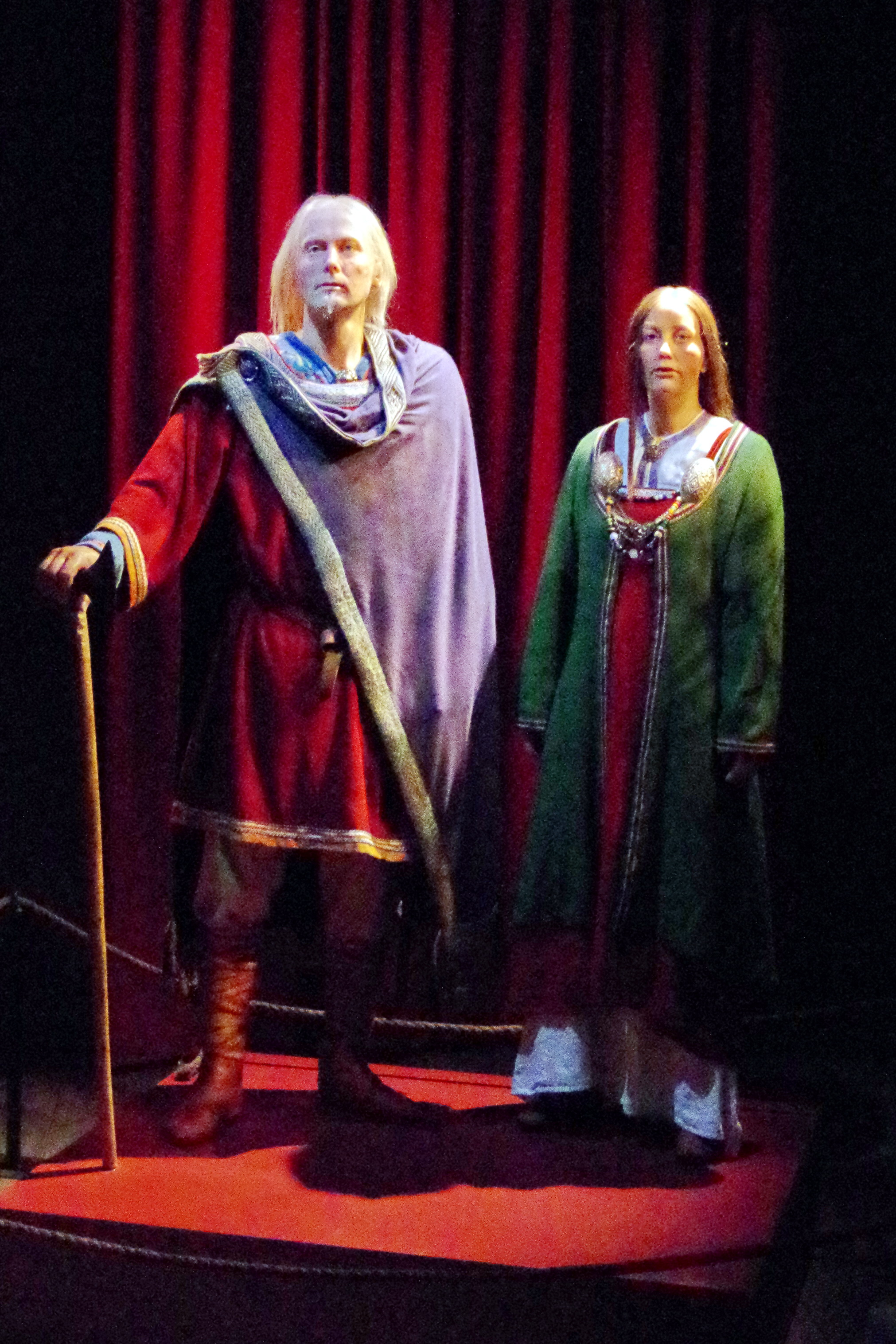
Viking-era clothing

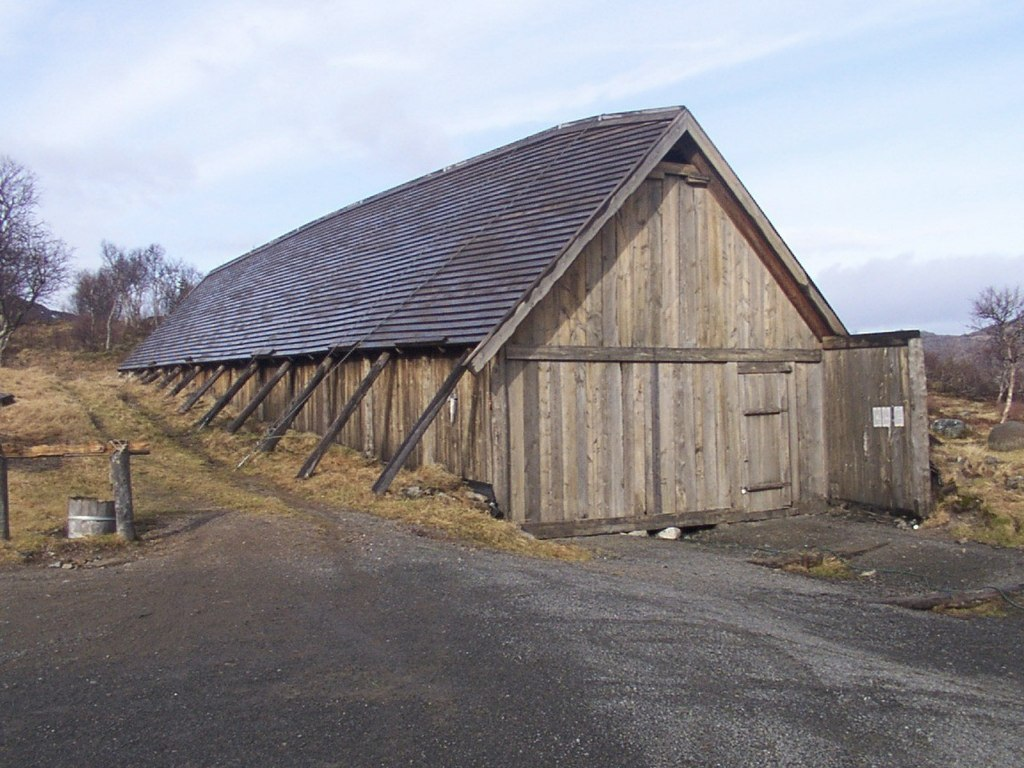
Reconstructed Viking boat house

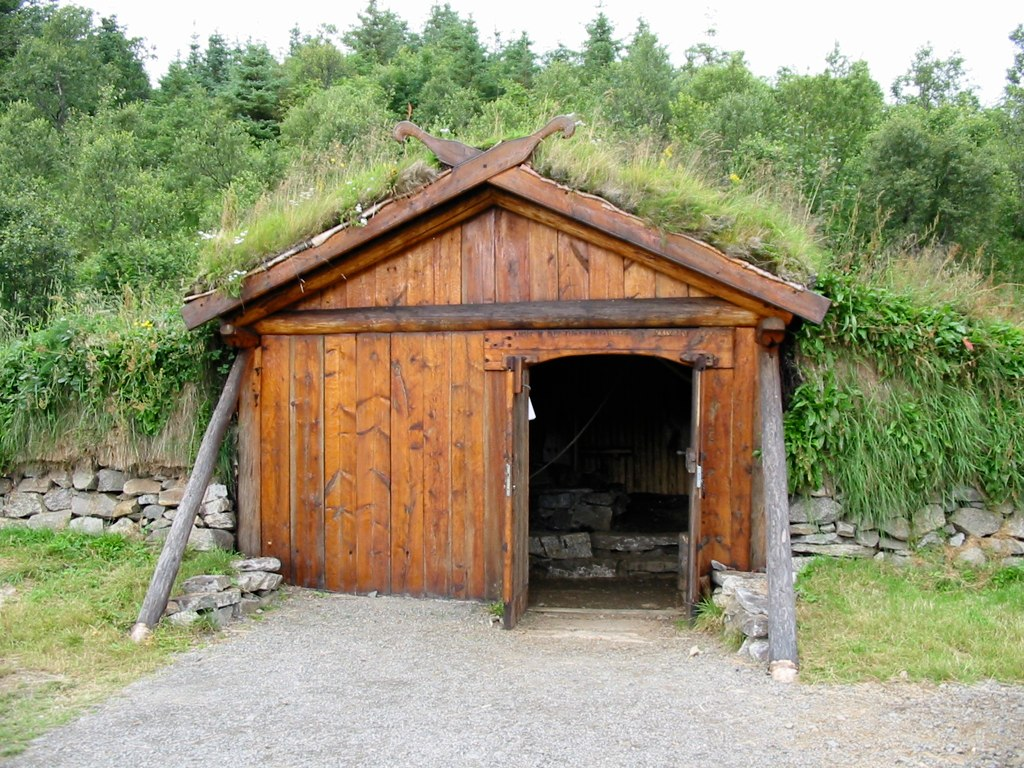
Reconstructed Viking-era smithy

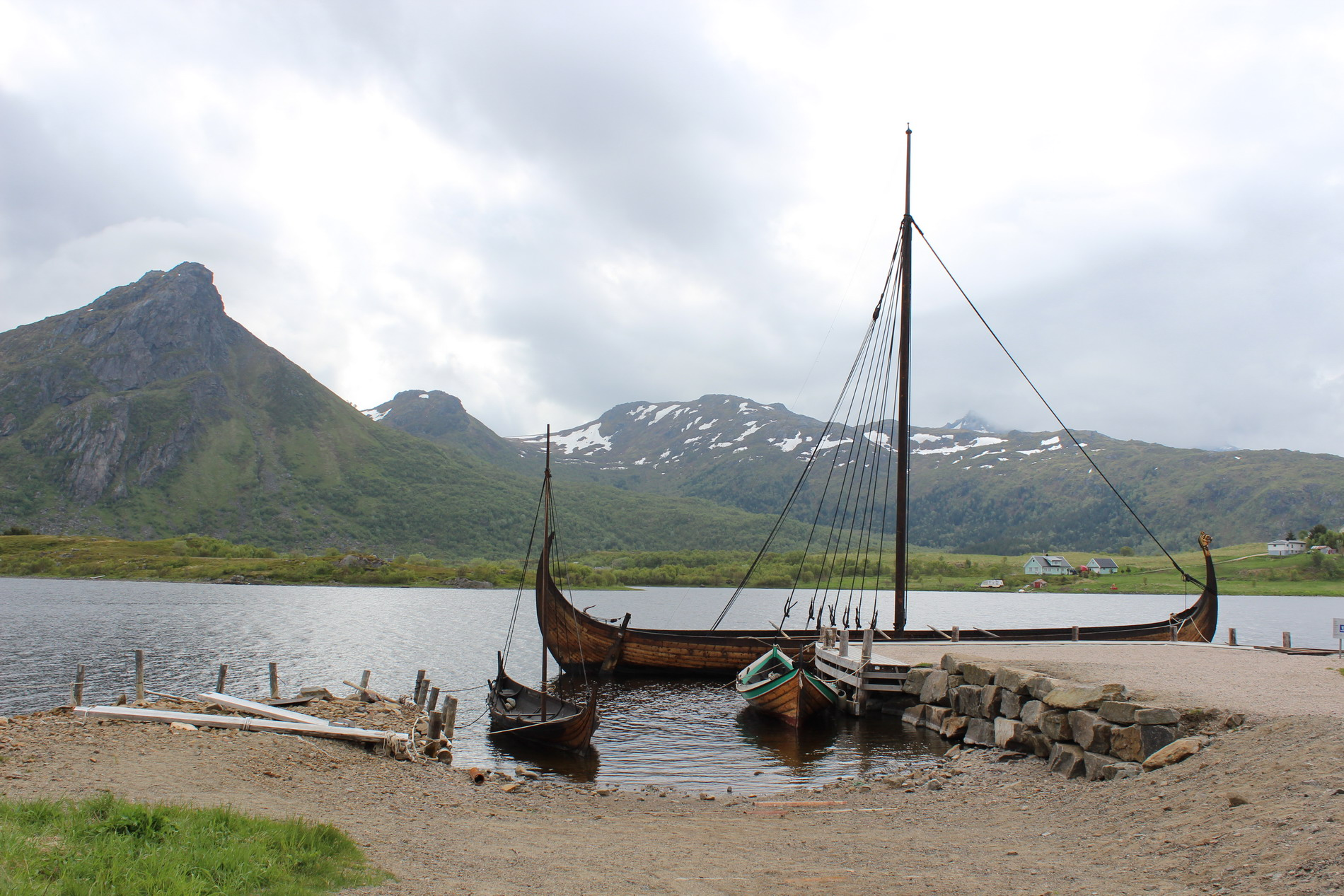
Reconstructed Viking boat

== See also ==
- Hålogaland
- Archaeology of Northern Europe
