= Thor Erdahl =

Norwegian painter (born 1951)

Thor Erdahl (born 22 May 1951) is a Norwegian painter from Kabelvåg in Lofoten. He owns a gallery in Kabelvåg, called Galleri lille Kabelvåg. Erdahl is also the designer of Kabelvåg Torg.
