= Lofoten War Memorial Museum =

Coordinates: 68°13′52″N 14°33′53″E

Lofoten War Memorial Museum Lofoten Krigsminnemuseum
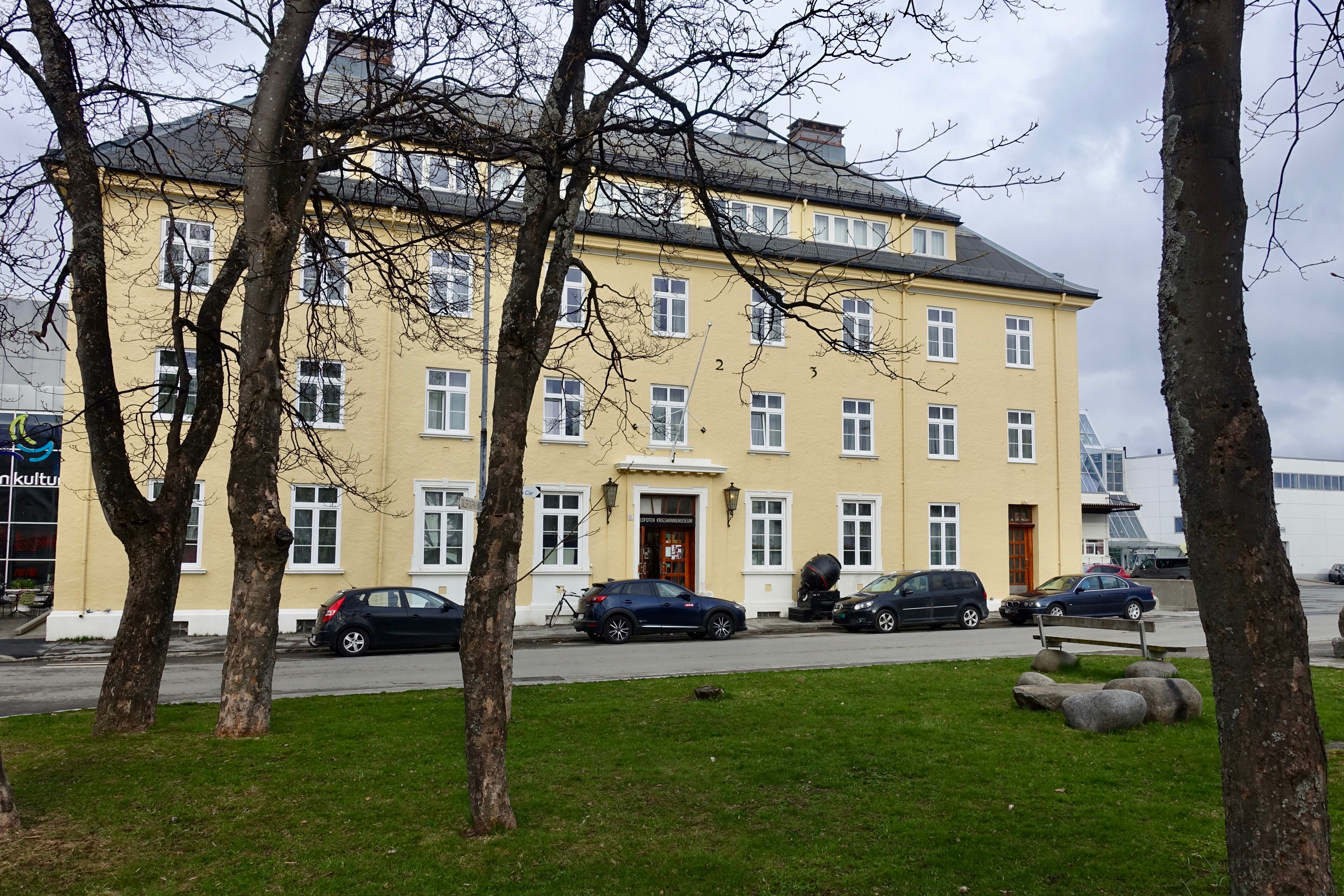
- Established: June 16, 1996; 30 years ago
- Location: Svolvær, Norway
- Type: World War II Museum
- Visitors: 10 000 (2017)
- Director: William Hakvaag
- Website: www.lofotenkrigmus.no

The Lofoten War Memorial Museum (Norwegian: Lofoten Krigsminnemuseum) is a World War II museum located in Svolvær, Norway. It focuses on providing informative content about the Second World War, with a particular emphasis on events that took place in the Lofoten area and Northern Norway during the German occupation of Norway (1940–1945).

The non-partisan museum officially opened on June 15, 1996, after a lengthy period of collection and planning by William Hakvaag (born 1948). The previously privately owned museum has been part of Museum Nord since 2010.

== Exhibits ==
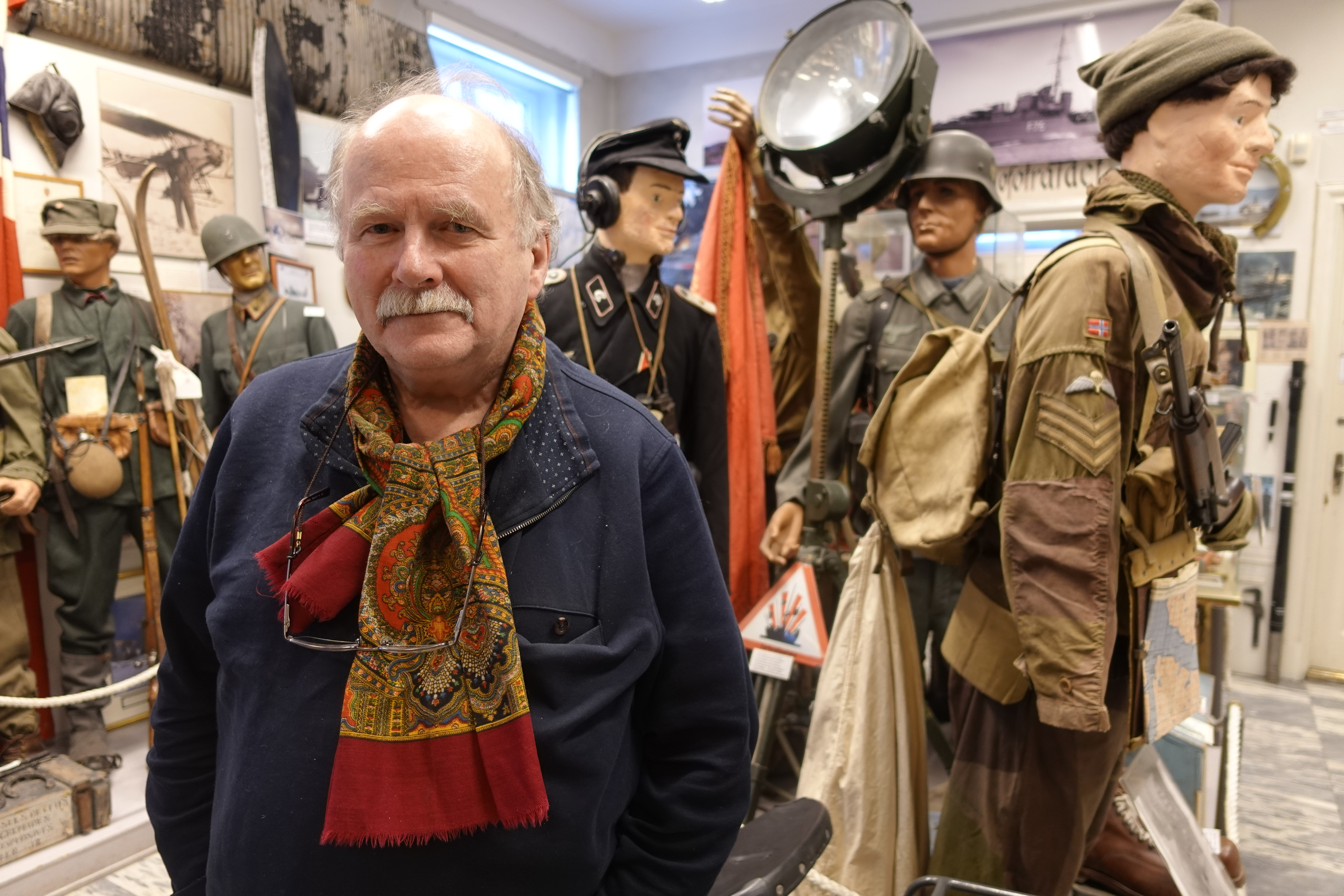
Collector William Hakvaag (born 1948), who opened the museum in Svolvær in 1996, has filled it with militaria from World War II, especially equipment from soldiers who fought in German-occupied Norway (1940–1945). Photo: 2022

The small museum has a diverse collection of military uniforms and equipment as well as smaller objects from World War II. Many of these artifacts are linked to well-known figures and events during the war, such as a peaked cap belonging to Siegfried Wolfgang Fehmer and a jacket belonging to Ernst Weiner, both of whom worked for the Gestapo in Oslo. In addition, the museum showcases peaked caps belonging to General Carl Gustav Fleischer and Birger Eriksen, Reichkommissar Josef Terboven's letter file, lanterns and a compass from Leif Larsen's boats, a lamp from the German battleship Tirpitz, and a case believed to have belonged to Eva Braun.

Furthermore, the museum exhibits curiosities and rare items from everyday life during the war, including cigarette packages and condoms, and even Christmas decorations adorned with Nazi swastikas.

In 2008, Hakvaag acquired a painting that may have been created by Adolf Hitler, with the frame concealing four sketches of Disney cartoon characters signed "A. H."

The museum also has a library of books, printed materials, and photographs from the war.

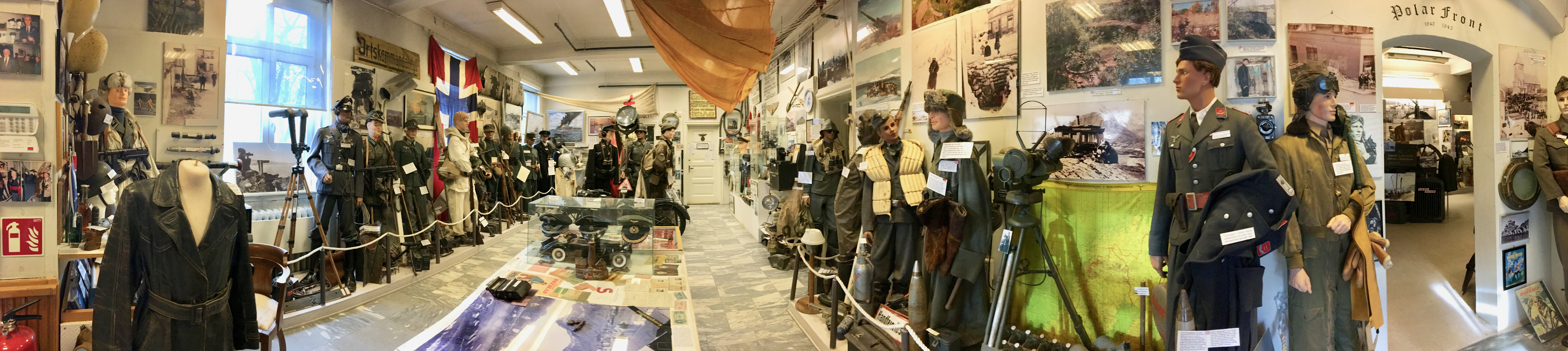
The Lofoten War Memorial Museum exhibits militaria and civilian artifacts related to German-occupied Norway 1940–1945. The small museum has the country's largest exhibition of WWII uniforms, mostly from Third Reich era Germany.
Photo: 2019
