= Museum Nord, Narvik =

Railway museum in Narvik, Norway

Coordinates: 68.4316°N 17.4210°E

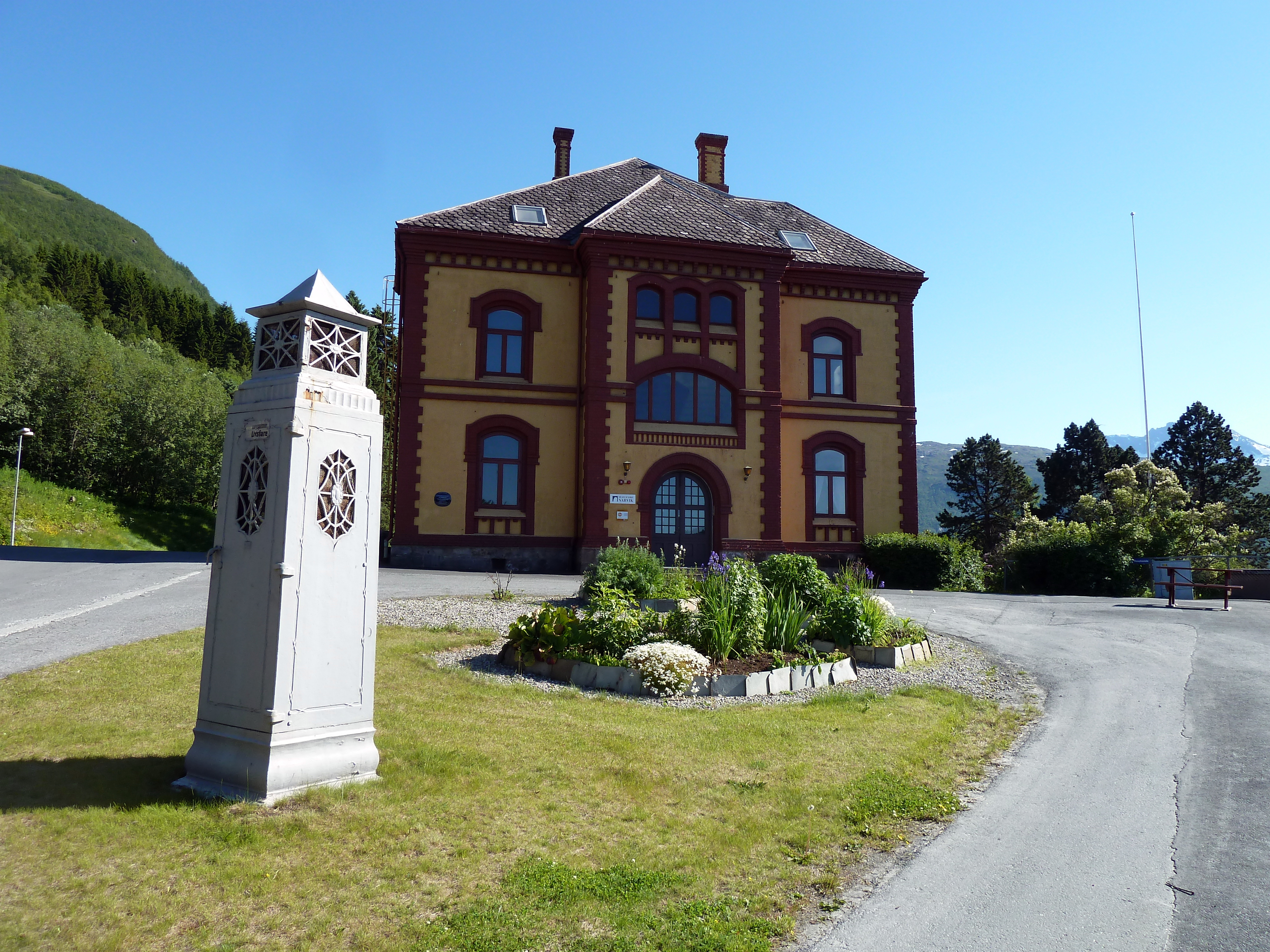
Museum Nord - Narvik

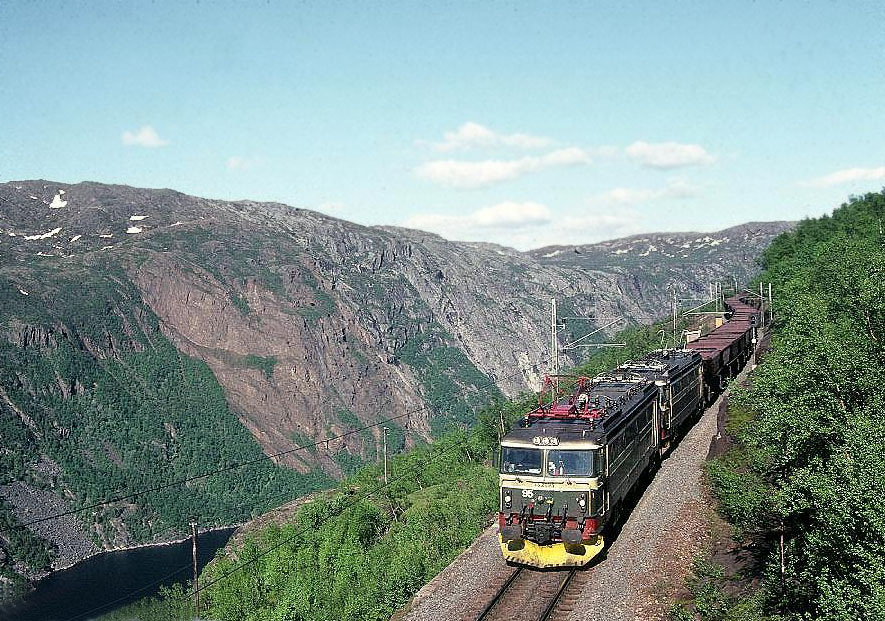
Malmtog freight train transporting ore between Katterat Station and Rombaken

Museum Nord, Narvik (Norwegian: Museum Nord - Narvik) is a museum located in the town of Narvik in Narvik Municipality in Nordland county, Norway. The museum is an anchor point on the European Route of Industrial Heritage.

== History ==
Narvik was founded in 1902 as the railhead of the Ofoten Railway (Ofotbanen) at an ice-free port on the Ofotfjorden to allow the mining corporation LKAB to exports a large supply of iron ore from Kiruna in neighbouring Sweden. LKAB built the Iron Ore Line (Malmbanan) to the Norwegian border. The combined rail line has transported tons of iron ore from Sweden since 1902. Due to the warm currents from the Gulf Stream, the port is usually kept ice-free. The port is also naturally large to hold boats up to 208 metres (682 ft) long and 27 metres (89 ft) deep.

The building that houses Museum Nord, Narvik was erected in 1902, as the head office of the Norwegian state railway company, Norges statsbaner. It was designed by architect, Paul Due. The museum is situated one kilometre from the harbour and contains models of significant bridges and landing stages. The museum also possesses an archive of 200,000 historic photographs. The museum tells the stories of the building of the Ofoten Railway, Swedish mining company LKAB, development of the ice-free harbour of Narvik and the rapid transformation of the town over the past century.
