= Ballangen Museum =

Mining museum in Bjørkåsen, Norway

Coordinates: 68°19′48″N 16°47′49″E

The Ballangen Museum is a unit of Museum Nord, a Norwegian museum consortium. The museum is located at Syllaveien 36 in the village of Bjørkåsen in Narvik Municipality (before 2020 this area was part of Ballangen Municipality, hence the name). The museum is housed in the old administration building of Bjørkåsen Mines (Bjørkaasen Gruber), which was built in 1919. The museum focuses on exhibitions relating to the mining activities that have taken place in Ballangen since the 17th century.

The museum previously had a 600-meter (2,000 ft) deep visitors' mine, which is no longer open to the public. Through pictures, texts, and objects, the museum presents the story of Bjørkåsen Mines from its beginning in 1911 until its closure in 1964. Test operations started at the mine in 1910, and the mining company was licensed for operation in 1913. There are also exhibitions dealing with the daily life of the area, fishing, agriculture, local culture, and education.
